= Glasgow =

Largest city in Scotland

Glasgow: Glaschu (Scottish Gaelic); Glesga (Scots)
- City, lieutenancy and council area
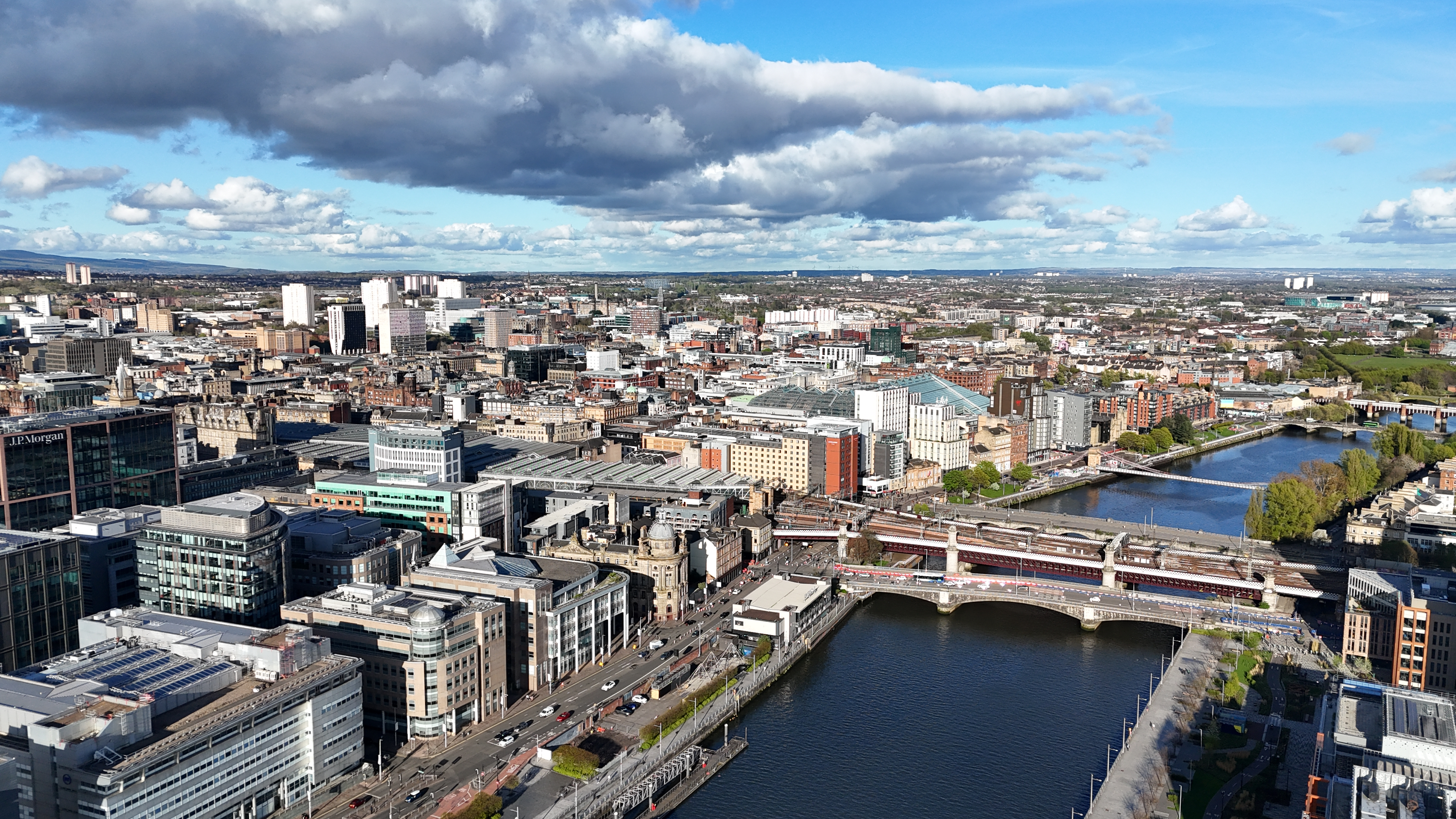
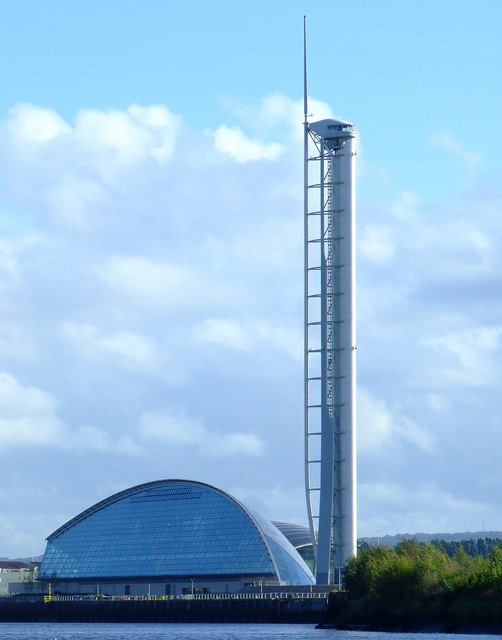
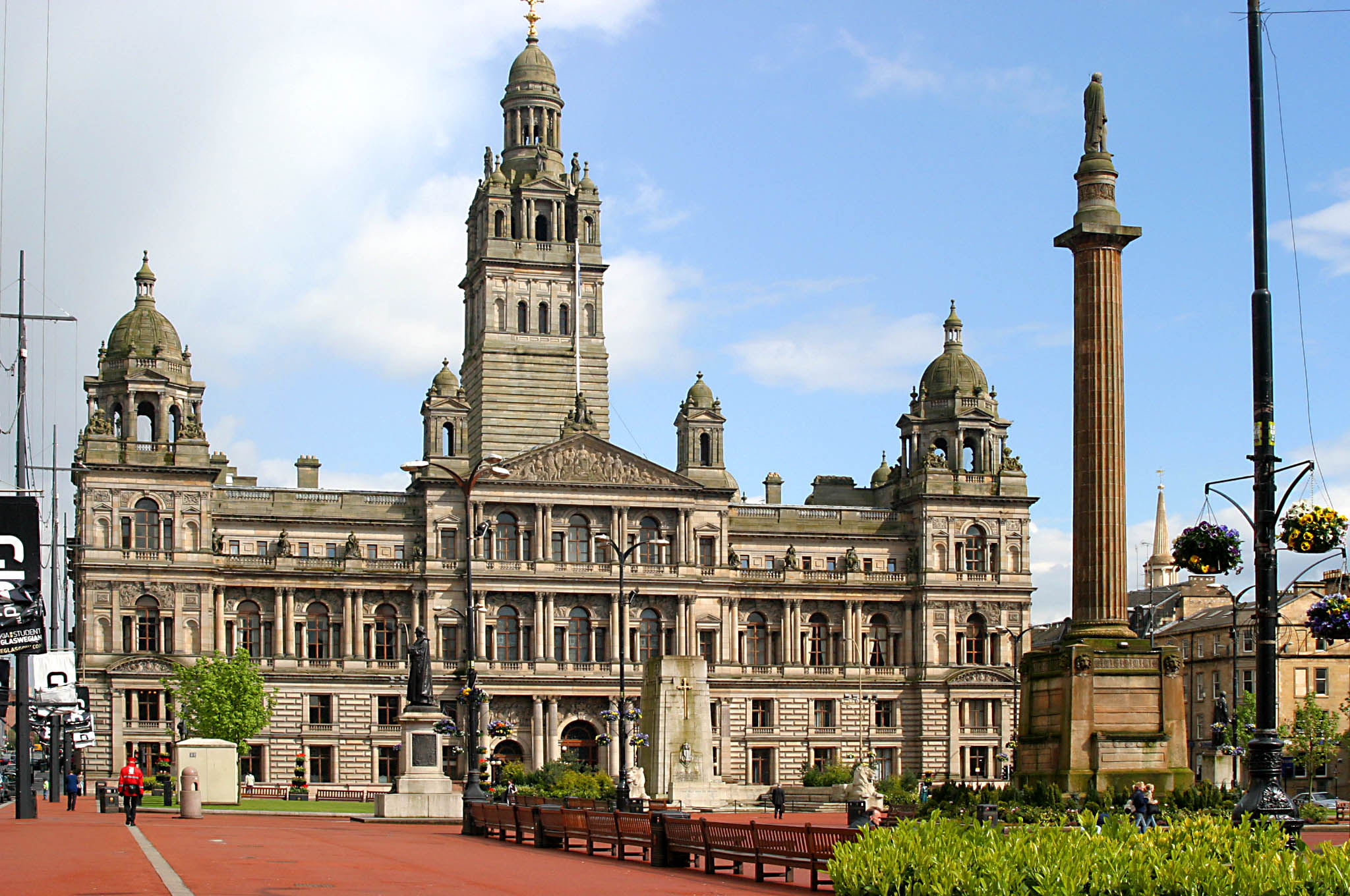
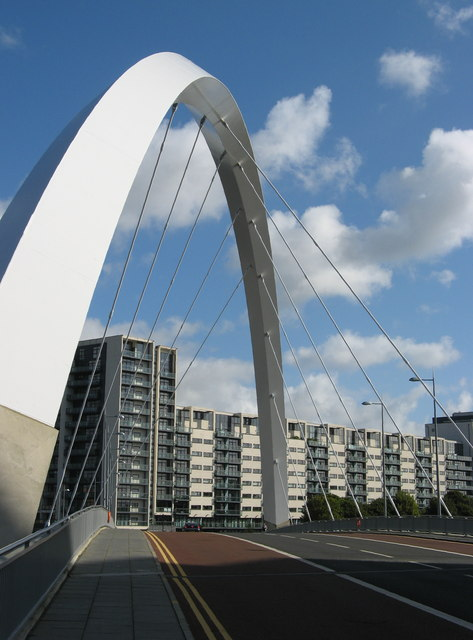
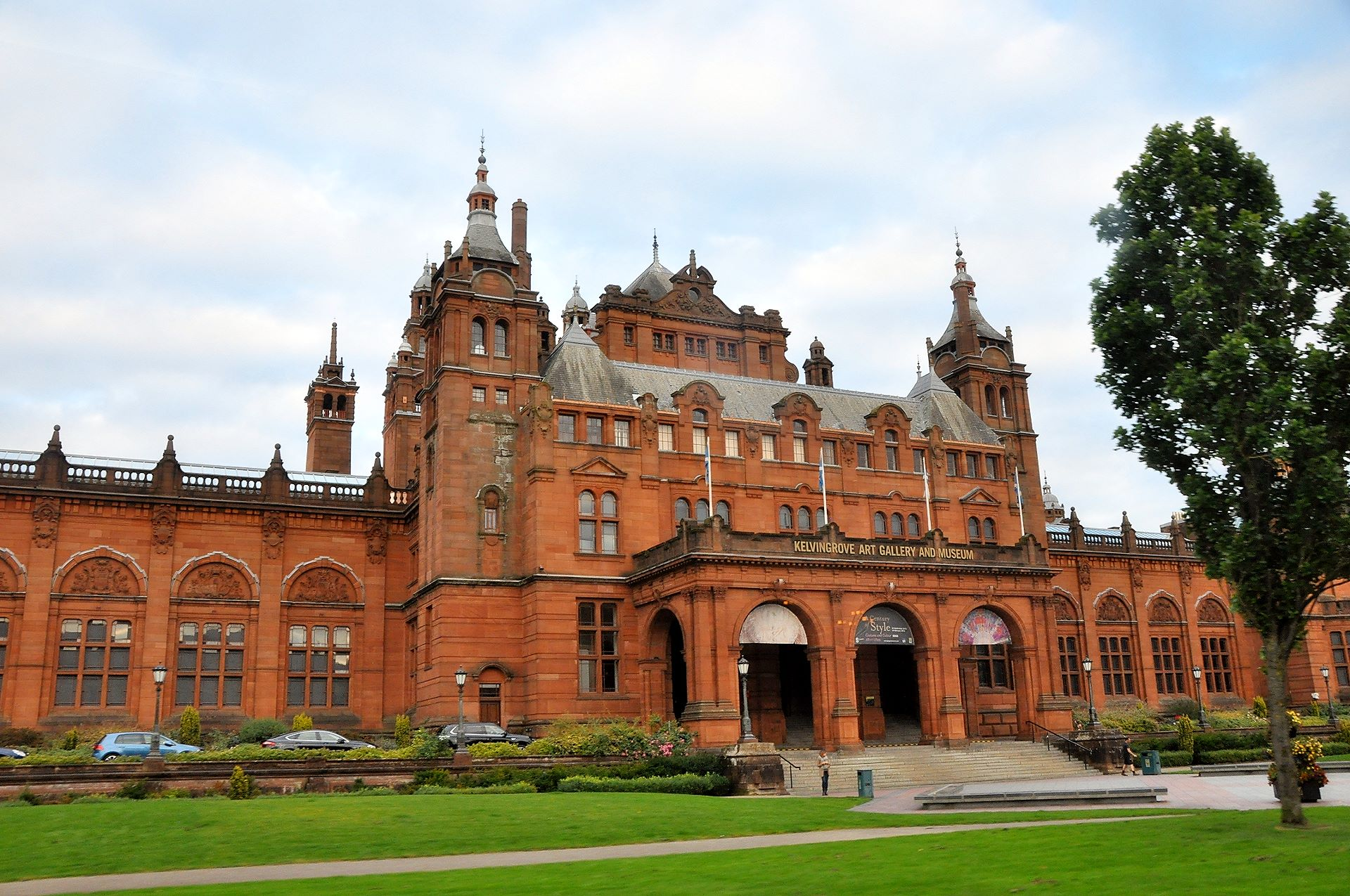
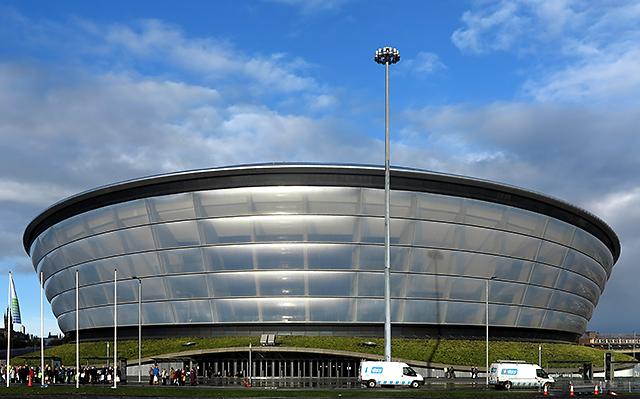
- City Centre Science Centre and Tower George Square River Clyde with the Finnieston Crane and SEC Armadillo Clyde Arc Kelvingrove The Hydro

- Coat of arms Flag of Glasgow City Council
- Nickname: The Dear Green Place, Scottish Gaelic: Baile Mòr nan Gàidheal
- Motto: Let Glasgow Flourish
- Glasgow City shown within Scotland
- Coordinates: 55°51′40″N 04°15′00″W
- Sovereign state: United Kingdom
- Country: Scotland
- Historic County: Lanarkshire
- Lieutenancy area: Glasgow City
- Subdivisions: 23 Wards
- Founded: Late-6th century
- Burgh charter: 1170s
- Unitary authority: 1 April 1996
- Administrative HQ: Glasgow City Chambers

Government
  - Type: Council
  - Body: Glasgow City Council
  - Control: No overall control
  - MPs: 6 MPs: Zubir Ahmed (L); Maureen Burke (L); Patricia Ferguson (L); John Grady (L); Gordon McKee (L); Martin Rhodes (L)
  - MSPs: 15 MSPs: Colm Merrick (SNP); Zen Ghani (SNP); Holly Bruce (G); Bob Doris (SNP); Clare Haughey (SNP); David Linden (SNP); Ivan McKee (SNP); Alison Thewliss (SNP); Patrick Harvie (G); Iris Duane (G); Paul Sweeney (L); Pauline McNeill (L); Monica Lennon (L); Thomas Kerr (R); Kim Schmulian (R)

Area
  - Total: 68 sq mi (175 km^{2})
  - Rank: 26th

Population (2025)
  - Total: 654,330
  - Rank: 1st
  - Density: 9,700/sq mi (3,747/km^{2})
- Demonym: Glaswegian
- Time zone: UTC+0 (GMT)
  - Summer (DST): UTC+1 (BST)
- Postcode areas: G
- Dialling codes: 0141
- ISO 3166 code: GB-GLG
- GSS code: S12000049
- Website: glasgow.gov.uk

Glasgow (Note: /ˈɡlɑːzɡoʊ, ˈɡlæz-/; Scottish Gaelic: Glaschu [ˈkl̪ˠas̪əxu]; Scots: Glesca [ˈɡleskə] or Glesga [ˈɡlezɡə], among other spellings.) is the most populous city in Scotland, located on the banks of the River Clyde in west central Scotland. It is the third-most populous city in the United Kingdom and comprises 23 wards which represent the areas within the city boundaries. Glasgow is a leading city in Scotland for university education and research, finance, industry, commerce, shopping, culture and fashion, and was commonly referred to as the "second city of the British Empire" for much of the Victorian and Edwardian eras.

In 2020, it had an estimated population of 632,350. More than 1,000,000 people live in the Greater Glasgow urban area, while the wider Glasgow City Region is home to more than 1,800,000 people around a third of Scotland's population. The city has a population density of 3,562 people per km^{2}, much higher than the average of 70 people per km^{2} for Scotland as a whole. Glasgow grew from a small rural settlement close to Glasgow Cathedral and descending to the River Clyde to become the largest seaport in Scotland, and the tenth-largest by tonnage in Britain. Expanding from the medieval bishopric and episcopal burgh (subsequently royal burgh), and the later establishment of the University of Glasgow in the 15th century, it became a major centre of the Scottish Enlightenment in the 18th century.

Glasgow became a county in 1893, the city having previously been in the historic county of Lanarkshire, and later growing to also include settlements that were once part of Renfrewshire and Dunbartonshire. It is now one of the 32 unitary council areas of Scotland, and is administered by Glasgow City Council. In the late 19th and early 20th centuries, Glasgow's population grew rapidly, reaching 1,034,174 people in the census of 1921. The population continued to be over 1 million from then until 1965, the peak being 1,127,825 in 1938. Up until 1911 the historic area of the city was 12,975 acres. In the major boundary extensions of 1912, 1926, 1931 and 1936 the city tripled in size to 39,725 acres. The population was greatly reduced following comprehensive urban renewal projects in the 1960s and 1970s which resulted in large-scale relocation of people to designated new towns, such as Cumbernauld, Livingston, East Kilbride and peripheral suburbs.

Glasgow's major cultural institutions enjoy international reputations. They include the Hunterian Museum and Art Gallery, Burrell Collection, Kelvingrove Art Gallery and Museum, Royal Scottish National Orchestra, BBC Scottish Symphony Orchestra, Scottish Ballet, Royal Conservatoire of Scotland, Scottish Opera, National Piping Centre and Citizens Theatre. Glasgow became the European Capital of Culture in 1990 and is notable for its architecture, culture, media, music scene, sports clubs and transport connections. It is the fifth-most-visited city in the United Kingdom. Glasgow is also well known in the sporting world for association football, particularly for the Old Firm rivalry between Celtic and Rangers. The Partick area of the city is culturally significant as the location of the first international football match in 1872. Glasgow hosted the Commonwealth Games in 2014 and 2026.

== Etymology and heraldry ==
The name Glasgow is Brittonic in origin. The first element glas, meaning "grey-green, grey-blue" both in Brittonic, Scottish Gaelic and modern day Welsh and the second *cöü, "hollow" (cf. Welsh glas-cau), giving a meaning of "green-hollow". It is often said that the name means "dear green place" or that "dear green place" is a translation from Gaelic Glas Caomh. "The dear green place" remains an affectionate way of referring to the city. The modern Gaelic is Glaschu and derived from the same roots as the Brittonic.

The settlement may have an earlier Brittonic name, Cathures. The modern name appears for the first time in 1116, in the Gaelic period, as Glasgu. It is also recorded that the king of Strathclyde, Rhydderch Hael, welcomed Saint Kentigern (also known as Saint Mungo), and procured his consecration as bishop about 540 CE. For some thirteen years Kentigern laboured in the region, building his church at the Molendinar Burn where Glasgow Cathedral now stands, and making many converts. A large community developed around him and became known as Glasgu. In October 1866, the coat of arms of the City of Glasgow was granted to the royal burgh by the Lord Lyon. It incorporates a number of symbols and emblems associated with the life of Glasgow's patron saint, Mungo, which had been used on official seals prior to that date. The emblems represent miracles supposed to have been performed by Mungo and are listed in the traditional rhyme:

Here's the bird that never flew
Here's the tree that never grew
Here's the bell that never rang
Here's the fish that never swam

St Mungo is also said to have preached a sermon containing the words Lord, Let Glasgow flourish by the preaching of the word and the praising of thy name. This was abbreviated to "Let Glasgow Flourish" and adopted as the city's motto. In 1450, John Stewart, the first Lord Provost of Glasgow, left an endowment so that a "St Mungo's Bell" could be made and tolled throughout the city so that the citizens would pray for his soul. A new bell was purchased by the magistrates in 1641 and that bell is still on display in the People's Palace Museum, near Glasgow Green. The supporters are two salmon bearing rings, and the crest is a half-length figure of Saint Mungo. He wears a bishop's mitre and liturgical vestments and has his hand raised in "the act of benediction". The original 1866 grant placed the crest atop a helm, but this was removed in subsequent grants. The current 1996 version has a gold mural crown between the shield and the crest. This form of coronet, resembling an embattled city wall, was allowed to the four area councils with city status.

The arms were re-matriculated by the City of Glasgow District Council in February 1975, and by the present area council in March 1996. The only change made on each occasion was in the type of coronet over the arms.

== History ==
=== Early history ===
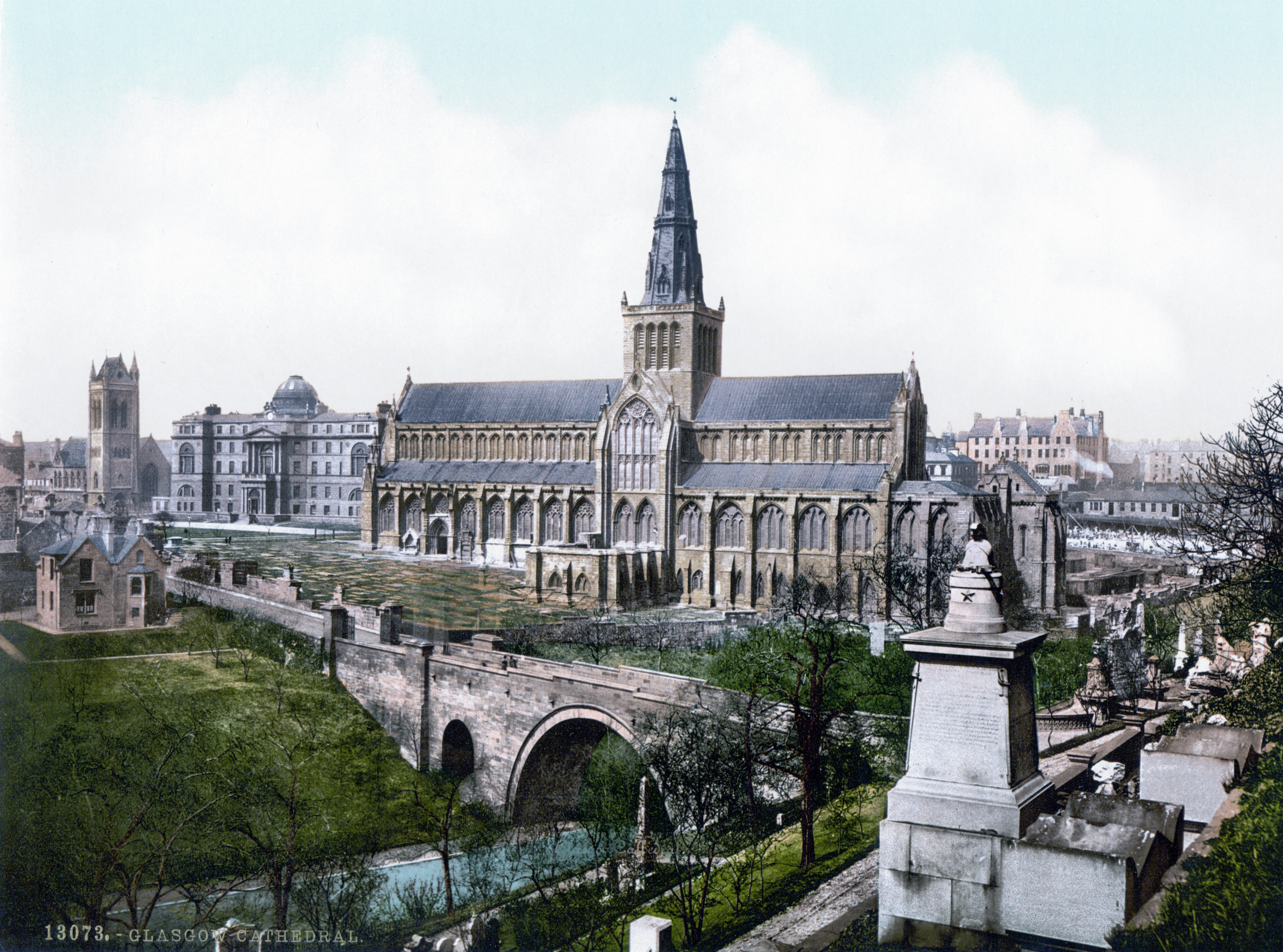
The Cathedral of St Mungo's. Saint Mungo is reputed to have founded the city in the 6th century

The area around Glasgow has hosted communities for millennia, with the River Clyde providing a natural location for fishing. The Romans later built outposts in the area and, to protect Roman Britannia from the Brittonic speaking (Celtic) Caledonians, constructed the Antonine Wall. Items from the wall, such as altars from Roman forts of Balmuildy, are now located at the Hunterian Museum.

Glasgow itself was reputed to have been founded by the Christian missionary Saint Mungo in the 6th century. He established a church on the Molendinar Burn, where the present Glasgow Cathedral stands, and in the following years Glasgow became a religious centre. Glasgow grew over the following centuries as part of the Kingdom of Strathclyde and the Kingdom of Scotland. The Glasgow Fair began in 1190. A bridge over the River Clyde was recorded from around 1285, where Victoria Bridge now stands. As the lowest bridging point on the Clyde it was an important crossing. The area around the bridge became known as Briggait.

The founding of the University of Glasgow adjoining the cathedral in 1451 and elevation of the bishopric to become the Archdiocese of Glasgow in 1492 increased the town's religious and educational status and landed wealth. By the fifteenth century the urban area stretched from the area around the cathedral and university in the north down to the bridge and the banks of the Clyde in the south along High Street, Saltmarket and Bridgegate, crossing an east–west route at Glasgow Cross which became the commercial centre of the city.

=== Scottish Reformation ===
Following the European Protestant Reformation and with the encouragement of the Convention of Royal Burghs, the 14 incorporated trade crafts federated as the Glasgow Trades House in 1605 to match the power and influence in the town council of the earlier Merchants' Guilds, who established their Merchants House in the same year. In 1611, Glasgow was raised to the status of Royal Burgh. Daniel Defoe visited the city in the early 18th century and famously opined in his book A tour thro' the whole island of Great Britain, that Glasgow was "the cleanest and beautifullest, and best built city in Britain, London excepted". At that time the city's population was about 12,000, and the city was yet to undergo the massive expansionary changes to its economy and urban fabric, brought about by the Scottish Enlightenment and Industrial Revolution.

=== Economic growth ===
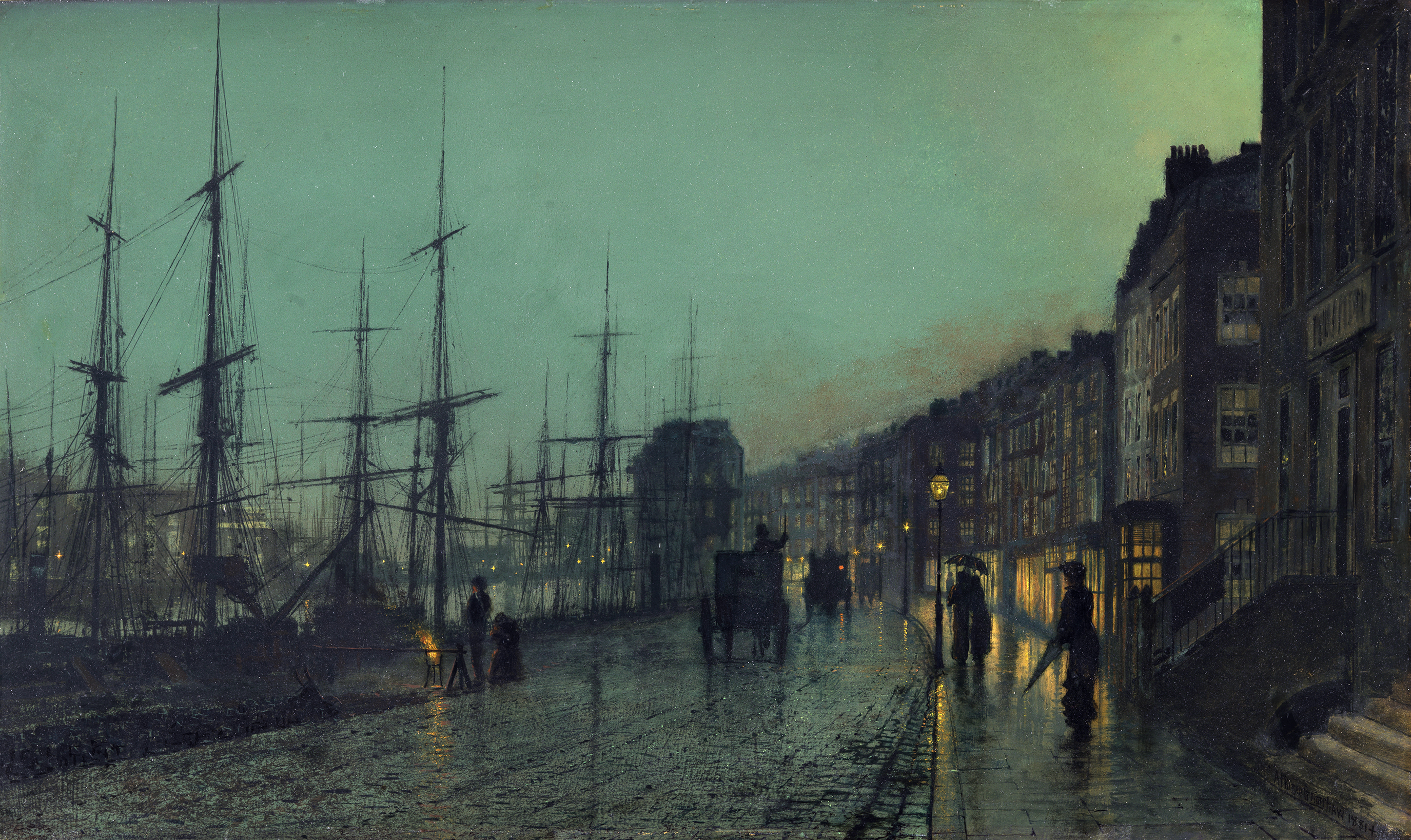
Shipping on the Clyde, Atkinson Grimshaw, 1881. Shipbuilding became a symbol of Glasgow's economic importance

Its early trade was in agriculture, brewing and fishing, with cured salmon and herring being exported to Europe and the Mediterranean. Trade greatly expanded and, starting in 1668, the city's magistrates created a new town and deep water port at Port Glasgow about 20 mi (32 km) down the River Clyde, as the river from the city to that point was then too shallow for seagoing merchant ships. After the Acts of Union in 1707, Scotland gained further access to the vast markets of the new British Empire, and Glasgow became prominent as a hub of international trade to and from the Americas, especially in sugar, tobacco, cotton, and manufactured goods, to be followed by trade with India and Asia. The city prospered from its involvement in the triangular trade and the Atlantic slave trade that the former depended upon. Glasgow merchants dealt in slave-produced cash crops such as sugar, tobacco, and cotton. From 1717 to 1766, Scottish slave ships mainly operating out of Glasgow's early satellite ports of Greenock and Port Glasgow transported approximately 3,000 enslaved Africans from Africa to the Americas (out of a total number of 5,000 slaves carried by ships from Scotland). By the late 18th century more than half of the British tobacco trade was concentrated on the River Clyde, with more than 47,000,000 lb (21,000 t) of tobacco being imported each year at its peak, to be re-exported to England and Europe, most notably France.

From the second half of the 1700s, and onwards, textile manufacturing and exporting dominated trade in Glasgow and its surrounding counties on a par with Manchester. Local coalfields provided the energy to support mechanisation and expansion. Glasgow's connected chemical industry achieved world-status. In 1801 the discovery of ironstone within the vast coalfields to the east of the city started iron manufacturing and exporting, helped by the invention in 1828 of hot-blast furnaces, to be followed by the creation of steel-making. The new sciences and inventions, much coming from its universities and technical colleges, opened all branches of engineering. Glasgow and the Clyde became the undisputed world centre of shipbuilding. Its port increased to 12 miles of quays and docks and 500 miles of railway. Dozens of new shipping companies were formed, including Cunard, Allan, British India, Union-Castle, City Line, Clan Line and others. Glasgow became the largest centre of locomotive building in Europe. Commerce and banking flourished.

From the mid-eighteenth century the city began expanding westwards from its medieval core at Glasgow Cross, with a grid-iron street plan starting from the 1770s and eventually reaching George Square to accommodate much of the growth (with that expansion much later becoming known in the 1980s onwards as the Merchant City. The largest growth in the city centre area, building on the wealth of trading internationally, was the next expansion being the grid-iron streets west of Buchanan Street riding up and over Blythswood Hill from 1800 onwards.

The opening of the Monkland Canal and basin linking to the Forth and Clyde Canal at Port Dundas in 1795, also facilitated access to the extensive iron-ore and coal mines in Lanarkshire. After extensive river engineering projects to dredge and deepen the River Clyde as far as Glasgow, shipbuilding became a major industry on the upper stretches of the river, pioneered by industrialists such as Robert Napier, John Elder, George Thomson, Sir William Pearce and Sir Alfred Yarrow. The River Clyde also became an important source of inspiration for artists, such as John Atkinson Grimshaw, John Knox, James Kay, Sir Muirhead Bone, Robert Eadie and L.S. Lowry, willing to depict the new industrial era and the modern world, as did Stanley Spencer downriver at Port Glasgow.

=== Population growth ===
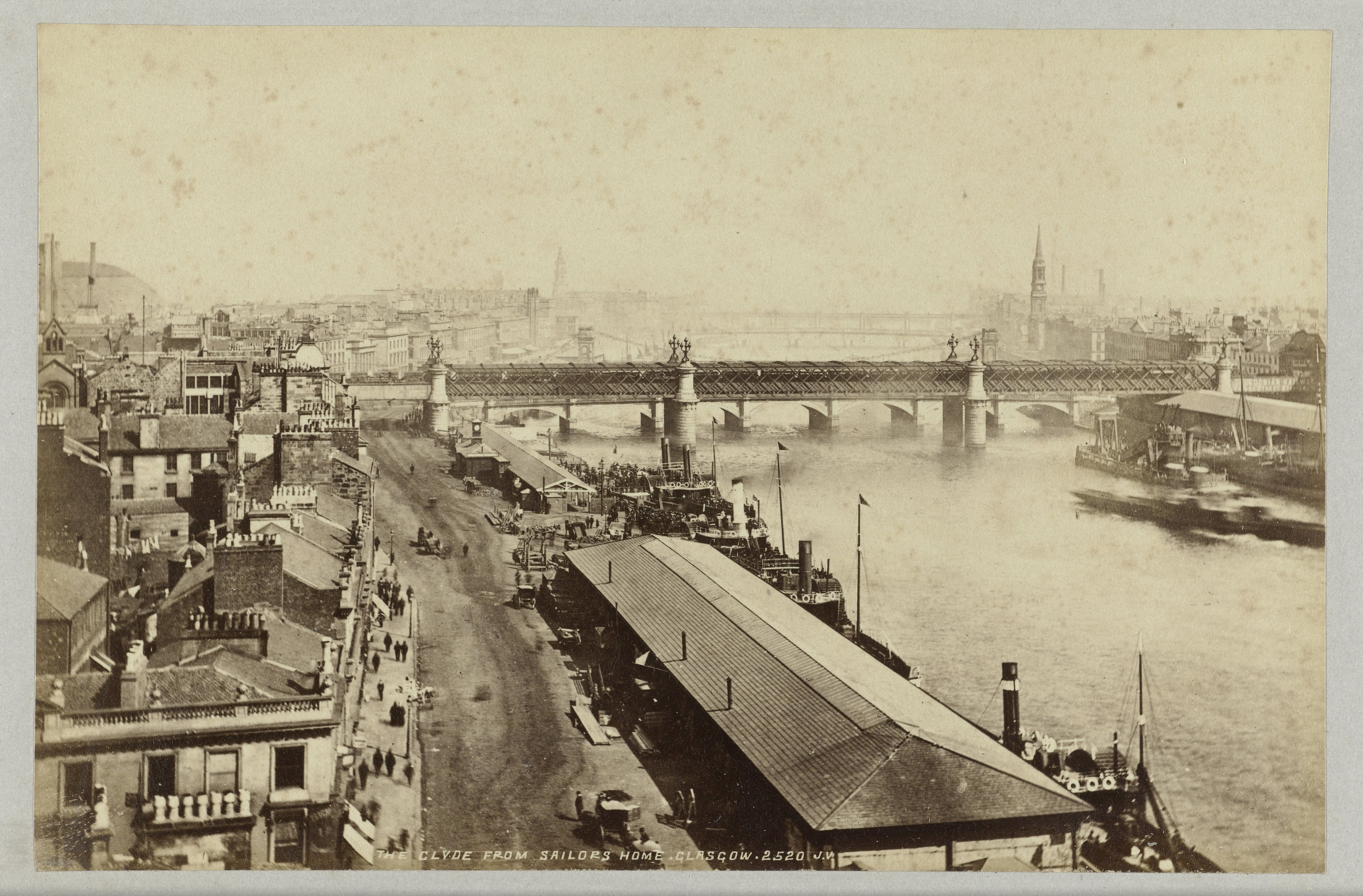
Glasgow in 1864 during the height of its population surge

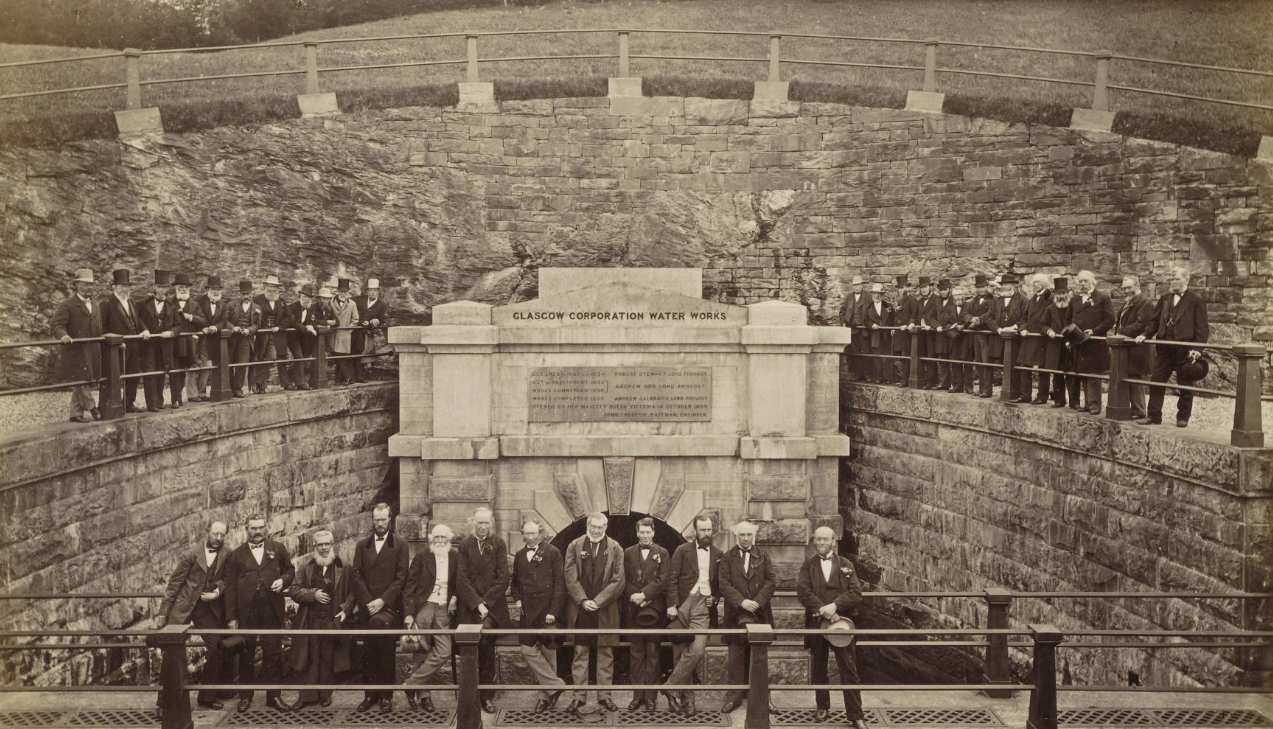
Members of the water committee of the Glasgow Corporation Waterworks, 1876

With the population growing, the first scheme to provide a public water supply was by the Glasgow Company in 1806. A second company was formed in 1812, and the two merged in 1838, but there was some dissatisfaction with the quality of the water supplied. The Gorbals Gravitation Water Company began supplying water to residents living to the south of the River Clyde in 1846, obtained from reservoirs, which gave 75,000 people a constant water supply, but others were not so fortunate, and some 4,000 died in an outbreak of cholera in 1848/1849. This led to the development of the Glasgow Corporation Waterworks, with a project to raise the level of Loch Katrine and to convey clean water by gravity along a 26-mile (42-kilometre) aqueduct to a holding reservoir at Milngavie, and then by pipes into the city. The project cost £980,000 and was opened by Queen Victoria in 1859. In the early 19th century an eighth of the people lived in single-room accommodation.

The engineer for the project was John Frederick Bateman, while James Morris Gale became the resident engineer for the city section of the project, and subsequently became engineer in chief for Glasgow Water Commissioners. He oversaw several improvements during his tenure, including a second aqueduct and further raising of water levels in Loch Katrine. Additional supplies were provided by Loch Arklet in 1902, by impounding the water and creating a tunnel to allow water to flow into Loch Katrine. A similar scheme to create a reservoir in Glen Finglas was authorised in 1903, but was deferred, and was not completed until 1965. Following the 2002 Glasgow floods, the waterborne parasite cryptosporidium was found in the reservoir at Milngavie, and so the new Milngavie water treatment works was built. It was opened by Queen Elizabeth in 2007, and won the 2007 Utility Industry Achievement Award, having been completed ahead of its time schedule and for £10 million below its budgeted cost.

Good health requires both clean water and effective removal of sewage. The Caledonian Railway rebuilt many of the sewers, as part of a deal to allow them to tunnel under the city, and sewage treatment works were opened at Dalmarnoch in 1894, Dalmuir in 1904 and Shieldhall in 1910. The works experimented to find better ways to treat sewage, and a number of experimental filters were constructed, until a full activated sludge plant was built between 1962 and 1968 at a cost of £4 million.

Treated sludge was dumped at sea, and Glasgow Corporation owned six sludge ships between 1904 and 1998, when the EU Urban Waste Water Treatment Directive ended the practice. The sewerage infrastructure was improved significantly in 2017, with the completion of a tunnel three miles (five kilometres) long, which provides 20 million imperial gallons (90 megalitres) of storm water storage. It will reduce the risk of flooding and the likelihood that sewage will overflow into the Clyde during storms. Since 2002, clean water provision and sewerage have been the responsibility of Scottish Water.

Glasgow's population had surpassed that of Edinburgh by 1821. The development of civic institutions included the City of Glasgow Police in 1800, one of the first municipal police forces in the world. Despite the crisis caused by the City of Glasgow Bank's collapse in 1878, growth continued and by the end of the 19th century it was one of the cities known as the "Second City of the Empire" and was producing more than half Britain's tonnage of shipping and a quarter of all locomotives in the world. In addition to its pre-eminence in shipbuilding, engineering, industrial machinery, bridge building, chemicals, explosives, coal and oil industries it developed as a major centre in textiles, garment-making, carpet manufacturing, leather processing, furniture-making, pottery, food and drink, cigarette making, printing and publishing. Shipping, banking, insurance and professional services expanded at the same time.

Glasgow became one of the first cities in Europe to reach a population of one million. The city's new trades and sciences attracted new residents from across the Lowlands and the Highlands of Scotland, from Ireland and other parts of Britain and from Continental Europe. During this period, the construction of many of the city's greatest architectural masterpieces and most ambitious civil engineering projects, such as the Milngavie water treatment works, Glasgow Subway, Glasgow Corporation Tramways, City Chambers, Mitchell Library and Kelvingrove Art Gallery and Museum were being funded by its wealth. The city also held a series of International Exhibitions at Kelvingrove Park, in 1888, 1901 and 1911, with Britain's last major International Exhibition, the Empire Exhibition, being subsequently held in 1938 at Bellahouston Park, which drew 13 million visitors.

=== War years and regeneration ===
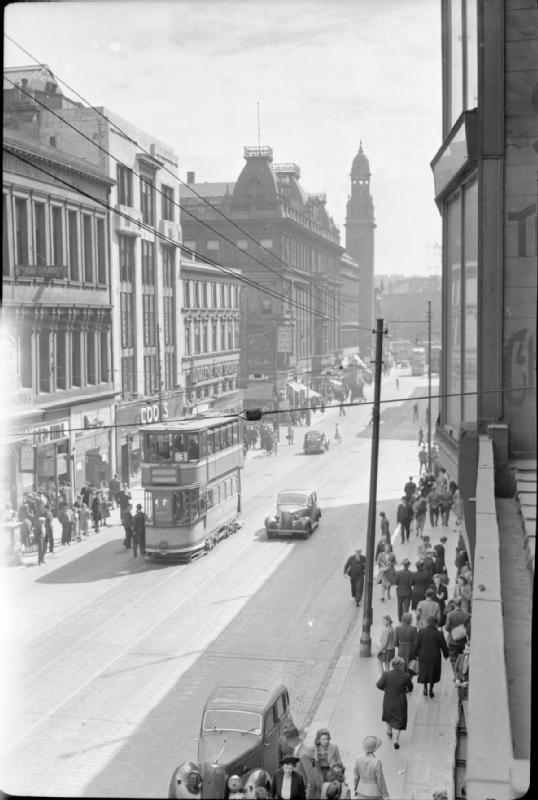
Sauchiehall Street in 1943 during World War II

During the First World War, Glasgow raised 28 new battalions of men. By the end of the conflict, approximately 18,000 Glaswegian soldiers had been lost. As so many men left their jobs to join up, women were employed in shipyards, munitions factories and other industries and contributed a vital service to the war effort. In 1917, this was acknowledged publicly when King George V presented an OBE to a munitions worker, Lizzie Robertson, who was cheered by many other female munitions workers, during a ceremony held in Ibrox Stadium. Women from the city also served with the Scottish Women's Hospitals for Foreign Service; for example, Louisa Jordan, a nurse from Maryhill who was posted to Serbia, and Norah Neilson Gray from Hillhead who served as an orderly in Royaumont. Victoria Crosses were awarded to several Glaswegian men during World War One: Private Henry May, Sergeant Robert Downie, Sergeant John Meikle, drummer Walter Potter Ritchie, Company Serjeant Major John Kendrick Skinner, Doctor Harry Ranken, Sergeant James Youill Turnbull and Lieutenant Donald MacKintosh.

The 20th century witnessed both decline and renewal in the city. After World War I, the city suffered from the impact of the Post–World War I recession and from the later Great Depression, this also led to a rise of radical socialism and the "Red Clydeside" movement. The city had recovered by the outbreak of World War II. The city saw aerial bombardment by the Luftwaffe during the Clydebank Blitz, during the war, then grew through the post-war boom that lasted through the 1950s. By the 1960s, growth of industry in countries like Japan and West Germany, weakened the once pre-eminent position of many of the city's industries. As a result of this, Glasgow entered a lengthy period of relative economic decline and rapid de-industrialisation, leading to high unemployment, urban decay, population decline, welfare dependency and poor health for the city's inhabitants. There were active attempts at regeneration of the city, when the Glasgow Corporation published its controversial Bruce Report, which set out a comprehensive series of initiatives aimed at turning round the decline of the city. The report led to a huge and radical programme of rebuilding and regeneration efforts that started in the mid-1950s and lasted into the late 1970s. Central to this was the creation of 29 "Comprehensive Development Areas" (CDAs) – which saw total destruction of overcrowded and insanitary tenement housing and the general reduction of population density. The displaced communities were either rehoused in new suburban housing estates or in the new towns or in lower density housing "schemes" built within the CDAs themselves which consisted largely of tower blocks.

The city invested heavily in roads infrastructure, with an extensive system of arterial roads and motorways that bisected the central area. There are also accusations that the Scottish Office had deliberately attempted to undermine Glasgow's economic and politically Mackintoshian influence in post-war Scotland by diverting inward investment in new industries to other regions during the Silicon Glen boom and creating the new towns of Cumbernauld, Glenrothes, Irvine, Livingston and East Kilbride, dispersed across the Scottish Lowlands, to halve the city's population base. By the late 1980s, there had been a significant resurgence in Glasgow's economic fortunes. The "Glasgow's miles better" campaign, launched in 1983, and opening of the Burrell Collection in 1983 and Scottish Exhibition and Conference Centre in 1985 facilitated Glasgow's new role as a European centre for business services and finance and promoted an increase in tourism and inward investment. The latter continues to be bolstered by the legacy of the city's Glasgow Garden Festival in 1988, its status as European Capital of Culture in 1990, and concerted attempts to diversify the city's economy. However, it is the industrial heritage that serves as key tourism enabler. Wider economic revival has persisted and the ongoing regeneration of inner-city areas, including the large-scale Clyde Waterfront Regeneration, has led to more affluent people moving back to live in the centre of Glasgow, fuelling allegations of gentrification. In 2008, the city was listed by Lonely Planet as one of the world's top 10 tourist cities.

=== Recent and contemporary history ===
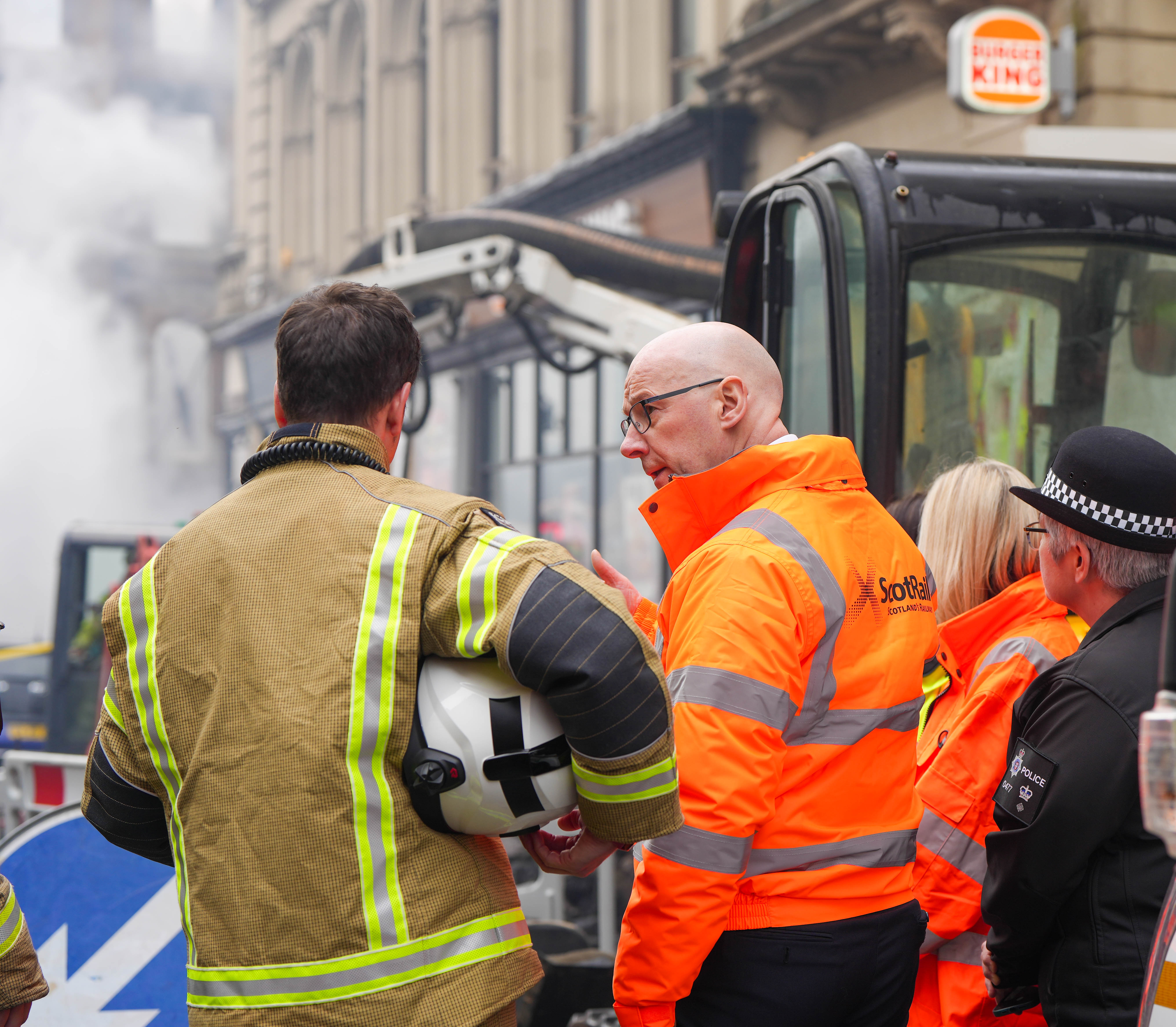
First Minister of Scotland, John Swinney, attends the scene of the Union Street fire, 9 March 2026

In 2007, the city's primary airport was the target of a terrorist attack when a Jeep Cherokee filled with propane gas cylinders and petrol cans was driven at considerable speed into the entrance of the main terminal building. This was the first time that a terrorist attack had targeted Scotland specifically, and was the second terrorist attack to occur in Scotland following the explosion of Pan Am Flight 103 over the town of Lockerbie in the Scottish Borders in December 1988.

In 2008 the city was ranked at 43 for Personal Safety in the Mercer index of top 50 safest cities in the world. The Mercer report was specifically looking at Quality of Living, yet by 2011 within Glasgow, certain areas were (still) "failing to meet the Scottish Air Quality Objective levels for nitrogen dioxide (NO2) and particulate matter (PM10)".

The city hosted the 2021 United Nations Climate Change Conference (COP26) at its main events venue, the SEC Centre. Glasgow hosted the 2014 and 2026 Commonwealth Games. Glasgow also hosted the first European Championships in 2018, was one of the host cities for UEFA Euro 2020, and will be a host city of the UEFA Euro 2028. The UK's first official consumption room, the Thistle, for illegal drugs including heroin and cocaine was set to open on 21 October 2024, however this was delayed, eventually opening on 13 January 2025.

Since October 2023, the city has witnessed a number of pro-Palestinian demonstrations in response to the Israel–Hamas war. Thousands of people took part in marches in the city centre in October 2023 as part of wider rallies held across Scotland. Further protests and sit-ins were held at locations including George Square, Queen Street railway station and Glasgow Central station during late 2023. Protesters gathered on the Buchanan Street steps before marching to the BBC Scotland headquarters at Pacific Quay. Bath Street was closed due to the large number of people attending the demonstration. In January 2026, protesters staged a sit-in inside the same BBC Scotland building. Approximately ten protesters gained access to the reception area of the BBC Scotland headquarters at Pacific Quay, chanting and shouting, before Police Scotland intervened to manage the incident.

On 8 March 2026, the Union Street fire occurred, destroying the historic Union Corner building and causing severe disruption to Central Station, with trains cancelled for at least a week.

== Government and politics ==
=== Government ===
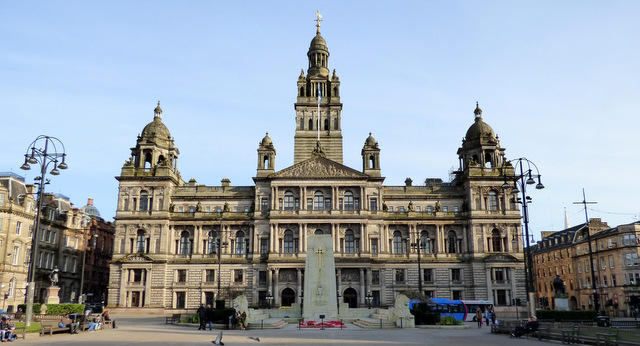
Glasgow City Chambers, located on George Square, is the headquarters of Glasgow City Council and the seat of local government in the city, circa 1900.

Glasgow Corporation had been a pioneer in the municipal socialist movement from the late-nineteenth century. Since the Representation of the People Act 1918, Glasgow increasingly supported left-wing ideas and politics at a national level. The city council was controlled by the Labour Party for more than thirty years, since the decline of the Progressives.

Since 2007, when local government elections in Scotland began to use the single transferable vote rather than the first-past-the-post system, the dominance of the Labour Party within the city started to decline. As a result of the 2017 United Kingdom local elections, the SNP was able to form a minority administration ending Labour's thirty-seven years of uninterrupted control.

In the aftermath of the Russian Revolution of 1917 and the German Revolution of 1918–19, the city's frequent strikes and militant organisations caused serious alarm at Westminster. A huge demonstration in the city's George Square on 31 January 1919 ended in violence, known as the Battle of George Square, and the Riot Act was read. The Sheriff of Lanarkshire called for military aid and 10,000 troops were deployed.

Industrial action at the shipyards gave rise to the "Red Clydeside" epithet. During the 1930s, Glasgow was the main base of the Independent Labour Party. Towards the end of the twentieth century, it became a centre of the struggle against the poll tax; which was introduced in Scotland a whole year before the rest of the United Kingdom and also served as the main base of the Scottish Socialist Party, another left-wing political party in Scotland. The city has not had a Conservative MP since the 1982 Hillhead by-election, when the SDP took the seat, which was in Glasgow's most affluent area. The fortunes of the Conservative Party continued to decline into the twenty-first century, winning only one of the 79 councillors on Glasgow City Council in 2012, despite having been the controlling party (as the Progressives) from 1969 to 1972 when Sir Donald Liddle was the last non-Labour Lord Provost.

=== Elections and representation ===
Glasgow is represented in both the House of Commons in London, and the Scottish Parliament in Holyrood, Edinburgh. At Westminster, it is represented by seven Members of Parliament (MPs), all elected at least once every five years to represent individual constituencies, using the first-past-the-post system of voting. In Holyrood, Glasgow is represented by sixteen Members of the Scottish Parliament (MSPs). Nine are elected to represent individual constituencies once every five years using first-past-the-post. Seven are elected as additional regional members, by proportional representation.

Since the 2021 Scottish Parliament election, Glasgow is represented at Holyrood by 9 Scottish National Party MSPs, 4 Labour MSPs, 2 Conservative MSPs and 1 Scottish Green MSP. In the European Parliament, the city formed part of the Scotland constituency, which elected six Members of the European Parliament (MEPs) prior to Brexit.

Since Glasgow is covered and operates under two separate central governments, the Scottish Government and the UK Government, they determine various matters that Glasgow City Council is not responsible for. The Glasgow electoral region of the Scottish Parliament covers the Glasgow City council area, a north-western part of South Lanarkshire and a small eastern portion of Renfrewshire. It elects nine of the parliament's 73 first past the post constituency members and seven of the 56 additional members. Both kinds of member are known as Members of the Scottish Parliament (MSPs). The system of election is designed to produce a form of proportional representation.

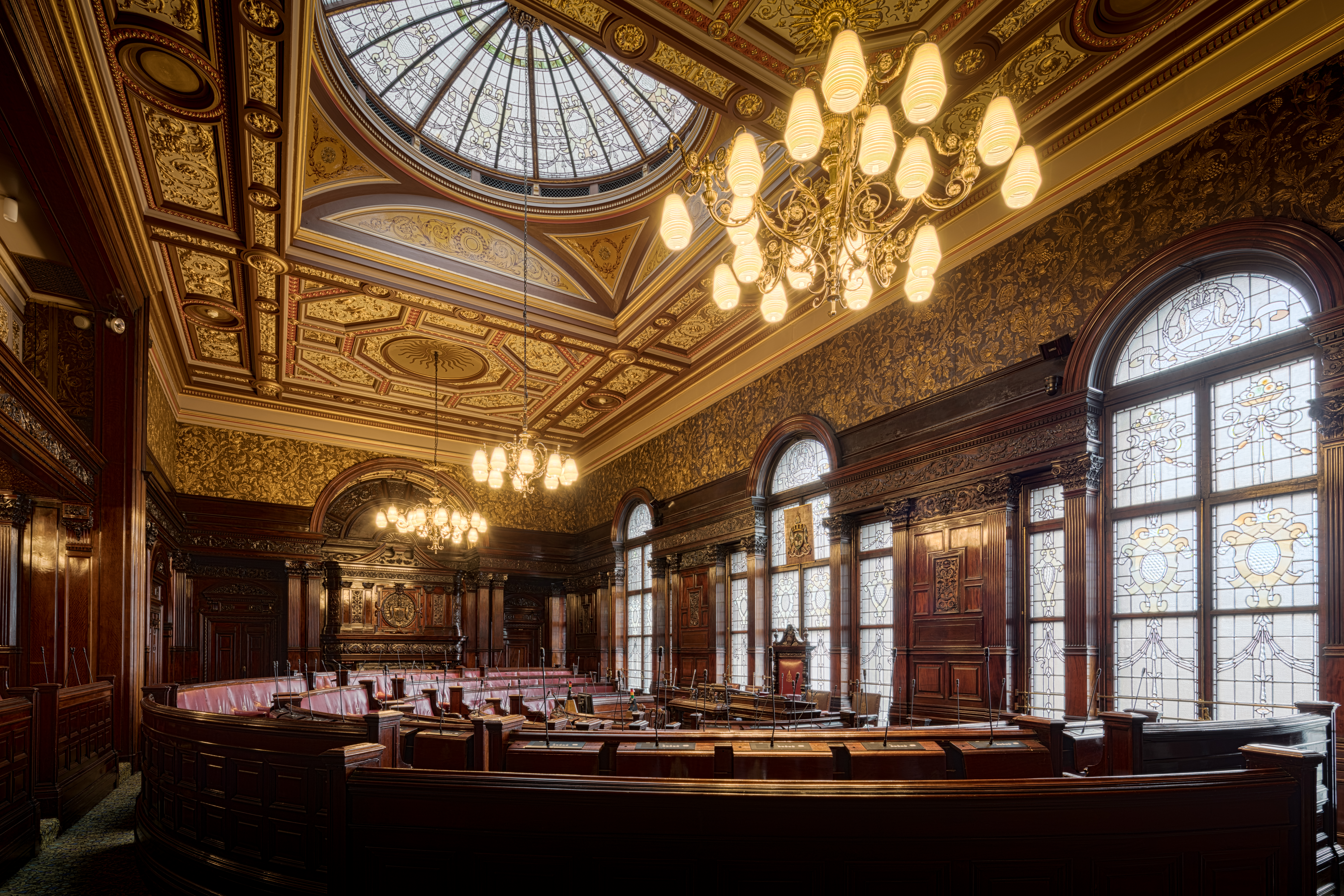
The debating chamber within the City Chambers

The first past the post seats were created in 1999 with the names and boundaries of then existing Westminster (House of Commons) constituencies. In 2005, the number of Westminster Members of Parliament (MPs) representing Scotland was cut to 59, with new constituencies being formed, while the existing number of MSPs was retained at Holyrood. In the 2011 Scottish Parliament election, the boundaries of the Glasgow region were redrawn. In the Scottish independence referendum, Glasgow voted "Yes" by a margin of 53.5% to 46.5%.

In the Brexit referendum, results varied from constituency to constituency. Glasgow North recorded the biggest remain vote with 78% opting to stay in the EU whilst in Glasgow East this figure dropped to 56%. The city as a whole voted to remain in the EU, by 66.6% to 33.3%. Following the 2014 Scottish independence referendum, in which 53.49% of the electorate of Glasgow voted in favour of Scottish independence; the SNP won every seat in the city at the 2015 general election, including a record-breaking 39.3% swing from Labour to SNP in the Glasgow North East constituency.

At the 2017 snap general election, Glasgow was represented by 6 Scottish National Party MPs and 1 Labour MP; the Glasgow North East constituency which had a record 39.3% swing from Labour to SNP at the previous general election, was regained by Paul Sweeney of the Scottish Labour Party, who narrowly defeated sitting SNP MP Anne McLaughlin by 242 votes.

== Geography and climate ==
Glasgow

Climate chart (precipitation, max. and min. temperature)
J	F	M	A	M	J	J	A	S	O	N	D
146 7 2	115 8 2	97 10 3	66 13 5	69 16 7	68 18 10	83 20 12	95 19 12	98 17 10	132 13 7	132 10 4	161 7 2
- █ Average max. and min. temperatures in °C
- █ Precipitation totals in mm
- Source: MetOffice
Imperial conversion
J	F	M	A	M	J	J	A	S	O	N	D
5.7 45 36	4.5 46 36	3.8 50 38	2.6 55 41	2.7 61 45	2.7 65 51	3.3 68 54	3.7 67 53	3.9 62 50	5.2 55 44	5.2 49 40	6.3 45 36
- █ Average max. and min. temperatures in °F
- █ Precipitation totals in inches

Glasgow is located on the banks of the River Clyde, in West Central Scotland. Another important river is the Kelvin, a tributary of the River Clyde, whose name was used in creating the title of Baron Kelvin the renowned physicist for whom the SI unit of temperature, Kelvin, is named. The burgh of Glasgow was historically in Lanarkshire, but close to the border with Renfrewshire. When elected county councils were established in 1890, Glasgow was deemed capable of running its own affairs and so was excluded from the administrative area of Lanarkshire County Council, whilst remaining part of Lanarkshire for lieutenancy and judicial purposes.

The burgh was substantially enlarged in 1891 to take in areas from both Lanarkshire and Renfrewshire where the urban area had grown beyond the old burgh boundary. In 1893, the burgh became its own county for lieutenancy and judicial purposes too, being made a county of itself. From 1975 to 1996 the city was part of Strathclyde Region, with the city's council becoming a lower-tier district council. Strathclyde was abolished in 1996, since when the city has again been responsible for all aspects of local government, being one of the 32 council areas in Scotland.

Like much of lowland Britain, Glasgow's climate is oceanic (Köppen Cfb). Although Glasgow's latitude is similar to that of Moscow, the climate is strongly influenced by proximity to the Celtic Sea and the warm water of the North Atlantic Drift. Glasgow is the rainiest city in the UK, with an average of more than 170 days of rain a year. The coldest month on record since the data series began is December 2010, during a severe cold wave affecting the British Isles. Even then, the December high was above freezing at 1.6 °C (34.9 °F) with a low of −4.4 °C (24.1 °F). This still ensured Glasgow's coldest month of 2010 remained milder than the isotherm of −3 °C (27 °F) normally used to determine continental climate normals. The warmest day in Glasgow was recorded in 2018, when temperatures reached 31.9 °C (89.4 °F).

Climate data for Paisley (Note: Weather station is located 7 miles (11 km) from the Glasgow city centre.), elevation: 16 m (52 ft) 1991–2020 normals, extremes 1959–present
Month	Jan	Feb	Mar	Apr	May	Jun	Jul	Aug	Sep	Oct	Nov	Dec	Year
Record high °C (°F)	13.5 (56.3)	14.4 (57.9)	17.2 (63.0)	24.4 (75.9)	26.5 (79.7)	29.6 (85.3)	30.0 (86.0)	31.0 (87.8)	26.7 (80.1)	22.8 (73.0)	17.7 (63.9)	14.1 (57.4)	31.0 (87.8)
Mean daily maximum °C (°F)	7.2 (45.0)	7.8 (46.0)	9.8 (49.6)	13.0 (55.4)	16.1 (61.0)	18.4 (65.1)	19.8 (67.6)	19.3 (66.7)	16.7 (62.1)	13.0 (55.4)	9.6 (49.3)	7.4 (45.3)	13.2 (55.8)
Daily mean °C (°F)	4.6 (40.3)	5.0 (41.0)	6.5 (43.7)	9.0 (48.2)	11.8 (53.2)	14.3 (57.7)	15.9 (60.6)	15.6 (60.1)	13.3 (55.9)	9.9 (49.8)	6.9 (44.4)	4.7 (40.5)	9.8 (49.6)
Mean daily minimum °C (°F)	2.1 (35.8)	2.2 (36.0)	3.2 (37.8)	5.1 (41.2)	7.4 (45.3)	10.3 (50.5)	12.1 (53.8)	11.9 (53.4)	9.9 (49.8)	6.8 (44.2)	4.2 (39.6)	2.1 (35.8)	6.5 (43.7)
Record low °C (°F)	−14.8 (5.4)	−7.5 (18.5)	−8.3 (17.1)	−4.4 (24.1)	−1.1 (30.0)	1.5 (34.7)	3.9 (39.0)	2.2 (36.0)	−0.2 (31.6)	−3.5 (25.7)	−6.8 (19.8)	−14.5 (5.9)	−14.8 (5.4)
Average precipitation mm (inches)	146.4 (5.76)	115.2 (4.54)	97.4 (3.83)	66.1 (2.60)	68.8 (2.71)	67.8 (2.67)	82.9 (3.26)	94.8 (3.73)	98.4 (3.87)	131.8 (5.19)	131.8 (5.19)	161.4 (6.35)	1,262.8 (49.72)
Average precipitation days (≥ 1.0 mm)	17.7	14.7	13.8	12.3	12.1	12.1	13.3	13.9	13.9	16.2	17.3	16.9	174.3
Mean monthly sunshine hours	38.6	67.3	104.3	141.4	186.8	155.6	151.5	145.5	114.6	86.3	53.9	33.7	1,279.6
Source 1: Met Office
Source 2: Starlings Roost Weather

Climate data for Abbotsinch (Note: Weather station is located 7 miles (11 km) from the Glasgow city centre.), elevation: 8 m (26 ft), 1991–2020 normals, extremes 1951–present
Month	Jan	Feb	Mar	Apr	May	Jun	Jul	Aug	Sep	Oct	Nov	Dec	Year
Record high °C (°F)	13.6 (56.5)	14.4 (57.9)	20.3 (68.5)	24.0 (75.2)	27.4 (81.3)	31.9 (89.4)	30.1 (86.2)	31.2 (88.2)	28.8 (83.8)	23.9 (75.0)	16.4 (61.5)	14.6 (58.3)	31.9 (89.4)
Mean daily maximum °C (°F)	6.7 (44.1)	7.4 (45.3)	9.2 (48.6)	12.2 (54.0)	15.4 (59.7)	17.8 (64.0)	19.3 (66.7)	18.9 (66.0)	16.5 (61.7)	12.8 (55.0)	9.3 (48.7)	6.8 (44.2)	12.7 (54.9)
Daily mean °C (°F)	4.1 (39.4)	4.5 (40.1)	5.9 (42.6)	8.2 (46.8)	10.9 (51.6)	13.6 (56.5)	15.3 (59.5)	14.9 (58.8)	12.9 (55.2)	9.6 (49.3)	6.4 (43.5)	4.1 (39.4)	9.2 (48.6)
Mean daily minimum °C (°F)	1.5 (34.7)	1.6 (34.9)	2.6 (36.7)	4.2 (39.6)	6.5 (43.7)	9.4 (48.9)	11.2 (52.2)	10.9 (51.6)	9.2 (48.6)	6.4 (43.5)	3.6 (38.5)	1.4 (34.5)	5.7 (42.3)
Record low °C (°F)	−17.4 (0.7)	−15.0 (5.0)	−12.5 (9.5)	−5.4 (22.3)	−3.9 (25.0)	1.2 (34.2)	0.8 (33.4)	1.1 (34.0)	−4.0 (24.8)	−7.1 (19.2)	−10.4 (13.3)	−19.9 (−3.8)	−19.9 (−3.8)
Average precipitation mm (inches)	157.3 (6.19)	125.0 (4.92)	112.4 (4.43)	73.2 (2.88)	71.9 (2.83)	80.8 (3.18)	91.9 (3.62)	107.1 (4.22)	109.4 (4.31)	135.7 (5.34)	145.0 (5.71)	160.7 (6.33)	1,370.2 (53.94)
Average precipitation days (≥ 1.0 mm)	18.2	15.2	14.9	12.6	12.2	12.8	13.4	14.5	14.3	17.2	18.0	18.0	181.2
Mean monthly sunshine hours	45.9	70.0	106.1	148.2	197.2	159.2	162.7	152.9	117.9	84.9	57.5	41.7	1,344.1
Source 1: Met Office
Source 2: Starlings Roost Weather

== Demography ==
=== Population ===
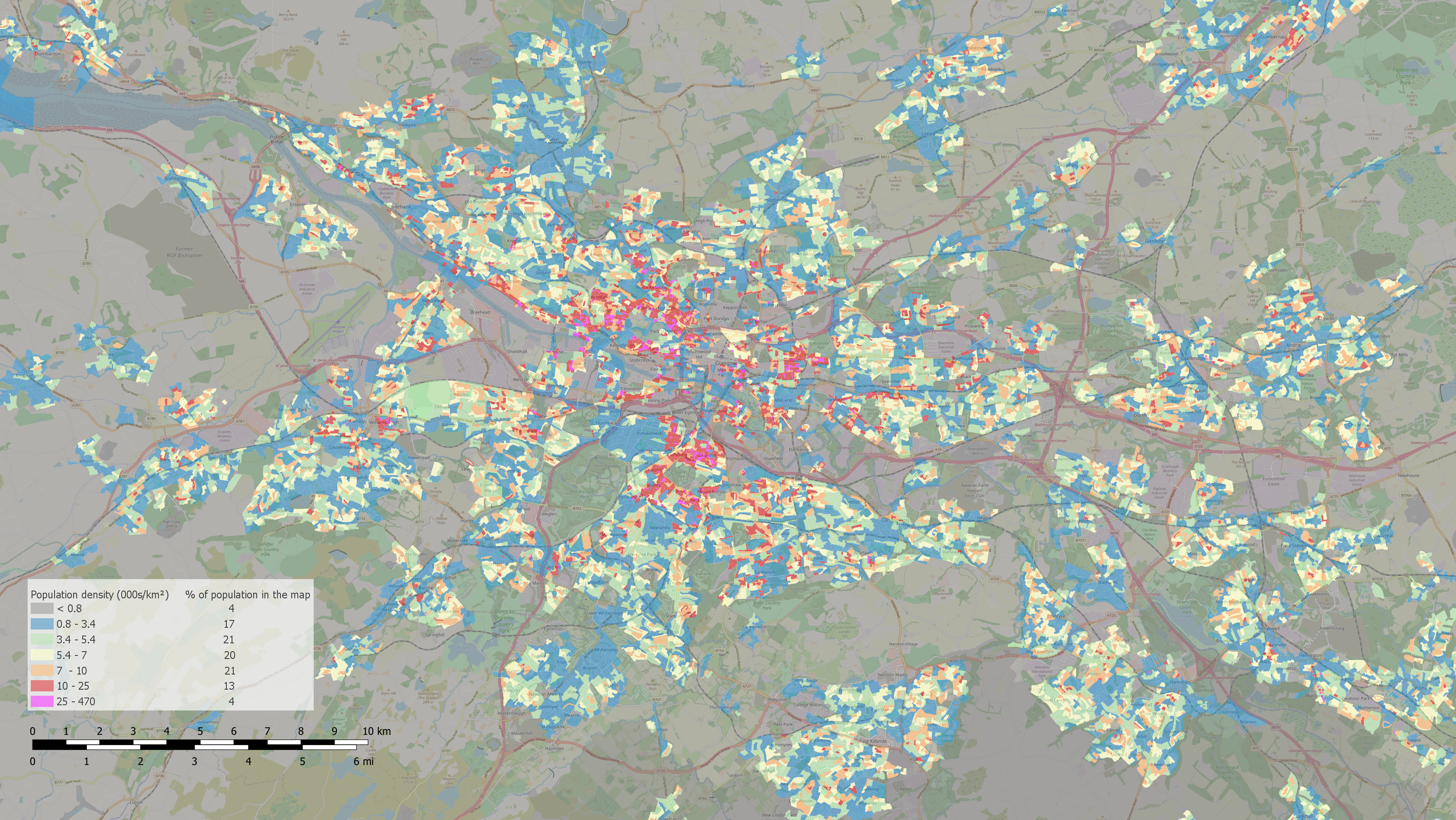
A map of Greater Glasgow's population density, 2011 census figures

In the 1950s, the population of the City of Glasgow area was some 1,089,000. Glasgow's inner-city areas were still densely populated. After the 1960s, the clearances of poverty-stricken inner city areas like the Gorbals and relocation to "new towns" such as East Kilbride and Cumbernauld led to population decline.

The urban area continues to expand beyond the city council boundaries into surrounding suburban areas, encompassing around 400 sq mi (1,040 km^{2}) of all adjoining suburbs, if commuter towns and villages are included. There are two distinct definitions for the population of Glasgow: the Glasgow City Council Area which lost the districts of Rutherglen and Cambuslang to South Lanarkshire in 1996, and the Greater Glasgow Urban Area which includes the conurbation around the city.

In the 2016 definitions, the aforementioned Rutherglen and Cambuslang were included with Paisley, Clydebank, Newton Mearns, Bearsden and Stepps but not others with no continuity of populated postcodes – although in some cases the gap is small – the excluded nearby settlements including Barrhead, Erskine and Kirkintilloch plus a large swathe of Lanarkshire which had been considered contiguous with Glasgow in previous definitions: the 'settlements' named Coatbridge & Airdrie, Hamilton and Motherwell & Wishaw, each containing a number of distinct smaller localities).

Population
Location	Population	Area	Density
Glasgow City Council Area	592,820	67.76 sq mi (175.5 km^{2})	8,541.8/sq mi (3,298.0/km^{2})
Greater Glasgow Urban Area	985,290	265 km^{2} (102 sq mi)	3,775/km^{2} (9,780/sq mi)
Source: Scotland's Census Results Online

Glasgow's population influx in the eighteenth and nineteenth centuries was related to economic expansion and internally generated growth. The vast majority of newcomers to Glasgow from outside of Scotland were from Ireland, especially the north western counties of Donegal, Fermanagh, Tyrone and Londonderry. In the 1881 UK Census, 83% of the population was born in Scotland, 13% in Ireland, 3% in England and 1% elsewhere. By 1911, the city was no longer gaining population by migration. The demographic percentages in the 1951 UK census were: born in Scotland 93%, Ireland 3%, England 3% and elsewhere 1%.

In the early twentieth century, many Lithuanian refugees began to settle in Glasgow and at its height in the 1950s, there were around 10,000 in the Glasgow area. Many Italian Scots also settled in Glasgow, originating from provinces like Frosinone in Lazio and Lucca in north-west Tuscany at this time, many originally working as "Hokey Pokey" men.

Historical population and city limits
Year	Population	Area (km^{2})	Density (inhabitants/km^{2})	Area changes
1300	1,500	–	–	Initial
1600	7,000	–	–	Unknown
1791	66,000	7.16	9,217	Anderson to James Street/West Nile Street to Camlachie
1831	202,426	8.83	22,924	Necropolis and Blythswood
1846	280,000	23.44	11,945	Burghs of Anderston and Calton/Barony of Gorbals
1872	494,824	24.42	20,263	Districts of Keppochhill, Alexandra Parade and the new Glasgow University grounds
1891	658,073	48.00	13,709	Burghs of Govanhill, Crosshill, Pollokshields, Maryhill and Hillhead. Districts of Mount Florida, Langside, Shawlands, Kelvinside, Possilpark, Springburn, Coplawhill and the rest of Gorbals
1901	761,712	51.35	14,833	Bellahouston Park and Craigton. Districts of Blackhill, Shawfield and the east end of Glasgow Green
1912	800,000	77.63	10,305	Burghs of Govan, Partick, Pollokshaws. Districts of Shettleston, Tollcross, West of Govan, Cathcart, Newlands, West of Partick, Dawsholm, Temple and Knightswood.
1921	1,034,174	77.63	13,321	No change
1926	1,090,380	119.42	9,130	Districts of Lambhill, Millerston, Aikenhead, Mansewood, Kennishead, Carntyne, Cardonald, Robroyston, Nitshill, Hurlet, Crookston, Cardonald, Scotstoun, Yoker and Knightswood.
1938	1,127,825	160.77	7,015	Districts of Balmuildy, Auchinairn, Cardowan, Gartloch, Queenslie, Linn Park, Jenny Lind, Easterhouse, Darnley, Penilee, Drumry, Drumchapel, Summerston, Hogganfield and Carntyne
1946	1,050,000	160.77	6,531	No change
1951	1,089,555	160.77	6,777	No change
1961	1,055,017	160.77	6,562	No change
1971	897,485	160.77	5,582	No change
1981	774,068	202.35	3,825	Burghs of Rutherglen, Cambuslang, Mount Vernon, Baillieston.
1991	688,600	202.67	3,397	Minor boundary change
2001	586,710	177.30	3,309	Rutherglen and Cambuslang transferred to South Lanarkshire.
2011	599,650	174.70	3,432	Minor boundary change

=== Languages ===
The 2022 Scottish Census reported that out of 603,199 residents aged three and over, 170,403 (28.2%) considered themselves able to speak or read the Scots language.

=== Ethnicity ===
Ethnic Groups
Ethnic Group	1976 estimations		1981 estimations		1991		2001		2011		2022	
Ethnic Group	Number	%	Number	%	Number	%	Number	%	Number	%		
White: Total	–	–	729,092	97.9%	641,336	96.75%	546,359	94.55%	524,561	88.42%	501,029	80.71%
White: Scottish	–	–	–	–	–	–	503,614	87.15%	466,241	78.59%	416,634	67.12%
White: Other British	–	–	–	–	–	–	20,934	3.62%	24,154	4.07%	35,011	5.64%
White: Irish	–	–	–	–	10,384	1.56%	11,467	1.98%	11,228	1.89%	11,130	1.79%
White: Gypsy/Traveller (Note: New category created for the 2011 census)	–	–	–	–	–	–	–	–	407	0.07%	201	0.03%
White: Polish	–	–	–	–	–	–	–	–	8,406	1.42%	12,183	1.96%
White: Other	–	–	–	–	–	–	10,344	1.79%	14,125	2.38%	25,870	4.17%
Asian, Asian Scottish or Asian British: Total	12,000	1.3%	–	–	18,242	2.75%	25,636	4.44%	47,758	8.05%	68,793	11.08%
Asian, Asian Scottish or Asian British: Indian	–	–	–	–	3,374	0.5%	4,173	0.72%	8,640	1.46%	13,990	2.25%
Asian, Asian Scottish or Asian British: Pakistani	–	–	–	–	10,945	1.65%	15,330	2.65%	22,405	3.78%	30,912	4.98%
Asian, Asian Scottish or Asian British: Bangladeshi	–	–	–	–	191	–	237	0.04%	458	0.08%	954	0.15%
Asian, Asian Scottish or Asian British: Chinese	–	–	–	–	2,780	0.41%	3,876	0.67%	10,689	1.80%	14,300	2.30%
Asian, Asian Scottish or Asian British: Asian Other	–	–	–	–	952	0.14%	2,020	0.35%	5,566	0.94%	8,640	1.39%
Black, Black Scottish or Black British	–	–	–	–	–	–	1,792	0.31%	–	–	–	–
African: Total	–	–	–	–	489	–	–	–	12,440	2.10%	22,272	3.59%
African: African, African Scottish or African British	–	–	–	–	489	–	–	–	12,298	2.07%	2,798	0.45%
African: Other African	–	–	–	–	–	–	–	–	142	0.02%	19,474	3.14%
Caribbean or Black: Total	–	–	–	–	709	–	–	–	1,806	0.30%	1,471	0.24%
Caribbean	–	–	–	–	220		–	–	783	0.13%	335	0.05%
Black	–	–	–	–	–	–	–	–	820	0.14%	96	0.02%
Caribbean or Black: Other	–	–	–	–	489		–	–	203	0.03%	1,033	0.17%
Mixed or multiple ethnic groups: Total	–	–	–	–	–	–	2,046	0.35%	2,879	0.49%	10,624	1.71%
Other: Total	–	–	–	–	1,840	0.27%	2,036	0.35%	3,801	0.64%	16,571	2.67%
Other: Arab	–	–	–	–	–	–	–	–	2,631	0.44%	8,671	1.40%
Other: Any other ethnic group	–	–	–	–	1,840	0.27%	2,036	0.35%	1,170	0.20%	7,903	1.27%
Non-White: Total	–	–	15,286	2.1%	21,517	3.25%	31,510	5.45%	68,684	11.58%	119,726	19.29%
Total:	–	–	744,378	100%	662,853	100%	577,869	100%	593,245	100%	620,756	100%

In the 1960s and 1970s, many Asians also settled in Glasgow, mainly in the Pollokshields area. These number 30,000 Pakistanis, 15,000 Indians and 3,000 Bangladeshis as well as Chinese people, many of whom settled in the Garnethill area of the city. The city is also home to some 8,406 (1.42%) Poles. Since 2000, the UK government has pursued a policy of dispersal of asylum seekers to ease pressure on social housing in the London area. In 2023, 88% of the near 5,100 asylum seekers in the whole of Scotland were living in Glasgow.

Since the United Kingdom Census 2001 the population decline has been reversed. The population was static for a time; but due to migration from other parts of Scotland as well as immigration from overseas, the population has begun to grow. The population of the city council area was 593,245 in 2011 and around 2,300,000 people live in the Glasgow travel to work area. This area is defined as consisting of more than 10% of residents travelling into Glasgow to work and is without fixed boundaries.

The population density of London following the 2011 census was recorded as 5,200 people per square kilometre, while 3,395 people per square kilometre were registered in Glasgow. In 1931, the population density was 16,166/sq mi (6,242/km^{2}), highlighting the "clearances" into the suburbs and new towns that were built to reduce the size of one of Europe's most densely populated cities.

In 2005, Glasgow had the lowest life expectancy of any UK city at 72.9 years. Much was made of this during the 2008 Glasgow East by-election. In 2008, a World Health Organization report about health inequalities revealed that male life expectancy varied from 54 years in Calton to 82 years in nearby Lenzie, East Dunbartonshire.

=== Religion ===
Glasgow is a city of significant religious diversity. In the 2022 census, the largest group with 43% had no religion, followed by the Roman Catholic Church which represented nearly 21% of the population.

The following table shows the religion of respondents in the 2001, 2011 and 2022 censuses in Glasgow.

Current religion	2001		2011		2022	
Current religion	Number	%	Number	%	Number	%
Christianity	374,393	64.79%	322,954	54.44%	240,337	38.72%
–Roman Catholic	168,733	29.20%	161,685	27.25%	128,743	20.74%
–Church of Scotland	182,172	31.52%	136,889	23.07%	82,585	13.30%
–Other Christian	23,488	4.06%	24,380	4.11%	29,009	4.67%
Islam	17,792	3.08%	32,117	5.41%	48,766	7.86%
Hinduism	1,209	0.21%	4,074	0.69%	8,166	1.32%
Buddhism	1,194	0.21%	2,570	0.43%	2,854	0.46%
Sikhism	2,374	0.41%	3,149	0.53%	3,456	0.56%
Judaism	1,083	0.19%	897	0.15%	973	0.16%
Paganism (Note: New category created for the 2022 census)	—N/a	—N/a	—N/a	—N/a	2,001	0.32%
Other religion	3,799	0.66%	1,599	0.27%	1,817	0.29%
No religion	131,189	22.70%	183,835	30.99%	268,327	43.23%
Religion not stated	44,836	7.76%	42,050	7.09%	44,076	7.10%
No religion/Not stated total	176,025	30.46%	225,885	38.08%	312,403	50.33%
Total population	577,869	100.00%	593,245	100.00%	620,756	100.00%

Protestant/Catholic affiliation in Glasgow, 2011 census

Church of Scotland

Roman Catholic

There are 147 congregations in the Church of Scotland's Presbytery of Glasgow, of which 104 are within the city boundaries, the other 43 being in adjacent areas. Within the city boundaries there are 65 parishes of the Roman Catholic Archdiocese of Glasgow and four parishes of the Diocese of Motherwell. The city has four Christian cathedrals: Glasgow Cathedral, of the Church of Scotland; St Andrew's Cathedral, of the Roman Catholic Church; St Mary's Cathedral, of the Scottish Episcopal Church, and St Luke's Cathedral, of the Greek Orthodox Church. The Baptist Church and Salvation Army are well represented.

Much of the city's Roman Catholic population are those of Irish ancestry. Biblical unitarians are represented by three Christadelphian ecclesias, referred to geographically, as "South", "Central" and "Kelvin".

The Sikh community is served by four Gurdwaras. Two are situated in the West End (Central Gurdwara Singh Sabha in Sandyford and Guru Nanak Sikh Temple in Kelvinbridge) and two in the Southside area of Pollokshields (Guru Granth Sahib Gurdwara and Sri Guru Tegh Bahadur Gurdwara). In 2013, Scotland's first purpose-built Gurdwara opened in a massive opening ceremony. Built at a cost of £3.8M, it can hold 1,500 worshippers. Central Gurdwara is currently constructing a new building in the city. There are almost 10,000 Sikhs in Scotland and the majority live in Glasgow.

Glasgow Central Mosque in the Gorbals district is the largest mosque in Scotland and, along with twelve other mosques in the city, caters for the city's Muslim population, estimated to number 33,000 in 2009. Glasgow also has a Hindu mandir. Glasgow has seven synagogues, including the Romanesque-revival Garnethill Synagogue in the city centre. In 2016, Glasgow had the seventh largest Jewish population in the United Kingdom after London, Manchester, Leeds, Gateshead, Brighton and Bournemouth but once had a Jewish population second only to London, estimated at 20,000 in the Gorbals alone. In 1993, the St Mungo Museum of Religious Life and Art opened in Glasgow. It is believed to be the only public museum to examine all the world's major religious faiths.

== Areas and suburbs ==
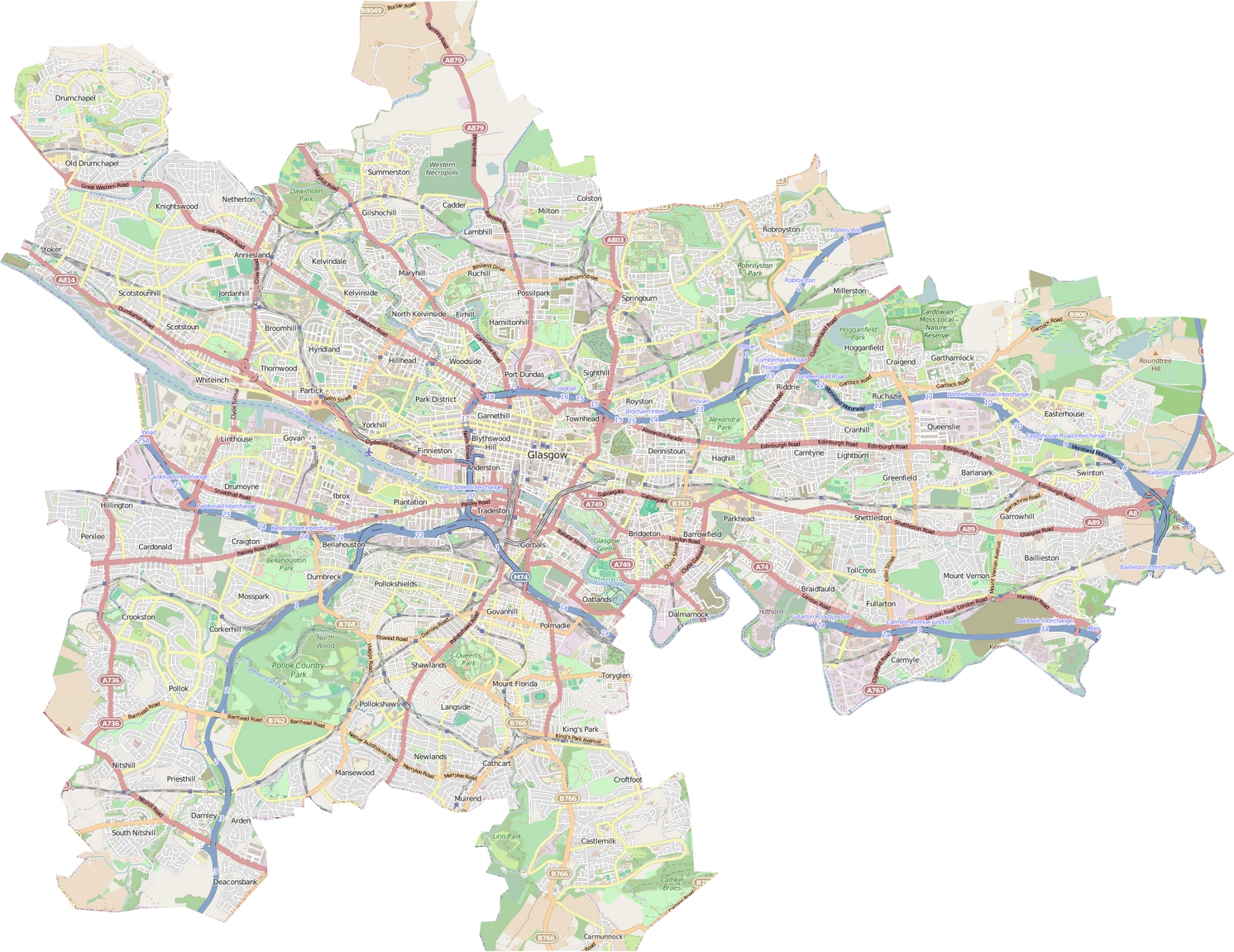
Areas of Glasgow. Click to enlarge.

=== City centre ===
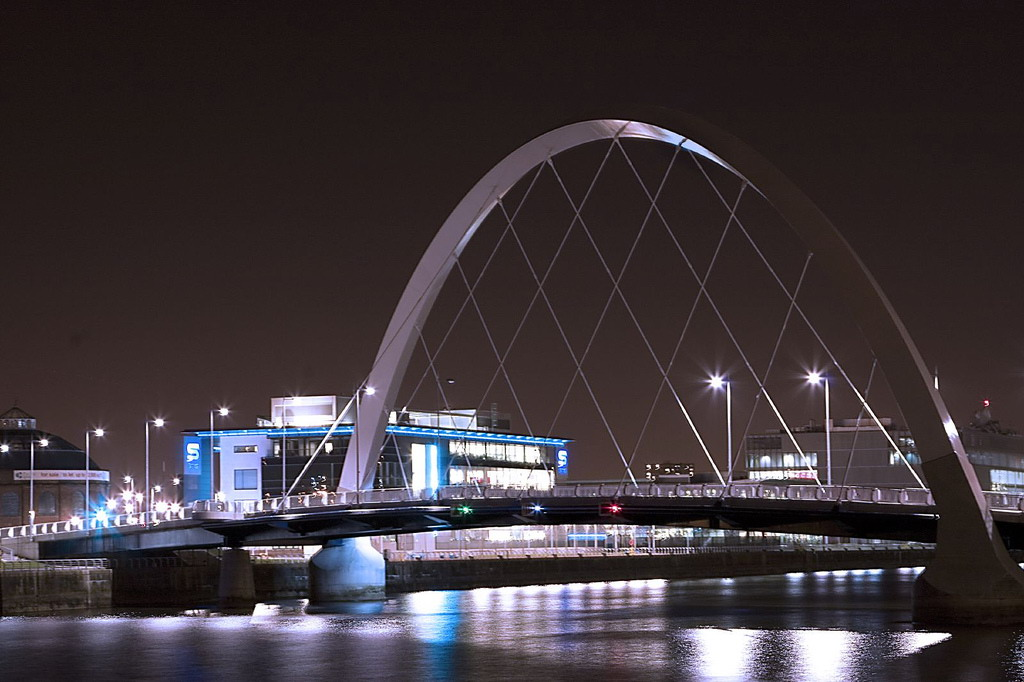
The Clyde Arc, also known locally as the "Squinty Bridge"

The city centre is bounded by High Street at Glasgow Cross the historic centre of civic life, up to Glasgow Cathedral at Castle Street; Saltmarket including Glasgow Green and St Andrew's Square to the east; Clyde Street and Broomielaw (along the River Clyde) to the south; and to Charing Cross and Elmbank Street, beyond Blythswood Square to the west. The northern boundary (from east to west) follows Cathedral Street to North Hanover Street and George Square. The city centre is based on a grid system of streets on the north bank of the River Clyde. The heart of the city is George Square, site of many of Glasgow's public statues and the elaborate Victorian Glasgow City Chambers, headquarters of Glasgow City Council.

Most offices, and the largest offices and international headquarters, are in the distinctive streets immediately west of Buchanan Street, starting around 1800 as townhouses, in the architecturally important streets embracing Blythswood Hill, Blythswood Holm further down and now including the Broomielaw next to the Clyde. To the south and west are the shopping precincts of Argyle Street, Sauchiehall Street and Buchanan Street, the last featuring more upmarket retailers and winner of the Academy of Urbanism "Great Street Award" 2008. The collection of shops around these streets accumulate to become known as "The Style Mile".

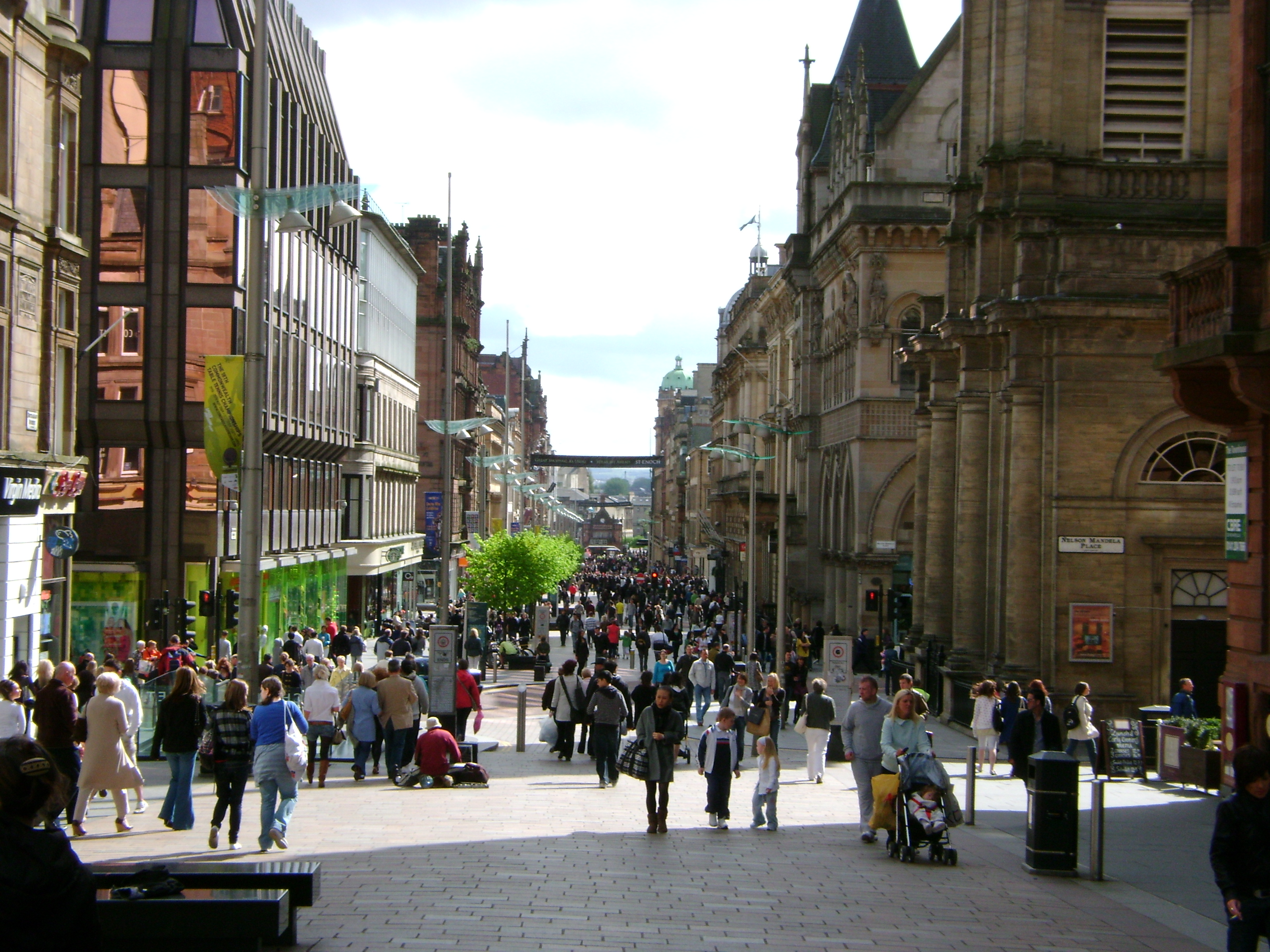
Looking down Buchanan Street towards St Enoch subway station

The main shopping areas include Buchanan Street, Buchanan Galleries, linking Buchanan Street and Sauchiehall Street, and the St. Enoch Centre linking Argyle Street and St Enoch Square, with the up-market Princes Square, which specifically features shops such as Ted Baker, Radley and Kurt Geiger. Buchanan Galleries and other city centre locales were chosen as locations for the 2013 film Under the Skin directed by Jonathan Glazer. Although the Glasgow scenes were shot with hidden cameras, star Scarlett Johansson was spotted around town. The Italian Centre in Ingram Street also specialises in designer labels. Glasgow's retail portfolio forms the UK's second largest and most economically important retail sector after Central London.

The large city centre is home to most of Glasgow's main cultural venues: the Glasgow Royal Concert Hall, Glasgow City Hall, Theatre Royal (performing home of Scottish Opera and Scottish Ballet), the Pavilion Theatre, the King's Theatre, National Piping Centre, Glasgow Film Theatre, Tron Theatre, Gallery of Modern Art (GoMA), Mitchell Library and Theatre, McLellan Galleries the former Centre for Contemporary Arts, and the Lighthouse Museum of Architecture.

The world's tallest cinema, the eighteen-screen Omniplex is situated on Renfrew Street. The city centre is also home to four of Glasgow's higher education institutions: the University of Strathclyde, the Royal Conservatoire of Scotland, Glasgow School of Art and Glasgow Caledonian University, and to the largest further education college in Britain – the City of Glasgow College in Cathedral Street, and its Riverside Campus on the Clyde.

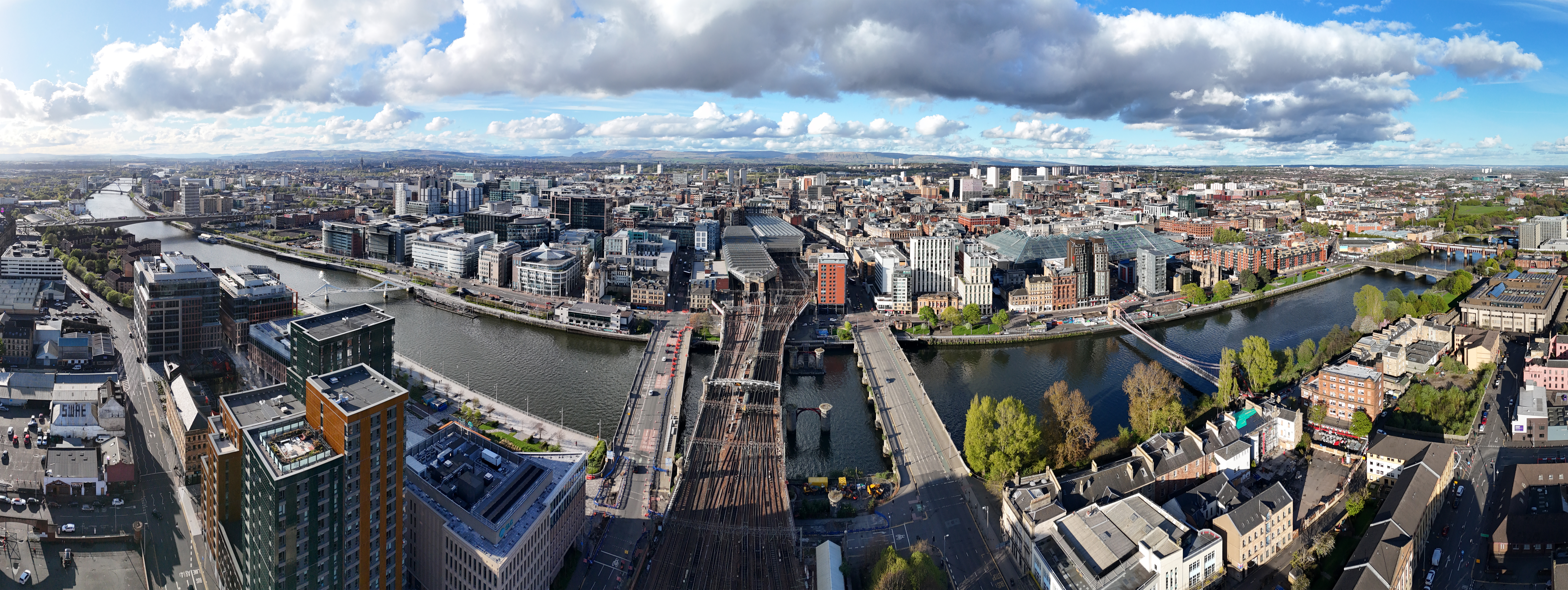
A panorama of Glasgow, 2025

=== Merchant City ===
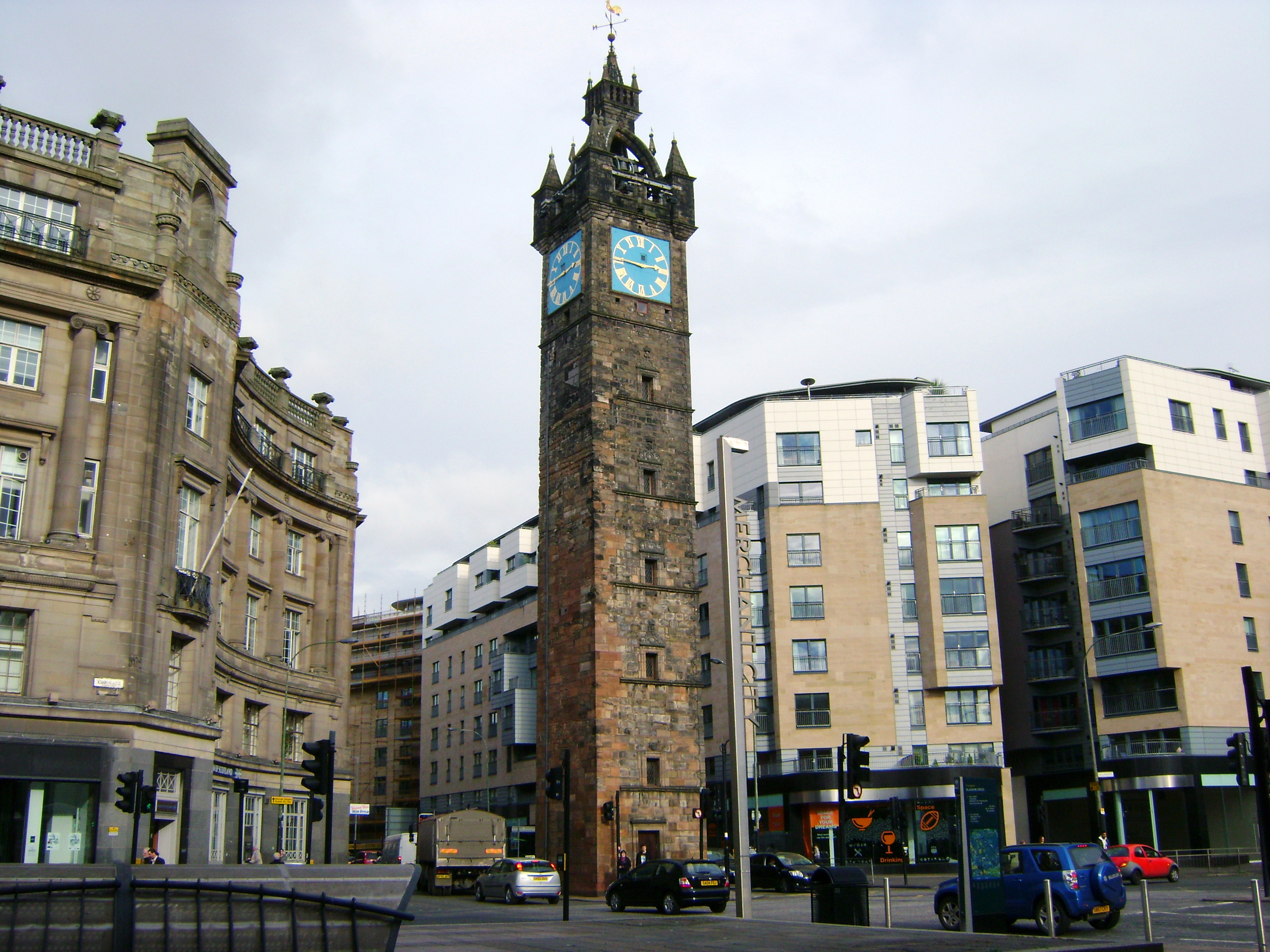
The Tolbooth Steeple dominates Glasgow Cross and marks the east side of the Merchant City.

In the city-centre is a commercial and part-residential district termed the Merchant City, a name first coined by the historian Charles Oakley in the 1960s, defined as the area between the High Street and George Square. This had grown from Glasgow Cross with many of the population involved in international trade and the textile industries of the 18th and early 19th centuries, with manufacturing warehouses nearby; including many created by resident Tobacco Lords from whom many of the streets take their name.

With its mercantile wealth, and continuing growth even before the Industrial Revolution, the area of the city-centre gradually expanded further by creating the New Town around George Square towards Buchanan Street, and soon very substantially by the building of the New Town of Blythswood on Blythswood Hill which includes Blythswood Square and reaching Charing Cross. The original medieval centre around Glasgow Cross and the High Street was left behind.

Glasgow Cross, situated at the junction of High Street, leading up to Glasgow Cathedral, Gallowgate, Trongate and Saltmarket was the original centre of the city, symbolised by its Mercat cross. Glasgow Cross encompasses the Tolbooth Steeple, all that remains of the original Glasgow Tolbooth, which was demolished in 1921. Moving northward up High Street towards Rottenrow and Townhead lies the 15th century Glasgow Cathedral and the Provand's Lordship. Due to growing industrial pollution levels in the mid-to-late 19th century, the area fell out of favour with residents.

From the 1980s onwards, the Merchant City has been rejuvenated with luxury city centre flats and warehouse conversions. This regeneration has supported an increasing number of cafés and restaurants. The area is also home to a number of high end boutique style shops and some of Glasgow's most upmarket stores.

The Merchant City is one part of Glasgow's growing "cultural quarter", based on King Street, the Saltmarket and Trongate, and spawned the annual Merchant City Festival. The area has supported a growth in art galleries, the origins of which can be found in the late 1980s when it attracted artist-led organisations that could afford the cheap rents required to operate in vacant manufacturing or retail spaces. The artistic and cultural potential of the Merchant City as a "cultural quarter" was harnessed by independent arts organisations and Glasgow City Council, and the recent development of Trongate 103, which houses galleries, workshops, artist studios and production spaces, is considered a major outcome of the continued partnership between both. The area also contains a number of theatres and concert venues, including the Tron Theatre, the Old Fruitmarket, the Trades Hall, St. Andrew's in the Square, Merchant Square, and the City Halls.

=== West End ===
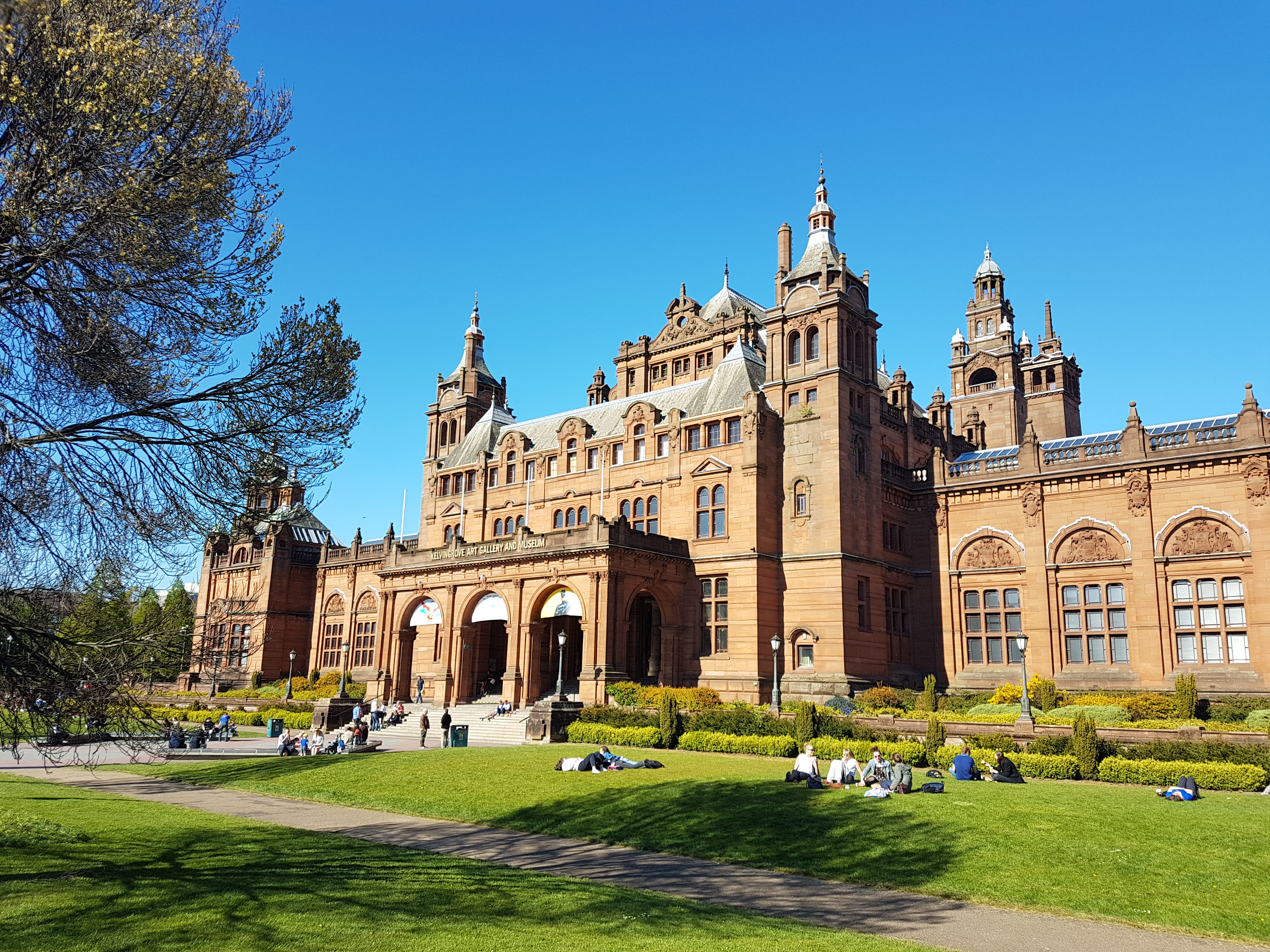
Kelvingrove Art Gallery and Museum is Glasgow's premier museum and art gallery, housing one of Europe's best civic art collections.

Glasgow's West End grew firstly from Buchanan Street to and around Blythswood Square and Garnethill, extending then to Woodlands Hill and Great Western Road. It is a district of townhouses and tenements with cafés, tea rooms, bars, boutiques, upmarket hotels, clubs and restaurants in the hinterland of Kelvingrove Park, the University of Glasgow, Glasgow Botanic Gardens and the Scottish Exhibition and Conference Centre, focused especially on the area's main thoroughfares of Argyle Street (Finnieston), Great Western Road and Byres Road.

The area is popular with tourists and students. The West End includes residential areas of Hillhead, Dowanhill, Kelvingrove, Kelvinside, Hyndland, Broomhill, Scotstoun, Jordanhill, Kelvindale, Anniesland and Partick. The name is also increasingly being used to refer to any area to the west of Charing Cross. The West End is bisected by the River Kelvin, which flows south-west from the Campsie Fells in the north and joins the River Clyde at Yorkhill, where a new pedestrian bridge has been built connecting the former burghs of Partick and Govan.

The spire of Sir George Gilbert Scott's Glasgow University main building, the second largest Gothic Revival building in Great Britain, is a major landmark, and can be seen from miles around, sitting atop Gilmorehill. Glasgow University, founded in 1451, is the second oldest in Scotland, and the fourth oldest in the English-speaking world. Much of the city's student population is based in the West End, adding to its cultural vibrancy.

The area is home to the Kelvingrove Art Gallery and Museum, Hunterian Museum and Art Gallery, Kelvin Hall museums and research facilities, stores, and community sport in Yorkhill. Adjacent to the Kelvin Hall was the Museum of Transport, which reopened in 2011 as the Riverside Museum, after moving to a new location on a former dockland site at Glasgow Harbour in Partick, where the River Kelvin flows into the Clyde. The new building is built to a design by Zaha Hadid. The West End Festival, one of Glasgow's largest festivals, is held annually in June.

Glasgow is the home of the SEC Centre, Great Britain's largest exhibition and conference centre. In September 2013, a major expansion of the SECC facilities at the former Queen's Dock by Foster and Partners opened – the 13,000-seat Hydro arena. Adjacent to the SECC at Queen's Dock is the Clydeside Distillery, a Scotch whisky distillery that opened in 2017 in the former dock pump house.

=== East End ===
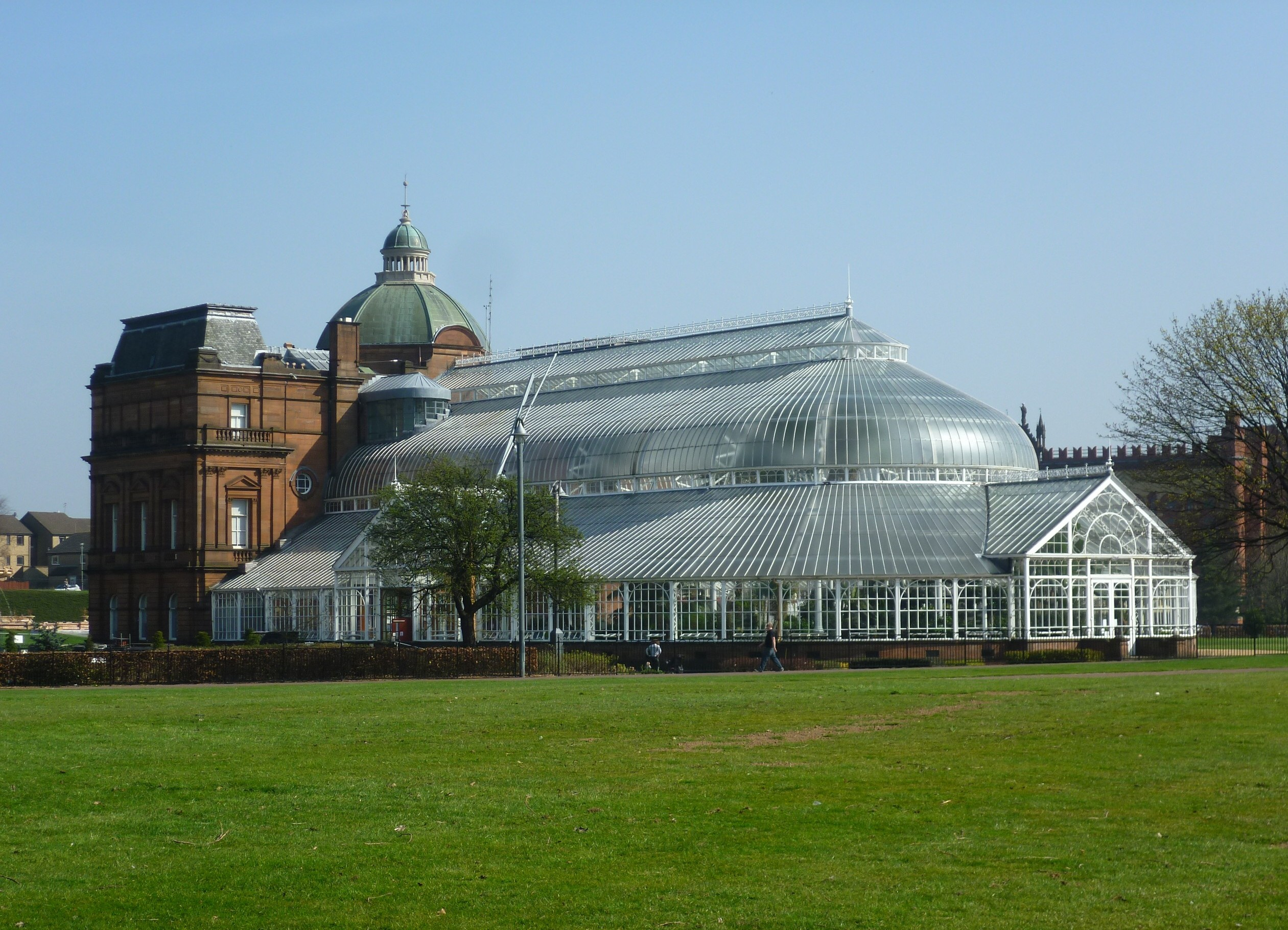
The People's Palace museum and Winter Garden on Glasgow Green

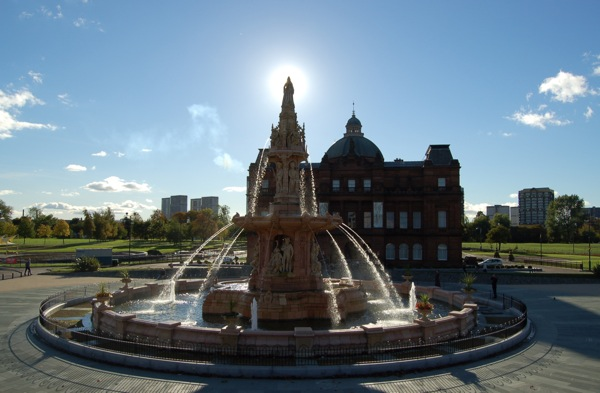
The Doulton Fountain in Glasgow Green

The East End extends from Glasgow Cross in the City Centre to the boundary with North and South Lanarkshire. It is home to the Glasgow Barrowland market, popularly known as "The Barras", Barrowland Ballroom, Glasgow Green, and Celtic Park, home of Celtic FC. Many of the original sandstone tenements remain in this district. The East End was once a major industrial centre, home to Sir William Arrol & Co., James Templeton & Co and William Beardmore and Company. A notable local employer continues to be the Wellpark Brewery, home of Tennent's Lager.

The Glasgow Necropolis Garden Cemetery was created by the Merchants House on a hill above the cathedral in 1831. Routes curve through the landscape uphill to the 21.3-metre-high (70 ft) statue of John Knox at the summit. There are two late 18th century tenements in Gallowgate. Dating from 1771 and 1780, both have been well restored. The construction of Charlotte Street was financed by David Dale, whose former scale can be gauged by the one remaining house, now run by the National Trust for Scotland.

Further along Charlotte Street stands a modern Gillespie, Kidd & Coia building of some note. Once a school, it has been converted into offices. Surrounding these buildings are a series of innovative housing developments conceived as "Homes for the Future", part of a project during the city's year as UK City of Architecture and Design in 1999.

East of Glasgow Cross is St Andrew's in the Square, the oldest post-Reformation church in Scotland, built in 1739–1757 and displaying a Presbyterian grandeur befitting the church of the city's wealthy tobacco merchants. Close by is the more modest Episcopalian St Andrew's-by-the-Green, the oldest Episcopal church in Scotland. The Episcopalian St Andrew's was also known as the "Whistlin' Kirk" due to it being the first church after the Reformation to own an organ. Overlooking Glasgow Green is the façade of Templeton On The Green, featuring vibrant polychromatic brickwork intended to evoke the Doge's Palace in Venice.

The extensive Tollcross Park was originally developed from the estate of James Dunlop, the owner of a local steelworks. His large baronial mansion was built in 1848 by David Bryce, which later housed the city's Children's Museum until the 1980s. Today, the mansion is a sheltered housing complex. The new Scottish National Indoor Sports Arena, a modern replacement for the Kelvin Hall, is in Dalmarnock. The area was the site of the Athletes' Village for the 2014 Commonwealth Games, located adjacent to the new indoor sports arena.

The East End Healthy Living Centre (EEHLC) was established in mid-2005 at Crownpoint Road with Lottery Funding and City grants to serve community needs in the area. Now called the Glasgow Club Crownpoint Sports Complex, the centre provides service such as sports facilities, health advice, stress management, leisure and vocational classes. To the north of the East End lie the two large gasometers of Provan Gas Works, which stand overlooking Alexandra Park and a major interchange between the M8 and M80 motorways.

=== South Side ===
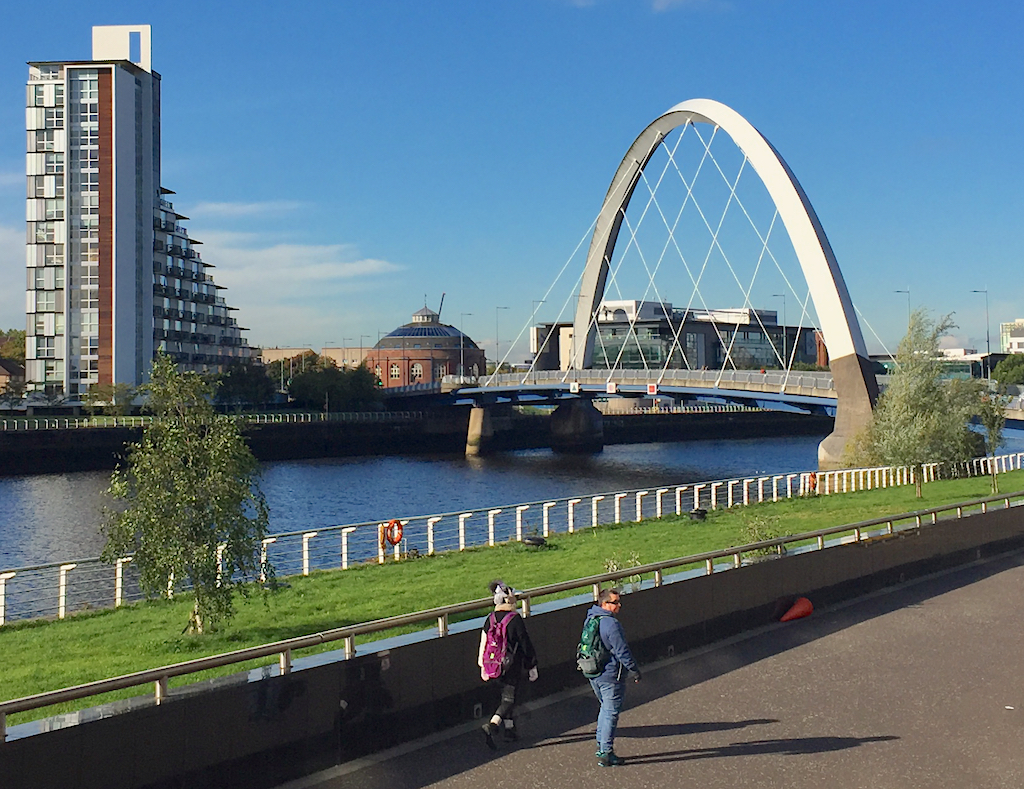
Pacific Quay sits within the south side of Glasgow, and is home to some of the city's largest businesses and employers.

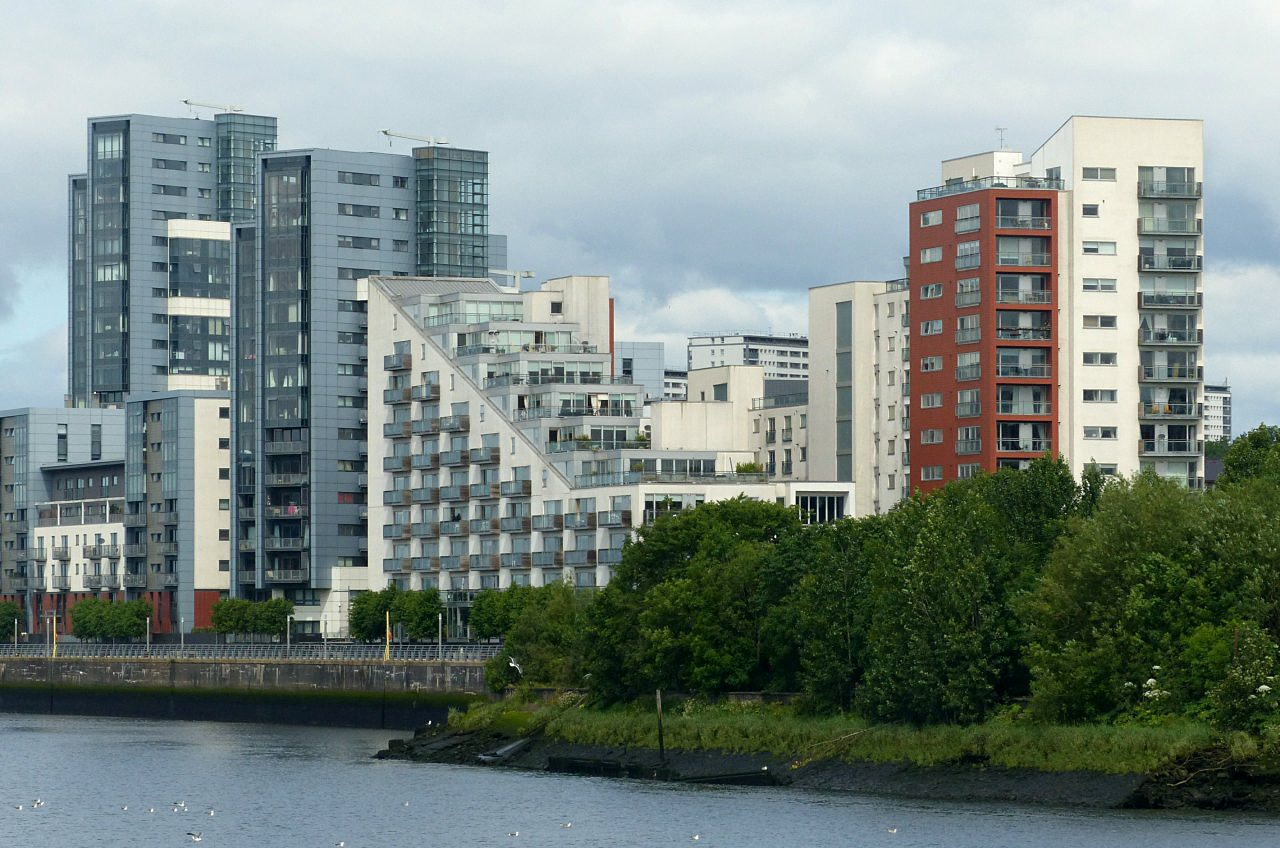
The regeneration of Glasgow Harbour has seen the construction of many high rise buildings

Glasgow's South Side sprawls out south of the Clyde. The adjoining urban area includes some of Greater Glasgow's most affluent suburban towns, such as Newton Mearns, Clarkston, and Giffnock, all of which are in East Renfrewshire, and Thorntonhall in South Lanarkshire. Newlands and Dumbreck are examples of high-value residential districts within the city boundaries. There are many areas containing a high concentration of sandstone tenements like Shawlands, which is considered the "Heart of the Southside", with other examples being Battlefield, Govanhill and Mount Florida.

The large suburb of Pollokshields comprises both a quiet western part with undulating tree-lined boulevards lined with expensive villas, and a busier eastern part with a high-density grid of tenements and small shops. The south side also includes some post-war housing estates of various sizes such as Toryglen, Pollok, Castlemilk and Arden. The towns of Cambuslang and Rutherglen were included in the City of Glasgow district from 1975 to 1996, but are now in the South Lanarkshire council area.

Although predominantly residential, the area does have several notable public buildings including, Charles Rennie Mackintosh's Scotland Street School Museum and House for an Art Lover; the Burrell Collection in Pollok Country Park; Alexander "Greek" Thomson's Holmwood House villa; the National Football Stadium Hampden Park in Mount Florida (home of Queens Park FC) and Ibrox Stadium (home of Rangers FC). The former docklands site at Pacific Quay on the south bank of the River Clyde, opposite the SECC, is the site of the Glasgow Science Centre and the headquarters of BBC Scotland and STV Group (owner of STV), in a new purpose-built digital media campus. In addition, several new bridges spanning the River Clyde have been built, including the Clyde Arc known by locals as the Squinty Bridge at Pacific Quay and others at Tradeston and Springfield Quay.

The South Side also includes many public parks, including Linn Park, Queen's Park, and Bellahouston Park and several golf clubs, including the championship course at Haggs Castle. The South Side is also home to the large Pollok Country Park, which was awarded the accolade of Europe's Best Park 2008. The southside also directly borders Rouken Glen Park in neighbouring Giffnock. Pollok Park is Glasgow's largest park and until the early 2000s was the only country park in the city's boundary. In the early 2000s the Dams to Darnley Country Park was designated, although half of the park is in East Renfrewshire. As of 2021 the facilities at the still new park are quite lacking.

Govan is a district and former burgh in the south-western part of the city. It is situated on the south bank of the River Clyde, opposite Partick. It was an administratively independent Police Burgh from 1864 until it was incorporated into the expanding city of Glasgow in 1912. Govan has a legacy as an engineering and shipbuilding centre of international repute and is home to one of two BAE Systems Surface Ships shipyards on the River Clyde and the precision engineering firm, Thales Optronics. It is also home to the Queen Elizabeth University Hospital, one of the largest hospitals in the country, and the maintenance depot for the Glasgow Subway system. The wider Govan area includes the districts of Ibrox, Cessnock, Kinning Park and Kingston.

=== North Glasgow ===
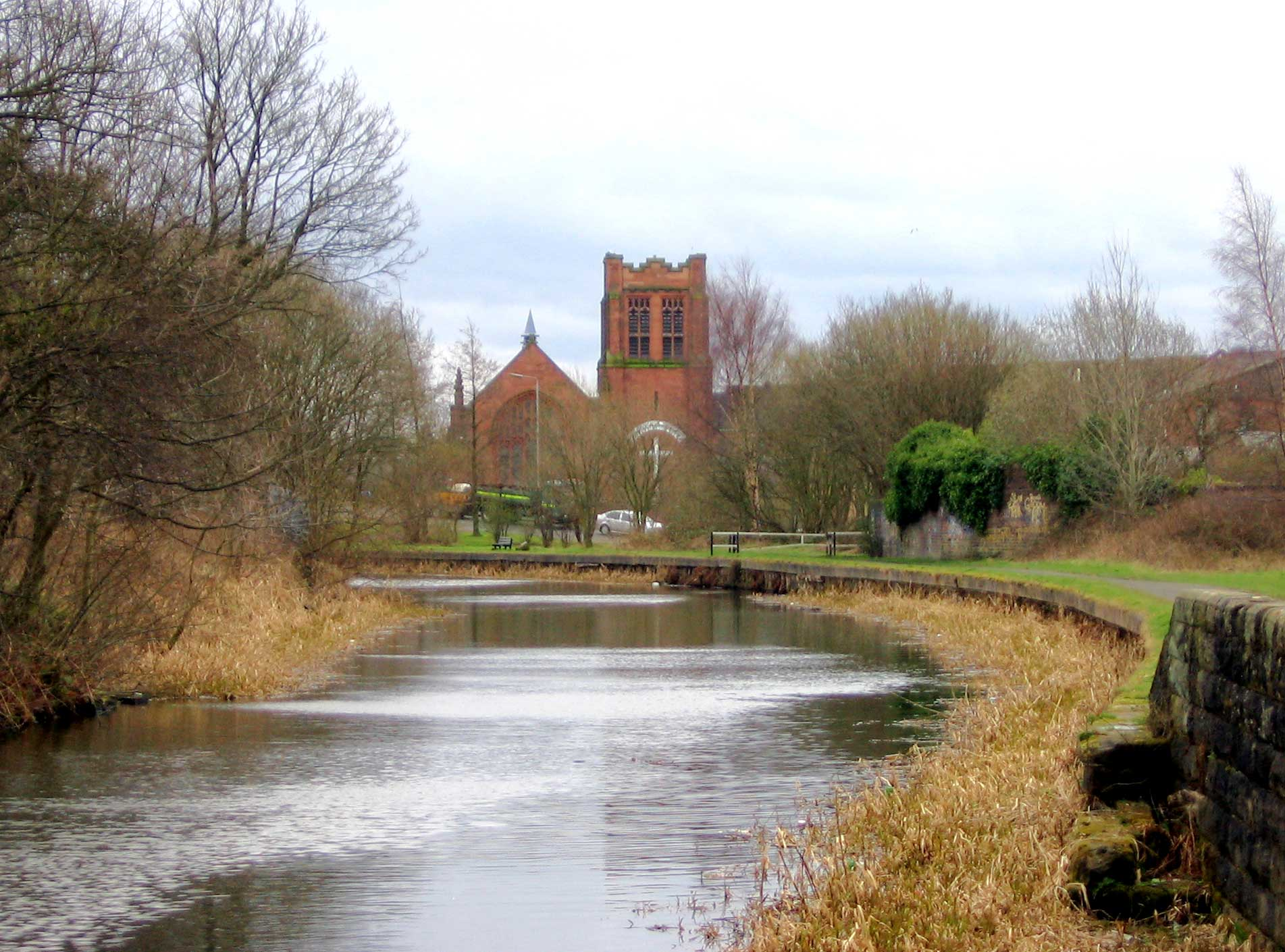
Ruchill Church, seen from the Forth and Clyde Canal

North Glasgow extends out from the north of the city centre towards the affluent suburbs of Bearsden, Milngavie and Bishopbriggs in East Dunbartonshire and Clydebank in West Dunbartonshire. The area also contains some of the city's poorest residential areas. This has led to large-scale redevelopment of much of the poorer housing stock in north Glasgow, and the wider regeneration of many areas, such as Ruchill, which have been transformed; many run-down tenements have now been refurbished or replaced by modern housing estates.

Much of the housing stock in north Glasgow is rented social housing, with a high proportion of high-rise tower blocks, managed by the North Glasgow Housing Association trading as NG Homes and Glasgow Housing Association. Maryhill consists of well maintained traditional sandstone tenements. Although historically a working class area, its borders with the upmarket West End of the city mean that it is relatively wealthy compared to the rest of the north of the city, containing affluent areas such as Maryhill Park and North Kelvinside. Maryhill is also the location of Firhill Stadium, home of Partick Thistle F.C. since 1909. The junior team, Maryhill F.C. are also located in this part of north Glasgow.

The Forth and Clyde Canal passes through this part of the city, and at one stage formed a vital part of the local economy. It was for many years polluted and largely unused after the decline of heavy industry, but recent efforts to regenerate and re-open the canal to navigation have seen it rejuvenated, including art campuses at Port Dundas. Sighthill was home to Scotland's largest asylum seeker community but the area is now regenerated as part of the Youth Olympic Games bid.

A huge part of the economic life of Glasgow was once located in Springburn, where the Saracen Foundry, engineering works of firms like Charles Tennant and locomotive workshops employed many Glaswegians. Glasgow dominated this type of manufacturing, with 25% of all the world's locomotives being built in the area at one stage. It was home to the headquarters of the North British Locomotive Company. Today part of the Glasgow Works continues in use as a railway maintenance facility, all that is left of the industry in Springburn. It is proposed for closure in 2019. Riddrie in the north east was intensively developed in the 1920s and retains several listed developments in the Art Deco style.

== Culture ==
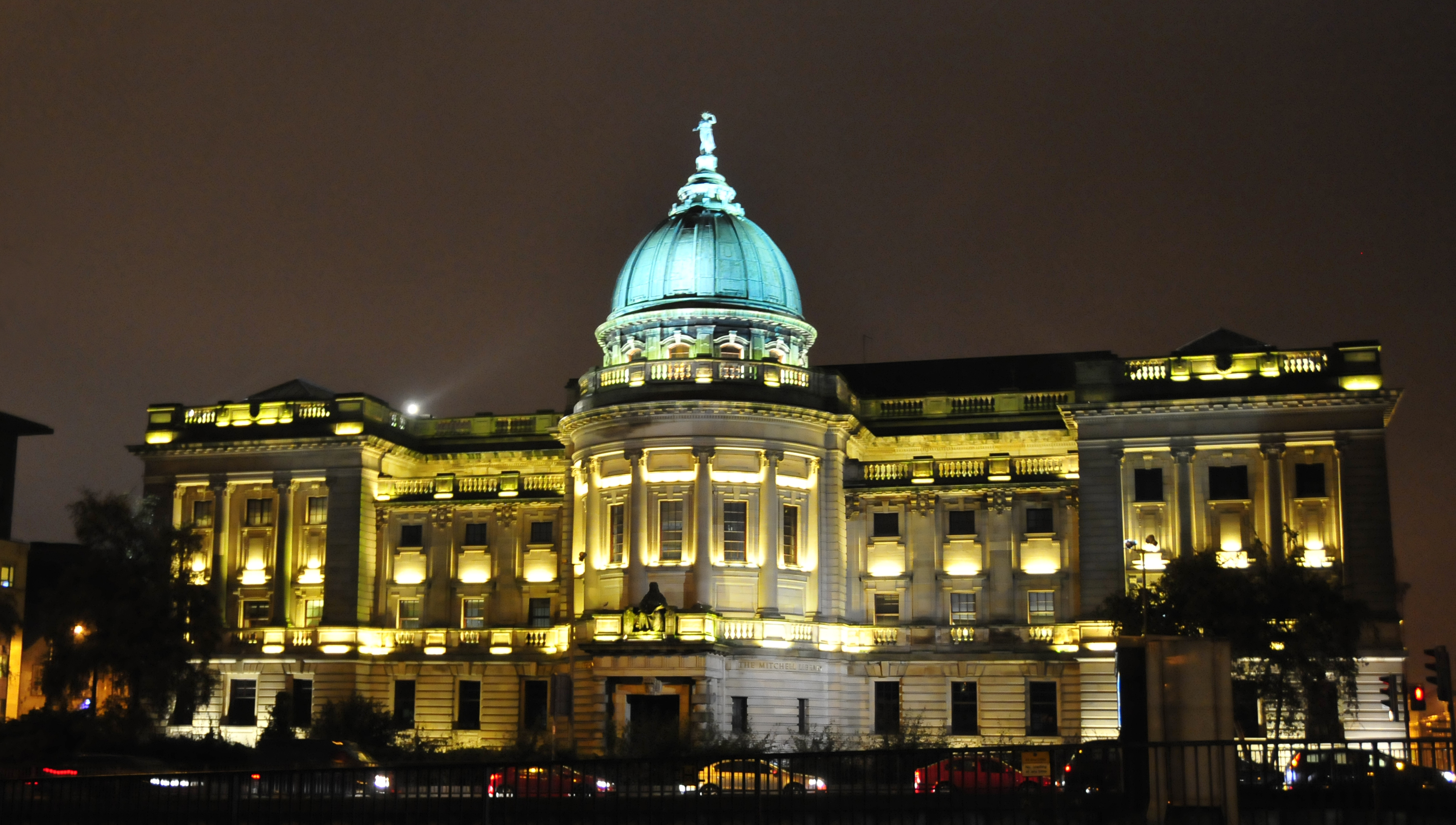
Established by wealthy tobacco merchant Stephen Mitchell, the Mitchell Library is now one of the largest public reference libraries in Europe.

Glasgow has many amenities for a wide range of cultural activities, from curling to opera and ballet and from football to art appreciation; it also has a large selection of museums and art galleries noted in the following section. Many of the city's cultural sites were celebrated in 1990 when Glasgow was designated European Capital of Culture.

Glasgow's principal municipal library, the Mitchell Library, has grown into one of the largest public reference libraries in Europe, currently housing some 1.3 million books, an extensive collection of newspapers and thousands of photographs and maps. Of academic libraries, Glasgow University Library started in the 15th century and is one of the oldest and largest libraries in Europe, with unique and distinctive collections of international status.

Most of Scotland's national arts organisations are based in Glasgow, including Scottish Opera, Scottish Ballet, National Theatre of Scotland, Royal Scottish National Orchestra, BBC Scottish Symphony Orchestra and Scottish Youth Theatre.

Glasgow has its own Poet Laureate, a post created in 1999 for Edwin Morgan and occupied by Liz Lochhead from 2005 until 2011, when she stood down to take up the position of Scots Makar. Jim Carruth was appointed to the position of Poet Laureate for Glasgow in 2014 as part of the 2014 Commonwealth Games legacy.

In 2013, PETA declared Glasgow to be the most vegan-friendly city in the UK.

=== Recreation ===
Glasgow is home to major theatres including the Theatre Royal, the King's Theatre, Pavilion Theatre and the Citizens Theatre and home to many museums and art galleries, the largest and most famous being the Kelvingrove Art Gallery and Museum, the Hunterian Museum and Art Gallery, Burrell Collection, and the Gallery of Modern Art (GoMA). Most of the museums and galleries in Glasgow are publicly owned and free to enter.

Glasgow has hosted many exhibitions over the years from the 1888 International Exhibition and 1901 International Exhibition to the Empire Exhibition 1938, including more recently The Glasgow Garden Festival in 1988, being the UK City of Architecture 1999, European Capital of Culture 1990, National City of Sport 1995–1999 and European Capital of Sport 2003. Glasgow has also hosted the National Mòd no less than twelve times since 1895.

Unlike the older and larger Edinburgh Festival, where all Edinburgh's main festivals occur in the last three weeks of August, Glasgow's festivals fill the calendar. Festivals include the Glasgow International Comedy Festival, Glasgow International Festival of Visual Art, Glasgow International Jazz Festival, Celtic Connections, Glasgow Fair, Glasgow Film Festival, West End Festival, Merchant City Festival, Glasgay, and the World Pipe Band Championships.

=== Music scene ===
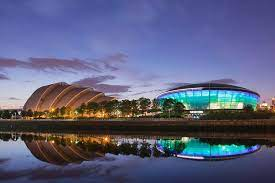
The OVO Hydro arena (right) is the second-busiest arena venue in the world. The SEC Armadillo is located to its left

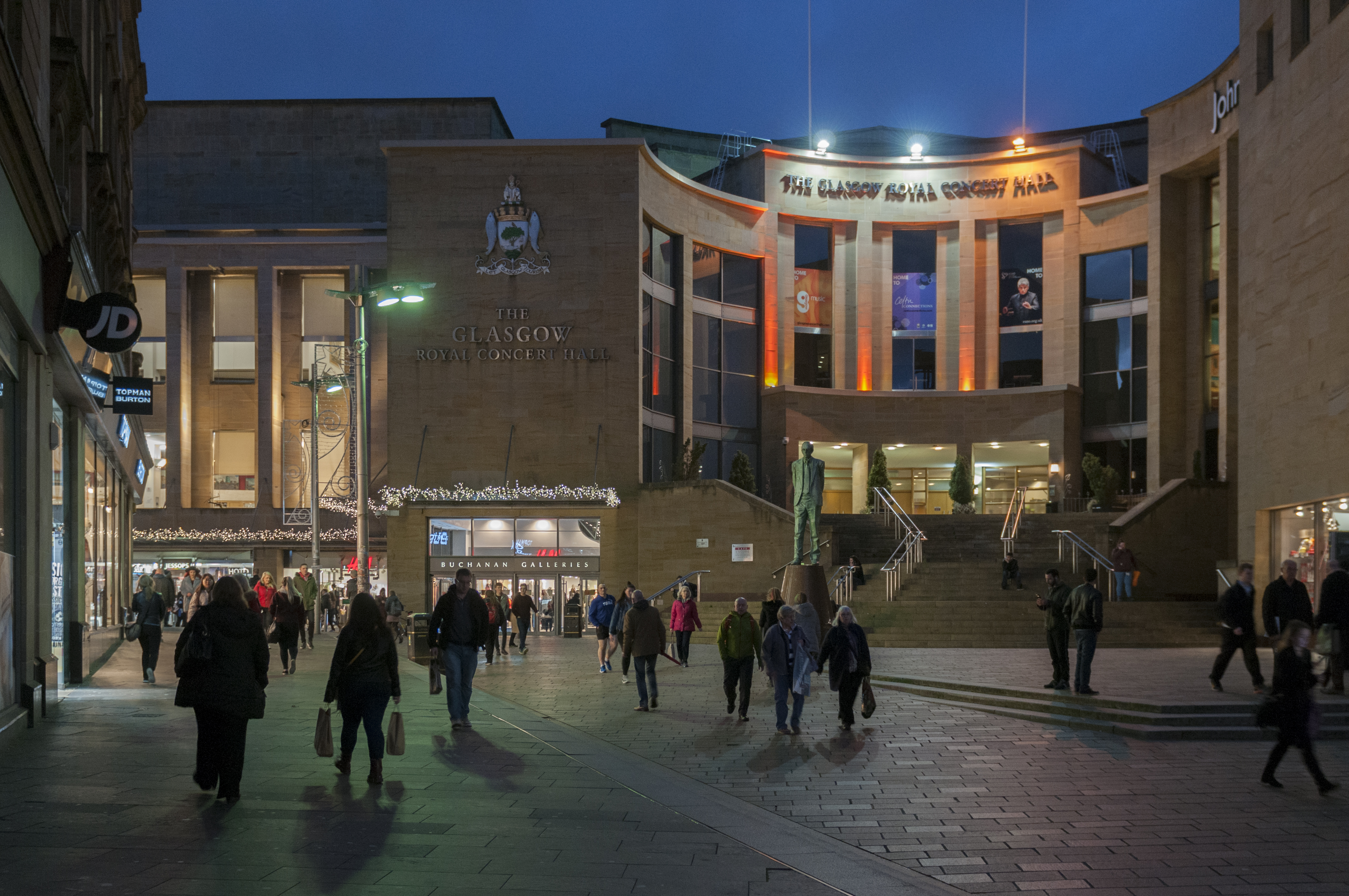
The Glasgow Royal Concert Hall

Glasgow is home to numerous orchestras, ensembles and bands including those of Scottish Opera, Scottish Ballet, Royal Scottish National Orchestra, BBC Scottish Symphony Orchestra and related to the Royal Conservatoire of Scotland, the National Youth Orchestra of Scotland and the Universities and Colleges. Choirs of all type are well supported. Glasgow has many live music venues, pubs, and clubs.

Some of Glasgow's more well-known venues include the Glasgow Royal Concert Hall, The OVO Hydro, the SECC, Glasgow Cathouse, The Art School, King Tut's Wah Wah Hut (where Oasis were spotted and signed by Glaswegian record mogul Alan McGee), the Queen Margaret Union (who have Kurt Cobain's footprint locked in a safe), the Barrowland, a ballroom converted into a live music venue as well as The Garage, which is the largest nightclub in Scotland.

More recent mid-sized venues include ABC, destroyed in the art school fire in June 2018, and the O_{2} Academy, which play host to a similar range of acts. There are also a large number of smaller venues and bars, which host many local and touring musicians, including Stereo, 13th Note and Nice N Sleazy. Most recent recipient of the SLTN Music Pub of the Year award was Bar Bloc, awarded in November 2011. In 2010, Glasgow was named the UK's fourth "most musical" city by PRS for Music. Glasgow is also the "most mentioned city in the UK" in song titles, outside London according, to a chart produced by PRS for music, with 119, ahead of closest rivals Edinburgh who received 95 mentions.

Since the 1980s, the success of bands such as The Blue Nile, Gun, Simple Minds, Del Amitri, Texas, Hipsway, Love & Money, Idlewild, Deacon Blue, Orange Juice, Lloyd Cole and the Commotions, Teenage Fanclub, Belle and Sebastian, Camera Obscura, Franz Ferdinand, Mogwai, Travis, and Primal Scream has significantly boosted the profile of the Glasgow music scene, prompting Time magazine to liken Glasgow to Detroit during its 1960s Motown heyday. Artists to achieve success from Glasgow during the 2000s and 2010s include The Fratellis, Chvrches, Rustie, Vukovi, Glasvegas and Twin Atlantic. The city of Glasgow was appointed a UNESCO City of Music on 20 August 2008 as part of the Creative Cities Network.

Glasgow's contemporary dance music scene has been spearheaded by Slam, and their record label Soma Quality Recordings, with their Pressure club nights attracting DJs and clubbers from around the world; these nights were hosted by The Arches but moved to Sub Club after the closure of the former in 2015, also taking place at the SWG3 arts venue. The Sub Club has regularly been nominated as one of the best clubs in the world.

The MOBO Awards were held at the SECC on 30 September 2009, making Glasgow the first city outside London to host the event since its launch in 1995. On 9 November 2014, Glasgow hosted the 2014 MTV Europe Music Awards at The OVO Hydro, it was the second time Scotland hosted the show since 2003 in Edinburgh and overall the fifth time that the United Kingdom has hosted the show since 2011 in Belfast, Northern Ireland. The event was hosted by Nicki Minaj and featured performances from Ariana Grande, Enrique Iglesias, Ed Sheeran, U2 and Slash.

=== Media ===
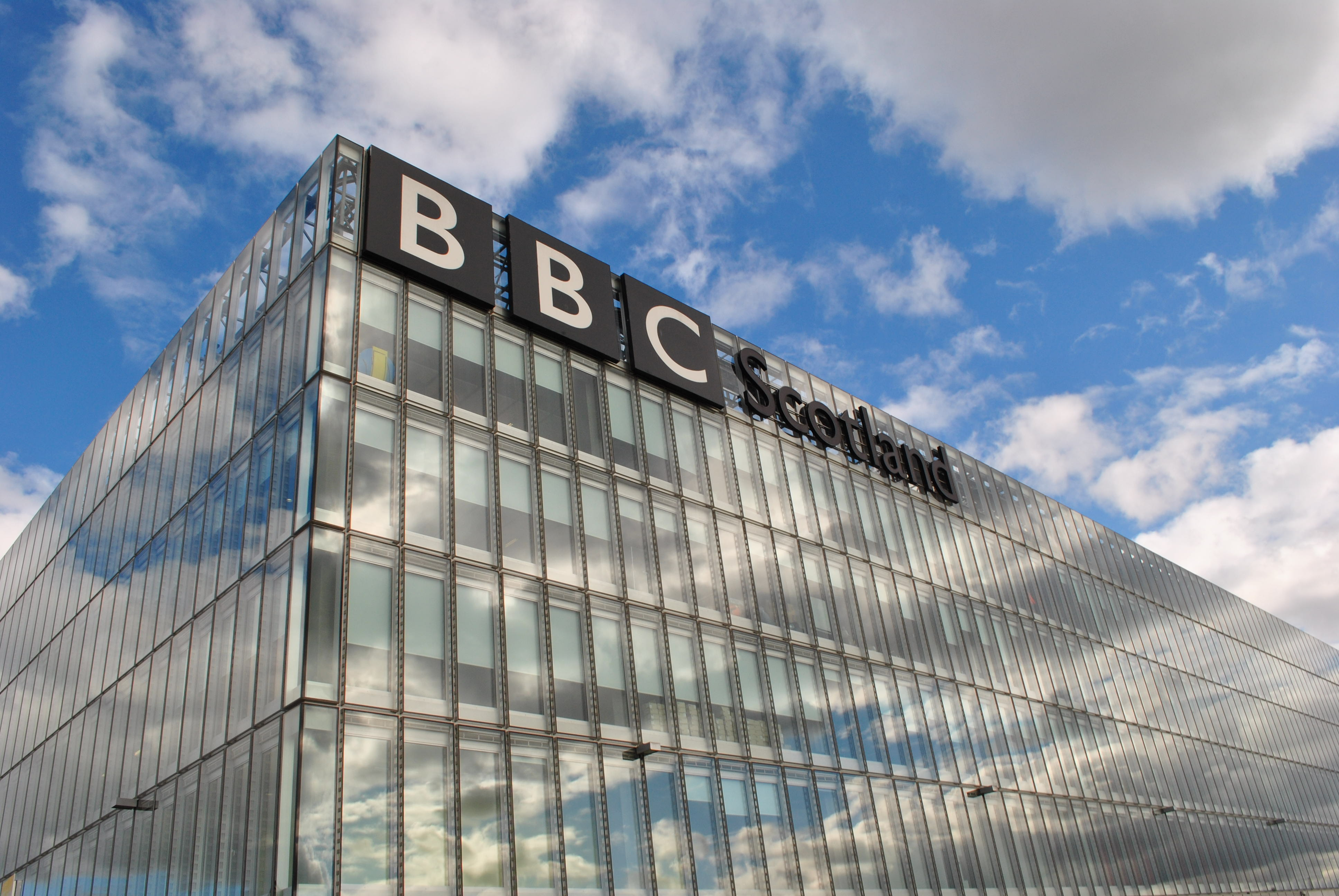
Pacific Quay is the home of the headquarters of Scotland's main broadcaster, BBC Scotland, based at BBC Pacific Quay

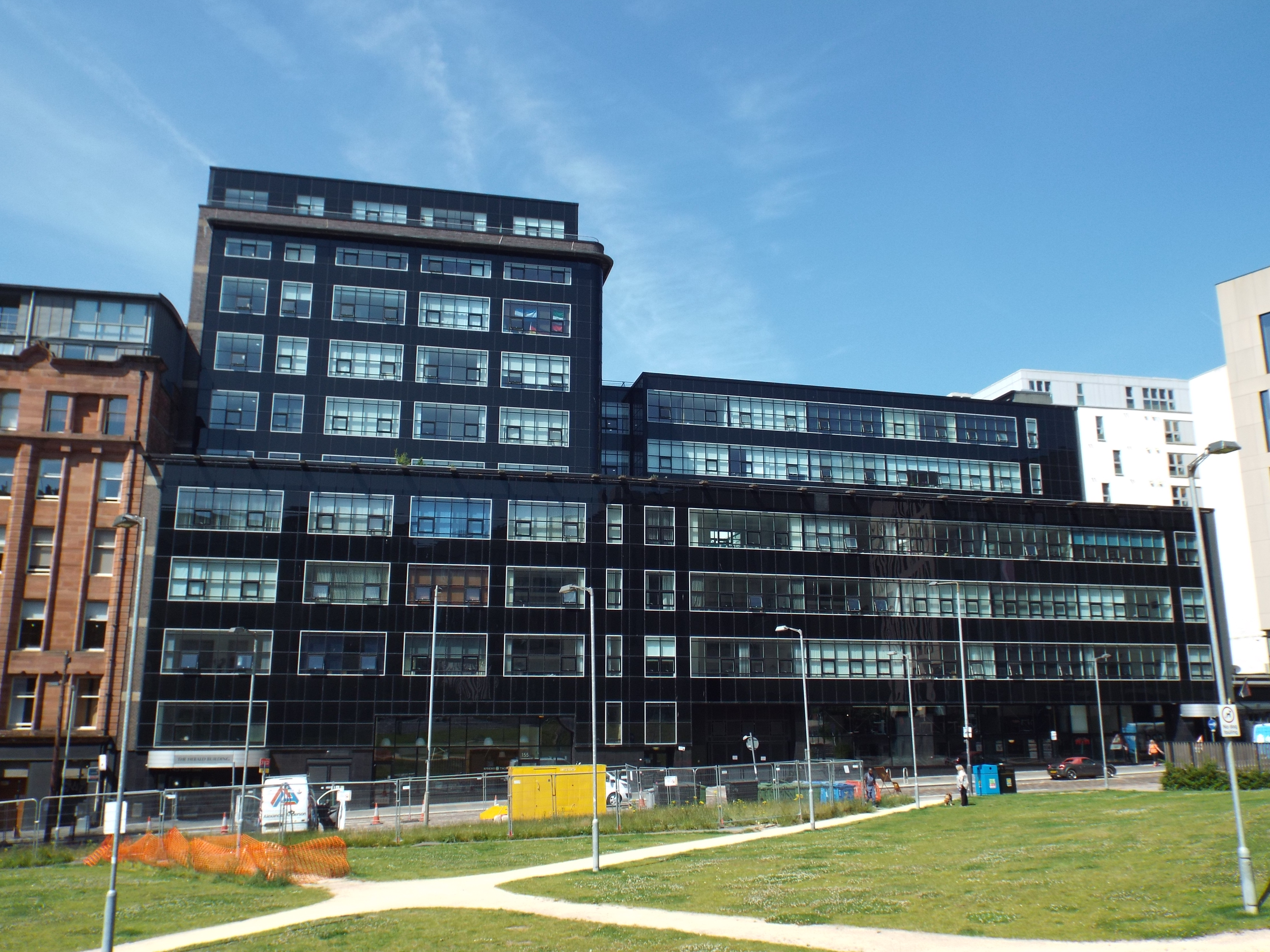
The Herald building on Albion Street

There has been a considerable number of films made about Glasgow or in Glasgow. Both BBC Scotland and STV have their headquarters in Glasgow. Television programs filmed in Glasgow include Rab C. Nesbitt, Taggart, Tutti Frutti, High Times, River City, City Lights, Chewin' the Fat, Still Game, Limmy's Show and Lovesick. Most recently, the long-running series Question Time and the early-evening quiz programme Eggheads moved its production base to the city. Most National Lottery game shows are also filmed in Glasgow. Children's game show Copycats is filmed there, and the Irish/UK programme Mrs. Brown's Boys is filmed at BBC Scotland.

The Scottish press publishes various newspapers in the city such as The Evening Times, The Herald, The Sunday Herald, the Sunday Mail and the Daily Record. Scottish editions of Trinity Mirror and News International titles are printed in the city. STV Group is a Glasgow-based media conglomerate with interests in television, and publishing advertising. STV Group owns and operates both Scottish ITV franchises (Central Scotland and Grampian), both branded STV.

Glasgow had its own television channel, STV Glasgow, which launched in June 2014, which also shows some of Glasgow's own programs filmed at the STV headquarters in Glasgow. Shows included The Riverside Show, Scottish Kitchen, City Safari, Football Show and Live at Five. STV Glasgow merged with STV Edinburgh to form STV2 in April 2017 which eventually closed in June 2018.

Various radio stations are also located in Glasgow. BBC Radio Scotland, the national radio broadcaster for Scotland, is located in the BBC's Glasgow headquarters alongside its Gaelic-language sister station, which is also based in Stornoway. Bauer Radio owns the principal commercial radio stations in Glasgow: Clyde 1 and Greatest Hits Radio Glasgow & The West, which can reach more than 2.3 million listeners. In 2004, STV Group plc, then known as SMG plc, sold its 27.8% stake in Scottish Radio Holdings to the broadcasting group EMAP for £90.5 million.

Other stations broadcasting from Glasgow include Smooth Scotland, Heart Scotland, which are owned by Global. Global Radio's Central Scotland radio station Capital Scotland also broadcasts from studios in Glasgow. Nation Radio Scotland, owned by Nation Broadcasting, also broadcasts from the city. The city has a strong community radio sector, including Celtic Music Radio, Subcity Radio, Radio Magnetic, Sunny Govan Radio, AWAZ FM and Insight Radio.

=== Language ===
Glasgow is Scotland's main locus of Gaelic language use outside the Highlands and Islands. In 2011, 5,878 residents of the city over age 3 spoke Gaelic, amounting to 1.0% of the population. Of Scotland's 25 largest cities and towns, only Inverness, the unofficial capital of the Highlands, has a higher percentage of Gaelic speakers. In the Greater Glasgow area there were 8,899 Gaelic-speakers, amounting to 0.8% of the population. Both the Gaelic language television station BBC Alba and the Gaelic language radio station BBC Radio nan Gàidheal have studios in Glasgow, their only locations outside the Highlands and Islands.

The 2022 Scottish Census reported that out of 603,203 residents aged three and over, 10,989 (1.8%) considered themselves able to speak or read Gaelic.

=== Architecture ===
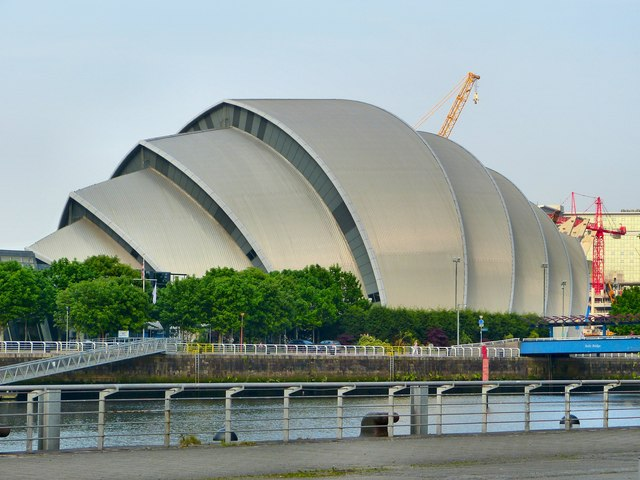
The design of the SEC Armadillo is inspired by Glasgow's shipbuilding history, with flat sheet material cladded to framed hulls

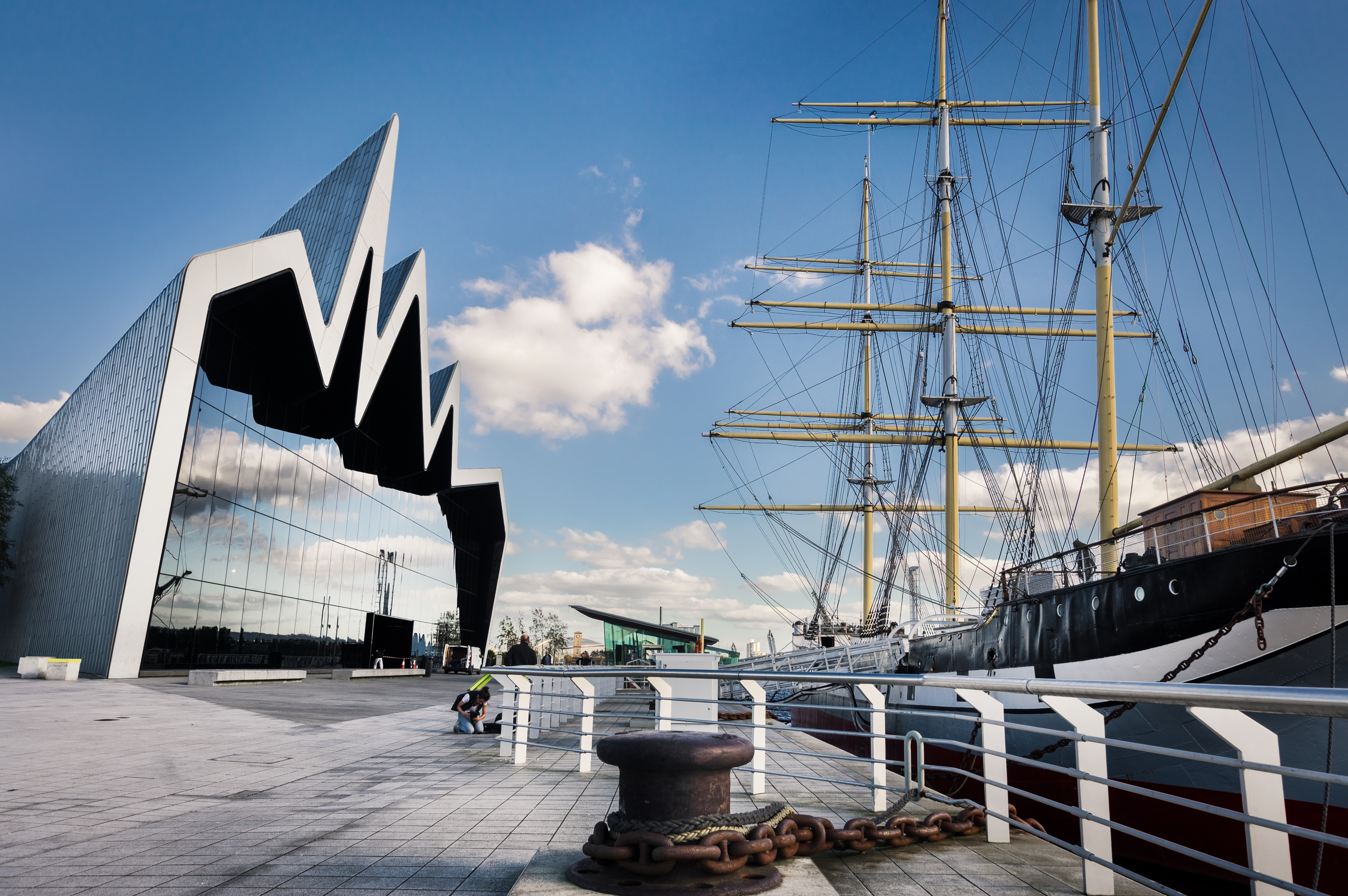
The Riverside Museum on the banks of the River Clyde

Very little of medieval Glasgow remains. The two main landmarks from this period are the 15th-century Provand's Lordship and 13th-century St. Mungo's Cathedral, although the original medieval street plan, along with many of the street names on the eastern side of the city centre has largely survived intact. Also in the 15th century began the building of Cathcart Castle, completed c. 1450 with a view over the landscape in all directions. It was at this castle Mary Queen of Scots supposedly spent the night before her defeat at the Battle of Langside in May 1568. The castle was demolished in 1980 for safety reasons.

The vast majority of the central city area as seen today dates from the 19th century. As a result, Glasgow has a heritage of Victorian architecture: the Glasgow City Chambers designed by William Young; the main building of the University of Glasgow, designed by Sir George Gilbert Scott; and the Kelvingrove Art Gallery and Museum, designed by Sir John W. Simpson, are notable examples.

The city is notable for architecture designed by the Glasgow School, the most notable exponent of that style being Charles Rennie Mackintosh. Mackintosh was an architect and designer in the Arts and Crafts Movement and the main exponent of Art Nouveau in the United Kingdom, designing numerous noted Glasgow buildings such as the Glasgow School of Art, Willow Tearooms and the Scotland Street School Museum. A hidden gem of Glasgow, also designed by Mackintosh, is the Queen's Cross Church, the only church by the renowned artist to be built.

Another architect who has had an enduring impact on the city's appearance is Alexander Thomson, with notable examples including the Holmwood House villa, and likewise Sir John James Burnet, awarded the R.I.B.A.'s Royal Gold Medal for his lifetime's service to architecture. The buildings reflect the wealth and self-confidence of the residents of the "Second City of the Empire". Glasgow generated immense wealth from trade and the industries that developed from the Industrial Revolution. The shipyards, marine engineering, steel making, and heavy industry all contributed to the growth of the city.

Many of the city's buildings were built with red or blond sandstone, but during the industrial era those colours disappeared under a pervasive black layer of soot and pollutants from the furnaces, until the Clean Air Act was introduced in 1956. There are more than 1,800 listed buildings in the city, of architectural and historical importance, and 23 Conservation Areas extending over 1,471 hectares (3,630 acres). Such areas include the Central Area, Dennistoun, the West End, Pollokshields – the first major planned garden suburb in Britain – Newlands and the village of Carmunnock.

Modern buildings in Glasgow include the Glasgow Royal Concert Hall, and along the banks of the Clyde are the Glasgow Science Centre, The OVO Hydro and the Scottish Exhibition and Conference Centre, whose Clyde Auditorium was designed by Sir Norman Foster, and is colloquially known as the "Armadillo". In 2004 Zaha Hadid won a competition to design the new Museum of Transport. Hadid's museum opened on the waterfront in 2011 and has been renamed the Riverside Museum to reflect the change in location and to celebrate Glasgow's rich industrial heritage stemming from the Clyde.

Glasgow's historical and modern architectural traditions were celebrated in 1999 when the city was designated UK City of Architecture and Design, winning the accolade over Liverpool and Edinburgh.

== Economy ==
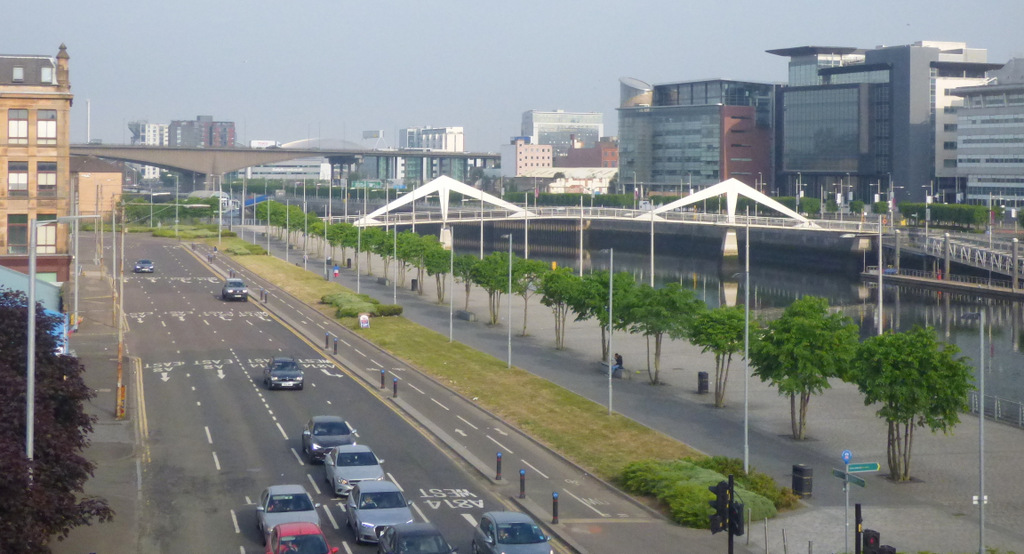
The International Financial Services District (IFSD), nicknamed "Wall Street on the Clyde", the 39th largest financial centre globally in 2012.

Glasgow has the largest economy in Scotland and is at the hub of the metropolitan area of West Central Scotland. Glasgow sustains more than 410,000 jobs in more than 12,000 companies. More than 153,000 jobs were created in Glasgow between 2000 and 2005 – a growth rate of 32%. Glasgow's annual economic growth rate of 4.4% is now second only to that of London. In 2005, more than 17,000 new jobs were created, and 2006 saw private-sector investment in the city reaching £4.2 billion, an increase of 22% in a single year. 55% of the residents in the Greater Glasgow area commute to the city every day.

Once dominant export orientated manufacturing industries such as passenger and cargo shipbuilding and other heavy engineering have been gradually replaced in importance by more diversified forms of economic activity. Major manufacturing firms continue to be headquartered in the city, such as Aggreko, Weir Group, Clyde Blowers, Howden, Linn Products, Firebrand Games, William Grant & Sons, Whyte and Mackay, The Edrington Group, British Polar Engines and Albion Motors. Naval shipbuilding and the defence industry continue to be significant, with companies such as BAE Systems, the Thales Group and others.

In 2023, major industries in the Glasgow City Region contributing to the economy of the city were public administration, education & health, distribution, hotels & restaurants, banking, finance and insurance services and transport and communication.

== Transport ==
=== Public transport ===
Glasgow has a large urban transport system, mostly managed by the Strathclyde Partnership for Transport (SPT). Glasgow has many bus services. Since bus deregulation almost all are provided by private operators, though SPT part-funds some services. The principal bus operators in Glasgow are: First Glasgow, McGill's Bus Services, Stagecoach South Scotland and West Coast Motors. The main bus terminal in Glasgow is Buchanan bus station.

Glasgow has the most extensive urban rail network in the UK outside London, with rail services travelling to a large part of the West of Scotland. Most lines were electrified under British Rail. All trains running within Scotland, including the local Glasgow trains, are operated by ScotRail, which is owned by the Scottish Government. Central station and Queen Street station are the two main railway terminals. Glasgow Central is the terminus of the 642 km (399 mi) long West Coast Main Line from London Euston, and TransPennine Express services from Manchester and CrossCountry services from Birmingham, Bristol, Plymouth and various other destinations in England.

Glasgow Central is also the terminus for suburban services on the south side of Glasgow, Ayrshire and Inverclyde, as well as being served by the cross city link from Dalmuir to Motherwell. Most other services within Scotland – the main line to Edinburgh, plus services to Aberdeen, Dundee, Inverness and the Western Highlands – operate from Queen Street station.

Glasgow's suburban network is almost completely divided by the River Clyde. There have been proposed initiatives such as Crossrail to better connect the suburban network. Glasgow is linked to Edinburgh by four direct railway links. In addition to the suburban rail network, SPT operates the Glasgow Subway. The Subway is the United Kingdom's only completely underground metro system and is the world's third oldest underground railway, after the London Underground and the Budapest Metro. Both railway and subway stations have a number of park and ride facilities.

As part of the wider regeneration along the banks of the River Clyde, a bus rapid transit system called Clyde Fastlink is operational between Glasgow City Centre to the Queen Elizabeth University Hospital.

Public transportation network in Glasgow
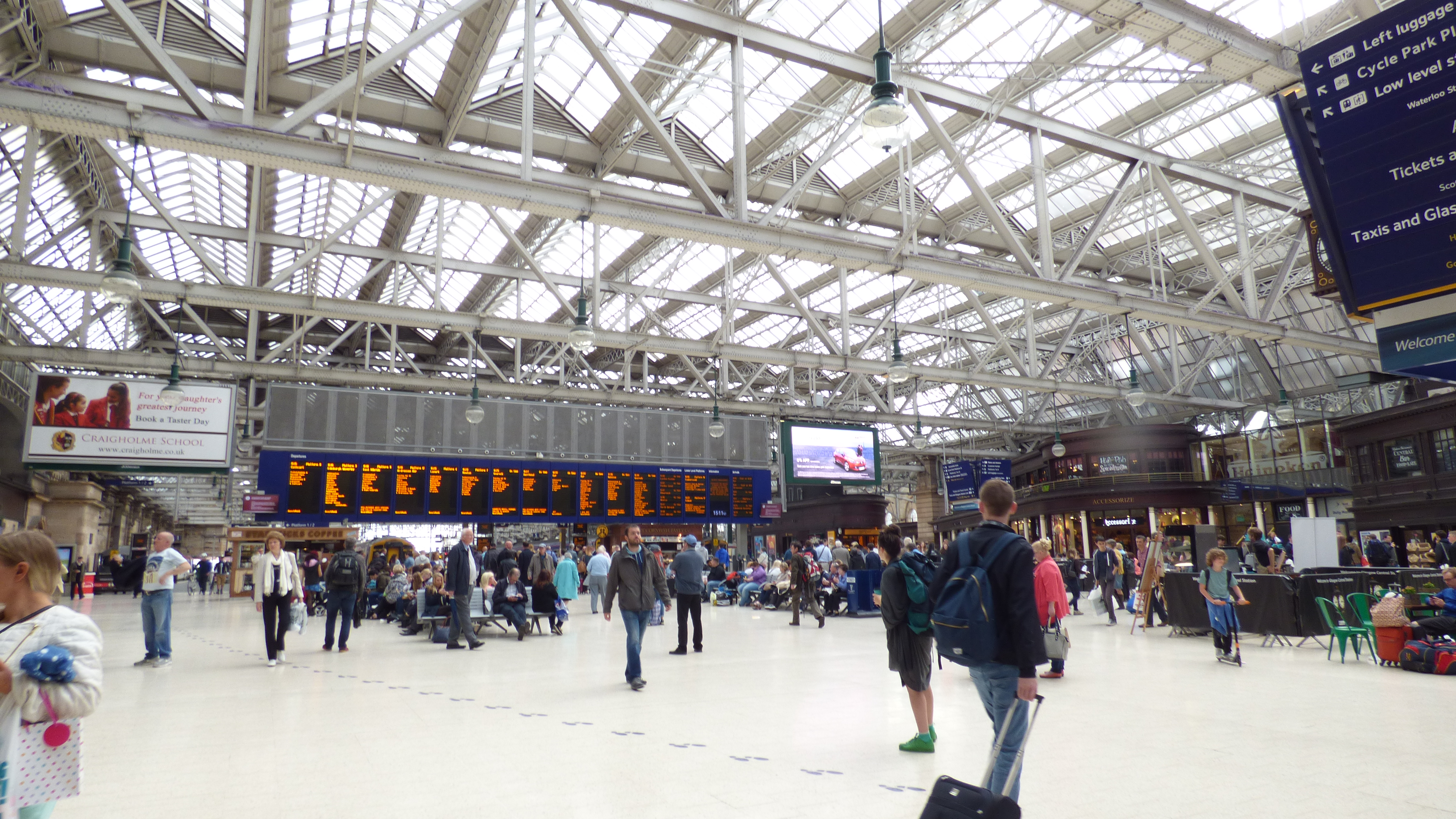
Glasgow Central railway station

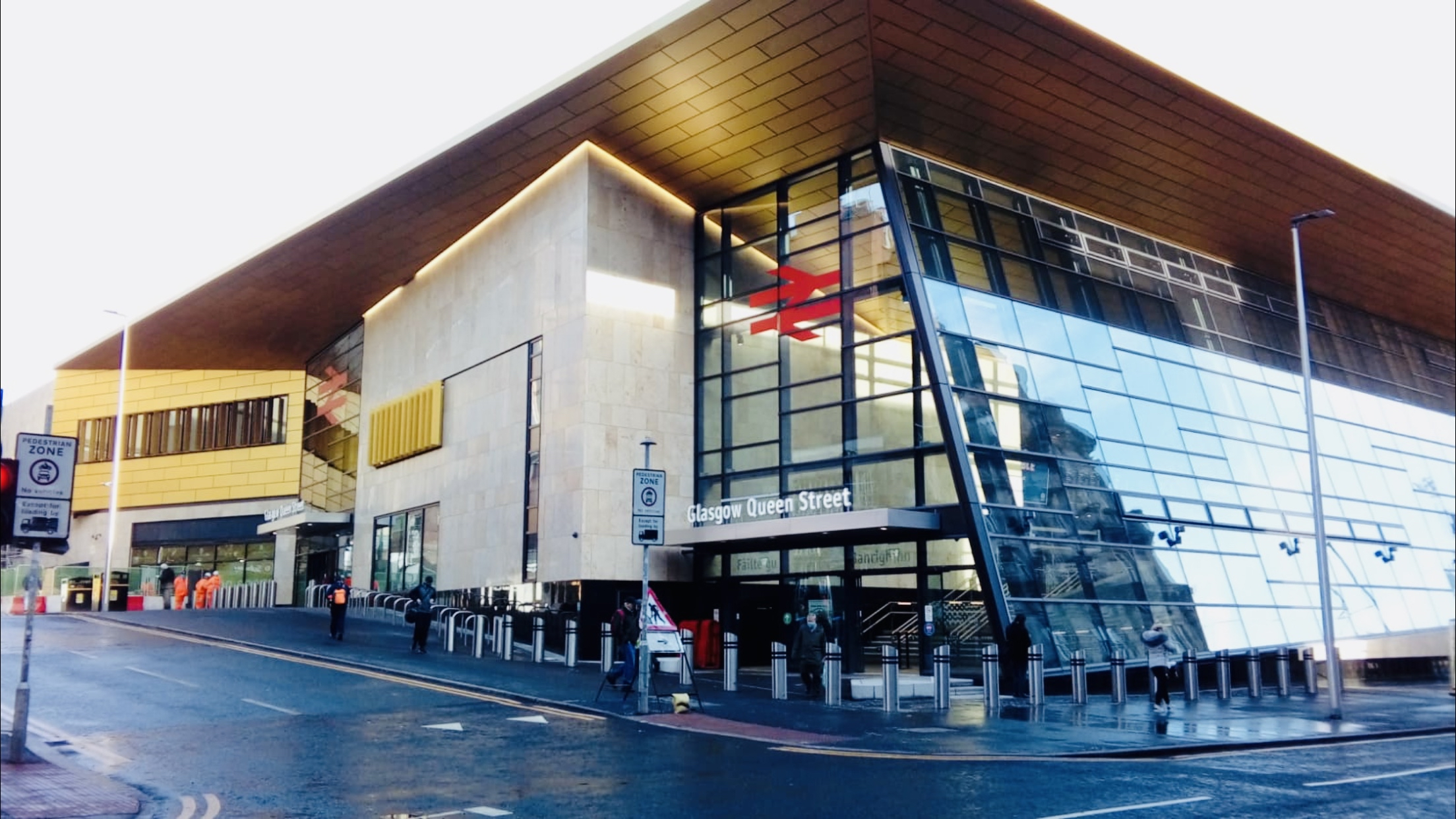
Queen Street railway station

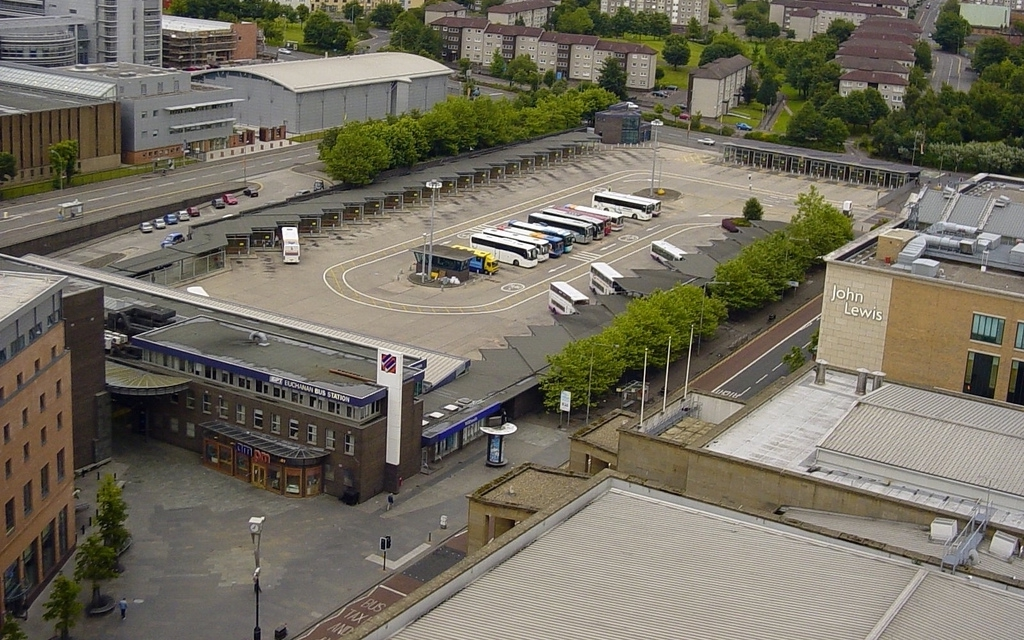
Buchanan Bus Station

Glasgow Subway is Scotland's only underground, and the third oldest network in the world

=== Roads ===
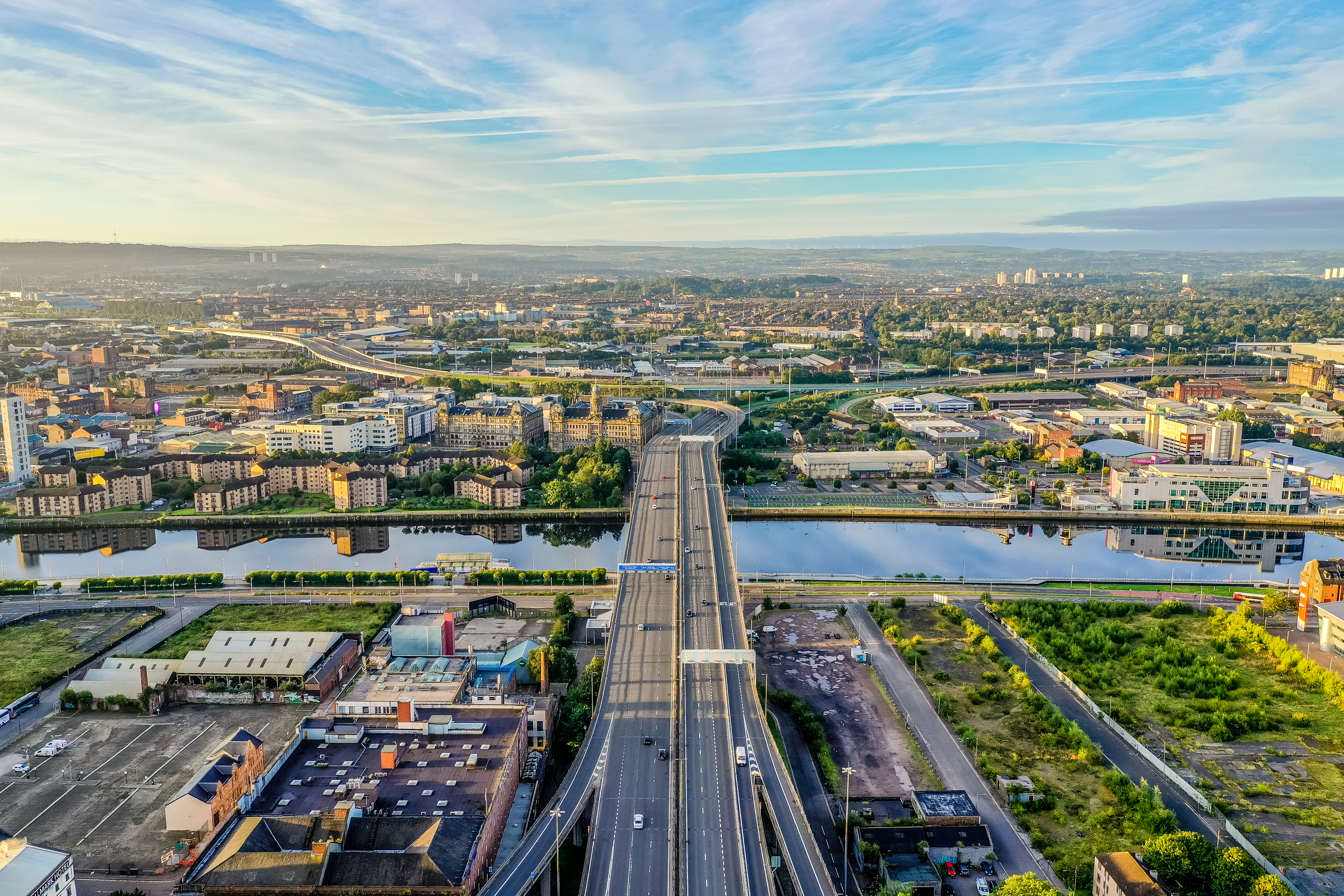
The M8, which crosses the Clyde over the Kingston Bridge, is Scotland's busiest motorway.

The main M8 motorway passes around the city centre and connects with the M77, M74, M73 and M80 motorways, all of which pass within Glasgow's boundaries. The A82 connects Glasgow to Argyll and the western Highlands. The M74 runs directly south towards Carlisle.

Other strategic roads in Glasgow include the East End Regeneration Route, which provides easier access to areas of the East End, linking the M8 to the extended M74.

=== Shipping ===
Global-ship-management is carried out by maritime and logistics firms in Glasgow, in client companies employing more than 100,000 seafarers. This reflects maritime skills over many decades and the training and education of deck officers and marine engineers from around the world at the City of Glasgow College, Riverside Campus, which produces over one third of all maritime graduates in the United Kingdom.

The main operational dock for bulk cargoes within Glasgow operated by Clydeport is the King George V Dock, near Braehead. This was the busiest and most important dock in the UK throughout WWII. Since the advent in the 1960s of containerisation, most other facilities, such as Greenock Container Terminal and Hunterston Terminal, are located in the deep waters of the Firth of Clyde, which together handle some 7.5 million tonnes of cargo each year. Longer distant commercial sea shipping from Glasgow occurs regularly to many European destinations, including Mediterranean and Baltic ports via passage through the Sea of the Hebrides.

Leisure and tourist sailing is important, at marinas and towns of the Clyde. PS Waverley, the world's last operational seagoing paddle-steamer is based on the Clyde.

=== Airports ===
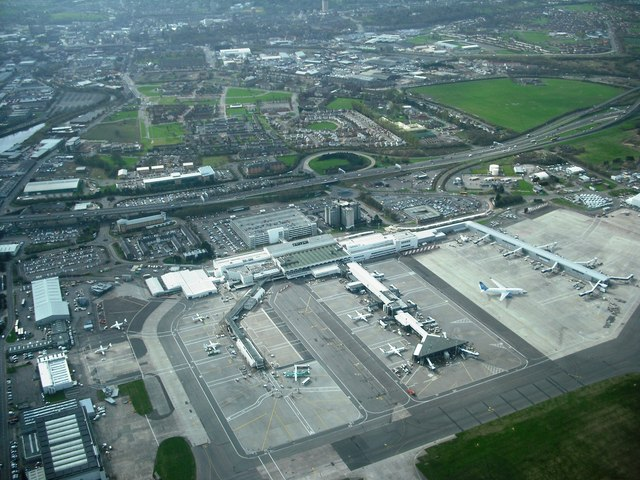
Glasgow Airport is the largest of the two airports that serve Glasgow

There are three international airports within 45 minutes travel of the city centre, and a centrally located seaplane terminal. Two airports are dedicated to Glasgow, and Edinburgh Airport, situated on the west side of Edinburgh, is not far from Glasgow. These airports are Glasgow Airport (GLA) (eight mi or thirteen km west of the city centre) in Renfrewshire, Glasgow Prestwick Airport (PIK) (30 mi or 50 km southwest) in South Ayrshire, Edinburgh Airport (EDI), (34 mi or 55 km east) in Edinburgh and Glasgow Seaplane Terminal, by the Glasgow Science Centre on the River Clyde.

There are several smaller, domestic and private airports around the city. There is a heliport, Glasgow City Heliport, located at Stobcross Quay on the banks of the Clyde.

All of the international airports are easily accessible by public transport. Glasgow Airport and Edinburgh Airport are directly linked by bus routes from the main bus station and a direct rail connection to Glasgow Prestwick Airport from Glasgow Central Station. A series of proposals to provide a direct rail link to Glasgow International Airport have ended unsuccessfully, beginning with the Glasgow Airport Rail Link in 2009. Subsequent proposals to improve public transport access to Glasgow Airport have been incorporated into the wider Clyde Metro project.

== Housing ==
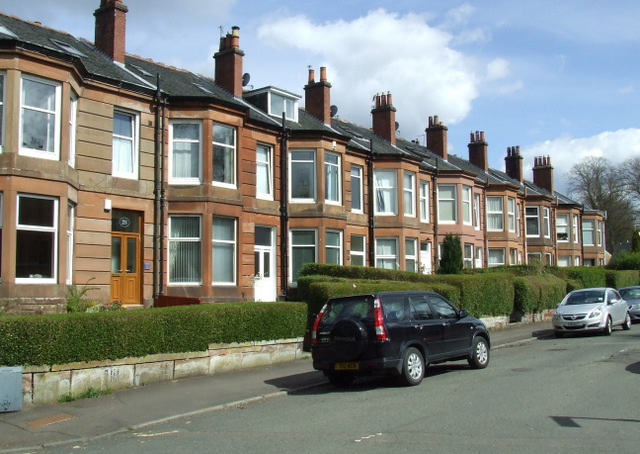
Typical red sandstone Glasgow terrace

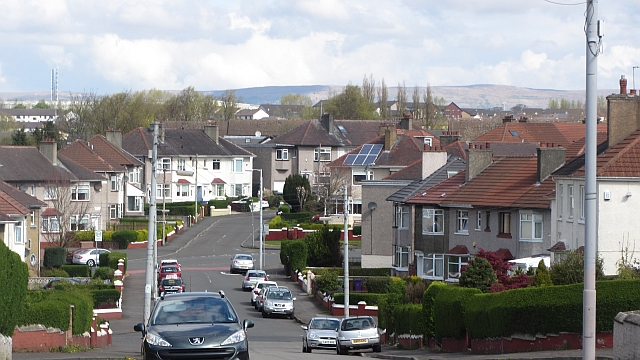
20th-century-style houses within the neighbourhood of Hillsborough Road

Glasgow is known for its tenements; the red and blond sandstone buildings are some of the most recognisable features of the city. These were the most popular form of housing in 19th- and 20th-century Glasgow, and remain the most common form of dwelling in Glasgow today. Tenements are commonly bought by a wide range of social types and are favoured for their large rooms, high ceilings and original period features. The Hyndland area of Glasgow became the first tenement conservation area in the UK and includes some tenement houses with as many as six bedrooms.

Like many cities in the UK, Glasgow witnessed the construction of high-rise housing in tower blocks in the 1960s, along with large overspill estates on the periphery of the city, in areas like Pollok, Nitshill, Castlemilk, Easterhouse, Milton and Drumchapel. These were built to replace the decaying inner-city tenement buildings originally built for workers who migrated from the surrounding countryside, the Highlands, and the rest of the United Kingdom, particularly Ireland, to feed the local demand for labour. The massive demand at that time outstripped the pace of new building, and many originally fine tenements often became overcrowded and unsanitary. Many degenerated into infamous slums, such as the Gorbals.

Efforts to improve this housing situation, most successfully with the City Improvement Trust in the late 19th century, cleared the slums of the old town areas such as the Trongate, High Street and Glasgow Cross. Subsequent urban renewal initiatives, such as those motivated by the Bruce Report, entailed the comprehensive demolition of slum tenement areas, the development of new towns on the periphery of the city, and the construction of tower blocks.

The policy of tenement demolition is now considered to have been short-sighted, wasteful and largely unsuccessful. Many of Glasgow's worst tenements were refurbished into desirable accommodation in the 1970s and 1980s and the policy of demolition is considered to have destroyed many fine examples of a "universally admired architectural" style. The Glasgow Housing Association took ownership of the housing stock from the city council on 7 March 2003, and has begun a £96 million clearance and demolition programme to clear and demolish many of the high-rise flats.

== Healthcare ==
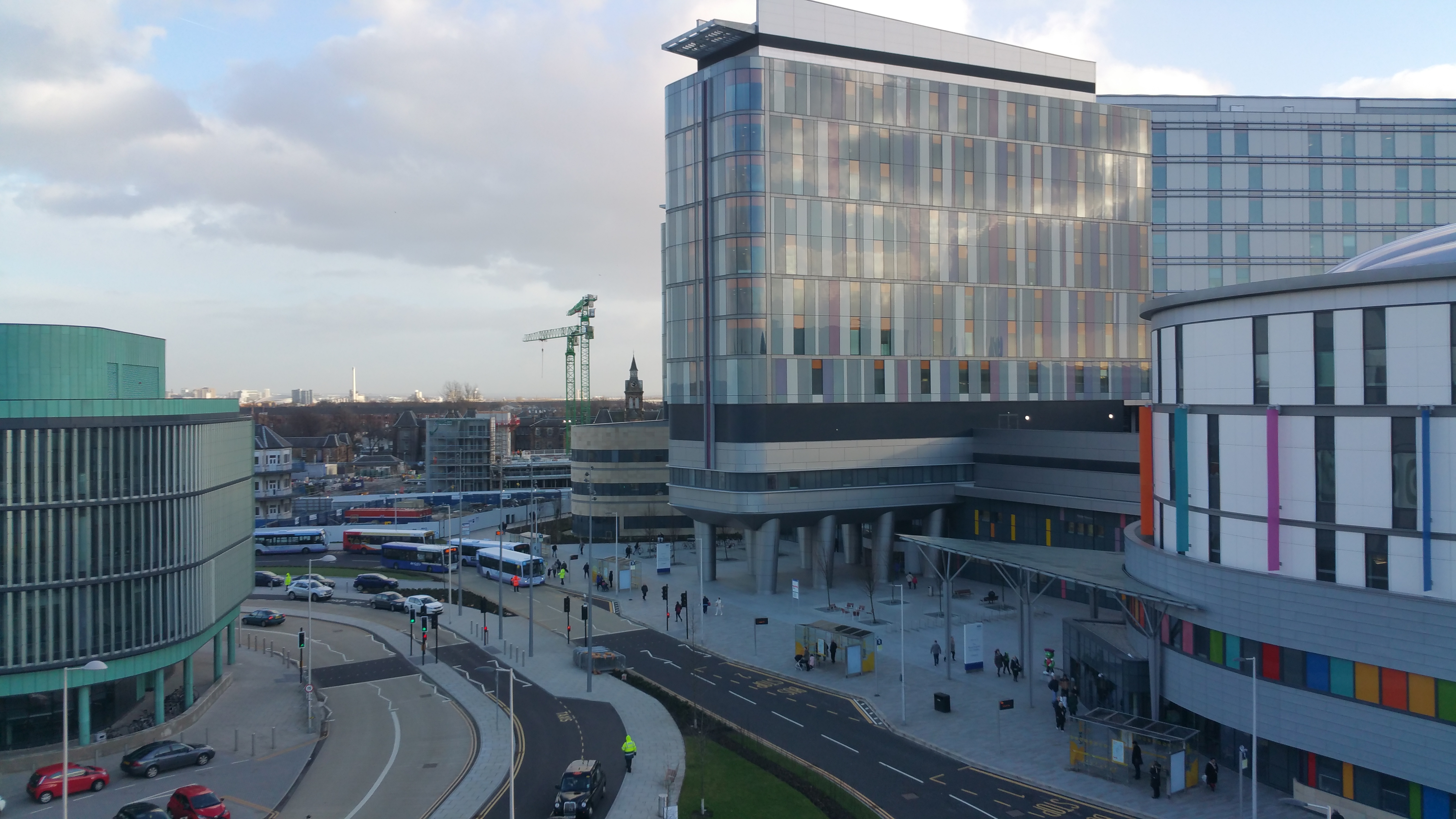
Queen Elizabeth University Hospital is the largest hospital campus in Europe.

Medical care in and around Glasgow is provided by NHS Scotland and is directly administered by NHS Greater Glasgow and Clyde. Major hospitals, including those with Accident & Emergency provision, are: the Gartnavel General Hospital, Glasgow Royal Infirmary and the Dental Hospital in the city Centre, Stobhill Hospital in the North and the Queen Elizabeth University Hospital in the South Side. Gartnavel Royal Hospital and The Priory are the two major psychiatric hospitals based in Glasgow.

The Queen Elizabeth University Hospital (QEUH) Campus is a 1,677-bed acute hospital located in Govan in the south-west of Glasgow. The hospital is built on the site of the former Southern General Hospital and opened at the end of April 2015. The hospital comprises a newly built 1,109-bed adult hospital, a 256-bed children's hospital and two major A&E departments, one for adults and one for children in addition to buildings retained from the former hospital. The QEUH is the Regional Major Trauma Centre for the west of Scotland and is also the largest hospital campus in Europe.

There is also an emergency telephone service provided by NHS 24 and 24-hour access to general practitioners through out-of-hours centres. Paramedic services are provided by the Scottish Ambulance Service and supported by voluntary bodies like the St. Andrew's Ambulance Association. A strong teaching tradition is maintained between the city's main hospitals and the University of Glasgow Medical School.

All pharmacies provide a wide range of services including minor ailment advice, emergency hormonal contraception and public health advice; some provide oxygen and needle exchange.

There are private clinics and hospitals at the Nuffield in the west end and Ross Hall in the south side of the city.

== Education ==
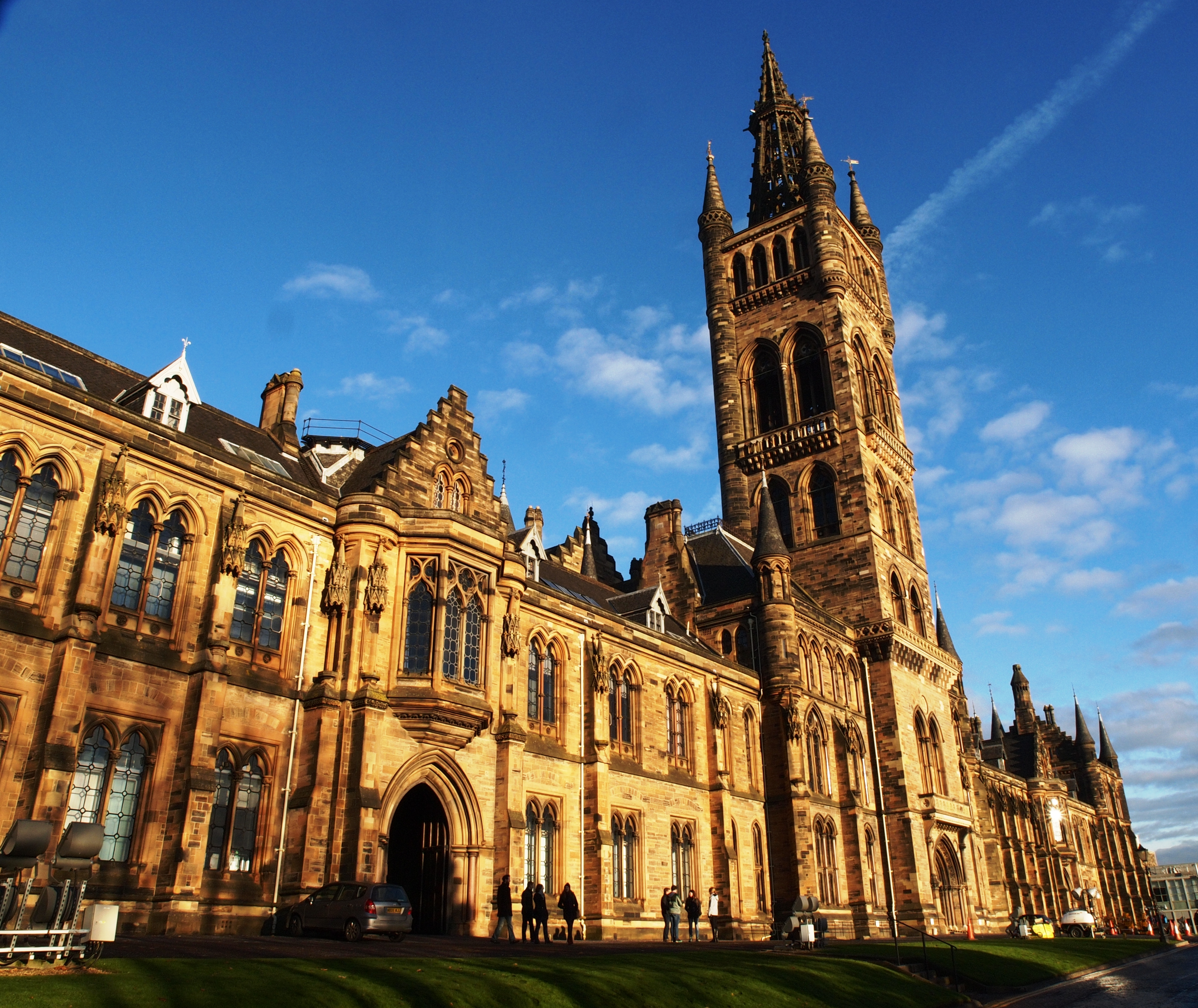
The University of Glasgow is the fourth-oldest university in the English-speaking world and among the world's top 100 universities.

Glasgow is a major centre of higher and academic research, with the following universities and colleges within 10 mi (16 km) of the city centre:

- University of Glasgow
- University of Strathclyde
- Glasgow Caledonian University
- University of the West of Scotland
- The Glasgow School of Art
- Royal Conservatoire of Scotland
- City of Glasgow College
- Glasgow Clyde College
- Glasgow Kelvin College
- West College Scotland

In 2011 Glasgow had 53,470 full-time students aged 18–74 resident in the city during term time, more than any other city in Scotland and the fifth-highest number in the United Kingdom outside London. The majority of those who live away from home reside in Shawlands, Dennistoun and the West End of the city.

The City Council operates 29 secondary schools, 149 primary schools and three specialist schools – the Dance School of Scotland, Glasgow School of Sport and the Glasgow Gaelic School (Sgoil Ghàidhlig Ghlaschu), the only secondary school in Scotland to teach exclusively in Gaelic. Outdoor Education facilities are provided by the city council at the Blairvadach Centre, near Helensburgh. Jordanhill School is operated directly by the Scottish Government. Glasgow also has a number of Independent schools, including The High School of Glasgow, founded in 1124 and the oldest school in Scotland; Hutchesons' Grammar School, founded in 1639 and one of the oldest school institutions in Scotland; and others such as Craigholme School (closed 2020), Glasgow Academy, Kelvinside Academy and St. Aloysius' College. Glasgow is part of the UNESCO Global Network of Learning Cities.

== Sport ==
=== Football ===
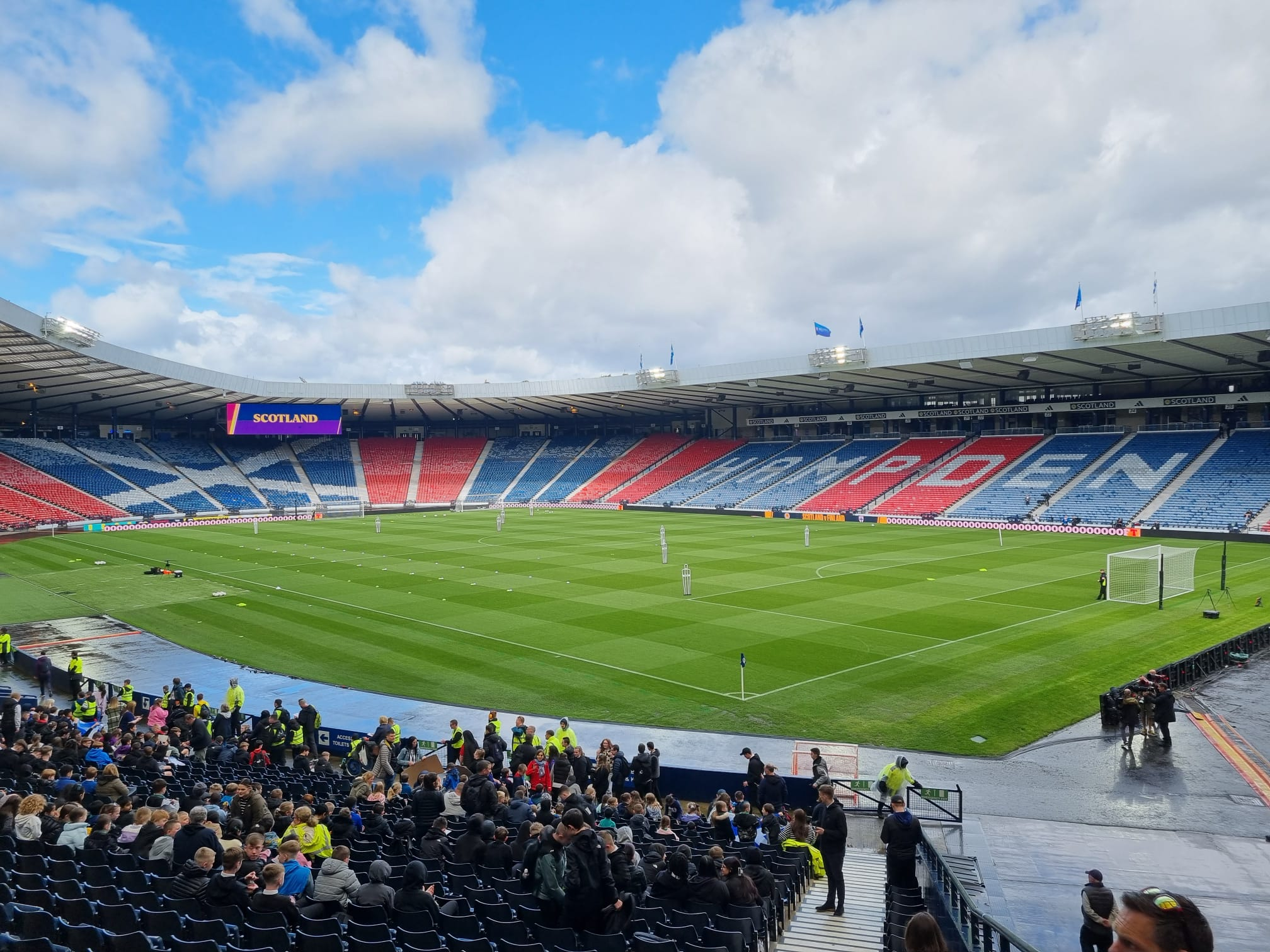
Glasgow is home to Hampden Park, home of the Scotland national football team.

The world's first international football match was held in 1872 at the West of Scotland Cricket Club's Hamilton Crescent ground in the Partick area of the city. The match, between Scotland and England finished 0–0. Glasgow was the first city (since joined by Liverpool in 1985, Madrid in 1986, 2014, 2016 and 2018, Milan in 1994 and London in 2019, 2025) to have had two football teams in European finals in the same season: in 1967, Celtic competed in and won the European Cup final, with rivals Rangers competing in the Cup Winners' Cup final. Rangers were the first football club from the United Kingdom to reach a European final, doing so in 1961. Celtic were the first non-Latin club to win the European Cup, under the management of Jock Stein in 1967, before Manchester United the following year. Celtic also went on to reach another European Cup Final in 1970, losing to Feyenoord, and also the final of the UEFA Cup in 2003, where they lost an enthralling match which finished 3–2 to Portuguese club Porto. Rangers also reached the final of the same competition in 2008 and 2022, where they lost to Zenit Saint Petersburg of Russia, and Eintracht Frankfurt of Germany.

Hampden Park, which is Scotland's national football stadium, holds the European record for attendance at a football match: 149,547 saw Scotland beat England 3–1 in 1937, in the days before leading British stadia became all-seated. Hampden Park has hosted the final of the UEFA Champions League on three occasions, most recently in 2002 and hosted the UEFA Cup Final in 2007. Celtic Park (60,411 seats) is located in the east end of Glasgow, and Ibrox Stadium (51,700 seats) on the south side.

Glasgow has four professional football clubs, who all play in the SPFL: Celtic, Rangers, Partick Thistle, and Queen's Park (after their move from amateur status in November 2019). Prior to this, Glasgow had two other professional teams: Clyde (now playing in Hamilton) and Third Lanark (liquidated in 1967), plus four others active in the league in the 19th century: Thistle, Cowlairs, Northern and Linthouse. There are a number of West of Scotland Football League clubs within the city as well, such as Pollok, Maryhill, Benburb, Ashfield, Glasgow Perthshire F.C., Glasgow United (formerly Shettleston Juniors), and Petershill, plus numerous amateur teams.

The history of football in the city, as well as the status of the Old Firm, attracts many visitors to football matches in the city throughout the season. The Scottish Football Association, the national governing body, and the Scottish Football Museum are based in Glasgow, as are the Scottish Professional Football League, Scottish Junior Football Association and Scottish Amateur Football Association. The Glasgow Cup was a once popular tournament, which was competed for by Rangers, Celtic, Clyde, Partick Thistle and Queen's Park. The competition is now played for by the youth sides of the five teams.

Glasgow is also home to six women's football teams. Currently, Glasgow City are the champions of the Scottish Women's Premier League. Other local teams include Glasgow Girls and the women's sections of the men's clubs: Celtic and Rangers play in the top division.

Club	Founded	League	Venue	Capacity
Queen's Park F.C.	1867	Scottish Championship	Hampden Park	3,746
Rangers F.C.	1872	Scottish Premiership	Ibrox Stadium	51,700
Partick Thistle F.C.	1876	Scottish Championship	Firhill Stadium	10,102
Celtic F.C.	1888	Scottish Premiership	Celtic Park	60,411

=== Rugby union ===
Glasgow has a professional rugby union club, the Glasgow Warriors, which plays in the European Rugby Champions Cup and United Rugby Championship alongside teams from Scotland, Ireland, Wales, Italy and South Africa. The Warriors current home is Scotstoun Stadium and has been since 2012, previously they played at Firhill Stadium. They have won the Melrose 7s in both 2014 and 2015 and were also crowned champions of the Pro12 (later rebranded as the United Rugby Championship) at the end of the 2014/15 season after beating Irish side Munster in Belfast. Warriors won URC in the 2023/24 season after defeating South African team Bulls in the Grand Final in Pretoria.

In the Scottish League, Glasgow Hawks RFC was formed in 1997 by the merger of two of Glasgow's oldest clubs: Glasgow Academicals and Glasgow High Kelvinside (GHK). Despite the merger, the second division teams of Glasgow Academicals and Glasgow High Kelvinside re-entered the Scottish rugby league in 1998. Another of the Glasgow area's most prominent clubs Glasgow Hutchesons Aloysians RFC (GHA) has its roots in the south of the city (nowadays technically they are based just outside the city in the suburb of Giffnock in East Renfrewshire). GHA was formed in 2002 with the merger of two of Glasgow's leading clubs at the time, Glasgow Southern RFC and Hutchesons Aloysians RFC.

Cartha Queen's Park play at Dumbreck, within the city. Glasgow was also home to one of the oldest rugby clubs in the country, West of Scotland F.C., which was formed in 1865 and was a founding member of the Scottish Rugby Union. The club was originally based in Partick at Hamilton Crescent but is now based outside the city, at Milngavie in East Dunbartonshire.

=== Other sports ===
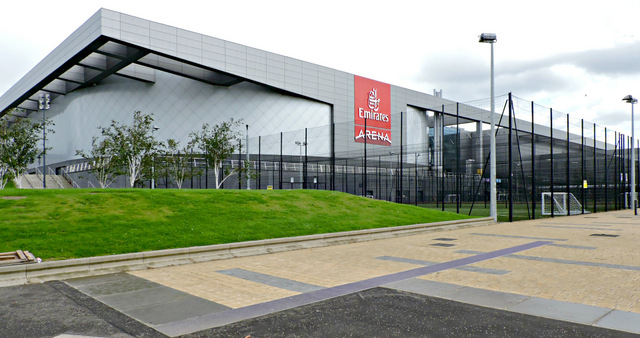
Glasgow International Arena, formerly the Emirates Arena, built for the 2014 Commonwealth Games and used again in 2026

The Easterhouse Panthers based in the East End of Glasgow are a rugby league team who play in the Rugby League Conference Scotland Division. From 1966 to 1986, the Glasgow Dynamos played at Crossmyloof Ice Rink. Since October 2010 a team called the Glasgow Clan based in the nearby Braehead Arena in Renfrewshire has played in the professional Elite Ice Hockey League alongside two other Scottish teams, the Fife Flyers and the Dundee Stars.

The Arlington Baths Club was founded in 1870. It is situated in the Woodlands area of the city and is still in use today. It is believed the club's first Baths Master William Wilson invented water polo at the club. The Arlington inspired other Swimming Clubs and the Western Baths, which opened in 1876, is also still in existence in nearby Hillhead.

Glasgow hosts Scotland's only professional basketball team, the Caledonia Gladiators, who compete in the British Basketball League. Previously based in Renfrewshire's Braehead Arena and the 1,200-seat Kelvin Hall, the team has been based at the Emirates Arena since the 2012/13 season. Major international sporting arenas include the Kelvin Hall and Scotstoun Sports Centre. In 2003 the National Academy for Badminton was completed in Scotstoun. In 2003, Glasgow was also given the title of European Capital of Sport.

Glasgow is also host to many cricket clubs including Clydesdale Cricket Club who have been title winners for the Scottish Cup many times. This club also acted as a neutral venue for a One Day International match between India and Pakistan in 2007, but due to bad weather it was called off. Smaller sporting facilities include an abundance of outdoor playing fields, as well as golf clubs such as Haggs Castle and artificial ski slopes. Between 1998 and 2004, the Scottish Claymores American football team played some or all of their home games each season at Hampden Park and the venue also hosted World Bowl XI. Glasgow Green and the Gorbals are home to a number of rowing clubs, some with open membership the rest belonging to universities or schools. Historically, rowing races on the River Clyde here attracted huge crowds of spectators to watch regattas in the late 19th century and early 20th century; before football caught the public imagination. Two of Glasgow's rowing clubs separately claim that it was their members who were among the founders of Rangers Football Club.

Motorcycle speedway racing was first introduced to Glasgow in 1928 and is currently staged at Ashfield Stadium in the North of the city. The home club, Glasgow Tigers, compete in the SGB Championship, the second tier of motorcycle speedway in Britain. Glasgow is also one of five places in Scotland that hosts the final of the Scottish Cup of Shinty, better known as the Camanachd Cup. This is usually held at Old Anniesland. Once home to numerous Shinty clubs, there is now only one senior club in Glasgow, Glasgow Mid-Argyll.

=== Sporting events host city ===
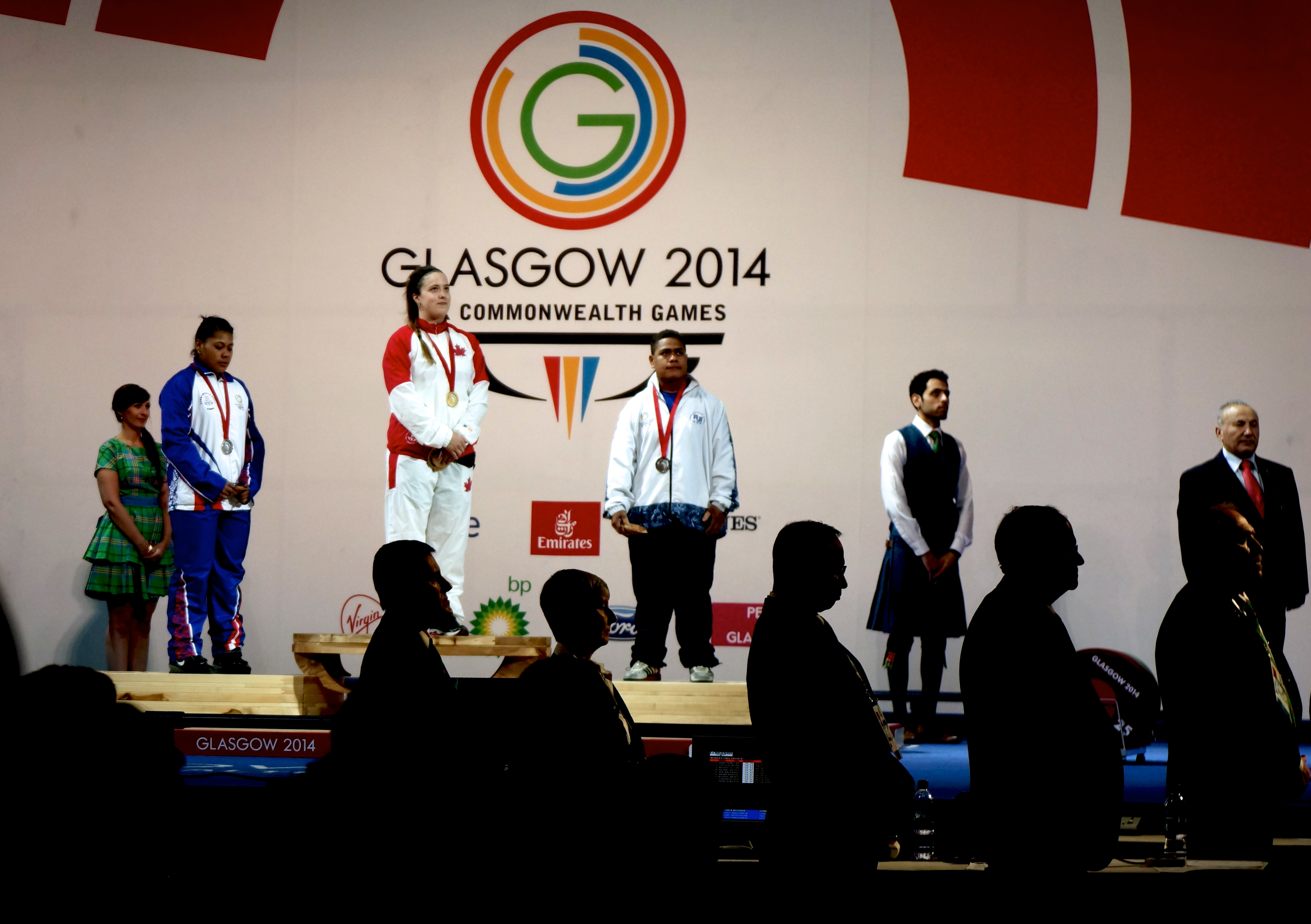
Athletes during the 2014 Commonwealth Games hosted by Glasgow

Glasgow bid to host the 2018 Summer Youth Olympics but lost to Buenos Aires in the 4 July 2013 vote. Glasgow was the host of the 2018 European Sports Championships along with Berlin (hosts of the 2018 European Athletics Championships). In August 2023, the city hosted the inaugural UCI Cycling World Championships. Glasgow played host to five venues for the event, whilst some events were held in Dumfries & Galloway (para-cycling road) and Stirling (time trial).

On 9 November 2007, Glasgow was selected to be the host city of the 2014 Commonwealth Games. The games were held at a number of existing and newly constructed sporting venues across the city, including a refurbished Hampden Park, Kelvingrove Park, Kelvin Hall, and the OVO Hydro at the SECC. The opening ceremony was held at Celtic Park. 2014 was the third time the Games have been held in Scotland. On 17 September 2024, Glasgow was chosen as host for the 2026 Commonwealth Games, marking the second time Glasgow hosts the event. Glasgow replaced Victoria (the original host) which pulled out due to unexpected cost increases. The Games took place from 23 July to 2 August 2026, with 2,749 athletes representing 74 nations and territories competing in 215 medal events across ten sports, including 47 para-sport events. The event was smaller in scale than the 2014 Games and made use of four existing venues: Scotstoun Stadium, Tollcross International Swimming Centre, the Glasgow International Arena and the Scottish Event Campus.

Glasgow was the Scottish host city for the pan–European UEFA Euro 2020 tournament, with the group of 16 matches being played at the city's Hampden Park. In 2023, Scotland, along with England, Northern Ireland, Republic of Ireland and Wales, were confirmed hosts for the UEFA Euro 2028 tournament, again with Hampden Stadium being the selected Scottish stadium to host matches.

== Major incidents and tragedies ==
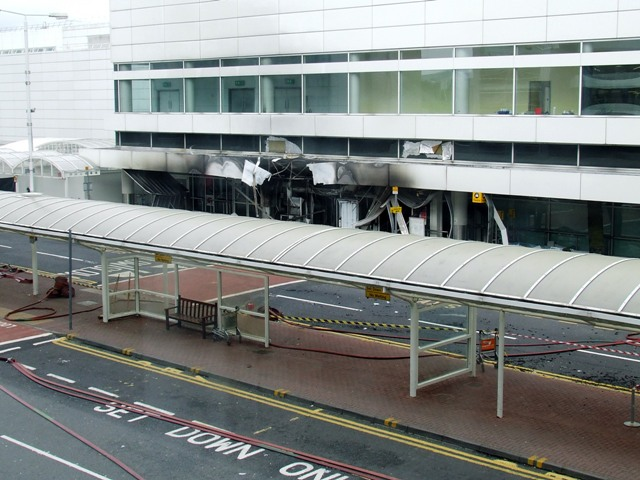
The aftermath of the 2007 Glasgow Airport attack, the first terrorist attack to take place in Scotland since the bombing of Pan Am Flight 103 over Lockerbie in 1988

- 1872 – Tradeston Flour Mills explosion – 18 died when grain dust was ignited.
- 1883 – SS Daphne (1883) – 124 people died when the ship sank after its launching.
- 5 April 1902 – 1902 Ibrox disaster – 25 spectators died and more than 500 were injured when a new wooden stand at the Ibrox Park stadium collapsed during an England–Scotland match.
- 1903 – Glasgow St Enoch rail accident – 16 were killed in the accident.
- 1928 – Glasgow Queen Street rail accident – Three passengers were killed.
- 1941 – During World War II, the Luftwaffe conducted the Clydebank Blitz. The air raids largely destroyed Clydebank, where 528 people were killed; about 1,200 died across Clydeside as a whole, some 650 of them in Glasgow itself.
- 1960s/1970s – Many perished at three major blazes: the Cheapside Street whisky bond fire in Cheapside Street, Anderston (1960, 19 killed); the James Watt Street fire (1968, 22 killed); and the Kilbirnie Street fire (1972, seven killed).
- 2 January 1971 – 1971 Ibrox disaster – 66 people were killed in a crush, as supporters attempted to vacate the stadium.
- 21 October 1971 – Clarkston explosion – 22 people died in a gas explosion.
- 1984 – Six people died in a murder by arson during the Glasgow ice cream wars.
- 1989 – Glasgow Bellgrove rail accident – Two were killed.
- 11 May 2004 – Stockline Plastics factory explosion – The ICL Plastics factory (commonly referred to as Stockline Plastics factory), in the Woodside district of Glasgow, exploded. Nine people were killed, including two company directors, and 33 injured – 15 seriously. The four-storey building was largely destroyed.
- 30 June 2007 – 2007 Glasgow International Airport attack – Two jihadist terrorists – Bilal Abdullah and Kafeel Ahmed – deliberately drove a Jeep Cherokee SUV loaded with propane cylinders into the glass doors of a crowded terminal at Glasgow International Airport in an attempted suicide attack. A concrete security pillar blocked the car from entering the terminal. The two perpetrators were both apprehended; Ahmed died of burn wounds sustained in the attack, while Abdullah was convicted in Woolwich Crown Court of conspiracy to murder through terrorism and was sentenced to at least 32 years' imprisonment. The perpetrators were also linked to a failed car bombing in London the previous day. Ahmed's brother Sabeel Ahmed pleaded guilty to failing to disclose information about an act of terrorism and was deported.
- 29 November 2013 – 2013 Glasgow helicopter crash – A Eurocopter EC135-T2+ police helicopter (operated by Bond Air Services for Police Scotland) crashed on top of The Clutha Vaults Bar in Glasgow City Centre, killing all aboard the helicopter (the pilot and two crew members) and seven people in the pub. The cause of the crash was fuel starvation due to pilot error.
- 23 May 2014 – Glasgow School of Art blaze – A fire tore through the historic and world-renowned Glasgow School of Art Mackintosh building, that was designed by Charles Rennie Mackintosh. Around a tenth of the structure and 30% of its contents were destroyed, including the prized Mackintosh Library. There were no deaths but a few were treated for minor smoke inhalation. The Scottish Fire and Rescue were praised for their quick response and plan to effectively tackle the fire. It was later found after a fire investigation that gases inside a projector had overheated and ignited.
- 22 December 2014 – 2014 Glasgow bin lorry crash – Six people were killed and many were seriously injured when a bin lorry careened out of control and collided with pedestrians, vehicles, and buildings, on Queen Street, Glasgow, before crashing into the Millennium Hotel. The subsequent fatal accident inquiry established that the driver had suffered a "neurocardiogenic syncope" (fainting) episode that caused him to lose control of his vehicle.
- 29 December 2014 – first Ebola virus case in Scotland – Pauline Cafferkey, a nurse returning to Glasgow from Kerry Town treatment centre, Sierra Leone, West Africa where she had been a volunteer caring for patients infected with the Ebola virus was taken into isolation after testing positive for the virus. She was not diagnosed before leaving Sierra Leone.
- 15 June 2018 – A fire once again broke out in the partially restored Glasgow School of Art, causing extensive damage. The school was widely criticised for failing to install an effective modern sprinkler system in a timely manner. Emergency services received the first call at 11:19 pm BST, and 120 firefighters and 20 fire engines were dispatched to the fire. No casualties were reported. The cause of the fire remains unknown.
- 8 March 2026 – Union Street fire – A fire broke out on Union Street, originating from a vape shop, causing damage to buildings. The fire was said to have started at 4PM GMT. Roughly 60 firefighters and 15 fire engines were at the location. There are no reported casualties.

== Namesake area on Mars ==
There is an area on the planet Mars which NASA has named Glasgow, after Scotland's largest city. The Mars rover Curiosity, which landed on the planet in August 2012, has drilled at the site.

== Twin towns – sister cities ==
Glasgow is twinned with:

- Nuremberg, Germany (since 1985)
- Dalian, China (since 1997)
- Havana, Cuba (since 2002)
- Turin, Italy (since 2003)
- Marseille, France (since 2006)
- Lahore, Pakistan (since 2006)
- Bethlehem, Palestine (since 2007)
- Mykolaiv, Ukraine (since 2024)

From 1986 to 2022, Glasgow was also twinned with Rostov-on-Don, Russia, however the agreement was suspended after Russia's attacks on Ukraine.

=== Partnerships ===
The city is also in a partnership with:

- Berlin, Germany (since 2020)
- Oulu, Finland
- Pittsburgh, United States (since 2020)
- Santiago, Chile (since 2020)

== See also ==
- Outline of Glasgow
