= Glasgow city centre =

Central business district of Glasgow, Scotland

Coordinates: 55.86279°N 4.25424°W

Glasgow city centre is the central business district of Glasgow, Scotland. It is bordered by the Saltmarket, High Street and Castle Street to the east, the River Clyde to the south, and the M8 motorway to the west and north. It is made up of the areas of Cowcaddens, Blythswood Hill, and Merchant City, though parts of Garnethill, Townhead, and Anderston also fall within its boundaries.

== Retail and theatre district ==
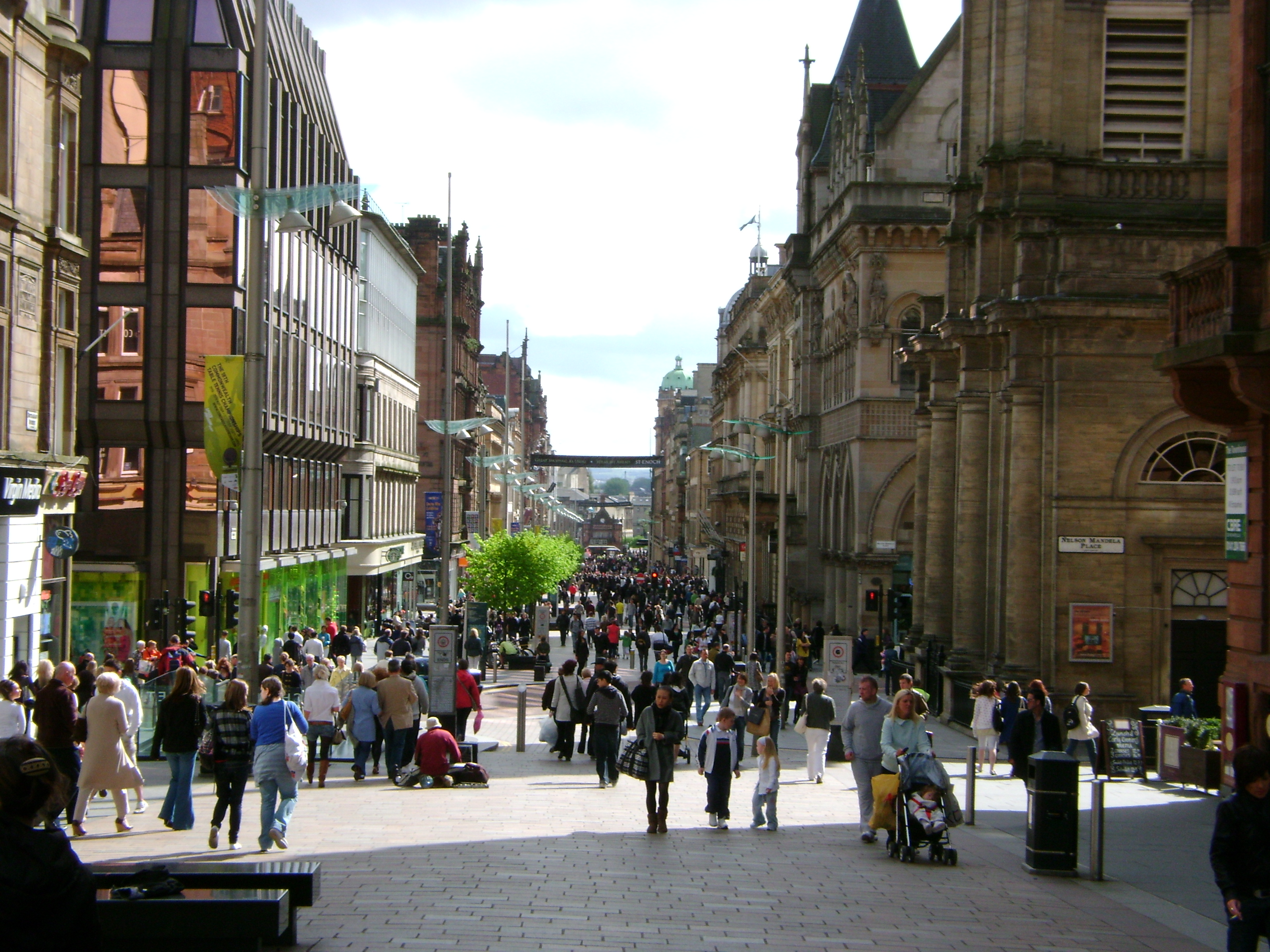
Looking down Buchanan Street towards St Enoch subway station

The city centre is based on a grid system of streets, similar to that of Barcelona or American cities, on the north bank of the River Clyde. The heart of the city is George Square, site of many of Glasgow's public statues and the elaborate Victorian Glasgow City Chambers, headquarters of Glasgow City Council. To the south and west are the shopping precincts of Argyle Street, Sauchiehall Street and Buchanan Street, the latter featuring more upmarket retailers and winner of the Academy of Urbanism 'Great Street Award' 2008. The main shopping centres are Buchanan Galleries and the St. Enoch Centre, with the up-market Princes Square and the Italian Centre specialising in designer labels. Glasgow is generally recognised as the United Kingdom's second largest and most economically important retail sector after Central London.

The city centre is home to most of Glasgow's main cultural venues: The Theatre Royal (home of Scottish Opera and formerly Scottish Ballet which now resides in The Tramway Theatre), The Pavilion, The King's Theatre, Glasgow Royal Concert Hall, Glasgow Film Theatre, Gallery of Modern Art (GoMA), Mitchell Library, the Centre for Contemporary Arts, McLellan Galleries and The Lighthouse Museum of Architecture, Design and the City. The world's tallest cinema, the eighteen-screen Cineworld, is situated on Renfrew Street. The city centre is also home to four of Glasgow's higher education institutions: The University of Strathclyde, The Royal Conservatoire of Scotland, Glasgow School of Art and Glasgow Caledonian University.

== Merchant City ==
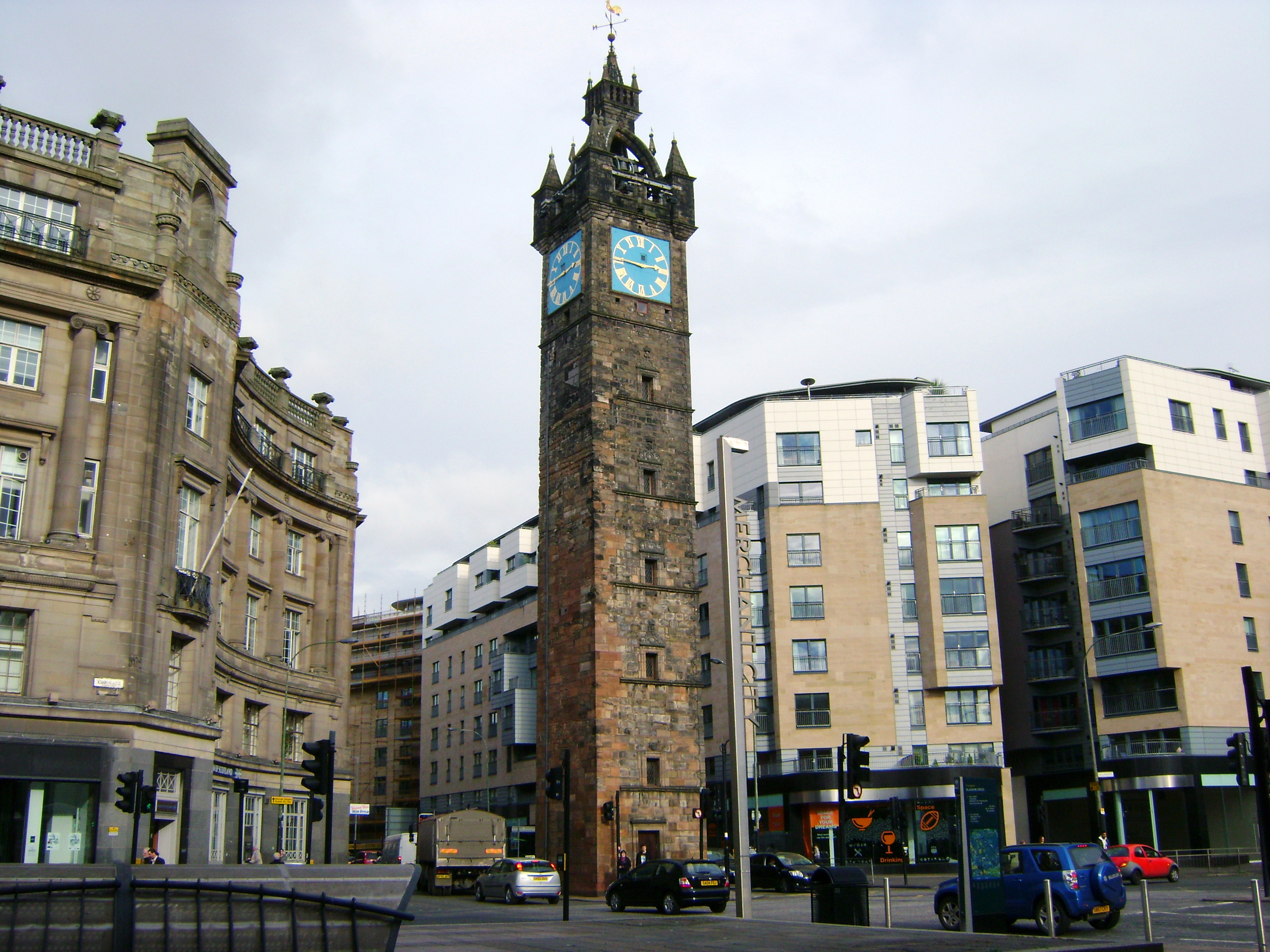
The Tolbooth Steeple dominates Glasgow Cross and marks the east side of the Merchant City.

To the east is the commercial and residential district of Merchant City. The Merchant City was formerly the residential district of the wealthy city merchants in the 18th and early 19th centuries, particularly the Tobacco Lords from whom many of the streets take their name. As the Industrial Revolution and the wealth it brought to the city resulted in the expansion of Glasgow's central area westward, the original medieval centre was left behind. Glasgow Cross, situated at the junction of High Street, Gallowgate, Trongate and Saltmarket was the original centre of the city, symbolised by its Mercat cross. Glasgow Cross encompasses the Tolbooth Clock Tower; all that remains of the original City Chambers, which was destroyed by fire in 1926. Moving northward up High Street towards Rottenrow and Townhead lies the 15th century Glasgow Cathedral and the Provand's Lordship. Due to growing industrial pollution levels in the mid to late 19th century, the area fell out of favour with residents.

From the late 1980s onwards, the Merchant City has been rejuvenated with luxury city centre apartments and warehouse conversions. This regeneration has supported an increasing number of cafés and restaurants. The area is also home to a number of high end boutique style shops and some of Glasgow's most upmarket stores.

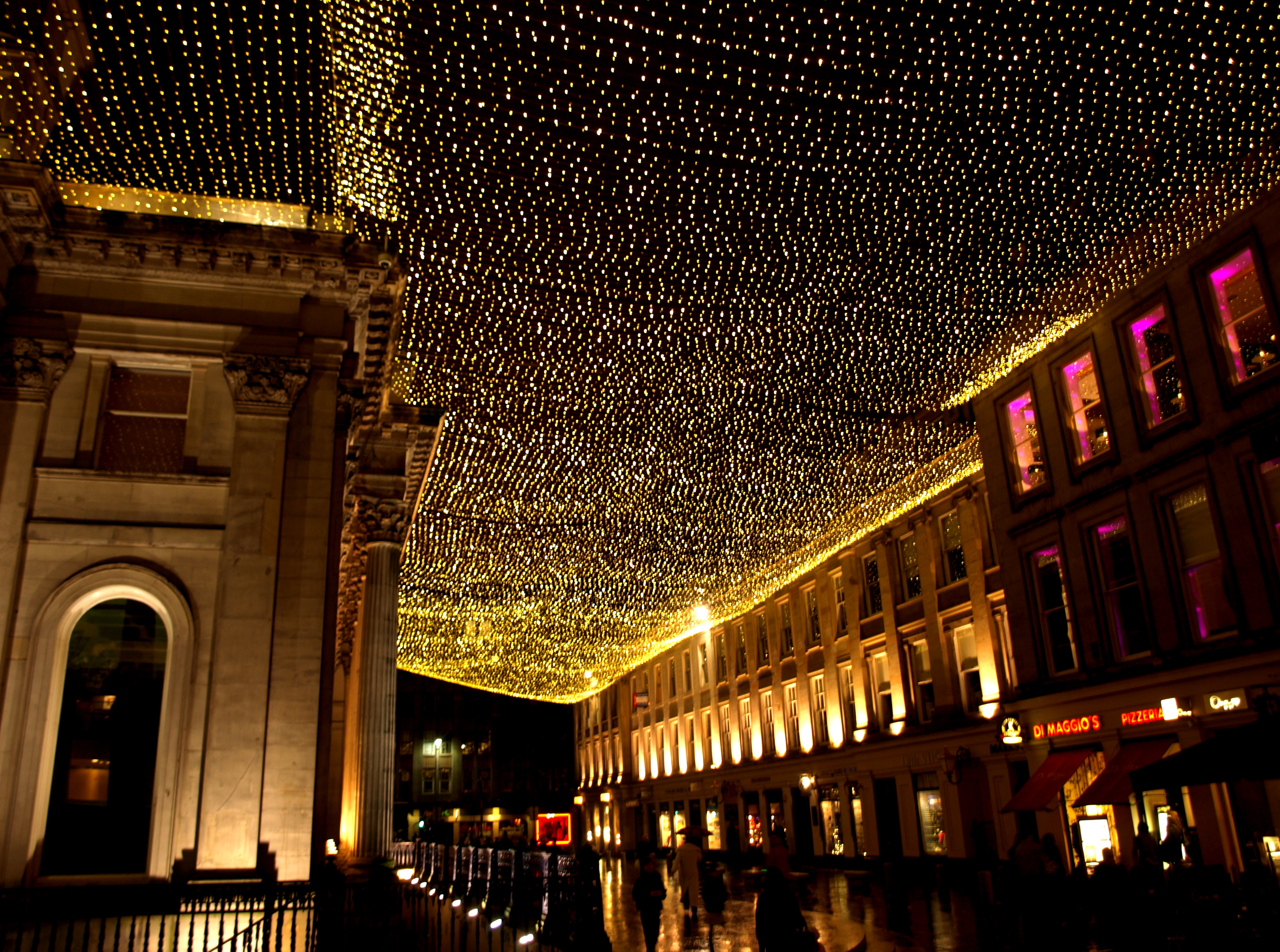
Royal Exchange Square at night (Merchant City)

The Merchant City is the centre of Glasgow's growing 'cultural quarter', based on King Street, the Saltmarket and Trongate, and at the heart of the annual Merchant City Festival. The area has supported a huge growth in art galleries, the origins of which can be found in the late 80s when it attracted artist-led organisations that could afford the cheap rents required to operate in vacant manufacturing or retail spaces. The artistic and cultural potential of the Merchant City as a 'cultural quarter' was harnessed by independent arts organisations and Glasgow City Council, and the recent development of Trongate 103, which houses galleries, workshops, artist studios and production spaces, is considered a major outcome of the continued partnership between both. The area also contains a number of theatres and concert venues, including the Tron Theatre, the Old Fruitmarket, the Trades Hall, St Andrew's in the Square, Merchant Square, and the City Halls.

A large part of Glasgow's LGBT scene is located within the Merchant City. This includes many clubs, along with a couple of saunas. Recently the city council defined (and perhaps expanded) the area known as Merchant City as far west as Buchanan Street, marking these boundaries with new, highly stylised metal signage.

== Financial district ==
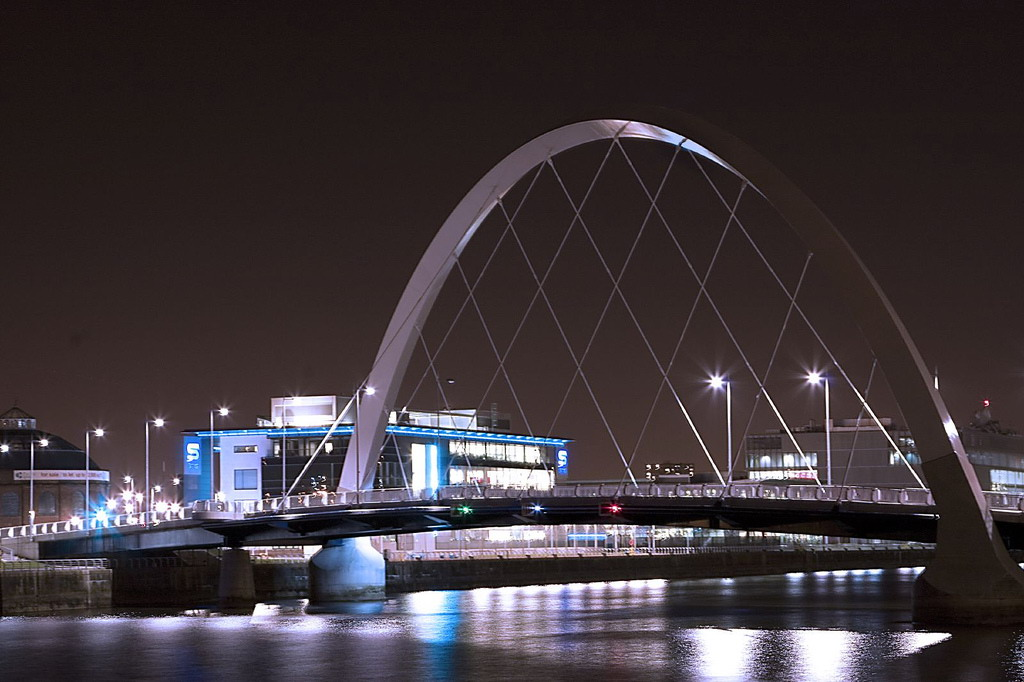
Clyde Arc, also known as "Squinty Bridge"

To the western edge of the city centre, occupying the areas of Blythswood Holm and the southern edges of Blythswood Hill, lies Glasgow's financial district, known officially as the International Financial Services District (IFSD), although often irreverently nicknamed by the contemporary press as the "square kilometre" or "Wall Street on Clyde". Since the late 1980s the construction of many modern office blocks and high rise developments have paved the way for the IFSD to become one of the UKs largest financial quarters. With a reputation as an established financial services centre, coupled with comprehensive support services, Glasgow continues to attract and grow new business. Of the 10 largest general insurance companies in the UK, 8 have a base or head office in Glasgow - including Direct Line, Esure, AXA and Norwich Union. Key banking sector companies have also relocated some of their services to commercial property in Glasgow - Resolution, JPMorgan Chase, Abbey, HBOS, Barclays Wealth, Tesco Personal Finance, Morgan Stanley, Lloyds TSB, Clydesdale Bank, BNP Paribas, HSBC and the Royal Bank of Scotland. The Ministry of Defence have several departments and Clydeport, the Glasgow Stock Exchange, Student Loans Company, Scottish Executive Enterprise, Transport and Lifelong Learning Department, BT Group, Scottish Qualifications Authority and Scottish Enterprise also have their headquarters in the district.
