= St Andrew's in the Square =

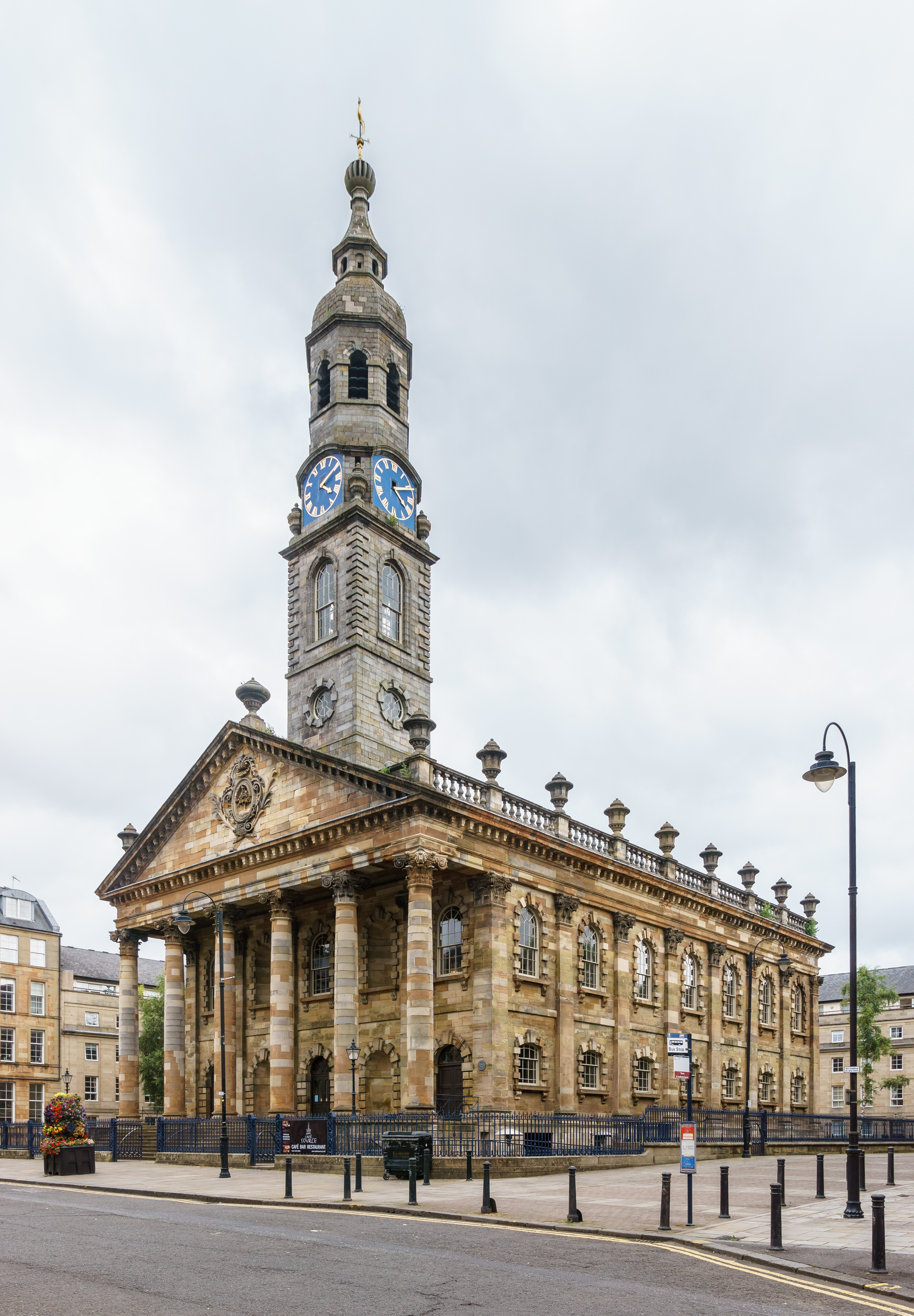
- Interactive map of the St Andrew's in the Square area
- Former names: St Andrew's Parish Church

General information
- Type: Church
- Architectural style: Neoclassical
- Location: Merchant City, Glasgow, St Andrew's Square
- Coordinates: 55°51′17.52″N 4°14′34.81″W
- Construction started: 1739
- Completed: 1756
- Renovated: 1998-2000
- Client: Tobacco Lords
- Owner: Glasgow Building Preservation Trust

Design and construction
- Architect: Allan Dreghorn
- Main contractor: Mungo Naismith

Renovating team
- Awards and prizes: Europa Nostra Diploma, Civic Trust Commendation, Glasgow Institute of Architects Special Award, Scottish Award for Quality in Planning, Dynamic Place Award, Royal Institution of Chartered Surveyors Commendation

St Andrew's in the Square is an 18th-century category-A-listed former church in Glasgow, Scotland, considered one of the finest classical churches in Scotland, and now Glasgow's Centre for Scottish Culture, promoting Scottish music, song and dance. The church is in St Andrew's Square, near Glasgow Cross and Glasgow Green, on the edge of the City's East End.

== History ==
The church, inspired by St Martin-in-the-Fields in London, was built between 1739 and 1756 by Master Mason Mungo Naismith, and designed by Allan Dreghorn. While construction of it was started before the nearby St Andrew's-by-the-Green, it was completed after, making it either the third or fourth oldest church in Glasgow, depending on criterion. The earlier two buildings were Glasgow Cathedral and the Trongate steeple. It was the first Presbyterian church built after the Reformation, and was commissioned by the city's Tobacco Lords as a demonstration of their wealth and power.

The church was enclosed by a later square, built by William Hamilton between 1786 and 1787, which became fashionable homes for some of Glasgow's wealthiest merchants. The migration of the city westwards throughout the 19th century, however, resulted in a gradual slumming of the area and a dwindling congregation. The church was last used for a religious service in June 1993.

St Andrew's has played its part in Scottish history; in December 1745, before the church's completion, the Jacobite army, led by Bonnie Prince Charlie, camped around the site, and within its semi-built walls, on its return from their failed battles in England. On 23 November 1785, huge crowds of Glaswegians gathered to watch Vincenzo Lunardi take off from the churchyard in a hot air balloon on a flight which took him south-east to Hamilton and Lanark, before eventually landing in Hawick. Agnes Maclehose (née Craig) married her husband James Maclehose in the church in 1776; Agnes is better known as Clarinda whose love letters to Robert Burns under the name Sylvander inspired him to write "Ae Fond Kiss" for her.

== Notable ministers ==
- Gavin Gibb, Moderator of the General Assembly of the Church of Scotland in 1817.

== Renovation ==
At the congregation's request, the church was acquired from them by the Glasgow Building Preservation Trust in October 1993 for the sum of £1. The Trust has since renovated the building, transforming it into a Centre for Traditional Scottish Music, Song and Dance. Victorian additions to the building have been removed, restoring the church's original light and airy feel, while a 4-5 metre deep excavation of the floor produced a basement cafe as well as dressing rooms, rehearsal space and toilets. The building was officially opened to the public on 30 November 2000; St Andrew's Day.

=== Awards ===
The renovation of St Andrew's in the Square has won the following awards:

- Europa Nostra Diploma
- Civic Trust Commendation
- Glasgow Institute of Architects Special Award
- Scottish Award for Quality in Planning
- Dynamic Place Award
- Royal Institution of Chartered Surveyors Commendation
