= St Andrew's Square, Glasgow =

Square in Glasgow, Scotland

Coordinates: 55.8549°N 4.2430°W

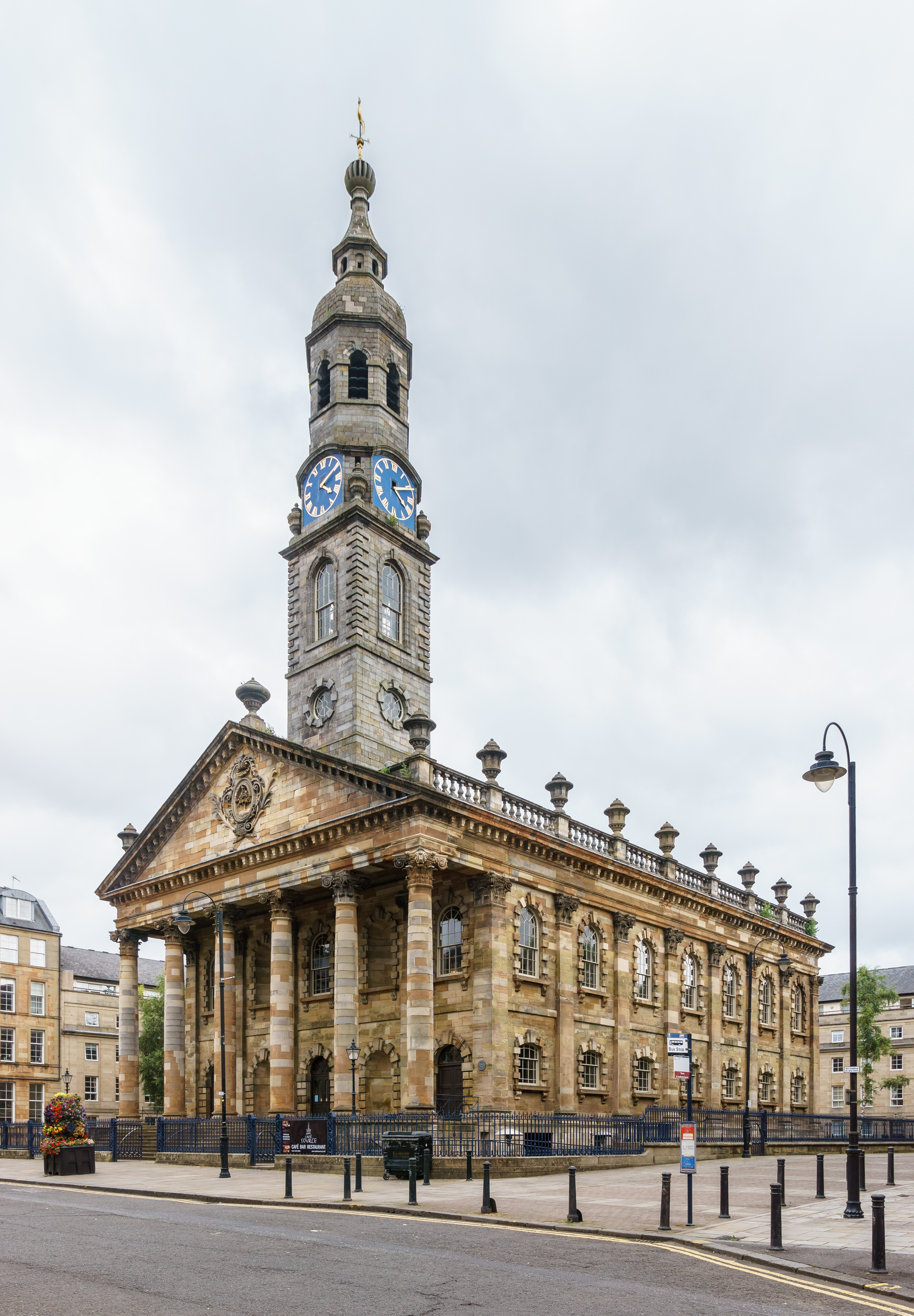
St Andrew's in the Square - Glasgow

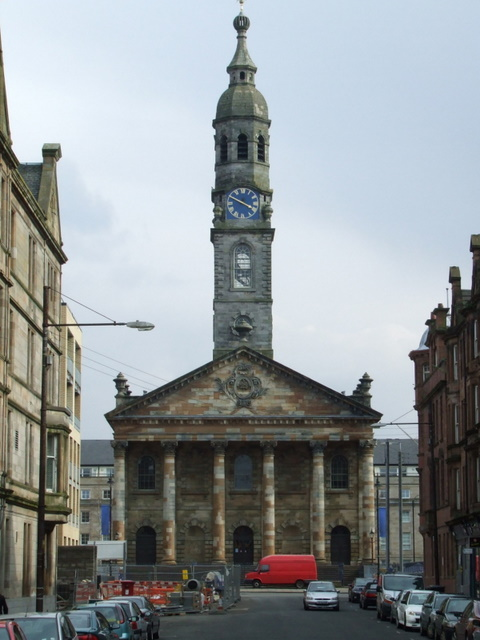
St Andrew's in the Square as viewed from St Andrew's Street.

St Andrew's Square is a public square in the city of Glasgow, Scotland and lies to the south east corner of Glasgow Cross, close to Glasgow Green. The square is noted for its immense 18th-century classical church, St Andrew's in the Square, from which the square takes its name. The church was completed in 1758, to the designs of architect Allan Dreghorn and master mason Mungo Naismith and is among the finest of its type anywhere in Britain. The interior has lavish 18th century rococo plasterwork. The building is Category A listed. It is one of six squares in the city centre.

The church standing amidst fields on the banks of the Molendinar Burn, was later enclosed by a square, encouraged by the town council who sold the ground to builder developer William Hamilton of Glassford, Lanarkshire, building between 1786 and the early 1790s. He was also the architect of the Tontine in the Trongate. The square became a fashionable residence for some of Glasgow's wealthiest merchants. "Here and in Virginia Street were domiciled the best and wealthiest in the city." The Royal Bank of Scotland opened here in the 18th century with David Dale in charge of the agency.

Sulman's panoramic Bird's Eye View of Glasgow published in 1864 shows the Square conveniently close to the mercantile centre of Glasgow Cross and the University of Glasgow in High Street. Industrialisation during the 19th century of the surrounding resulted in deterioration of houses as many residents moved westward Most of the buildings facing onto the square were demolished in the 1980s; as part of the GEAR Project, Glasgow East-end Recovery Project new buildings in Georgian style were constructed with help from the Scottish Development Agency, and making the square traffic-free.

== St Andrew's in the Square ==
St Andrew's in the Square is the former church in the centre of St Andrew's Square; it was inspired by St Martin-in-the-Fields in London. Formerly known as St Andrew's Church of Scotland Parish church, it was constructed between 1739 and 1756, and is the fourth oldest church in Glasgow, after the Cathedral, the Tron Church in Trongate and the nearby St Andrew's-by-the-Green. The church was the first Presbyterian church built in Glasgow after the Reformation. The first organ in a Presbyterian Church was opened in 1807 but its further performance was put a stop to until the opinion of the General Assembly was known. After the congregation moved to another site in 1993 it later reopened as an arts and function venue.
