= Glasgow Tolbooth =

Municipal Building in Scotland

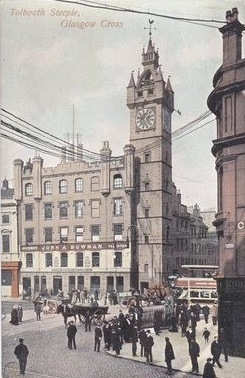
- Glasgow Tolbooth

- Shown in Glasgow
- 55.8568°N 4.2436°W
- Location: Glasgow Cross, Glasgow

History
- Built: 1634

Site notes
- Architect: John Boyd
- Architectural style: Scottish baronial style

Listed Building – Category A
- Official name: High Street, Glasgow Cross, the Tolbooth Steeple
- Designated: 6 July 1966
- Reference no.: LB32717

The Glasgow Tolbooth was a municipal structure at Glasgow Cross, Glasgow, Scotland. The main block, which was the meeting place of the Royal Burgh of Glasgow, was demolished in 1921 leaving only the steeple standing. The steeple is a Category A listed building.

== History ==
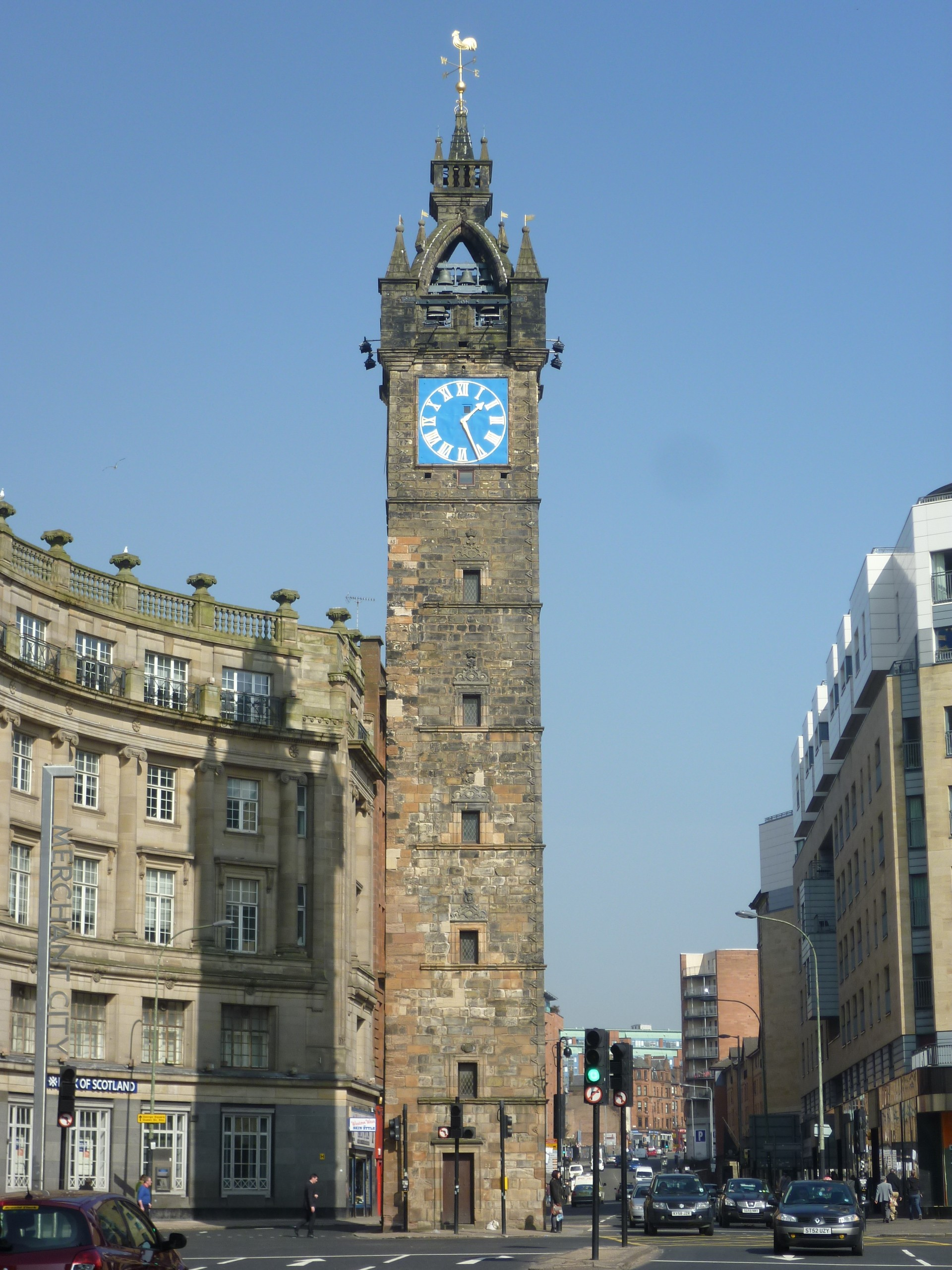
The surviving steeple

The first tolbooth erected on the site at Glasgow Cross dated back at least to the mid-14th century. After it became ruinous, construction work on a new tolbooth started in 1626. It was designed by the master of the works, John Boyd, in the Scottish baronial style, built in ashlar stone and was completed in 1634. The building was laid out in two parts: a five-storey main block and a seven-stage steeple at the east end.

The design of the main block involved a symmetrical main frontage with six bays facing onto Trongate; the ground floor was rusticated with a series of openings, the first, second and third floors were fenestrated with rectangular windows with architraves while the fourth floor was fenestrated with segmental headed windows. The end bays on the fourth floor were flanked by bartizans and the roof line was castellated. The design of the steeple involved small leaded glass windows for each of the second to sixth stages and clock faces in the seventh stage, all surmounted by a corbelled parapet, a prominent crown spire and a weather vane. The weather vane was gilded by the decorative painter, Valentine Jenkin.

The building was used as a prison and courthouse in the 17th and 18th centuries: a total of 22 executions took place at the tolbooth over that period. Covenanters who were held in the tolbooth in poor conditions in the 17th century included Donald Cargill and Robert Ker of Kersland. The tolbooth also incorporated the burgh chambers and a tavern and its steeple was 126 feet (38 m) high.

The building continued in these uses until the authorities relocated to the new public offices in the Saltmarket in 1814. After being sold for commercial use, the tolbooth was renovated to a design by David Hamilton and was used as a drapery warehouse from 1874, before becoming the offices of a firm of auctioneers, John A. Bowman. By the early 20th century the tolbooth was very dilapidated: after the main block had been demolished in 1921, essential repairs and modifications were made to the west face of the steeple, where the tolbooth had previously adjoined it, to a design by Keppie Henderson, in 1923.

On 4 June 2021, a night time light projection onto the steeple was installed, under the Climate Clock initiative. The projected deadline and lifeline statistics counted the time window before 1.5 °C warming becomes inevitable, and the percentage of global energy delivered through renewables, respectively. This initiative was implemented in anticipation of the COP-26 summit in Glasgow in November 2021.

== See also ==
- List of listed buildings in Glasgow/2
- List of Category A listed buildings in Glasgow
