= Allan Dreghorn =

Scottish architect

Allan Dreghorn (1706–1764) was an 18th-century Scottish architect largely associated with Glasgow.

== Life ==
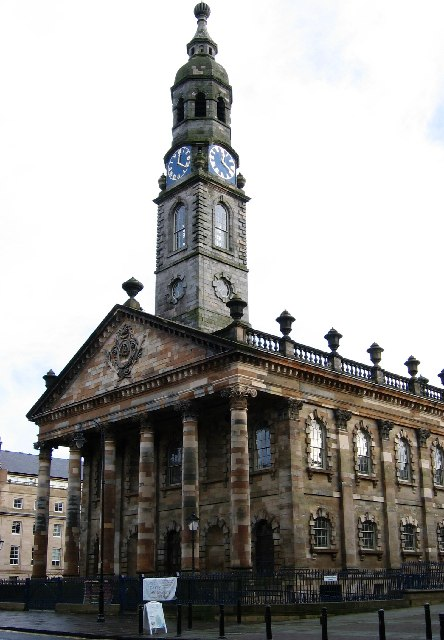
St Andrew's Church in Glasgow

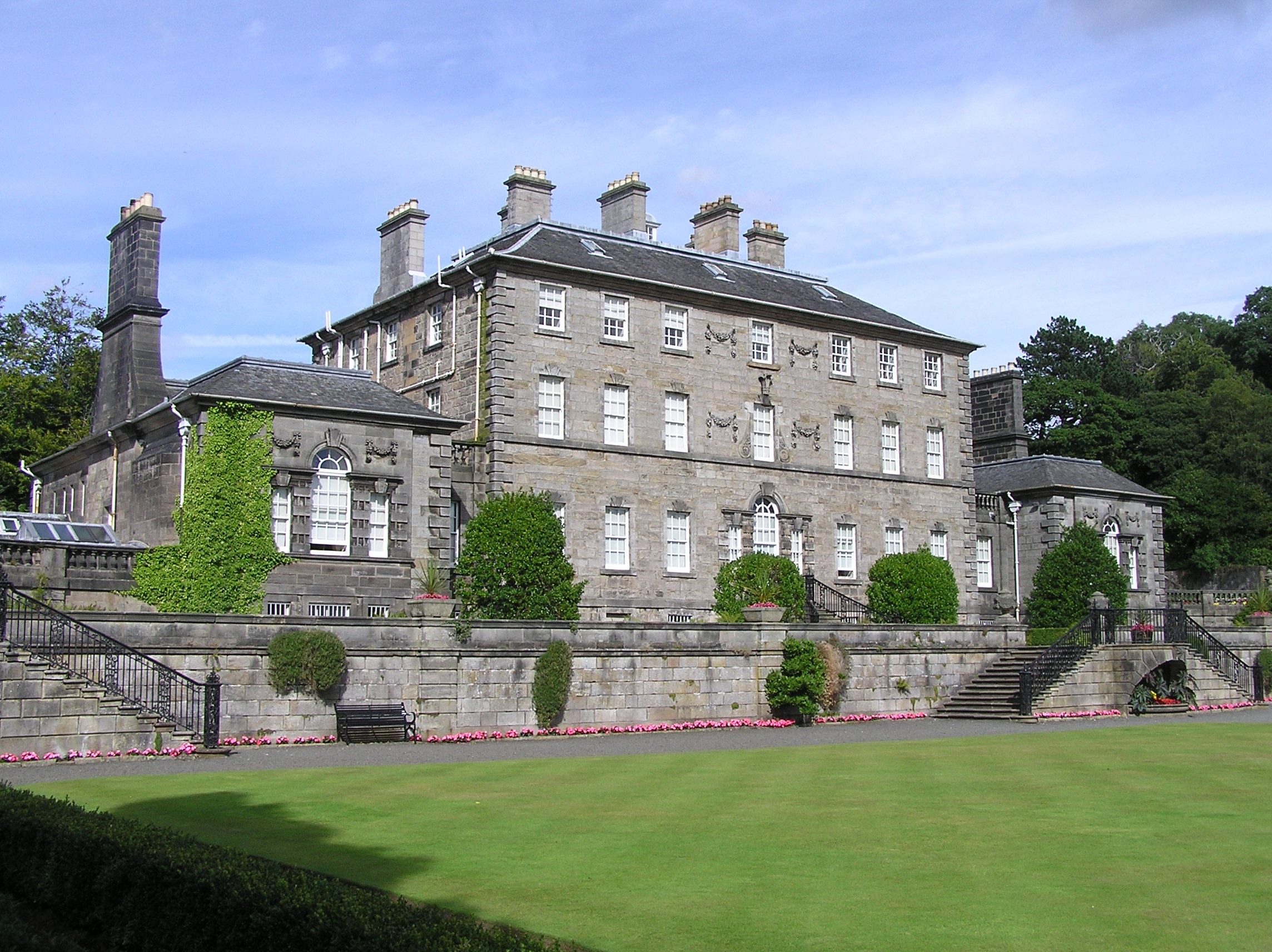
Pollok House

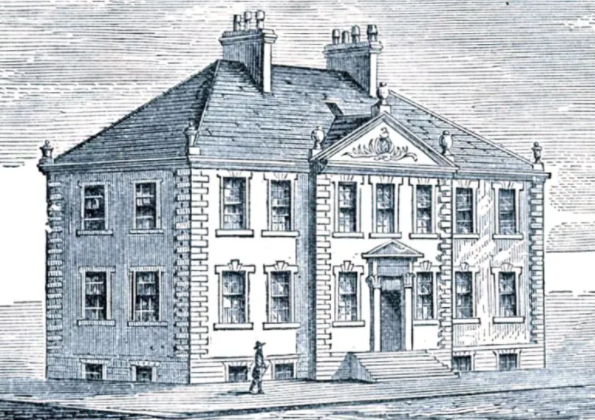
Dreghorn Mansion in Glasgow

He was born in Glasgow the son of Robert Dreghorn of Ruchill and his wife Margaret Dickie.

He was involved in several fields: including the family coach-building business and a partner in the Smithfield Ironworks and he owned a timber yard on Clyde Street. From 1742 to 1756 he ran the company Allan Dreghorn & Co. In later years he moved to building projects, proving himself a very capable architect.

He was city treasurer from 1739 and was elected a Bailie in 1741. He was said to be the first non-aristocratic person to have their own four-wheeled carriage in Glasgow (presumably self-built).

His architectural work embraced sculpture by Mungo Naismith and David Cation and the plasterer Thomas Clayton.

In 1745 Dreghorn was one of the negotiators alongside Provost Andrew Cochrane who agreed the sum to be paid to the Jacobite army to save the city from plunder.

In 1750 he was joint founder of the Old Ship Bank. In the same year he was involved in the public roup for the Glasgow ship "Bess".

In 1752 using the profits from his success he built his own house on Great Clyde Street.

He died at his country estate of Ruchill House in October 1768.

== Family ==
He married Isobella Bryson (1716-1786) daughter of John Bryson of Craigallan.They had three daughters and one son.

Their son (or perhaps nephew), Robert Dreghorn (nicknamed "Bob Dragon" 1748-1806), was a well-known Glasgow character whose looks led him to be used as a threat to children: "Bob Dragon will get you". Bob was disfigured by smallpox at a young age and was heavily pock-marked with one eye missing and a crooked nose. He hanged himself in 1806 at the Dreghorn mansion.

== Works attributed to Dreghorn ==
- Glasgow University Library (1732)
- Old Glasgow Town Hall at Trongate (1736) demolished 1911
- Pollok House (1747)
- St Andrews-in-the-Fields, central Glasgow

== Artistic recognition ==
In 1994 a medallion head of Dreghorn by sculptor Alexander Stoddart was added on the building at 178-182 Ingram Street.

== Trivia ==
The grounds of Ruchill House now form Ruchill Park.
