= James Hoey Craigie =

Scottish architect (1870–1930)

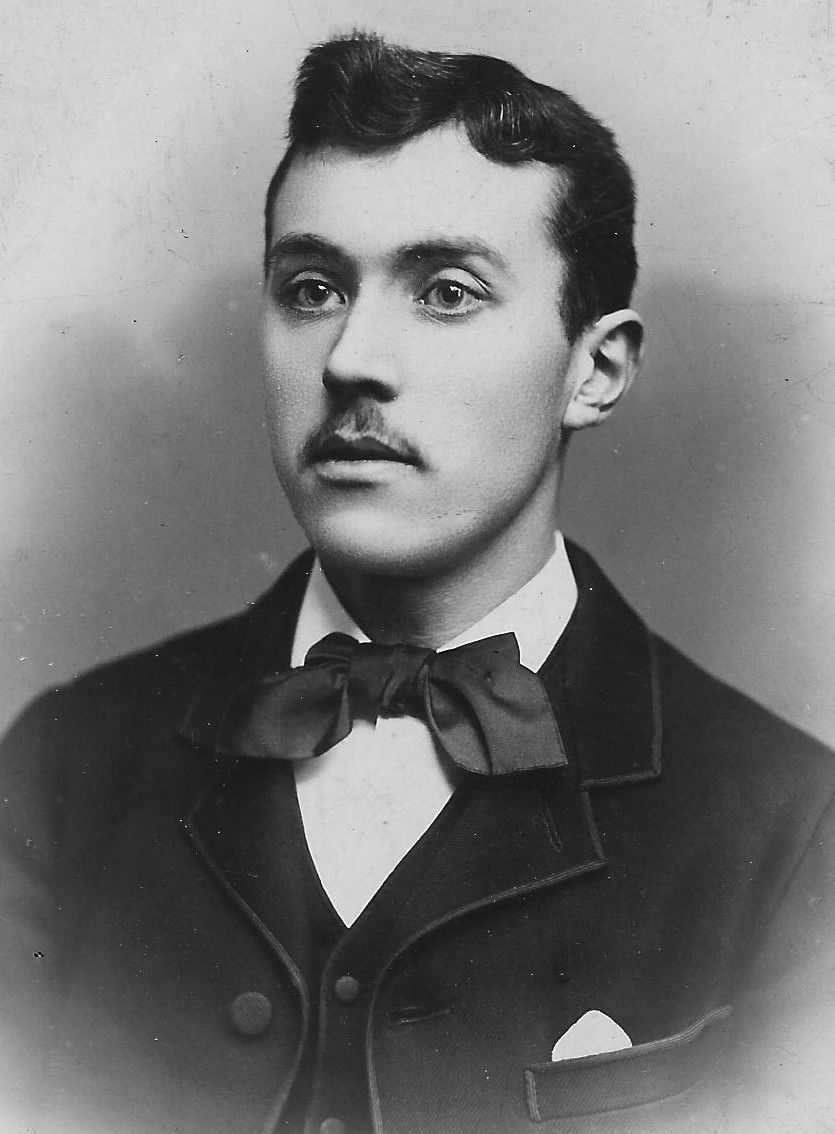
- Born: 7 May 1870; Glasgow, Scotland
- Died: 30 March 1930 (aged 59); Glasgow, Scotland
- Education: Glasgow School of Art
- Occupation: Architect
- Awards: Alexander Thomson travelling scholarship
- Practice: Clarke & Bell & J H Craigie
- Buildings: Grosvenor Building, Glasgow; Corona Bar, Langside; St Mary's Parish Church, Kirkintilloch; Lewis's Department Store, Glasgow

James Hoey Craigie TD FRIBA (7 May 1870 – 30 March 1930) was a Scottish architect. He studied at the Glasgow School of Art. In 1894 he won the Alexander Thomson travelling scholarship which he spent in France and Italy. In 1905 he was made a partner in the firm Clarke & Bell, its name changing to Clarke & Bell & J H Craigie.

== Significant works ==
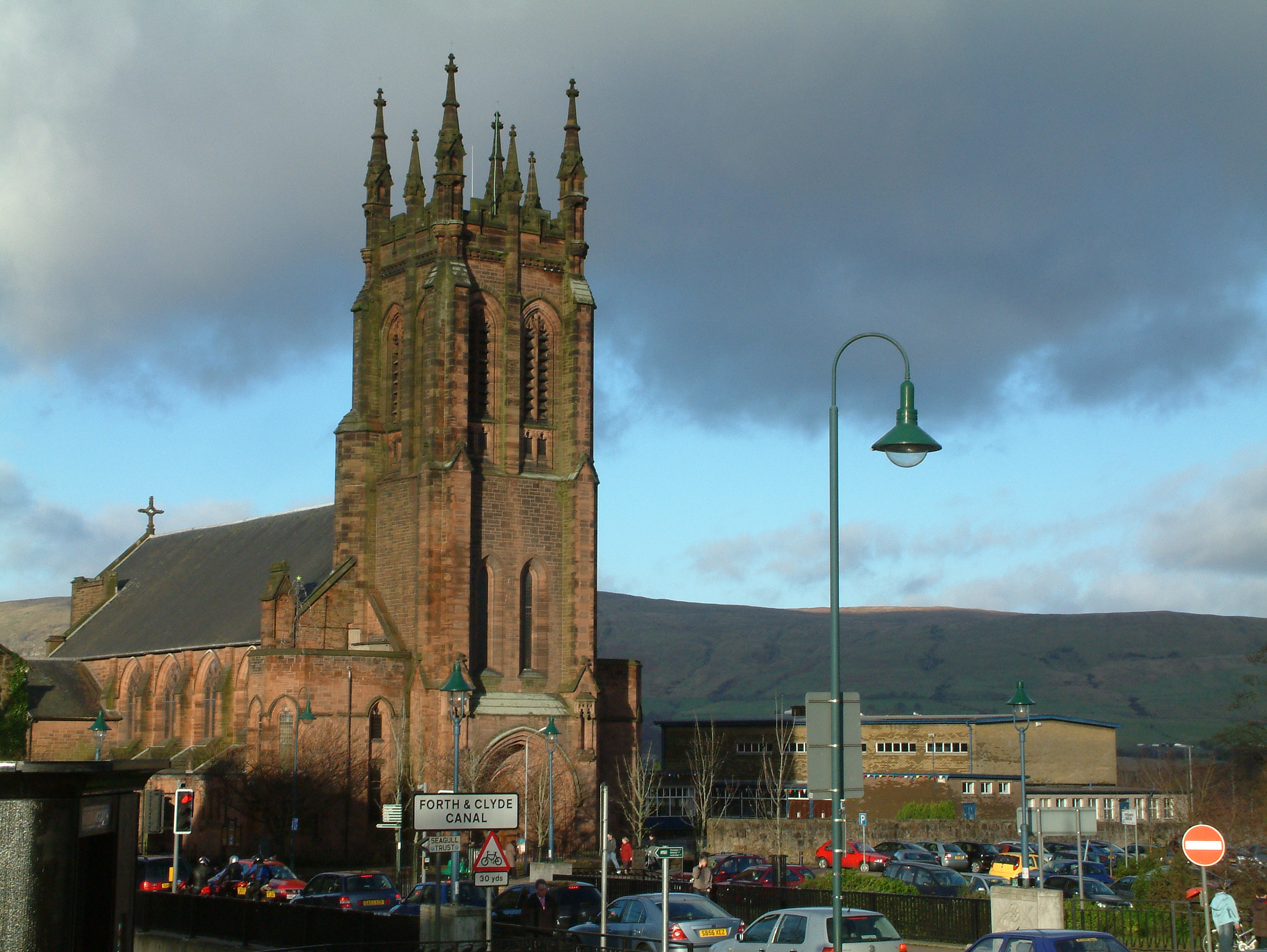
St Mary's Parish Church in Kirkintilloch

Craigie's significant work includes the domed roof and restaurant additions to the Grosvenor Building, 72–80 Gordon Street (1902–07); Art Nouveau remodelling of early 19th century tenement, 186–188 Argyle Street (1908); the reconstruction of the Justiciary Buildings in Glasgow (1910–13); Corona Bar, Langside (1912–13); and St Mary's Parish Church, Kirkintilloch (1912–14).

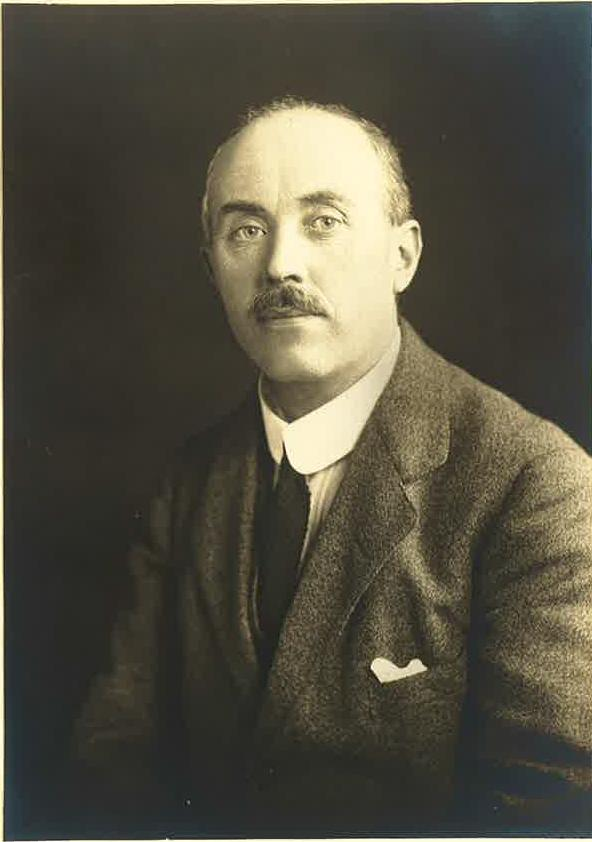
Circa 1925

In 1929, Craigie was commissioned to design a new Department Store with 380,000 square feet (35,000 m^{2}) of shopping space for the firm of Lewis's Limited, who had bought over an old Glasgow firm, John Anderson's "Royal Polytechnic" known to Glaswegians as "The Poly". He worked closely with Frederick Marquis (later Lord Woolton) who subsequently became Managing Director of Lewis's. They were most thorough in their planning and Craigie and Marquis toured the country inspecting all department stores with the object of ensuring that the new store would embrace everything that was good in its construction. They visited London, Liverpool, Manchester and Birmingham and incorporated all the knowledge acquired into the plans for the Glasgow Store. Craigie's biggest difficulty was to find a sure method of keeping the River Clyde out of the basement.

== Military service ==
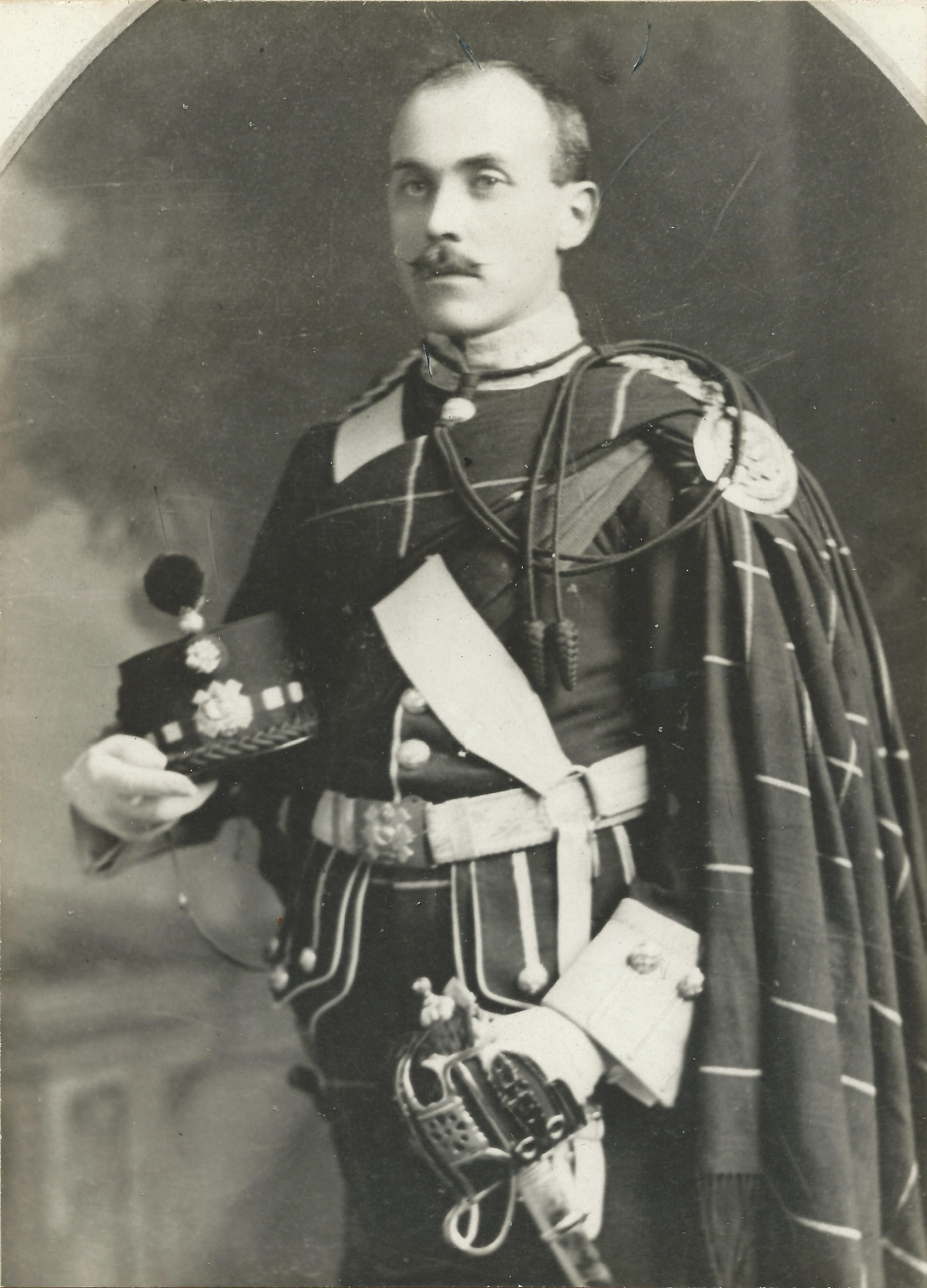
Circa 1918

Craigie served as a captain in the Royal Engineers during the First World War, holding a commission in the 7th Battalion of the Highland Light Infantry from 1908, and was awarded the Territorial Decoration in 1917.

== Personal life ==
Craigie was a member of Cathcart Parish Council from 1913 and was its chairman in 1922–23. He was married three times, and had four children with his second wife. He died of liver cancer on 30 March 1930.
