= Saltmarket =

Street in Glasgow City, Scotland

- A8
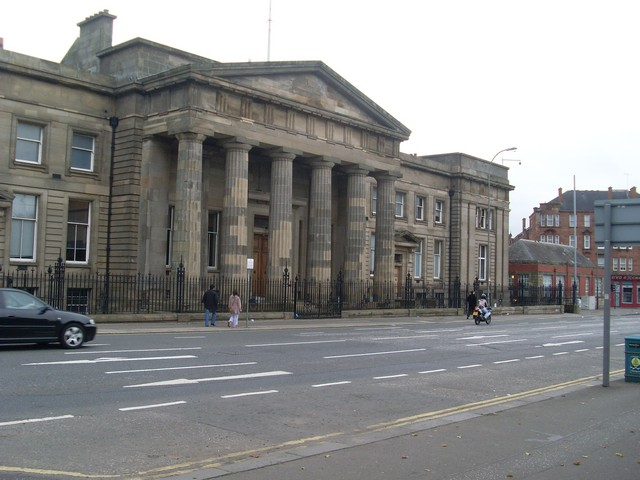
- The Justiciary Buildings on Saltmarket
- Former name(s): Waulcergait
- Length: 0.3 mi (0.48 km)
- Postal code: G1 5
- Coordinates: 55.8542°N 4.2460°W
- north end: Glasgow Cross; A8 (High Street) A749 (London Road); A89 (Gallowgate); Trongate

- south end: A8 (Crown Street) A814 (Clyde Street)

The Saltmarket is a thoroughfare in the City of Glasgow, Scotland. It is a southward continuation of the High Street, running south from Glasgow Cross to the junction with Clyde Street and Crown Street by the River Clyde. It runs past the High Court of Glasgow and also Glasgow Green. Along with the High Street and Crown Street it forms part of the A8.

== History ==
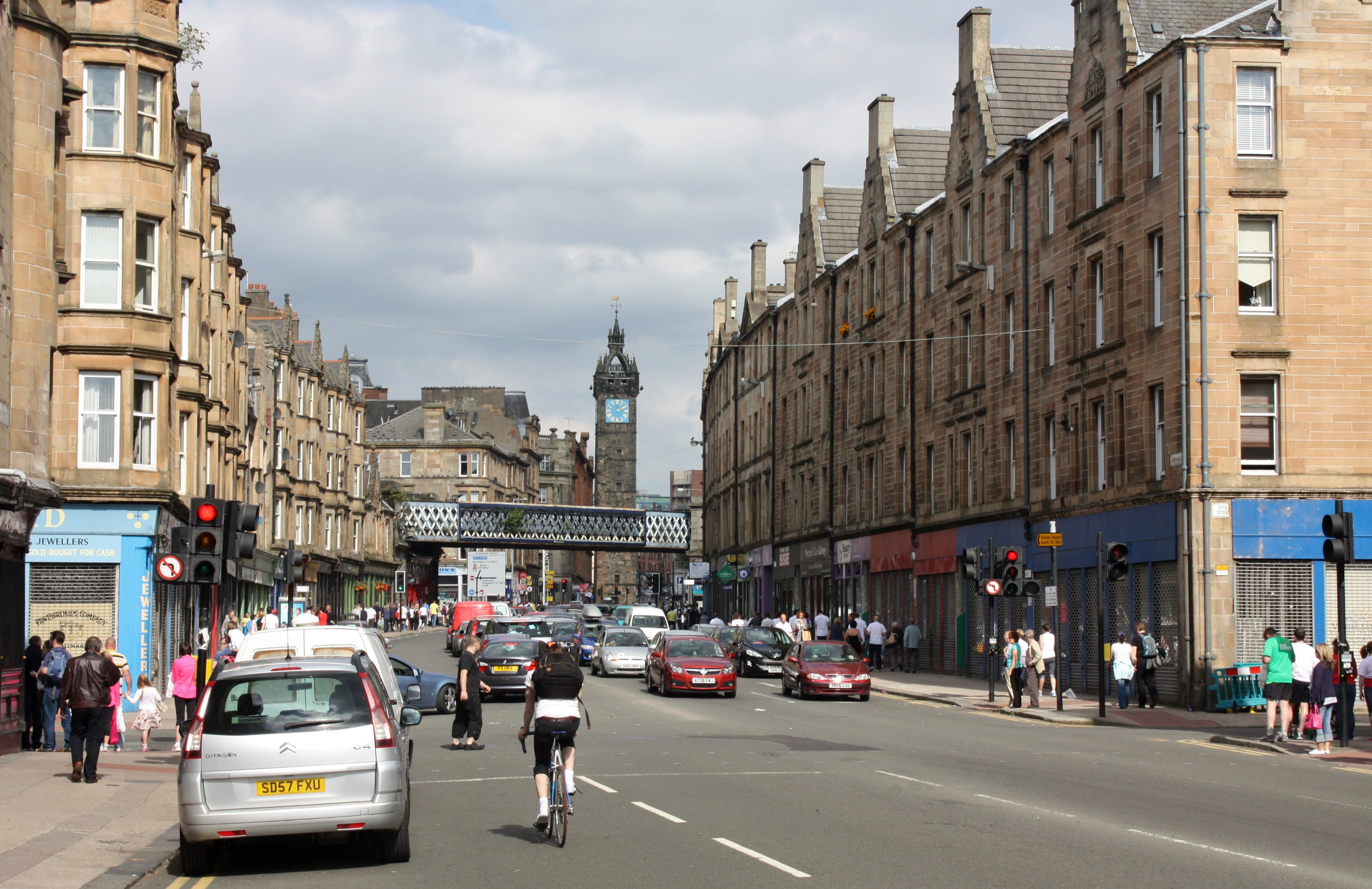
Saltmarket, looking north to the Tolbooth Steeple at Glasgow Cross

Originally named Waulcergait, the area was associated with wool production, in particular the fulling (Scots waulking) of the cloth. In the 18th century it became a fashionable residential district, close to the Merchant City.

The Justiciary Buildings were constructed in 1814, but largely rebuilt in 1910–1913, with only the portico of the earlier building retained. It is now a category A listed building. Across the road is the McLennan Arch, which dates to 1796, but was moved to its present site in 1992.

In 1845 the City Theatre was opened on the Saltmarket, on a site next to the Courts. It burned to the ground just five months later, followed a month after that by Cooke's Circus next door. Later in the 19th century the Saltmarket became a notorious slum, with many illicit bars. In the early 20th century, the City Improvement Trust undertook clearance of the slums, building new tenements along Saltmarket, as well as new public houses. Further renewal of the area took place in the 2000s.
