= Justiciary Buildings, Glasgow =

Judicial building in Glasgow, Scotland

Justiciary Buildings
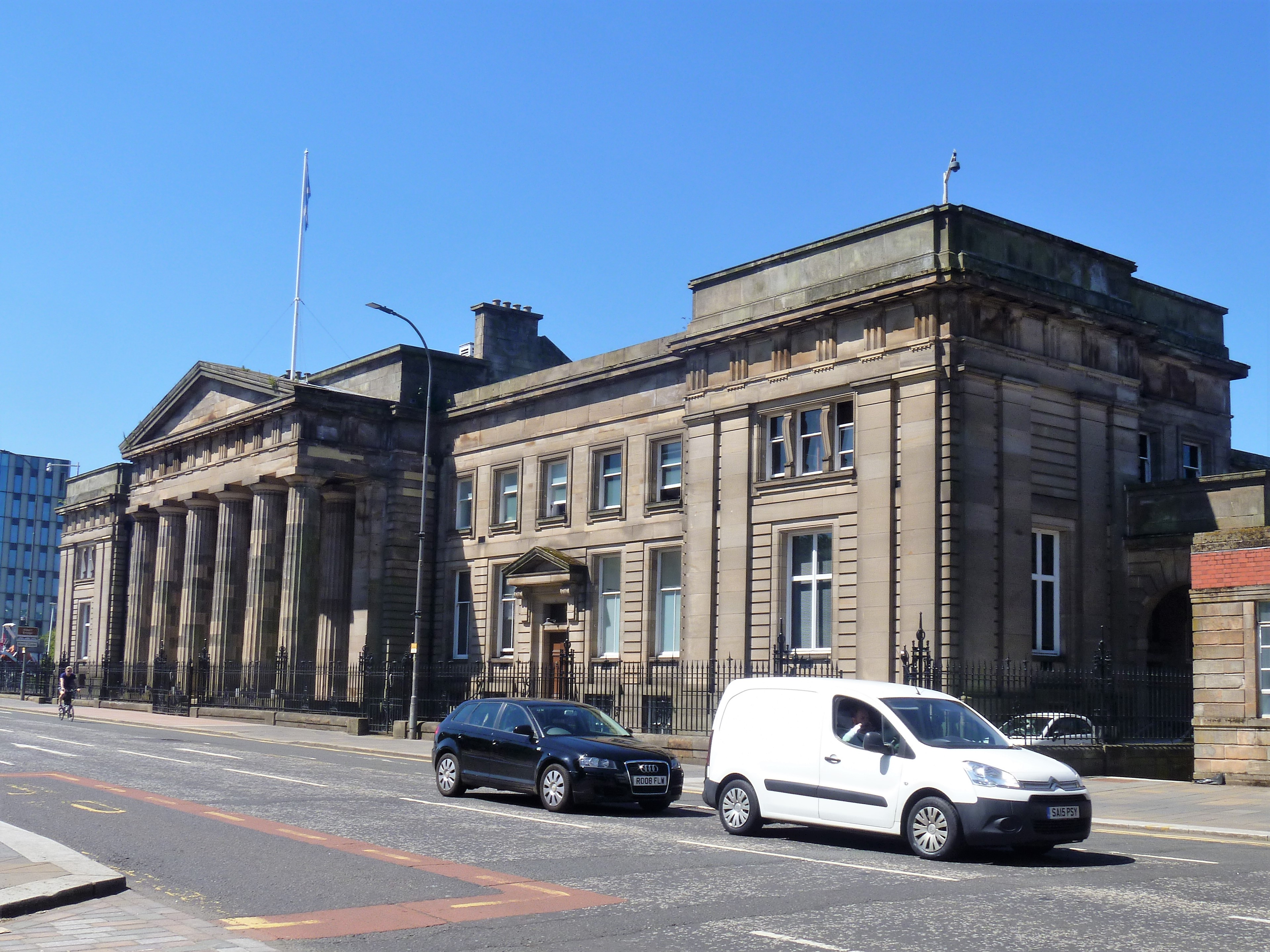
- Justiciary Buildings

- Shown in Glasgow
- 55.8537°N 4.2469°W
- Location: Saltmarket, Glasgow

History
- Built: 1814

Site notes
- Architect: William Stark
- Architectural style: Neoclassical style

Listed Building – Category A
- Official name: Justiciary Courts, excluding extension to Mart Street, 212 Saltmarket Street, Glasgow
- Designated: 15 December 1970
- Reference no.: LB32844

The Justiciary Buildings is a judicial complex in the Saltmarket in Glasgow, Scotland. The complex, which operates in conjunction with similar facilities in Edinburgh and Aberdeen, is dedicated for the use of the High Court of Justiciary, which is the supreme criminal court in Scotland. It is a Category A listed building.

== History ==
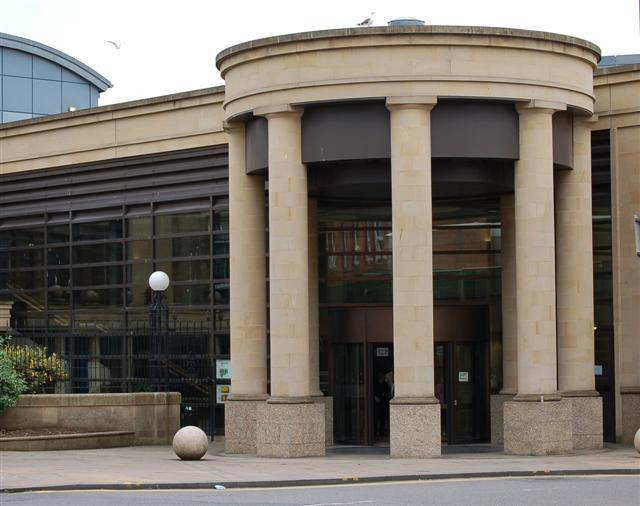
Mart Street entrance, part of the 1997 extension

The building was commissioned to replace the Glasgow Tolbooth at Glasgow Cross as the main municipal and judicial building in Glasgow. It was designed by William Stark in the neoclassical style, built in ashlar stone and was completed in 1814.

The design involved a symmetrical main frontage with seventeen bays facing onto the Saltmarket. The central section of five bays was formed by a full-height hexastyle portico with Doric order columns supporting an entablature, a frieze with triglyphs and a pediment. The wing sections, of five bays each, featured pedimented doorways in the central bay and were fenestrated by sash windows. The end bays, which slightly projected forward, were fenestrated by cross windows on the ground floor and by tripartite windows on the first floor; they were flanked by full height pairs of pilasters supporting an entablature, a frieze with triglyphs and a parapet. The central pediment above the portico originally contained the coat of arms of the City of Glasgow in the tympanum. Internally, the principal rooms were the Justiciary Hall, which was located in the centre of the range behind the portico, the burgh courtroom, which was located to the north of the Justiciary Hall, and the city council chamber, which was located to the south of the Justiciary Hall. The lord provost's room and the offices of the town clerks were on the first floor.

A tunnel took condemned prisoners from the Justiciary Hall to the place of execution in Jocelyn Square, then known as Jail Square: 67 men and four women were publicly hanged in the square. The building became wholly dedicated to judicial use after the city council relocated to the city and county buildings in Wilson Street in 1844.

In the early 20th century, it was decided to remodel the complex, in conjunction with similar facilities in Edinburgh and Aberdeen, for the exclusive use of the High Court of Justiciary, which is the supreme criminal court in Scotland. The work was undertaken to a design by James Hoey Craigie of Clarke & Bell between 1910 and 1913. The building was significantly extended to the rear to a design by TBV Consult, the architectural arm of Tarmac Construction, in 1997. The complex was further extended in 2007, and again in 2016, in order to increase the capacity of the complex to nine courtrooms.

== See also ==
- List of listed buildings in Glasgow/11
- List of Category A listed buildings in Glasgow
