= Glasgow Cross =

Street in Glasgow City, Scotland

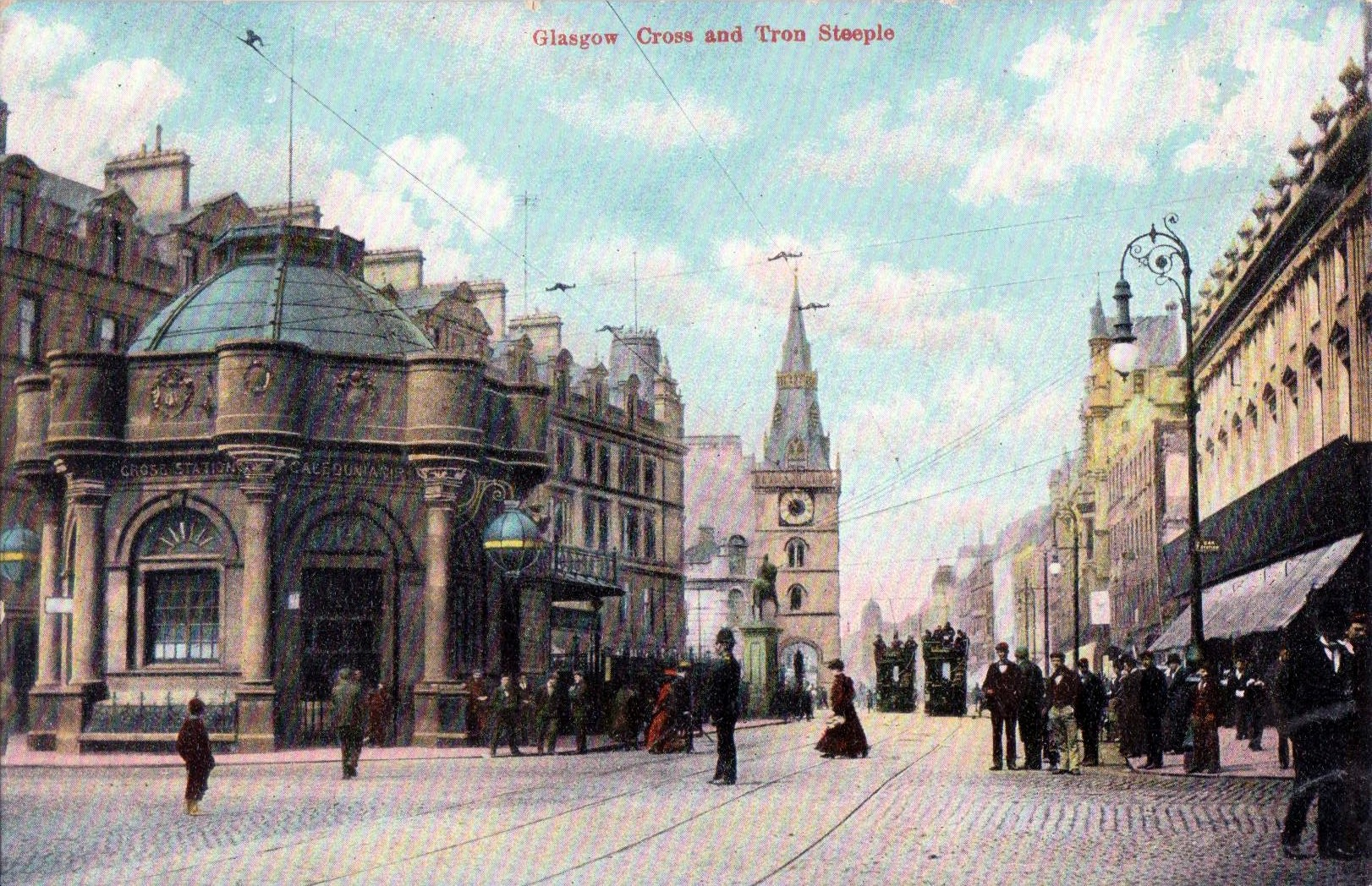
- Glasgow Cross looking west along Trongate in the 1900s

Location
- Glasgow
- Coordinates: 55.85659°N 4.24379°W
- Roads at junction: High Street; Gallowgate; London Road; Saltmarket; Trongate

Construction
- Type: Signal-controlled intersection

Glasgow Cross is at the hub of the ancient royal burgh and now city of Glasgow, Scotland, close to its first crossing over the River Clyde. It marks the notional boundary between the city centre and the East End

As a major junction at the gateway into the city centre, its five streets run: north up the High Street to Glasgow Cathedral, Cathedral Square and the Royal Infirmary; east along Gallowgate and London Road, close to St Andrew's Square; south on the Saltmarket to Glasgow Green and the Justiciary Buildings; and west along Trongate continuing as Argyle Street towards St Enoch Square and Buchanan Street.

Its most recognisable features are the Tolbooth Steeple, the surviving part of the 17th century Glasgow Tolbooth, and the mercat cross replica commissioned in 1929 by William George Black, and designed by architect Edith Hughes.

Linked to the Tolbooth stood the Tontine Hotel and its Assembly Rooms, designed from 1737 by architect Allan Dreghorn with adaptations in 1781 by architect William Hamilton of St Andrew's Square. The Tontine was the exchange centre of early mercantile business and the focal point of political and social gatherings. A number of artist paintings over the centuries depict Glasgow Cross, the Tolbooth and Tontine. In front of the Tontine was placed the equestrian statue of King William III, erected in 1734; now sited at Cathedral Square. After the Tolbooth Steeple, the nearby Tron Theatre, formerly the Tron Kirk, built in 1794 is one of the oldest buildings in the city.

The presently disused Glasgow Cross railway station sits beneath the junction.

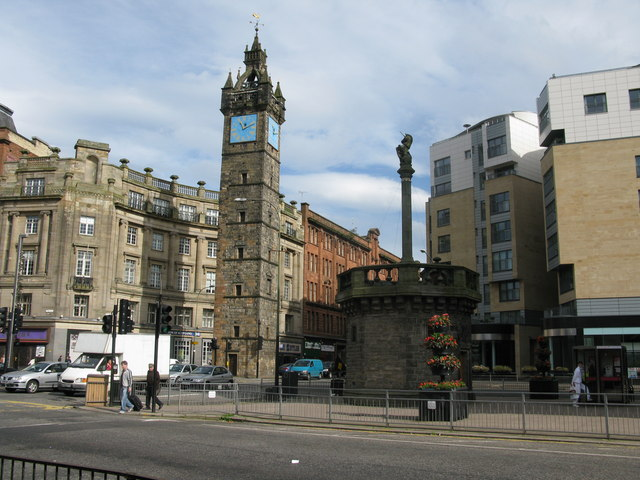
Glasgow Cross with Tolbooth Steeple and Mercat Cross.

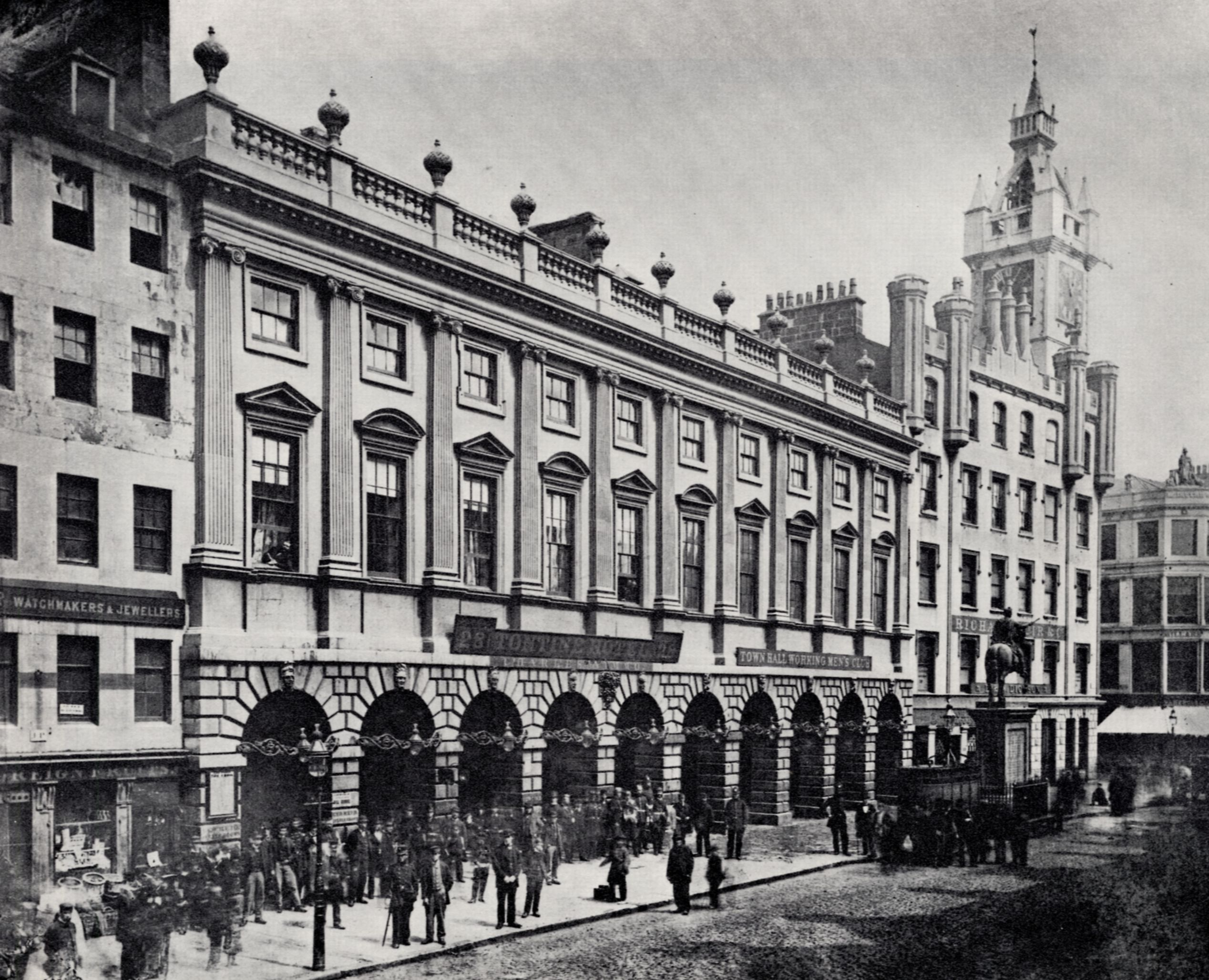
Tontine Buildings, Tolbooth, Steeple and King William equestrian statue at Glasgow Cross, 1868 photograph by Thomas Annan

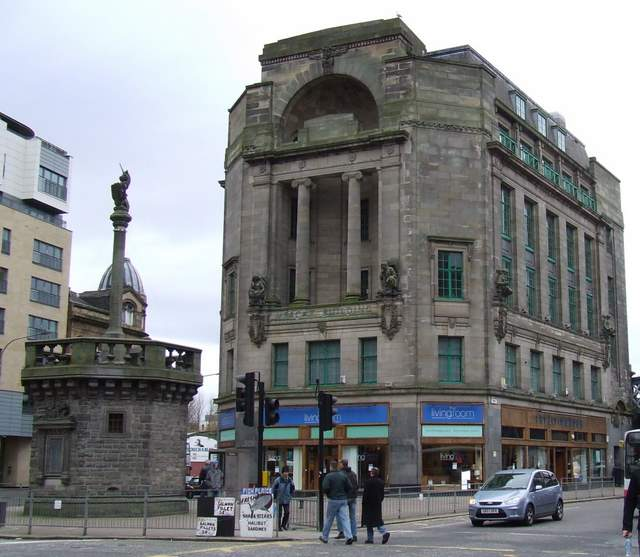
Mercat Cross and Mercat Building at Glasgow Cross
