= Gavin Gibb =

Scottish minister

Gavin Gibb (c.1765–1831) was a Scottish minister who served as Moderator of the General Assembly of the Church of Scotland in 1817/18. He was also Professor of Hebrew and Oriental Languages at Glasgow University.

== Life ==
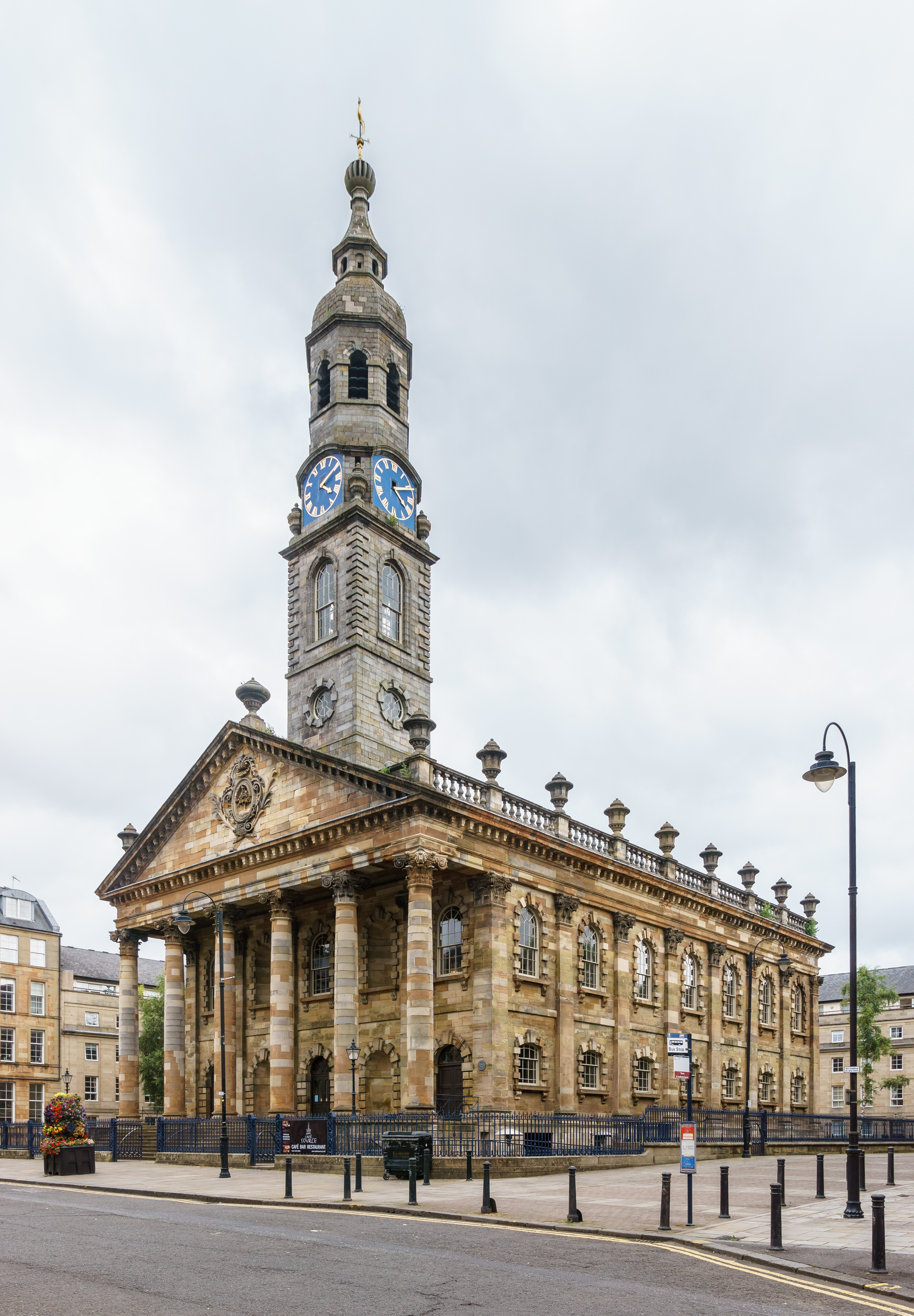
St Andrew's in Glasgow

He was the second son of Andrew Gibb of Auchinleck in Ayrshire. He studied at Glasgow University and graduated MA in 1783. He was licensed to preach as a Church of Scotland minister by the Presbytery of Irvine in June 1786.

In April 1787 he was ordained as minister of Fintry then translated to Strathblane, north of Glasgow, in September 1791. In November 1804 Glasgow University awarded him an honorary Doctor of Divinity. He was chosen by Glasgow Town Council to be minister of St Andrew's Church in Glasgow, moving there in February 1809. The church is now known as St Andrew's in the Square to distinguish it from St Andrew's Cathedral. He was also, together with his post at St Andrew's Church, Professor of Hebrew at Glasgow University.

In Glasgow he lodged at 13 College Street in 1815.

In 1817 he succeeded Very Rev John Cook as Moderator and was succeeded in turn by Rev John Campbell.

He died in Glasgow on 9 June 1831.

== Family ==
In 1784 he married Mary Studley (d.1842). Their children included William Richardson Gibb (1787-1855) who served as a surgeon in the Peninsular War and was then surgeon at Glasgow Royal Infirmary.

== Publications ==
- Elements of Hebrew Grammar (1819)
