= Collegiate Church of the Blessed Virgin Mary and St Anne, Glasgow =

Coordinates: 55.85686°N 4.24554°W

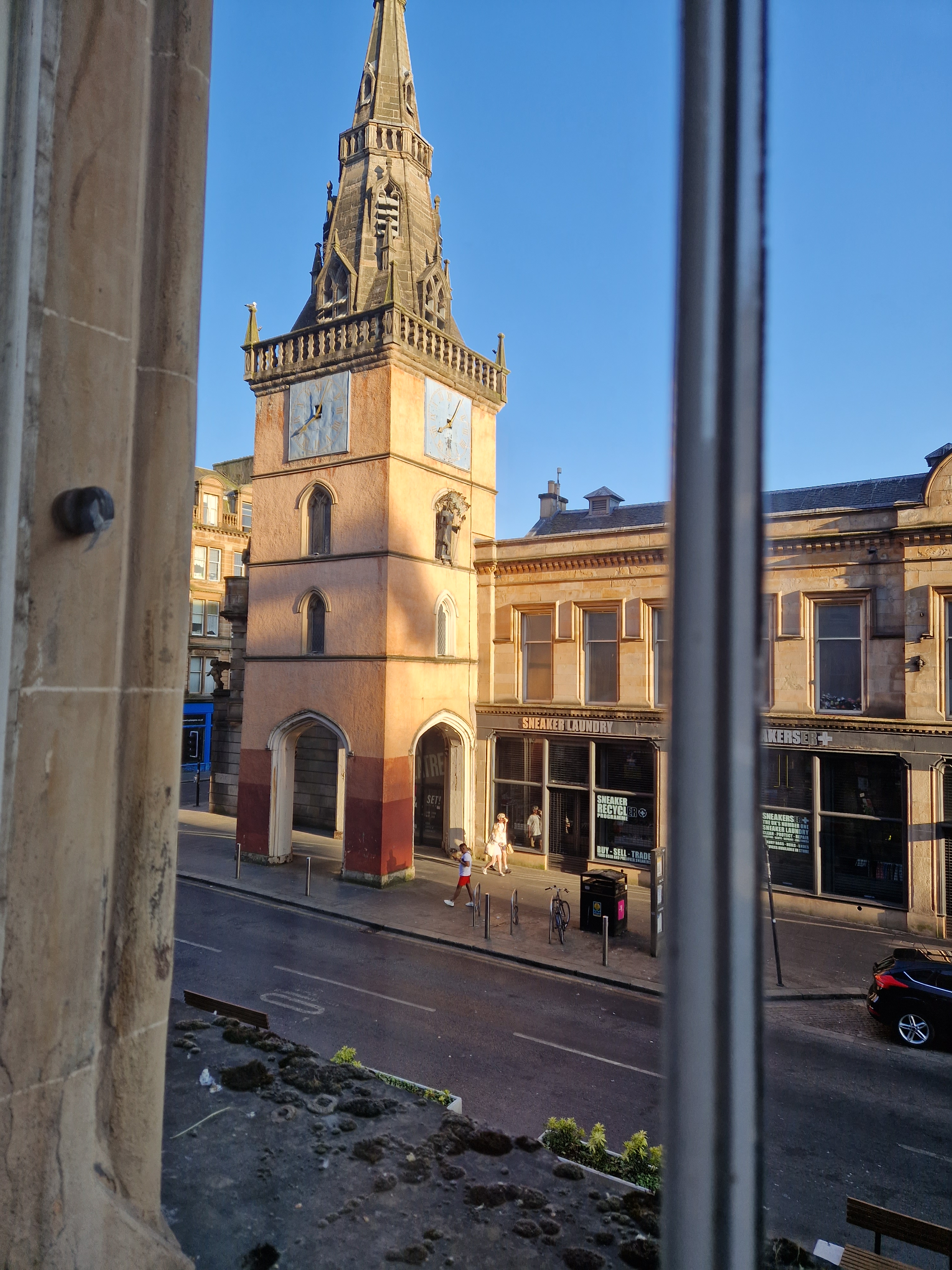
Collegiate Church of the Blessed Virgin Mary and St Anne, Glasgow

The Collegiate Church of the Blessed Virgin Mary and St Anne, Glasgow, was founded in the middle of the sixteenth century by James Houstoun, Subdean of Glasgow and Rector of the University of Glasgow from 1534 to 1541. The church was located on the south side of Trongate. Two copies of its Latin constitution, dating from 1549, have survived in the city archives. These provide detailed information about the structure of the college and its funding. James Houstoun's original provision was for a Provost, eight canons or prebends, and three choristers, but later benefactions extended this. The prebends were supported by property scattered across the city, and in Dalry, Maybole and Rutherglen.

The third prebend was the organist, who was also in charge of the Song School for the instruction of the youth in plainsong and descant, which stood on the west side of the church. When their voices broke, choristers would continue their education at the Grammar School.

The canons wore fur-trimmed red hoods, and surplices which were to be washed once a year. The daily pattern of services is carefully laid out. St Anne's Day, 26 July, was marked with much pomp and ringing of bells, after which money for bread and ale was distributed to the canons, to thirty paupers, eight scholars, and the residents of the Hospital of St Nicholas by the cathedral. The lepers of St Ninian's Hospital received their share at a safe distance in the churchyard.

At the Reformation in Scotland in 1560, this all came to an end. In 1570, the church was described as ruinous, when it passed into the hands of a city burgess, James Fleming. It later returned to use as a parish church of the Church of Scotland. In the 17th century a gothic spire was built. The church burnt down in 1793, and a new church was built to a classical design but retaining the spire. The kirk was designed by architect James Adam who was the joint architect of the very new Royal Infirmary, and a few years later the architect of the city's Assembly Rooms in Ingram Street. One of its most celebrated ministers was the evangelical and enterprising Rev Dr Thomas Chalmers.

Much later, the Tron congregation merged with St George's on Buchanan Street in 1940 to form St George's Tron Church; after a period of disuse, the building – the Tron Kirk or Laigh Kirk – was converted into the Tron Theatre in the early 1980s.

== See also ==
- List of Collegiate churches in Scotland

=== References ===
- Liber Collegii Nostri Domine &c., Maitland Club, 1846.
- Glasghu Facies – The History of Glasgow, James Gordon, 1873.
