= High Street, Glasgow =

Street in Glasgow, Scotland

Coordinates: 55.85881°N 4.24174°W

High Street
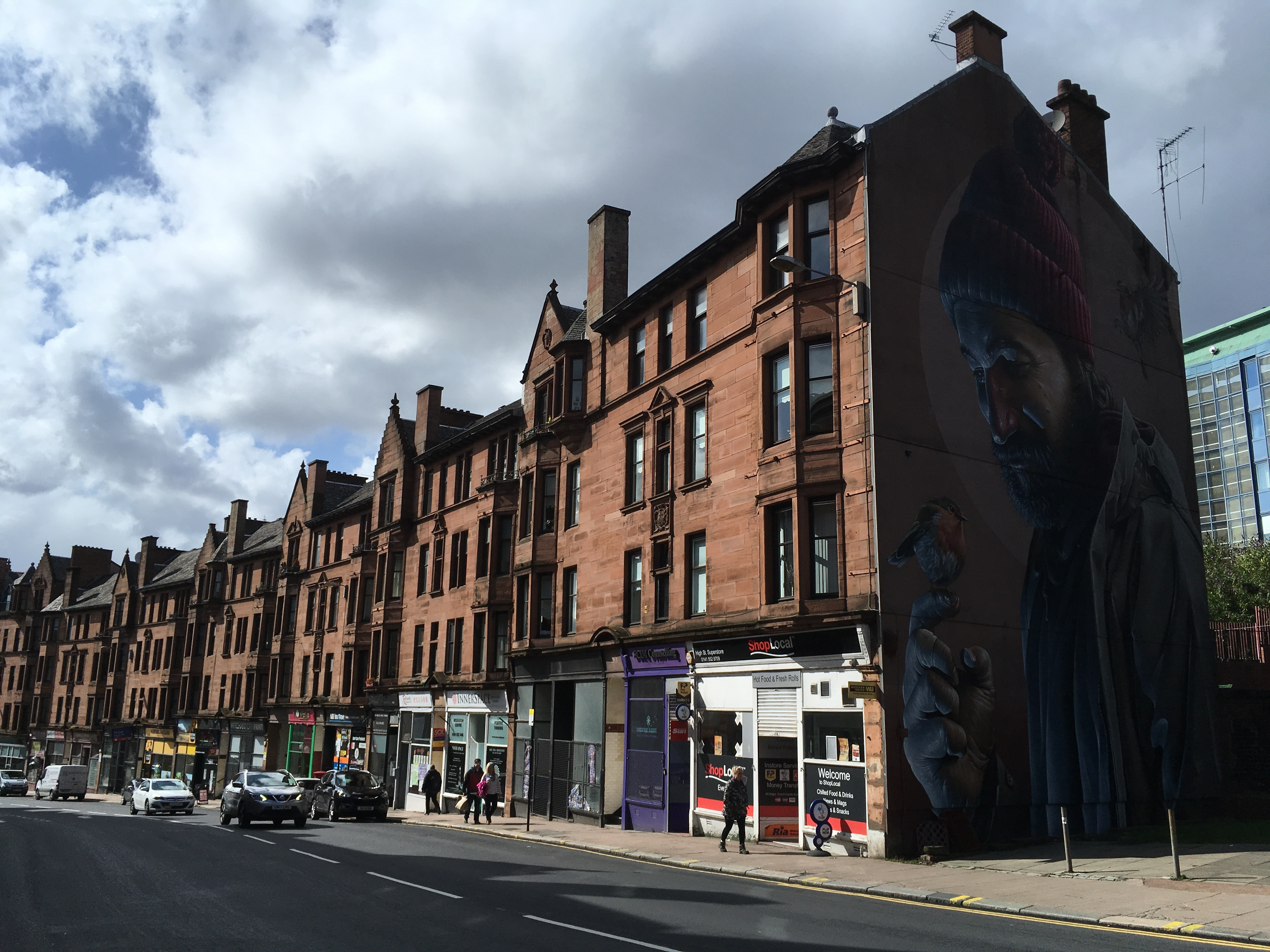
- Victorian tenements located at the northern end of the street. A mural depicting a "modern-day St. Mungo" can be seen.
- Interactive map of High Street
- Part of: A8
- Maintained by: Glasgow City Council; Transport Scotland
- Length: 700 m (2,300 ft)
- Location: Glasgow, Scotland
- Postal code: G1

High Street is the oldest, and one of the most historically significant, streets in Glasgow, Scotland. Originally the city's main street in medieval times, it formed a direct north–south artery between the Cathedral of St. Mungo (later Glasgow Cathedral) in the north, to Glasgow Cross and the banks of the River Clyde. The High Street now stops at Glasgow Cross, with the southern continuation being the Saltmarket. High Street forms the notional boundary between the city centre to the west, and Dennistoun and Calton to the east.

== History ==
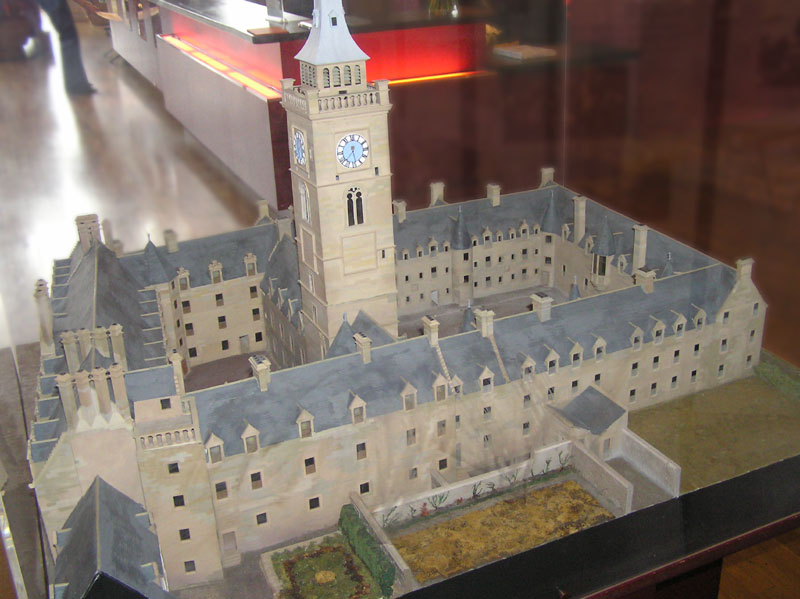
Model of the original University of Glasgow buildings on display at the Hunterian Museum

In 1246 the Dominican Order established a friary on the east side of the street, hence the existence of Blackfriars' Street. From 1460 to 1870, the original buildings of the University of Glasgow were located on the eastside of High Street between Blackfriars Road and Duke Street, before moving to Hillhead in the West End. After relocation, the college site was acquired by the City of Glasgow Union Railway which turned it into the College Goods yard. The goods yard was closed in 1968 as part of the Beeching Axe. One surviving wall of the goods warehouse on Duke Street was incorporated into the Collegelands development.

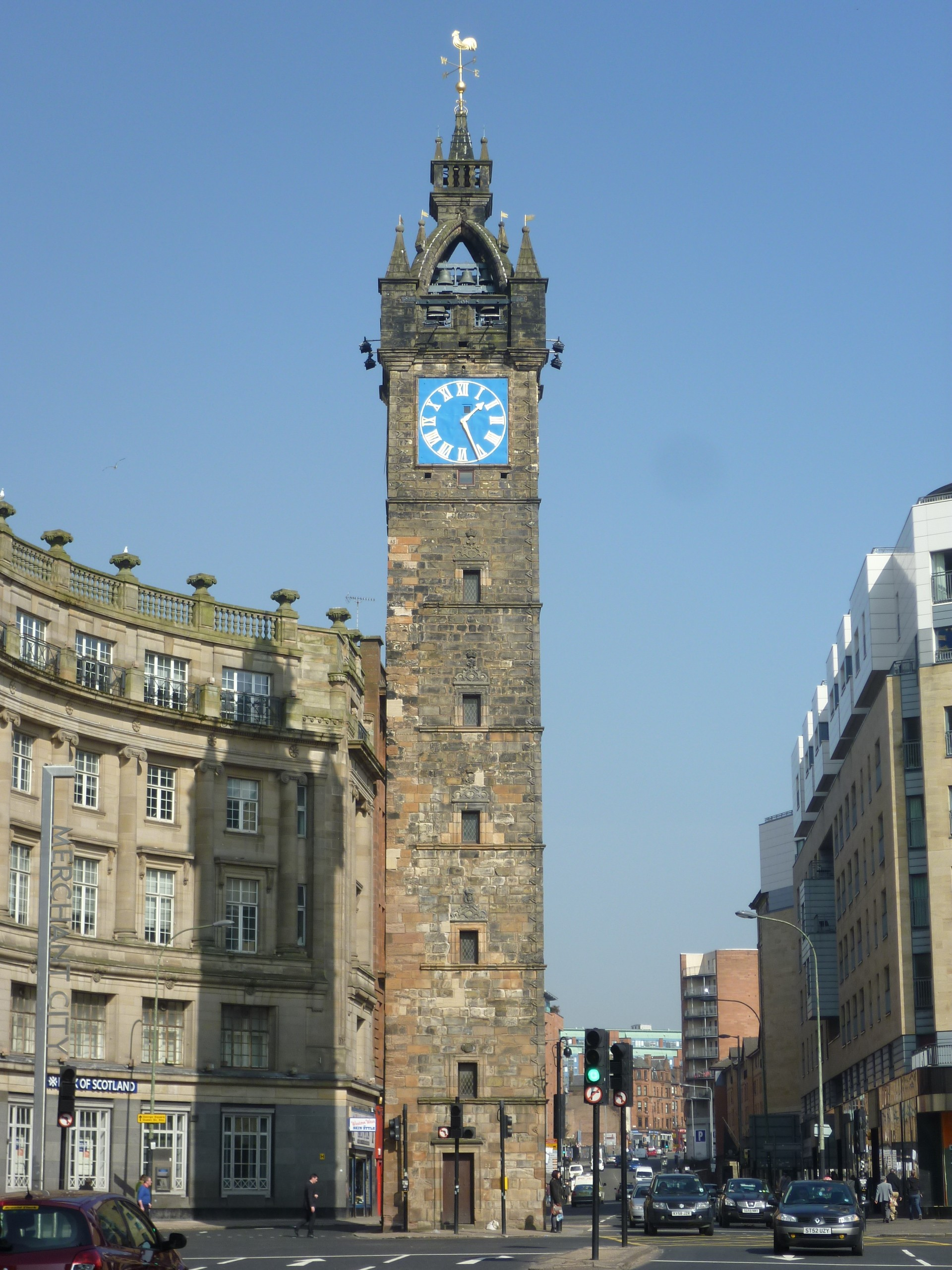
The steeple of the old Tolbooth stands at the southern end of the street.

When the Industrial Revolution in Victorian times triggered the massive growth in Glasgow's size, the importance of High Street diminished as the administrative functions of the city moved westward into what is now known as the Merchant City area, whilst the medieval part of the city was left behind. The original City Chambers at the foot of High Street was closed and moved to the present building which stands overlooking George Square in the late 19th century.

As the 20th century progressed, many areas of High Street fell into dereliction. However, in the early 21st century, the fortunes of High Street have enjoyed a renaissance with Glasgow's growing economy. Some developers have created upmarket apartment buildings and there are plans to develop empty sites into new student residences for the adjacent University of Strathclyde.

== Transport ==
High Street railway station is located on High Street, on the North Clyde Line. The lands around the station have been developed into a hotel, and another scheme called Seventeen Acres is awaiting funding. The railway station itself will be substantially remodelled if the Glasgow Crossrail scheme is approved by the Scottish Government.
