= Ruchill Park =

Public park in Glasgow, Scotland

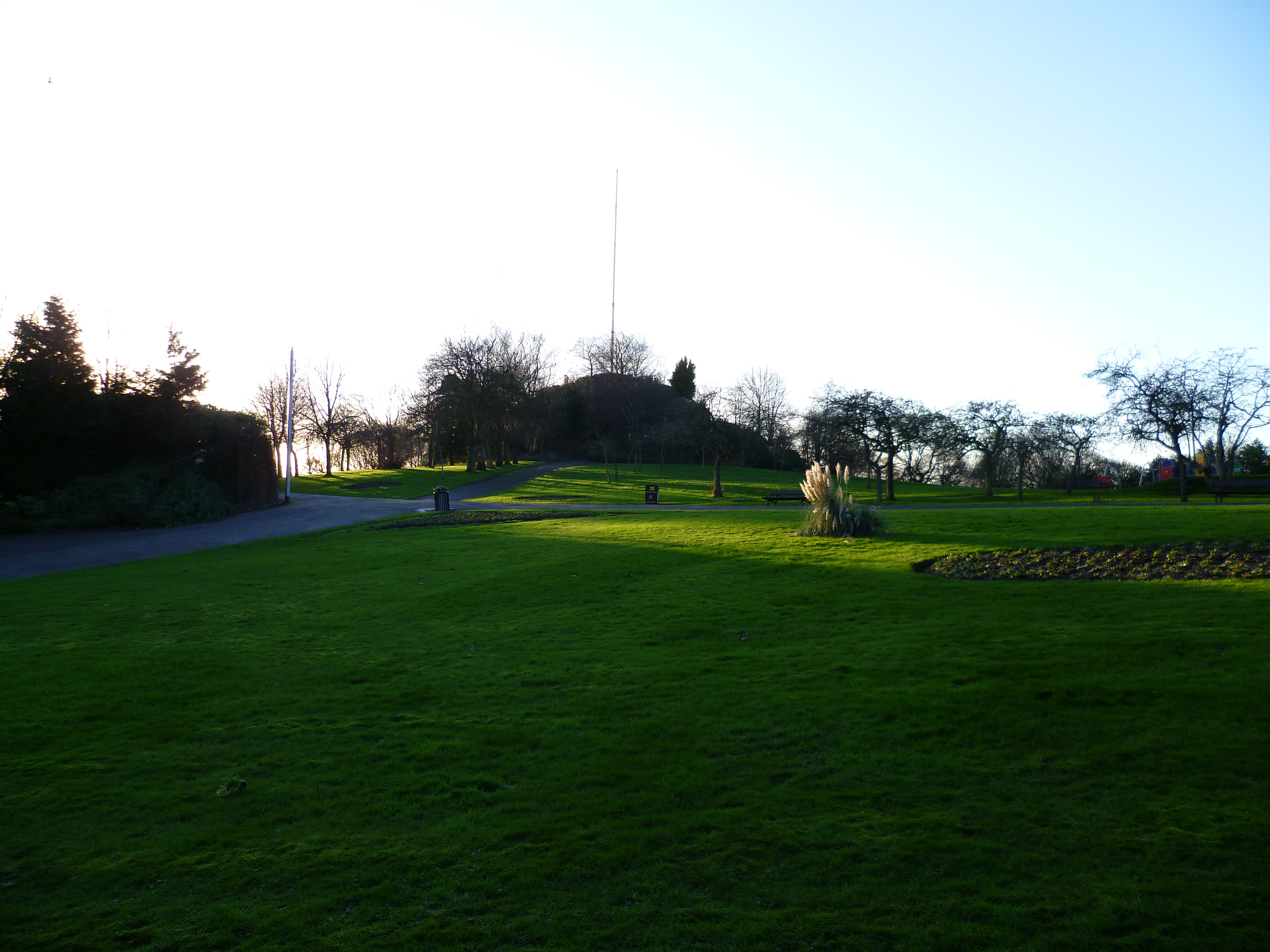
- Type: Public park
- Location: Glasgow, Scotland
- OS grid: NS5784168095
- Coordinates: 55.88502°N 4.27306°W
- Area: 21 hectares (53 acres)
- Created: 1892
- Operated by: Glasgow City Council

Ruchill Park is a public park in Ruchill, Glasgow, Scotland, approximately 2 miles (3 km) north-west of the city centre. It is adjacent to the former location of Ruchill Hospital on Bilsland Drive.

== History ==
In 1892, Glasgow Corporation acquired the site of Ruchill Park for the construction of Ruchill Hospital.

== Facilities ==
Ruchill Park has a wide range of facilities, including:

- Jogging trails
- Play areas
- Flowerbeds
- Conservation areas
- Disc golf (12 hole course)

As well as this, the park features a small hillock with a flagpole (lit when it is dark) which has one of the best possible viewpoints of the whole city and surrounding area.

== Events ==
Each Saturday at 9:30am the park hosts Ruchill parkrun, a free weekly 5 km (3.1 mi) run
