= Merchant City =

Coordinates: 55.8568°N 4.2462°W

Merchant City: Scots: Merchand Ceity
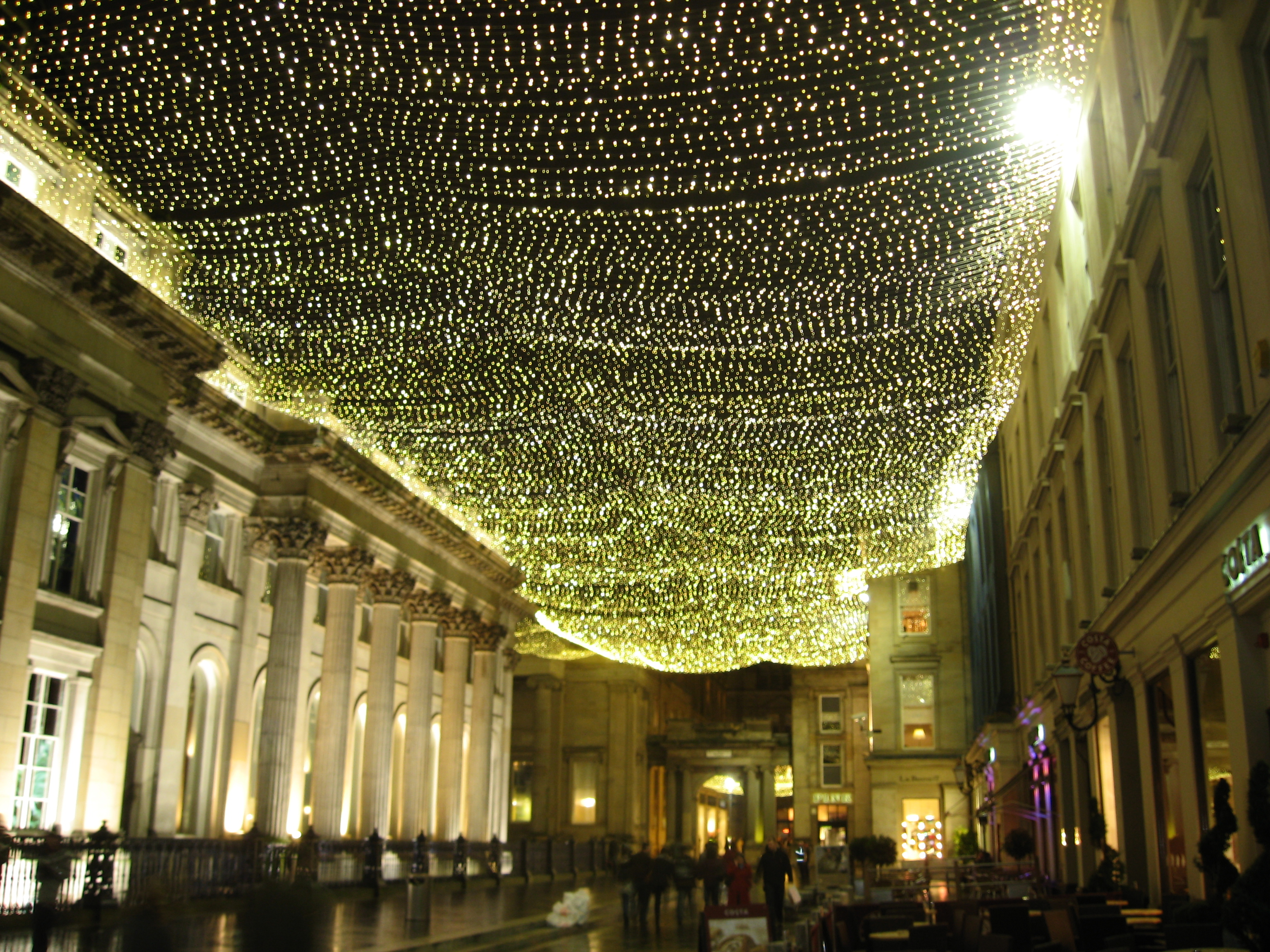
- The Merchant City at night

- Location within Glasgow
- OS grid reference: NS595649
  - Edinburgh: 47 miles (76 km)
- Council area: Glasgow City Council
- Lieutenancy area: Glasgow
- Country: Scotland
- Sovereign state: United Kingdom
- Post town: GLASGOW
- Postcode district: G1
- Dialling code: 0141
- Police: Scotland
- Fire: Scottish
- Ambulance: Scottish
- UK Parliament: Glasgow Central
- Scottish Parliament: Glasgow Kelvin

The Merchant City, a new name introduced through urban renewal by the Scottish Development Agency and the city council in the 1980s is one part of the metropolitan central area of Glasgow. It commences at George Square and goes eastwards reaching Glasgow Cross, in the centre of Glasgow, Scotland. The eastern fringe of the Merchant City contains part of Glasgow's original medieval street plan, which stretches northwards towards neighbouring Townhead.

It contains offices, flats, retail shops, restaurants, and bars. Part of the campus of the University of Strathclyde occupies the area. The Merchant City is home to several repurposed buildings including the City Halls & Old Fruitmarket, Merchant Square, and the Scottish Youth Theatre. It hosts many annual festivals.

The approximate definition of the Merchant City is the area defined by George Street to the north, High Street to the east, Trongate to the south, and Queen Street to the west.

== History ==
The medieval Glasgow Cross continues at the junction of High Street, Trongate and Saltmarket. The town's tron, weighing scales, was placed next to the steeple of the town house in the 1550s. The Tron Steeple, as it became known, still stands at Glasgow Cross, one of the few remaining pre-Victorian buildings in Glasgow.

The area now known as 'Merchant City' was developed from the 1750s onwards. It also includes St Andrew's Square, adjacent to Glasgow Green. Residences and warehouses of the wealthy merchant "tobacco lords" were built in the area. The district west of the congested High Street became the ancient burgh's first planned New Town, with wide, straight streets, vistas, churches and squares, marking the start of aspirational residential movements westwards. That movement would continue with new names over two centuries, including, from 1800, the creation of a second New Town, being Blythswood upon Blythswood Hill, west of the new Buchanan Street, rising to Blythswood Square. and beyond.

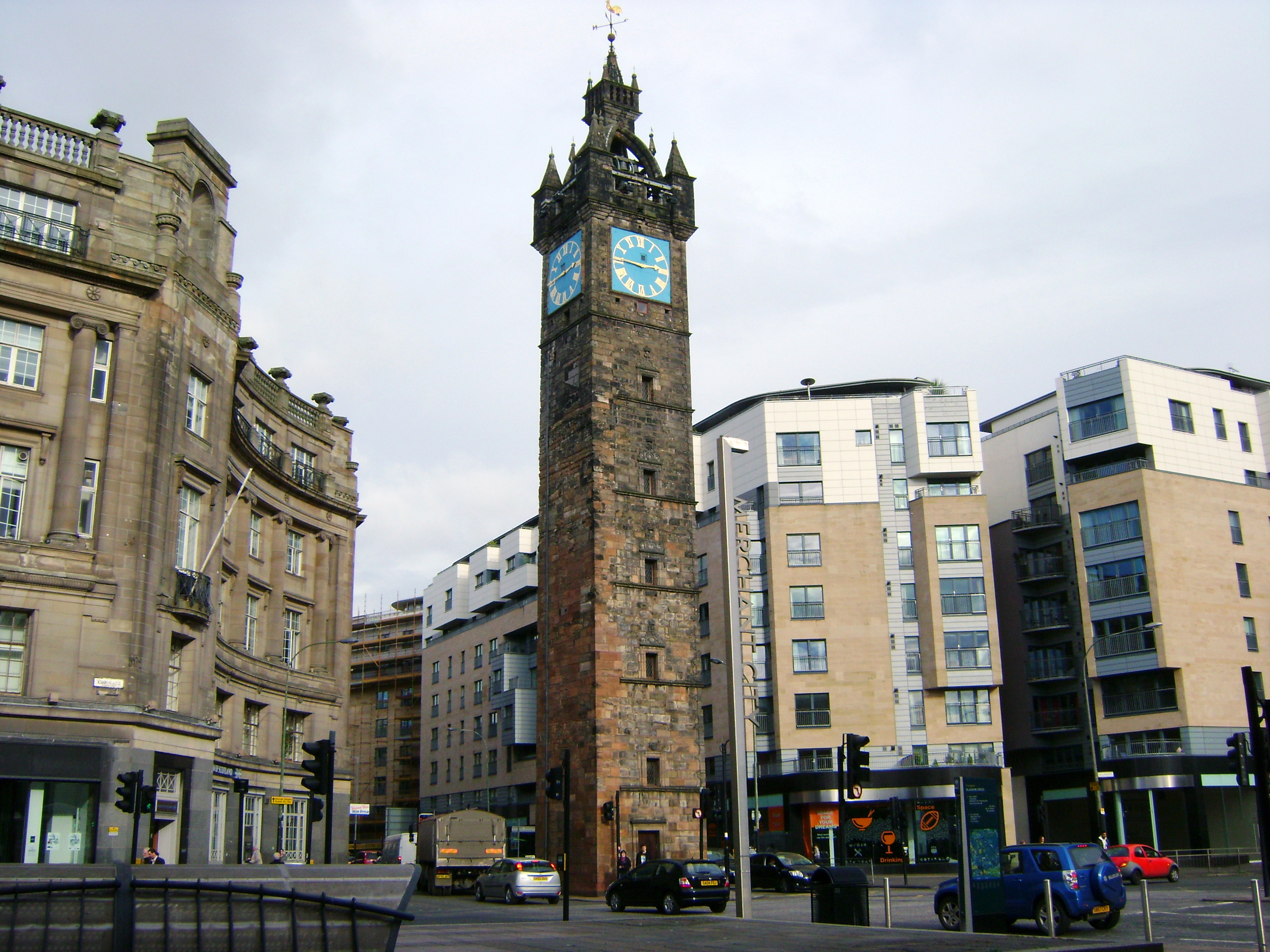
Tolbooth Steeple.

As Glasgow expanded in the 19th century to become the second city of the United Kingdom and the British Empire, the old area became principally a centre of major warehouses, shipping companies, offices, distilleries and clothing manufacturers; while the markets continued in fruit, vegetables, cheese and fish. The more prosperous people moved out and set up home in the larger New Town of Blythswood.

After plans to construct the M8/M74 motorway ring road around the city centre were published in the 1960s much of the area fell into decline, with some of the buildings compulsorily purchased by the city council to allow for their demolition ahead of the new road. The central food markets moved to modern premises further east of the city centre. At the same time the vast number of wholesale and manufacturing warehouses declined, largely because of the national ending of Retail Price Maintenance, and the continuing movement to out of town industrial estates. However the High Street motorway road was never built and in the 1980s the decision was taken by the city council and the Scottish Development Agency to revitalise the area and its historic buildings with public and private investment in its improvements and new uses.

The name "Merchant City" was coined by historian and writer Charles Oakley in the 1960s, ahead of this regeneration.

The Merchant City has been promoted and built up in recent years as a residential, shopping and leisure area, mirroring Covent Garden in the West End of London. To this end many new bars and restaurants have been established. This has been complemented with the building of prestigious new housing developments, often by restoring Victorian buildings. A later example being the GPO Building development in George Square.

Another important element of the area's transformation is high-end shopping, anchored by the Italian Centre designed by Page\Park Architects who are fond of including art in their architecture. Here the art is integral to the façades, but also features in the courtyard including a sculpture, 'Thinking of Bella' (1994) by Shona Kinloch.

The University of Strathclyde (which evolved from the Royal College of Science and Technology in the 1960s) has long had a presence in the area with several academic buildings along its northern fringe. It has owned the Ramshorn Cemetery and Church since 1983 and has used the latter as a theatre, with the most recent addition being the adjacent Technology and Innovation Centre (TIC) completed in 2014 and has regenerated much of the area between Ingram Street and George Street.

== Festivals ==
Merchant is famous for their annual festivals. Merchant city festivals have a lot of different entertainments, including street arts, dance, live music, markets, fashion and design, comedy, family events, tours, heritage walks, talks, visual art, film, and children - families activities every year. Merchant City Festival 2017 was held on 22–30 July 2017. It included two great family events as Carnival Procession and Provand’s Lordship free Family Fun Zone. Among the highlights of the festival are carnival procession from Glasgow Cathedral, massed samba bands, a UNESCO music stage, the return of SURGE, the festival within a festival, a Street band “Encontro” and a celebration of street food. During the festival, the city hosted Hip Replacement, a family Dance-along screening of Moana and Indiana Jones, and the hugely popular live sing-a-long Massaoke.

== Transport ==
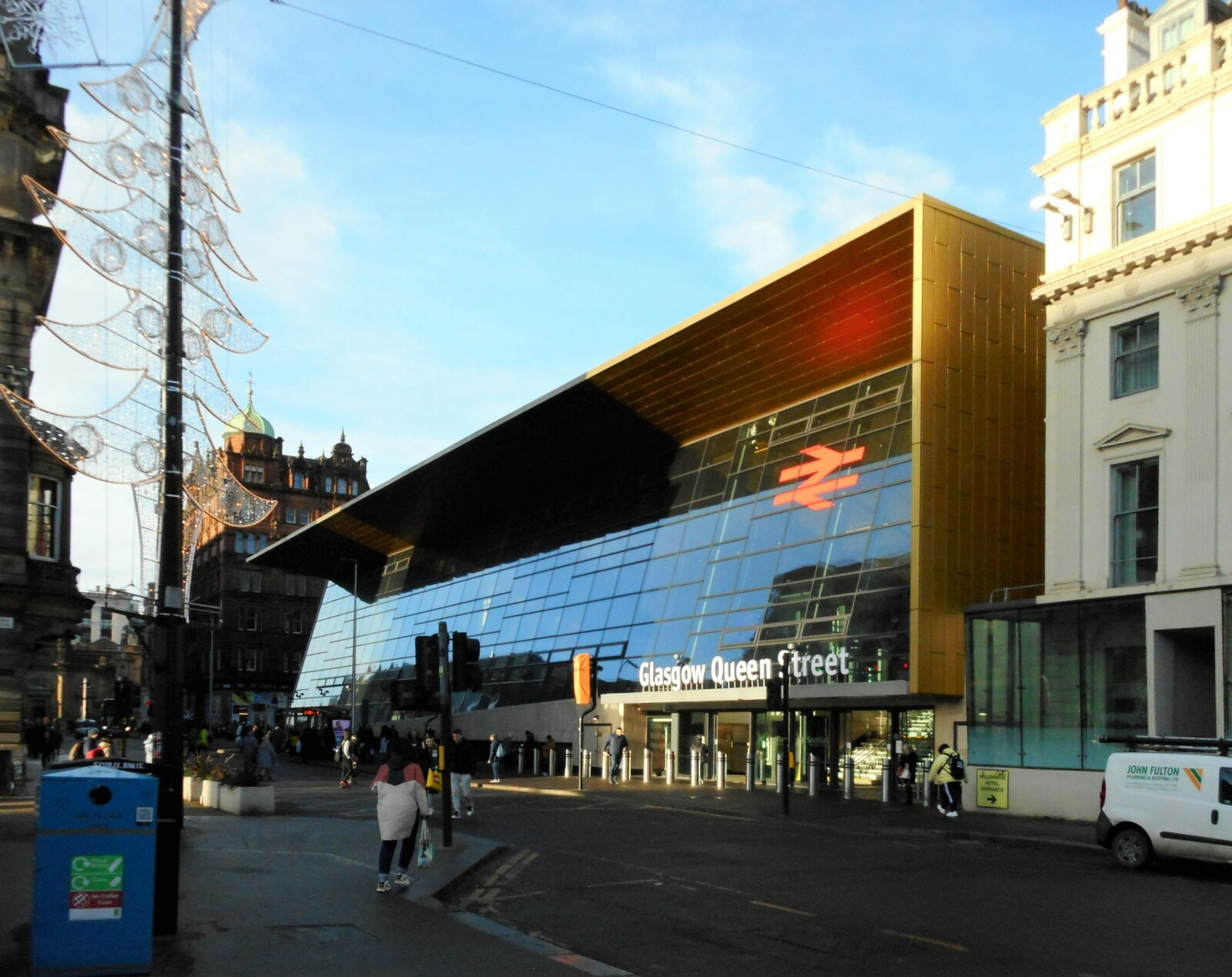
Queen Street Station

The Merchant City area is primarily served by Queen Street and High Street railway stations on the suburban network. Buchanan Street Station on the Glasgow Subway is also a short walk from the area.
