= Trongate =

Street in Glasgow

Coordinates: 55.85712°N 4.24577°W

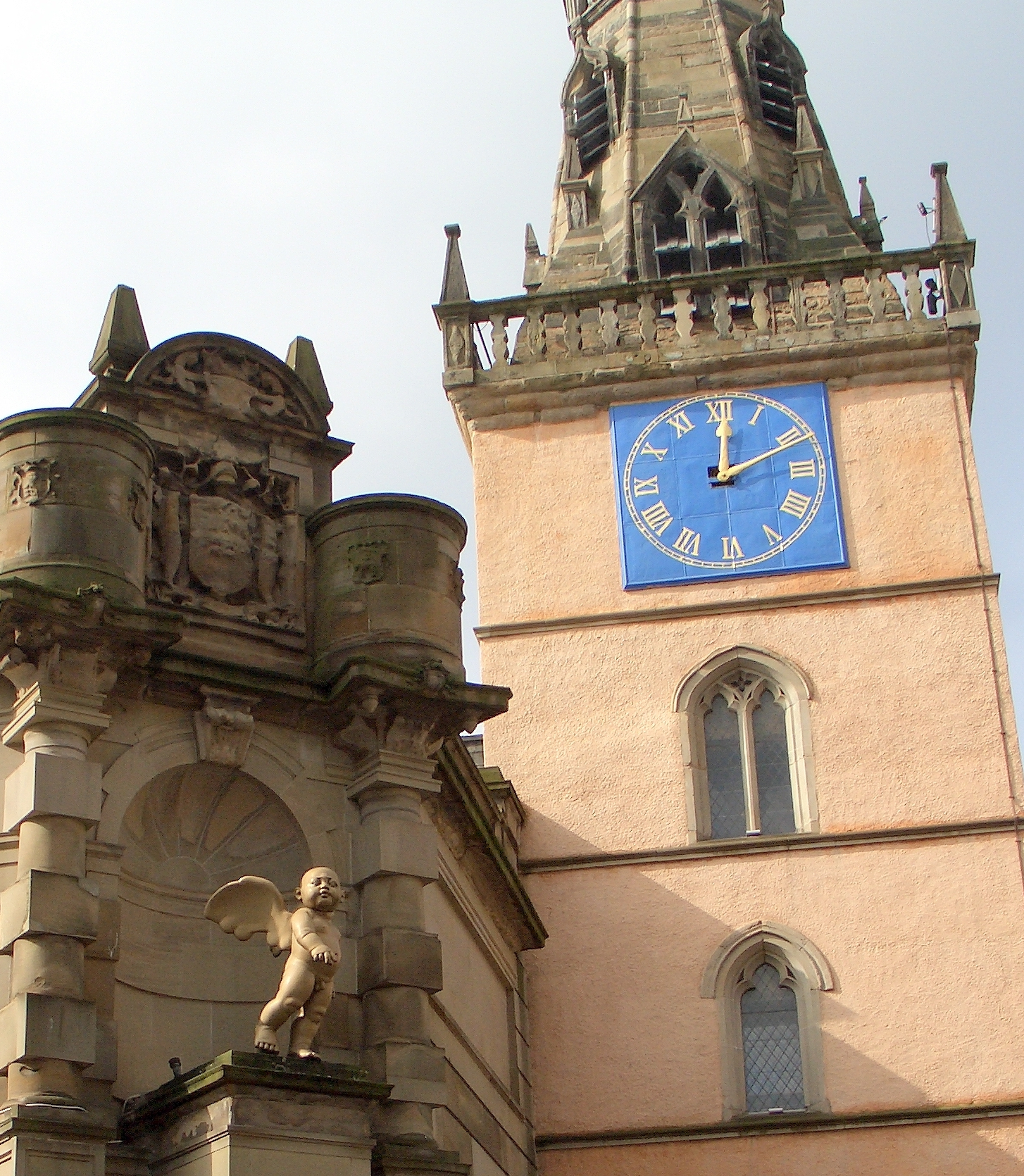
The corner of the Tron Gate Theatre

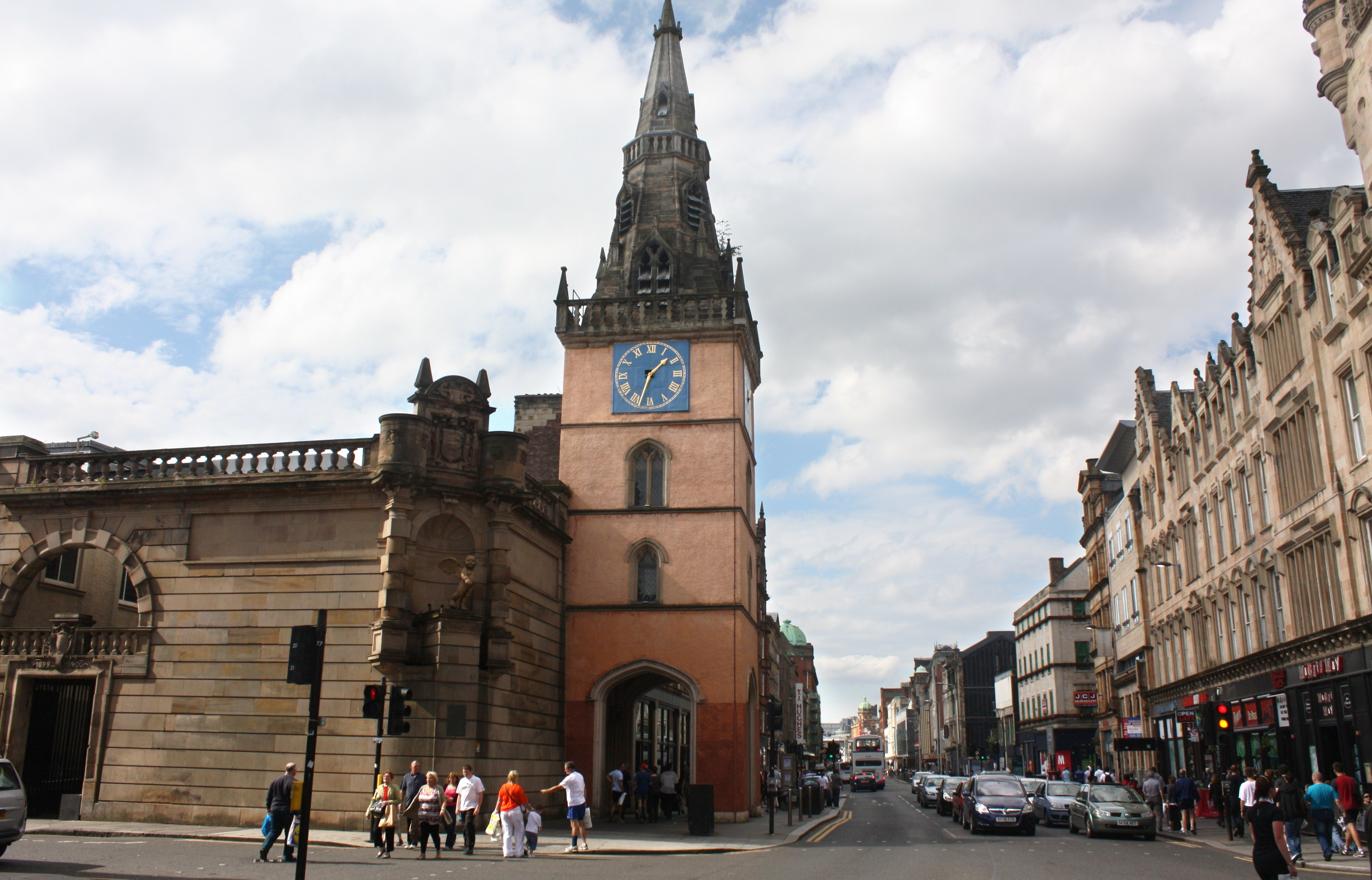
Trongate with Tron kirk steeple on left, viewing west

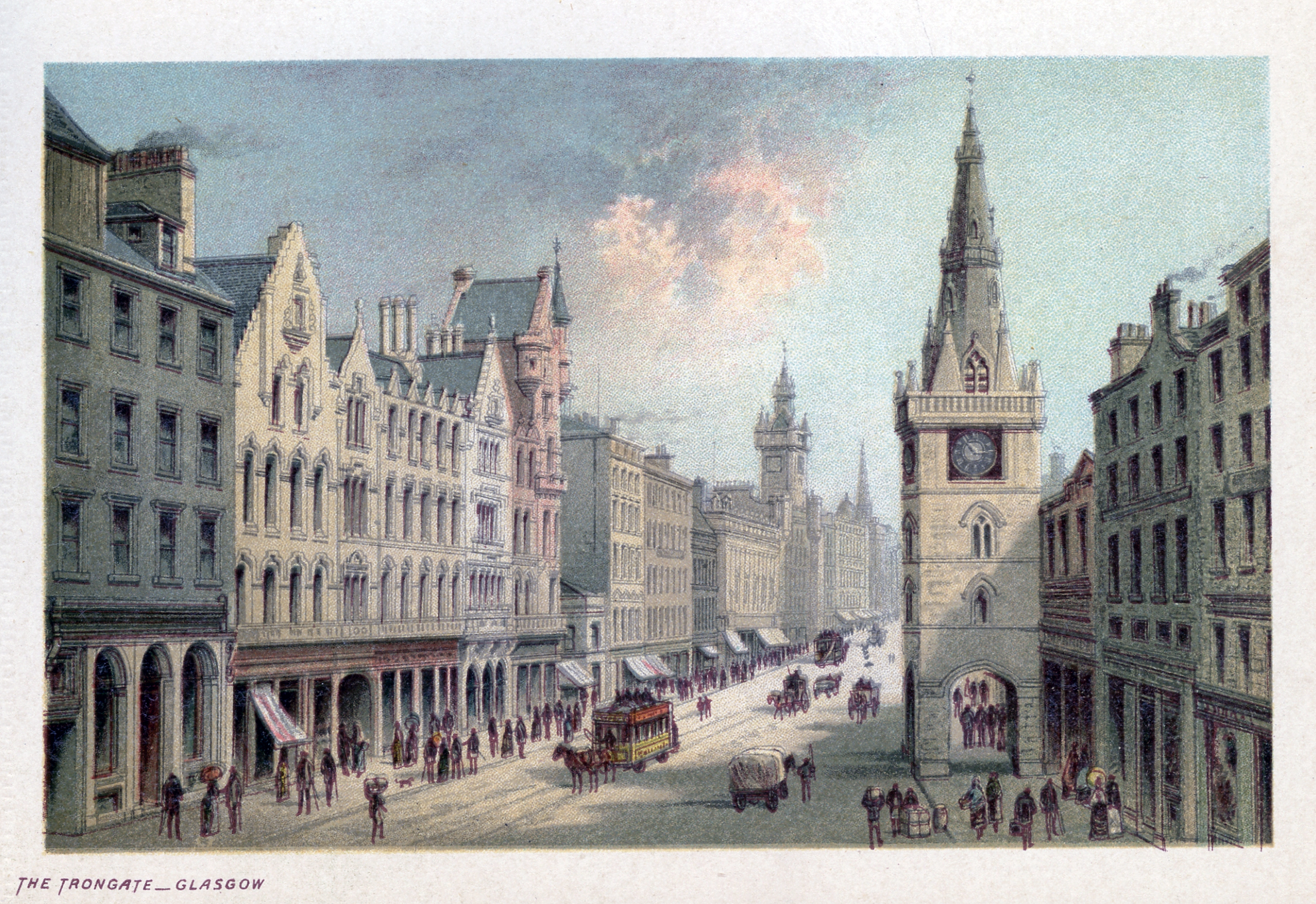
The Trongate 1889

Trongate is one of the oldest streets in the city of Glasgow, Scotland. Trongate begins at Glasgow Cross, where the steeple of the old Glasgow Tolbooth is situated, being the original centre of medieval Glasgow, and goes westward changing its name to Argyle Street at Glassford Street. In modern times, it forms the notional southern boundary of the Merchant City area.

== History ==
Previously known as St Thenew's Gait (the way to the supposed site of St Thenew's burial) it was around the start of the 1500s that the name Trongate first began to be used. The name comes by virtue of a weighbeam erected in the mid-16th century, used for all goods requiring to be weighed for duty reasons, including from early shipping on the Clyde. Tron is a Scots word of Norman origin for weighing scales.

Trongate, looking east from Argyle Street

The Trongate was one of the areas which was affected by a large fire on 17 June 1652 which destroyed a third of the town and left around 1,000 families homeless. The fire also affected the areas of Saltmarket and Gallowgate.

The Tron church was founded as the Collegiate Church of Our Lady and St Anne in 1525 by James Houston. It became a Protestant church after the Reformation and the tower was added in the late 16th century. The steeple was added in 1628. Most of the building was destroyed by a fire in 1793, only the tower surviving. The current church was built in 1794, separately from the tower. It was substantially redeveloped in the 1980s as the Tron Theatre.

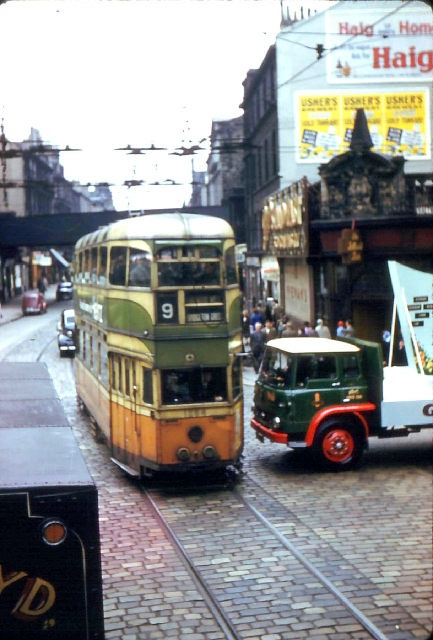
Glasgow Tram on Trongate at Glasgow Cross in June 1962

Trongate was used as a route for the trams of Glasgow Corporation Tramways until this system was abandoned in 1962. The tramlines were subsequently removed. Glasgow Cross railway station was situated at the eastern end of the street between 1895 and 1964 (the tracks – part of the extant Argyle Line – and parts of the station are still present below ground). The Trongate remains a major bus corridor for services travelling to and from the east and south-eastern parts of the city (largely along the old tram routes), which use the one-way systems on the Gallowgate and London Road but merge at Glasgow Cross.
