= Union Street fire =

Building fire in Glasgow, Scotland

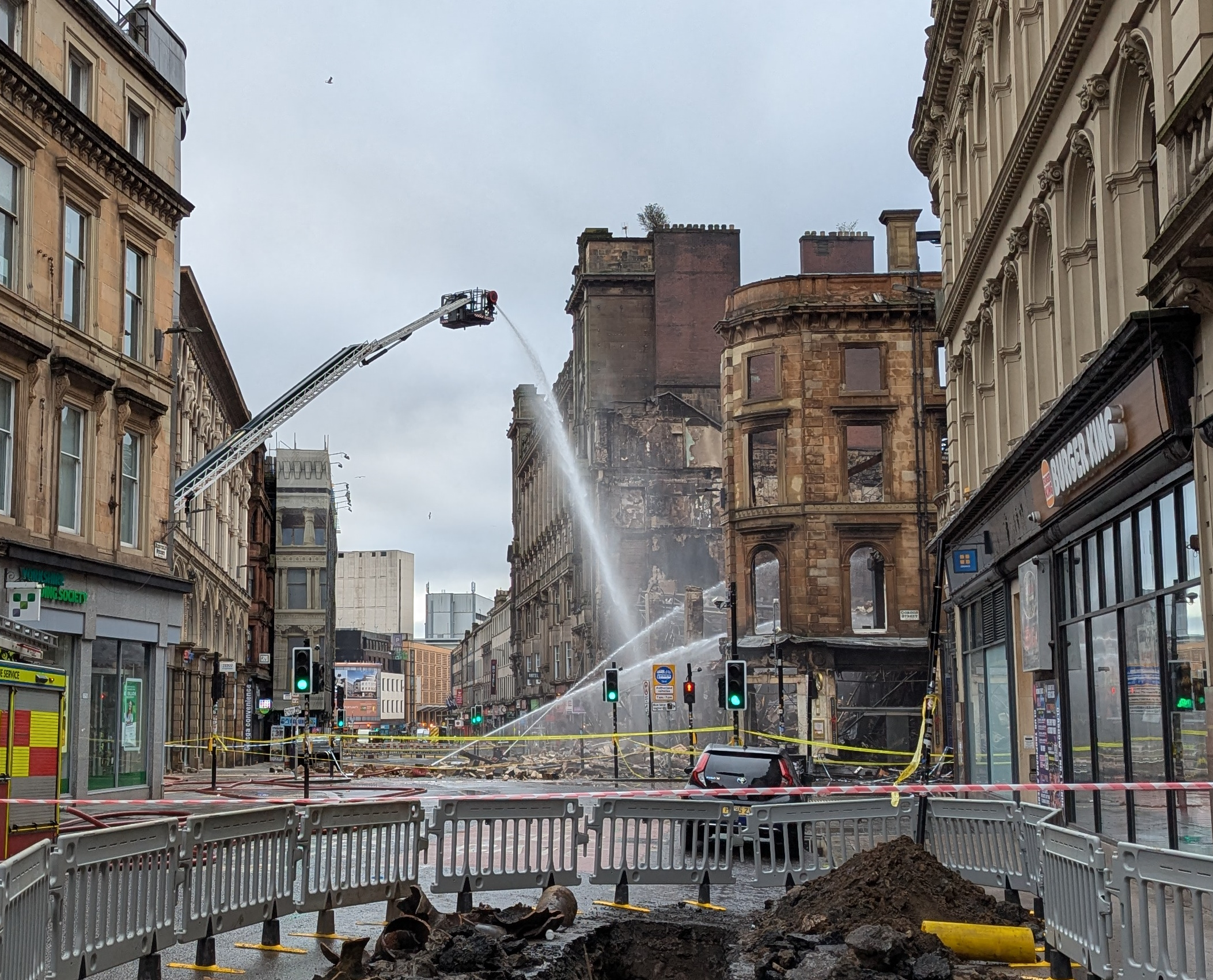
- Union Corner two days after the fire began, mostly collapsed and still being doused with water
- Location of fire on Union Street and Glasgow Central railway station
- Date: 8 March 2026 (6 months ago)
- Time: 15:40 (GMT; UTC)
- Duration: 4 days
- Location: Union Street at Gordon Street, Glasgow, Scotland; 55.8603233°N 4.25720010°W
- Cause: Investigations ongoing, initial reports speculating lithium battery fire
- Outcome: Full demolition of Union Corner
- Deaths: 0
- Injuries: 0
- Property damage: Partial collapse of Union Corner, multiple businesses affected

On 8 March 2026, a major fire broke out in a vape shop in Union Corner, a B-listed five-storey building on the corner of Union Street and Gordon Street in Glasgow, Scotland, directly attached to Glasgow Central railway station. The fire led to Union Corner's partial collapse and severely disrupted rail service at the station, which is the busiest in Scotland, for several weeks. More than 250 firefighters were on the scene at the peak. Firefighters remained on the scene until 11 March.

On 12 March, the remains of the building were handed over to Glasgow City Council from the Scottish Fire and Rescue Service, four days following the outbreak of the fire. Glasgow City Council officials confirmed that following a structural assessment, the remaining part of the building would be demolished in the interest of public safety.

Glasgow Central's low-level services re-opened on 11 March and some high-level platforms re-opened on 18 March. On 25 March, All platforms resuming services, and the Gordon Street entrance, Union Street entrance and entire station concourse was reopened on 17 July, though some retail units remain temporarily closed.

== Background ==
Union Corner was built in 1851 for Orr and Sons, and was designed by James Brown of Brown and Carrick. It became a Category B listed building in 1988. Central Station was opened adjoining the building on two sides in 1879, and is Category A listed.

The building contained dozens of businesses, including the Blue Lagoon chip shop, a coffee shop, vape shop, nail studio, hairdressers, tattoo studio, Shelter Scotland charity shop, and a Subway restaurant.

It is alleged that the vape shop where the fire appears to have broken out was not properly licensed to sell vapes or tobacco products.

== Fire ==
=== Outbreak ===
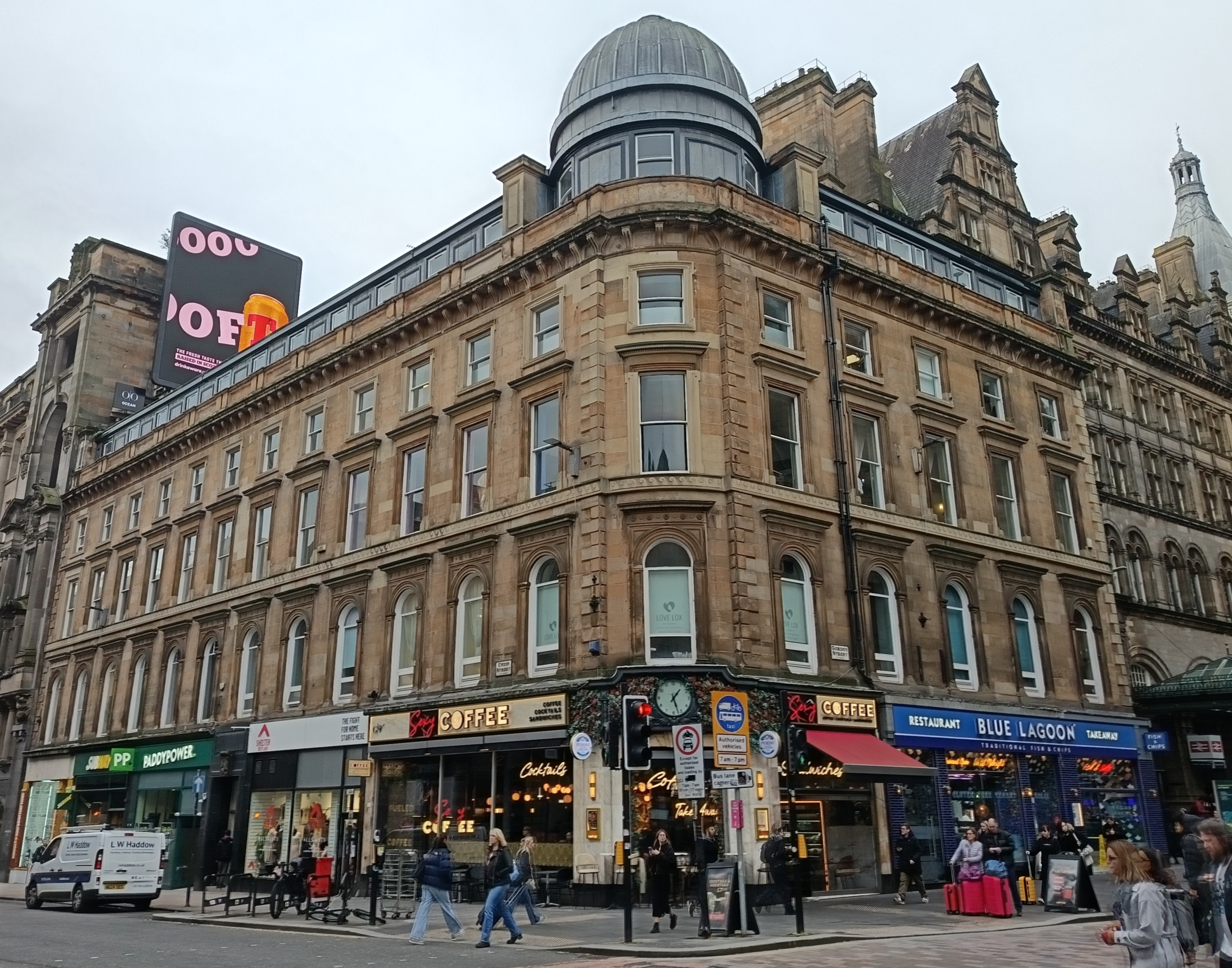
Union Corner seen in October 2024. The source of the fire was in the furthest left shop, to the left of Subway

At around 15:40 UTC on 8 March 2026, emergency services were called to a fire at the Union Corner building at the junction of Union Street and Gordon Street in central Glasgow, directly beside Glasgow Central Station. Witnesses reported hearing an explosion from a ground-floor vape shop shortly before flames and thick smoke began pouring from the building. Police quickly began clearing pedestrians from the area while nearby businesses and parts of the station surroundings were evacuated as a precaution.

Within the hour, the Scottish Fire and Rescue Service had deployed multiple appliances to the scene as the fire rapidly spread through the Victorian building’s interior. Flames began breaking through windows on the upper floors as smoke drifted across the city centre. Roads around Union Street and Gordon Street were closed, and rail services at Glasgow Central Station’s high-level platforms were suspended due to the proximity of the blaze.

=== Escalation ===
Going into the evening, the scale of the incident escalated significantly as the fire intensified. More than 200 firefighters were eventually deployed, using aerial ladder platforms and hoses from surrounding streets to battle the flames. During the height of the blaze the building’s distinctive corner dome collapsed and parts of the structure began to give way, while a large digital advertising screen attached to the building also fell as the fire weakened the façade.

Firefighters had begun to bring the blaze under greater control after several hours of intense firefighting. Crews continued directing water onto the upper floors and roof to prevent further collapse and stop the fire spreading to nearby buildings, including the Grand Central Hotel and Glasgow Central Station. Police maintained a large cordon around the area while rail services remained disrupted across parts of the network.

By 22:00 UTC, the fire had largely been contained, though firefighters remained on site throughout the night tackling hotspots and monitoring the stability of the heavily damaged structure. The Union Corner building was left severely gutted and structurally compromised, with much of the roof and upper floors destroyed. Investigators later began examining the site to determine the exact cause of the blaze, which was believed to have originated in the ground-floor vape shop.

=== Aftermath ===
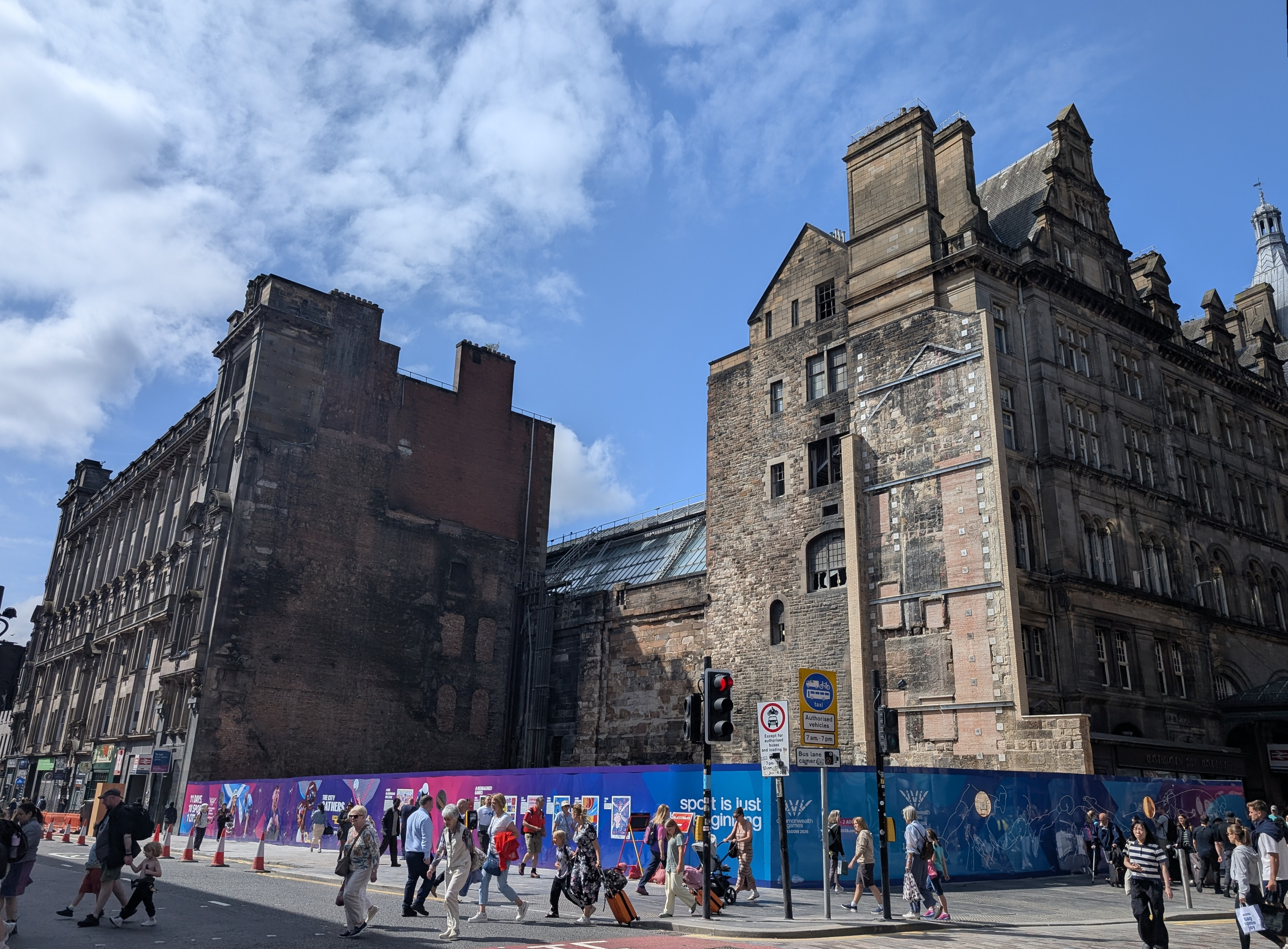
The site of Union Corner in July 2026, 4 months after the fire

==== Union Corner ====
The Union Corner building housed a number of independent businesses that were destroyed or severely affected by the fire. These included retail and service premises. Several business owners said they were “heartbroken” by the loss of their premises, with studios, equipment and years of work destroyed when the blaze engulfed the building. Some operators reported the loss of significant specialist equipment and artwork, while others said they had been left without a workplace and with uncertainty over when they might be able to reopen. Fundraising efforts were launched in the days following the fire, raising more than £150,000 to help affected businesses cope with the financial impact while longer-term recovery plans for the site were considered.

In the days following the fire pieces of the building continued to collapse.

On 12 March, Glasgow City Council announced that the remainder of Union Corner would be demolished due to safety issues. They stated "we are now in control of the Union Street site, and after a full and final assessment of the remaining structure, our Building Standards team have decided that demolition must happen in the interests of public safety". Demolition works began on 13 March,, and works were carried out using hand tools to avoid potential damage to neigbouring buildings. Demolition works completed on 20 March.

==== Impact on transport ====
Glasgow Central Station was fully closed after the fire, due to the risk of the neighbouring fire-damaged facade collapsing. West Coast Main Line trains did not travel further north than Motherwell. Low-level trains continued to pass through the underground parts of the station without stopping, instead stopping at nearby Anderston and Argyle Street. Trains on most connected lines were fully cancelled, with no replacement buses. TransPennine Express also cancelled their service to and from Liverpool along with Manchester Airport service.

The low-level section of the station reopened on 11 March. Some of the main high-level platforms re-opened on 18 March, but the main shops, toilets, and other platforms remained closed. The high-level Hope Street exit re-opened as an exit only for some platforms on 22 March. The rest of the platforms, alongside most of the station facilities, re-opened on 25 March, although with the Union Street and Gordon Street exits still part of an "exclusion zone". Glasgow City Council announced on 24 April that the exclusion zone, including both Union Street and Gordon Street exits of the station, would not re-open until July.

A number of streets were closed, including Union Street itself, a major drop-off point for many bus passengers. First, McGill's along with Stagecoach service suffered significant delays due to road closures in the area, with buses remaining diverted as of 25 March.

==== Other effects ====
Damage, mainly due to water ingress, appeared to have been contained to a small office on the Union Street side of the station and a small part of the glazed area directly above it.

The fire was a major event in the wider regeneration projects for Union Street, which also involved the compulsory purchase order of the long-unoccupied A-listed Egyptian Halls opposite the building.

== Reactions ==
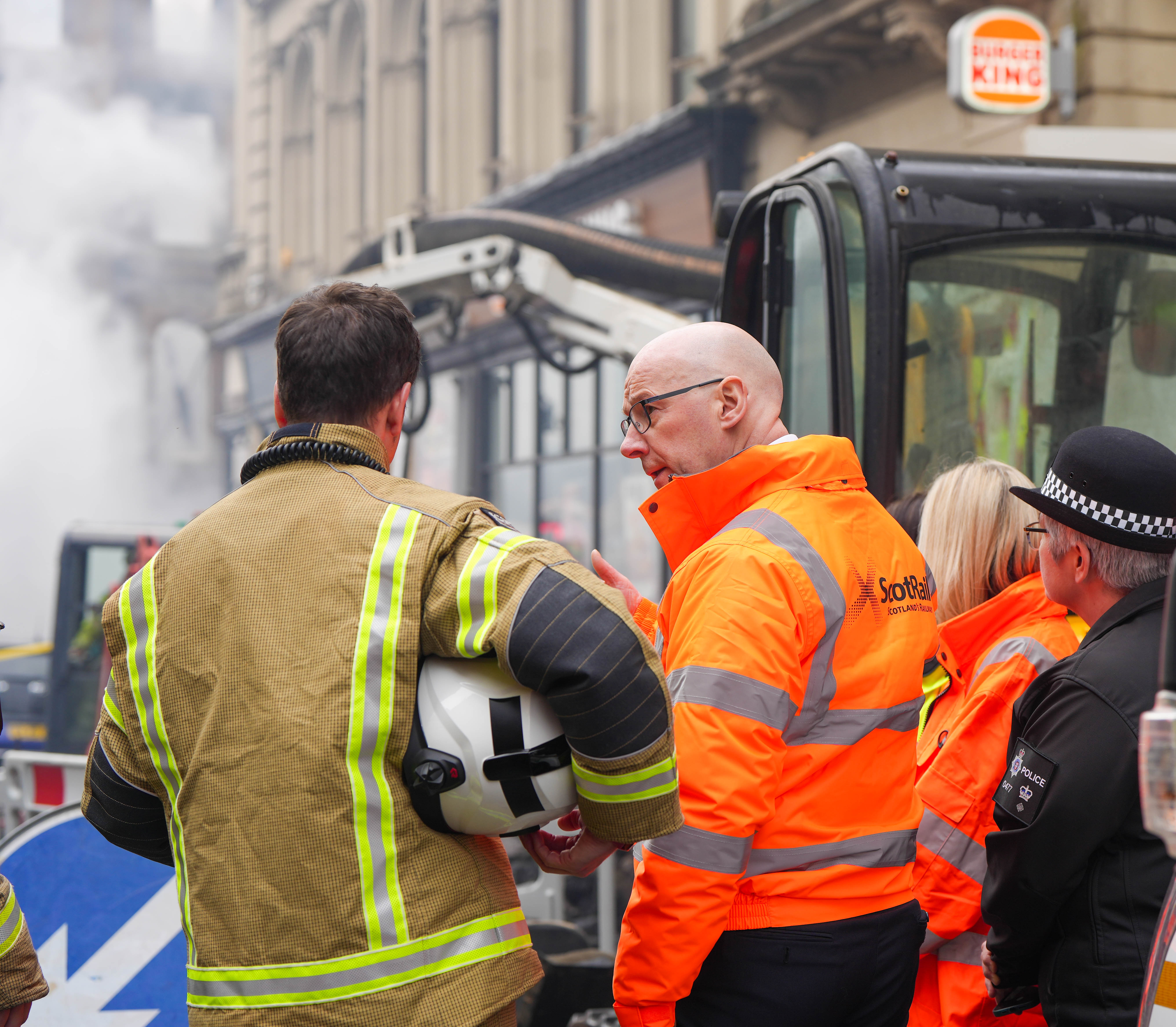
First Minister John Swinney visits the site on 9 March

The fire prompted responses from political leaders across Scotland. First Minister John Swinney said the incident was a serious event in the centre of Glasgow and thanked the emergency services for their response. He stated that the Scottish Government would work with partners including Glasgow City Council and Network Rail to support recovery efforts and assist businesses affected by the destruction of the building. Swinney also indicated that rebuilding and restoration of the site would be considered as part of the longer-term response to the fire.

Anas Sarwar, leader of Scottish Labour, said he was "heartbroken" by the destruction caused by the fire and its impact on businesses and workers in the area.

Paul Sweeney, a Glasgow region MSP for Scottish Labour, also commented on the loss of the Union Corner building. Sweeney, who has previously campaigned on heritage issues in the city, said the destruction of the structure represented a significant loss to Glasgow's built environment. He called for consideration to be given to rebuilding the corner structure as part of any future redevelopment of the site near Glasgow Central Station.

Senior fire officer David Farries and council leader Susan Aitken both credited firefighters with preventing the fire spreading to the station and Grand Central Hotel.

== See also ==
- Cheapside Street whisky bond fire, 1960
- James Watt Street fire, 1968
- Kilbirnie Street fire, 1972
- Glasgow School of Art, another historic building in Glasgow that was mostly destroyed by two fires in 2014 and 2018
