= Blue Lagoon =

Blue Lagoon may refer to:

== Arts and entertainment ==
- The Blue Lagoon (novel), a 1908 novel by Henry De Vere Stacpoole
  - The Blue Lagoon (1923 film), a lost British-South African silent film, based on the novel, starring Molly Adair and Arthur Pusey
  - The Blue Lagoon (1949 film), a British film, based on the novel, starring Jean Simmons and Donald Houston
  - The Blue Lagoon (1980 film), an American-Australian film, based on the novel, starring Brooke Shields and Christopher Atkins
    - Return to the Blue Lagoon, a 1991 sequel of the 1980 film
    - Blue Lagoon: The Awakening, a 2012 Lifetime television movie

== Places ==
- Blue Lagoon, Queensland, Australia, a geographical feature on Lizard Island
- Blue Lagoon, a flooded slate quarry near Abereiddy, Wales
- Blue Lagoon, a cove in Portland, Jamaica
- Blue Lagoon (Ekerö), an artificial lake in Sweden
- Blue Lagoon (geothermal spa), Iceland
- Blue Lagoon Bay, near Comino, Malta
- Blue Lagoon Island, near Nassau, Bahamas
- Blue Lagoon Local Nature Reserve, Bletchley, Milton Keynes, England
- Blue Lagoon National Park, Zambia
- Blue Lagoon Reservoir or Ward's Reservoir, a reservoir near Belmont, Lancashire, England
- Ölüdeniz or Blue Lagoon, Turkey
- Harpur Hill Quarry, Derbyshire, England, known locally as the Blue Lagoon

== Other uses ==
- The Blue Lagoon, a restaurant at Disneyland Paris renamed Captain Jack's in 2017
- Blue Lagoon (cocktail), an alcoholic drink
- Blue Lagoon (restaurant chain), a Scottish restaurant chain
- Blue Lagoon, Queensland, a former outdoor water park area at Dreamworld in Gold Coast, Queensland, Australia
- Blue Lagoon Water Park, Pembrokeshire, an indoor water park in Pembrokeshire, Wales
- Princess Selandia or Blue Lagoon, a former floating nightclub in Barrow-in-Furness, United Kingdom

== See also ==
- Laguna Azul (disambiguation)
