= Keith Roma =

American firefighter and salvage corpsman (1974-2001)

- Roma's memorial outside 84 West Third Street
- Born: April 16, 1974; Staten Island, New York City, New York
- Died: September 11, 2001 (aged 27); Lower Manhattan
- Cause of death: Collapse of the North Tower during the September 11 attacks
- Employer: New York Fire Patrol

Keith Michael Roma (March 16, 1974 - September 11, 2001) was an American firefighter and salvage corpsman who was the only member of the New York Fire Patrol to die during the September 11 attacks. Roma's involvement and death in the September 11 attacks became the subject of controversy among firefighting circles following 9/11, as he was often excluded from remembrance ceremonies, memorials, and other official procedures, due to the fact he was not a direct member of the FDNY.

== Early life ==
Roma was born on April 16, 1974 in Staten Island, New York.

== Personal life ==
Roma was married to Arnie Roma, They had a daughter.

== Death ==
On September 11, 2001, Roma and New York Fire Patrol 2 arrived to World Trade Center where he was last seen in the lobby with Sgt. John Sheehan while evacuating the buildings, they were photographed by freelance photographer John Labriola, around at 10:28 am, the North tower collapses, Except Sheehan who survived the two building collapses. Roma perished in the attacks.

Roma's remain were recovered on December 24, 2001, He was found by the crews who located his helmet and body, which still standing upright, surrounded by the nine civilians he had been escorting to safety when the tower collapsed.
