= Salvage corps =

Salvage corps came into existence in the 19th century. With the growth of cities, fires and insurance, underwriters in several cities established fire fighting services to reduce losses. As municipal fire brigades became more competent in the 20th century, the private fire companies cut back their services and emphasised salvaging property after the regular firefighters had done their job.

Most were disbanded in the late 20th century and absorbed into the main fire departments/brigades. This included:

- Boston Protective Department (1859–1959)
- Glasgow Salvage Corps (November 1873–1 April 1984)
- Liverpool Salvage Corps (1842–1984)
- London Salvage Corps (1865–1982)
- New York Fire Patrol (1839–2006)
- Chicago Fire Insurance Patrol (1857–1959)
- Underwriters Salvage Corps (Mobile, Alabama)
- Underwriters Salvage Corps (Cincinnati, Ohio)
- Underwriters Salvage Corps (St Louis, Missouri) (1873–1955)
- Underwriters Fire Patrol (San Francisco, California) (1875–1943)
- Bombay Fire Salvage Corps (1907–present)

== History ==
=== British salvage corps ===
==== Cheapside Street whisky bond fire ====
On the 28th of March, 1960, a fire broke out on Cheapside Street. A million gallons of whisky in 21,000 wooden casks and 30,000 gallons of rum were housed in the building. Some of the wooden casks, under the heat of the fire, had ruptured which caused a massive liquid vapour explosion.

An AEC Mercury TL, which suffered immense damage when the building exploded. It is presumed that it had caught fire right after the explosion.

The explosion ripped apart the front & rear walls of the building, causing massive amounts of brickwork to collapse into Cheapside Street & Warrock Street. Sadly, the impact instantly killed 3 Fire Men in the explosion because of the flying bricks and a further 11 at the rear of the building in Warrock Street who were buried in the rubble, so with three Fire Appliances. In the end, the devastating building fire claimed 5 men from Glasgow Salvage Corps and 14 men from Glasgow Fire Service.

In the end, the following from Glasgow Salvage Corps had died:

- Salvageman Gordon McMillan
- Salvageman William Oliver
- Salvageman James Mungall
- Leading Salvageman James McLellan
- Superintendent Edward Murray.

=== Ranks ===
Title	Chief Officer	Deputy Chief Officer	Superintendent	Deputy Superintendent	Station Officer	Sub-Officer	Leading Salvage Man	Salvage Man
London Salvage Corps								
Liverpool Salvage Corps							N/A	
Glasgow Salvage Corps								
