= Glasgow Salvage Corps =

Fire safety service in Scotland, 1873–1984

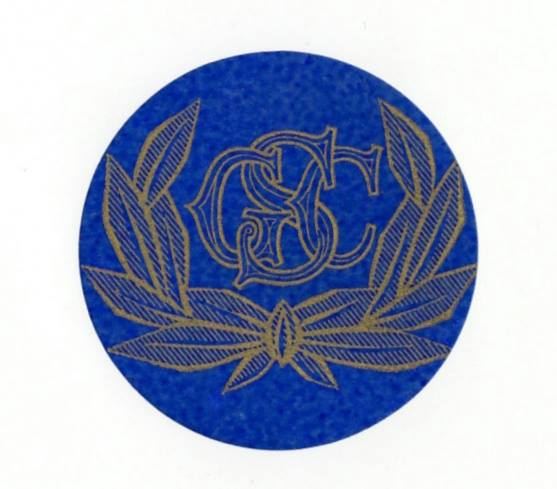
- Transfer for the helmet used by GSC presumably before dissolving.
- Formation: November 1873
- Dissolved: April 1984
- Type: Fire salvage and protection
- Legal status: Obsolete
- Purpose: Fire salvage and insurance protection
- Headquarters: North Albion Street
- Location: Glasgow
- Services: Salvage goods and prevent insurance loss due to water from fire fighting

Glasgow Salvage Corps was a service in Glasgow, Scotland. It was founded after local fire insurance companies were concerned over losses in serious fires. They inspected buildings for fire safety, increasing premiums if any of their recommendations were not met, and attended fires alongside the Fire Brigade. It was founded in November 1873 and operated until the 1st of April 1984, when its functions were transferred to the Glasgow Fire Service. Similar salvage corps also operated in London and Liverpool.

On many occasions, they would be seen salvaging any items which would be of value to the company.

== History ==
=== Incidents ===
==== McDougall & Son wholesale Glass & China Merchants fire ====
The Glass & China Merchants of 77-79 Buchanan Street suffered great damage from a fire that had begun around 9 am on 16 March 1887.

The area of the Merchants had a reputation for fires. Although McDougall's building was not even ten years old, its interior was clad in highly combustible wooden panelling. The damage had amounted to around £40,000.

Members of the Glasgow Salvage Corps were likely involved in the aftermath of salvaging valuables.

==== Cheapside Street whisky bond fire ====
On 28 March 1960, a fire broke out on Cheapside Street. A million gallons of whisky in 21,000 wooden casks and 30,000 gallons of rum were housed in the building. Some of the wooden casks, under the heat of the fire, had ruptured which caused a massive liquid vapour explosion.

An AEC Mercury TL, which suffered immense damage when the building exploded. It is presumed that it had caught fire right after the explosion.

The explosion ripped apart the front and rear walls of the building, causing massive amounts of brickwork to collapse into Cheapside Street and Warrock Street. The impact instantly killed three firemen in the explosion because of the flying bricks and a further eleven at the rear of the building who were buried in the rubble. In the end, the devastating building fire claimed 14 men from Glasgow Fire Service and five men from Glasgow Salvage Corps:

- Salvageman Gordon McMillan
- Salvageman William Oliver
- Salvageman James Mungall
- Leading Salvageman James McLellan
- Superintendent Edward Murray

==== St Andrew's Hall fire ====
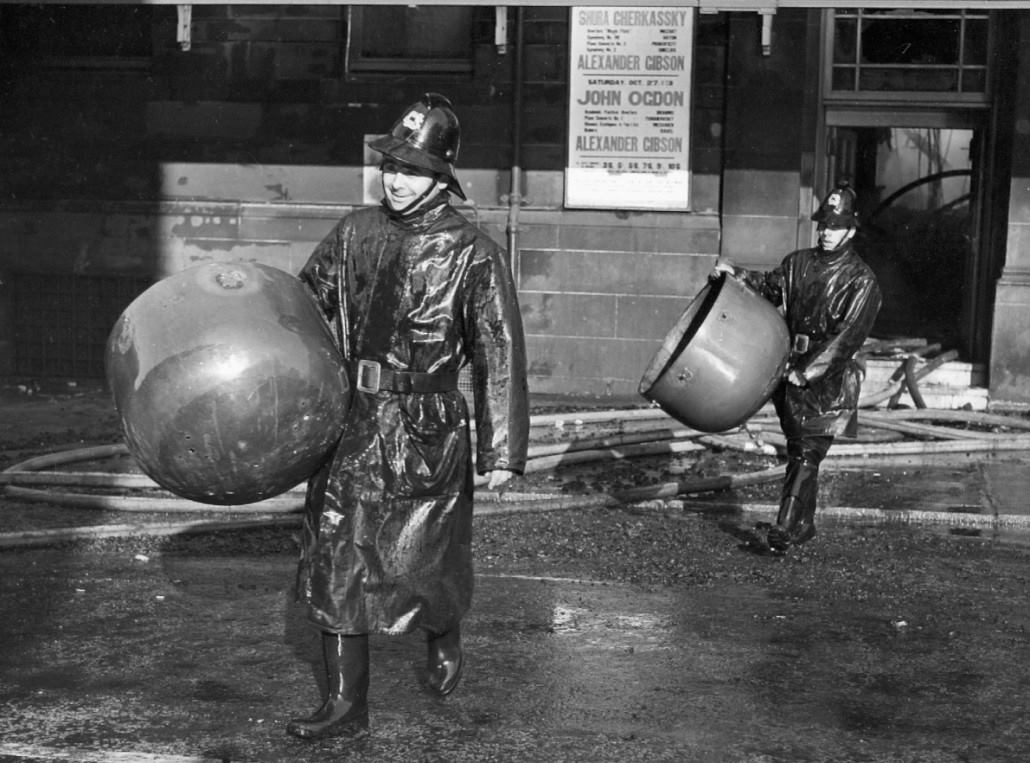
Here, Salvage Men of Glasgow Salvage Corps, are seen rescuing the remains of the Orchestra's instruments.

In October 1962, The halls of St Andrew's were nearly fully destroyed by fire. The venue had been hosting a Scotland vs. Romania boxing match that night and was believed that a careless gambler had discorded a still-lit cigarette. Smoke from the blaze was able to be seen from 20 miles away. The fire was so intense that paint on vehicles started to bubble and a motorbike caught fire.

The only part of the building that survived was the Granville Street façade at the eastern part of the site. It was incorporated into an extension of the Mitchell Library.

Some of the Salvage Men were seen rescuing the remains of the SNO's Kettle Drums. Most of the orchestra's instruments were lost in the fire.

=== Vehicles of GSC ===
==== Mercedes-Benz long-wheelbase van ====
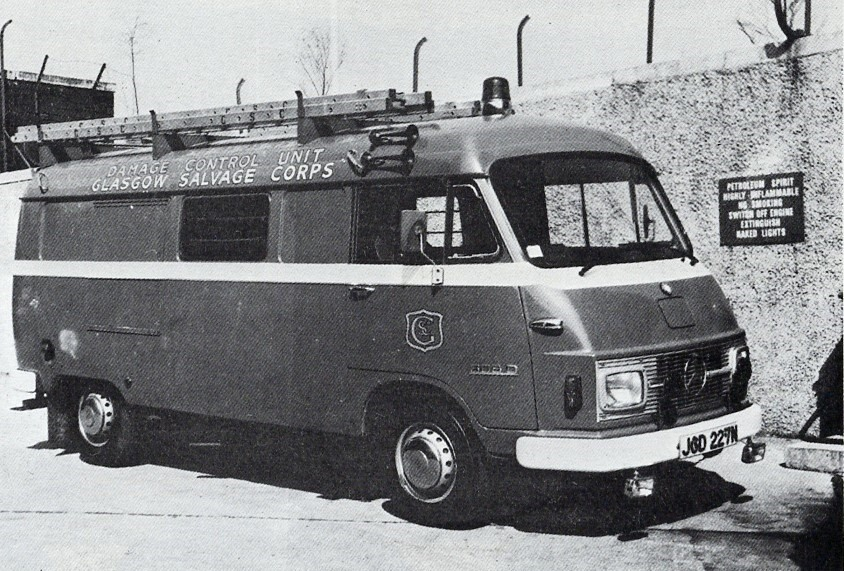
The Mercedes-Benz van delivered to Glasgow Salvage Corps in 1974 by Aiken of Linlithgow Ltd

In 1974, Glasgow Salvage Corps received a custom long-wheelbase van from Mercedes-Benz. This was a 'First Aid/Strike DCU' with the registration number JGD 277N. The bodywork of the van was produced by Aiken of Linlithgow Ltd and had a large water tank underneath the false floor inside.

An article read:

"The Special Damage Control Unit recently put on the run by Glasgow Salvage Corps is a Mercedes-Benz Long Wheelbase L306 Van and has been modified and fitted out by the specialist bodybuilders Aiken of Linlithgow Ltd. Fundamental alterations included the provision of lockers on both sides of the vehicle, accessible via hatchways cut into the vehicle above the rear wheel arches. The vehicle's tubular chassis frame made it possible for these apertures to be cut in the body shell without impairing its strength or rigidity. A large water tank is built in below in what amounts to be a false floor in the rear compartment and three or four additional crew can be carried in the central compartment behind the cab proper."

== Ranks ==
The ranks of Glasgow Salvage Corps were an altered version of regular Fire Brigade/Fire Service Ranks.

Title	Chief Officer	Deputy Chief Officer	Superintendent	Deputy Superintendent	Station Officer	Sub-Officer	Leading Salvage Man	Salvage Man
Ranks								

== End ==
The Glasgow Salvage Corps ceased to exist on 1 April 1984, after 111 years.

== See also ==
- New York Fire Patrol
- Salvage Corps
