= Liverpool Salvage Corps =

British fire salvage organisation

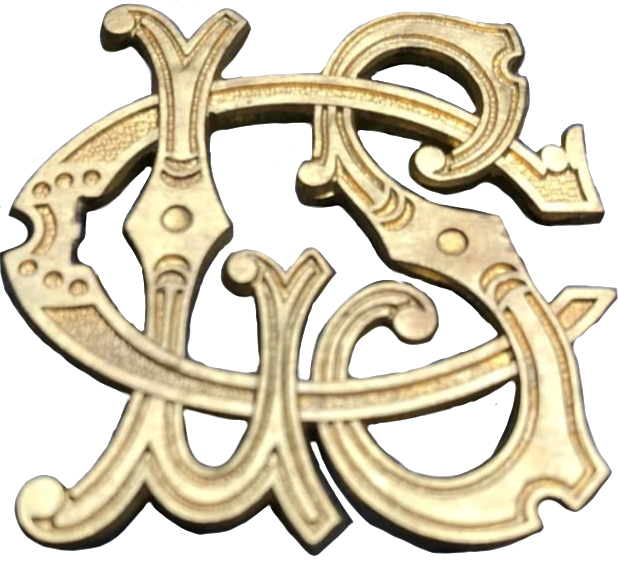
- An old helmet badge from LSC. Not to be mistaken for London Salvage Corps.
- Formation: 1842
- Dissolved: 1984
- Type: Fire salvage and protection
- Legal status: Obsolete
- Purpose: Fire salvage and insurance protection
- Headquarters: Unknown
- Location: Liverpool
- Services: Salvage goods and prevent insurance loss due to water from fire fighting

Liverpool Salvage Corps was a service in Liverpool, England, founded and maintained by fire insurers, whose aim was to reduce the loss and damage caused by fires, to help mitigate the effects of fire and of fire-fighting and to salvage both premises and goods affected by fire. It was founded in 1842 and operated until April 1984, when its functions were transferred to the Merseyside Fire Brigade. Similar salvage corps also operated in London and Glasgow.

== Origin ==
The industrial and commercial revolution of the late eighteenth and early nineteenth centuries saw a considerable rise in the prosperity of the port of Liverpool. Warehouses, sheds and storage yards were being hurriedly built and filled with goods that came into the port from all over the world. Tobacco, sugar and cotton were arriving daily and with no regulation and poor warehousing practices fire began to become an ever-increasing problem.

Liverpool had already lost its town hall in 1795 to a serious fire and following an exceptionally large blaze at Lancelot Hey in 1833, in which numerous warehouses and homes were destroyed, a private parliamentary bill was successfully enacted to establish a Fire Brigade in Liverpool. This brigade was to be part of the Liverpool City Police Force and became operational in 1836 (London took another 24 years before it had the "London Fire Engine Establishment" - an insurance organisation). Even though the City now had an efficient Fire Brigade fire losses continued at a high level.

In the early hours of Friday 23 September 1842 a fire started in a "dry salters yard" in Crompton Street in the heart of Liverpool's Dockland. A strong wind blowing from the sea fanned the flames towards the next property - an oil and varnish mill. The newly formed fire brigade stood no chance of halting the fire once it reached the 1,000 barrels of turpentine, and by dawn nine bonded warehouses, five free warehouses, seven large storage sheds, a cooperage, several timber yards, and numerous stables and 16 cottages were completely destroyed. One fireman and three labourers lost their lives.

The bulk of the financial loss had to be born by the fire insurance companies and at today’s prices ran into many millions of pounds. Within days of the fire a Committee, comprising the Secretary of the Liverpool Fire Office and the agents of the Royal, Phoenix, Sun and North British insurance companies met and resolved that a salvage brigade be established. Similar corps were established in London in 1865 and Glasgow in 1873.

== Operation of the Salvage Corps ==
The Liverpool Salvage Corps had three distinct areas of operational service.

=== Before a fire ===
The original Salvage Committee established a set of rules and regulations for all warehouses and sheds seeking to do business in the Liverpool area and who wanted to buy insurance cover. These rules set out in minute detail how premises were to be constructed, maintained and managed. Each building was given a classification which dictated what goods were allowed to be stored therein. Fire prevention and minimising the spread of fire were of paramount importance. Each registered premises was inspected in detail every year against the original classification and was randomly visited 2 or 3 times a week to make sure storage and housekeeping was of a high standard. All warehouse keepers had to be registered with the Liverpool Salvage Corps and licensed by the City Council. By these rules and regulations a great deal of order and organisation was brought to Liverpool's warehousing industry and in return for cooperating the warehouse owners enjoyed a preferential rate of insurance.

=== After the fire ===
Cotton was the largest and most important trade in Liverpool Docks which handled half of Britain's cotton imports by 1800, and 90 percent by 1830. The Liverpool Salvage Corps operated the largest cotton recovery plant in the United Kingdom. Cotton has a very high salvage potential. In the hands of experts as much as 80% of even a badly burned bale of cotton can be recovered and sold for a similar value to that of the original cotton. Liverpool Salvage Corps returned many millions of pounds to the insurance companies from its work as salvors.

=== During the fire ===
Safety considerations dictated that Liverpool Salvage Corps personnel wore uniforms and helmets similar to those of Local Authority Fire-fighters, although it was sufficiently different to make the Corps crews easily identifiable on the fire ground.

Salvage tenders were not front-line fire fighting and rescue vehicles. Their function and equipment was to prevent avoidable damage from fire fighting operations. Most major fires are extinguished using water and it is this that can result in extensive damage. A modern fire appliance can deliver many tons of water onto a fire in a very short period of time. Huge savings can be made by expert crews who have been trained in loss prevention measures and can prioritise their actions based on commercial knowledge. Speed is of the essence if unnecessary damage is to be avoided, which was why Salvage Tenders were painted red and used claxons - it is pointless turning up to a fire when all the damage has already occurred.

== Ranks ==
The ranks of Liverpool Salvage Corps were an altered version of regular Fire Brigade/Fire Service Ranks.

Title	Chief Officer	Deputy Chief Officer	Superintendent	Deputy Superintendent	Station Officer	Sub-Officer	Leading Salvage Man	Salvage Man
Ranks							N/A	

== End ==
The Liverpool Salvage Corps ceased to exist in May 1984 after 142 years.

== See also ==
- New York Fire Patrol
- Salvage Corps
