= Laguna Azul =

Laguna Azul (Spanish for "blue lake" or blue lagoon") may refer to:

- Laguna Azul (Bolivia), a lake in Bolivia
- Laguna Azul, the local name for Lake Sauce in Peru

== See also ==
- Blue Lagoon (disambiguation)
