= Kilbirnie Street fire =

1972 warehouse fire in Glasgow, Scotland

Coordinates: 55.8468°N 4.2652°W

The Kilbirnie Street fire, on Friday 25 August 1972, was a warehouse fire in the Port Eglinton area, on the south side of Glasgow, Scotland, which killed seven Glasgow Fire Service firemen in a flashover while they were trying to rescue a trapped colleague. What started as a routine industrial premises fire resulted in one of the highest losses of life for the UK Fire Service at a single incident in peacetime.

== The Sher Brothers warehouse ==
The warehouse premises at 70–72 Kilbirnie Street was used as a cash and carry warehouse by the Sher Brothers company, selling textiles, clothing and household goods. It was built as a stables in 1899, but in common with much of Glasgow's industrial premises at that time, had seen numerous uses over the years. It was a brick built construction of ground, first and attic floors, connected by internal stairs and a goods lift. The first floor was of concrete construction, and the attic floor of composite steel and timber, supported on cast iron columns. Internal partitioning consisted of timber frames with hardboard lining. An external steel stair opening off the attic and first floors acted as the fire escape route. Stock was arranged on steel frame shelving and stacked on the floor. The potential fire load was considered high following a fire prevention visit in December 1971 and again in March 1972. It had been occupied by the owners since 1970.

== The fire ==
The fire was discovered by an employee while searching for stock and appeared to have started on the attic floor. Three 999 calls were received by Glasgow Fire Service control by 11:21 am and two water tenders and a turntable ladder were dispatched from South station, with Station Officer Carroll in charge, arriving at around 11:24. A serious fire was seen to be in progress, with smoke emitting from the building and from the roof. All staff had evacuated, and the fire brigade were faced with a serious but largely routine fire. Divisional Officer Quinn arrived soon after, and after early investigations with Carroll, called for reinforcements by "Making Pumps 4". Queens Park and West Marine Fire Stations despatched two further water tenders, arriving around 11.30.

Glasgow Salvage Corps despatched a vehicle to the scene as part of the initial attendance, and their men began their normal fireground task of attempting to protect stock from fire and smoke damage by covering with plastic sheeting. On the "Make Pumps 4" message, a second salvage tender was despatched. Crews using breathing apparatus ("BA"), searching the building for the seat of the fire, found conditions very difficult with thick smoke and the crowded layout of the premises hampering progress.

With the arrival of the additional pump from West Marine Fire Station at 11:33, Station Officer Carroll ordered the roof be opened to assist in ventilating the building. This was effected under difficult circumstances, from ladders pitched against the building, and thick smoke began emitting through the hole created.

The complex layout of the stock and partitioning of the building created difficulty finding the fire. With the intense heat and thick smoke, internal fire fighting was effected on the first and second floors. Around this time, a small amount of fire was noted breaking through the first floor ceiling, which was addressed. This indicated serious fire in the attic floor above. At around 12:00 with the initial crews becoming exhausted, Divisional Officer Quinn requested the attendance of an emergency tender, for the additional breathing apparatus and fresh men. This was dispatched from South Fire Station.

== The attempted rescue of Fireman Rook ==
Around 11:55, with conditions deteriorating, Divisional Officer Quinn ordered all men from the building. As he was leaving, Fireman Rook was asked by an officer (who possibly had not heard the order to evacuate) to assist in a flare up of fire in the attic. They attempted to turn a hose on the fire, but were engulfed by a stock collapse that stunned both men. The Officer came to and managed to stumble out and raise the alarm. Soon after the "Man trapped" message was sent, Deputy Firemaster McGill turned out to Kilbirnie Street, hearing a "Make Pumps 8" message whilst en route, arriving around 12:18 to take command.

With the discovery that Fireman Rook was missing, a rescue party was sent in to get him, but had to be pulled out due to exhaustion. Divisional Officer Quinn was not prepared to leave Rook to his fate, and a second rescue attempt was mounted. Between around 12:05 and 12:20, Leading Fireman Crofts, Firemen Bermingham, Finlay, Hooper and McMillan donned breathing apparatus and, with Quinn, returned to the attic floor. Inside they found Rook. Fireman Murray dug him out of the collapsed stock. Fireman Murray, not in BA and suffering burns, had to leave the scene, and was assisted from the building by Firemen Welsh and Smith who managed to drag him clear. Fireman Hugh Welsh was to receive a bravery award for his actions. Rook was being dragged out of the collapsed stock when a rapid and fierce eruption of heat and flame across the first floor ceiling engulfed the rescuers, leading to a structural collapse. It gradually became apparent to those outside that a serious situation had occurred.

A roll call in the street showed who was missing, and further rescue attempts were made from ladders through the first floor windows. The first body was found at 1:48 pm, and when it was clear that no survivors were to be found, rescuers were ordered to withdraw from the building until the fire was under control. It was no longer justifiable to risk further men, as the building was in a hazardous condition. The fire was attacked externally from turntable ladders, hydraulic platform, and a "Scoosher" aerial monitor. By mid afternoon, with the fire under control, the bodies could be retrieved, with the last body, that of Fireman Rook, found at around 6:11 pm.

== Firefighters killed ==
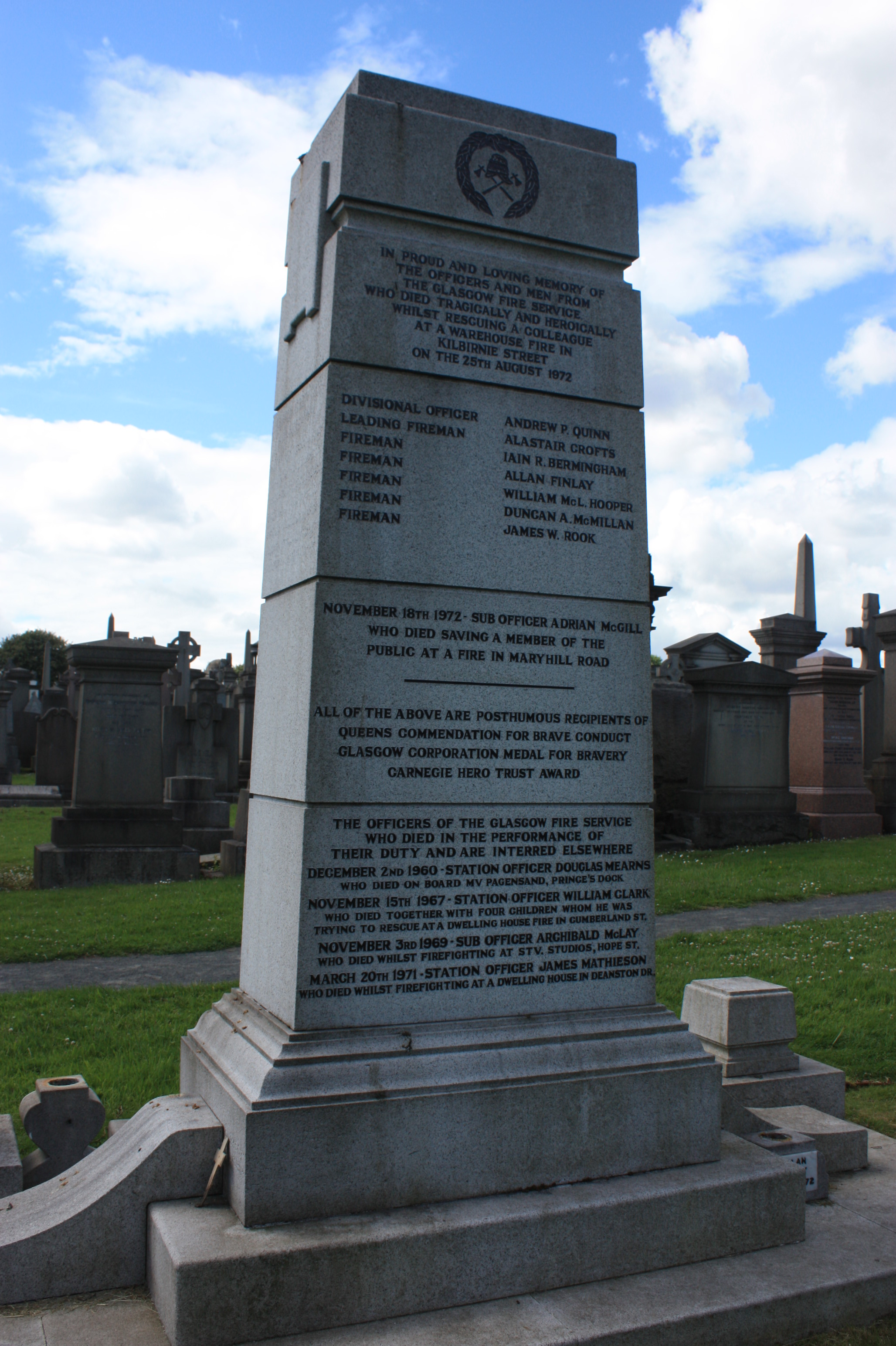
The memorial to those lost in the Kilbirnie Street Fire, Glasgow Necropolis

These firemen were killed on 25 August 1972 during this event

- Divisional Officer Andrew Quinn, 47, South Division, Glasgow Fire Service
- Leading Fireman Alistair Crofts, 31, Pollok Fire Station, Glasgow Fire Service
- Fireman Iain Bermingham, 29, South Fire Station, Glasgow Fire Service
- Fireman Allan Finlay, 20, South Fire Station, Glasgow Fire Service
- Fireman William Hooper, 44, North West Fire Station, Glasgow Fire Service
- Fireman Duncan McMillan, 25, South Fire Station, Glasgow Fire Service
- Fireman James Rook, 29, South Fire Station, Glasgow Fire Service

The names of those lost were added to the eastern side of the memorial to the firefighters lost in the Cheapside Street whisky bond fire, standing on the eastern side of the upper section of the Glasgow Necropolis.

== The aftermath ==
Glasgow Fire Service went into a state of mourning for its largest loss of men since the 1960 Cheapside Street whisky bond fire, and public funerals were held before the men were laid to rest in the Glasgow Necropolis. The building was deemed unsafe following an inspection by a Glasgow Corporation building inspector, and demolition commenced almost immediately. Subsequently the premises were rebuilt on the same site. They are still occupied today.

A fatal accident inquiry under Sheriff Bryden was held at Glasgow Sheriff Court. At this inquiry, it became apparent that the fire spread across the hardboard clad first floor ceiling led to the flashover that ended up engulfing the men who died. The behaviour and bravery of the men involved were stated to be of the highest order, and in the best traditions of the Glasgow Fire Service.

== See also ==
- Fire services in Scotland
- Cheapside Street whisky bond fire, 1960
- James Watt Street fire, 1968
