= James Watt Street fire =

Factory fire in Scotland

Coordinates: 55.8575°N 4.2641°W

James Watt Street Fire
- Date: 18 November 1968
- Time: 10:30
- Duration: 10:30 AM -3 PM
- Location: Glasgow, Scotland
- Deaths: 22
- Property damage: Destruction of factory due to fire

The James Watt Street fire on Monday, 18 November 1968, was a fatal factory fire in Glasgow, Scotland, with 22 employees killed. The number of fatalities was a consequence of the building retaining barred windows, a feature remaining from its previous use as a whisky bond. Around 100 firemen from Glasgow Fire Service attended this incident, which reinforced Glasgow's reputation for tragic fires in the 30 years after the Second World War.

Many of these fires resulted from poor building standards, with many premises being modified from their original purpose. Glasgow city centre did not suffer from wartime bombing to the extent of other British cities, and consequently, many industrial premises were still of nineteenth-century origin, and were located in cramped and narrow streets.

== Stern furniture upholstery factory ==
The factory premises was located in James Watt Street, a street between Argyle Street and the Broomielaw on the north side of the River Clyde. The building consisted of a ground, first, and second floors, with basement. Julius and Samuel Stern ran the upholstery business, B Stern Ltd., on the upper floors. A glass company, G. Bryce, occupied the basement and part of the ground floor. The building had previously been used as a whisky bond (a warehouse used for storage before excise duty has been paid) and, in common with many of Glasgow's industrial premises, had seen numerous changes of use. The previous use of the building involved high security measures including barred windows, meaning that, in the event of a fire, escape could be compromised. In the following enquiry, it was discovered that the doors to the fire escape were locked from the inside.

== The fire ==
The alarm was raised at around 10:30, with the first crews arriving within five minutes. A serious fire was seen to be in progress and a "Make Pumps 10" message was sent to control almost immediately (additional appliances required, which in addition to those already there would total 10). As part of this request for reinforcements, a "Persons Reported" message was sent, indicating persons were requiring urgent assistance and rescue. 70 firemen attended to fight the fire, with water poured onto the building from turntable ladders. It was found that efforts at rescue were futile due to the intense heat and the difficulties in entering the building.

Escape from the building had been prevented due to fire on the stairs, caused by polyurethane foam, and the escape doors from the first and second floors to the fire escape were found to have been locked from the inside. Eventually, no persons were seen at the windows, and any hopes of rescue for those inside ended when the roof of the building collapsed. Many attempts were made to enter the building where the employees were believed to be but intense heat drove back the firemen. The Glasgow Fire Service personnel eventually gained access to the building, by cutting through the steel doors using oxy-propane cutting gear.

The fire was brought under control around 3 pm by which time 20 bodies had been found. A further two were found later, totalling 22 (five women, and 17 men). Only four people of those known to be in the building escaped. The dead found inside the factory were judged to have died due to the inhalation of smoke, the burning of polyurethane foam resulting in poisonous fumes.

== See also ==
- Fire services in Scotland
- Cheapside Street whisky bond fire, 1960
- Kilbirnie Street fire, 1972
