= Underwriters Salvage Corps (St. Louis) =

Salvage corps, 1874–1955

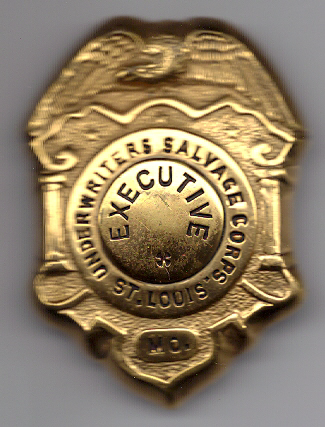
Badge worn by Leslie Bright

The Underwriters Salvation Corps of St Louis was created in May 1874 to reduce the loss of property in fires. It was one of several Salvage Corps that formed in the 19th century to deal with fire in growing cities. Members would be part of Fire Patrols that, in the event of a fire, would enter burning structures and remove valuables before the fire could destroy them. This organization helped innovate early fire equipment. The organization "came to a close at the stroke of midnight on December 31, 1955"

== Members ==
- Leslie Bright
- Charles Henry Campfield
- Thomas R. Collins
- William Bellrose
- Charles Meyers
- George T Cram — First President
- Charles Evens — First Chief
- Frank O Gailey — Deputy Chief
- Ernest Hyacinthe Peugnet — President
- John Glanville — Chief and Designer of Special Motor Wagon, and a custom Locomobile
- Thomas M. Gorman — Captain
- Joseph Franklin Hickey — Treasurer
- James T O'Donnell — Chief
- John J. O'Toole
- Frank Roeder — Treasurer
- A. H. Schwarz
- Raymond W. Smith
- Roy W. Smith
- Lewis E Snow — First Secretary
