= Boston Protective Department =

Salvage corps created by insurance companies in Boston, MA

Agency overview
- Established: 1859
- Dissolved: 1959
- Employees: 61 (circa 1911)

Facilities and equipment
- Stations: 3
- Trucks: 3

The Boston Protective Department was a salvage corps created by insurance companies in Boston, Massachusetts. The department was first organized in 1859 and granted a charter by the Massachusetts legislature in 1874. The department disbanded in 1959. Like many salvage corps, the employees were not employed by the city.

During the department's heyday, it had 3 stations, usually old firehouses. In 1911, the department had 61 employees, which consisted of a superintendent, three captains, six lieutenants, 33 permanent men and 18 auxiliaries.

== Stations ==
- Protective #1 - 124-126 Broad Street - Downtown
- Protective #2 - 4 Appleton Street - South End
- Protective #3 - 161 Roxbury Street - Roxbury
