= Underwriters Salvage Corps (Cincinnati, Ohio) =

- U.S. National Register of Historic Places
- Cincinnati Local Historic Landmark
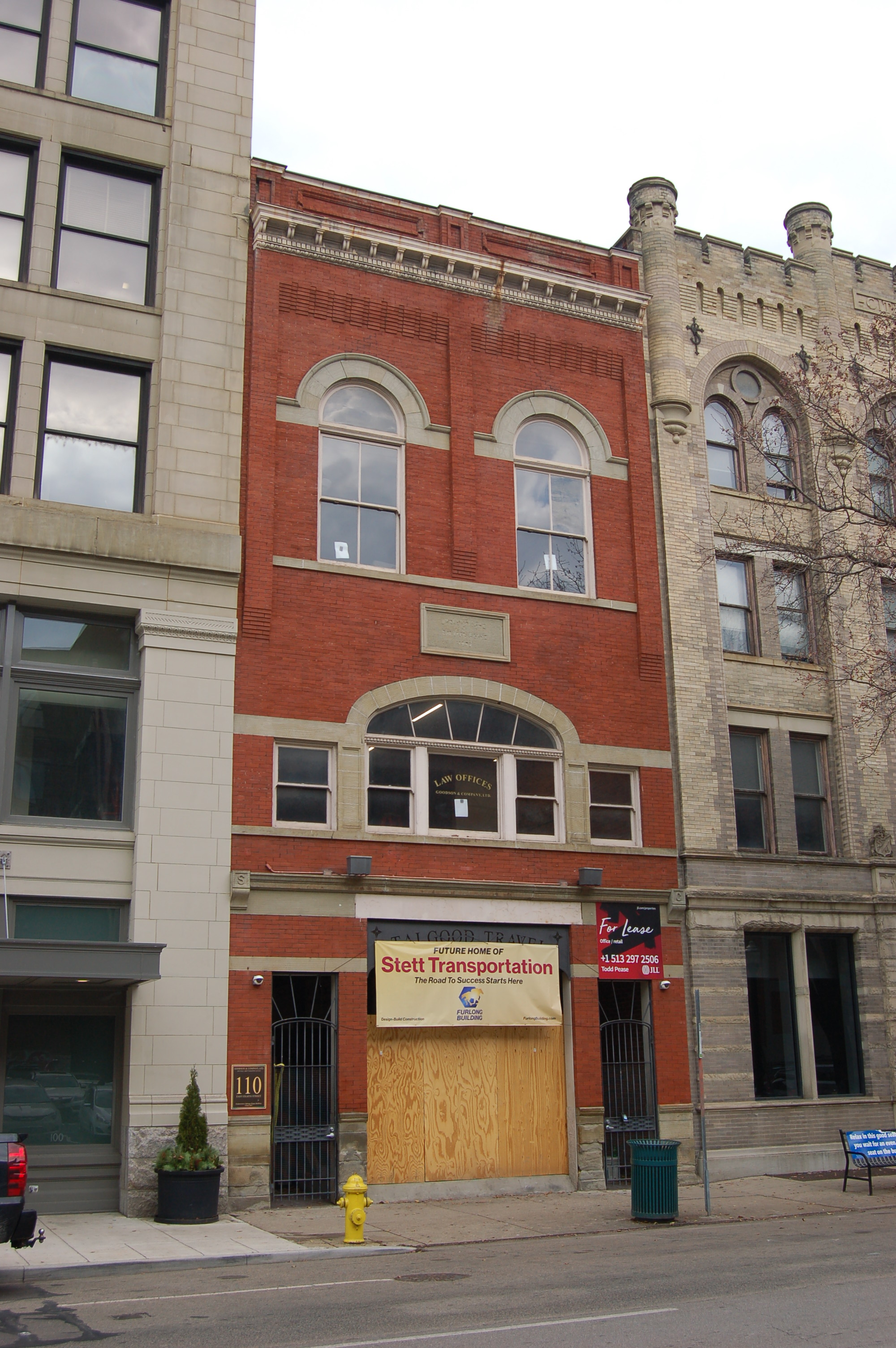

- Location within Ohio Location within the United States
- Location: 110-112 E. 8th St., Cincinnati, Ohio
- Coordinates: 39°6′18″N 84°30′42″W
- Area: less than one acre
- Built: 1897
- Architect: William Schuberth
- Architectural style: Queen Anne
- NRHP reference No.: 82003589
- Added to NRHP: July 15, 1982

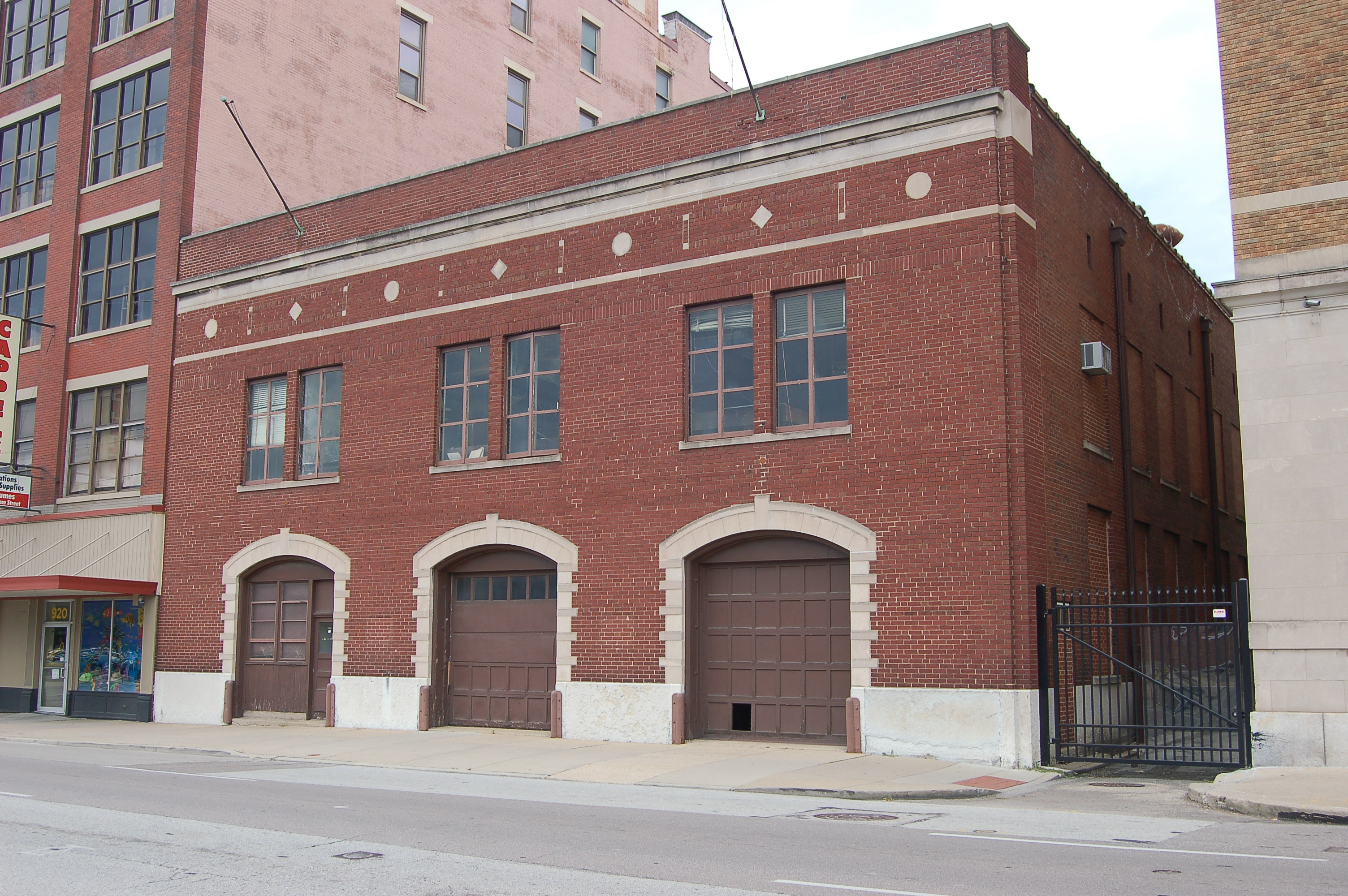
Elm St. Salvage Corps HQ opened in 1924

The Underwriter's Salvage Corps in Cincinnati, Ohio was created and operated by the Underwriters Association, a syndicate of Cincinnati-based fire insurance companies, for the purpose of reducing financial losses to their companies from claims due to building fires by providing a company of trained men with proper equipment to work in conjunction with the city fire department to protect life, structures and their contents from fire, smoke damage, and damage from the water that was used to fight the fire. The Salvage Corps worked to save and protect the structure and its contents while the city fire department concentrated on rescuing persons from the burning structure and extinguishing the flames. The Salvage Corps provided this service to all property owners without charge, whether they were insured or not.

Modelled after Bill Bullwinkle's Fire Insurance Patrol (1871-1959) in Chicago, the Underwriter's Salvage Corps in Cincinnati began operation November 24, 1886 and ceased operations on June 30, 1959 when the Cincinnati Fire Department Squad 1 assumed its role.

The Salvage Corps was organized in 1886 by William Calvert, Frederick Rauh, and John A. Townsley and operated under a board of trustees as a private company. Authorization to operate in conjunction with the city fire department was granted through the authority of the city Board of Fire Commissioners, who granted the company superintendent Herman F. Newman, and later the members of the Corps, equal status and authority as any city fireman. This legal structure would continue for the next 16 years.

Under an act of the Ohio Legislature passed April 29, 1902, William H. Calvert, Karl A. Benndorf, J. W. Montgomery, William Stredelman, and Edward E. Shipley reorganized the Salvage Corps into a non-profit corporation, a structure it would retain until it dissolved in 1959. Entitled H.B. 636, the purpose of the act was to allow formation of corporations for "...discovering and preventing fires and of saving property and life..." by providing for the establishment of companies of men with proper equipment to accomplish the tasks mentioned. These companies were also authorized "...to enter any building at any time for the purpose of inspection and any building on fire or which may be exposed to or in danger of taking fire..." in order to protect the structure, property, or life therein during or after the fire has been extinguished. The statute concluded by restating the line of authority at a fire scene as previously established under Ohio law and under which these organizations would function, "...said superintendent and the members of said patrol, while on duty at a fire, shall in all respects be subordinate to and under the control of the public authority...", specifically the senior fire officer on the scene being in overall command.

Over time, the Salvage Corps became so integral to fighting fire in the City of Cincinnati that they were nearly indistinguishable from the Cincinnati Fire Department and CFD personnel. Even though they were a privately held, funded, and operated company, their apparatus, uniforms, and equipment were identical to that of the city fire department. They used the same communication and radio frequencies as the city department to facilitate contact at fire scenes, and training was integrated between the two organizations to better foster understanding of procedures, cooperation, and efficiency of effort.

== Background ==
In Cincinnati, firefighting and saving property from fire began with the beginning of the village creating a long established tradition. Founded in 1788, the village appointed a "night watch" in 1789, who like the Vigiles Urbani of Rome, patrolled the streets looking for structure fires so that people could sleep soundly and at peace in their beds. In the Cincinnati Division of Fire, the term "night watch" continues to this day designating the over night period and the term is also used by fire personnel to designate assignment to the station's communications room during the overnight period, an assignment based upon a rotating schedule of personnel from all companies in the house. In 1802, the village passed an ordinance requiring every household to possess a leather bucket of specific dimensions to be used for fire fighting. In 1808, the Fire Bucket Company was organized by the village to formalize firefighting operations.

Salvage companies were formed later as an adjunct of fire fighting in the city. On December 21, 1820, The Protection Society Company No. 1 was formed with an authorized membership of 100, its purpose was the saving of lives, protecting property and preventing theft at fire scenes. By 1830, it had but 50 enrolled members. A second company, The Company of Cincinnati Fire Guards, began operation in August, 1832. Authorized for a membership of 250, their role was not only salvage and protection but use of police powers to cordon off fire scenes and control access, remove intruders, and compel bystanders to assist with salvage operations or firefighting. The company disbanded in 1854, the year after the city established the first full-time municipally operated fire department.

=== Stations ===
The Salvage Corps operated from four stations over its 74 years of operation. When the Corps began operation in November, 1886, "...the first location was in a stable on the east side of Bowen Alley (now Bowen Street in Downtown Cincinnati), north of 8th Street, between Walnut and Main Streets." This installation contained a horse, a wagon and its salvage equipment plus the few men employed by the Corps at the time. This location operated until a new headquarters was occupied in 1897.

The minutes of a Special Meeting of the Board of Trustees on July 23, 1897 show authorization for a 12 year lease/option to buy for a property at 114 East 8th Street, just around the corner from the Bowen Alley location, to be used for the construction of a new Salvage House. The minutes of that meeting also show acceptance of a bid from William Schuberth in the amount of $6220.00 to construct the building on that site using the Salvage Corps plans and specifications. This would be the Salvage Corps headquarters until 1924.

On July 15, 1982, this building, now numbered 112 East 8th Street was added to the National Register of Historic Places, with the reference number 82003589. The building is listed as three and a half stories of brick construction on a stone foundation in the Queen Anne style. In 2019, a Northern Kentucky trucking company acquired the building for its corporate headquarters and offices.

In 1908, a second station was put into service on the corner of Barnard and Lowry Streets, near Spring Grove Avenues and a block south of the east end of the then new Western Hills Viaduct. This station would continue in operation until 1924. The building was subsequently razed during the 1980's.

During this period of two station operation, for purposes of response, the city was divided at Vine Street, the city's main North-South corridor - the 8th Street station handled all calls east of Vine St., while the Barnard Street station responded to all calls west of Vine Street.

In 1924, a new Headquarters building to house the Corps operations was built and opened at 912-918 Elm Street, behind Crosley Square, the offices and studios of WLW radio. On the first floor, the building had three bays to house the custom-built GMC/Kinnaird Body Works apparatus used by the Corpsmen. It also included a work area for maintenance and cleaning, plus the "Joker Room", the term for the communications center of the station. On the second floor were the Administrative Offices and for the on-duty personnel the living quarters with a kitchen and lounge. Sliding poles for quick access to the apparatus floor were included.

When the Salvage Corps ceased operation in 1959, building ownership devolved to the City of Cincinnati. It would be used by various city departments for storage and other purposes until 2019 when it was transferred to private ownership.

=== Marguerite ===
The Underwriter's Salvage Corps in Cincinnati employed "...the first successful motor-propelled fire vehicle to be put in operation anywhere in the United States." Around 1900, the Salvage Corps administration realized that Cincinnati's "...hilly, horse-killing terrain..." might be better served by a new invention, the automobile, and went into planning a motorized replacement for the older horse-drawn salvage wagons.

After several years of research and planning, the Salvage Corps purchased a Winton motor car chassis with a two-cylinder, 50 horsepower motor capable of climbing the hills of Cincinnati. Known as a "sidewinder", the engine starting crank was inserted into the motor from the side of the vehicle instead of the more common front entry. The tires of the vehicle were made of laminated leather either nailed or riveted to the wood spoke wheels.

From the many carriage and wagon manufacturers in the city, the Corps selected the Hanauer Bicycle Company on East 7th Street near Corps headquarters to make the custom designed body. The body had an open bed with a bench seat for the Corpsmen on each side and a wire basket behind the cab for tools and equipment, the configuration being nearly identical to that of the horse-drawn wagons that had been in service since the beginning of the organization. Various equipment was mounted on the running boards along each side of the vehicle with hand-held fire extinguishers being added later.

Although sources differ on the date that the "Marguerite" was put into service, 1905 is most quoted. This unit was overhauled in 1907 to enlarge the body and make improvements to the motor.

The truck was christened with a bottle of champagne by Marguerite Conway, eldest daughter of Superintendent Jack Conway when put into service. As a result, the Corpsmen began referring to the truck as the "Marguerite" to differentiate it from other equipment and the nickname stuck. The name was later painted onto the side of the unit.

=== Technology and operations ===
Techniques and tactics for extinguishing uncontrolled structure fires and protecting the contents thereof would evolve over time. In America's Colonial Period, when an uncontrolled structure fire almost guaranteed that the building would burn to the ground due to a lack of adequate firefighting capability, volunteer organizations of concerned citizens rescued victims and carried out furniture, specifically the costly bed first, and any other property that could be reached and removed as the only option open to them. By 1800, volunteer fire brigades were common in most cities, the first of which was formed in Philadelphia by Benjamin Franklin in 1736. Most of these were ineffectual bucket brigades or used hand-powered engines of little capacity although somewhat better than buckets alone.

In 1852, Alexander Bonner Latta, a railroad locomotive builder in Cincinnati, in cooperation with Abel Shawk and Miles Greenwood, a local foundry operator and future Chief of the new Cincinnati Fire Department, created the first successful steam-powered piston-pump fire engine. This advance in technology would rule firefighting until the early 20th Century when fire trucks with gasoline engines replaced pumpers powered by steam and drawn by horses. By mid-century, centrifugal pumps would replace piston pumps on all fire fighting vehicles.

Advances in salvage operations followed advances in fire fighting. In Cincinnati in 1836, Mathew Carey, known locally as "Old Mat", is credited with innovating the use of wet mats, wet carpets, and wet blankets hung on adjacent buildings as a form of protection from taking fire from the burning theater next door. Fifty years later, this innovation would become the centerpiece of Salvage Corps operations. Made of "duck", a course woven cotton clothe graded by weight from 1, the densest, to 12, the lightest, as set by the Federal Bureau of Standards, these 12 by 18 foot covers, like tarpaulins, were used in a variety of ways depending upon their Salvage Corps classification - Class A's were new, Class B's were older covers and contained tears or holes that had been patched at some prior time, Class C's were older still, had been patched many times and were only used to cover broken windows. When Class C's were no longer serviceable, they were cut up and used as patches.

The Salvage Corps used these covers for various protective schemes. The most frequent was covering merchandise to prevent water or smoke damage during firefighting operations. They could also be set up to divert water from fire hoses to outside the building or away from merchandise within the property. When fire or bad weather had unroofed a building or broken windows, covers were spread across the exposed roof openings as temporary roofing or over windows as temporary closures. They were also used as Old Mat had used his, as protection from "adjacent exposures", a fire department term for buildings or anything at risk of burning from proximity to a working fire.

Sprinkler systems were another potential source of damage with which the Salvage Corps had to deal. Patented in 1874 by Philip Pratt sprinkler systems are a series of metal pipes charged with water attached to the ceiling of a structure into which specialized "heads" are installed at specific distances along each pipe. Each valve, or "head", has a soft metal ball that holds the valve closed until the heat of the fire melts the ball allowing the valve to open and spray water to suppress the fire below. As with water from fire hoses, water from sprinkler systems could be equally damaging to contents and property so the Salvage Corps carried specialized equipment for shutting off sprinkler systems whether do to fire or burst pipes due to freezing.

The Salvage Corps also dealt with ventilating smoke, which could easily damage merchandise, as well as life-threatening poisonous fumes, an inherent danger in firefighting that could cost any personnel working the fire scene their life. In this era before self-contained breathing apparatus air masks became the standard for personnel fighting fire, "gas masks" were rudimentary, if available at all, and ventilating the "scene" was critical to fire fighter safety. The Salvage Corps carried large fans for this purpose powered by generators in their custom designed trucks.

== Superintendents ==
The Salvage Corps had four superintendents, or chiefs, during the existence of the company.

Name	start date	end date
Herman F. Newman	1886	1894
John J. Conway	November 7, 1894	February 21, 1932
Edward J. Ader	March, 1932	April 1, 1950
H. C. Williams	April, 1950	June 30, 1959

== Corpsmen Killed in the line of duty ==
In the 74 years of operation, The Salvage Corps had four members killed in the line of duty.

Name	date of the accident	description of the accident
Herman Schroeder	1913	Killed in an auto accident responding to an alarm
Harry Stuhlmeyer	September 2, 1923	Fell down a shaft in a Second Street factory
Chris Wolfer	February 14, 1931	Died from smoke inhalation during a Third Street building fire
Edward Brabender	February 14, 1931	Buried under a wall collapse while covering merchandise
