= Princess Selandia =

Danish train ferry built in 1951

Coordinates: 54.1083°N 3.2264°W

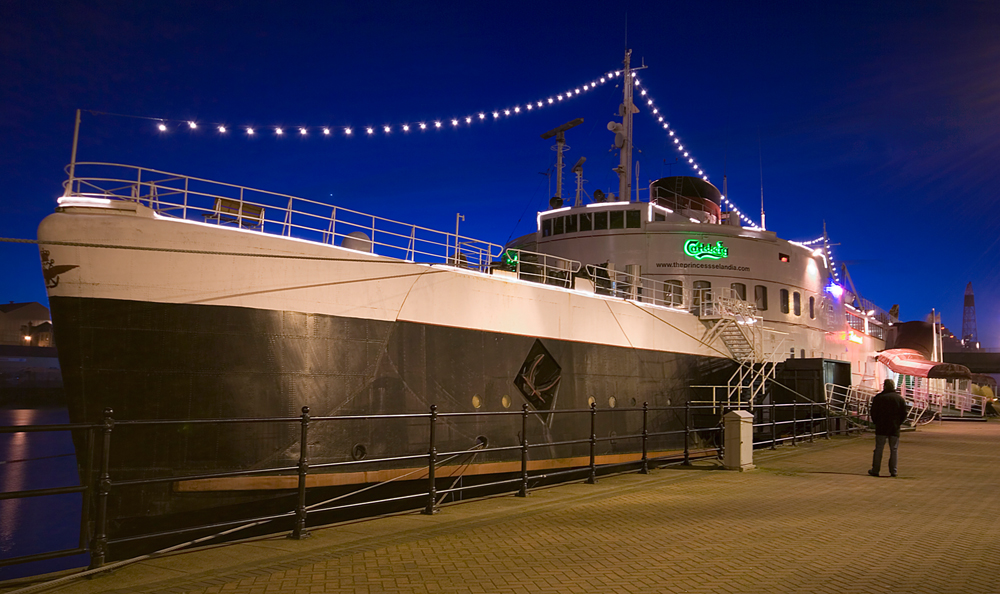
- Princess Selandia berthed in Buccleuch Dock, Barrow-in-Furness

History

Denmark
- Name: MF Dronning Ingrid
- Namesake: Queen Ingrid
- Owner: Dansk Statsbaner (DSB), the Danish State Railroad
- Route: Korsør - Nyborg
- Builder: Helsingør Skibsværft og Maskinbyggeri, Helsingør, Denmark
- Yard number: 302
- Launched: 24 November 1950
- Completed: April 1951
- In service: 17 April 1951
- Out of service: 1982
- Identification: IMO number: 5093959; Callsign OXUA
- Fate: Arrived in Frederikshavn, Denmark on 22 July 2015 for scrapping.

General characteristics
- Type: Ferry
- Tonnage: 924 DWT; 3,046 GRT
- Length: 110.40 m (362.2 ft)
- Beam: 17.70 m (58.1 ft)
- Draft: 4.00 m (13.1 ft)
- Installed power: 2 × HSM/B&W 650-VF-90 diesels, 5,450 hk (4,008kW)
- Speed: 17 knots
- Capacity: 1,500 passengers

Princess Selandia was a Danish train ferry which had a long career on the Great Belt and the Baltic Sea, after which she became a restaurant and nightclub ship, at one time moored in Barrow-in-Furness, England.

Built for DSB, the Danish State Railway, she began service as Dronning Ingrid (Queen Ingred) on the Korsør – Nyborg route in April 1951. She subsequently operated on several Danish inter-island and Denmark-Germany routes. In August 1979 she was renamed Sjælland, although portraits of the Danish royal family remained in the state cabin on board. For a time she plied between Malmö, Sweden and Copenhagen.

In 1985 she was rented out to Danish Radio and TV as a studio and used as the setting for Danish TV show "Kajplads 114" (Berth 114) in Copenhagen.

In 1988 she became a museum and restaurant ship and was sold to English interests in April 2002, being moved to Tilbury, England and renamed Selandia.

Following purchase by Rick Lucas in June 2004, she was sailed from Tilbury to Barrow-in-Furness for a £2 million, nine-month refurbishment and renamed Princess Selandia. The whole freight deck, which once carried trains, was converted to "The Blue Lagoon" - a 2,500-capacity nightclub. The night club operated from Town Quay, Buccleuch Dock, Barrow-in-Furness until 16 August 2010. She also had an a la carte restaurant, casino and beer garden. On 9 October 2010 a fire started aboard the Princess Selandia. On 14 July 2015 she left Barrow-in-Furness for Frederikshavn, Denmark, for scrapping.

== Technical external resources ==
- (in Danish) http://www.faergelejet.dk/faerge.php?id=801&n=4
- (in Danish) https://www.faergejournalen.dk/Korsoer-Nyborg/dronning_ingrid_1951.htm
