= Cheapside Street whisky bond fire =

1960 fire in Glasgow, Scotland

Coordinates: 55.8575°N 4.27136°W

Cheapside Whisky Bond Fire
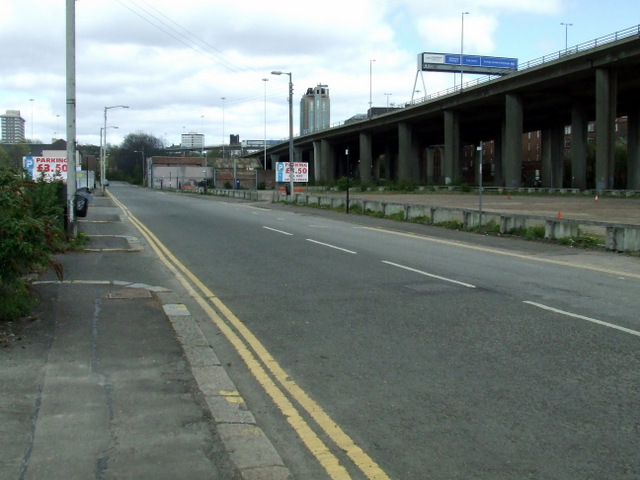
- Cheapside Street in the 2000s, none of the destroyed buildings were ever replaced.
- Date: 20 March 1960; 66 years ago
- Time: 19:15
- Location: Cheapside Street, Anderston, Glasgow, Scotland
- Type: Structure fire
- Cause: Boiling liquid expanding vapor explosion
- Deaths: 19
- Injuries: unknown

The Cheapside Street whisky bond fire in Glasgow on 28 March 1960 is Britain's worst peacetime fire services disaster. The fire at a whisky bond killed 14 fire service and 5 salvage corps personnel. This fire was overshadowed only by a similar fire in James Watt Street (also in Glasgow) on 19 November 1968, when 22 people died.

== Fire ==
On the evening of 28 March 1960, a fire started in a bonded warehouse owned by Arbuckle, Smith and Company in Cheapside Street, Anderston, Glasgow.

The Glasgow Fire Service was initially alerted by a 999 call at 7:15& pm from the foreman of the Eldorado Ice Cream Company, which was near the whisky bond. He reported smoke coming from a second floor window of the warehouse. In response, two pumps (fire engines) from West Station with Sub Officer James Calder in charge were sent, along with a turntable ladder from Central Station. Also responding initially was the fire boat St Mungo and a salvage tender and crew from the Glasgow Salvage Corps.

The first fire crews arrived at 7:21 pm and after a quick reconnaissance three more pumps were requested to attend. Crews were informed by civilians that smoke and flame had been seen on the Warroch Street side of the building and additional crews and equipment were sent to investigate. Assistant Firemaster Swanson had now arrived on the scene and having been fully apprised of the situation increased the number of pumps to eight. This message was sent at 7:49 pm.

Seconds after it was transmitted, an explosion occurred. The warehouse contained over a million gallons of whisky held in 21,000 wooden casks, and 30,000 gallons of rum. As the temperature of the fire increased, some of these casks ruptured, causing a massive boiling liquid expanding vapour explosion (BLEVE) that burst the front and rear walls of the building outwards causing large quantities of masonry to collapse into the street. This collapse instantly killed three firemen in Cheapside Street as well as 11 firemen and five salvagemen who were battling the blaze from the rear of the building in Warroch Street.

The remains of an AEC Mercury turntable ladder that was destroyed in the disaster

By 8:12 pm, Firemaster Chadwick assumed command and upgraded the incident to twenty pumps. At its peak, thirty pumps, five turntable ladders and various special vehicles attended. In all, 450 firefighters from the Greater Glasgow area were involved in fighting the fire, which took a week to extinguish. Witnesses reported seeing bright blue flames leaping 40 feet (12 metres) into the sky, with the glow visible across the entire city. Neighbouring buildings, including a tobacco warehouse, an ice cream factory and the Harland & Wolff engine works, were engulfed. The recovery of the bodies in Warroch Street was not completed until 10:20 am on 31 March.

The incident remains Britain's worst peacetime fire services disaster.

== Firefighters and salvagemen killed ==
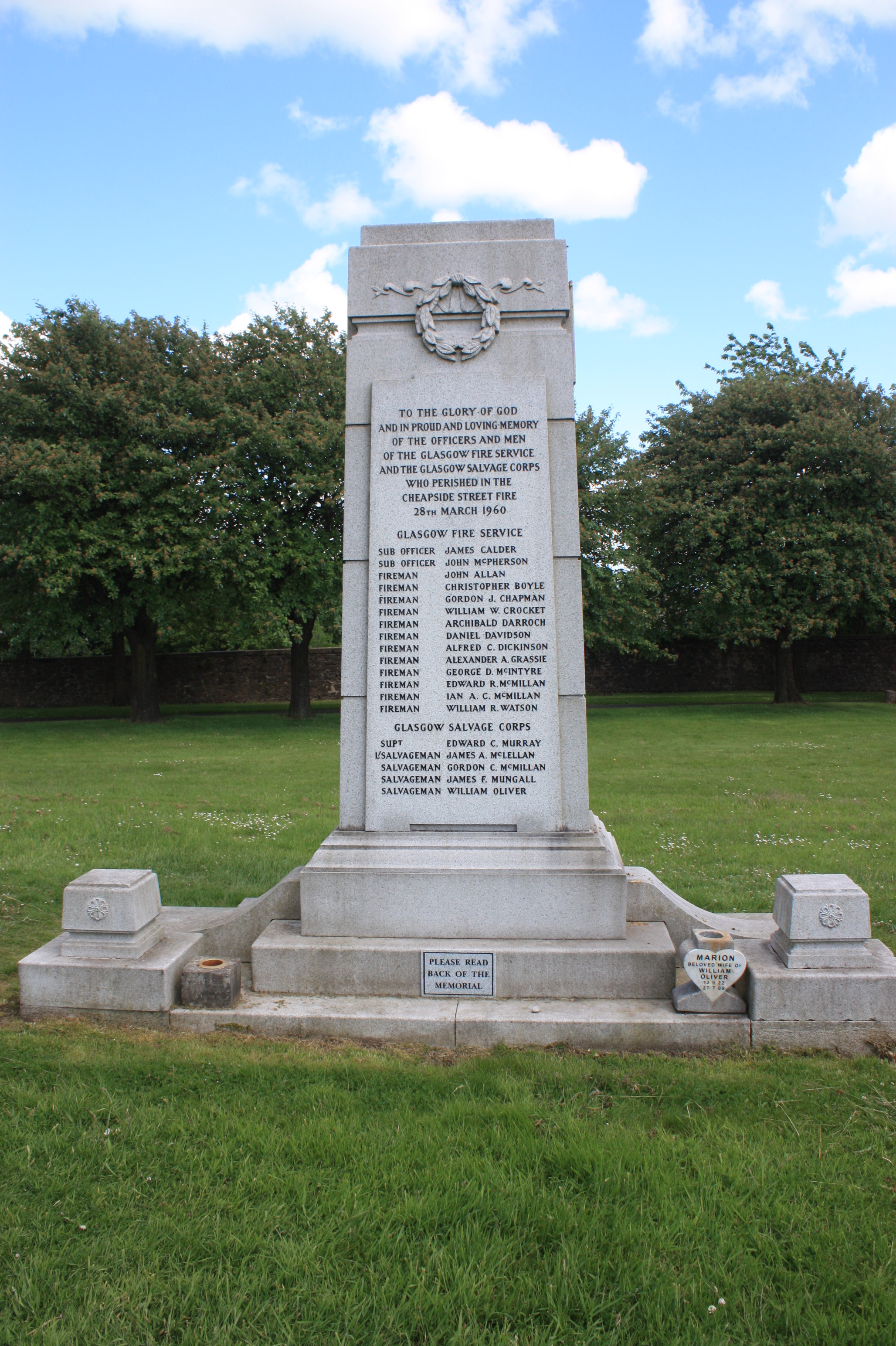
The memorial to those killed in the Cheapside Street Fire, Glasgow Necropolis

The following is a list of the firefighters and salvagemen who lost their lives in the line of duty on 28 March 1960 during this event:

=== Men from Glasgow Fire Service ===
- Fireman John Allan – Glasgow Fire Service
- Fireman Christopher Boyle – Glasgow Fire Service
- Fireman Gordon Chapman – Glasgow Fire Service
- Fireman William Crockett – Glasgow Fire Service
- Fireman Archibald Darroch – Glasgow Fire Service
- Fireman Daniel Davidson – Glasgow Fire Service
- Fireman Alfred Dickinson – Glasgow Fire Service
- Fireman Alexander Grassie – Glasgow Fire Service
- Fireman Ian McMillan – Glasgow Fire Service
- Fireman George McIntyre – Glasgow Fire Service
- Fireman Edward McMillan – Glasgow Fire Service
- Fireman William Watson – Glasgow Fire Service
- Sub Officer John McPherson – Glasgow Fire Service
- Sub Officer James Calder – Glasgow Fire Service

=== Men from Glasgow Salvage Corps ===
- Salvageman Gordon McMillan – Glasgow Salvage Corps
- Salvageman William Oliver – Glasgow Salvage Corps
- Salvageman James Mungall – Glasgow Salvage Corps
- Leading Salvageman James McLellan – Glasgow Salvage Corps
- Superintendent Edward Murray – Glasgow Salvage Corps

== Awards for bravery ==
Several awards for bravery were presented:

- Fireman James Dunlop (24 January 1929 – 28 September 2014) was awarded the George Medal.
- Station Officer Peter McGill who later retired as the Deputy Firemaster of Glasgow Fire Service in 1975 was awarded the George Medal
- Fireman John Nicholson was awarded the British Empire Medal for Gallantry
- Sub Officer Charles Neeson was awarded the British Empire Medal for Gallantry
- Fireman George Alexander was awarded the British Empire Medal for Gallantry
- Fireman William Watters was awarded the Queen's Commendation for Brave Conduct
- Fireman William Crockett's next of kin was awarded the Elizabeth Emblem

== Memorial services ==
The men who were killed were buried in the rubble, but were later laid to rest in the fire service tomb in Glasgow Necropolis. A memorial service is held on 28 March each year, with representatives of the fire service and Glasgow City Council present. Memorial services and other observations were held in 2010 to mark the 50th anniversary of the disaster. Due to the ban on mass gatherings during the COVID-19 pandemic, the 60th anniversary commemoration was a more limited affair, signified by a wreath-laying by Chief Officer Martin Blunden alone.

The reverse side of the monument remembers those firefighters lost in the Kilbirnie Street fire in 1972.

== The site today ==
The site of the warehouse largely remained derelict for many decades after its destruction, with the construction of the Kingston Bridge immediately adjacent at the end of the 1960s making the site unattractive to developers. By the mid-2020s however, the City Wharf high rise student housing development had been approved by Glasgow City Council. This will include a permanent memorial to those lost in the disaster.
