= Whisky bond =

Type of bonded warehouse

A whisky bond, a type of bonded warehouse, is a building where whisky on which excise duty has not yet been paid is stored under lock and key.

The Cheapside Street whisky bond fire in Glasgow on 28 March 1960 was Britain's worst peacetime fire services disaster.

There are four common types of bonded warehouses used for whisky casks: dunnage, racked, pallet, and rackhouse.

== Dunnage warehouses ==
A dunnage warehouse is the traditional type of warehouse used for maturing whisky in Scotland and some are still in use today. Dunnage warehouses are often on site at the distillery, or close nearby, and generally have a small capacity.

Dunnage warehouses are low in height with thick walls and an earth floor – the walls are traditionally stone, however some later warehouses are brick. They often have a slate tiled roof. The size of dunnage warehouses means that casks cannot be stacked more than three high and are laid on their side; this ensures good air circulation and an even maturation.

The earthen floor results in a humid atmosphere, and combined with the thick walls the humidity and temperature remain fairly consistent due to their insulating properties.

As dunnage warehouses are small and have low ceilings, machinery cannot be used to manage the casks. This increases the running costs of dunnage warehouses.

Dunnage warehouses are often the most familiar type of warehouse due to the fact that they are often located on distillery grounds and close to the stillhouse and are often contemporary to the construction of the distillery.

== Racked warehouses ==
As the whisky market grew and demand increased, dunnage warehouses were no longer sufficient to house the volume of whisky being produced. Racked warehouses are a response to this demand and are a modern style of warehouse that are much larger in size.

Racked warehouses have thinner walls and tin roofs, and are often much larger than dunnage warehouses. This, combined with the concrete flooring, allows casks to be stacked up to 12 high on their side on racks without the weight of the casks causing a problem.

The main problem with racked warehouses comes with the temperature and humidity regulation. The concrete floors of racked warehouses reduce the humidity compared to the earthen floor of a dunnage warehouse.

The concrete floors and thin walls allow a seasonal change in temperature in a racked warehouse which results in slight variations in the volume of the whisky during the course of a year. The expansion and contraction of the whisky in the cask can speed up the maturation process due to increases in contact with the wood of the cask.

The concrete floor of a racked warehouse also reduces the humidity which can speed up the maturation process. This can be a problem as the whisky may not have enough time in the cask to draw all the flavours from the wood.

In low-humidity environments, the rate of evaporation is higher for water than for alcohol, resulting in a smaller angel's share, with the alcohol strength actually rising in some cases.

The variations in temperature and humidity in a racked warehouse can result in unpredictable and uneven maturation. This is because casks at the bottom of a rack will be more humid and cooler in comparison to casks at the top which will be hotter but drier.

Racked warehouses are able to utilise machinery such as forklifts to move the casks, making the management of casks much less labour intensive. This reduces the costs of the warehouse and can make the end product cheaper too.

== Pallet warehouses ==
A pallet warehouse is a similar modern construction to the racked warehouse with one considerable difference: the casks are stored upright rather than on their side.

Evaporation rates within palletised casks are often much higher than dunnage or racked warehouses. So much so that a Dundee based company released a product called "Scotch Bonnet" to sit on the top of the casks in an effort to reduce evaporation.

Due to the structure of a pallet warehouse, being similar to that of a racked warehouse, and the fact that the casks are upright, a greater number of casks can be stored in a single warehouse, reducing costs.

== Rackhouse warehouses ==
A rackhouse is specifically the type of warehouses used for bourbon whiskey. Rackhouses are often very tall with metal roofs, and they are split into several floor levels each with up to three layers of casks.

The traditional structure of rackhouses is wooden timber which results in a warehouse that is very subject to external temperature changes. Incredibly hot summers and cold winters cause expansion and contraction of the whisky, increasing the interaction with the wood of the cask and expediting maturation.

The low humidity and high temperatures can increase the alcoholic strength of bourbon as in low humidity the water evaporates before the alcohol.

The conditions within a rackhouse can vary dramatically from area to area. The middle of the rackhouse remains fairly constant whereas the edges and the top of the rackhouse are considerably warmer. This is largely affected by the metal roof which is a conductor for the hot sun.

Historically, rackhouses would store casks up to a two-thirds capacity, leaving a third empty to rotate the casks through the different temperatures and humidity to achieve an even maturation. More recently, whisky from casks in different areas are vatted together to create a consistent whisky.

== How ownership is transferred at a bonded warehouse ==
There is no legal or legislative framework which outlines how ownership of a cask is passed from one person to another. However, the traditional method of transfer has been through a document termed a delivery order.

A delivery order is a document signed by both the buyer and the seller of the cask and addressed to the warehouse keeper. Upon receipt of the delivery order the warehouse keeper will perform their due diligence. Importantly, the warehouse keeper will have to check if the new owner of the goods is a revenue trader or not. If the new owner of the goods is a revenue trader they will need to apply for WOWGR registration as per Excise Notice 196. Excise notice 196 is the legislation which governs the storage of goods in duty suspended warehouses. In the context of Excise Notice 196 a Revenue Trade is defined as: “anyone carrying on a trade or business concerned with the buying, selling, importation, exportation, dealing in, or handling of excise goods, and the financing or facilitation of any such transactions or activities. Find a full definition in CEMA section 1.”

If the new owner of the cask is not a revenue trader then they do not require a WOWGR – as per section 5.1 Excise Notice 196: “All owners of duty-suspended excise goods must get approval and registration, unless...the owner of the excise goods is not a revenue trader”

In 2021, numerous whisky magazines and newspapers began writing about the subject of delivery orders in relation to the potential for fraud and scams. Specifically, they note that many private individuals who buy through cask investment companies do not receive a delivery order and consequently the new buyer does not have full autonomy over their casks. They argue that in order to prevent fraud, a delivery order is essential when a private individual purchases a cask.
