= London Salvage Corps =

British fire salvage organisation

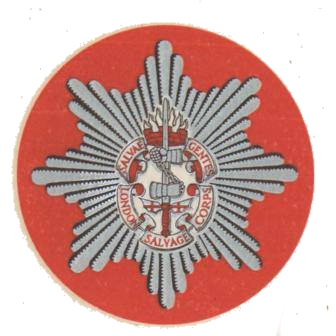
- Helmet Transfer for the LSC in the late 70s to early 80s before dissolving.
- Formation: 1865
- Dissolved: April 1984
- Type: Fire salvage and protection
- Legal status: Obsolete
- Purpose: Fire salvage and insurance protection
- Headquarters: Watling Street
- Location: London
- Services: Salvage goods and prevent insurance loss due to water from fire fighting

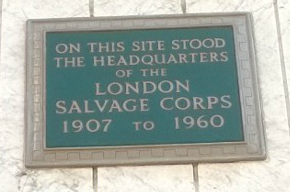
Memorial plaque on the side of the Salvage Corps headquarters, Watling Street, London.

The London Salvage Corps was maintained by the fire offices of London. The corps was first formed in 1865 and began operations in March 1866. It was inspired by the Liverpool Salvage Corps which had been formed in 1842, to reduce the loss and damage caused by fires, to help mitigate the effects of fire and of fire-fighting and to salvage both premises and goods affected by fire.

== History ==
The London Salvage Corps (LSC) had been around for as long as London's first properly organised fire brigade. The London Fire Engine Establishment had been created and maintained by the principal fire insurance offices of London. The London Fire Engine Establishment, established in 1833 under the command of Superintendent James Braidwood, had undertaken salvage work as part of its normal everyday fire extinguishing duties. Following Braidwood's death at the great Tooley Street fire in 1861, and the arrival of Captain Eyre Massey Shaw, a new fire brigade for London was required. It was created in 1866 and called the Metropolitan Fire Brigade, still with Captain Shaw as its first Chief Officer. However, the Metropolitan Fire Brigade Act 1865 was vague enough to enable the Metropolitan Board of Works, who controlled the new brigade at the time, to refuse responsibility for any salvage work without payment. The amount sought by the Metropolitan Board of Works for this service exceeded that for which an independent salvage corps could be maintained by the fire offices themselves. Therefore, it was decided at a meeting of the London Fire Engine Establishment on 22 December 1865 to establish a salvage corps independent of the Metropolitan Fire Brigade. The London Salvage Corps was founded by John Brookes Johnston of the Royal Insurance Company. The London Salvage Corps commenced operations during January 1866. The original subscribers to the London Salvage Corps were the Alliance, Atlas, Globe, Imperial, London, Protector, Royal Exchange, Sun, Union and Westminster fire offices, but membership varied subsequently.

The London Salvage Corps was maintained, and overseen by the fire offices of London. The staff of the corps, when formed, consisted of 64 salvagemen and officers. Since that time, owing to the many improvements that had taken place in the system of dealing with salvage, and the increase in the work to be done, the corps was strengthened, and the staff increased to 112 by the early 1970s. The various stations of the LSC were strategically placed, and "the Metropolis has been mapped out so that when a fire takes place it may be attended to at the earliest possible moment."

The early working staff (like its fire brigade counterparts) were mainly recruited from the navy. They consisted of the chief (salvage) officer and a superintendent, foreman and crew of men at each salvage station. The stations of the corps were initially connected by telegraph but were later connected by telephone with the fire brigade stations from whence the calls were received. In addition to the station staff, there were also salvage staff constantly employed during the daytime in inspecting docks, wharves, goods and London warehouses, with regular reports made weekly to the Insurance Committee.

== Headquarters and station locations ==
- No. 1 Station (B District) - headquarters situated at Watling Street - protected the City of London enclosed by Euston Road, Tottenham Court Road, City Road and the river Thames
- No. 2 Station (C District) - located on Commercial Road - covered whole of the eastern and north-eastern portion of London to the north of the Thames
- No. 3 Station (D District), opposite the headquarters of the Metropolitan Fire Brigade Station in Southwark Bridge Road, protected the whole of south London
- No. 4 station (A District), on Shaftesbury Avenue, covered the West End and Kensington This station transferred to the London Fire Brigade and became their Soho Fire Station. Following wartime bomb damage, it remained in use until 1983.
- No. 5 station, in Upper Street, Islington, protected the parish of Islington

A new headquarters was constructed for the London Salvage Corps at Aldersgate Street in 1960. Following the disbanding of the service in the 1980s, it transferred to the London Fire Brigade. The building was subsequently demolished and the site is now an office building

=== Advances in the Salvage Corps ===
The last horse drawn salvage tender was withdrawn in 1923, two years after the last of the London Fire Brigade's horses were retired from service at Kensington fire station. By May 1936 the LSC fleet consisted of seven Leyland 3-tonners that had been in operation since 1923. It also had a 30-cwt and a 5-cwt. van; the larger used for carrying extra waterproof clothes and other gear, whilst the smaller vehicle could be used for taking first-aid gear to smaller outbreaks and thus save the expense of turning out a major tender. One of the LSC tenders, which carried a crew of two, was equipped with a portable pump used for pumping out basements which had been flooded.

=== Services at fires ===
Services at fires formed the most important feature of the work. Much depended upon the method of dealing with the salvage. If, for instance, the upper part of a large Manchester goods warehouse was on fire, it would be of very little advantage to the offices interested in the risk if the men were set to work removing stock from the ground floor. The best method would be to cover up with tarpaulin all goods there, and prevent the water from collecting on the lower floors.

The most important work of the corps was to prevent damage to goods – the damage from fire was left almost entirely to the fire brigade. The "traps", which immediately on receipt of an alarm proceeded to the scene of the fire with their crew of men, carried every kind of apparatus for the saving of goods from destruction by fire or damage by water, as well as limelight apparatus for use in working after the fire had been extinguished – thus enabling the men to note the position of dangerous walls etc. They also carried portable coal-gas apparatus, which could be employed in the interior of buildings when the ordinary means of illumination had failed, and ambulance appliances for emergencies.

Prior to the outbreak of the Second World War the London Salvage Corps turned out on average seven times a day. The estimated cost of the eight principal fires in London for the first quarter of 1934 was £325,000. In its report to the insurance companies the LSC stated, "It is evident that the loss in material damage, trade and unemployment would have been much greater but for these activities."

The London Salvage Corps attended the massive Crystal Palace fire in 1936. Taken from the fire report, they sent three motor tenders and one motor car, 22 men and the LSC Chief Officer. Although not in the same numbers as their fire brigade counterparts, salvagemen also died in the line of duty.

=== Watching and working salvage ===
When a fire took place, a man was left behind in charge of the salvage if the property was insured. If there was uncertainty over whether the property was insured, but it appeared probable that it was, a man was left until the information was obtained later. The duty, if an important one, was divided into a day and night duty. This enabled an experienced man to be sent on day duty to meet the surveyor, and to carry out his instructions regarding the working out of the salvage; and a junior man at night. The day man, if working out salvage, would employ a number of men called strangers, over whom he acted as a kind of foreman. The working out might take the form of dividing up damaged goods into lots ready for a sale to be held by the surveyor, or of sifting over the debris to find remains of certain articles claimed for. If, for instance, a large fire occurred at a pianoforte manufacturers, and the debris was all in one common heap, the London Salvage Corps might have to arrange certain quantities of pegs and wires in order to give an idea of the number of pianos before the fire. The watching continued until the loss was settled, when the charge of the premises was given over to the assured.

== Scandal ==
During the 1930s the service was accused of participating in a criminal arson scandal. At the trial of Leopold Harris in 1934, he testified that he had had nearly every Salvage Corps officer "in his pocket". Harris was later sentenced to 14 years in jail. Captain Brymore Eric Miles, chief of the insurance companies' salvage corps was sentenced to four years in jail for "corruption and conspiring to pervert the administration of justice." The arson ring took £500,000 in false insurance claims.

== Ranks ==
The ranks of London Salvage Corps were an altered version of regular Fire Brigade/Fire Service Ranks.

Title	Chief Officer	Deputy Chief Officer	Superintendent	Deputy Superintendent	Station Officer	Sub-Officer	Leading Salvage Man	Salvage Man
Ranks								

== Closure ==
In the early 1980s meetings took place between the insurance office representatives, central government and the London Fire Brigade with a view to incorporating the services undertaken by the corps into the London Fire Brigade. Regardless of the loss of salvage skills an agreement was reached and the corps was disbanded in April 1984.

All of the LSC equipment, vehicles and Headquarters premises were offered to the London Fire Brigade, some of which was accepted and used. Due to reasons of age, recruiting conditions and staffing costs, very few of the salvagemen undertook retraining and were absorbed into the London Fire Brigade. Those remaining were offered early retirement (depending on their age and service) and the rest were made redundant.

== See also ==
- Glasgow Salvage Corps
- Liverpool Salvage Corps
- Salvage Corps
