= Blue Lagoon (Ekerö) =

Artificial lake in Sweden

Coordinates: 59°22′25″N 17°37′20″E

The Blue Lagoon or Husbygropen is an artificial lake just beside Mälaren in the island of Munsön in Ekerö municipality, Stockholm County. The lake is a decommissioned and finished gravel pit.

Since the end of the 19th century, large quantities of gravel was mined from Husbygropen. During the 1950s to the 1980s, large amounts of sand were collected by the landowner Jehander from Husbygropen. They dug down to just over 20 meters below Mälaren's water level and the pit was filled with water. Between the pit and Mälaren there is a narrow ridge and a sand dune was left in the north. At the end of the 1990s, mining in the area was finished and the pit has instead been transformed into a swimming lake. The water in Husbygropen is shimmering and clear, hence the name "Blue Lagoon".

In June 2019, there was confusion regarding responsibility for parking, cleaning and littering which led to the area being closed for car traffic.
