= Blue Lagoon (restaurant chain) =

Scottish fish and chip shop

- Industry: Restaurant
- Genre: Fast food
- Founded: 1975; 51 years ago in Glasgow, Scotland.
- Founders: Ersilio and Edda Varese
- Number of locations: 15
- Website: www.bluelagoonfishandchips.co.uk/index.html

Blue Lagoon is a Scottish fish and chip shop chain founded by Ersilio and Edda Varese in 1975. Originally in Glasgow, the business has since expanded to include 16 sites across Scotland. This currently includes stores in Glasgow, Perth, Stirling, and Ayrshire.

Their slogan is Think Fish and Chips, Think Blue Lagoon.

== History ==
Italian-born Ersilio and Edda Varese opened the first Blue Lagoon fish and chip shop on Sauchiehall Street in 1975. Ersilio had moved to Scotland in the 1960s. The business was taken over by their son, Angelo, before being passed down to the third generation of the Varese family, brothers Simone, Allesandro and Gianluca, who are the current owners.

In 2022, their 16th store was opened in Renfrew Street, Glasgow.

In 2026, planning was completed for their first shop outside of Scotland, located in Newcastle upon Tyne, with an original opening date scheduled for May 2026. However, the opening was delayed following the outbreak of the Union Street fire, which destroyed their Gordon Street branch. Despite the setback, the Newcastle branch is still expected to open before the end of 2026.

This fire brought the number currently operating down to 15.

The family also own the coffee shop chain Sexy Coffee.
