= Glasgow Fire Service =

Fire brigade in Glasgow, Scotland

Glasgow Fire Service provided emergency services such as fire prevention, firefighting, emergency medical services and technical rescue to Glasgow, the largest city in Scotland and the third-largest city in the United Kingdom. On 16 May 1975, the Glasgow Fire Service was absorbed into the now defunct Strathclyde Fire and Rescue Service.

== Formation and history ==
Glasgow has had an organised fire brigade since around 1643, when the earliest recorded reference to the purchase of leather buckets for firefighting is found. Merchant House’s bucket money receipts 1825-31 were given to the Police commissioner for fire extinguishing, but the Trades House's receipts did not go to the police for some reason.

The city appointed its first part-time paid superintendent in 1747. The fire brigade was known as the Glasgow Fire Brigade until the National Fire Service was formed in 1941.

Glasgow Fire Service was officially formed on 1 April 1948, by the Fire Services Act 1947. It was one of the eleven fire brigades established in Scotland after World War II, when these brigades were returned to the control of local authorities.

In May 1975, Glasgow Fire Service was absorbed into Strathclyde Fire Brigade as part of Scottish local government regionalisation.

In April 1984, the Glasgow Salvage Corps shut down after 111 years of service. They were merged into Strathclyde Fire Brigade.

Key events
Year	Event	Year	Event
1652	'Great Fire of Glasgow'	1870	First steam engine purchased
1657	First 'fire engine'	1891	100% full-time staffing of Brigade
1747	Part-time fire superintendent appointed	1905	First motorised fire engine purchased
1816	Full-time fire superintendent appointed	1913	Last Brigade horses (Kelvin and Tweed) sold

== Major incidents ==
Glasgow has a long history of major fires and other significant tragic incidents.

In 1190, a fire badly damaged Glasgow Cathedral and on 17 July 1652, the 'Great Fire of Glasgow' destroyed one-third of the city.

In February 1849, 65 people, almost all under the age of 20, were crushed to death in a panic caused by a small fire in the Theatre Royal in Dunlop Street. Forty years later, on 1 November 1889, 29 young women aged from 14 to 25 were killed when the Templeton's carpet factory in the east end of the city collapsed during high winds. A fire in a lodging house on Watson Street killed 39 men and injured another 24 on 19 November 1905. The iconic Kelvin Hall, built in 1901, was totally destroyed by fire on 7 July 1925. A fire in a fashion store on 4 May 1949, at 43 Argyle Street owned by Grafton's led to the deaths of thirteen young women, six of them teenagers.

Fires continued to plague the city throughout the late twentieth century, resulting in the deaths of many more civilians and firefighters.

On 16 March 1953, Glasgow's firefighters faced one of their most challenging incidents. A serious fire occurred at Leon & Co in Ballater Street, on the south side of the city, killing five male employees. The firefighters involved in the rescue were awarded three George Medals, two British Empire Medals for Bravery and three Queen's Commendations for Bravery – the largest number of civilian bravery awards ever awarded for a single incident at the time. In his annual report following the tragedy, Firemaster Chadwick C.B.E. recorded the awards as "....unprecedented in the history of the British Fire Service."

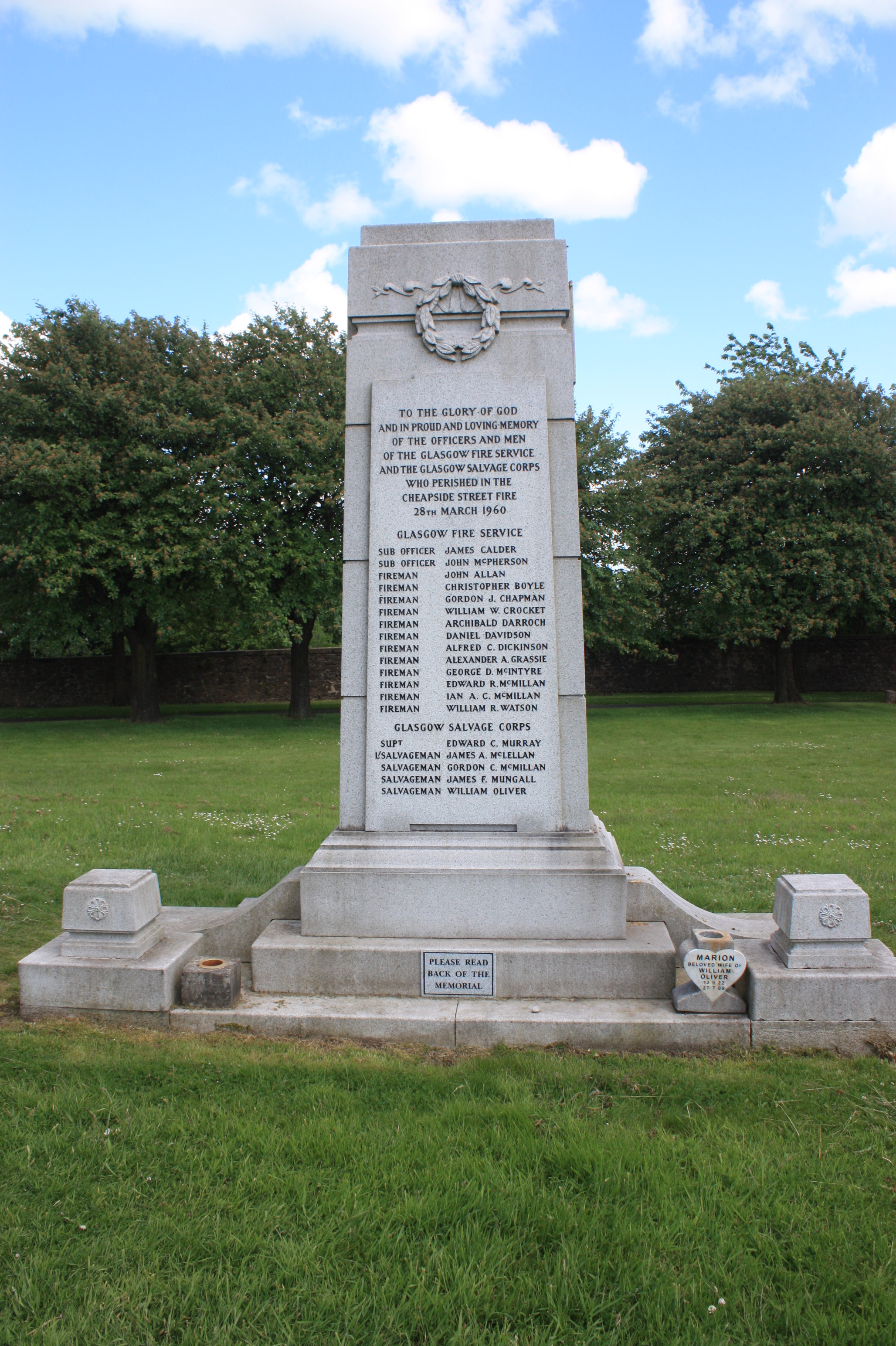
Cheapside and Kilbirnie Street Memorial

After a number of major fires in commercial premises in the 1960s, the media began referring to Glasgow as the 'Tinderbox City'.

On 28 March 1960, "the worst disaster in the peacetime history of the British Fire Service" took place. At 7:15 that night, a 999 call reported a fire at 130 Cheapside Street and three minutes later the first fire engines and a tender from Glasgow Salvage Corps arrived. The details of this fire are well documented elsewhere, but it is notable for the loss of fourteen Glasgow firefighters and five salvagemen from the Glasgow Salvage Corps, and the heroism of their colleagues. Station Officer (later Deputy Firemaster) Peter J McGill and Fireman (later Divisional Officer) James M Dunlop were awarded George Medals for their bravery. Sub Officer Charles Neeson and Firemen John Nicholson and George B Alexander were awarded British Empire Medals, and Fireman William Watters was awarded a Queen's Commendation for Brave Conduct. Although this event is remembered as the Cheapside Street disaster, sixteen of the nineteen fatalities lost their lives in Warroch Street.

On 26 October 1962, another of Glasgow's cultural heritage buildings, the St Andrew's Halls, suffered significant damage from a major fire that left only one facade of the building intact.

On 18 November 1968, twenty-two people died in a fire at A J & S Stern's furniture factory in James Watt Street. Crews arrived within four minutes of the 999 call made at 10:31 am but could not save the occupants, who were trapped behind barred windows and locked fire escapes.

On 2 January 1971, crews from across Glasgow attended the Ibrox disaster that caused 66 deaths and over 200 injuries.

1972 saw the final chapter in the tragic loss of Glasgow firefighters. On 25 August that year, seven Glasgow Fire Service personnel died in the line of duty while trying to rescue a trapped colleague at a warehouse fire at 70/72 Kilbirnie Street. Those killed ranged in service from just over one year to twenty-four years, with the youngest victim aged 20. The courage displayed at Kilbirnie Street led to eleven awards of the Glasgow Corporation Medals for Bravery and a Queen's Commendation for Brave Conduct.

On 18 November 1972, the service was called to a fire in a disused shop in Maryhill Road. Here, Sub Officer Adrian McGill became the last Glasgow firefighter to lose his life protecting the citizens of the city. While attempting to rescue a woman who was trapped, Sub Officer McGill removed his breathing apparatus to give it to her. He succumbed to smoke inhalation and was awarded a posthumous Queen's Commendation for Brave Conduct and the Glasgow Corporation Medal for Bravery. The service rescued fifteen people from the fire by ladders and led over 200 to safety through smoke.

Excluding National Fire Service casualties caused by enemy action, forty Glasgow firefighters lost their lives firefighting in 'Tinderbox City', from the loss of four men at W & R Hatrick's Chemical Works in Renfield Street in 1898 to Sub Officer McGill at Maryhill Road in 1972.

== Glasgow's Firemasters 1809–1975 ==
Name	From	To	Name	From	To
Basil Aitchison	1809	1816	William Patterson	1884	1907
James Black	1816	1824	John McColl	1907	1909
James Davidson	1824	1833	William Waddell	1909	1928
Peter McGregor	1833	1835	James Marshall	1928	1936
William Roberts	1835	1847	Charles Angus	1936	1940
Charles Forsyth	1847	1849	Martin Chadwick	1940	1961
Alex Turner	1849	1855	John Swanson	1961	1965
James Bryson	1855	1884	George Cooper	1965	1975

== Glasgow Fire Service: Fire Stations (as at 1974) ==
A Division	B Division	C Division
A.1 Central	B.1 South	C.1 North West
A.2 East	B.2 Govan	C.2 Knightswood
A.3 Parkhead	B.3 Pollok	C.3 Partick
A.4 Easterhouse	B.4 Castlemilk	C.4 West
A.5 Springburn	B.5 Queens Park	C.5 North
		C.M. Fire Boat
		C.6 Anderston
