= New York Fire Patrol =

Salvage corps in New York City

Agency overview
- Established: 1803 / 1839
- Dissolved: 2006
- Employees: 100
- Staffing: Career
- Fire chief: Richard Heffernan
- Motto: "Always Ready"

Facilities and equipment
- Stations: 3 (Peak of 10)
- Squads: 3 (Peak of 10)

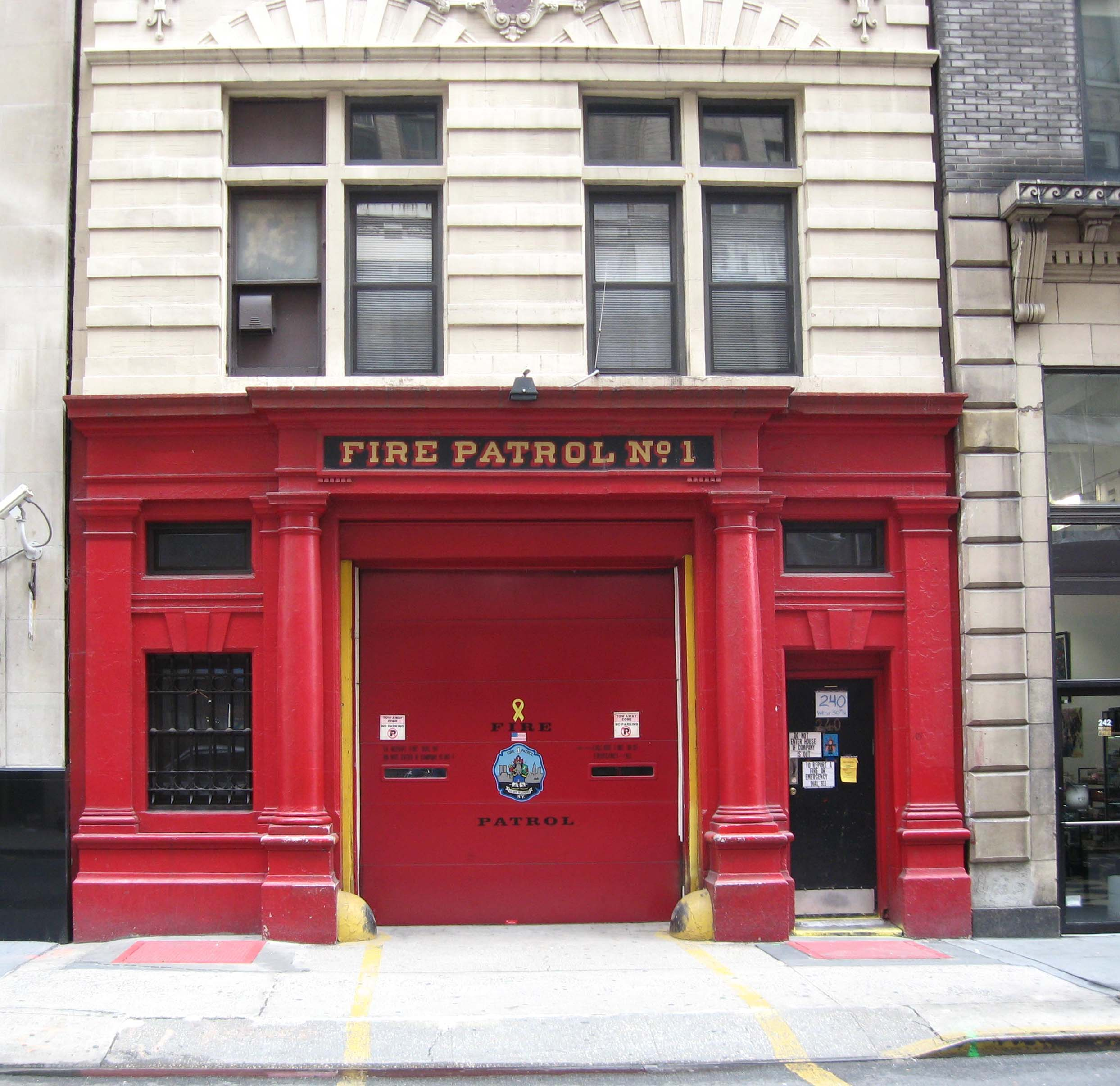
Fire Patrol House #1 in Midtown

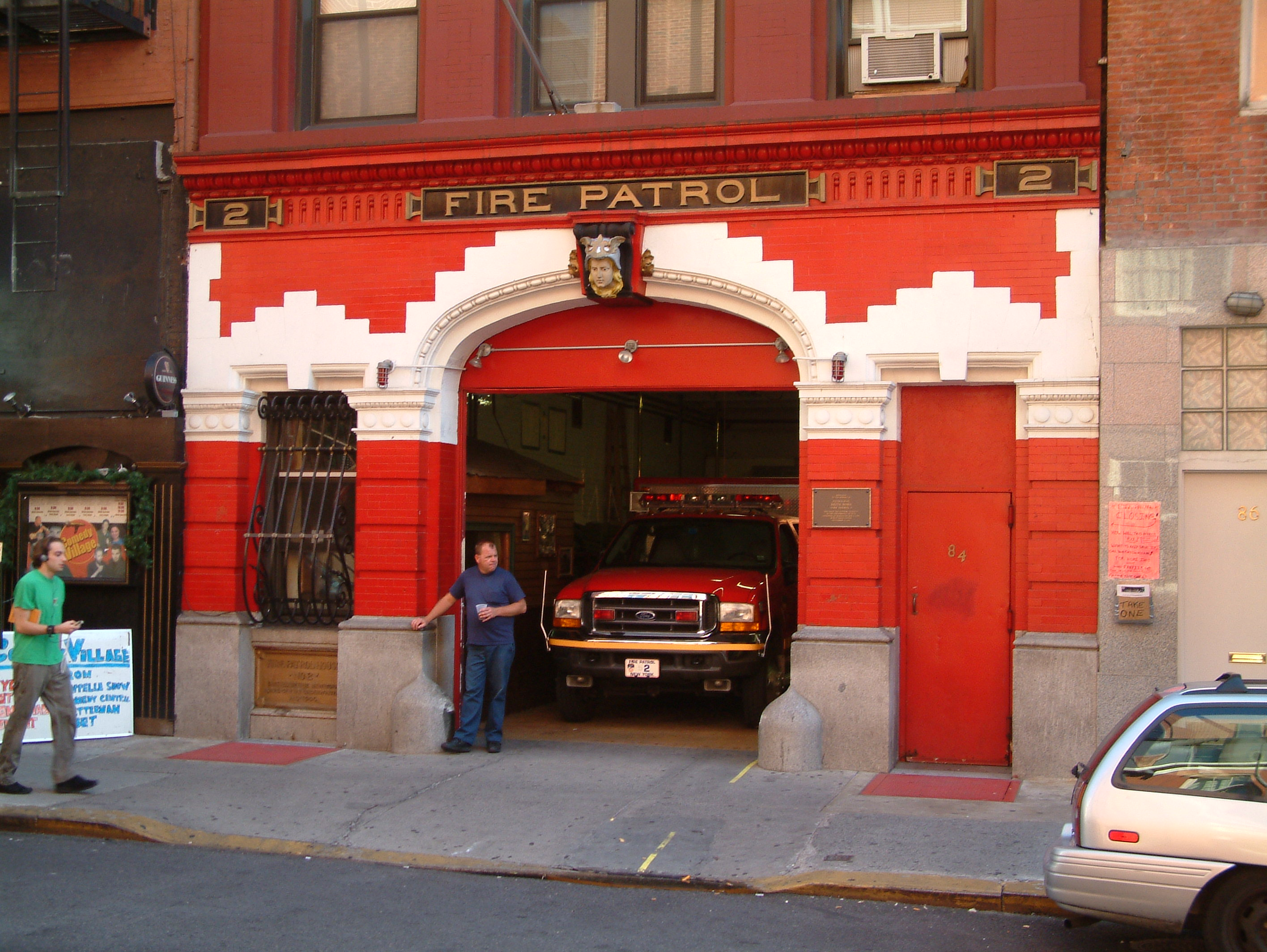
Fire Patrol House #2 in Greenwich Village before its closing in 2006

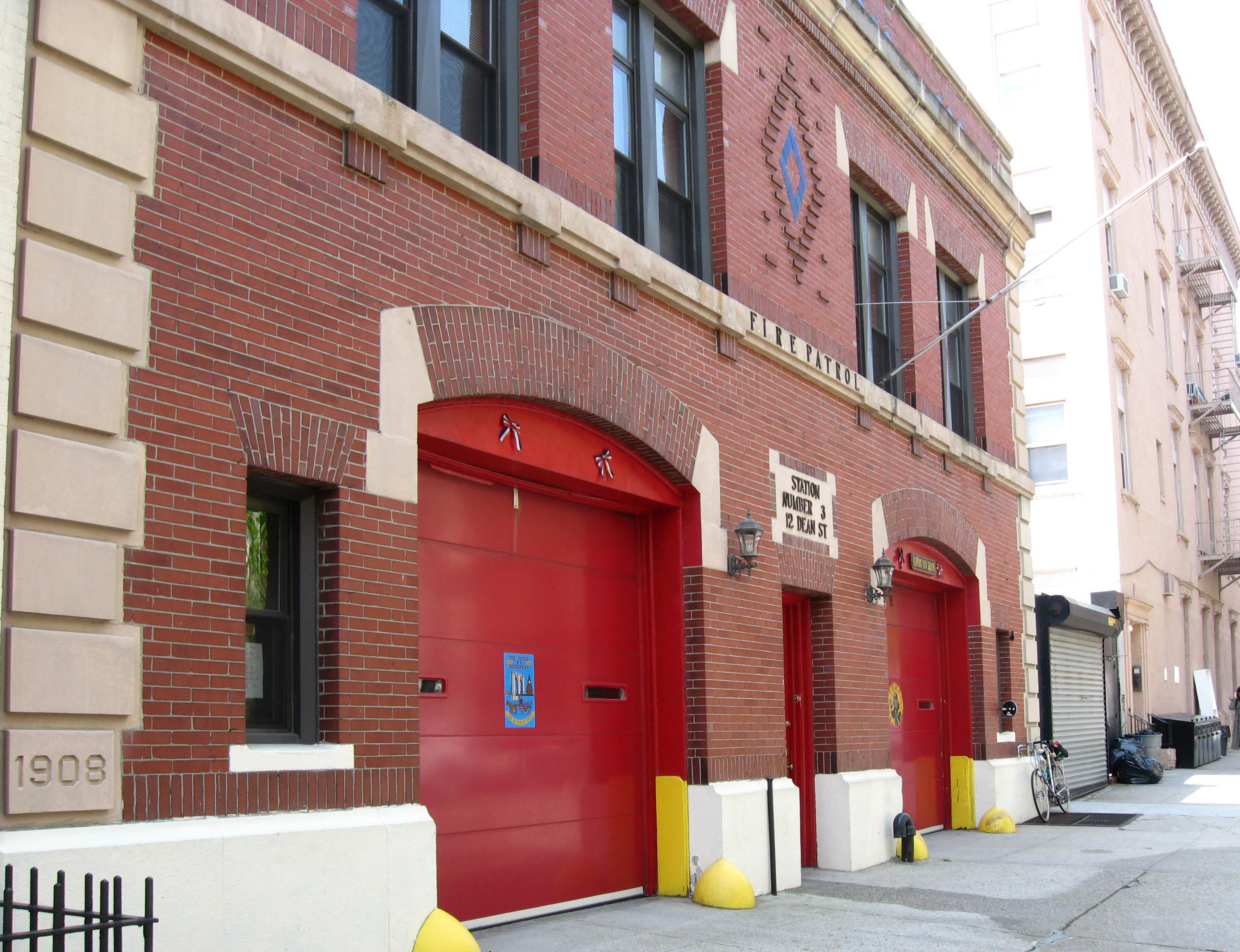
Fire Patrol House #3 in Brooklyn

The New York Fire Patrol (FPNY) was a salvage corps created by the New York Board of Fire Underwriters which operated from 1839 until October 15, 2006. Their original mission was two-fold: to discover fires and to prevent losses to insured properties. The Patrol responded primarily to fires at commercial structures, however they would respond to high loss residential fires at times. During the fire the Patrol would spread canvas salvage covers, remove water, operate elevators, and secure utilities. The New York Fire Patrol was organized under the International Association of Fire Fighters (IAFF) labor union as Local I-26.

== Operations ==
The Patrol's primary purpose was to reduce fire damage. During a fire, the Patrol would prevent further damage to facilities and equipment, with the goal of reducing insurance claims for the damaged goods but more importantly saving business stock and often owner's livelihoods. Over the years, they grew adept at preventing water damage by immediately pumping out excess water from fire department hoses, preventing computer and electronics damage by covering and removing equipment as soon as possible, and preventing damage from the elements by covering broken windows and doors with tarps as soon as possible. The Patrol was also credited with saving hundreds of lives from burning buildings throughout the five boroughs over the course of two hundred years. In the late 20th century the Patrol was reduced to three Patrol Houses, one each in Midtown and Downtown Manhattan and one in Cobble Hill, Brooklyn, which was responsible for Brooklyn, Queens and Staten Island. Throughout their history, 32 patrolmen died in the line of duty, including Keith M. Roma, Badge 120, on September 11, 2001.

== Discontinuance ==
Despite appeals to the New York Board of Fire Underwriters and the City Council, the Fire Patrol's "ratchets rang for the last time" at 0800 on October 15, 2006. The New York Fire Patrol became the last of all the insurance-supported salvage corps to operate in the United States.

In 2010, it was reported that CNN anchor Anderson Cooper purchased the former house of Fire Patrol 2 in Greenwich Village for $4.3 million. He planned to turn it into a home, according to the New York Post.

== Patrol locations and apparatus ==
List of FPNY houses at the time the organization was disbanded in 2006

- Patrol 1 – 240 W. 30th St. – Midtown, Manhattan
  - Fire Patrol 1
- Patrol 2 – 84 W. 3rd St. – Greenwich Village, Manhattan
  - Fire Patrol 2
- Patrol 3 – 12 Dean St. – Cobble Hill, Brooklyn
  - Fire Patrol 3
  - Patrol Support Unit
  - Reserve Patrol Unit (2)

List of FPNY houses disbanded before 2006

- Patrol 4 – 33 Stagg St. (1876–1959)
- Patrol 5 – 109 West 121st St. (1079 Nelson Ave. for a short time) (1892–1955)
- Patrol 6 – 1079 Nelson Ave. (1901–1955)
- Patrol 7 – 133 Norfolk St. (1906–1933)
- Patrol 8 – 12 Dean St. (dates unknown)
- Patrol 9 – 33 Stagg St. (1911–1955)
- Patrol 10 – 516 Herkimer St. (1911–1954)

== See also ==
- Liverpool Salvage Corps
- London Salvage Corps
