= Sarah Murray =

Sarah Murray may refer to:

- Sarah Murray (travel writer) (1744–1811), English travel writer
- Sarah Murray (priest) (born 1970), Scottish Episcopal priest and Provost of Inverness Cathedral
- Sarah Murray (ice hockey) (born 1988), ice hockey player and coach
- Sarah Jane Murray, Irish-born academic, screenwriter and filmmaker
