= Ted Baehr =

American Christian film critic

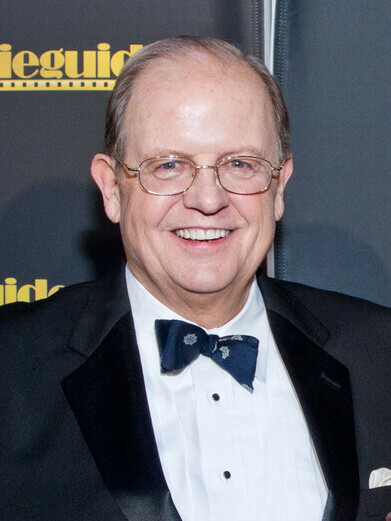
- Baehr in 2015
- Born: Millard Robert E. Theodore Baehr; 1946 (age 79–80); New York City, New York, United States
- Education: Dartmouth College; New York University
- Occupation: Media critic
- Title: Chairman of the Christian Film and Television Commission
- Children: 4
- Father: Irvine E. Theodore Baehr

Millard Robert E. Theodore Baehr (born 1946) is an American media critic and chairman of the Christian Film and Television Commission, a division of Good News Communications, Inc. He is publisher and editor-in-chief of Movieguide, a website and biweekly journal that evaluates motion pictures and other entertainment products from a Christian perspective on suitability for family consumption. He also hosts nationally and internationally syndicated Movieguide radio and television programs.

== Personal life ==
Born in 1946, Baehr is the son of Irvine E. Theodore Baehr, an actor who worked as Robert (Tex) Allen, and actress Evelyn Peirce. He was raised in New York City, gaining experience acting in commercials, motion pictures, television and on stage. During his twenties, Baehr met and began dating Lili, whom he would later marry. The couple has four children and resides in Southern California. Baehr is an evangelical Christian.

== Education and career ==
After studying at several universities in Europe, Baehr graduated summa cum laude in comparative literature and as a Rufus Choate Scholar from Dartmouth College. He then received a Juris Doctor degree from the New York University School of Law, where he served as Editor of the NYU Law School newspaper.

In 1975, at the encouragement of a friend, Baehr read the Bible, which changed the direction of his life and career. He applied to the Institute of Theology at the Cathedral of St. John the Divine and received his Doctor of Humanities degree from Belhaven College. He became the Director of the Television Center at the City University of New York. While there researching the impact of media in education, he also launched his first ministry, the Good News Communications, Inc. ministry.

In 1979 he was elected President of the Episcopal Radio and Television Foundation and began conceptualizing the Christian Film & Television Commission. He also served on the Communications Board of the National Council of Churches. It was during this time that he met the former director of the Protestant Film Office, George Heimrich and was inspired to resurrect the activities of that group, which, until it was closed in 1966, had participated heavily in "approving" scripts of the major Hollywood studios for compliance with the MPAA's self-imposed Production Code.

Ted has been featured on shows such as Oprah, Hannity & Colmes, CNN, ABC, Fox News, AMC Specials, Entertainment Tonight, and The 700 Club. His opinions have been featured in major newspapers and magazines, including the Wall Street Journal, The New York Times, Time, USA Today, the Los Angeles Times, The Washington Post, The Hollywood Reporter, and U.S. News & World Report.

He has given lectures at the European Parliament, Parliament of the UK, the Parliament of Norway, the Parliament of the Philippines, as well as at Oxford, Dartmouth College, University of Virginia, Yale University, UC Berkeley, and UCLA. He taught at the Bombay Communication Institute. Ordained as a bishop in the Independent Christian Churches International and in the International Ministerial Fellowship, Baehr has preached throughout the world.

== Movieguide and CFTVC ==
In 1985 Baehr began publishing Movieguide as a biweekly magazine of movie reviews, which has now expanded to an online database of movie reviews. Movieguide's reviews use a "Biblical perspective" and are aimed at helping parents use informed judgment when deciding what entertainment products are suitable for their families' enjoyment.

In 1986 Baehr founded The Christian Film & Television Commission (CFTVC), which encourages the major media companies to produce "wholesome, family entertainment." By cross-indexing Movieguide's moral criteria with box office statistics, Baehr's commission produces an annual Report To The Entertainment Industry which attempts to prove that the American public prefers "wholesome, worthwhile, moral movies." The Report also includes a listing of the ten best "family friendly films" and ten best "morally edifying mature audience films" of the year, all of which are awarded plaques at Movieguide's annual award show.

The medievalist Sarah-Jane Murray is among those who have written for Movieguide.

According to the New Yorker, Movieguide is a large database that monitors and rates movies on faith-based content. Funding from right-wing lobbyists resulted in increased policization of their reviews and awards which promote "increas[ing] man's love and understanding of God" and disparage content as "humanist", "feminist", "environmentalist", "PC" ("politically correct worldview or elements"), and "Ho" ("homosexual worldview or sexuality"").

=== Movieguide ratings ===
Movieguide rates movies for both quality and acceptability. Quality ratings (1 to 4 stars) cover production value, entertainment quality, and technical or narrative accomplishment. Acceptability ratings (range from +4 to −4, or exemplary to abhorrent) include evaluation of moral and theological issues, based on a "traditional view of the Bible and Christianity." The content of a movie is evaluated for acceptability based on its "dominant worldview" (biblical, Christian, environmentalist, humanist, romantic, socialist, homosexual, false religion, New Age / Pagan, etc.) and on secondary elements, (hints of worldview, foul language, violence, sex, nudity, alcohol, smoking/drugs, miscellaneous immorality, or miscellaneous philosophical or theological problems).

=== The Movieguide Awards ===
Every year since 1993, Movieguide hosts an "Annual Faith and Values Awards Gala" in Beverly Hills, California. According to Movieguide the purpose of the Gala is to "[encourage] filmmakers and television producers to bring the brightest, most uplifting and inspirational movies and television to audiences world-wide." The gala includes the presentation of:

- 10 Best Films for Family Audiences
- 10 Best Films for Mature Audiences
- The Faith and Freedom Awards (for promoting positive American values)
- The Grace Awards (for outstanding performances exemplifying God's grace and mercy)
- The Kairos Prize ($50,000 prize for spiritually uplifting screenplays by beginning or first-time screenwriters)
- The Epiphany Prizes ($100,000 prizes for the most inspiring film and television program)
- Special Faith & Values Crystal Teddy Bear Awards

The $100,000 Epiphany Prizes and the $50,000 Kairos Prizes are supported by grants from the John Templeton Foundation founded by the late Sir John Templeton, who personally discussed the creation of the Annual Movieguide Awards and the Epiphany Prizes with Baehr.

In addition to the awards, Baehr presents the "Report to the Entertainment Industry", an annual analysis of the past year's movies and their gross financial earnings in North America, internationally and in home video sales. The report includes articles about each of the Gala's award winners, an analysis of the Top 25 movies at the box office in North America during the previous calendar year, the top movies overseas earning $100 million or more during the calendar year, and an analysis of the top DVD sales for the previous calendar year. It analyzes these movies based on the various categories and letter codes of the Movieguide rating system. The report then presents statistics on various cultural topics including: Hollywood demographics, world religions, faith in America, charity in America, the family, children and media, internet, and media wisdom. The report concludes with the "Twenty Most Unbearable Movies" of the past year. Movieguide uses this analysis and statistics in the report to attempt to convince studio executives and filmmakers that producing "family-friendly" and "spiritually uplifting", "redemptive" and even positive Christian content can significantly increase the earnings of their movies. The Movieguide Awards now air on the Hallmark Channel annually.

=== Highlights of the Report to the Entertainment Industry ===
All major movies released each year on the big screen in the United States, usually the top 250 to top 275 depending on how many movies the major studios in Hollywood and the major independents release, are included in the annual Report to the Entertainment Industry. The results are presented to industry executives at a Hollywood awards gala one week or so before the Academy Awards.

According to the annual report for 2010 movies, "Movies that fit Movieguide's high Christian, moral, biblical, theological, spiritual, production, aesthetic, and entertainment principles, values, and standards do much better than those movies consistently violating those principles, values, and standards."

=== Alleged conflict of interest ===
A March 2004 article by Marshall Allen in Christianity Today claimed that Baehr's public relations company Kairos Marketing\ accepted payment for consulting and promotional activities on behalf of six movies that were positively reviewed in Movieguide. Though Kairos is not part of Good News Communications, the non-profit that supports the CFTVC and publishes Movieguide, Kairos does donate to Good News Communications. The article quotes David P. Gushee, an ethicist then at Union University in Tennessee as saying that accepting money to promote movies and publishing reviews of those movies in a magazine that "presents itself as a Hollywood watchdog" is a conflict of interest.

Baehr contends otherwise. He states that the CFTVC primarily functions as an advocacy group, with the end goal of "redeeming the values of the mass-media." Reviewing films in order to advise filmmakers and educate the public is only one aspect of the ministry's overall goal to promote a "redeemed Hollywood". Supporting moral movies through advertising is another.

We've lent our expertise to many movies – gratis, for the sake of helping God's kingdom advance in this industry. In a few cases, after we approve of and review the movie according to our stringent criteria, we have been remunerated for our services through a sister organization set up for this purpose to help underwrite the extra time these promotional efforts required.

Further rebuttal from CFTVC advisory board member Jane Chastain in World Net Daily countered that the Christianity Today article was a slanderous "hatchet job", noting that the Protestant Film Office, the ideological predecessor to Baehr's organizations, was routinely paid for consultations by Hollywood Studios that needed its stamp of approval. Other rebuttals followed, including one from Pat Boone, published in Christianity Today, lamenting that publication's decision to attack rather than aid a fellow Christian organization in light of a perceived problem. Christianity Today did not officially retract its criticisms, but it removed the article from its website and published a reply by Baehr about his organization and the allegations against it.

== Awards ==
Baehr has received the Eagle Award by Western National Religious Broadcasters for his positive impact on the secular entertainment industry; the Educational Policy Conference Award; five Angel Awards from Excellence in Media; a Chicago Intercom Silver Plaque; the prestigious Wilbur Award; three awards from the Southern California Motion Picture Council; the President's Award from ICVA/ICCM; the Religious Heritage of America Faith and Freedom Award; the Covenant Award from the Radio Television Commission of the Southern Baptist Convention; the Hollywood Anti-Pornography Coalition Award; and the Knights of Columbus Gold Plaque, "in recognition of continued high standards and commitment to attaining wholesome family values".

== Books ==
- Baehr, Theodore (November 1986) Getting the Word Out: How to Communicate the Gospel in Today's World. HarperCollins. ISBN 0-06-060326-7
- Baehr, Ted (December 1989) The Christian Family Guide to Movies and Video. Wolgemuth & Hyatt Publishing. ISBN 0-943497-62-0
- Baehr, Theodore & Susan Wales, editors. (January 2003) Faith in God and Generals: An Anthology of Faith, Hope, and Love in the American Civil War. B&H Publishing Group. ISBN 0-8054-2728-7
- Baehr, Ted (June 1, 2003) What Can We Watch Tonight? Zondervan Press. ISBN 0-310-24770-5
- Baehr, Ted (January 30, 2005) So You Want To Be In Pictures?: A Christian Resource for "Making It" in Hollywood. B&H Publishing Group. ISBN 0-8054-3192-6
- Baehr, Theodore (January 31, 2005) The Media-wise Family. Media-Wise Publishing. ISBN 0-9753455-5-9
- Baehr, Theodore and James Baehr. (September 23, 2005) Narnia Beckons: C. S. Lewis's 'The Lion, the Witch, and the Wardrobe' and Beyond. B&H Publishing Group. ISBN 0-8054-4042-9
- Baehr, Ted and Tom Snyder (January 30, 2006) Frodo & Harry: Understanding Visual Media and Its Impact on Our Lives. Media-Wise Publishing. ISBN 0-9753455-7-5
- Baehr, Ted with Ken & Susan Wales. (January 2007) The Amazing Grace of Freedom: The Inspiring Faith of William Wilberforce, the Slaves' Champion. New Leaf Press. ISBN 978-0-89221-673-4
- Baehr, Ted and Pat Boone. (February 2007) The Culture-Wise Family. Regal Books. ISBN 978-0-8307-4305-6
- Baehr, Ted (April 2011) How to Succeed in Hollywood (Without Losing Your Soul): A Field Guide for Christian Screenwriters, Actors, Producers, Directors, and More. WND Books. ISBN 978-1-936488-27-8
- Ted Baehr wrote the first chapter,Transforming the Mass Media of Entertainment, for the book Redeeming the Screens, DeFazio, Jeanne, William David Spencer coeditors (2016), Wipf & Stock Publishers. ISBN 978-1-4982-3448-1
