= St Mary's Cathedral, Glasgow =

St Mary's Cathedral
- The Cathedral Church of Saint Mary the Virgin
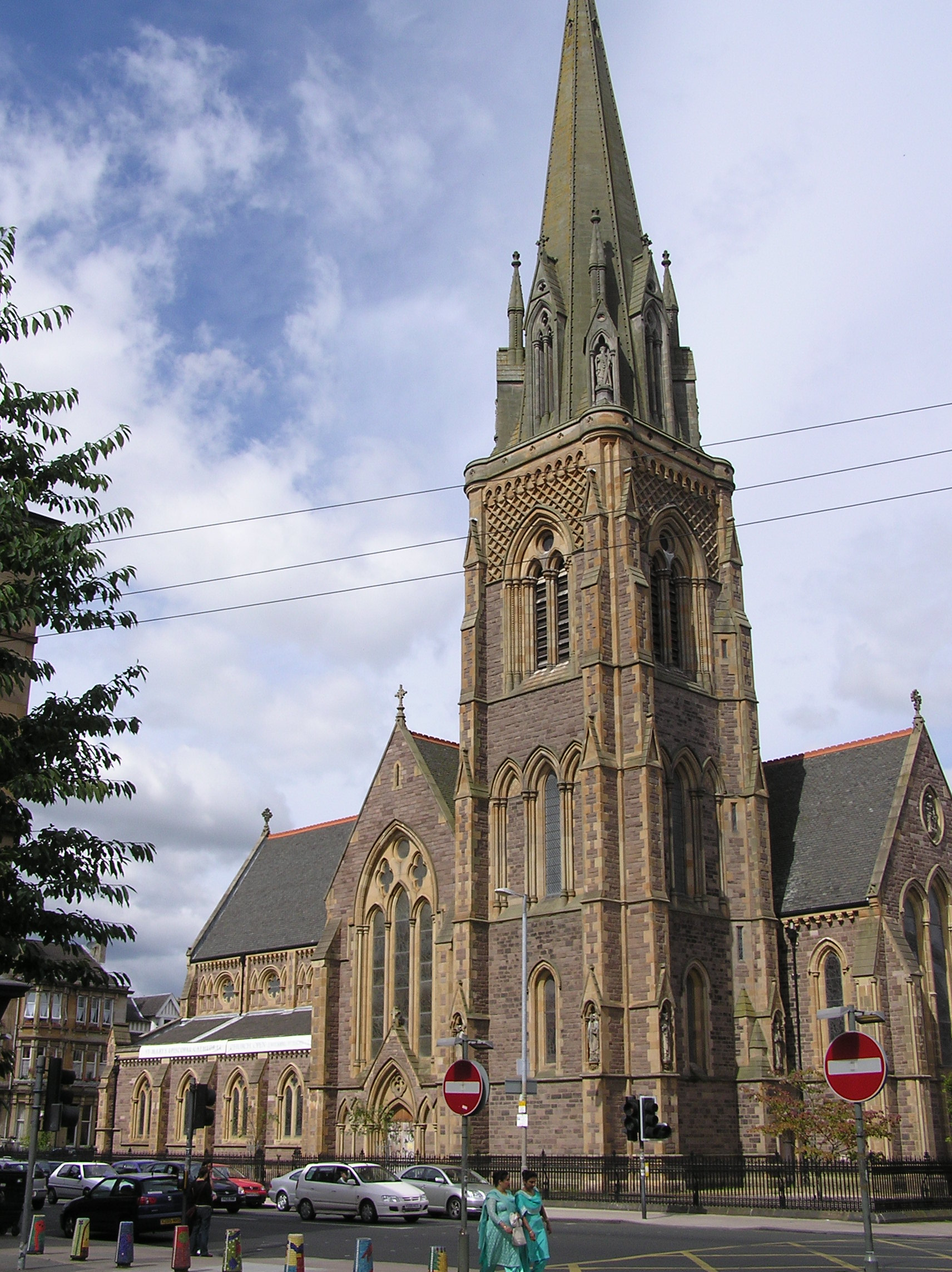
- Saint Mary's Cathedral, Glasgow
- St Mary's Cathedral
- 55°52′25″N 4°16′30″W
- Location: 300 Great Western Road, Glasgow G4 9JB
- Country: Scotland
- Denomination: Scottish Episcopal Church
- Churchmanship: Anglo-Catholic
- Website: Cathedral Website

History
- Status: Active
- Dedication: Virgin Mary
- Consecrated: October 1894

Architecture
- Functional status: Cathedral & Parish church
- Architect: George Gilbert Scott
- Architectural type: Church
- Style: Gothic Revival
- Groundbreaking: 1871
- Completed: 1893

Administration
- Diocese: Glasgow and Galloway
- Parish: Cathedral congregation

Clergy
- Bishop: Nicholas Bundock
- Abbot: Sarah Shaw
- Succentor: Dawn Matthew
- Priest(s): John Riches; Chuks Iwuagwu; Maggie McTernan; Ivan Draper; Ellen Barrett

Listed Building – Category A
- Designated: 15 December 1970
- Reference no.: LB32198

The Cathedral Church of St Mary the Virgin, commonly called St Mary's Cathedral, is a cathedral of the Scottish Episcopal Church. It is located on the Great Western Road, in the west end of Glasgow, Scotland. The current building was opened on 9 November 1871 as St Mary's Episcopal Church and was completed in 1893 when the spire was completed. The architect was Sir Gilbert Scott. It was raised to cathedral status in 1908. The total height of the cathedral is 63 metres. The church structure is protected as a category A listed building.

The other cathedrals in Glasgow are St Andrew's (Roman Catholic), St Luke's (Eastern Orthodox) and St Mungo's, the city's mediaeval cathedral, now used by the Church of Scotland, which has a presbyterian polity and does not use the term ‘cathedral’ to describe its churches.

== Rector and provost ==
The twin roles of rector of the congregation and provost of the cathedral are carried out by one person. The candidate for the post of rector and provost is nominated as rector by the vestry on behalf of the congregation and elected as provost by the bishop meeting in chapter. Frederic Llewellyn Deane was the first provost in 1908, four years after becoming rector. His successor, Ambrose Lethbridge, became provost in 1918, a year after being installed as rector. Following the sudden death of Bishop Goldie in October 1980, the installation of Malcolm Grant as rector and provost was delayed until after the enthronement of Bishop Rawcliffe in spring 1981. Kelvin Holdsworth was installed as rector and provost on 31 May 2006, the Feast of the Visitation.

=== Previous rectors and provosts ===
- Richard Samuel Oldham

Junior Incumbent 1851 to 1859; Sole Incumbent 1859 to 1878; Dean of the Diocese 1877 to 1879

- Frederic Edward Ridgeway

Rector 1878 to 1890; Dean of the Diocese 1888 to 1890

- Richard Howel Brown

Rector 1890 to 1904

- Frederic Llewellyn Deane

Rector 1904 to 1917; First Provost 1908 to 1917

- Ambrose Lethbridge

Rector 1917 to 1927; Provost 1918 to 1927

- Algernon Giles Seymour – 1927 to 1933
- Kenneth Charles Harman Warner – 1933 to 1938
- John Gabriel Murray – 1938 to 1944
- Martin Patrick Grainge Leonard – 1944 to 1953
- Frank Fairbairn Laming – 1953 to 1966
- Hugh McIntosh – 1966 to 1970
- Harold Chad Mansbridge – 1971 to 1980
- Malcolm Etheridge Grant – 1981 to 1991

(also Assistant Curate 1969 to 1972)

- Peter Francis – 1992 to 1996
- Philip (Griff) Dines – 1997 to 2005

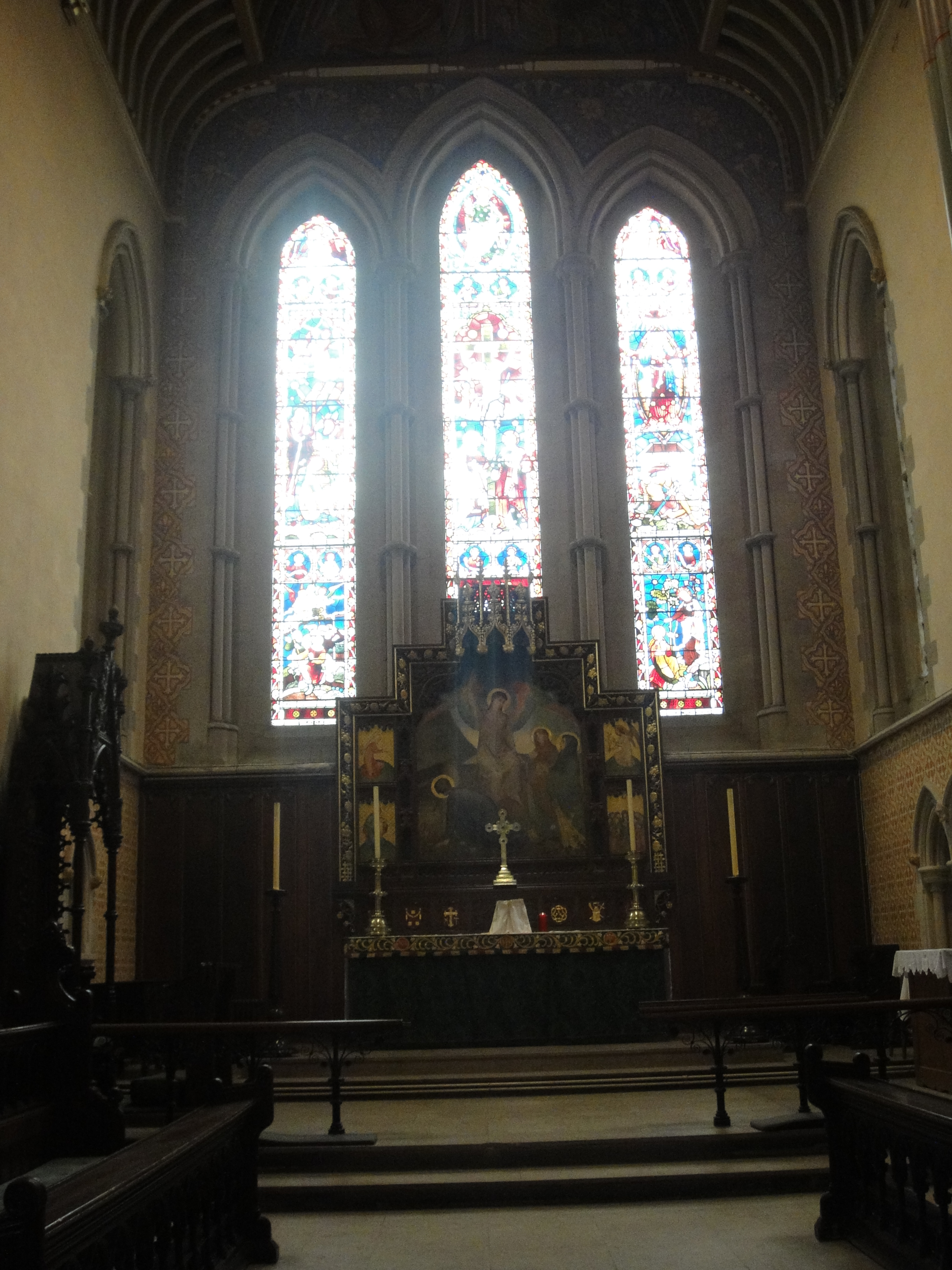
High altar of the cathedral

== Congregation ==
St Mary's combines two roles, as the cathedral for the diocese and as a large urban congregation. Members are drawn from a wide area in and around the city of Glasgow. There is active lay-participation in worship and in administrative and outreach activities. The turnover of the congregation is high.

== Music and the arts ==
St Mary's enjoys a strategic position at the heart of Glasgow's inner west end, and has sought over a number of years to broaden its outreach by making the cathedral a centre of artistic activity, concerts, art exhibitions and a variety of other events are hosted from time to time.

The musical tradition within worship is particularly strong, in keeping with the identity of the congregation as the cathedral church for the diocese. An adult voluntary mixed choir sings to a professional standard under the Director of Music, Friðrik (Frikki) Walker. In October 2007, the choir was augmented by the addition of a treble section.

The organ is a three manual William Hill instrument which was rebuilt in 1967 and completely restored in 1990.

The cathedral has a peal of ten bells. The tenor bell weighs 32 long cwt (3,600 lb or 1,600 kg).

=== Director of Music ===
- Friðrik Walker (1996–)

=== Cathedral organists ===
- William Green Martin
- George Pattman 1904–1917
- John Pullein 1917–?
- Gordon Cameron
- Albert Heeley
- Kenneth Mackintosh
- Derek Williams
- Timothy Redman
- James Laird
- Bernard J Porter
- Stuart Muir (Acting)
- Friðrik Walker 1996– (combined into Director of Music role)
- Steven McIntyre (2023–)

=== Assistant organists ===
- Friðrik Walker ARCO
- David Hamilton FRCO
- David Spottiswoode
- Iain Ogg
- Stuart Muir ARCO
- Stephen Jones
- John Gormley
- Oliver Rundell ARCO
- Christopher Hampson
- Peter Yardley-Jones
- Geoffrey Woollatt ARCO (2009–2012)
- Mark Browne FRCO (Acting)
- Peter Wakeford (2013–2015)
- Steven McIntyre FRCO (2014–2023)

=== Organ scholars ===
- Mark Browne (2004–2005)
- Christopher Hampson (2005–2006)
- Kirsty Traynor (2007–2008)
- Eilidh Harris (2023–)

== Restoration ==
From the mid-1980s to 2002 St Mary's Cathedral underwent an extensive restoration.

=== Phase 1 – Remedial works at the crossing ===
As a result of water ingress to the organ serious damage was discovered to the beams supporting the crossing. Repair work was put in hand, and a survey of the building condition carried out. Following the survey, an extensive fundraising project was commenced in early 1986.

=== Phase 2 – Chancel and organ ===
The chancel, tower and crossing were restored. The building re-roofed and the clerestory windows renovated. To carry out this work, the opportunity was taken to completely overhaul and rebuild the organ.

The topping out ceremony took place at the top of the spire on 19 December 1989. The dedication was carried out by Bishop Derek Rawcliffe with Provost Malcolm Grant, with the cathedral choir singing Ding Dong Merrily on High. In June 1990, the cathedral choir undertook a one-day tour of all seven mainland Scottish Anglican cathedrals as part of the fundraising effort to overhaul and rebuild the organ.

=== Phase 3 – Synod Hall ===
The roof of the Synod Hall was replaced, new lighting, provision of new toilets, the Sacristy Corridor was levelled, a choir room provided, the bishop's vestry was replaced by a disabled toilet with level access to the cathedral to the crossing and a wheelchair lift between the disabled toilet and the Synod Hall. The cramped kitchen was dispensed with and replaced with a catering area in the north end of the hall.

=== Phase 4 – The nave ===
The largest works to date that required the congregation to worship at the nearby Lansdowne Parish Church from October 2000 to March 2002. Work included the provision a new glazed porch, new tiled flooring to replace the temporary flooring from previous phase, completion of the Gywneth Leech decorations and a new lighting scheme.

== Prehistory ==
By tradition, the congregation was founded by Alexander Duncan in 1715. However, a list of principal members of the congregation from 1713 shows that its origins extend back to 1689 when the Episcopalian structure of the Church of Scotland was removed by Act of the Scottish Parliament, and the Scottish Episcopal Church as a separate entity emerged. In 1689, Episcopalianism was not widely supported in the West of Scotland, but there were families in Glasgow with Episcopalian and Jacobite sentiments, some with links to the church authorities prior to disestablishment. During the reign of William III they kept a low profile, becoming more assertive after the accession of Queen Anne in 1702.

The earliest contemporary report of the congregation, from Robert Wodrow, describes a service which took place in 1703 to mark the anniversary of the execution of Charles I. The service was held in the lodgings in Saltmarket of Sir John Bell, a former Provost of Glasgow, and resulted in a riot. At this period several clergy were involved, including two local men, John Fullarton (formerly incumbent at Paisley Abbey) and John Hay (formerly at New Monklands); Alexander Burgess (formerly at Temple near Rosslyn) also makes an appearance. The earliest reference to Alexander Duncan dates from 1710 when, with John Fullarton, he attends the deathbed of Lady Dundonald in the Place of Paisley.

Glasgow's Episcopal clergy had been operating outside the law (non-juror), but in 1712 a clergyman arrived prepared to take the oath to make him 'qualified'. William Cockburn set up a meeting-house (he calls it a chapel); the location is not recorded. In 1713 he also marked the death of Charles I. His sermon on that occasion survives, with a list of the congregation, which includes established Glasgow families such as the Bells, Barns, Crawfurds, Grahames, and Walkinshaws, and Alexander Duncan. Sir Donald MacDonald of Sleat played an important part, and his Highland retainers, Gaelic-speaking and in kilts, acted as guards. This chapel was attacked by a rabble a few days after Queen Anne's death and Cockburn fled, an event commemorated in an anonymous ballad, The Downfall of Cockburn's Meeting House, found amongst Wodrow's papers.

Members of the congregation played an active part in the Battle of Sheriffmuir in 1715, fighting for the Old Pretender, whilst the rest of Glasgow supported the Hanoverian side. Some of the Jacobites fled; some had their estates confiscated. John Walkinshaw escaped from Stirling Castle by changing clothes with his wife, and made for the Old Pretender in Avignon; later he acted as the Prince's envoy in discussions for his marriage to Princess Clementina Sobieska. The congregation survived, depleted and impoverished, and subject to increasingly restrictive laws. In 1728 a meeting house was opened in Broad Close opposite the university, with Duncan (a college bishop since 1724) assisted by a Mr Wingate. This was soon closed by the magistrates and Wingate sent packing. Duncan, now an old man, held services in his own home until his death in 1733.

Evidence is sketchy as to the nature of the Christian observance by the Episcopal congregation in Glasgow in the first half of the eighteenth century, and mostly comes from Wodrow. He mentions a Bible and prayer-book, presumably the Book of Common Prayer, and also a canonical gown. Cockburn uses the term Liturgy. Sermons were preached. There is Holy Communion at Christmas (which Wodrow calls Yule) and Easter with, in 1713, an altar being set up in anticipation (perhaps an indication that Communion was infrequent). (Wodrow's own preference was to attend a sermon against holy days). Of the other Sacraments, Baptisms and Marriages by 'unqualified' Episcopal ministers had been outlawed in 1695, although Baptisms certainly took place. Wodrow noted wrily that the congregation only started to mark the fast for the martyrdom of Charles I after disestablishment. Episcopal ministers attended the sick and the dying, and took funerals. The Litany, used by Episcopalians elsewhere is Scotland at this period, was probably used in Glasgow. The congregation collected money for the poor. Some English practices (e.g. their way of distributing Communion) were replacing the Scottish traditions, and this caused complaints.

Seven years passed before the arrival of the next incumbent, George Graham from Perthshire, who had a meeting house in Candleriggs. The Jacobite rising of 1745 had brought Bonnie Prince Charlie to Glasgow. Clementina Walkinshaw, daughter of John Walkinshaw, would later become his mistress, and mother of his only child. The penal laws restricting Scottish Episcopalians now became draconian. Graham left the following year. His replacement, in 1750, was David Lyon, with a meeting-house in Stockwell Street. From 1751, Episcopalians prepared to acknowledge the Hanoverian king could attend the qualified chapel, St Andrew's-by-the-Green. David Lyon, by now the only Scottish Episcopal priest ministering to a flock scattered across the West of Scotland, took part in the secret meeting held in Moffat in 1769 to discuss a Protestant bride for Bonnie Prince Charlie.

David Lyon was followed by Andrew Wood, then Andrew Macdonald. Macdonald wrote novels, poetry, and plays, and is the only member of this lineage to appear in the Dictionary of National Biography. He eventually left Glasgow for London where he died young. A book of Twenty-eight Miscellaneous Sermons by Andrew Macdonald was published posthumously in 1790. The next incumbent from 1788 was Alexander Jamieson from Marykirk, Kincardineshire. The penal laws were repealed in 1792. The congregation grew, for many years meeting in a class room in the Grammar School. In 1825 they moved to St Mary's Chapel in Renfield Street, moving to the present building in 1871. The incumbents of the Renfield Street chapel were George Almond (1825–1848), Bishop Walter Trower (1848–1853) and Richard Oldham. (A summary of – Roger Edwards: Glasgow's Episcopalians – Rebel Romantics (2008)).

See Old Saint Paul's, Edinburgh for the rather different experience of Edinburgh's Episcopalians.
