= Arthur Wheatley =

Arthur Wheatley may refer to:

- Arthur Wheatley (provost) (1931–2003), Scottish Episcopalian clergyman
- Arthur Wheatley (rugby union) (1908–1993), English international rugby union player
