= Alexander MacKenzie (priest) =

British priest

- Provost of St Andrew's Cathedral, Inverness
- Church: Scottish Episcopal Church
- Installed: 1918
- Term ended: 1949

Orders
- Ordination: 1905

Personal details
- Born: Alexander Augustin Donald MacKenzie; 19 February 1876
- Died: 1 July 1969 (aged 93)
- Education: Hatfield College, Durham

Alexander Augustin Donald MacKenzie (19 February 1876 – 1 July 1969) was Provost of St Andrew's Cathedral, Inverness from 1918 to 1949.

Mackenzie studied theology at Durham University on a scholarship, and was a member of Hatfield College there. As a student he was active in Durham University Boat Club, serving as both Secretary and President by 1903. He also became Senior Man of Hatfield and President of the Durham Union for the Epiphany term of 1903. Mackenzie was ordained in 1905.

He began his ecclesiastical career with a curacy at St Mark's Church, Leicester. He was the Precentor of Inverness Cathedral from 1911 to 1918 when he became provost.

He died aged 92 in 1969.

== Notes ==
Religious titles
Preceded by Reginald John Simpson Mitchell-Innes	Provost of St Andrew's Cathedral, Inverness; 1918–1949	Succeeded by James Henry Leslie Pennell
