= Reginald Mitchell-Innes =

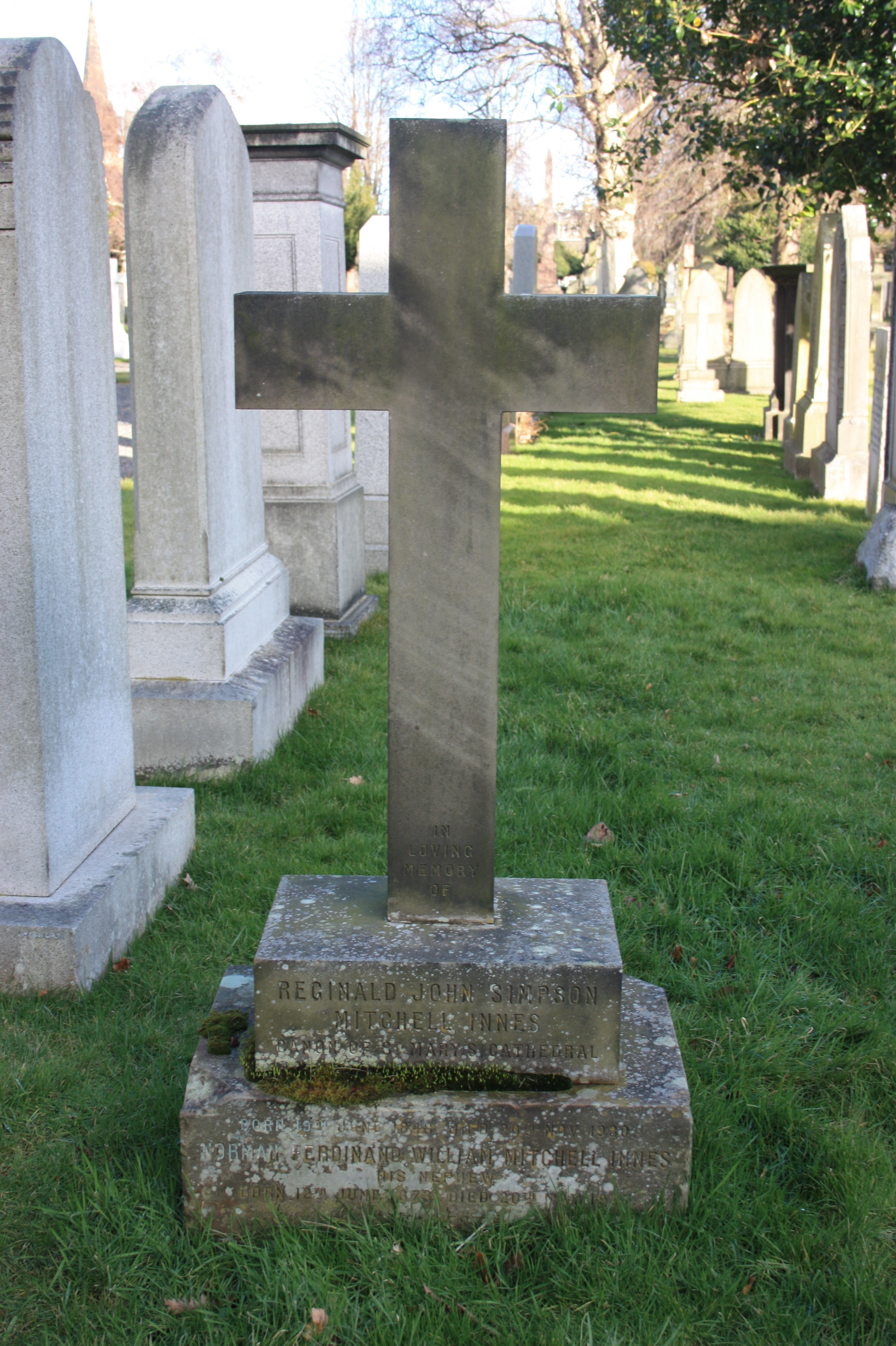
The grave of Mitchell-Innes, Dean Cemetery, Edinburgh

Reginald John Simpson Mitchell-Innes (1848–1930) was an Episcopalian priest in the late 19th and early 20th centuries.

== Life ==
He was born in Berwickshire on 19 June 1848 and educated at Trinity College, Glenalmond.

He then studied divinity at Christ Church, Oxford. Ordained in 1876 he began his ecclesiastical career with a curacy at Edinburgh Cathedral after which he was Rector of Old St Paul's, Edinburgh and then Christ Church, Glasgow before becoming Provost of Inverness Cathedral in 1911, a post he was to hold for 7 years.

He died in Edinburgh after a period of ill-health on 20 November 1930.

== Notes ==
Religious titles
Preceded by Vernon Staley	Provost of St Andrew's Cathedral, Inverness; 1911 – 1918	Succeeded by Alexander Augustin Donald MacKenzie
