= Kelvin Holdsworth =

British priest

The Very Reverend Kelvin Holdsworth
- Provost of St Mary's Cathedral, Glasgow
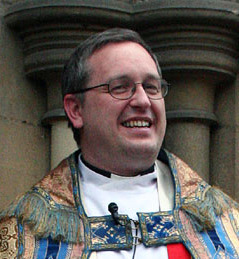
- Holdsworth after his institution on 31 May 2006 outside St Mary's Cathedral. (Photographer – Stewart D. Macfarlane)
- Church: Scottish Episcopal Church
- Diocese: Diocese of Glasgow and Galloway
- In office: 31 May 2006 to present

Orders
- Ordination: 4 July 1997 (deacon); 9 June 1998 (priest)

Personal details
- Born: 22 October 1966 (age 59) Leeds, Yorkshire, England
- Denomination: Anglicanism
- Education: Manchester Polytechnic; University of St Andrews; University of Edinburgh

Kelvin Holdsworth (born 21 October 1966) is a British priest of the Scottish Episcopal Church. Since 2006, he has served as Rector and Provost of St Mary's Cathedral, Glasgow.

== Early life and education ==
Holdsworth was born on 22 October 1966 in Leeds, Yorkshire, England. He was educated at Bearsden Academy in Bearsden, Glasgow, Scotland, and Ossett School in Ossett, Yorkshire, England. He studied computing science and mathematics at Manchester Polytechnic, and graduated with a Bachelor of Science (BSc) degree in 1989. He then studied practical theology and Christian ethics at the University of St Andrews, graduating with a Bachelor of Divinity (BD) in 1992.

From 1992 to 1995, Holdsworth was a layman working with St Benet's Chaplaincy, the inter-denominational Christian chaplaincy of Queen Mary and Westfield College, University of London. In 1995, he entered the Theological Institute of the Scottish Episcopal Church to train for ordination. During this time, he also studied at New College, Edinburgh, and graduated from the University of Edinburgh with a Master of Theology (MTh) degree in 1996.

== Ordained ministry ==
Holdsworth was ordained in the Scottish Episcopal Church as a deacon on 4 July 1997 in St Ninian's Cathedral, Perth. He was ordained as a priest on 9 June 1998. From 1997 to 2000, he served his curacy as the precentor of St Ninian's Cathedral.

From 2000 to 2006, Holdsworth was Rector of St Saviour's Church, Bridge of Allan, Stirling, in the Diocese of St Andrews, Dunkeld and Dunblane. During this time, he was also the Episcopal chaplain to the University of Stirling.

His appointment to St Mary's Cathedral, Glasgow was announced simultaneously there and at St Saviour's Church on Bridge of Allan on 5 February 2006. He was instituted at St Mary's Cathedral on 31 May 2006, the Feast of the Visitation.

In November 2024, Holdsworth officiated at the funeral of Janey Godley.

== Controversy ==
=== Quran readings of Epiphany 2017 ===
The BBC reported that during the Epiphany service in January 2017, the Quran was read from the lectern, including "the Islamic teaching that Jesus is not the son of God and should not be worshipped." Holdsworth declined to comment on whether he knew in advance of the reading. David Chillingworth, primus of the Scottish Episcopal Church, commented, "The decisions which have led to the situation in St Mary's Cathedral are a matter for the provost and the cathedral community," according also to the BBC. The provost of the cathedral is Holdsworth.

=== Comments about Prince George ===
In December 2017, Holdsworth became a figure of international attention in a controversy over comments he made about Prince George. Holdsworth stated of the then four-year-old child that Anglicans should pray that he, "be blessed one day with the love of a fine young gentleman", to force the Anglican Communion to institutionalize same-sex marriage. According to TIME magazine, Holdsworth's comments about the child's sexuality "sparked outrage." Holdsworth was strongly criticised by Gavin Ashenden, former Honorary Chaplain to the Queen, who stated the comment was "unkind" and "profoundly un-Christian" and added this was the "theological equivalent of the curse of the wicked fairy in one of the fairytales".

Holdsworth replied that the controversial blog post in question was two years old, and "was entirely about the church and its policies around LGBT inclusion" and not about the royal family. However, he did offer an apology, stating:

The ironic comment that I made quite a while ago could be seen as hurtful to members of the Royal Family, a group of people whom I actually rather admire.

I'm sorry that something that I wrote has been interpreted in the way that it has. It was not my intention to cause hurt and I regret that this has led to the current focus on Prince George.

The issues about the church and its capacity to welcome same-sex couples who want to be married remain important. However, I won’t be part of a media circus that puts further pressure on members of the Royal Family. They need peace and young members of the Royal Family need privacy too.

== Political career ==
Holdsworth stood for the Bridge of Allan ward of Stirling Council in May 2003.

Holdsworth stood for the Parliament of the United Kingdom in the constituency of Stirling at the 2005 General Election as the Liberal Democrat candidate. He came third behind the Labour and Conservative Party candidates.

== Personal life ==
Holdsworth is openly gay. He was listed at number 35 of the most influential LGBT people in the UK in 2015.

Anglican Communion titles
Preceded by Griff Dines	Rector and provost of St Mary's Cathedral, Glasgow; May 2006 – present	Incumbent
