= Hugh McIntosh (provost) =

Hugh McIntosh was Provost of St Mary's Cathedral, Glasgow from 1966 until 1970.

He was born on 5 June 1914 and educated at the University of Durham. He was ordained in 1942 and began his career as the Precentor at St Paul's Cathedral, Dundee. After this he was Senior Chaplain at St Mary's Cathedral, Edinburgh. He held incumbencies in Gullane and Dumfries before his appointment as the synod clerk for the Diocese of Glasgow and Galloway in 1959.

He died on 31 March 2002.

Religious titles
| Preceded by Frank Fairbairn Laming | Rectors and provosts of St. Mary's Cathedral, Glasgow; 1966 to 1970 | Succeeded by Harold Chad Mansbridge |
