= Inverness Cathedral =

St Andrew's Cathedral
- The Cathedral Church of Saint Andrew
- Cathair-Eaglais Inbhir Nis
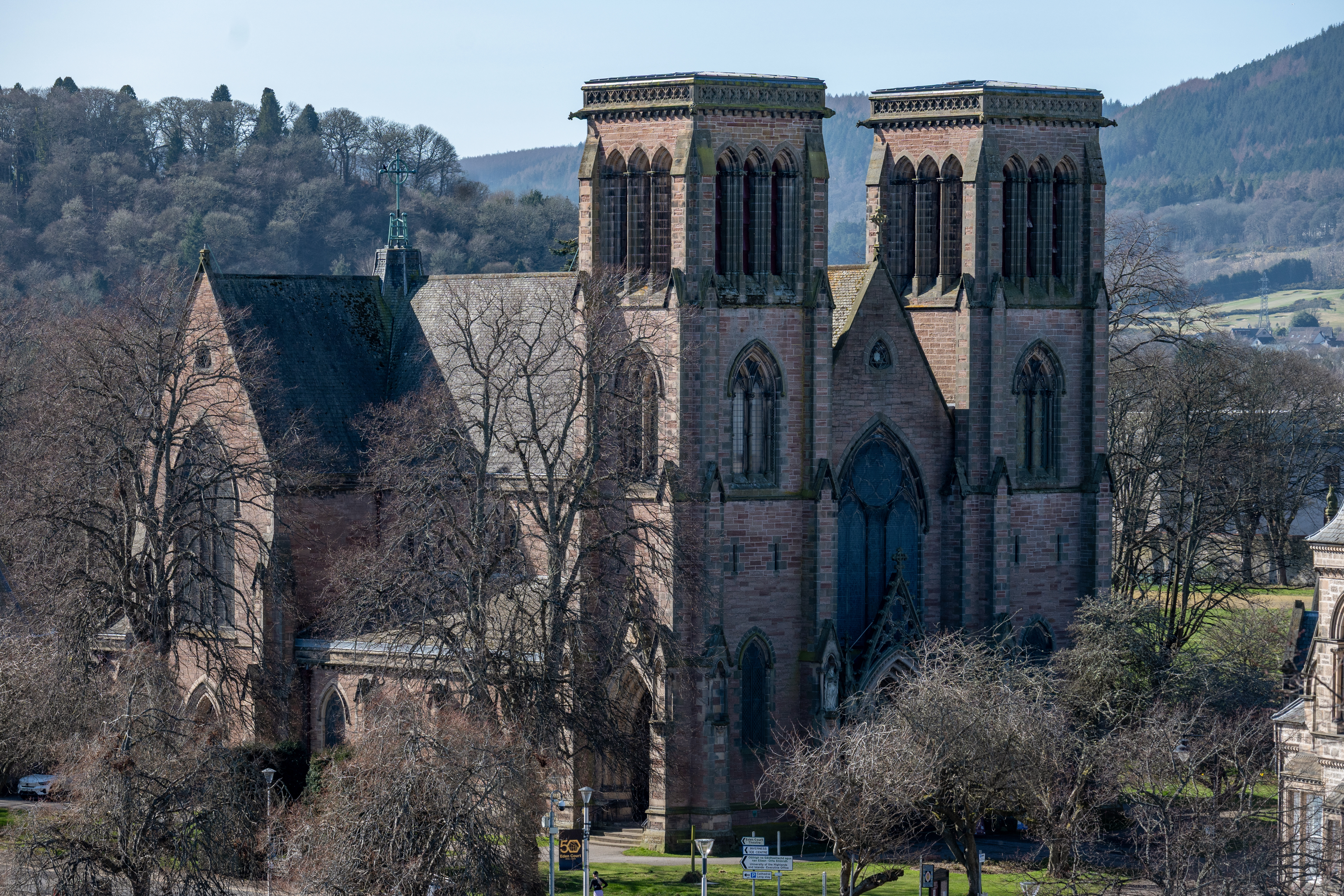
- St Andrew's Cathedral from Inverness Castle

- Location within Highland
- 57°28′28″N 4°13′45″W
- Location: Inverness
- Country: Scotland
- Denomination: Scottish Episcopal Church
- Churchmanship: High Church
- Website: www.invernesscathedral.org

History
- Founder: Bishop Robert Eden
- Dedication: St Andrew

Architecture
- Architectural type: Church
- Style: Gothic Revival
- Years built: 1866-1869

Administration
- Diocese: Moray, Ross & Caithness

Clergy
- Bishop: Mark Strange

Inverness Cathedral (Scottish Gaelic: Cathair-Eaglais Inbhir Nis), also known as the Cathedral Church of Saint Andrew (1866–69), is a cathedral of the Scottish Episcopal Church situated in the city of Inverness in Scotland close to the banks of the River Ness. It is the seat of the Bishop of Moray, Ross and Caithness, ordinary of the Diocese of Moray, Ross and Caithness. The cathedral is the northernmost extant diocesan cathedral in mainland Britain - Dornoch Cathedral, Fortrose Cathedral and Elgin Cathedral are no longer acting as diocesan cathedrals. It was the first new Protestant cathedral to be completed in Great Britain since the Reformation.

== History ==
Bishop Robert Eden decided that the cathedral for the united Diocese of Moray, Ross and Caithness should be in Inverness. The foundation stone was laid by the Archbishop of Canterbury, Charles Longley, in 1866 and construction was complete by 1869, although a lack of funds precluded the building of the two giant spires of the original design. The architect was Alexander Ross, who was based in the city. The cathedral is built of red Tarradale stone, with the nave columns of Peterhead granite.

The cathedral congregation began as a mission in 1853, on the opposite side (east) of the River Ness.

== Bells ==
The cathedral contains a ring of ten bells, which are noted as being the most northerly peal of change-ringing bells in a church in the world. The tenor bell weighs 17 cwt.

== Stained glass ==
The stained glass windows of the cathedral were designed and installed by Hardman & Co. The great Western window depicts "Christ in Majesty at the Last Judgement" and was installed in memory of Bishop Eden.

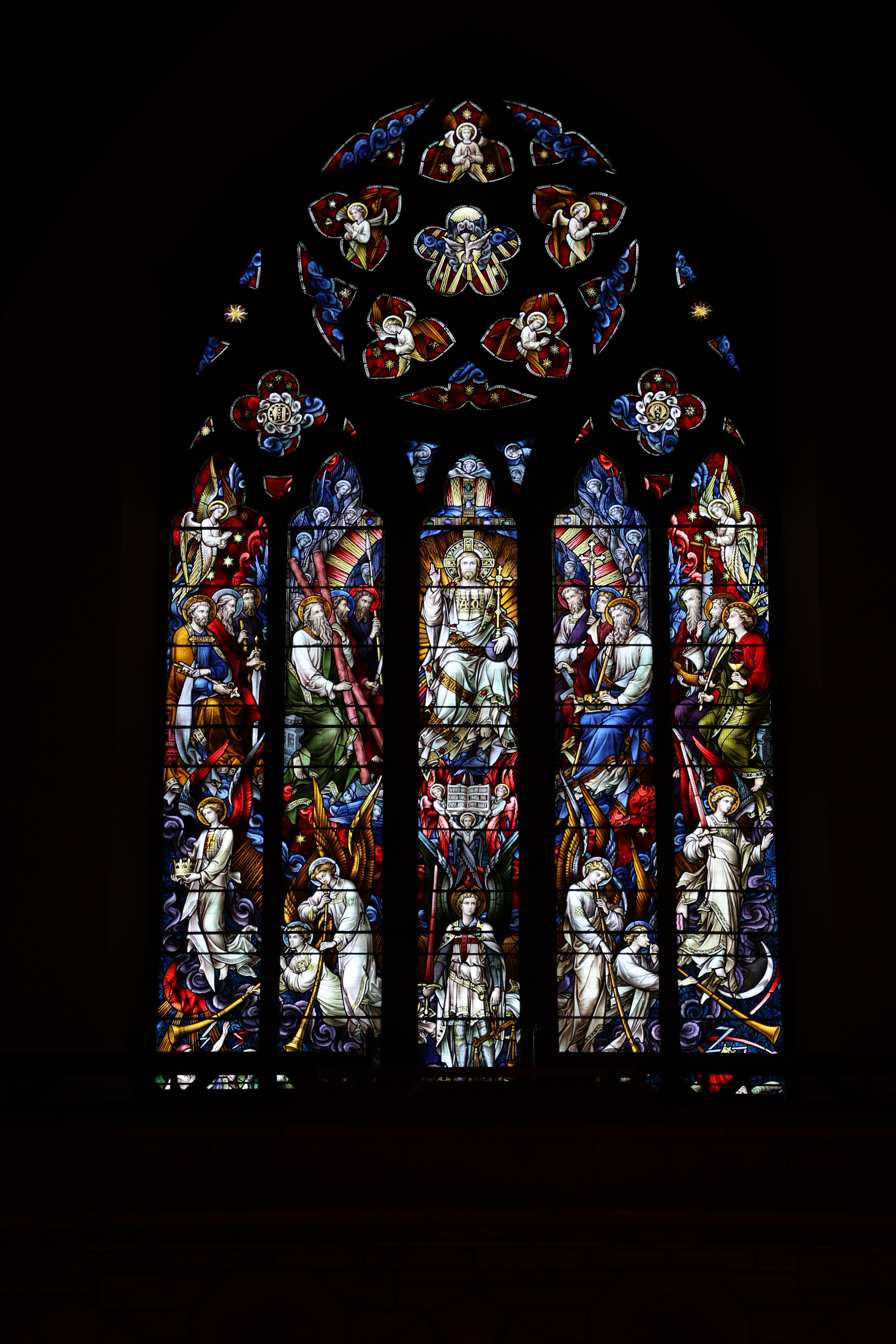
Great West Window, Inverness Cathedral

== List of Provosts ==
The following have served as Provost of Inverness Cathedral:

- Robert Eden
- James Kelly
- Herbert Mather (1891 to 1897)
- Allan Webb (1898 to 1901)
- Vernon Staley
- Reginald Mitchell-Innes (1911 to 1918)
- Alexander MacKenzie (1918 to 1949)
- Leslie Pennell (1949 to 1965)
- Frank Laming (1966 to 1974)
- Jack Woods (1975 to 1980)
- Arthur Wheatley (1980 to 1983)
- Gordon Reid (1984 to 1988)
- Alan Horsley (1988 to 1991)
- Malcolm Grant (1991 to 2002)
- Michael Hickford (2003 to 2004)
- Alex Gordon (2005 to 2014)
- Sarah Murray (2017 to present)

== Organists ==
- E A Bishop (1869 to 1872)
- John Henry Gibbons-Money (1872 to 1900)
- Thomas Taylor (1900 to 1916)
- Hugh Armstrong (1916 to 1917)
- Alfred H Allen (1917 to 1919)
- Daniel Edwin Roberts (1920 to 1966)
- Ena Margaret Barrett (1966 to 1975)
- David Hardie (1975 to 1978)
- Peter David Godden (1979 to 1985)
- Russell Tolmie Grant (1985 to 2001)

== Assistant Organist/ Cathedral Organist ==
- Gordon Tocher (Assistant Organist 1985 - 2005; Cathedral Organist 2005 to present)

== Directors of Music & Organist ==
- Charles Edward Barbieri (2003 - 2006)
- Bert Richardson (2007 to 2022)
- Adrian Marple (2022 to present)

== Gallery ==
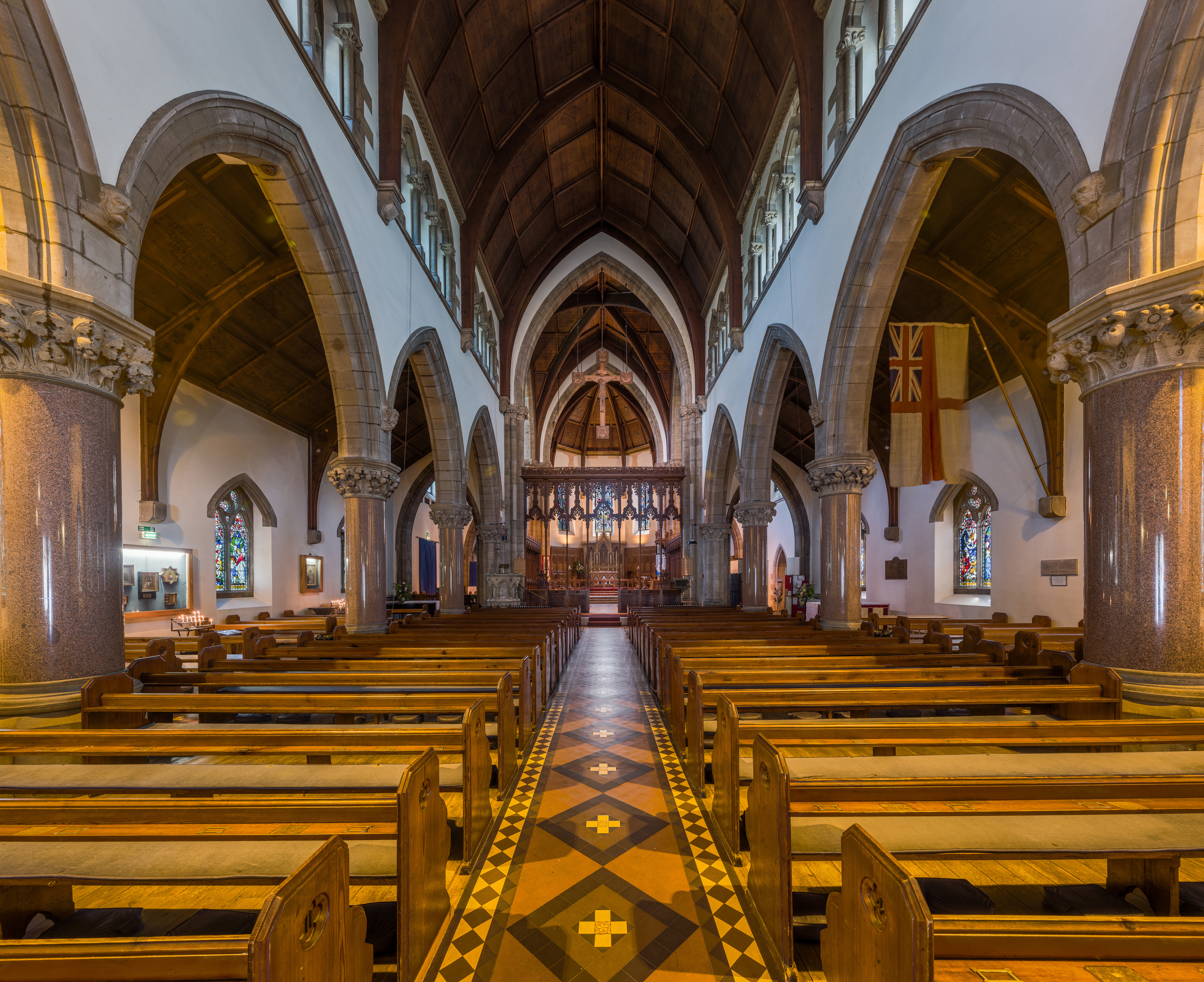
The nave looking south towards the choir

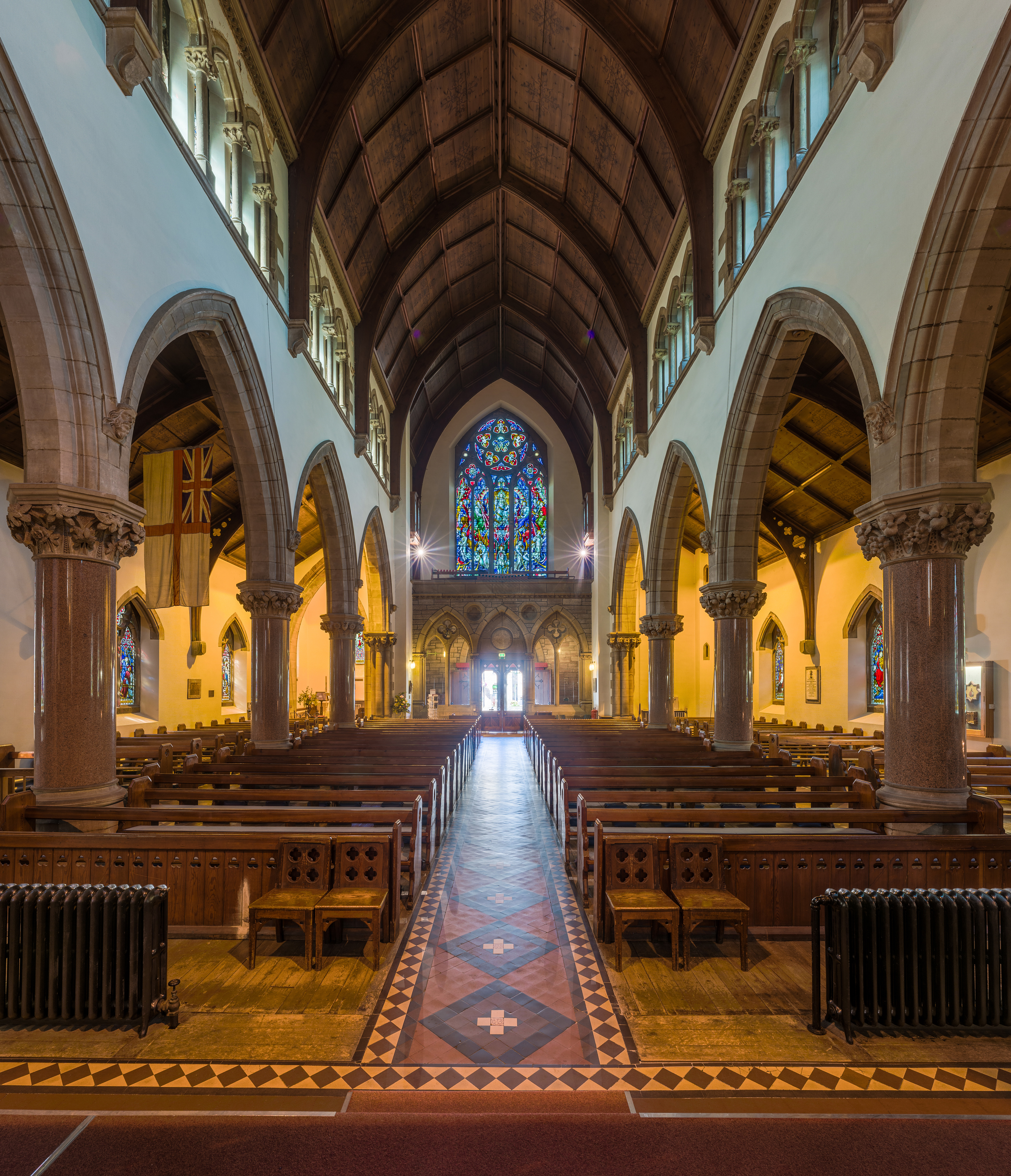
The nave looking north towards the entrance

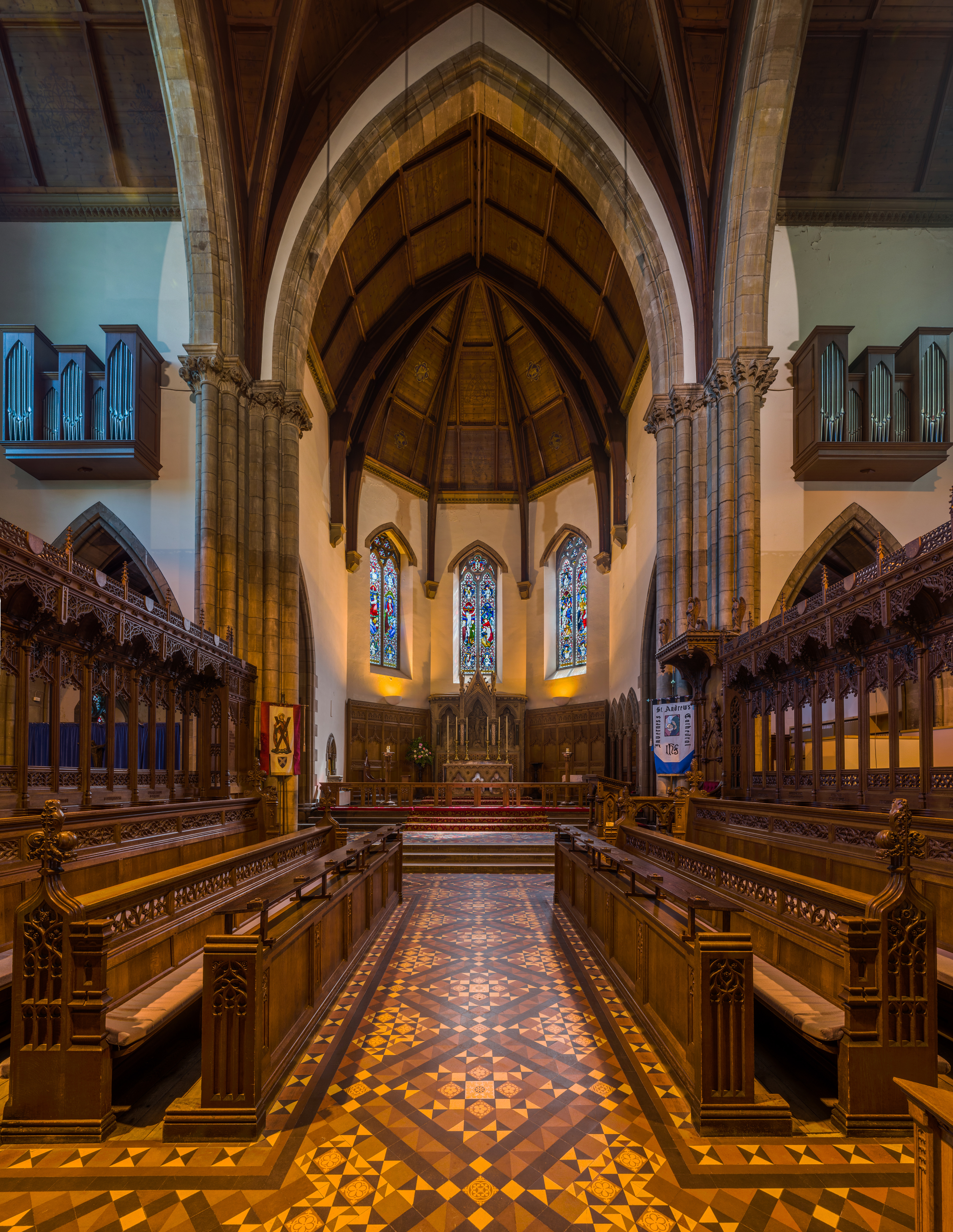
The choir and altar

== See also ==
- St Michael & All Angels, Inverness
