= John Murray (provost of St Mary's Cathedral, Glasgow) =

John Gabriel Murray (1901–1973) was an Anglican priest in the mid 20th century.

He was born in 1901 and educated at Trinity College, Cambridge. He was ordained after a period of study at Bishops' College, Cheshunt in 1925. His first posts were curacies at St Mark's Regent's Park and St Gabriel, Pimlico after which he was Perpetual Curate at All Saints, Hampton. He was then Vicar of St Francis, Isleworth before becoming Provost of St Mary's Cathedral, Glasgow. In 1944 he became Vicar of St Mary's, Hendon and then in 1952 of St Mary the Virgin, Eynesbury. From 1959 to 1970 he was at All Saint's Glencarse. He retired to Pittenweem and died in 1973.

Religious titles
Preceded by Kenneth Warner	Provost and rector of St Mary's Cathedral, Glasgow; 1937–1944	Succeeded by Martin Leonard
