= Ambrose Lethbridge =

Ambrose Lethbridge (20 January 1875 – 13 March 1962) was a British Anglican priest who served as Provost of St Mary's Cathedral, Glasgow from 1917 until 1926.

Lethbridge was born in Punjab, British India, and attended Keble College, Oxford. He died in Peterborough, Northamptonshire, aged 87.

Religious titles
| Preceded by Frederic Llewellyn Deane | Rectors and provosts of St. Mary's Cathedral, Glasgow; 1917 to 1926 | Succeeded by Algernon Giles Seymour |
