= Harold Mansbridge =

Harold Chad Mansbridge was provost of St Mary's Cathedral, Glasgow from 1970 until his death on 15 July 1980.

He was born on 4 March 1917 and educated at Price's School, Fareham and Kelham Theological College. He was ordained in 1942 and began his career with curacies in Nottingham, Cullercoats and Stratfield Mortimer. He was rector of Shellingford from 1948 to 1960; and of Bieldside until 1970.

Religious titles
Preceded by Hugh McIntosh	Rectors and provosts of St. Mary's Cathedral, Glasgow; 1970 to 1980	Succeeded by Malcolm Etheridge Grant
