= Leslie Pennell =

James Henry Leslie Pennell (1906–1996) was Provost of St Andrew's Cathedral, Inverness from 1949 to 1965.

He was educated at the University of Edinburgh and ordained in 1930 after a period of study at Edinburgh Theological College. He began his ecclesiastical career as Precentor at Inverness Cathedral. After this he was Rector of Dunblane until he became Provost.

== Notes ==
Religious titles
Preceded by Alexander Augustin Donald MacKenzie	Provost of St Andrew's Cathedral, Inverness; 1949– 1965	Succeeded by Frank Fairbairn Laming
