= Alex Gordon (priest) =

British Provost

Alexander Ronald Gordon was Provost of St Andrew's Cathedral, Inverness.

Gordon was born in 1949, educated at the University of Nottingham and the College of the Resurrection, Mirfield. After curacies in Headingley and Fareham he held incumbencies in Cudworth, Lairg, Brora and Dornoch. He was the Anglican Chaplain at Strasbourg from 2002 until his appointment as Provost.

== Notes ==
Religious titles
Preceded by Michael Hickford	Provost of St Andrew's Cathedral, Inverness; 2005 - 2014	Succeeded by Sarah Murray
