= Griff Dines =

(Philip Joseph) Griff Dines (born 1959) is a Scottish Episcopalian priest, a former Provost of St Mary's Cathedral, Glasgow

He was born on 22 June 1959 and educated at the Royal Grammar School, Newcastle, University College London and Clare College, Cambridge. He was ordained in 1987 after a period of study at Westcott House, Cambridge. After curacies in Northolt and Withington he was Vicar of St Martin, Wythenshawe from 1991 until his cathedral appointment. In 2005 he became Business Manager of the Macdonald Associates Consultancy, where he worked with David Dadswell, who is now Diocesan Secretary of the Diocese of Lincoln. Following his role as Business Manager he became a teacher of mathematics and statistics at Lincoln University Technical College in 2016. Dines was then appointed Head of the Bishop's Office by the Bishop of Lincoln, the Right Reverend Christopher Lowson, in February 2019. He is married to his second wife, the Reverend Canon Sally-Anne McDougall who, until May 2020, was Precentor of Lincoln Cathedral and who was, until 2017, Chaplain to Christopher Lowson as Bishop of Lincoln.

Dines left his post at the Bishop of Lincoln's office in December 2019 and moved to Spain to resume his teaching career, where he worked as the mathematics department boss at Laude Newton College. He retired in June 2025, but continues to live in Spain.

Religious titles
Preceded by Peter Brereton Francis	Rector and provost of St. Mary's Cathedral, Glasgow; 1998 to 2005	Succeeded by Kelvin Holdsworth
