= St Andrew's-by-the-Green =

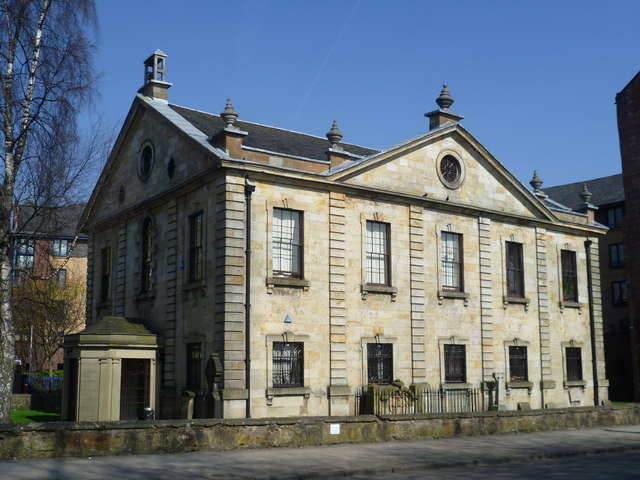
- Interactive map of the St Andrew's-by-the-Green area
- Former names: St Andrew's Episcopal Church

General information
- Type: Church
- Architectural style: Georgian
- Location: 33 Turnbull Street; Merchant City, G1 5PR Glasgow
- Coordinates: 55°51′14.81″N 4°14′39.44″W
- Current tenants: Glasgow Association for Mental Health
- Construction started: 1750
- Completed: 1751/2
- Renovated: 1988
- Cost: £1,250 12s 9½d
- Renovation cost: £600,000
- Owner: Christian Action (Glasgow) Housing Trust

Design and construction
- Architect: Andrew Hunter

Renovating team
- Renovating firm: Miller Partnership

St Andrew's-by-the-Green is an 18th-century category-A-listed former church in Glasgow, Scotland. A Qualified Chapel, it was the first Episcopalian church built in the city. It is situated on the corner of Turnbull Street and Greendyke Street, overlooking Glasgow Green, on the edge of the city's East End.

== History ==
Construction on the church began in 1750, and ended in 1751 or 1752, according to different sources. It is the oldest Episcopalian Church building erected in Scotland since the Reformation, and one of the oldest church buildings in Glasgow. The nearby St Andrew's in the Square was started in 1739 and completed in 1757, making St Andrew's by the Green the fourth-oldest church building in Glasgow by date of starting construction, or third-oldest by date of completion, the earlier two being Glasgow Cathedral and the Trongate steeple. It is a symmetrical classical building. The design was produced by Andrew Hunter, himself a Presbyterian, and construction undertaken by masons Andrew Hunter and William Paul, and wright Thomas Thomson. Hunter was called before his Kirk Session and excommunicated from the Church of Scotland for producing the work. The entire cost of the building was £1,250 12s 9½d, comprising £90 5s 0d for purchase of the site, £420 6s 5d for stonework and £740 1s 4½d on the interior. Because of the church's situation by a low-lying part of Glasgow Green, it was frequently flooded before the parkland was levelled to protect it from the river.

There was an historic split between the Hanoverian-supporting Church of Scotland and the Jacobite-supporting Scottish Episcopal Church, who believed Charles Edward Stuart to be the true monarch. Following the failed Jacobite rising of 1745, many Episcopalian congregations resigned themselves to a Hanoverian monarchy and agreed to use the English Prayer Book and pray for the Hanoverians, becoming Qualified Chapels; St Andrew's Episcopal Church was one of these. Following the death of Charles Edward Stuart in 1788, almost all of the qualified chapels merged into the Scottish Episcopal Church; the St Andrew's congregation joined the Episcopal Church in 1805. However, one congregation in Glasgow, led by the Reverend Alexander Jamieson, continued independently until Jamieson's death in 1825. Jamieson is buried at St Andrew's-by-the-Green, his grave marked with a Celtic cross. His congregation subsequently built a chapel on Renfield Street, named St Mary's, in 1826. The building was inspired by St George's Chapel, Windsor Castle, but was demolished in the late nineteenth century, when the congregation built St Mary's Cathedral on Great Western Road. The building opened in 1871 as St Mary's Church and was raised to cathedral status in 1908.

The depopulation of the centre of Glasgow in mid-twentieth century reduced the congregation to the point that the church was no longer viable, the last service held in the building in April 1975. By 1978, the Church had become a target for vandals, and the pulpit and other valuable items were moved to safety within the People's Palace on Glasgow Green.

=== Organ ===
St Andrew's was the first church in Glasgow to install an organ for public worship, resulting in the nickname, "Whistlin' Kirk" or the "Kist o' Whistles". It was purchased from the Qualified Chapel in Edinburgh's Carrubber's Close when that congregation moved to another building. The organ had been built by John Snetzler in 1747, and was moved into St Andrew's-by-the-Green in 1775, although it is thought not to have been used for worship until 1777. It was enlarged by a pupil of Snetzler's, John Donaldson of York, in 1788, and replaced entirely in 1812. The old organ was sold to the Glasgow Unitarians' new chapel in Union Street in 1813, and moved with them to their new home on St Vincent Street in 1856. This church was subsequently demolished in 1982, and the organ, by now the oldest in the city, was gifted to the University of Glasgow, in whose Concert Hall it now stands.

== Renovation ==
The church was acquired in 1985 by the Christian Action (Glasgow) Housing Trust as office accommodation for its parent organisation, West of Scotland Housing Association. A major fundraising effort, aided by the late John Crichton-Stuart, 6th Marquess of Bute, raised the £600,000 required to renovate the building. In June 2003, it became the headquarters of the Glasgow Association for Mental Health.

== See also ==
- St Andrew's in the Square
- St Mary's Cathedral, Glasgow
- James Frederick Skinner Gordon, minister 1844–90
