= Malcolm Grant (priest) =

Malcolm Etheridge Grant
- Born: 6 August 1944; Maidstone, Kent, England
- Education: Dunfermline High School; University of Edinburgh; Edinburgh Theological College
- Spouse: Katrina Grant
- Children: Alison Grant, Iain Grant
- Religion: Christianity
- Church: Scottish Episcopal Church, Church of England
- Congregations served: St Ninian, Invergordon; St Wulfram's Church, Grantham; St. Mary's Cathedral, Glasgow; St Andrew's Cathedral, Inverness; St Mary the Virgin, Eaton Bray with Edlesborough
- Offices held: Provost of St. Mary's Cathedral, Glasgow; Provost of St Andrew's Cathedral, Inverness; Rural Dean of Dunstable

Malcolm Etheridge Grant (born 6 August 1944) is an Anglican priest.

He was born on 6 August 1944, educated at Dunfermline High School, the University of Edinburgh and Edinburgh Theological College and ordained in 1970. His first post was as Assistant Priest at St. Mary's Cathedral, Glasgow after which he was Vicar of Grantham. From 1981 to 1991 he was Provost of St. Mary's Cathedral, Glasgow;and from then until 2002 of St Andrew's Cathedral, Inverness. In that year he became Vicar of Eaton Bray with Edlesborough and in 2004 Rural Dean of Dunstable, retiring from both posts in 2009.

== Notes ==
Religious titles
Preceded by Harold Chad Mansbridge	Provost of St. Mary's Cathedral, Glasgow; 1981 to 1991	Succeeded by Peter Brereton Francis
Preceded by Alan Avery Allen Horsley	Provost of St Andrew's Cathedral, Inverness; 1991 to 2002	Succeeded by Michael Francis Hickford
