= Alan Horsley =

British priest

Alan Avery Allen Horsley is a retired Anglican priest and author in the 20th century.

He was born on 13 May 1936, educated at St Chad's College, Durham and Queen's College, Edgbaston and ordained in 1961. His first posts were curacies in Daventry, Reading and Wokingham. He then held incumbencies at Yeadon, Heyford and Stowe, Oakham and Lanteglos-by-Fowey. He was Provost of St Andrew's Cathedral, Inverness from 1988 to 1991 and finally Rural Dean of Rickmansworth until his retirement in 2001.

== Notes ==
Religious titles
Preceded by William Gordon Reid	Provost of St Andrew's Cathedral, Inverness; 1988 to 1991	Succeeded by Malcolm Etheridge Grant
