= Peter Francis (priest) =

Peter Brereton Francis
- Born: 18 June 1953 (age 73)
- Education: Malvern College; University of St Andrews
- Ordained: 1979
- Congregations served: Hagley (curate); Holy Trinity, Ayr (Rector); St. Mary's Cathedral, Glasgow (Rector & Provost)
- Offices held: Queen Mary College, London (Chaplain); Gladstone's Library, Hawarden (Warden & Librarian)

Peter Brereton Francis is the warden and chief librarian of Gladstone's Library, Hawarden. He took up the post in early 1997.

Peter was born on 18 June 1953 and educated at Malvern College and the University of St Andrews. He was ordained in 1979.

Peter was firstly a curate at Hagley then chaplain of Queen Mary College, London. He moved to Scotland as the rector of Holy Trinity, Ayr. On 2 May 1992 he was installed as the rector and provost of the Cathedral Church of St Mary the Virgin, Glasgow, a position he held until leaving in 1996.

Religious titles
Preceded by Malcolm Etheridge Grant	Rector and provost of St. Mary's Cathedral, Glasgow; May 1992 – 1996	Succeeded by Philip (Griff) Dines
