= Frank Laming =

Frank Fairbairn Laming (24 August 1908 – 3 June 1989) was an Anglican priest in the 20th century.

He was born on 24 August 1908 and educated at Edinburgh Theological College, where he studied for a Durham University course in theology, and was ordained in 1937. His first post was as Assistant Priest at Christ Church, Glasgow. He was then Priest in Charge of St Margaret, Renfrew and after that Rector of Holy Trinity Church, Motherwell. From 1953 to 1966 he was Provost of St. Mary's Cathedral, Glasgow; and from then until 1974 of St Andrew's Cathedral, Inverness. He died on 3 June 1989.

== Notes ==
Religious titles
Preceded by Martin Patrick Grainge Leonard	Provost of St. Mary's Cathedral, Glasgow; 1953 to 1966	Succeeded by Hugh McIntosh
Preceded by James Henry Leslie Pennell	Provost of St Andrew's Cathedral, Inverness; 1966 to 1974	Succeeded by John Mahwhinney Woods
