= Martin Leonard =

Martin Patrick Grainge Leonard DSO was an Anglican suffragan bishop from 1953 until his death.

Leonard was born at Torpenhow, near Cockermouth, Cumberland, on 5 July 1889. He was educated at Rossall, Fleetwood, Lancashire and Oriel College, Oxford before embarking on an ecclesiastical career including service as a World War I chaplain. Afterward, Leonard occupied a similar post at Cheltenham College. He spent 14 years with the Toc H organisation. Leonard subsequently became Rector of Hatfield, Rural Dean of Hertford, and Provost of St Mary's Cathedral, Glasgow. He was a Bishop of Thetford, and a lifelong supporter of the Boy Scout movement.

He died on 21 July 1963.

== Works ==
"A book of Prayers and Hymns Selected for Scouts"; London; C. A. Pearson; 1933.

Religious titles
Preceded by John Murray	Rectors and provosts of St. Mary's Cathedral, Glasgow; 1944 to 1953	Succeeded by Frank Fairbairn Laming
Preceded by John Walker Woodhouse	Bishop of Thetford; 1953 to 1963	Succeeded by Eric William Bradley Cordingly
