= Algernon Seymour (priest) =

Anglican priest (1886–1933)

Algernon Giles Seymour (1 September 1886 – 22 October 1933) was an Anglican priest in the first part of the 20th century.

Seymour was born into an aristocratic and ecclesiastical family. His father was Albert Seymour, sometime Archdeacon of Barnstaple (and himself the son of a priest) and his maternal grandfather was John Fortescue (himself a priest and son of Hugh Fortescue, 1st Earl Fortescue). He was a chorister in the Choir of King's College, Cambridge, and afterwards attended Aldenham School, Jesus College, Cambridge and Ripon College Cuddesdon. He was ordained in 1910 and began his ordained ministry as a curate at St Peter's, Mansfield and Holy Trinity, Ilkeston. He was an acting chaplain in the Royal Navy from 1915 to 1920 when he became Vicar of Tong, Yorkshire. He was Provost of St Mary's Cathedral, Glasgow from 1927 until his death on 22 October 1933.

Religious titles
Preceded by Ambrose Lethbridge	Provost and rector of St Mary's Cathedral, Glasgow; 1927–1933	Succeeded by Kenneth Warner
