= Jack Woods (priest) =

John Mawhinney (Jack) Woods was Provost of St Andrew's Cathedral, Inverness from 1975 to 1980

Woods was born in 1919, educated at Edinburgh Theological College and ordained in 1959. After a curacy in Kirkcaldy he was Rector of Walpole St Peter from 1960 until his appointment as Provost.

He died in Downham Market on 4 June 2009.

== Notes ==
Religious titles
Preceded by Frank Fairbairn Laming	Provost of St Andrew's Cathedral, Inverness; 1975 to 1980	Succeeded by Arthur Wheatley
