= James Frederick Skinner Gordon =

Scottish Episcopal church minister and antiquarian (1821–1904)

The Reverend James Frederick Skinner Gordon
- Minister of St Andrew's-by-the-Green

Orders
- Ordination: 1843

Personal details
- Born: 1821 Keith, Banffshire
- Died: 23 January 1904 (aged 82) Beith, Ayrshire
- Denomination: Scottish Episcopal Church
- Education: St Andrews University

James Frederick Skinner Gordon (1821–1904) was a Scottish antiquary and a minister in the Scottish Episcopal Church.

== Life ==
James Frederick Skinner Gordon, born at Keith, Banffshire, in 1821, claimed descent from the Gordons of Glenbucket, in Strathdon. Educated at Keith School and then at Madras College, St Andrews, he gained, when fifteen years of age, the Grant bursary at St Andrews University, and graduated there with distinction in 1840, proceeding M.A. in 1842. Appointed organising master in the (Episcopal) national schools at Edinburgh, he was ordained deacon in the Scottish Episcopal Church in 1843 and priest the next year. After a first curacy to the Bishop of Moray, David Low, at Pittenweem, Fifeshire, he removed in 1843 to Forres as curate to Alexander Ewing, afterwards Bishop of Argyll and the Isles at Forres (1843–4). His experiences at Pittenweem are narrated in his Scotichronicon.

In 1844 he was translated to the charge of St Andrew's Episcopal Church, Glasgow, the oldest post-Reformation church in Scotland, and there he remained till 1890, when he retired owing to advancing years. At Glasgow he devoted much energy to the development of Episcopacy, and raised funds wherewith to remodel and endow his church. He was a pioneer in effecting the removal of ruinous tenements and slums in the neighbourhood, thus initiating the movement which resulted in the Glasgow Improvements Act 1866 (29 & 30 Vict. c. lxxxv). His "High Church" tendencies sometimes led to friction in his own denomination; but his earnest philanthropic work brought him general admiration.

He was an enthusiastic Freemason, having been initiated as a student at St Andrews in 1841, and he was the oldest member of the craft at his death. After resigning the charge of St Andrew's-by-the-Green in 1890 he lived in retirement at Beith, Ayrshire, and died there on 23 January 1904. He was interred with masonic honours in Beith cemetery.

== Works ==
Gordon led at the same time a strenuous literary life, closely studying the history of the Catholic and the Episcopal churches in Scotland, and the antiquities of Glasgow. His chief publication was The Ecclesiastical Chronicle for Scotland (4 volumes, Glasgow, 1867), which Alexander Hastie Millar calls "an elaborate and erudite work, which displayed much research"; the first two volumes, entitled Scotichronicon, contain a sketch of the pre-Reformation church, and an extended version of Robert Keith's Catalogue of Scottish Bishops; the third and fourth volumes, entitled Monasticon, give the history of the Scottish monasteries, and biographies of the Roman Catholic bishops of the post-Reformation mission.

Gordon also published (all at Glasgow):

1. Glasghu Facies (a history of Glasgow, written in a lively style), 1872.
2. The Book of the Chronicles of Keith, Grange, Ruthven, Caimey, and Botriphnie, 1880.
3. New edition of Lachlan Shaw's History of the Province of Moray, 1882.
4. Zona, a Description of the Island, 1885.
5. Vade Mecum to and through the Cathedral of St. Kentigern of Glasgow, 1894.

Gordon also contributed an article on the "Scottish Episcopal Church" to the Cyclopædia of Religious Denominations (London, 1853), and wrote on "Meteorology" to several encyclopaedias and journals. In 1857 he received the degree of D.D. from Hobart College, U.S.A.

== Sources ==
- Millar, A. H.; Strong, Rowan (2004). "Gordon, James Frederick Skinner (1821–1904), antiquary and Scottish Episcopal church minister". Oxford Dictionary of National Biography (online ed.). Oxford University Press. doi:10.1093/ref:odnb/33463. (Subscription, Wikipedia Library access or UK public library membership required.)
- Ockerbloom, John Mark, ed. "Gordon, James Frederick Skinner, 1821-1904". "Gordon, J. F. S. (James Frederick Skinner), 1821-1904". Online Books Page. Retrieved 2 October 2022.

Attribution:

- This article incorporates text from a publication now in the public domain: Millar, Alexander Hastie (1912). "Gordon, James Frederick Skinner". In Lee, Sidney (ed.). Dictionary of National Biography (2nd supplement). Vol. 2. London: Smith, Elder & Co. pp. 127–128.
