= Arthur Wheatley (provost) =

Arthur Wheatley (4 March 1931 – 31 January 2003) was a Scottish Episcopalian clergyman who was Provost of St Andrew's Cathedral, Inverness from 1980 to 1983

Wheatley was born on 4 March 1931, educated at Edinburgh Theological College. He was ordained in 1970. After a curacy at St Salvador, Dundee he held incumbencies in Lossiemouth and Elgin until his appointment as Provost. Wheatley died on 31 January 2003, at the age of 71.

== Notes ==
Religious titles
Preceded by Jack Woods	Provost of St Andrew's Cathedral, Inverness; 1980 to 1983	Succeeded by Gordon Reid
