= Vernon Staley =

Vernon Staley (1852–1933) was a Church of England priest, writer, and liturgist who was known for his Anglo-Catholic views. He was the author of The Catholic Religion: A Manual of Instruction for Members of the Anglican Communion, first published in 1893. By 1908 15 editions of this book had been published. Staley was born in Rochdale, Lancashire, and trained for the ministry at Chichester Theological College. In 1901 he was appointed provost of St. Andrew's Cathedral, Inverness, where he served for ten years before moving to Ickford, Buckinghamshire where he was rector of St. Nicholas church until his death.
