= Qualified chapel =

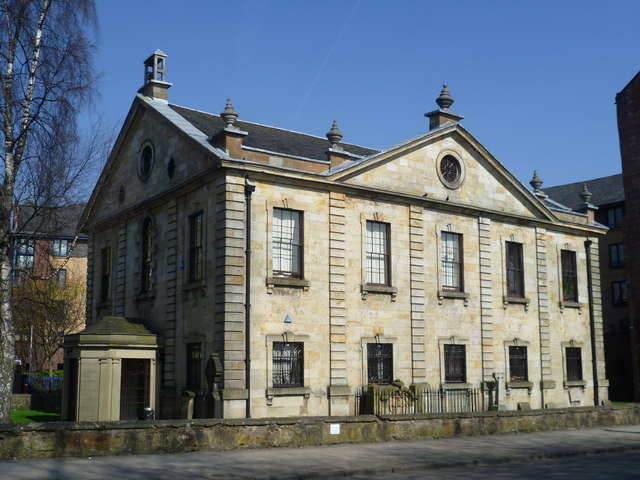
St Andrew's-by-the-Green, Glasgow; built as a qualified chapel (1751)

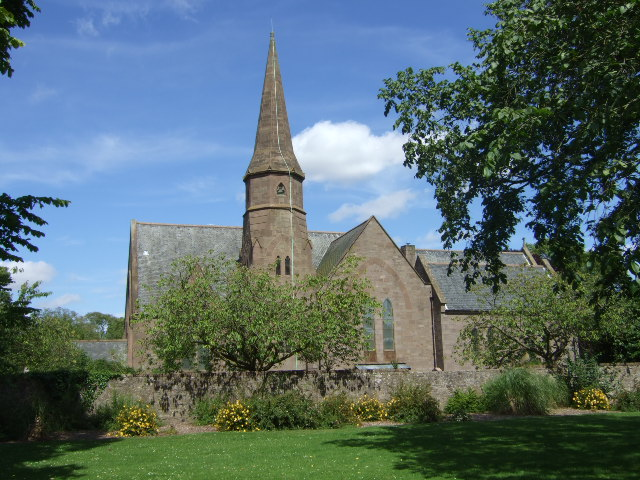
St Peter's Qualified Chapel in Montrose, Angus (rebuilt in 1858); only joined the Episcopal Church in 1920

A qualified chapel, in 18th- and 19th-century Scotland, was an Episcopal congregation that worshipped liturgically but accepted the Hanoverian monarchy and thereby "qualified" under the Scottish Episcopalians Act 1711 for exemption from the penal laws against the Episcopal Church of Scotland.

After the Glorious Revolution of 1688, many Scottish Episcopalians, holding the divine right of kings, remained true to their oaths to James VII and II and refused in conscience to recognise or pray for William III and Mary II. The Episcopalians were ejected from parish churches by the Presbyterians. After the Jacobite risings of 1715 and 1745 in which many Episcopalians participated, harsher restrictions were imposed on Episcopalians under the Toleration Act 1746 and Penal Act 1748. Priests who did not swear allegiance to George II, pray for him by name and register their Letters of Orders were forbidden to minister to more than four people ("the prescribed four") at any one time. The penalty for a first offence was imprisonment for six months; thereafter the penalty was transportation to the West Indies plantations for life. Penalties for lay people worshipping at Episcopalian services included being prevented from holding any public office, deprivation of the right to vote and being barred from admission to the universities and colleges. Further persecution followed – no clergyman ordained by a Scottish bishop could "qualify" to conduct ordinary and open worship.

The 18th century saw the establishment of qualified chapels where worship was conducted according to the English Book of Common Prayer and where congregations, led by priests ordained by bishops of the Church of England or the Church of Ireland, were willing to pray for the Hanoverian monarchs. Such chapels drew their congregations from English people living in Scotland and from Scottish Episcopalians who were not bound to the Jacobite cause. These were independent congregations, not recognised by the bishops of the Episcopal Church of Scotland, and refusing to accept the authority of those bishops.

The two forms of Episcopalianism existed side by side, one made almost invisible by penal laws and the other one tolerated and public.

The divide was largely ended in 1788 when Charles Edward Stuart died in exile. Unwilling to recognise his brother Henry Benedict Stuart, who was a cardinal in the Catholic Church, as his heir, the Episcopalians elected to recognise the House of Hanover and offer allegiance to George III. At the repeal of the penal laws in 1792 there were twenty-four qualified chapels in Scotland. Nonjuring and qualified congregations gradually united, particularly after the 1804 Convocation of Laurencekirk where the Episcopal Church adopted the Thirty-Nine Articles. By 1850 all but one of the former qualified chapels had joined the Episcopal Church. The last separate qualified chapel, St Peter's in Montrose, Angus, founded in 1722, only joined the Episcopal Church in 1920.

Following the practice in the Church of England, qualified chapels installed organs and hired musicians, singing in the liturgy as well as metrical psalms, while the non-jurors had to worship covertly and less elaborately. After the two branches united, the former non-juring branch absorbed the musical and liturgical traditions of the qualified churches.

== See also ==
- St Andrew's-by-the-Green, Glasgow, a qualified chapel, built 1750
- History of the Scottish Episcopal Church
