= Sarah Murray (priest) =

British Anglican priest

The Very Reverend Sarah Murray
- Provost of Inverness Cathedral
- Church: Scottish Episcopal Church
- Diocese: Diocese of Moray, Ross and Caithness
- In office: October 2017 to present
- Predecessor: Alex Gordon

Personal details
- Born: 3 December 1970 (age 55)
- Denomination: Anglicanism
- Education: University of Aberdeen

Sarah Elisabeth Murray (born 3 December 1970) is a British Anglican priest. Since 2017, she has served as Provost of Inverness Cathedral in the Scottish Episcopal Church.

== Early and personal life ==
Murray was born on 3 December 1970 in Newport, Isle of Wight, England. She was educated at St Mary's Hall, an all-girls private school in Brighton.

== Ordained ministry ==
Murray studied at the University of Aberdeen, graduating with a Bachelor of Theology (BTh) degree in 2012, and trained for ordination at the Theological Institute of the Scottish Episcopal Church. She was ordained as a deacon in 2013 and as a priest in 2014. From 2013 to 2016, she served as a curate in the Isla Deveron Group in the Diocese of Moray, Ross and Caithness.

In July 2016, Murray was installed as the Vice-Provost of the Cathedral Church of Saint Andrew, Inverness (commonly called Inverness Cathedral). She became Provost of Inverness Cathedral in October 2017.
