= Sarah Jane Murray =

Irish-born academic, screenwriter and filmmaker

Sarah Jane Murray is an Irish-born academic and Emmy-nominated filmmaker who works in the United States. She teaches great books, creative writing, film making, interactive storytelling (AR, VR, XR, story for game design), and the ethics of storytelling at Baylor University as a Professor of Great Texts and Creative Writing.

Born in Ireland, she graduated from Auburn University with a BA in French and Philosophy, and studied at the École normale supérieure de lettres et sciences humaines in Lyon while also earning her MA and PhD from Princeton University.

In 2014, she was nominated for an Emmy (as the writer) for Primary Concern, a documentary film about the primary care crisis in the United States, that was presented by GA Public Television and aired nationally on PBS. In 2018, she was recognized as one of the fifty women changing the entertainment and media industry, and most likely to help bring about gender parity in Hollywood. In 2023, she set up the Greats Story Lab at the intersection of film, education, and emerging technologies. Courtney Smith joined her as co-founder in 2024.

== Books ==
- From Plato to Lancelot: A Preface to Chrétien de Troyes (Syracuse UP, 2008)
- The first translation of the 14th-century Ovide Moralisé (D.S. Brewer, 2023)
- Basics of Story Design: Twenty Steps to an Insanely Great Screenplay (AnderEd, 2017)
- Ralph’s Christmas Quest (CatSpring, 2019) (children's book)
