= List of Glasgow Subway stations =

Stations on the Glasgow subway

Map of the Glasgow Subway

The Glasgow Subway is an underground rail service in Scotland that serves the city of Glasgow. The Subway is the Third oldest underground railway in the world.

The system comprises one circular line, with fifteen stations and two sets of rail that operate in alternative directions (Outer Circle clockwise; Inner Circle anticlockwise). With the system travelling underneath the River Clyde and River Kelvin.

== Stations ==
Listed in clockwise order from Partick.

Name	Image	Transport Interchange	Serves	Usage
Partick (replaced Merkland Street)		Partick Station; First Bus; McGill's; Avondale	Riverside Museum; Hamilton Crescent Cricket Ground	966,192
Kelvinhall (named Partick Cross until 1977)		First Bus; McGill's	Kelvin Hall; Kelvingrove Art Gallery and Museum; Kelvingrove Park; Byres Road (south); University of Glasgow; West Glasgow Ambulatory Care Hospital	661,359
Hillhead		First Bus	University of Glasgow; Glasgow Botanic Gardens; Byres Road (north); Ashton Lane	1,852,342
Kelvinbridge		Kelvinbridge Park & Ride; First Bus	Great Western Road; Kelvingrove Park; University of Glasgow; St Mary's Cathedral; The Glasgow Academy	941,008
St George's Cross		First Bus West Coast Motors	Great Western Road; Firhill Stadium	524,638
Cowcaddens		First Bus	The Willow Tearooms; Glasgow School of Art; Glasgow Caledonian University; Glasgow Kelvin College; St Aloysius' College; Glasgow Sculpture Studios Gallery	460,577
Buchanan Street		Queen Street Station; Buchanan bus station	Buchanan Street; Buchanan Galleries; Glasgow City Chambers; George Square; University of Strathclyde; Glasgow Royal Concert Hall; Omniplex	2,420,995
St Enoch		Glasgow Central Station; Argyle Street Station; First Bus; McGill's; Stagecoach West Scotland	Argyle Street; St. Enoch Centre; St Andrew's Cathedral; River Clyde	1,908,029
Bridge Street		Bridge Street Park & Ride; First Bus	O2 Academy Glasgow; Glasgow Sheriff Court	380,187
West Street				96,593
Shields Road		Shields Road Park & Ride First Bus	Scotland Street School Museum	446,491
Kinning Park				243,074
Cessnock		First Bus; McGill's	Glasgow Science Centre (including Glasgow Tower, the IMAX cinema); BBC Scotland; STV (TV network)	442,523
Ibrox (named Copland Road until 1977)		First Bus; McGill's	Ibrox Stadium	487,543
Govan (named Govan Cross until 1977)		First Bus; McGill's	Govan Old Parish Church; Riverside Museum (via Govan-Partick Bridge)	925,541
