= West End, Glasgow =

West End
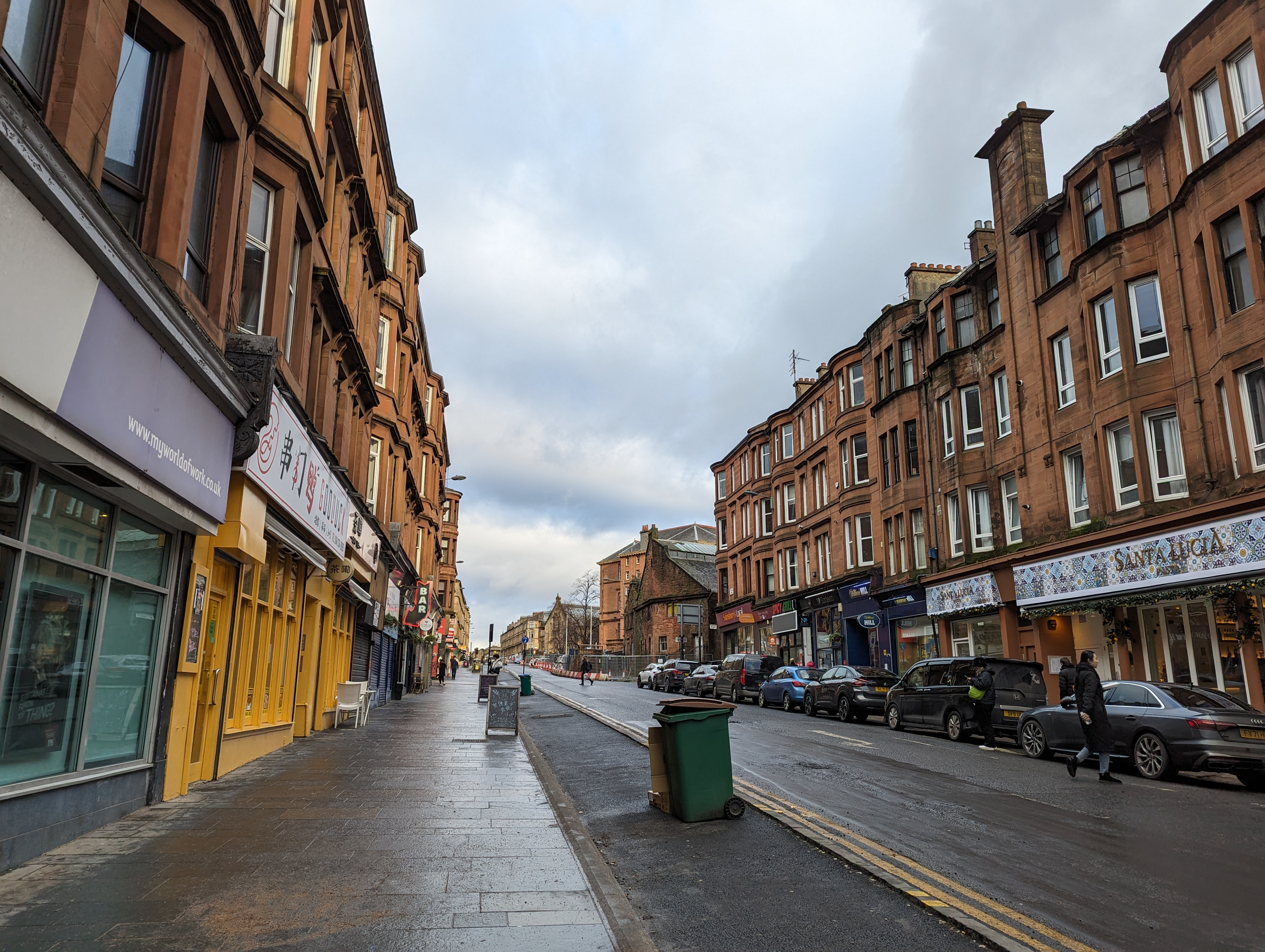
- Byres Road
- Council area: City of Glasgow
- Country: Scotland
- Sovereign state: United Kingdom
- Postcode district: G11, G12, G13
- Dialling code: 0141
- Police: Scotland
- Fire: Scottish
- Ambulance: Scottish

The West End is an affluent district of Glasgow, Scotland, located to the west of the city centre. Renowned for its historic architecture, green spaces and vibrant social scene, the area is widely regarded as one of Glasgow's most desirable neighbourhoods. It is home to a wide range of cafés, restaurants, independent shops and cultural venues, as well as major institutions such as the University of Glasgow and the Kelvingrove Art Gallery and Museum. The district also hosts festivals and community events, including the West End Festival.

Developed largely during the 19th century as Glasgow expanded westwards, the West End features extensive Victorian and Edwardian architecture, including sandstone tenements, terraces and villas. Much of the area is centred around the River Kelvin and incorporates notable green spaces such as Kelvingrove Park and the Glasgow Botanic Gardens. The district is broadly contiguous with surrounding neighbourhoods including Partick, Hillhead and Hyndland, and lies between the River Clyde to the south and the northern districts of the city.

== History ==
The West End of Glasgow developed primarily during the 19th century as the city expanded westwards from its medieval and early industrial core. Originally composed of rural land, small estates and scattered settlements, the area was transformed by rapid urban growth driven by industrialisation and rising wealth among Glasgow’s merchant and professional classes.

=== Early development ===
Before large-scale urbanisation, much of the West End consisted of country estates and agricultural land situated along the River Kelvin and surrounding hills. Estates such as Kelvinside and Hillhead were gradually subdivided in the late 18th and early 19th centuries as Glasgow's population expanded.

The construction of early roads and bridges over the River Kelvin improved access to the area, encouraging residential development and linking it more closely to the growing city centre.

=== Victorian expansion ===
The most significant phase of development occurred in the Victorian era, particularly from the mid-19th century onwards. Wealthy residents began moving westward from the overcrowded city centre, leading to the construction of sandstone tenements, terraces and villas.

A key milestone in the area's growth was the relocation of the University of Glasgow to Gilmorehill in 1870. This move established the West End as a centre of education and intellectual life, attracting academic institutions, students and supporting businesses.

During this period, the layout of major streets such as Byres Road and Great Western Road was formalised, shaping the modern structure of the district.

=== 20th century developments ===
In the early 20th century, the West End continued to develop as a residential and cultural district. Many of its tenement buildings were constructed or extended during this time, reinforcing the area's dense urban character.

Following the decline of heavy industry along the River Clyde, parts of the southern West End, particularly Finnieston and Yorkhill, underwent significant redevelopment. Former industrial land was gradually replaced with residential, commercial and cultural facilities.

=== Late 20th century to present ===
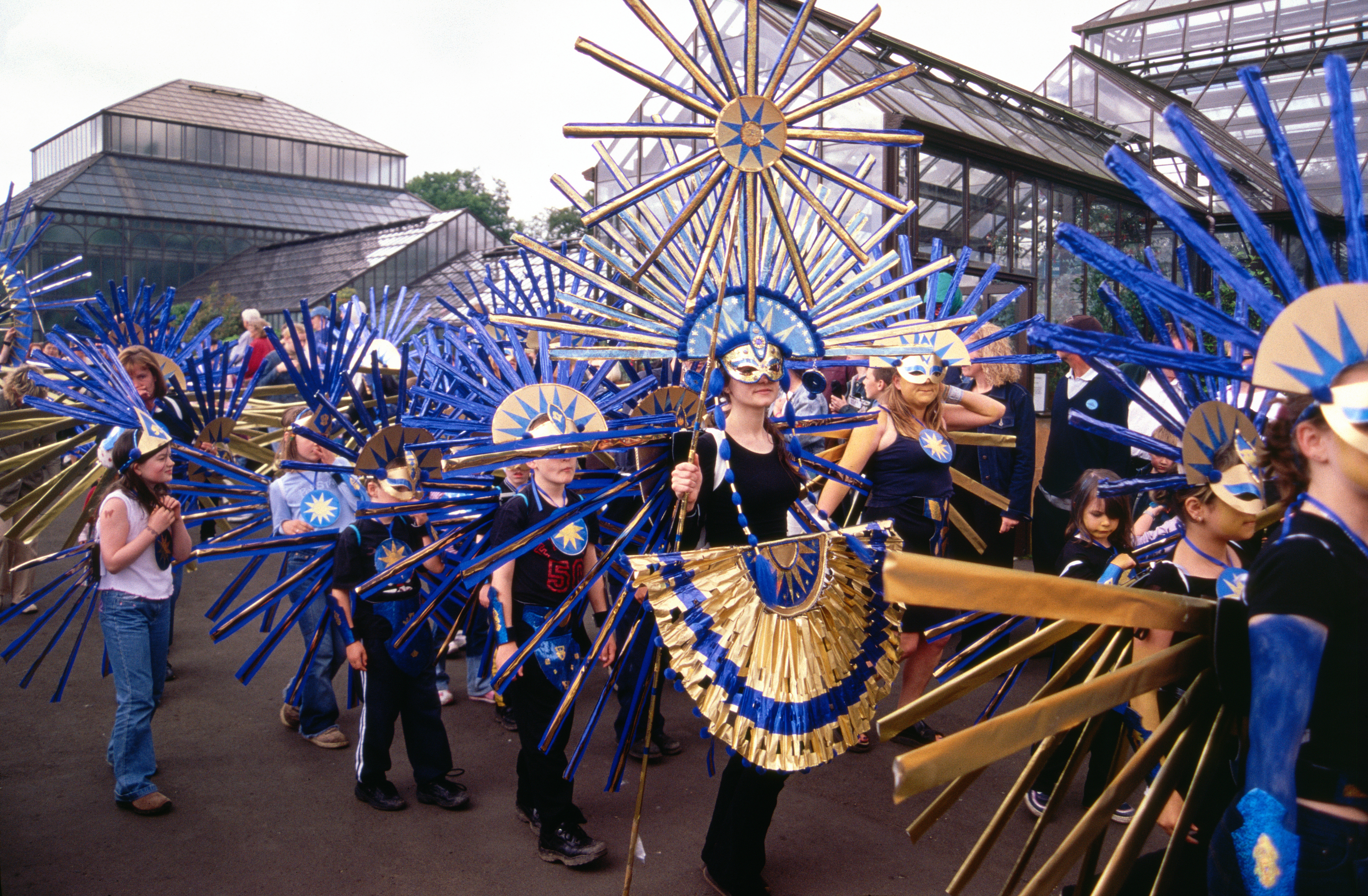
West End Festival near Glasgow Botanic Gardens, 2002.

From the late 20th century onwards, the West End experienced a process of regeneration and gentrification. The growth of the service sector, creative industries and higher education contributed to rising demand for housing and commercial space.

The area became increasingly associated with arts, culture and independent businesses, particularly around Byres Road and Finnieston. Major cultural institutions, including the Kelvingrove Art Gallery and Museum and the Glasgow Botanic Gardens, continued to play a central role in shaping the district's identity.

Today, the West End is recognised as one of Glasgow's most historic and culturally significant districts, combining Victorian heritage with modern urban redevelopment.

== Geography ==
The West End of Glasgow is located immediately to the west of the city centre, forming a transitional area between central Glasgow and the outer western suburbs. It is broadly centred around the lower reaches of the River Kelvin, which flows southwards through the district before joining the River Clyde.

The West End is largely contiguous with neighbouring districts such as Hillhead, Partick, Dowanhill and Kelvinside, while also extending towards Finnieston to the south and Maryhill to the north. The area forms part of a continuous urban fabric linking the city centre with Glasgow's western residential corridors.

To the south, the West End is bounded by the River Clyde and the former industrial and dockland areas that have undergone extensive regeneration. To the north, it transitions into more residential and suburban districts, while to the west it connects towards areas such as Hyndland, Broomhill and Jordanhill.

A defining geographical feature of the district is the River Kelvin valley, which provides a natural green corridor through the urban environment. The river is flanked by parks and walkways, including Kelvingrove Park, and eventually meets the Clyde near Yorkhill.

The West End contains several important transport and road corridors, including Great Western Road and Dumbarton Road, which run east–west, and Byres Road, which acts as a central north–south axis. These routes converge towards the city centre, reinforcing the West End's role as a key connector between Glasgow's inner and outer areas.

Overall, the geography of the West End is characterised by a combination of dense Victorian urban development, river valleys, and green spaces, creating a distinctive and varied urban landscape.

== Governance ==
The West End of Glasgow is represented at local level by several neighbourhood and city governance structures within the Glasgow City Council area. While the West End is not an official administrative district, it is commonly associated with multiple council wards, including Hillhead, Partick East/Kelvindale, and parts of Anderston/City, depending on specific boundaries.

Local community representation is provided through community councils such as the Partick Community Council and the Hillhead Community Council, which act as consultative bodies between residents and the city council on planning, transport and local services.

At Scottish Parliament level, the West End primarily falls within the Glasgow Kelvin and Maryhill constituency, which covers much of the central and western parts of the city, including the university area and surrounding neighbourhoods.

For elections to the UK Parliament, most of the West End is included within the Glasgow North constituency, while some southern areas fall within neighbouring constituencies depending on boundary changes.

== Economy ==
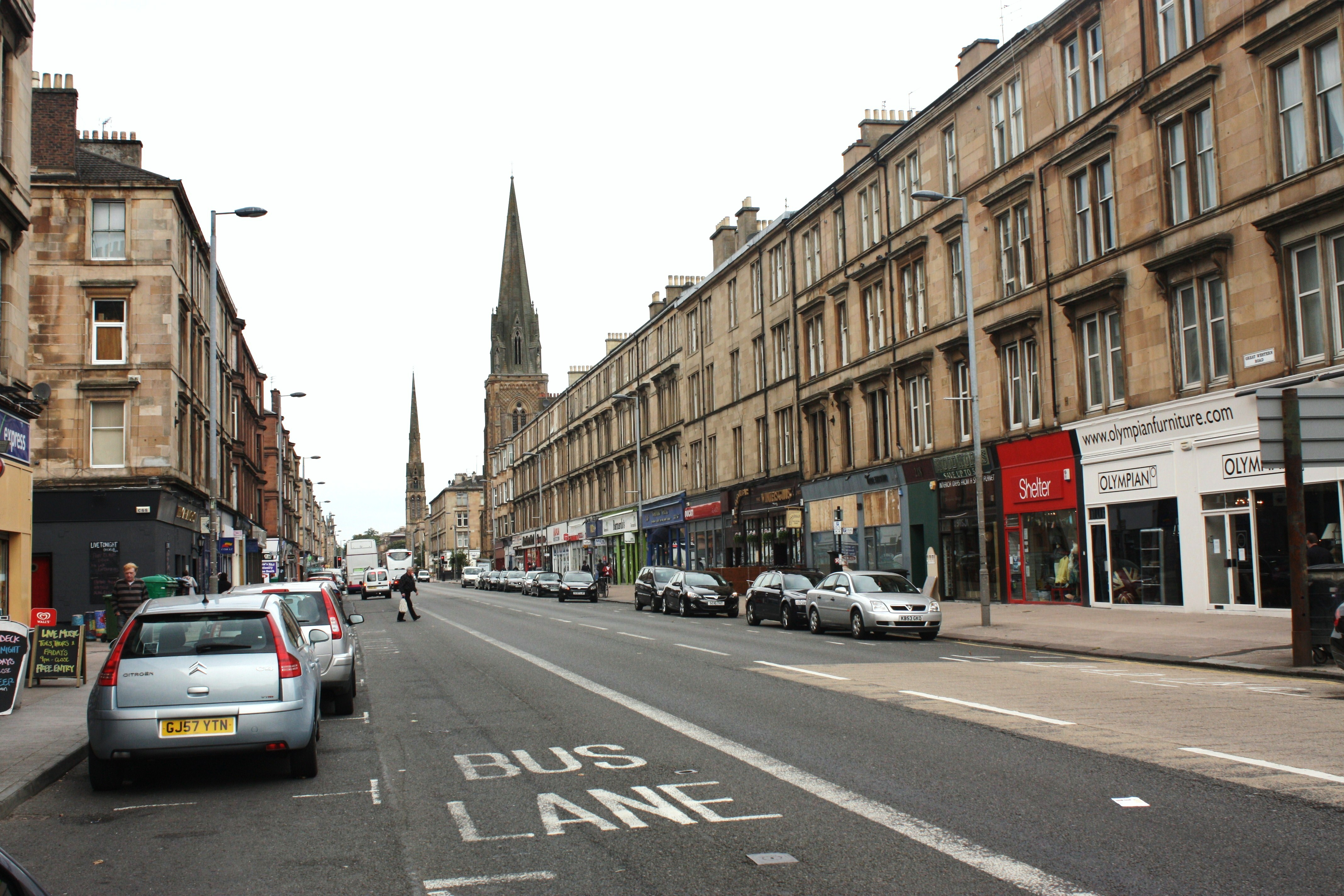
Great Western Road

The West End of Glasgow is a major economic hub within the city, characterised by a diverse mix of offices, retail, hospitality and cultural industries. The area contains a high concentration of independent shops, restaurants, bars and creative enterprises, particularly along Byres Road, Great Western Road and surrounding neighbourhood streets.

In recent decades, the West End has become strongly associated with the arts, education and the creative economy. The presence of the University of Glasgow has contributed to a significant student population and a wide range of research, academic and spin-off enterprises in the area.

The district is also a major centre for tourism and cultural activity. Key attractions such as Kelvingrove Art Gallery and Museum and the Glasgow Botanic Gardens draw large numbers of visitors, supporting a strong hospitality sector including hotels, guesthouses and restaurants.

The West End has a notable concentration of creative industries, including design studios, media companies and independent production businesses, many of which are located in converted tenement buildings and former industrial spaces. Finnieston, on the southern edge of the district, has in particular developed into a major food, drink and nightlife destination.

Retail activity in the West End is dominated by independent businesses rather than large chain stores, with areas such as Ashton Lane and Byres Road known for boutique shopping and specialist traders. This contributes to the district's reputation as one of Glasgow's key centres for independent commerce.

== Culture and community ==
The West End of Glasgow is widely regarded as one of the city's most culturally active districts, with a strong association with the arts, music, and independent creative life. Its proximity to the University of Glasgow has helped shape a long-standing student and academic presence, contributing to a diverse and cosmopolitan community.

The area is a key centre for festivals and cultural events, most notably the annual West End Festival, one of Glasgow's largest community arts festivals. The festival includes street performances, parades, live music, theatre and community-led events held across venues and public spaces throughout the district.

The West End has also played a significant role in Glasgow's live music and performance scene, with numerous small venues, pubs and cultural spaces supporting emerging artists. Areas such as Byres Road, Ashton Lane and Finnieston are known for their concentration of nightlife, independent venues and creative industries.

=== Museums and art galleries ===
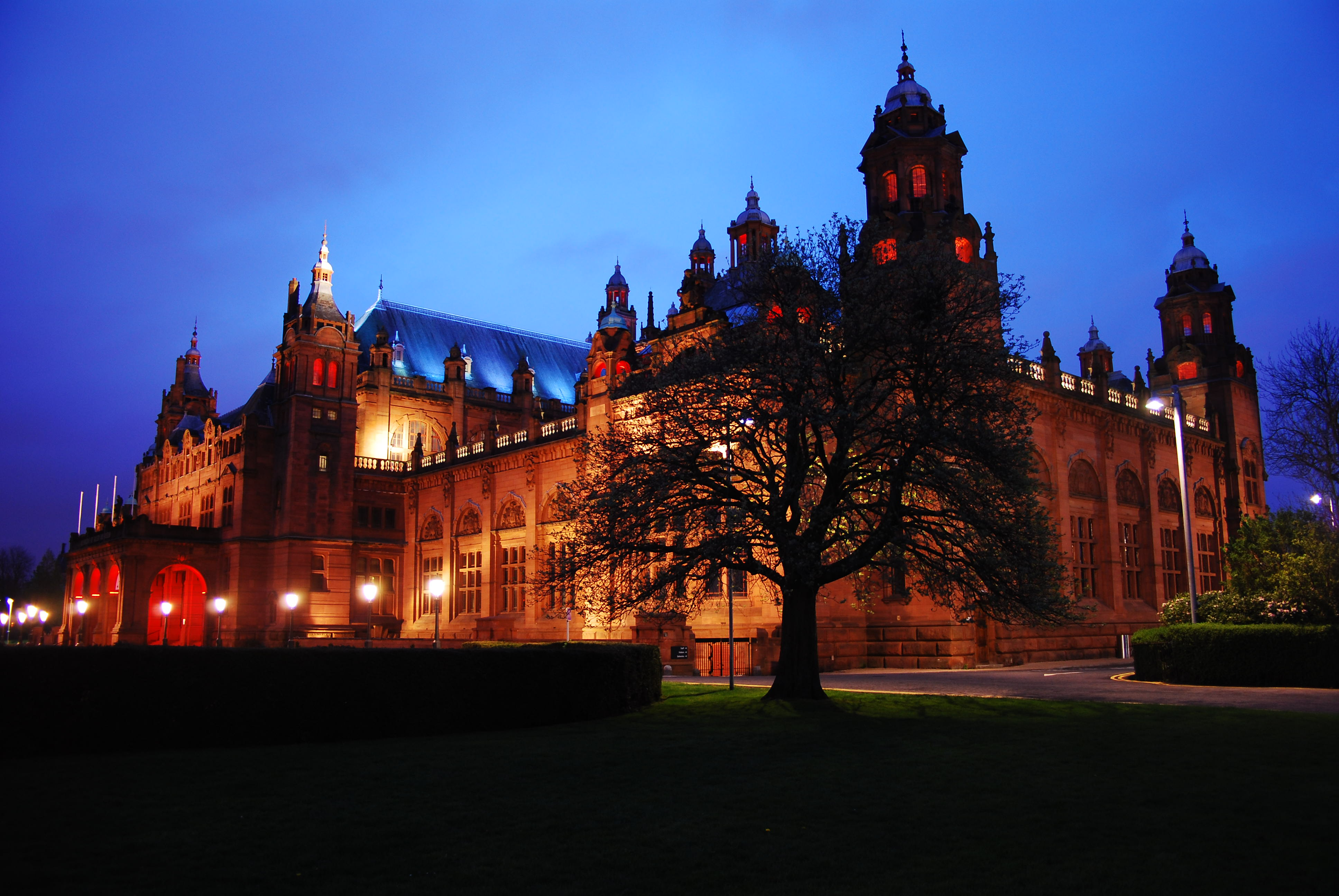
Kelvingrove Art Gallery and Museum

The West End of Glasgow is home to some of the city's most important cultural institutions, as well as a number of smaller private galleries. The district's artistic identity is closely linked to its academic and architectural heritage, particularly around the University of Glasgow and the surrounding Kelvingrove area.

The most prominent gallery in the West End is the Kelvingrove Art Gallery and Museum, one of Scotland's most visited cultural venues. Opened in 1901, it houses extensive collections of fine art, natural history and decorative arts, and serves as a major public exhibition space for both permanent and temporary displays.

Nearby, the Hunterian Museum and Art Gallery at the University of Glasgow is the oldest public museum in Scotland. Its collections include fine art, scientific instruments and archaeological artefacts, with significant holdings relating to Scottish art and history. The gallery is located within the university campus at Gilmorehill, forming part of the area's wider cultural and academic landscape.

=== Parks and public spaces ===
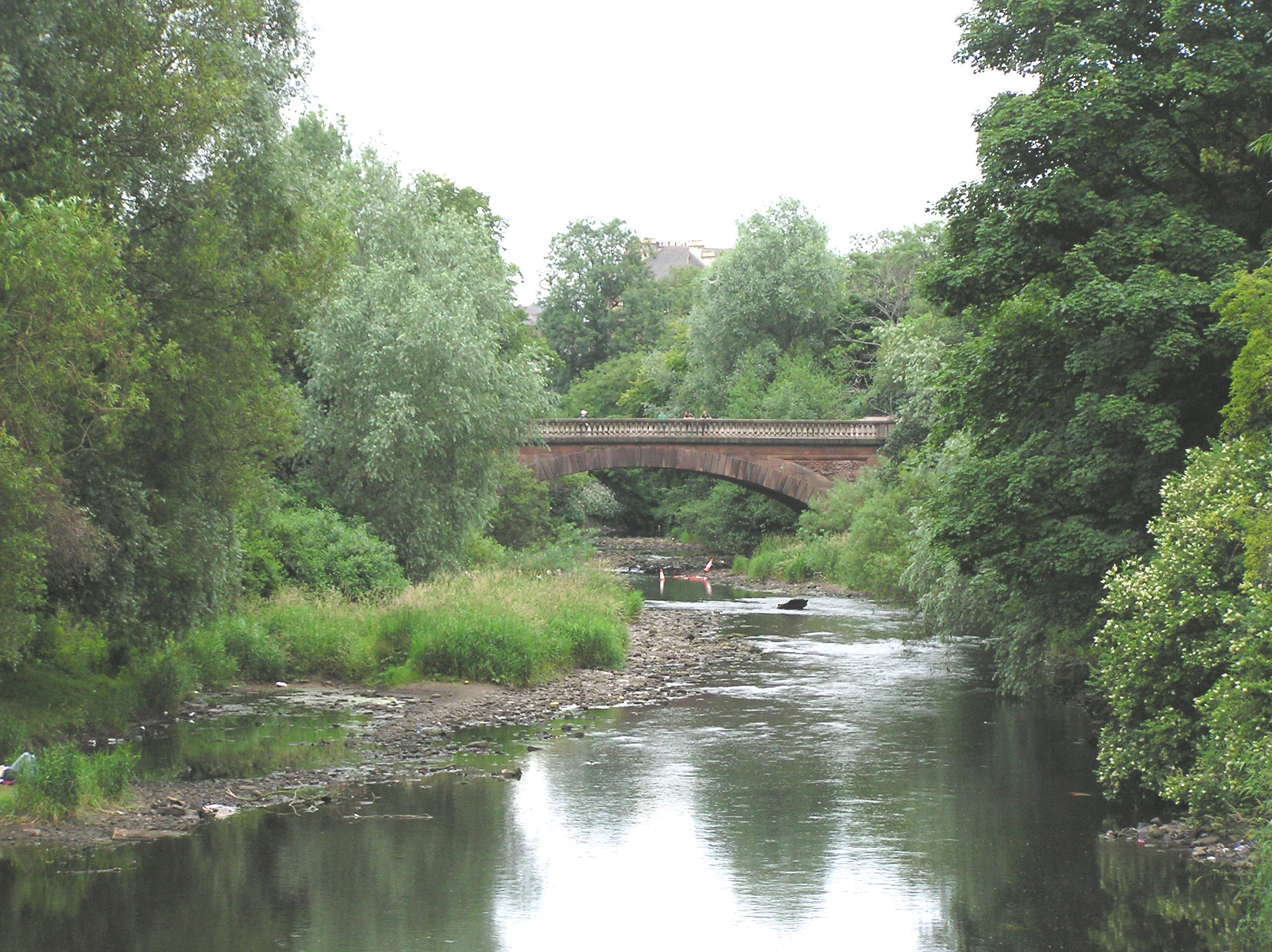
Kelvingrove Park

The West End of Glasgow contains some of the city's most significant public parks and green spaces, many of which are centred around the historic course of the River Kelvin. These spaces form an important part of the district's urban character, providing recreational areas, landscaped gardens and walking routes within a densely built environment.

The largest and most prominent green space is Kelvingrove Park, a Victorian-era public park laid out in the 1850s. The park extends along the banks of the River Kelvin and is bordered by major West End institutions, including the University of Glasgow and the Kelvingrove district. It contains landscaped walks, bridges and formal gardens, and is one of the most frequently visited parks in the city.

To the north-west of Kelvingrove Park are the Glasgow Botanic Gardens, established in 1817 and relocated to their present site in 1842. The gardens are known for their extensive plant collections and historic glasshouses, including the Kibble Palace, and serve as both a scientific and recreational resource.

Smaller public spaces are also distributed throughout the West End, including neighbourhood gardens, riverside walkways and squares associated with residential developments in areas such as Hillhead, Dowanhill and Hyndland. The River Kelvin walkway provides a continuous green corridor linking Kelvingrove Park with the Botanic Gardens and further north towards Maryhill.

Together, these parks and public spaces contribute to the West End's reputation as one of the greenest and most liveable areas of Glasgow, combining Victorian landscape design with modern recreational use.

=== Architecture ===
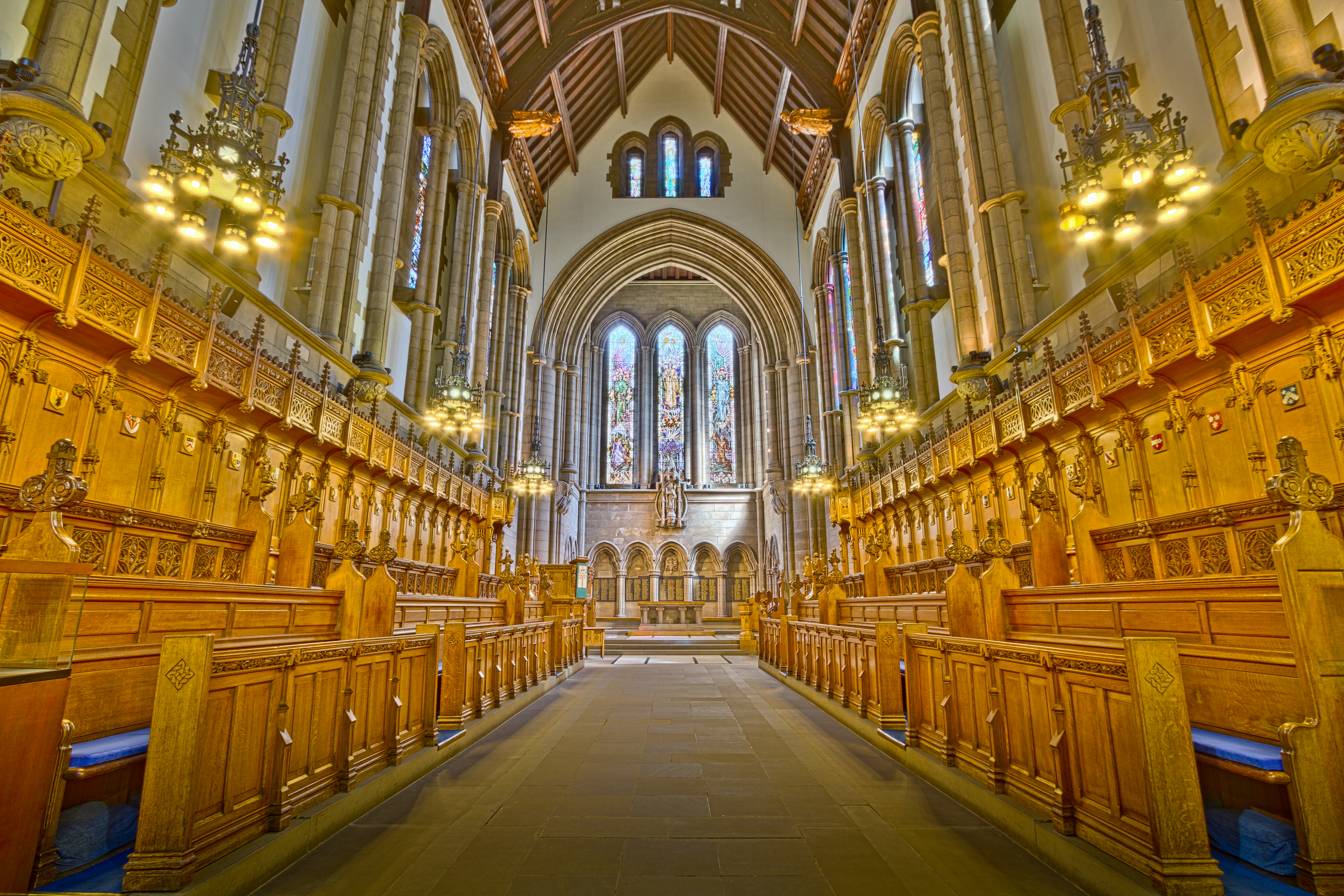
University of Glasgow Memorial Chapel's interior

The West End of Glasgow is noted for its diverse and historically significant architectural landscape, which reflects the city's expansion during the 19th and early 20th centuries. The area is particularly associated with Victorian and Edwardian design, much of it built during Glasgow's rapid industrial growth and the westward movement of affluent residential districts.

A defining feature of the West End is its extensive use of blonde and red sandstone tenements, terraces and villas, many of which were constructed for middle- and upper-class residents. These buildings are often characterised by ornate stonework, bay windows, and detailed cornicing, reflecting the influence of Victorian civic pride and domestic architecture.

The district also contains important examples of Gothic Revival and ecclesiastical architecture, including major landmarks such as St Mary's Cathedral, designed by Sir George Gilbert Scott. The cathedral is one of the most prominent Gothic Revival structures in the city and contributes to the area's strong architectural identity.

In contrast to its residential streets, the West End is also home to institutional and cultural architecture, most notably the Gilmorehill campus of the University of Glasgow. The university buildings, also designed in the Gothic Revival style, are among the most recognisable in Scotland and form a major landmark overlooking the River Kelvin.

The architecture of the West End is further enriched by its parks and public spaces, including Kelvingrove Park, which is framed by surrounding terraces and bridges. This combination of planned urban development, academic institutions and historic residential architecture has contributed to the West End's reputation as one of Glasgow's most architecturally distinctive areas.

== Transport ==
=== Subway ===
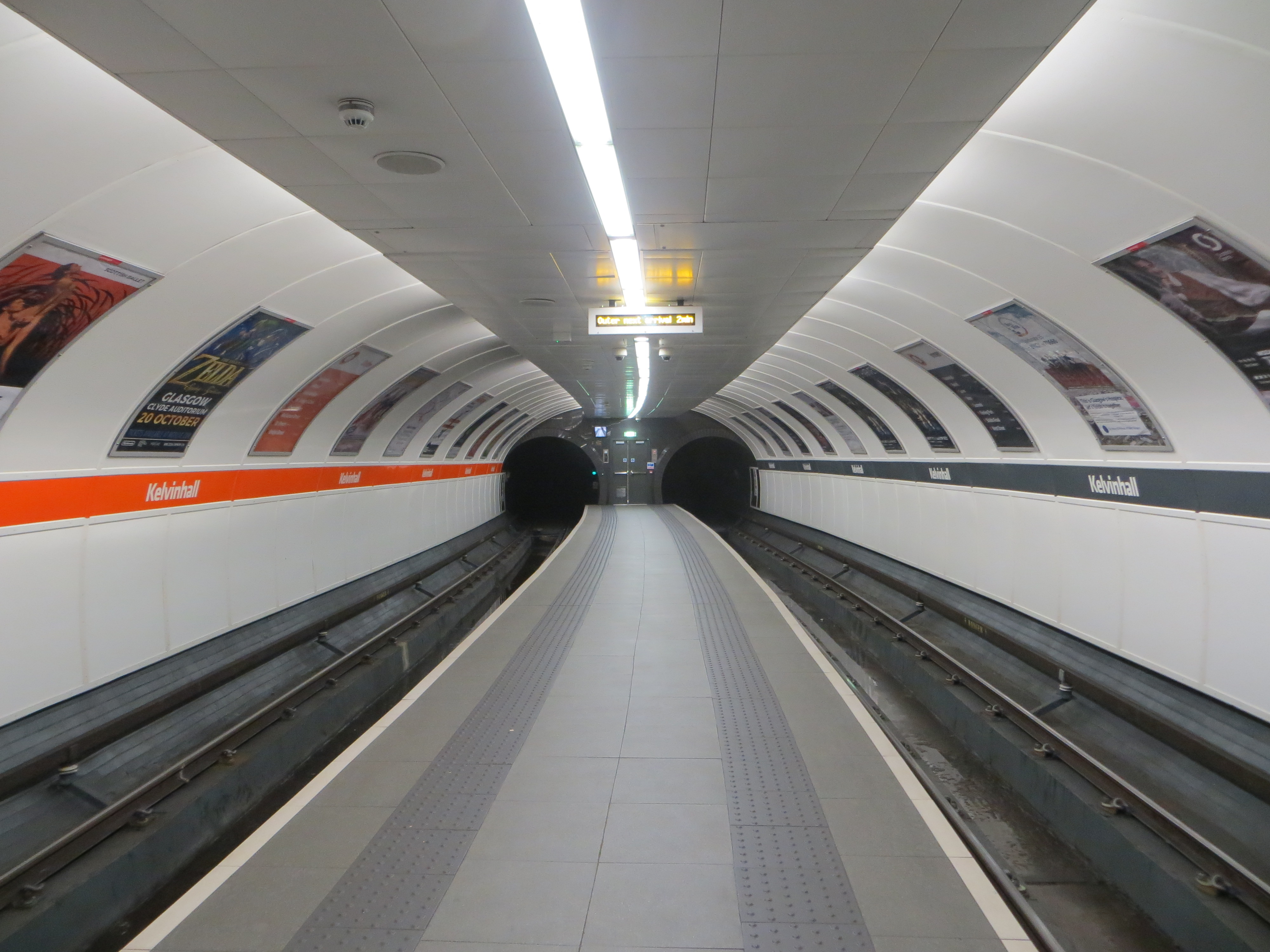
Kelvinhall subway station

The West End of Glasgow is served by the Glasgow Subway, with several stations located within the district, including Hillhead, Kelvinhall and Partick. These stations provide frequent services connecting the West End with the city centre and the south side of Glasgow.

Partick station functions as a major interchange, linking subway services with suburban rail and bus routes. The subway system operates as a circular route, allowing direct access between key areas of the city without the need for transfers.

The Hillhead station, located near Byres Road and the University of Glasgow, is among the busiest stops in the West End due to its proximity to shops, restaurants and academic buildings.

=== Buses ===
The West End of Glasgow is well served by local bus services operated primarily by First Glasgow and other operators, providing connections across the city and surrounding areas.

Major routes run along key corridors such as Great Western Road, Byres Road and Dumbarton Road, linking the district with the city centre and other parts of Glasgow. Eastbound services generally connect to the city centre, including Buchanan Bus Station and central shopping areas, while westbound routes extend towards Partick, Scotstoun and Clydebank.

Interchange with rail and subway services is available at Partick station, which acts as a major transport hub for the West End.

== Education ==
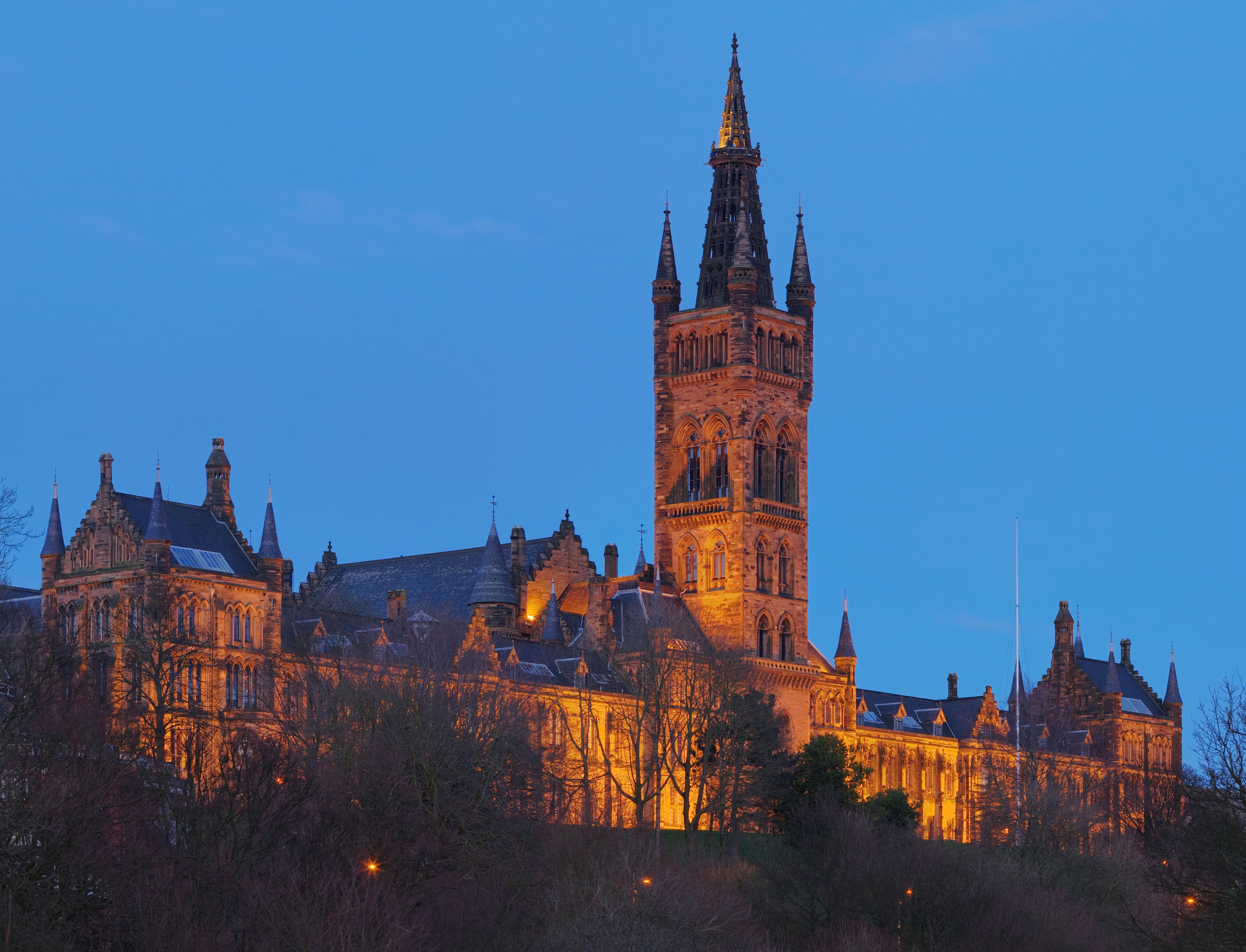
The night view of the University of Glasgow's main building

The University of Glasgow is a major centre of higher education in the West End, located at Gilmorehill. Founded in 1451, it is one of the oldest universities in the English-speaking world and moved to its present West End campus in 1870. The main campus includes a number of notable buildings in the Gothic Revival style, designed by Sir George Gilbert Scott.

Glasgow Academy is an independent school in the West End, established in 1845. The school operates primary and secondary divisions and occupies several buildings in the Hillhead area.

The district is also served by a number of state schools, including Hillhead High School, a secondary school located on Oakfield Avenue. The school has longstanding links with the University of Glasgow and serves much of the surrounding West End.

Several primary schools are located within or close to the West End, including Hillhead Primary School and Dowanhill Primary School. Together, these institutions contribute to the area's strong educational character.

== Religion ==
St Mary's Cathedral is a late 19th-century cathedral of the Scottish Episcopal Church in the West End. It is designed in the Gothic Revival style by Sir George Gilbert Scott and is a Category A listed building. The cathedral is one of the most prominent ecclesiastical buildings in the area.

Kelvinside Hillhead Parish Church is a parish church of the Church of Scotland located in the West End. Construction was completed in 1898 to designs by John James Burnet in a distinctive Victorian style. The church occupies a prominent position overlooking the River Kelvin.

St Silas' Church is an Episcopal church in the West End, completed in the 1870s. The building is designed in the Gothic style and forms part of the area's wider collection of historic religious architecture.
