= Maclay Murray & Spens =

UK law firm

Maclay Murray & Spens LLP
- Headquarters: Glasgow, United Kingdom
- No. of offices: 4
- Offices: Aberdeen, Edinburgh, Glasgow, London
- No. of lawyers: 143
- No. of employees: 450
- Major practice areas: General practice, Commercial law
- Key people: Kenneth Shand (CEO); Michael Livingston (Chairman)
- Revenue: ▲£44.3m (2015/16)
- Profit per equity partner: £248,000 (2015/16)
- Date founded: 1871 - Glasgow
- Founder: David Maclay, David Murray and John Spens
- Company type: Limited liability partnership
- Website: www.mms.co.uk

Maclay Murray & Spens LLP was a top 100 UK law firm headquartered in Glasgow with offices in Aberdeen, Edinburgh and London, and was one of the UK's leading full service commercial law firms.

In July 2017, it was announced that Maclay, Murray & Spens would merge with Dentons, the largest law firm in the world by number of lawyers. The process completed at midnight on 27 October 2017 with the wholesale adoption of the Dentons brand.

== About Maclay Murray & Spens ==
Maclay Murray & Spens was founded in 1871 in Glasgow by David Maclay, David Murray and John Spens as the first law firm in Scotland with a specifically commercial practice.

Part of Scotland's 'Big Four', Maclay Murray & Spens was at the time of its merger with Dentons one of only a few remaining large independent Scottish law firms; In that capacity, the firm was the exclusive Scottish member of the international law firm network LexMundi, allowing it to service its clients' international needs.

The firm at the time of its merger employed over 450 people, was ranked in the Legal 500 as a top tier firm, and had over 40 lawyers ranked as leaders in their field in Chambers 2016. The firm's practice areas spanned:

Banking & Finance	Capital Projects	Commercial Dispute Resolution	Construction & Engineering	Corporate
Oil & Gas	Employment	Pensions & Benefits	EU, Competition & Regulatory	Housing & Care
Intellectual Property & Technology	Planning & Environmental	Private Client, Property and Tax		

A complete history of the firm was published in October 2017 and entitled 'Maclay Murray & Spens, A History: The Past is Prologue' by Saamir Nizam.

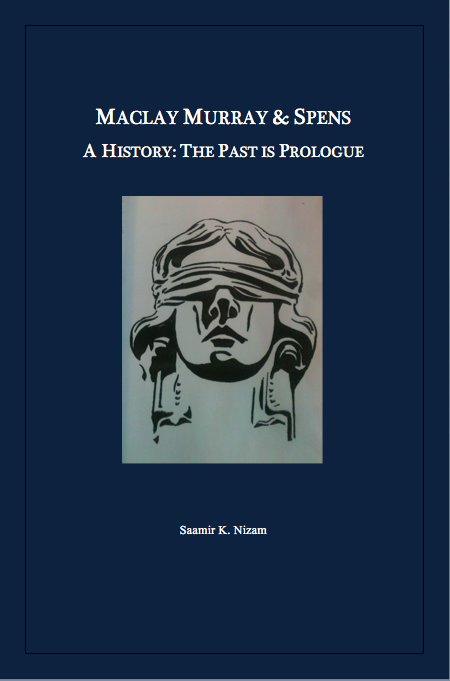
Maclay Murray & Spens, A History: The Past is Prologue

== Notable cases/deals ==
- Advised on the £3.8 billion merger of Standard Life and Aberdeen Asset Management.
- Advised on equity placing to raise £250m and admission to the London Stock Exchange in respect of The PRS REIT PLC.
- Advised on the £34.1 million flotation of FreeAgent on the London Alternative Investment Market (AIM).
- Advised on the £650 million sale of Scottish Widows Investment Partnership Group by Lloyds Banking Group to Aberdeen Asset Management.
- Advised on the £265 million sale of Deutsche Asset Management (UK) to Aberdeen Asset Management.

== Industry awards ==
IP Excellence Awards 2017:

- Best IP Law Practice In Scotland - Winner.

Scottish Legal Awards 2017:

- Litigation Team of the Year - Short-listed.

The Lawyer Awards 2015:

- Competition Team of the Year - Short-listed.

== Legal 500 ==
The firm at the time of its merger was ranked as 'regional heavyweight' in Scotland by independent directory Legal 500, and was listed Tier 1 and Tier 2 as follows:

Practice Area	Tier	Office
Banking and Finance	Tier 1	Edinburgh & Aberdeen
Commercial Litigation	Tier 2	Edinburgh & Glasgow
Commercial Property	Tier 1	Edinburgh & Glasgow
Construction	Tier 2	Edinburgh & Glasgow
Corporate Tax	Tier 1	Glasgow
Education	Tier 2	Edinburgh & Glasgow
Energy (Excluding Oil & Gas)	Tier 2	Edinburgh
Environment	Tier 2	Edinburgh & Glasgow
EU & Competition	Tier 1	Glasgow
General Corporate and Commercial	Tier 2	Aberdeen, Edinburgh & Glasgow
Insolvency and Corporate Recovery	Tier 2	Glasgow
Intellectual Property	Tier 2	Edinburgh & Glasgow
IT & Telecoms	Tier 2	Edinburgh & Glasgow
M&A (up to £50m)	Tier 2	London
Oil & Gas	Tier 2	Aberdeen
Property Litigation	Tier 1	Edinburgh
Transport	Tier 2	Edinburgh & Glasgow
Unit Trusts, OEICS and Investment Trusts	Tier 2	Edinburgh
