= Sylvia Murray =

Scottish suffragette (1875–1955)

Sylvia Winthrope Murray (19 August 1875 – 17 January 1955) was a suffragette, the sister of suffragette Eunice Guthrie Murray.

== Life ==
Murray was born in Cardross, one of four children of suffragist Frances and David Murray who was a solicitor. She studied for a BA at Girton College, spent some time as a missionary, and worked in her father's law firm.

She was a friend of Chrystal MacMillan with whom she corresponded, a member of the Women's Freedom League with her mother Frances and her sister Eunice, and a member of the National Union of Women's Suffrage Societies.

She was the author of the 1933 book David Murray: A Bibliographical Memoir (published by Bennett & Thomson), based on a paper which she presented in 1932 to the Glasgow Bibliographical Society about her father's library, which was donated after his death to the University of Glasgow.

== See also ==
- Eunice Murray - her sister
- Francis Murray - her mother
