= Partick Cross =

Road junction in Partick, Glasgow, Scotland

Coordinates: 55°52′13.8″N 4°17′58.3″W

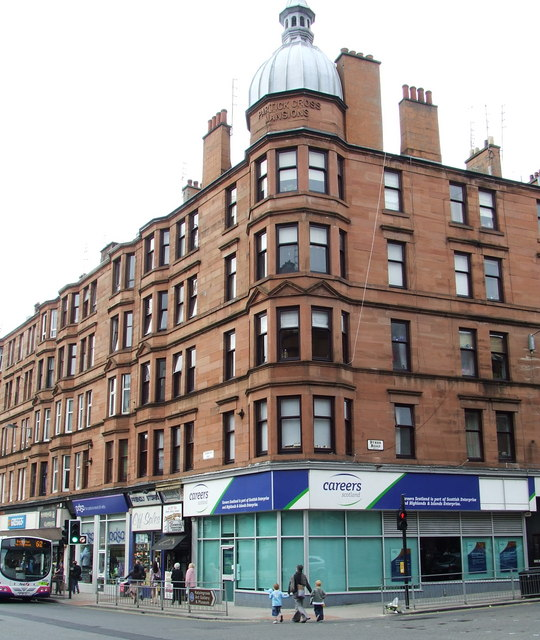
Partick Cross Mansions.

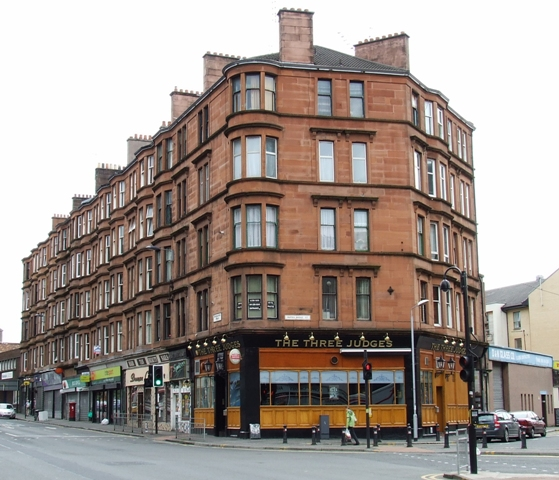
Tenements at Partick Cross.

Partick Cross is a major road junction in Partick, in the west end of the city of Glasgow, Scotland. The junction is the meeting point of Dumbarton Road, Byres Road, Partick Bridge Street and Coopers Well Street.

== History ==
Riots took place on the centenary of Daniel O'Connell's birth on 6 August 1875. The Irish immigrants decided to celebrate with a march and the locals rose up in protest. The centre of what was said to be a major civil disturbance was at Partick Cross. Thirty locals had to be sworn in as special constables including Rachel Hamilton and they drove the rioters back.

== Description ==
Near to the Cross are some of the city's best known tourist destinations including:

- The Kelvingrove Art Gallery and Museum
- Kelvingrove Park
- The University of Glasgow

Also nearby, in an alleyway off Dumbarton Road, is the Kelvinhall subway station – previously known as 'Partick Cross' until 1977 when modernisation work took place.
