= Eunice Murray =

Murray, Eunice Guthrie (1878–1960), suffragist and author

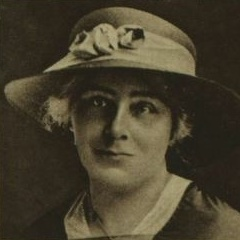
- Eunice Murray in 1922
- Born: 21 January 1878; Cardross, Scotland
- Died: 26 March 1960 (aged 82); Cardross, Scotland
- Occupations: Writer, folklorist
- Known for: The first woman to stand for parliament in Scotland.

Signature
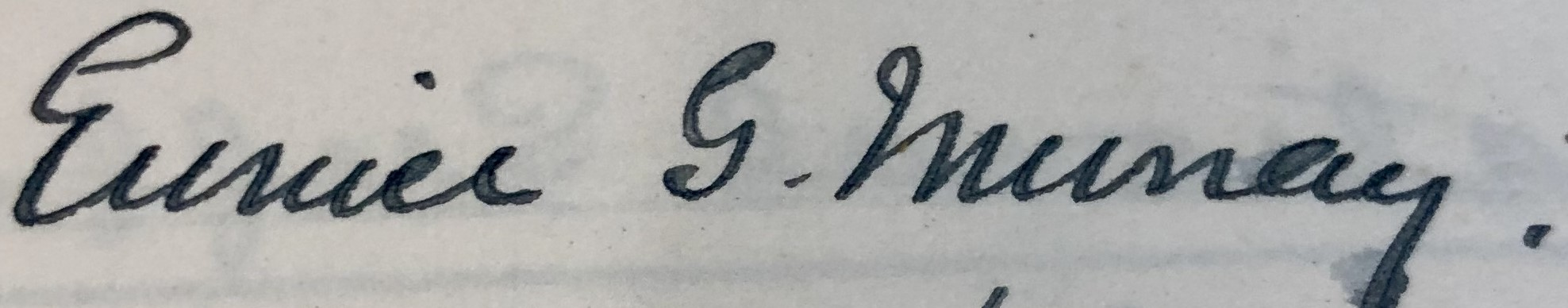

Eunice Guthrie Murray MBE (21 January 1878 – 26 March 1960) was a Scottish suffrage campaigner, author and historian. She was a leading figure in the Women's Freedom League in Scotland. Murray was the only Scottish woman candidate in the first UK general election open to women in 1918.

== Early life ==
Murray was born in Cardross to American born abolitionist parents David Murray and Frances Porter Stoddard. Her father was a leading lawyer and both her parents were supporters of the women's movement. Murray was educated at St Leonards School. While her sisters Dorothy and Sylvia attended university, Eunice did not. She undertook voluntary work, including with the League of Pity, the temperance movement and the settlement movement. She was also a member of the Arbitration and Peace Society during the time of the South African War.

== Women's Suffrage ==
By 1897, Murray was involved with women's suffrage work in her local area, including organising a petition.

In 1908, she joined the Women's Freedom League, and was soon appointed its secretary for the whole of Scotland outside the major cities. She became its leading figure in Glasgow, and was president of its Scottish Council in 1913. She was reportedly a strong public speaker, and also wrote numerous pamphlets in support of the vote for the Women's Freedom League. She opposed the undemocratic nature of the Women's Social and Political Union and so did not become involved with it. However she was arrested in November 1913 for addressing a crowd outside Downing Street after she had attended the International Woman Suffrage Alliance conference in Budapest. Murray did not blame the suffragettes for being militant as she decided that the government was the instigator of their behaviour.

The Women's Freedom League continued to campaign for the vote during the First World War, as well as undertaking aid work. The organisation set up a Women's Suffrage National Aid Corps to help women in financial difficulties due to the war, and Murray was on the executive committee. Murray chaired the September 1917 Scottish Council of Women's Freedom League (for Edinburgh, Dundee, Paisley, Dunfermline and (so-called) Scottish Scattered branches) to review their peaceful Clyde Campaign, and to discuss future policy including a focus on 'social welfare', and a tour of Scotland raising awareness of the coming 'Representation of the People' Bill. During the war, Murray also worked at William Beardmore and Company munitions factory and on confidential business, and found time to write her novel, The Hidden Tragedy.

In April 1918, Murray was the 'commemoration orator' at the event to plant the Suffrage Oak in Kelvingrove Park in Glasgow, which celebrated the granting of the vote to some women. Murray continued to be involved with the Women's Freedom League into the 1930s. In 1938, she was the chair of a conference on the Status of Women.

== Political career ==
Murray stood in Glasgow Bridgeton as an independent candidate at the 1918 general election, the only woman to stand in Scotland at the election, although she did not come close to winning the seat.

In 1919, she wrote a pamphlet published by the Voters’ Council, a non party political group set up to ensure new women voters were properly represented in parliament. Entitled “Why I Stand for Parliament”, Murray wrote that there were women who were interested in being elected to the House of Commons, and that parliament would not be truly representative until this began.

In around 1919-1923 she was elected to Dunbartonshire Country Council, where she worked on topics including women's equality, education, housing and health.

== Later life ==
After the war, Murray wrote a memoir of her mother, Frances Murray, a Memoir in 1920, Scottish Women of Bygone Days in 1930 and A Gallery of Scottish Women in 1935. Scottish Women of Bygone Days is notable as an early example of a social history approach to Scottish history, when much of the research at the time focused on political history. She became interested in folklore and wrote Scottish Homespun which was illustrated with pictures of dolls dressed in the outfits she was discussing. Murray made many of these outfits. She campaigned for the creation of a Scottish folk museum.

She donated money to the National Trust for Scotland and served on its committee after 1931. Murray was awarded an MBE in 1945. She never married and died in her family home in Cardross.

== Selected works ==
- Articles on the history of women's suffrage in the Glasgow Forward newspaper (1908).
- Pamphlets, including: 'The Power of Women in the Church', 'Women's Place in the Early Church', 'Women and the Church', 'Women in the Ministry', 'The Illogical Sex', 'Prejudices Old and New' (1913), 'Liberal Cant' (1914), 'Woman - The New Discovery' (1916), 'Women's Value in Wartime' (1917).
- The Hidden Tragedy (1917)
- Frances Murray, a Memoir by her Daughter (1920)
- Scottish Women of Bygone Days (1930)
- A Gallery of Scottish Women (1935)

== See also ==
- Frances Murray (suffragist) – her mother
- Sylvia Murray – her sister
