= Hillhead =

Coordinates: 55.874874°N 4.287201°W

Hillhead: Scottish Gaelic: Ceann a' Chnuic; Scots: Hullheid
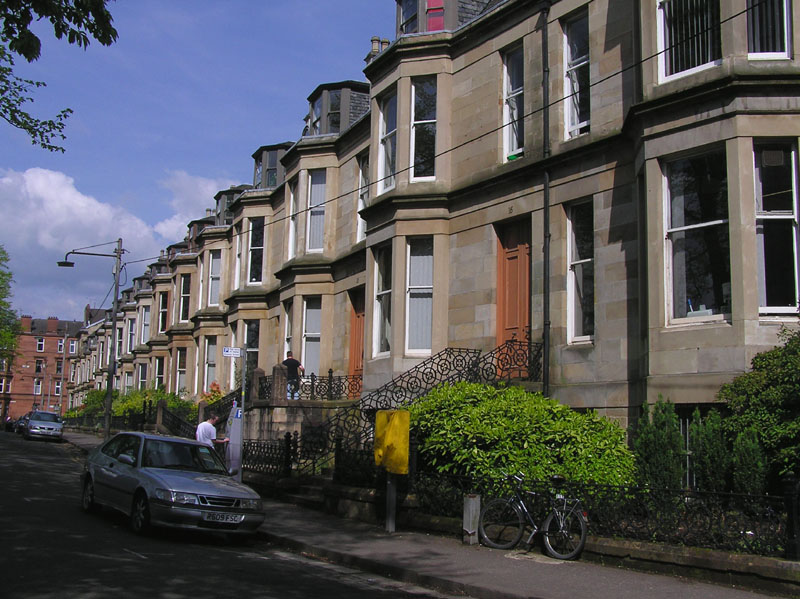
- Lilybank Gardens, a typical Hillhead terrace

- Location within Glasgow
- Area: 0.96 km^{2} (0.37 sq mi)
- Population: 24,649 (2016)
  - Density: 25,676/km^{2} (66,500/sq mi)
- OS grid reference: NS570670
- Council area: Glasgow City Council
- Lieutenancy area: Glasgow
- Country: Scotland
- Sovereign state: United Kingdom
- Post town: GLASGOW
- Postcode district: G12
- Dialling code: 0141
- Police: Scotland
- Fire: Scottish
- Ambulance: Scottish
- UK Parliament: Glasgow North
- Scottish Parliament: Glasgow Kelvin

Hillhead (Scots: Hullheid, Scottish Gaelic: Ceann a' Chnuic) is an area of Glasgow, Scotland. Situated north of Kelvingrove Park and to the south of the River Kelvin, Hillhead is at the heart of Glasgow's fashionable West End, with Byres Road forming the western border of the area, the other boundaries being Dumbarton Road to the south and the River Kelvin to the east and north.

== History ==
Hillhead was an independent police burgh from 1869, but as Glasgow grew during the nineteenth century it was first swallowed up physically by the growing city, and then administratively in 1891.

== Landmarks ==
The University of Glasgow is located in the area, having moved from its original site on the High Street to its current Gilmorehill location in 1870. Consequently a great number of students live in the area. Many academics from the University live in the area along with BBC Scotland employees, actors, broadcasters, writers and many students from various universities and teaching hospitals, creating an economically and culturally diverse community.

Other features of Hillhead include Ashton Lane, Western Baths, Hillhead High School, Glasgow Academy (a private school), and the Kelvinbridge, which straddles the River Kelvin which used to form an eastern boundary between Hillhead and Glasgow, until Hillhead's incorporation into the city.

== Transport ==
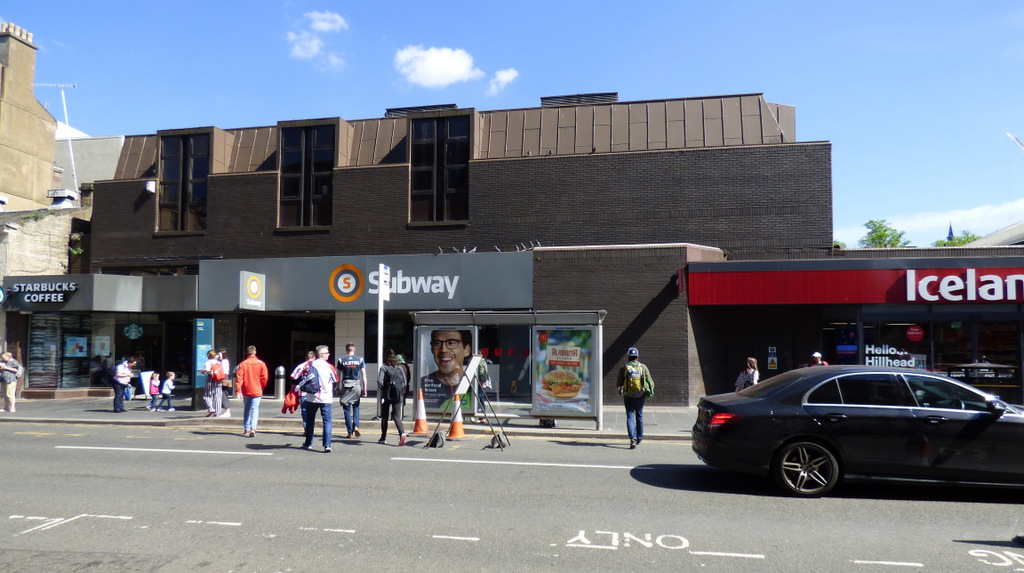
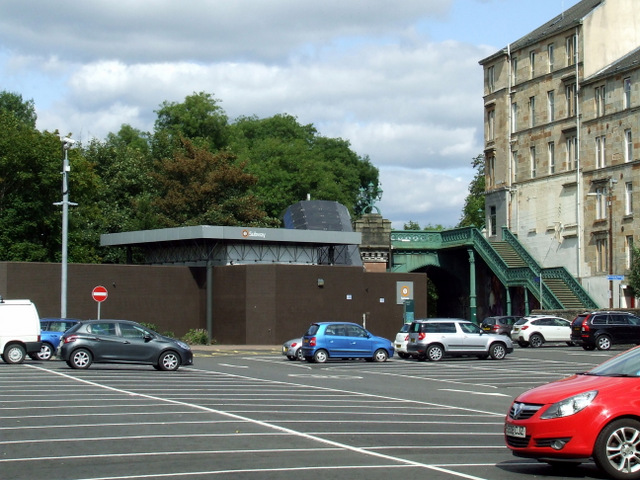
Subway Stations in the area

The area is served by Hillhead subway station and Kelvinbridge subway station on the Glasgow Subway system. The two stops on either side of those are Kelvinhall in Partick, and St George's Cross in Woodlands.

== Churches ==
The neoclassical colonnaded Wellington Church is located on University Avenue, directly opposite the University. The church is a Category A listed building.

== Archives ==
The archives about Hillhead are maintained by the Archives of the University of Glasgow (GUAS).

== See also ==
- Hillhead Jordanhill RFC
