= Kelvinbridge subway station =

Glasgow subway station

Kelvinbridge Drochaid Cheilbhinn
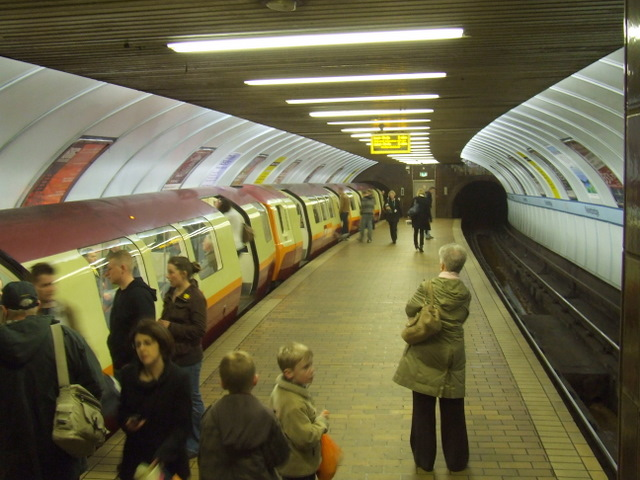

General information
- Location: 99 South Woodside Road; Kelvinbridge, Glasgow, G4 9HG; Scotland
- Coordinates: 55°52′27″N 4°16′50″W
- Operator: SPT
- Transit authority: SPT
- Platforms: 2 (island platform)
- Tracks: 2

Construction
- Structure type: Underground
- Parking: Yes
- Cycle facilities: Yes (bike shed and bike hire)
- Accessible: No

Other information
- Fare zone: 1

History
- Opened: 14 December 1896
- Rebuilt: 16 April 1980; 46 years ago

Passengers
- 2018: ▲1.039 million
- 2019: ▲1.060 million
- 2020: ▼0.390 million
- 2021: ▲0.490 million
- 2022: ▲0.882 million

Services
Preceding station	SPT	Following station
Hillhead anticlockwise / inner circle	Glasgow Subway	St George's Cross clockwise / outer circle
Location
Notes
- Passenger statistics provided are gate entries only. Information on gate exits for patronage is incomplete, and thus not included.

Kelvinbridge subway station (Scottish Gaelic: Drochaid Cheilbhinn) is a Glasgow Subway station serving the Woodlands, Woodside and Hillhead areas of Glasgow, Scotland. It is named after the bridge crossing the River Kelvin, next to the station. This station is one of the two serving Kelvingrove Park, the other being Kelvinhall.

The station – along with the rest of the Subway system – was opened in 1896 and closed for refurbishment in 1977, reopening in 1980. It retains the original island platform layout, and is by far the busiest station to retain this configuration.

The station has a car park, built on the site of the goods yard at Kelvinbridge on the Stobcross to Maryhill Central line.

The station is the deepest station on the Subway due to its close proximity to the River Kelvin - and as such the tunnels are prone to seepage in this area, necessitating pumping systems which run continuously to keep the station dry. It was originally entered through a tenement block on South Woodside Road with access to Great Western Road via an external cast iron staircase descending from the eponymous bridge. Following modernisation, a purpose-built surface-level ticket hall has offered direct access to the new main entrance on Great Western Road via a glass-enclosed escalator.

The former station entrance is now the emergency exit from today's station, the emergency exit being marked by red doors at the bottom of the iron staircase, and "keep clear" signs.

== Past passenger numbers ==
- 2011/12: 0.913 million annually
