= Curlers Rest =

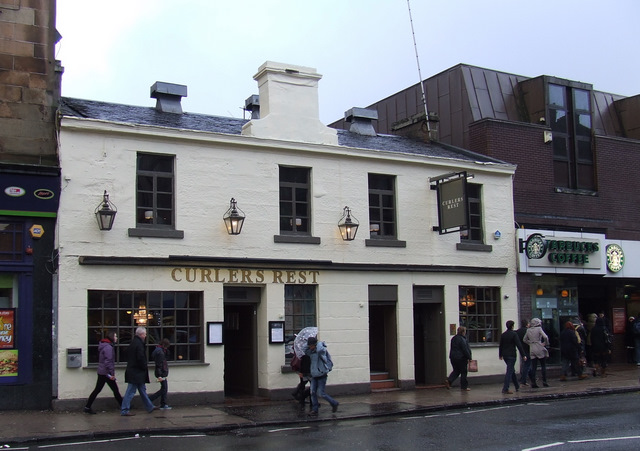
- Interactive map of the Curlers Rest area
- Former names: Curlers Tavern

General information
- Type: Public house
- Location: Byres Road, Glasgow, Scotland
- Coordinates: 55.8754°N 4.2933°W

Technical details
- Floor count: 2

Website
- www.thecurlersrestglasgow.co.uk

The Curlers Rest, formerly the Curlers Tavern, is the oldest drinking establishment on Byres Road, Glasgow, Scotland.

A tavern is said to have been situated at this site since the 17th century, when this part of the city was still countryside. The rural connection is today only remembered in the name Byres Road, from the lands known as the Byres of Partick. The present pub is housed in an 18th-century two-story cottage-type building and derives its name from the large pond, which could be found nearby.

Every winter curlers came to play on the ice. Furthermore, the Partick Curling Club (established in 1842) had its pond here in 1848. There is also a legend associated with the pub which claims that King Charles II came riding one cold winter’s day towards Glasgow on what was then a lonely highway and "spotting the inviting hostelry called a halt for refreshments. Finding it shuttered and barred, the landlord was quickly rousted out and told to open up in the name of the King which he did with the satisfaction that "the Merry Monarch bestowed upon the inn the right, by Royal Charter, to be open day and night, Sundays included, in perpetuity".

At the front of the building there are three doors. In the past there were three bars here, the door on the left leading through the lounge bar, the door on the right to the small snug, and the door in the middle leading upstairs to the hall space/banqueting area above.

From 1999 till June 2010 the pub was a Scream pub geared firmly towards students. It was then refurbished and rebranded as the Curler's Rest.
