= Rachel Hamilton =

19th-century woman special constable

Big Rachel
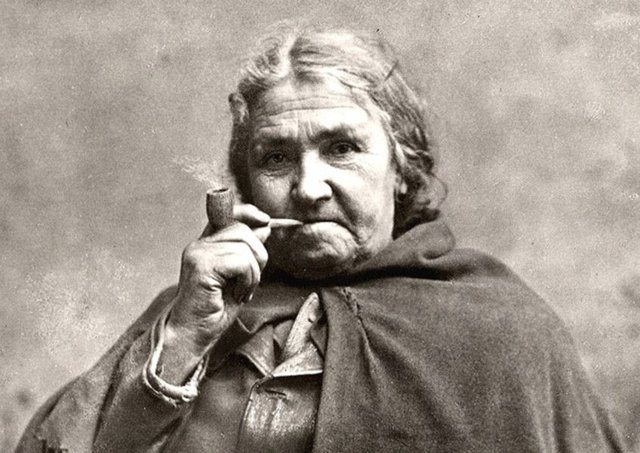
- Born: Rachel Molly Johnston; 1829; Ireland
- Died: 1899 (aged 69–70)
- Other name: Rachel Molly Hamilton
- Occupations: labourer and navvy
- Known for: special constable during the Partick Riots

Rachel Molly Hamilton, also known as Big Rachel, (1829–1899) was an Irish-born woman who was a special constable during the Partick Riots in Glasgow in 1875.

== Early life ==
Hamilton was born in Ireland, later living in Partick, Glasgow in Scotland with her husband. She was 6 ft 4 in (1.93 m) tall and weighed around 17 st (240 lb; 110 kg), and became known as 'Big Rachel'. She held a variety of jobs considered unusual for women at the time, including working as a labourer in Tod and Macgregor's shipyard, as a forewoman navvy in the brickworks at Jordanhill, and as a farm labourer.

== The Partick riots ==
The Partick riots started on 6 August 1875, the centenary of Daniel O'Connell's birth, and lasted for three days. The Irish immigrants decided to celebrate O'Connell's birth with a march and other Glaswegians rose up in protest. Partick's population expanded by over 50% during the 1870s, from 17,700 to 27,400. The centre of what was said to be a major civil disturbance was at Partick Cross. Partick was responsible for its own policing as a police burgh. Hamilton was one of around 30 locals sworn in as special constables, who were responsible for driving the rioters back.

== Commemorating Hamilton ==
Her story is now included as part of a walking tour run by Glasgow Women's Library that highlights notable local women. The tour company "Gallus Pedals" has named a bicycle after her as one of ten Glasgow women "Trailblazers" in various categories.

Hamilton is in the category "Women who Shaped Glasgow's Social Change"
