= Frances Murray (suffragist) =

Frances Porter Murray
- Born: 23 February 1843; New York, United States
- Died: 3 April 1919; Cardross, Scotland
- Notable work: Suffragette and women's education campaigner
- Spouse: David Murray

Frances Porter Murray (née Stoddard, 23 February 1843 – 3 April 1919) was a suffragist raised in Scotland, an advocate of women's education, a lecturer in Scottish music and a writer.

== Early life and family ==
Frances Murray was born in New York, USA in 1843 to Arthur Stoddard and Frances Stoddard, both of whom were active abolitionists. The family emigrated to Glasgow in 1844. In 1853, the Stoddard's moved to Elderslie, Renfrewshire, where Arthur Stoddard went on to establish carpet maker, Stoddard International.

Frances was largely homeschooled, though attended a finishing school in London in 1861. She first engaged with the women's rights campaign while visiting relatives in the USA in 1867-8, where she and her sister met Harriet Beecher Stowe.

In 1872, Frances married David Murray, a prominent Glasgow lawyer. This had followed a lengthy courting period, attributed in large part to the value she placed on her own independence. In a letter to her mother in 1867, she wrote:

"Indeed, here as at home, I find a woman better not have too decided views on any matter, literature, historical, social, reform or politics, if she wishes to be a man's favourite. It is hard that brains in a woman except to give herself satisfaction, are a hindrance not an asset. Well, Mamma dear, I would rather have the brains than live on empty compliments the plaything of any man."

The couple moved to Cardross shortly afterwards and had three daughters: Sylvia Winthrop Murray (19 August 1875 – 17 January 1955); Eunice Guthrie Murray (21 January 1878 – 26 March 1960) and Dorothy; and one son, Anthony Stoddard Murray (16 March 1880 – 23 March 1918).

== Career ==
Murray expressed her desire to enter employment at an early age, but was restricted from doing so because of her gender. In her own words:

"In my young days the aim of a mother was to make her daughter pretty and attractive and sufficiently accomplished to let her marry well. Few other careers presented themselves to women."

Despite this, Murray did manage to deliver public lectures on Scottish music and organise concerts in her hometown of Cardross.

She also authored books in variety genres, including in travel and poetry.

== Campaign for women's education ==
Frances and David Murray shared an interest in various aspects of women's rights and were supporters of the Glasgow Association for the Higher Education of Women. Frances attended many lectures at the University of Glasgow and also delivered some on Scottish song and tradition.

She wrote about how far women's rights had improved in her lifetime in terms of education:

"The Victorian Era burst through this bondage, and now we have schools and colleges for girls and women".

== Political involvement ==
Murray is quoted in her daughter's memoir as saying:

"Before I die I look forward to the fulfilment of sex equality".

She and both her daughters were members of the Women's Freedom League. In 1910, Murray attended a suffrage demonstration in Edinburgh where she led one of the processions. She also encouraged her daughters to take up opportunities she was denied as a young woman. In a letter to Eunice, she wrote:

"Go ahead my daughter - you possess on both sides fighting blood."

== Death ==
Murray died in Cardross, Scotland on 3 April 1919. However, she had managed to vote in the 1918 UK election, the first time women could do so.

== See also ==
- Eunice Murray - her daughter
- Sylvia Murray - her daughter
