= Pension regulation =

Pension regulation is a legal term encompassing, the set of laws, rules and authoritative standards governing the pension industry, and the procedures needed to enforce them.

Pension regulation varies widely from one jurisdiction to another - notably due to the persistence of discrepancies in the degree of autonomy and breadth of authority and discretionary power that national and regional pension regulators have at their disposal to enforce efficiently existing laws and regulations, in relation with local judicial practices and varying jurisprudential trends.

Pension regulation seeks to provide the various norms and standards needed to foster market efficiency, consistency, transparency and accountability across the pension industry; it is a key driver of pension funds' risk management.

In Europe, after the 2008 financial crisis, some pension experts such as Anton van Nunen argued that excessive or misplaced regulatory activism can sometimes have negative unintended consequences, notably when it comes to the strict enforcement of asset liability matching in times high market volatility and the systematic use of bonds-based risk metrics across all asset classes.

== Kinds of pensions ==
=== Voluntary or mandatory ===
- Pension is voluntary, when employers are not required to offer a pension, and in case they do it, they have the right to decide about the volume and choose a type of pension.
- Mandatory pension system obliges all citizens to make pension savings.

=== Universal or Means tested ===
- In case of universal pension every citizen gets a pension starting with a certain age.
- Means-tested social pensions are those where eligibility is based on a test of the income of an individual.

=== PAYG or funded ===
- PAYG (pay-as-you-go) is when current contributions paid for current pensions.
- Funded system means that each individual's contributions pay directly for their pension benefits.

=== Defined benefit (DB) or defined contribution (DC) ===
This characteristic defines a party bearing a risk.

- Defined benefit: a person is provided with specified payments after retirement. Costs and risks relates to the provider.
- Defined contribution: employees and employers are allowed to contribute and invest funds over time to save for retirement. In this case payments depend on the financial system performance.
