= David Murray (solicitor, born 1842) =

Scottish lawyer, antiquarian and bibliophile

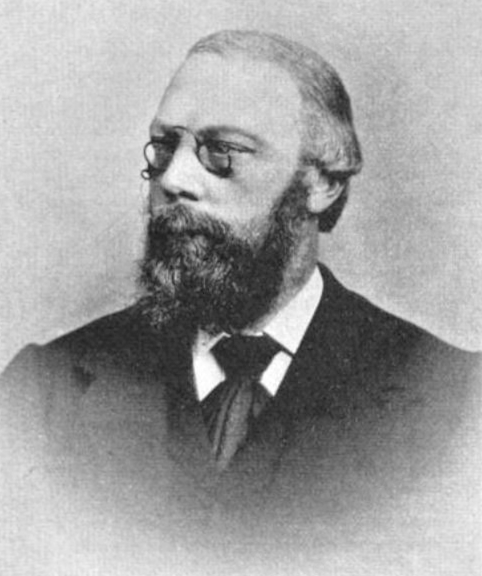
- Born: 15 April 1842; Glasgow, Scotland
- Died: 2 October 1928 (aged 86); Cardross, Argyll, Scotland
- Education: University of Glasgow
- Occupations: Lawyer, antiquarian
- Spouse: Frances Porter Stoddard (m. 1872)
- Children: 4, including Eunice Guthrie Murray

David Murray (15 April 1842 – 2 October 1928) was a Scottish lawyer, antiquarian and bibliophile. A successful solicitor in Glasgow for over 60 years, he wrote widely on the law, and also on archaeology. For the last 30 years of his life he held various offices in the governance of the University of Glasgow.

== Early life and family ==
Murray was born in Glasgow on 15 April 1842, the son of the writer (i.e., solicitor) David Murray, of the firms Murray & Galloway, and Murray & Smith, and Ann Hunter Guthrie.

In 1872, Murray married the New York-born Frances Porter Stoddard. They had three daughters: Sylvia Winthrop Murray (19 August 1875 – 17 January 1955); Eunice Guthrie Murray (21 January 1878 – 26 March 1960) and one son, Anthony Stoddard Murray (16 March 1880 – 23 March 1918). Anthony served during World War I as a Second Lieutenant of the Argyll and Sutherland Highlanders. Anthony died in France of wounds sustained at Saint-Quentin, and was buried in the British cemetery at Bellicourt.

== Education ==
Murray was educated at Kirkoswald (NS2407) in Ayrshire, and then at Ayr Academy and at Merchiston Castle School. He graduated from the University of Glasgow in 1863 with an MA.

== Affiliation to the University of Glasgow ==
Murray was awarded the degree of LLD in 1888 and was active in the governance of the university for much of his life. He was a member of Glasgow University Court, 1896–1899 (Rector's Assessor) and 1903–1928 (General Council Assessor); Chairman of the Finance Committee and a member of Library and Museums Committees. The principal of the university, Sir Hector Hetherington, in his commemoration address on the fifth centenary of the university, at the service held at Glasgow Cathedral on Tuesday, 19 June 1951, expressly recognised Murray's immense contribution to the life of the university. In the Oration Commemorative of the Fifth Centenary, Lord Macmillan referred to Murray as "my old friend" and "one of the University's most devoted alumni". In 1934, Macmillan had dedicated part of an address on "Law and History" to Murray:

May I in passing pay a tribute to the memory of my old friend? Few men in recent times have contributed more to legal learning than did Dr Murray. He demonstrated by his own career the fallacy of the idea that scholarship is inimical to professional success, for while few if any have surpassed him in antiquarian learning, he was no mere pedant but an admirable man of business and the head of one of the most important legal firms in Scotland. I am happy in remembering the stimulus which he gave to my early legal studies and, with no less gratitude, the fact that I received from him my first general retainer – for the old Glasgow and South-Western Railway Company.

Murray's extensive private legal practice permitted him to amass one of the greatest private libraries ever to exist in Scotland. His daughter, Sylvia, estimated that it contained some 40,000 items. Murray left the majority of his library to Glasgow University, where they continue to exist as the Murray Collection, forming about 23,000 items. It was with the materials in his unrivalled library that Murray spent all his leisure hours, resulting in an extensive and wide-ranging scholarly output on law, economic and legal history, accountancy, archaeology, and bibliography. He was President of the Glasgow Archaeological Society (1895–6 and 1904–7) and vice-president of the Society of Antiquaries in Scotland from 1900 to 1902.

The David Murray Book Collecting Prize is open to all currently registered students of the University of Glasgow: "The purpose of the prize is to encourage collecting of books/other printed material – anything with the written word. Applications are based around an annotated list or catalogue of items owned and anticipated future additions, with a separate statement of the concept of the collection."

== Legal career ==
Murray's scholarly and civic achievements are all the more remarkable in the context of his busy professional life. After graduating M.A., Murray turned to law, at first working for his father's old firm. He served his apprenticeship, and became a partner in 1867 (the firm was by then called Smith, Wright & Johnston). In 1869, he and Mr George Smith (of the last-mentioned firm) formed the new company George Smith & Murray, which later (on the death of Mr Smith) became Maclay, Murray and Spens to this day among the best-known law firms in Scotland. He made scholarly contributions to the appropriate designation of law agents or writers in Scotland and was resistant to the adoption of the English chancery designation of "solicitor". He was also Dean of the Royal Faculty of Procurators in Glasgow from 1895 to 1898, whose claim as the oldest professional body of lawyers in Scotland is largely based on his antiquarian researches.

He was one of the leading commercial practitioners of his day. He had particular expertise in the law of property and conveyancing, editing the seven volume standard style book of the day, (with the Professor of Scots Law in the University of Edinburgh, Sir John Rankine KC and the Professor of Conveyancing, John Little Mounsey) and writing much on the history of land registration. Murray considered the Scottish system to be without rival. He firmly believed that the General Register of Sasines was superior to the so-called Torrens system of land registration being promoted elsewhere in the English-speaking world:

Many of the advocates of registration of title have a very imperfect knowledge of the system of registration which exists. The Register of Sasines is treated by them as a mere record of conveyances. That is not so. It is truly far more of a record of title than many of the systems which so describe themselves. The Register is with us the foundation of all titles to land, and more thoroughly protects the rights of owners and creditors than any of the systems which are set against it. It has a flexibility and scope which none of them possess… In England and the Australian colonies, trusts cannot appear on the Register. In Scotland they can, without the slightest inconvenience to anyone, and do appear, with the greatest advantage to all concerned. Registration is the basis of prescription. No burden can be imposed on land, no restriction placed upon its use that does not appear on the Register. In Scotland there can be no secret deeds, no concealed encumbrances which can affect a transfer of land.

Murray had a leading role in the legal aftermath of the collapse of the City of Glasgow Bank. The Directors were indicted for fraud and Murray represented Lewis Potter. Potter received 18 months imprisonment. Murray's involvement in the bank's affairs, however, was most marked by his task of winging up the New Zealand and Australian Land Company, of which Potter had been a director, and which owned 2 million acres of land in Australia and New Zealand.

== Death ==
Murray died on 2 October 1928, aged 86, at his home Moorepark in Cardross. He had been severely ill in 1927, but recovered and returned to work at Maclay, Murray and Spens. However, he fell ill in August on the day after the funeral of his business partner, Mr Spens, and had been confined to his home until his death.

== Select bibliography ==
- The Law Relating to the Property of Married Persons (1891)
- An Archaeological Survey of the United Kingdom (1896)
- Museums: their history and their use: with a bibliography and list of museums in the United Kingdom (3 vols, 1904; reprinted 1996)
- Legal practice in Ayr and the West of Scotland in the Fifteenth and Sixteenth Centuries: A Study in Economic History (1910)
- Lawyers' Merriments (1912)
- Robert & Andrew Foulis and the Glasgow Press (1913)
- Bibliography: Its Scope and Methods (1917)
- Early Burgh Organization in Scotland (2 vols, 1924 and 1932, the second posthumously published)
- Memories of the Old College of Glasgow: some chapters in the history of the University (1927)
- Chapters in the History of Bookkeeping, Accountancy & Commercial Arithmetic (Glasgow: Jackson, Wylie & Co, 1930) 519pp
