= PRS REIT =

British investment trust

- Company type: Public
- Traded as: LSE: PRSR
- Founded: 2017; 9 years ago
- Headquarters: Manchester, England
- Key people: Geeta Nanda (chair)
- Website: www.theprsreit.com

The PRS REIT (LSE: PRSR), is a large British investment trust, operating in the Private Rented Sector (PRS), which is focused on creating a portfolio of family homes for rent. It is the UK's largest portfolio of build to rent single family houses.

== History ==
The company was launched through an initial public offering with financial backing from the Homes and Communities Agency in 2017. Stephen Smith was appointed chair at the time of the launch.

In April 2023, the company confirmed that it had completed 5,000 houses, making it the holder of the UK's largest portfolio of build to rent single family houses.

However, in August 2024, a group of shareholders holding 17.3% of the company, who were concerned about the large discount of share price to net asset value, sought an extraordinary meeting seeking to remove the chair and to instigate a strategic review.

In September 2024, the company announced that Smith would step down and Geeta Nanda would become interim chair in December 2024. As a result of this, the dissenting shareholders withdrew their request for an extraordinary general meeting.

The company sold its property portfolio to Northern LGPS and Local Pensions Partnership Investments for £1.1 billion in December 2025. It subsequently announced that it would seek shareholder approval to proceed to liquidation.

== Operations ==
The company is managed by Sigma PRS, which holds an agreement to manage the portfolio to 2029.
