= Byres Road =

Street in Glasgow, Scotland

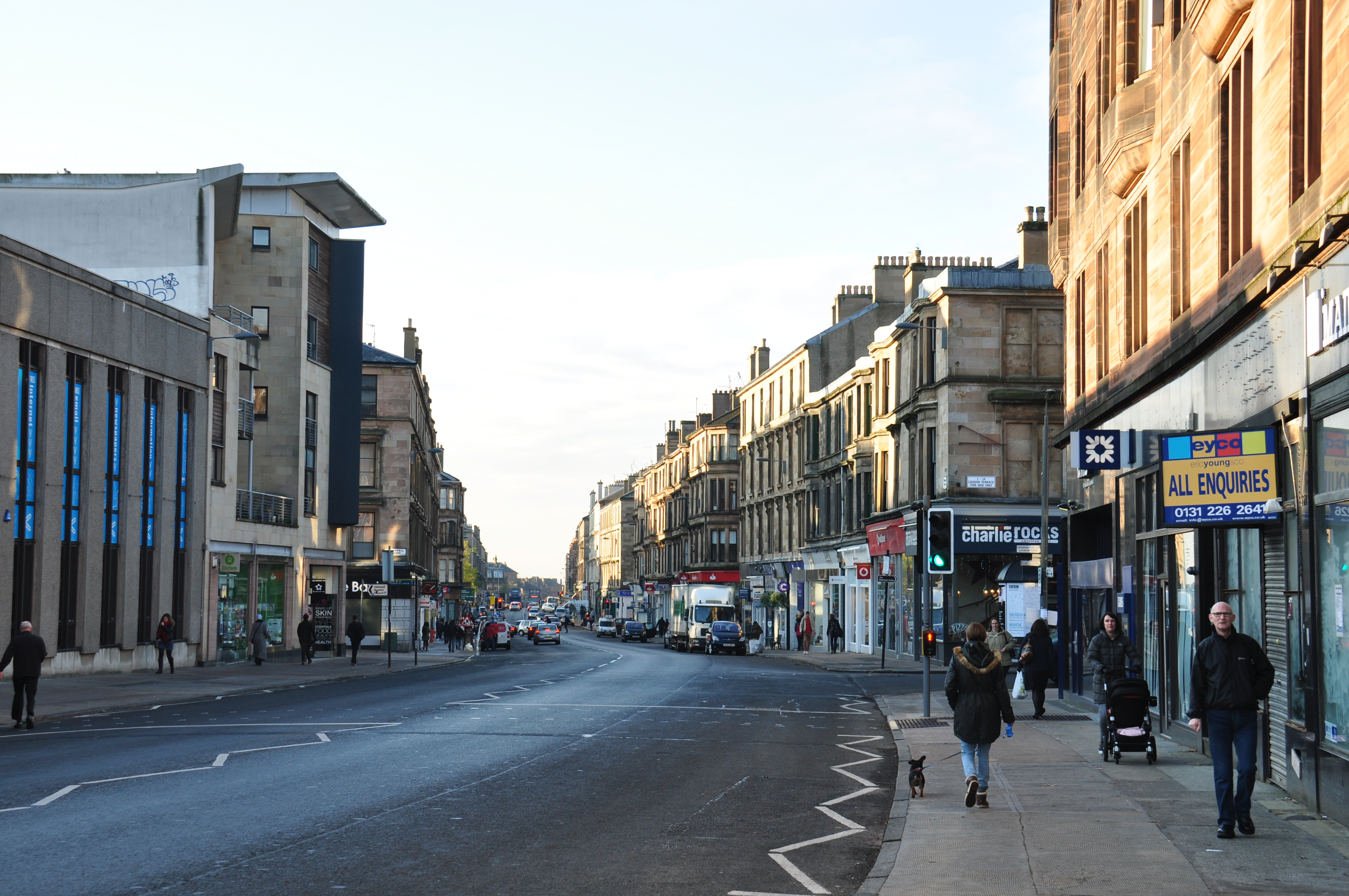
- Former name: Victoria Street
- Part of: B808
- Type: Commercial/Transport
- Maintained by: Glasgow City Council
- Length: 1 km (5/8 mi)
- Location: Glasgow
- Postal code: G12
- Nearest Glasgow Subway station: Hillhead and Kelvinhall
- Coordinates: 55°52′25″N 4°17′42″W

Byres Road is a street in Hillhead, Glasgow, Scotland. It is the central artery of the city's West End.

== Location and history ==
Byres Road is a mixed commercial, shopping and upmarket residential area consisting largely of traditional sandstone tenements with retail premises on the ground floor and three floors of residential flats above. Its proximity to the University of Glasgow has meant that the surrounding West End of Glasgow has a large student population. Murals painted by the notable Glasgow artist Alasdair Gray adorn the Ubiquitous Chip, the Oxfam Bookshop, and the Òran Mór bars.

Stretching from Great Western Road at the Botanic Gardens in the north to Dumbarton Road at Partick Cross in the south, the road originally ran through a relatively rural area called the Byres of Partick (also known as Bishop's Byres). The oldest pub in the area is the 17th century Curler's, originally sited beside a pond used for curling and, legend has it, given a seven-day licence by King Charles II.

During the period when Hillhead and Partick were independent burghs, Byres Road was known by its original name of Victoria Street. By the time Hillhead was annexed by Glasgow on 1 November 1891, there were four different Victoria Streets in the expanded Glasgow area. All these streets were subsequently renamed with Victoria Street, Hillhead, becoming Byres Road. The burgh of Hillhead was created on 14 May 1869 and the Burgh Chambers were established in Victoria Street in 1873, on the site of the present day Hillhead Library.

Nearby lanes and byways have benefited from the business of Byres Road and now contain a variety of small businesses from tapas bars to second-hand record stores. The most famous of these is Ashton Lane, which contains bars, restaurants and a cinema.

== Transport ==
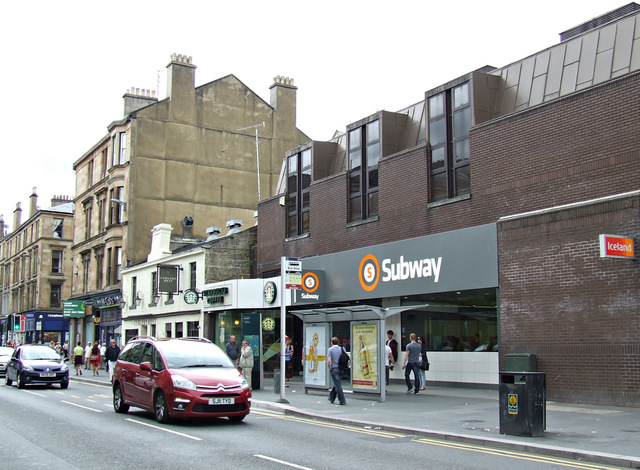
Hillhead subway station

The northern end of Byres Road is served by Hillhead station on the Glasgow Subway, while the southern end is closer to Kelvinhall on Dumbarton Road.
