= Ashton Lane =

Street in Glasgow, Scotland

Coordinates: 55.874757°N 4.292865°W

Ashton Lane is a cobbled backstreet in the West End of Glasgow. It is connected to Byres Road by a short linking lane beside Hillhead subway station and is noted for its bars, restaurants and a licensed cinema.

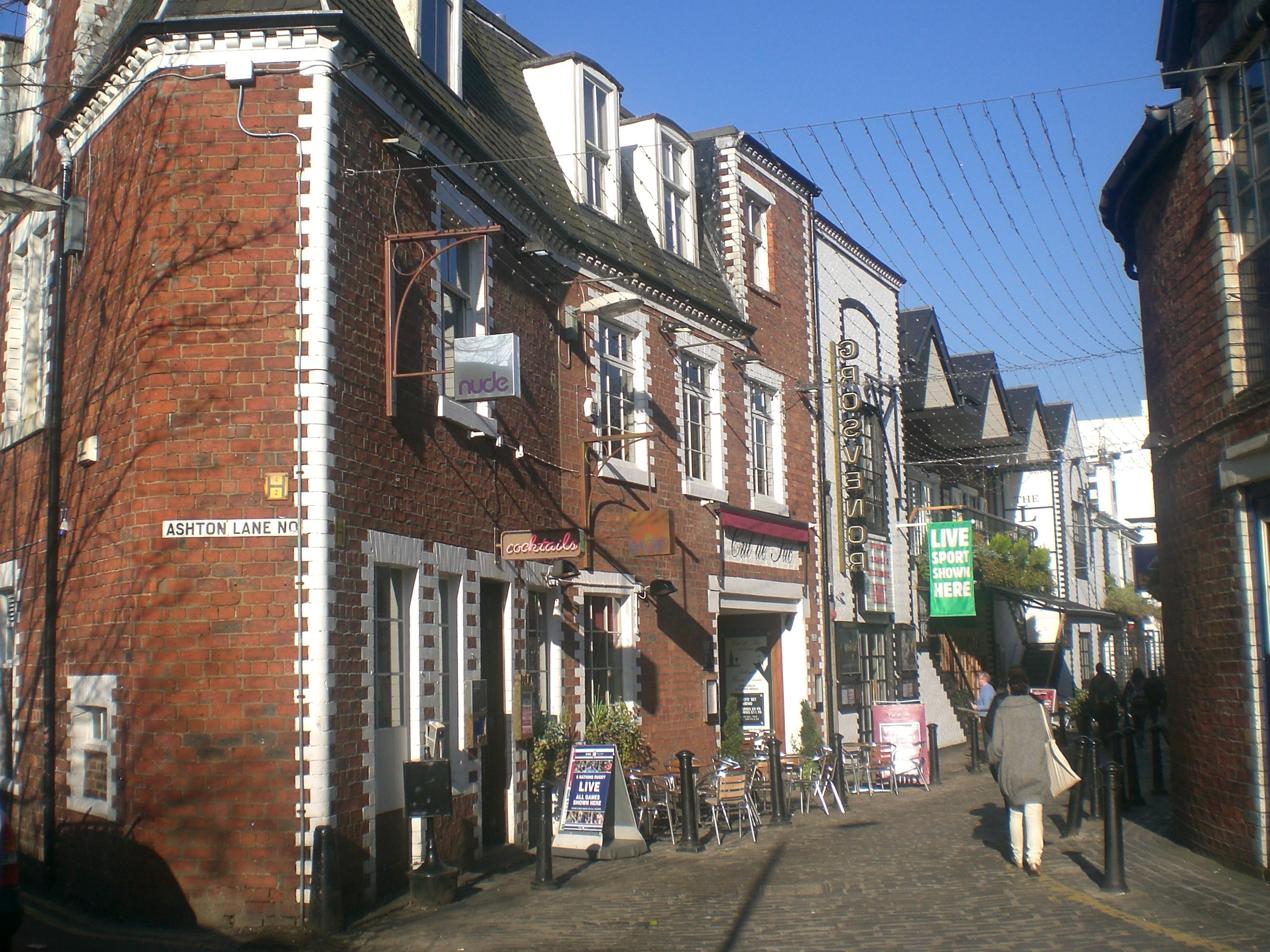
Off the main thoroughfare of Byres Road, Ashton Lane is a focus for bars, cafes and restaurants.

== Overview ==
The Lane was not always the focus of West End cafe society. By the early 1970s, it was a run-down area of small residential and empty commercial properties. However, in 1976, the cost to renew the lease on the cramped property in Ruthven Lane that housed the Ubiquitous Chip restaurant forced the owner to look for new premises. 'The Chip', as it is locally known, moved to its current location in a derelict property that had been the stables for a funeral undertaker. The move was a gamble for the owner, Ronnie Clydesdale, since the Lane was a backwater to the thriving Byres Rd but in 1977 the Glasgow Subway closed for a major refurbishment. This forced several small businesses to relocate from Byres Rd and the then-famous Grosvenor Cafe followed The Chip into Ashton Lane.

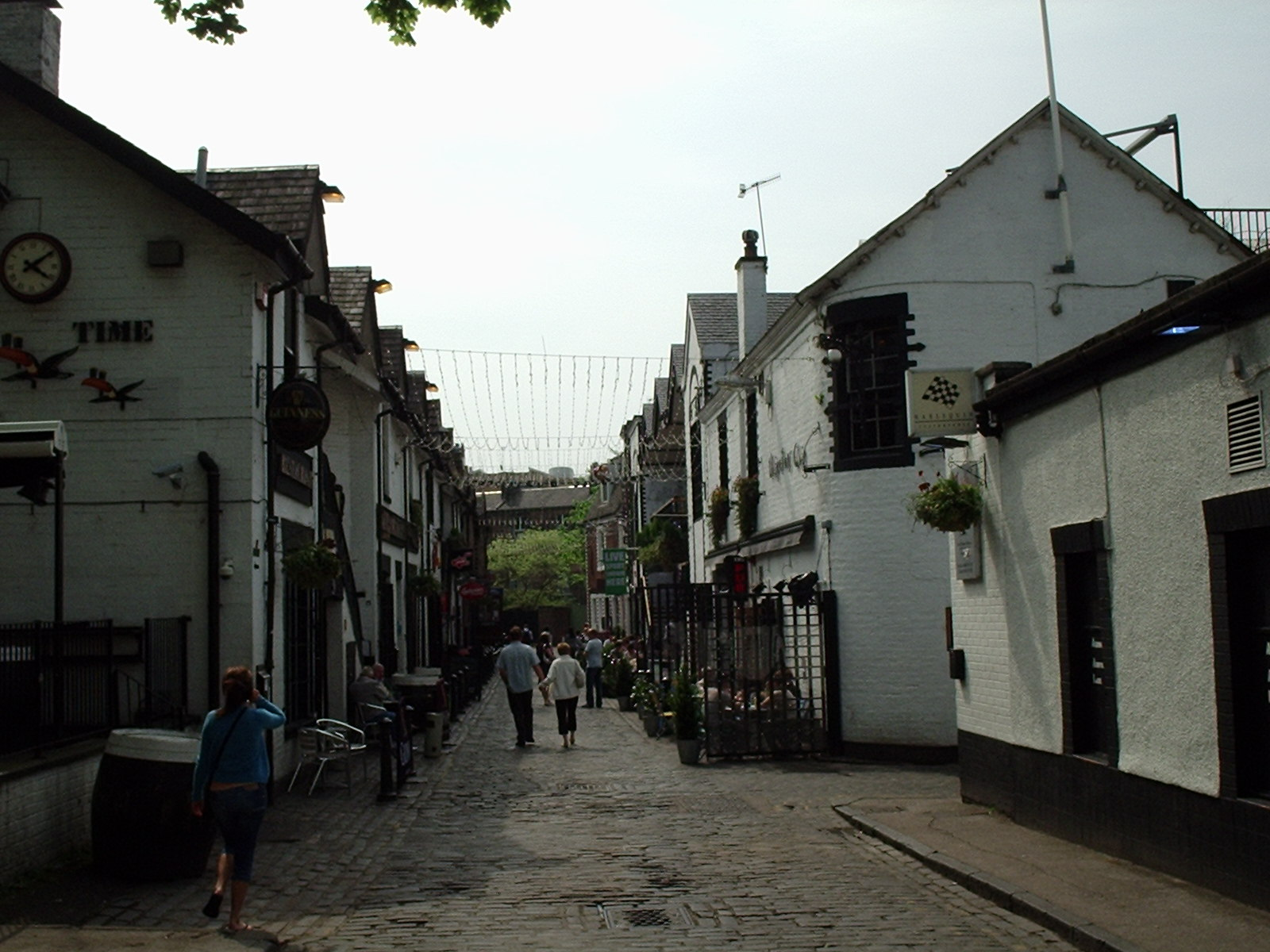
Ashton Lane, looking from Great George Street.

Other bars and restaurants were opened: the Cul-de-Sac creperie in the former Barr and Stroud factory and Bar Brel in the old coachhouse that had been used latterly as a landscape gardener's yard but was, in 1910, the chauffeur's house and garage for Dr Marion Gilchrist's 'prim dark green Wolseley landaulette'. Dr Gilchrist (1864–1952) was, in 1894, the first woman to graduate in medicine in Scotland.

Cresswell Lane, Glasgow.

Today, bars and restaurants occupy most of the premises in Ashton Lane. The Famous Grosvenor Cafe and the now internationally renowned 'Chip' remain a defining feature. Some like Jinty McGuintys Irish Bar have been there a while too, almost 25 years.

Ashton Lane continues north as Cresswell Lane, where the variety of bars and restaurants is supplemented by a gallery of small specialist shops. The Lane and its surroundings might then be regarded as Glasgow's equivalent of Dublin's Temple Bar area or Edinburgh's Rose Street. While still popular with local residents and students, it is now firmly established on the Glasgow tourist trail.

== Grosvenor cinema ==
The Grosvenor Picture Theatre was built on site of Henderson's Cab and Funeral Office in Byres Road and Ashton Lane. The cinema opened on 3 May 1921 with 'Helen of the Four Gates' and 'Eastwards Ho' and the performances were accompanied by the theatre's own orchestra and organist. The building was designed by architects Gardner & Glen and had a distinctive terracotta façade. The original entrance faced Byres Road and the upper level housed a Café and American Soda Fountain and, by 1929, a waiting room.

The original cinema seated around 1,350 people, but in the 1970s it underwent considerable reconstruction. The entrance was moved from Byres Rd to Ashton Lane, and the old entrance became Bonham's Wine Bar (the railing in the original foyer is retained in the upstairs bar). Two screens named the Kelvin and the Ashton were built on the ground floor, with 285 and 276 seats respectively. After falling into disrepair, the cinema closed on 30 June 2002, but was reopened in October 2003 after a multimillion-pound refurbishment. The two screens were refurbished, a bar and restaurant was built in the former neglected roof space and a new cafe/bar was opened on Ashton Lane. The cinema shows a mix of blockbuster and art-house movies.
