= Kelvingrove Park =

Public park in Glasgow, Scotland

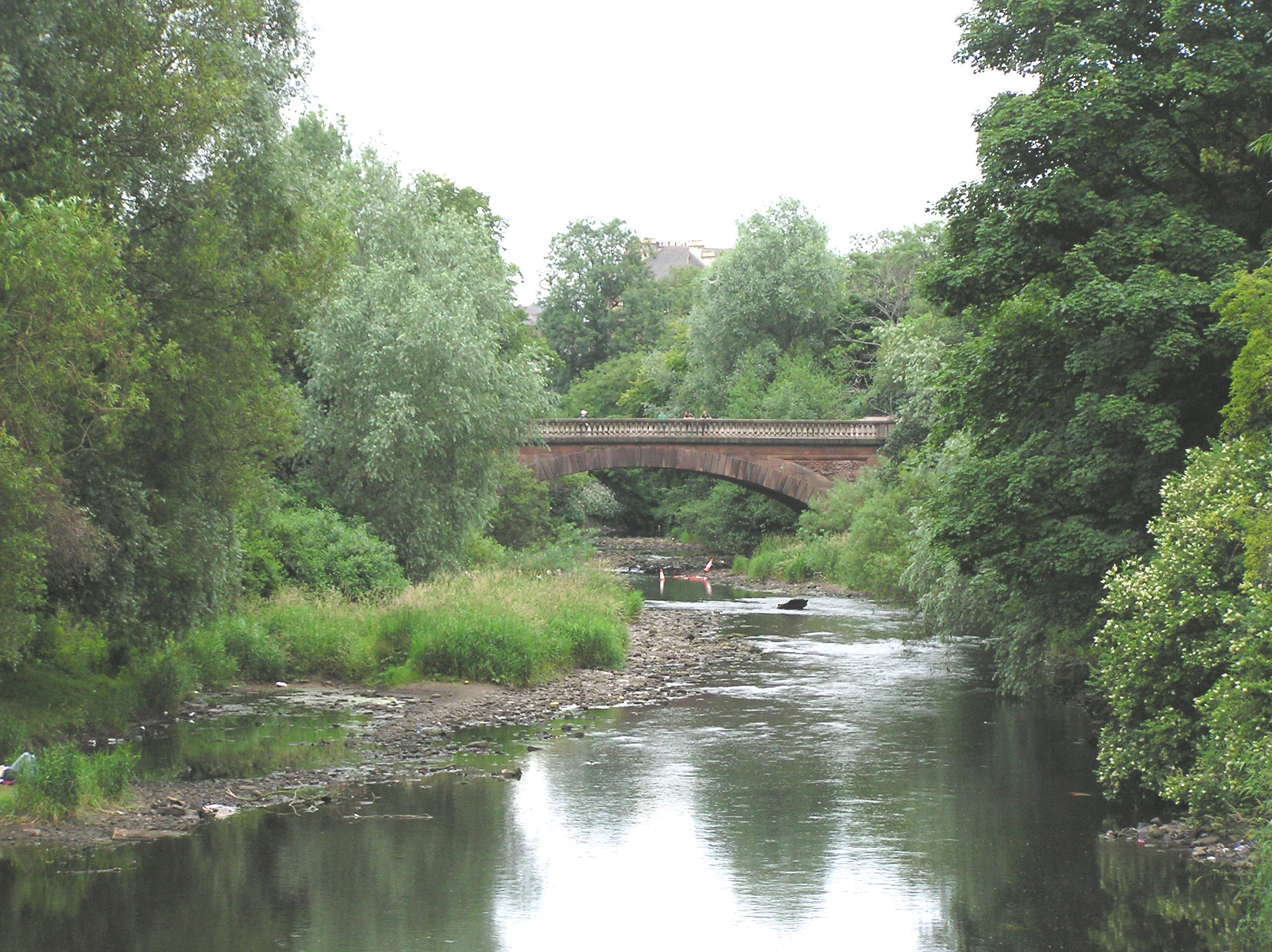
- The River Kelvin passing through the park
- Interactive map of Kelvingrove Park
- Type: Public park
- Location: Glasgow, Scotland
- Coordinates: 55°52′6″N 4°17′11″W
- Area: 34 hectares (84 acres)
- Created: 1852
- Operator: Glasgow City Council
- Status: Open all year
- Public transit: Kelvinbridge subway station

Inventory of Gardens and Designed Landscapes in Scotland
- Official name: Kelvingrove Park
- Designated: 31 March 2006
- Reference no.: GDL00235

Kelvingrove Park is a public park located on the River Kelvin in the West End of the city of Glasgow, Scotland, containing the Kelvingrove Art Gallery and Museum.

== History ==
Kelvingrove Park was originally created as the West End Park in 1852, and was partly designed by Sir Joseph Paxton, Head Gardener at Chatsworth House, whose other works included The Crystal Palace in London, Glasgow Botanic Gardens, and the gardens at Lismore Castle in County Waterford; however, the park was mostly designed by architect Charles Wilson and surveyor Thomas Kyle. The Town Council had purchased the land, which formerly represented parts of the Kelvingrove and Woodlands estates, that year for the sum of £99,569, around £10.9 million as of 2021. The park was intended to provide for the continued expansion of the city to the west, providing relaxation and recreation opportunities for the new middle class to the west, and an escape from the rapid slumming around Glasgow Green.

=== Exhibitions ===
The park has been the site of three exhibitions: the 1888 International Exhibition, the 1901 International Exhibition and the 1911 Scottish Exhibition. Large, impressive buildings were constructed in the park for the International Exhibitions, including a large Indian pavilion where the Art Gallery now stands, and a Russian restaurant building. These, however, have since been demolished. The Doulton Fountain was originally situated in the park for the 1888 Exhibition but was later relocated to Glasgow Green, as was the Saracen Fountain for the 1901 Exhibition which is now in Alexandra Park.

== Location and features ==
The park is 34 hectares (85 acres) in size, and located in the West End of Glasgow. It straddles the River Kelvin shortly before the river's confluence with the Clyde, and as such is an urban haven for wildlife. Birds found in the area include the grey heron, cormorant, kingfisher, mallard and goosander, and other animals include the red fox, brown rat and otters. The park is flanked to the west by Gilmorehill and the University of Glasgow, to the south by Finnieston, Kelvingrove and Yorkhill, to the east by Charing Cross and to the north by Hillhead and Woodlands. This central location makes it a popular route for pedestrians and cyclists commuting to the city centre, leading quickly from the West End to Charing Cross whilst avoiding traffic. The park is also popular with dog-walkers and students from the university.

Kelvingrove sits around the contours of a large hill, on which is sited the Park District in Glasgow. This was formerly a highly desirable residential area before falling out of fashion and being taken over mostly for office space and student accommodation. However, recent high-class developments there have led to much of the neighbourhood returning to residential use. The area is also home to 22 Park Circus, the city's former registry office, and to the Glasgow branch of the Goethe-Institut, a German culture institution.

There are three Glasgow subway stations in the vicinity of the park, Kelvinbridge to the north being the closest via the Kelvin Walkway, with Hillhead to the northwest and Kelvinhall to the west also within walking distance, as are Exhibition Centre and Charing Cross railway stations to the south and south-east respectively. There are frequent buses on various routes using Argyle Street, Sauchiehall Street and Great Western Road which flank the park to the north and south.

=== Monuments ===
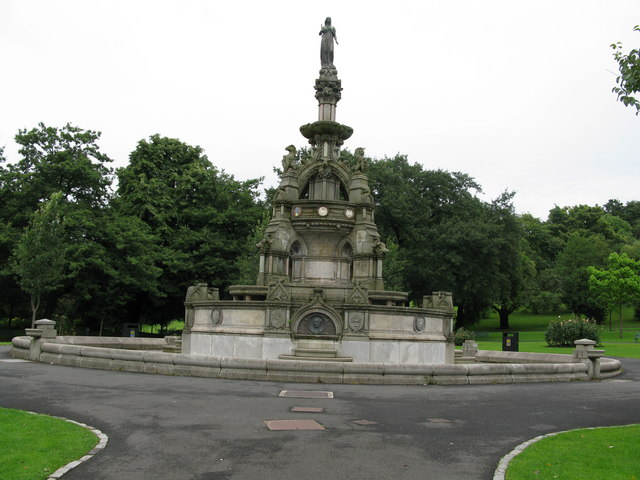
The Stewart Memorial Fountain, celebrating the establishment of the Loch Katrine and Milngavie waterworks

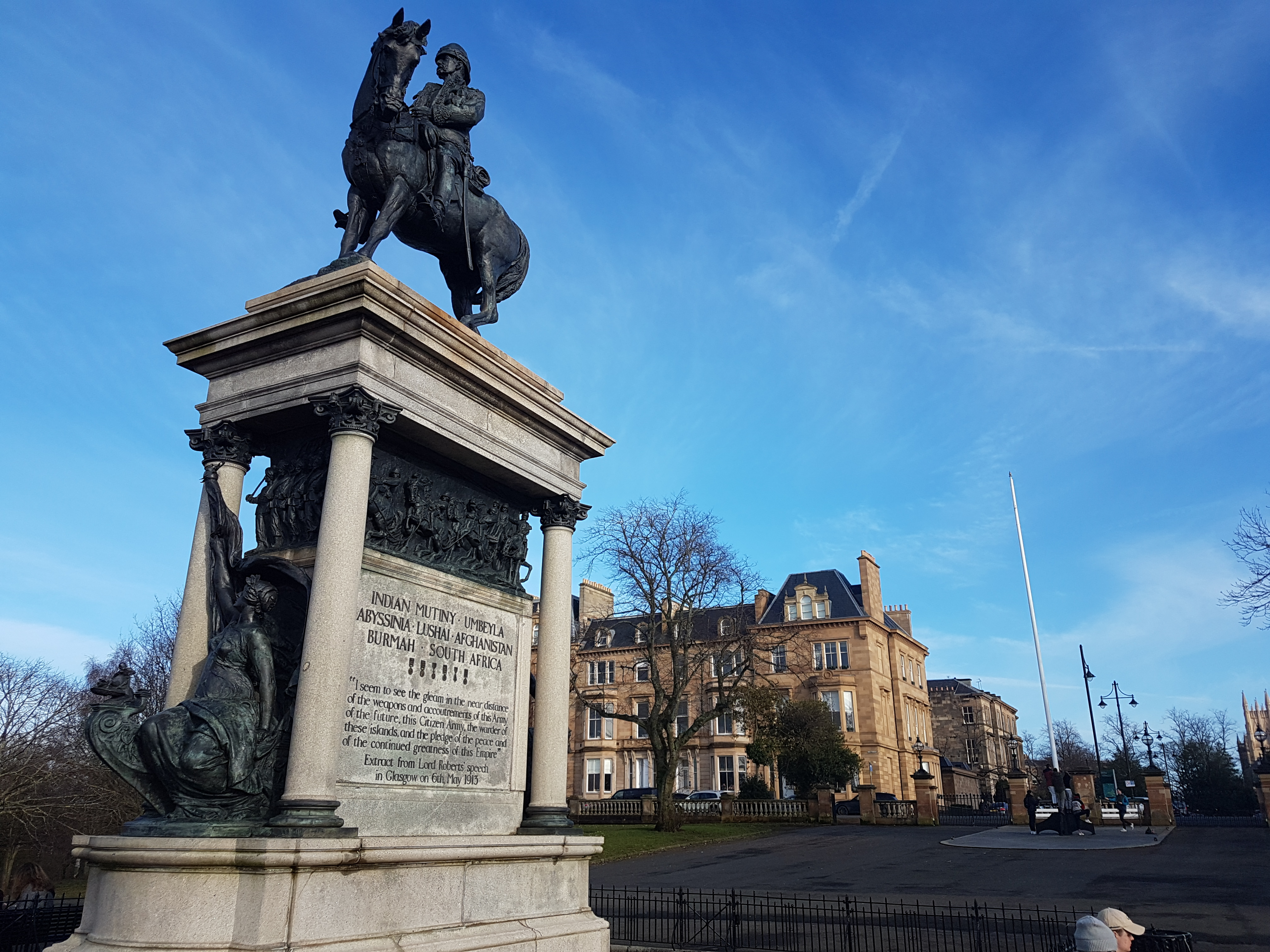
Monument to Field Marshal The 1st Earl Roberts, the Anglo-Irish military commander, at Kelvingrove Park

Kelvingrove contains a bandstand, skatepark, bowling and croquet greens, and various statues and monuments. The largest monument is the Stewart Memorial Fountain, built to commemorate Lord Provost Robert Stewart (1851–1854) and his achievement of providing the city with fresh water from Loch Katrine. The fountain was built in 1872 to a design by James Sellars, who later designed the nearby St. Luke's Orthodox Cathedral and Kelvinside Academy. It is built of granite, sandstone, marble and bronze, features imagery of the Trossachs, and is topped by a figure of Sir Walter Scott's Lady of the Lake.

The park also contains statues of physicist Lord Kelvin, writer Thomas Carlyle, Field Marshal Lord Roberts and chemist Lord Lister, as well as the Cameronians War Memorial and a memorial to the Highland Light Infantry. The park is popular with dog-walkers and joggers, and is convenient for tourists, being adjacent to Kelvin Hall Sports Arena, on the opposite side of Argyle Street. The park also contains the renowned Kelvingrove Art Gallery and Museum.

=== Bandstand ===
The bandstand within the park was built in 1924 and designed by James Miller. It was a popular location for outdoor music until it became neglected and vandalised around 1995. It played host to thousands of events from military bands to old-time Music Hall acts, Glasgow's first-ever Steel Band Festival to the Radio Clyde Rock Concerts. It was also used for charity fundraising concerts such as the 'Woodlands Fun Days for Children' with Yorkhill Hospital's Radio Lollipop between 1993 and 98. Scottish bands and musicians such as Belle & Sebastian, Teenage Fanclub, Franz Ferdinand, Eddi Reader, Carol Laula and Horse have all expressed support for the restoration of Kelvingrove Park's Bandstand. MSP Pauline McNeill also presented a motion to the Scottish Parliament about the bandstand restoration.

In April 2012, the Scottish Parliament provided a £245,000 building repair grant for the restoration of the bandstand. On 7 May 2014, after several months and £2 million of restoration work, it was announced that the Bandstand would host a summer music festival over two weekends in August 2014. Acts announced for the Magners Summer Nights Festival were Steve Earle, The Waterboys, Alison Moyet, Capercaillie, Teenage Fanclub and Squeeze.

=== Flora ===
On 20 April 1918 suffrage organisations planted a sessile oak in the park, now known as the Suffrage Oak, to commemorate women being granted the right to vote earlier that year. In 2015 the tree was named Scottish Tree of the Year by the Woodland Trust after being nominated by Glasgow Women's Library. It was then a nominee for the 2016 European Tree of the Year. The tree was subsequently damaged in 2017, and so Glasgow City Council had to reduce its height.

== In culture ==
- Scottish football club Rangers was formed by the four founder members who met at West End Park (today Kelvingrove Park) in March 1872.
- The Kelvingrove Lawn Bowls Centre was the venue for the Lawn bowls event at the 2014 Commonwealth Games.
- The poet, Lyle, wrote a song about the park, entitled Kelvin Grove.
- Much of Alasdair Gray's novel Poor Things takes place in and around the park.
- English music hall singer Mark Sheridan shot himself here in 1918.
- The Brisbane suburb of Kelvin Grove was named after the park.
- The park and Kelvin Way appear in Louise Welsh's novel, The Cutting Room.
- The park features prominently in the Bill Forsyth film That Sinking Feeling.
- The Bathers, a Scottish band, published their album Kelvingrove Baby in 1997.

== Gallery ==
Kelvingrove Park

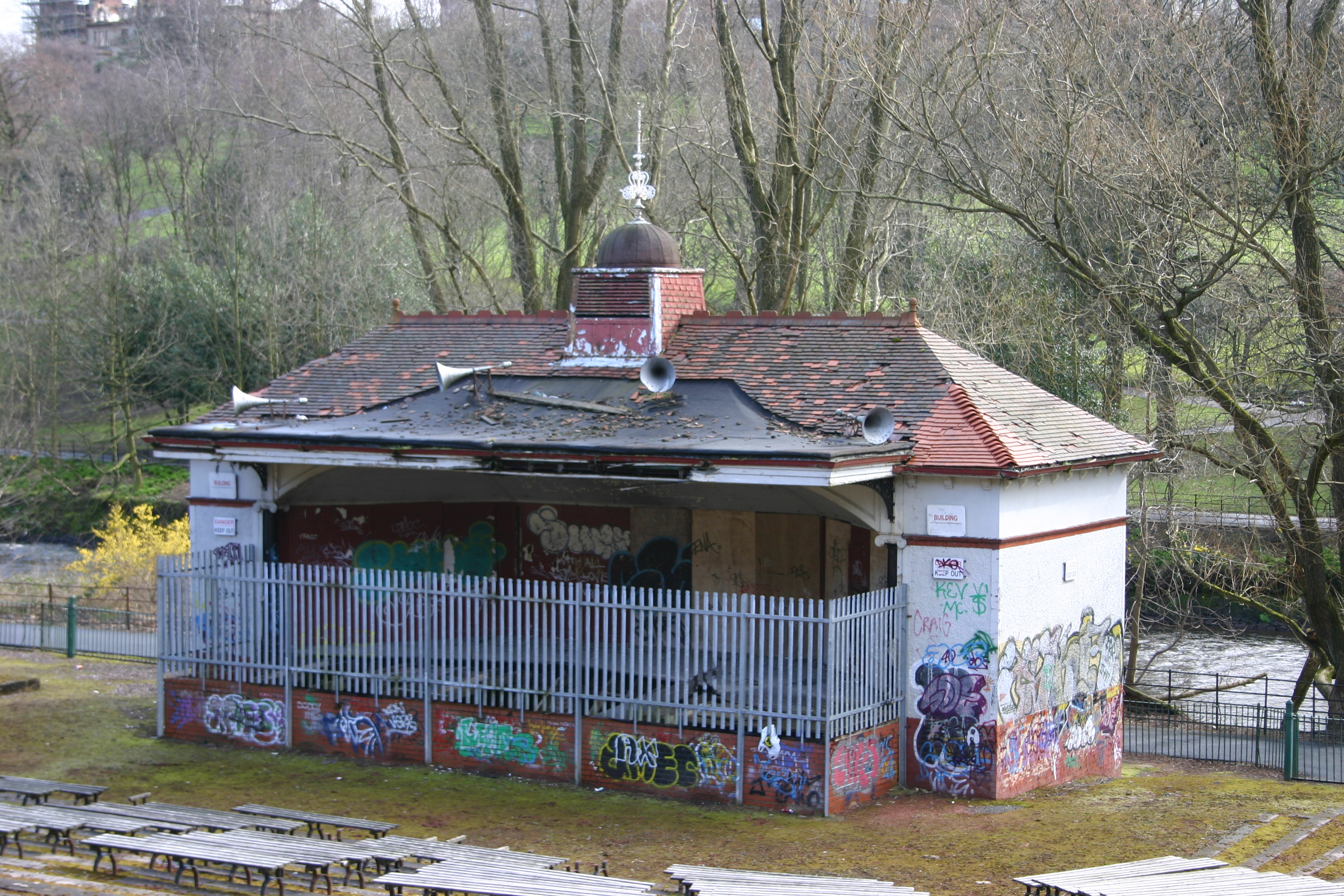
Vandalised bandstand in 2007, before its 2013 restoration.

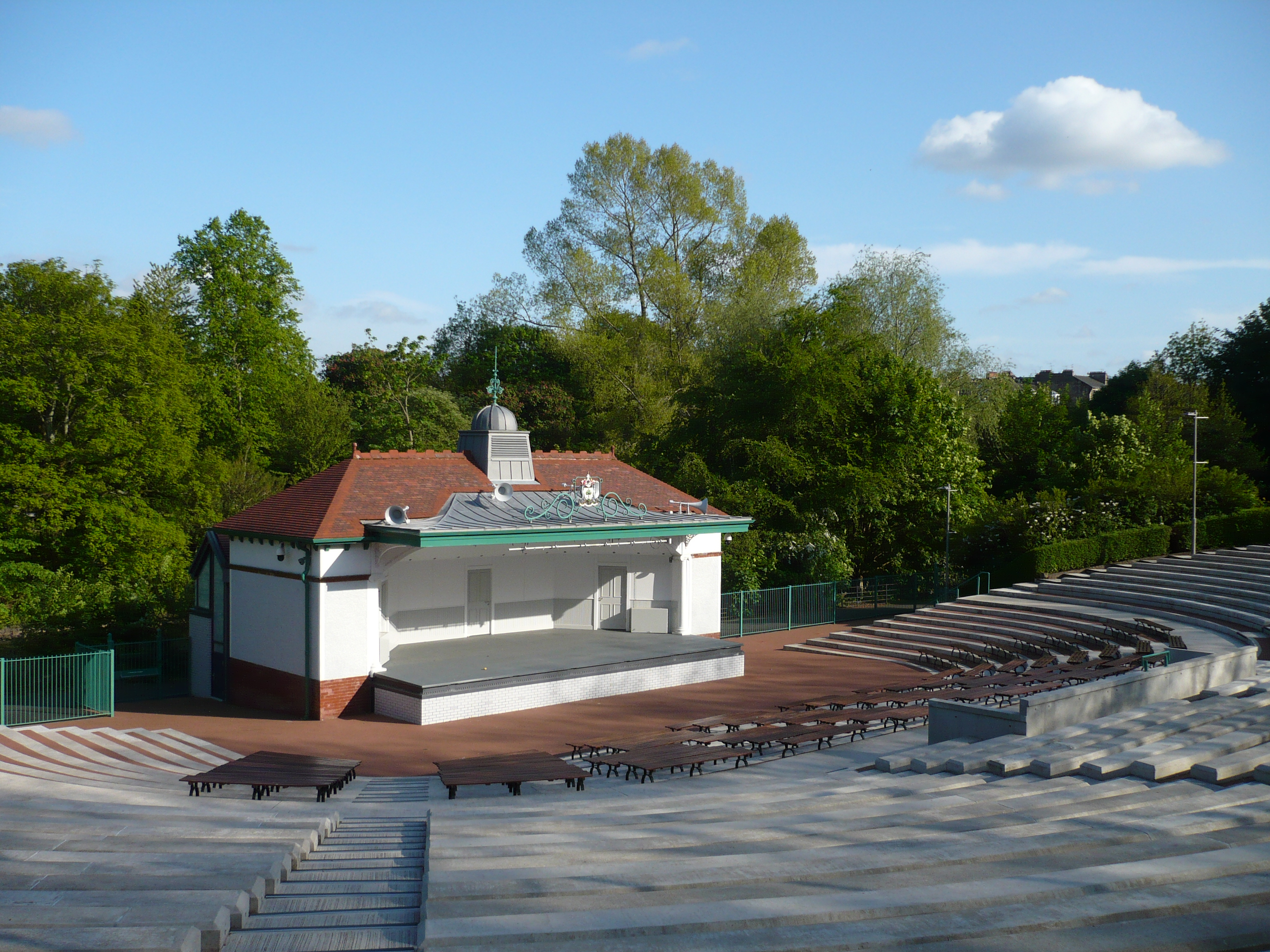
Bandstand after its 2013 refurbishment.

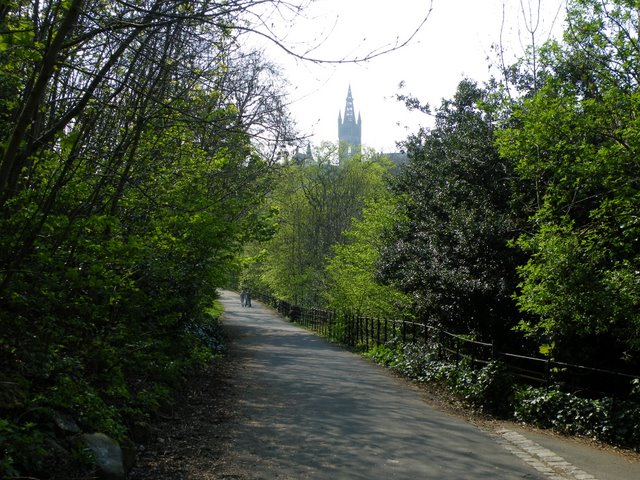
The River Kelvin is to the right, with Glasgow University tower in the distance.

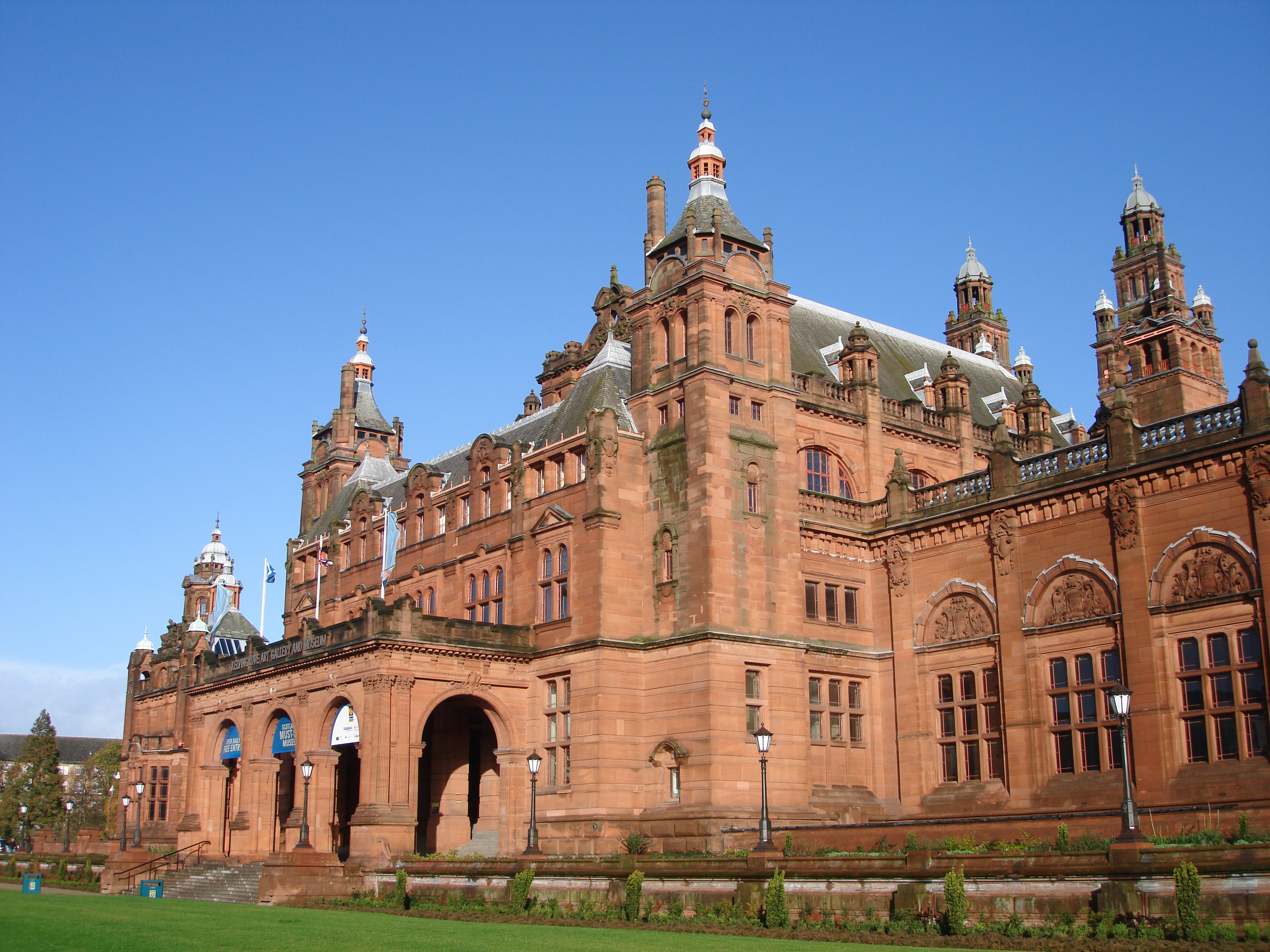
The Kelvingrove Art Gallery and Museum.
