= Hillhead subway station =

Glasgow subway station

Hillhead
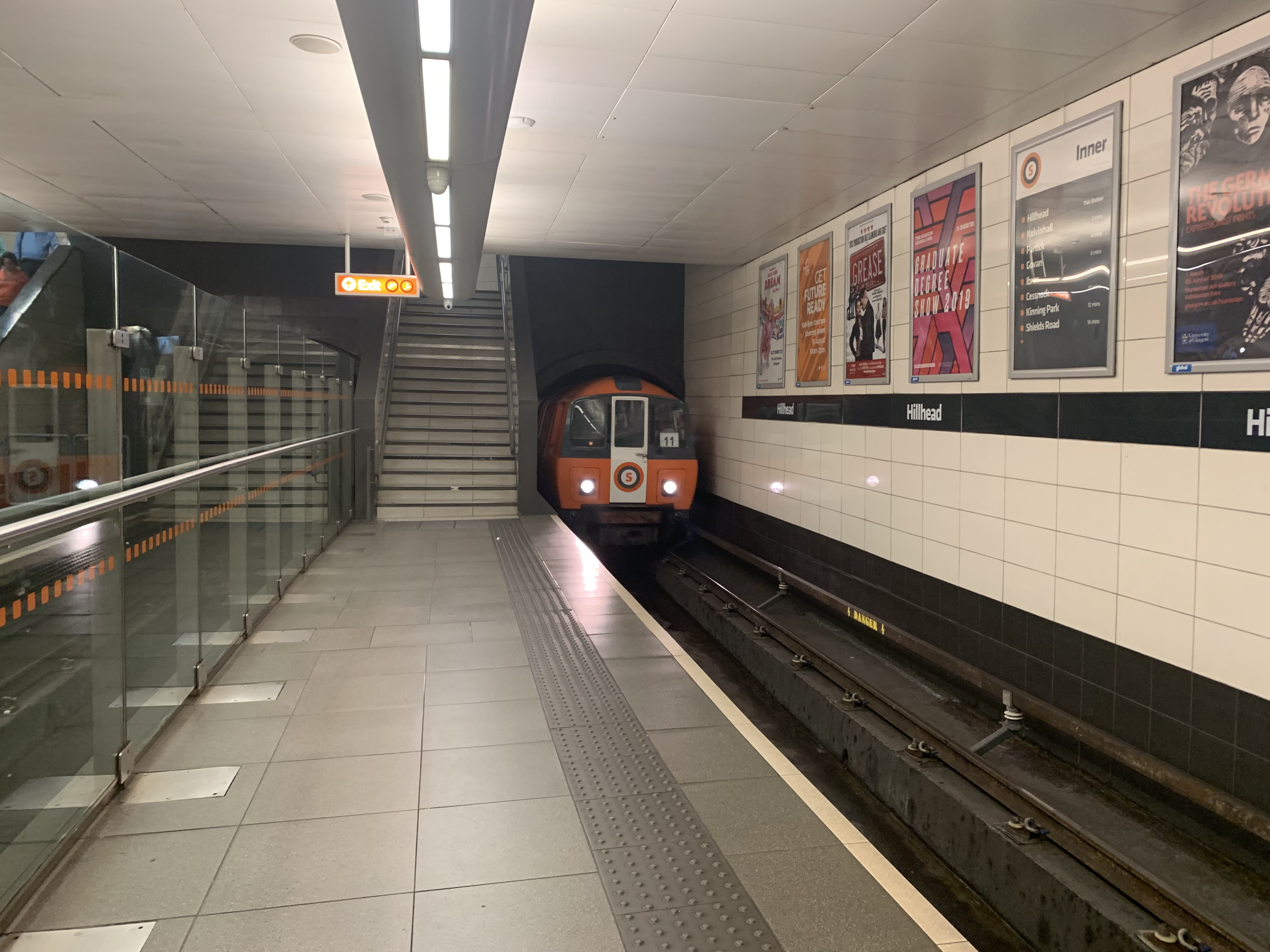

General information
- Location: 248 Byres Road; Hillhead, Glasgow, G12 8SH; Scotland
- Coordinates: 55°52′33″N 4°17′32″W
- Operator: SPT
- Transit authority: SPT
- Platforms: 2 (side platforms)
- Tracks: 2

Construction
- Structure type: Underground
- Parking: No
- Cycle facilities: No
- Accessible: No

Other information
- Fare zone: 1

History
- Opened: 14 December 1896
- Rebuilt: 16 April 1980; 46 years ago

Passengers
- 2018: ▲1.831 million
- 2019: ▲1.837 million
- 2020: ▼0.651 million
- 2021: ▲0.837 million
- 2022: ▲1.623 million

Services
Preceding station	SPT	Following station
Kelvinhall anticlockwise / inner circle	Glasgow Subway	Kelvinbridge clockwise / outer circle
Location
Notes
- Passenger statistics provided are gate entries only. Information on gate exits for patronage is incomplete, and thus not included.

Hillhead subway station is a station on the Glasgow Subway, serving the Hillhead area of Glasgow, Scotland, and is the principal station that serves the city's West End. The entrance is located on Byres Road.

This station is the nearest to Glasgow Botanic Gardens and the University of Glasgow.

The station is one of the busiest on the system with 1.86 million boardings per year. This is largely due to the shopping facilities of Byres Road and proximity to the university, which allows students to travel between campus and the city centre.

== History ==
During the modernisation of the underground system between 1977 and 1980, Hillhead subway station went through major rebuilding. Previously the station had a single island platform serving both tracks; the station was rebuilt with a much more spacious ticket office, escalators and an additional side platform.

Hillhead is one of the stations mentioned in Cliff Hanley's song The Glasgow Underground. The song reflects the traditional local pronunciation of the name, "Hillheed".

== Current layout ==
There are three automated ticket machines located in the entrance way, which leads up to an information centre where passengers may buy tickets of longer duration and get more information on transport in Glasgow. There is also a ticket office which is staffed by one clerk at a time. There are six turnstiles into which a ticket must be entered in order to pass. There are three for entering and three for exiting the subway.

Two escalators and one staircase provide access to the two platforms, and maps are present to guide passengers to the correct platform for their destination.

The platform features, on one side, a perspex barrier with a handrail which was built for safety reasons.

== Modernisation ==
Hillhead was the first station to be upgraded as part of SPT's plan to modernise the Subway at a cost of £1.5million. Under the plans, the escalators were replaced and the interior design was refreshed. Lighting and facilities for disabled people were also improved. In addition, SPT commissioned author and artist Alasdair Gray to create a piece of public artwork for the station. The improvement work was completed in 2012.

=== Alasdair Gray mural ===
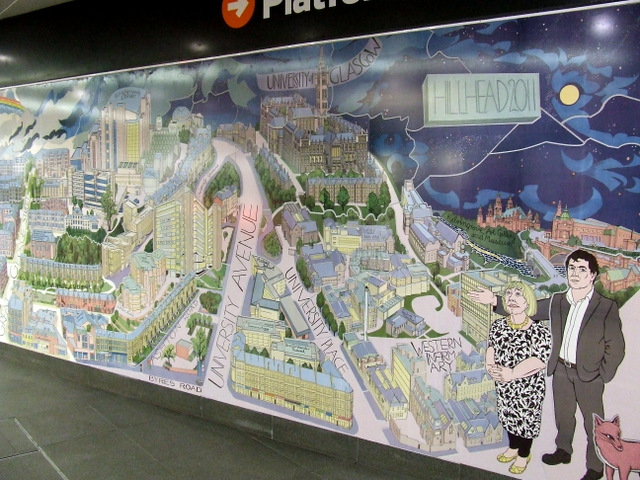
A mural of the surrounding area by Alasdair Gray

On 16 September 2012 a mural that depicts the surrounding area was unveiled in the station's foyer. The work is by Alasdair Gray, and was developed over fourteen months with artist Nichol Wheatley using ceramics. Gray stated, "The station is in the centre of Hillhead, which I know well. Kelvingrove Art Gallery and Museum, the old BBC building and Botanic Gardens had been among my favourite places since the age of eleven. I have lived and worked in the district since 1969, and I knew I would enjoy depicting it, and those who use the subway, in a symbolic and humorous way."

== Past passenger numbers ==
- 2011/12: 1.834 million annually
