= Kelvinhall subway station =

Glasgow subway station

Kelvinhall Taigh Cheilbhinn
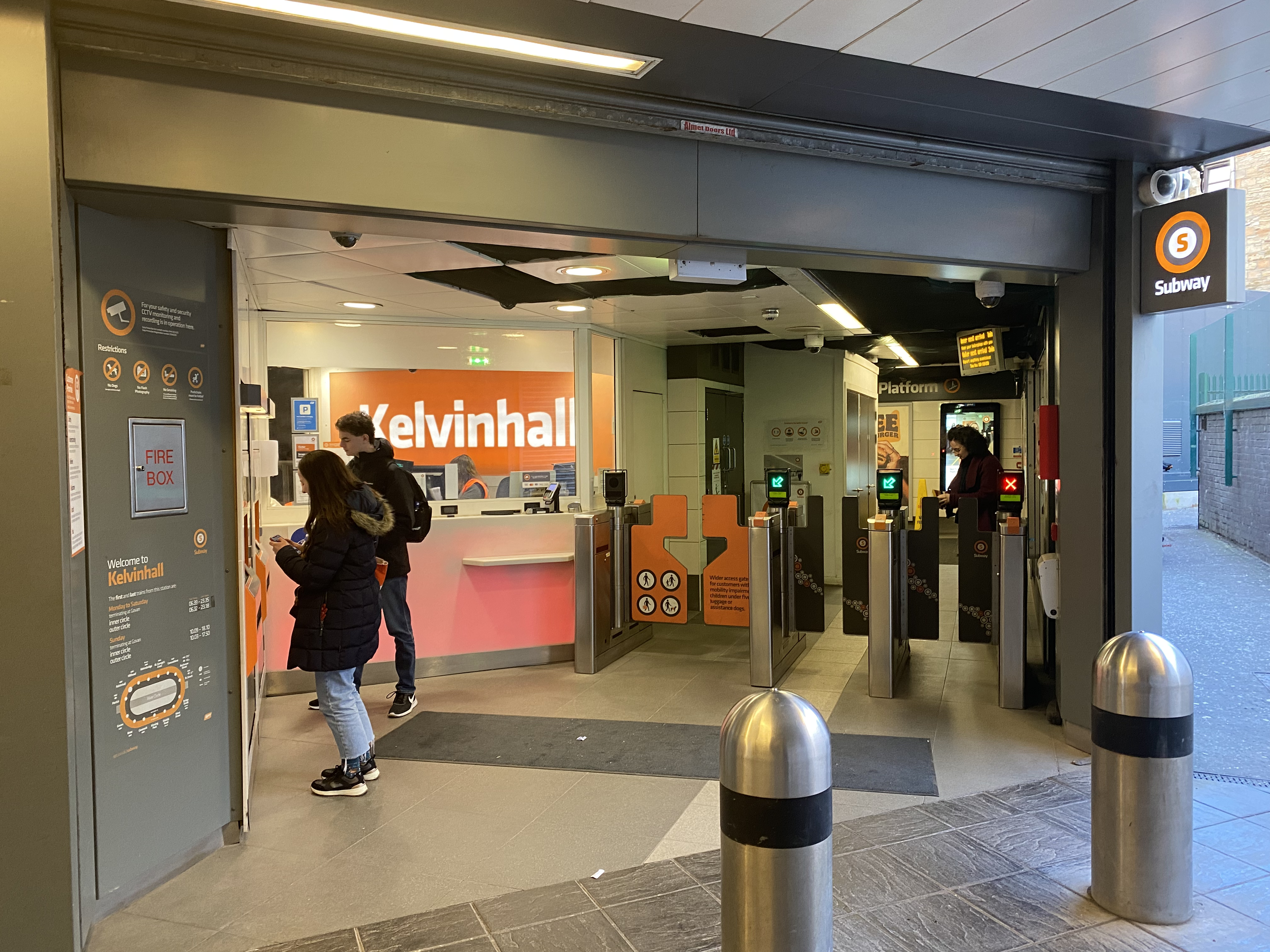

General information
- Location: 7 Dalcross Path; Partick, Glasgow, G11 5RA; Scotland
- Coordinates: 55°52′16″N 4°18′02″W
- Operator: SPT
- Transit authority: SPT
- Platforms: 2 (island platform)
- Tracks: 2

Construction
- Structure type: Underground
- Parking: No
- Cycle facilities: No
- Accessible: No

Other information
- Fare zone: 1

History
- Opened: 14 December 1896
- Rebuilt: 16 April 1980; 46 years ago
- Former names: Partick Cross (1896–1977)

Passengers
- 2018: ▲0.686 million
- 2019: ▲0.708 million
- 2020: ▼0.232 million
- 2021: ▲0.321 million
- 2022: ▲0.641 million

Services
Preceding station	SPT	Following station
Partick anticlockwise / inner circle	Glasgow Subway	Hillhead clockwise / outer circle
Location
Notes
- Passenger statistics provided are gate entries only. Information on gate exits for patronage is incomplete, and thus not included.

Kelvinhall (Scottish Gaelic: Taigh Cheilbhinn), known as Partick Cross until 1977, is an underground station on the Glasgow Subway, renamed after the nearby Kelvin Hall. It is located in the West End of Glasgow, Scotland, near to many of the city's best known tourist destinations including:

- The Kelvingrove Art Gallery and Museum
- Kelvingrove Park
- The University of Glasgow

There was previously a Kelvin Hall railway station, but it was unattached to the subway station, which was at any rate still known as Partick Cross at the time of that station's closure in 1964 as part of the Beeching axe.

The station entrance is located off Dumbarton Road at the end of a narrow arcade of shops below flats. The station retains its original island platform layout and has no escalators. The renovation work at Kelvinhall station during the 1977–1980 modernisation of the Subway was not as extensive as most of the other stations on the network: other than Cessnock, it is the only station to retain its original entrance and surface buildings, which would be virtually invisible from the street without the signage.

Kelvinhall (under its former name of Partick Cross) is one of the stations mentioned in Cliff Hanley's song The Glasgow Underground.

The Glasgow Subway is operated by the Strathclyde Partnership for Transport (SPT).

== Transport links ==
First Glasgow operated bus routes 2, 3, 8, 77, 90, M4 and N2 serve the station. Other bus routes that serve Kelvinhall are the riversider service 100, operated by Community Transport Glasgow, routes 189 and 190, operated by Hobson Travel and ARG Travel, and routes X25 and X25A, operated by Stagecoach West Scotland.

== Past passenger numbers ==
- 2011/12: 0.646 million annually

== Gallery ==
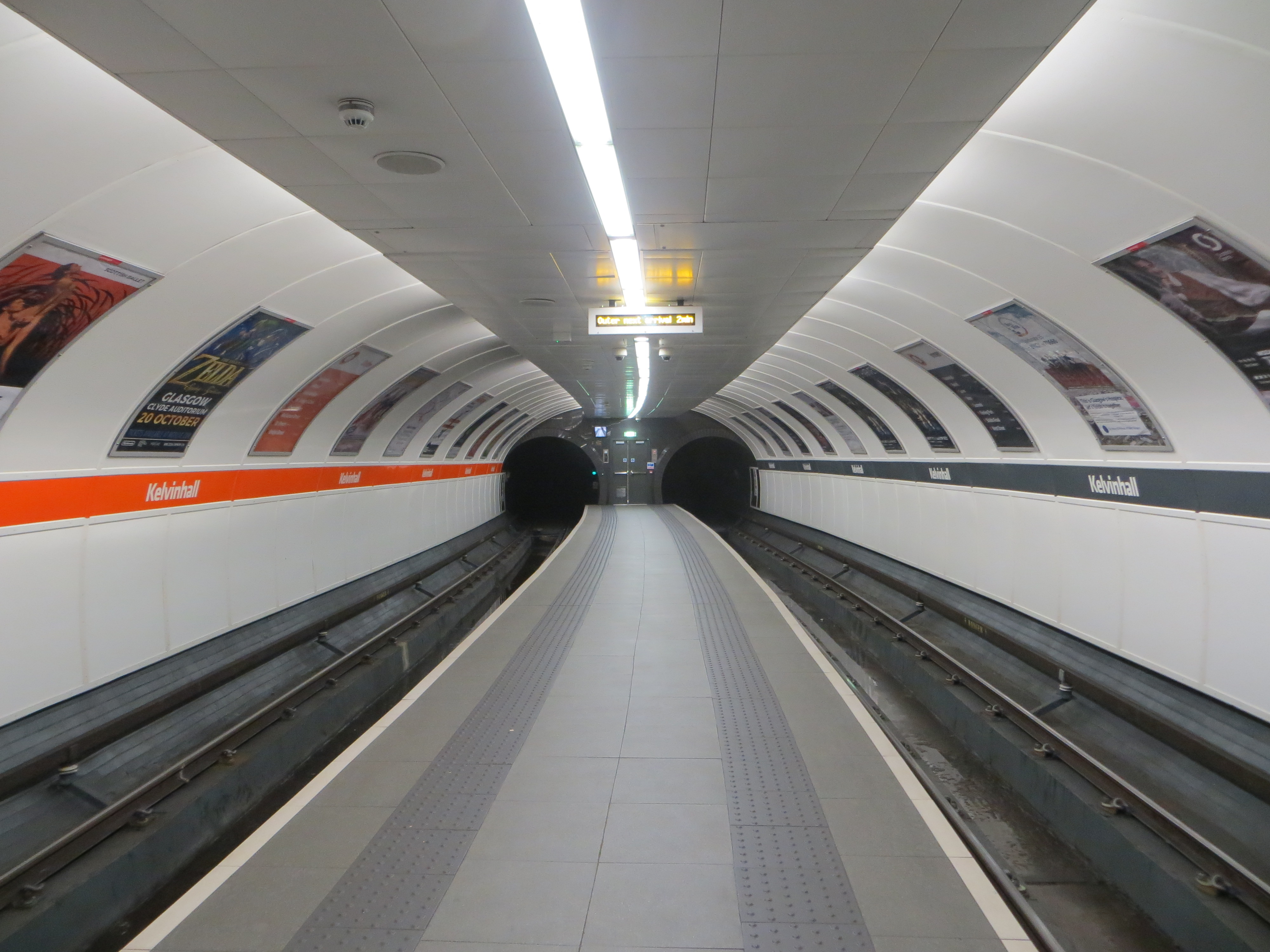
Island platform
