= Partickhill =

District of Glasgow, Scotland

Coordinates: 55.8745°N 4.3079°W

Partickhill: Scottish Gaelic: A' Bhrae na Partaig; Scots: Pairtickhull
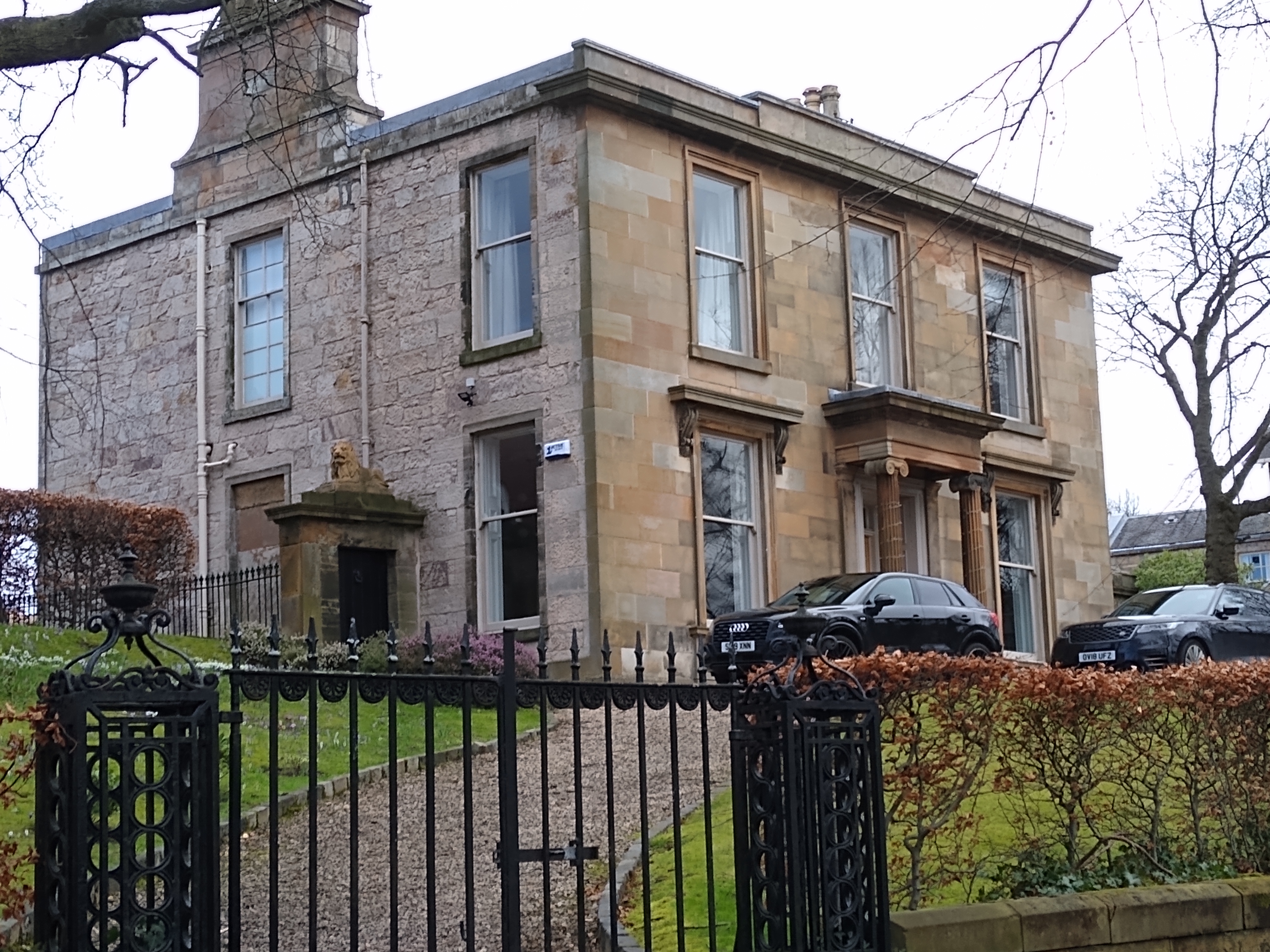
- 56 Partickhill Road, 2021

- Location within Glasgow
- OS grid reference: NS557670
- Council area: Glasgow City Council
- Lieutenancy area: Glasgow
- Country: Scotland
- Sovereign state: United Kingdom
- Post town: GLASGOW
- Postcode district: G11
- Dialling code: 0141
- Police: Scotland
- Fire: Scottish
- Ambulance: Scottish
- UK Parliament: Glasgow North
- Scottish Parliament: Glasgow Kelvin

Partickhill (Scottish Gaelic: A' Bhrae na Partaig) is a district of the city of Glasgow. Located to the north of Partick, south of Hyndland and west of Dowanhill, it contains mixed housing stock of tenemental type property and villa style houses, as well as some terraced homes.

== Overview ==
Partickhill railway station closed in 1979 and a new station opened to the south (Partick railway station). Middlefield Special School, which opened in 1907 was in the area, occupied the building of the former Anderston Street School's Cripple Children's Class. The school specialised in the education and care of autistic children. The former school was demolished around 2019 and replaced with a new development of 63, 1, 2 and 3 bedroom residential properties constructed by Westpoint Homes. The development was completed in 2022.

The area lacks amenities of its own, but is closely located to those available on either Dumbarton Road or Hyndland Road.

Partickhill Bowling and Community Club is located on Partickhill Road.

== St Kentigern Hostel ==
St Kentigern's Hostel, formerly Wellpark House and St Peter's College, is a category B listed building in Partickhill. It is a Jacobean-style building, constructed around 1869. It was situated on Partickhill Road and Hyndland Street next to Dowanhill. In 1874, the building became St Peter's College, a seminary for men training to become Roman Catholic priests. In 1877, a small wooden chapel was built behind the house. In 1892, the college was moved to Bearsden. In 1906, the Archdiocese of Glasgow turned the building into a St Kentigern's Hostel, a residence for students at nearby teacher training college. It was run by the Marist Brothers. From 1954 to 1956, the interior of the house was renovated by Gillespie, Kidd & Coia. In the 1960s it was a residence for students at the Notre Dame College of Education in Bearsden. In 1991, flats were built within the property grounds, behind the house. The house became a listed building on 6 February 1989.

The house has been converted into luxury flats with parking. Some original features have been retained in the B listed building.
