= Buchanan Street station =

Buchanan Street station may refer to:

- Buchanan Street railway station, a closed railway station in Glasgow
- Buchanan Street subway station, a subway station also in Glasgow
