= M4 Anniesland–Partick =

Bus route in Glasgow

M4

Overview
- Operator: Craigs of Cumbernauld
- Status: Operating
- Began service: October 2016

Route
- Start: Anniesland
- Via: Kelvindale
- End: Partick bus station

Service
- Frequency: Hourly

Route M4 is a bus route in Glasgow. It runs between Anniesland and Partick via Kelvindale. It is operated by First Glasgow, who have subcontracted the route to Craigs of Cumbernauld.

== History ==
The service was introduced in October 2016 and operated half-hourly between Anniesland and Kelvindale. It partly replaced route 4A, which was withdrawn. From 5 December, the frequency was reduced to hourly and the route changed to the current route between Anniesland and Partick.

In April 2017, First stated that passenger figures were low and that operating the bus was losing the company around £1,100 per week. From August onward, the route was supported by the Strathclyde Partnership for Transport.

Since August 2020, operation of the route has been subcontracted to Craigs of Cumbernauld.
