= Merkland Street subway station =

Former railway station in Scotland

Merkland Street

General information
- Location: Partick, Glasgow; Scotland
- Coordinates: 55.8701°N 4.3097°W
- Platforms: 1

Other information
- Status: Disused

History
- Opened: 14 December 1896; 129 years ago closed same day 21 February 1897; 129 years ago reopened
- Closed: 21 May 1977; 49 years ago
- Original company: Glasgow District Subway
Location

Merkland Street station was one of the original 15 stations on the Glasgow Subway. It is the only ghost station on the system (i.e. a station that trains still pass through but is disused by passengers). The station opened in 1896. It was located 25 metres (27 yd) to the south-west of its replacement, Partick station and about 300 metres (330 yd) to the south of Partickhill railway station. It closed permanently in 1977 when the rest of the network was closed for modernisation. The modernisation had been announced in 1974 by the subway's then operators, the Greater Glasgow Passenger Transport Executive (GGPTE). Although converted to electric traction in 1935, the system's infrastructure and rolling stock was virtually unchanged from its opening in 1896, and improvement to the subway was seen by the GGPTE as an essential part of plans to eliminate transport bottlenecks in the city. As part of the process, which began in 1977, all 15 stations were to be rebuilt. However it was planned to link the subway to the national rail network's newly reopened Argyle Line at Partick via an interchange station. This meant permanently closing Merkland Street and opening a new station a short distance away.

Thus, when the network reopened in 1980, it was replaced by a new station nearby named Partick, offering direct transfers to the rail station of the same name. There is evidence of Merkland Street station's existence due to a long straight and humped stretch on the underground with large diameter tunnels, although the platforms and station buildings no longer remain.

On 18 September 1940, during World War II, a German bomb, which dropped during a night raid on Glasgow and may have been intended for nearby naval facilities, landed on a bowling green to the south of the station. The explosion this caused resulted in damage to both tunnels and closure of this part of the system until repairs were completed in January 1941.

Merkland Street is one of the stations mentioned in Francie and Josie's song Glasgow Underground.
