= Partick station =

Glasgow subway and railway station

Partick Partaig
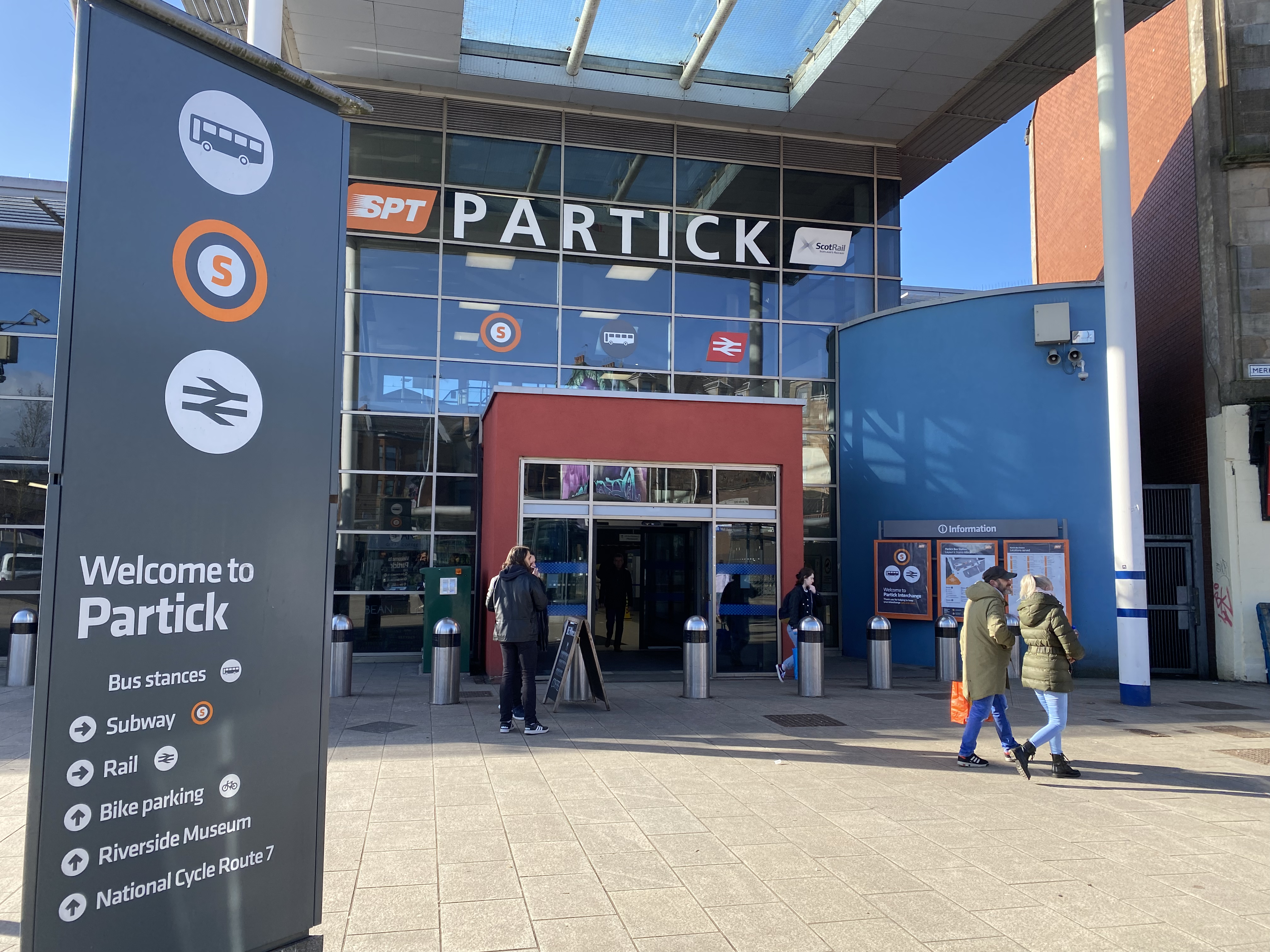
- Main entrance on Merkland Street

General information
- Location: Partick, Glasgow; Scotland
- Coordinates: 55.8698°N 4.3092°W
- Grid reference: NS555664
- Manager: ScotRail
- Transit authority: SPT
- Platforms: 2 ScotRail and 2 Glasgow Subway
- Bus stands: 6
- Connections: National Cycle Route 7

Construction
- Cycle facilities: 144 bike shed spaces
- Accessible: Step-free access

Other information
- Station code: PTK
- Fare zone: 1

History
- Opened: 17 December 1979; 46 years ago
- Original company: British Railways

Passengers
- 2021/22: ▲1.665 million
- Interchange: ▲0.175 million
- 2022/23: ▲2.103 million
- Interchange: ▲0.231 million
- 2023/24: ▲2.850 million
- Interchange: ▲0.422 million
- 2024/25: ▲3.092 million
- Interchange: ▲0.561 million
- 2025/26: ▲3.210 million
- Interchange: ▲0.649 million
Location
Notes
- Passenger statistics from the Office of Rail and Road. Station usage figures saw a large decrease in 2020/21 due to the COVID-19 pandemic.

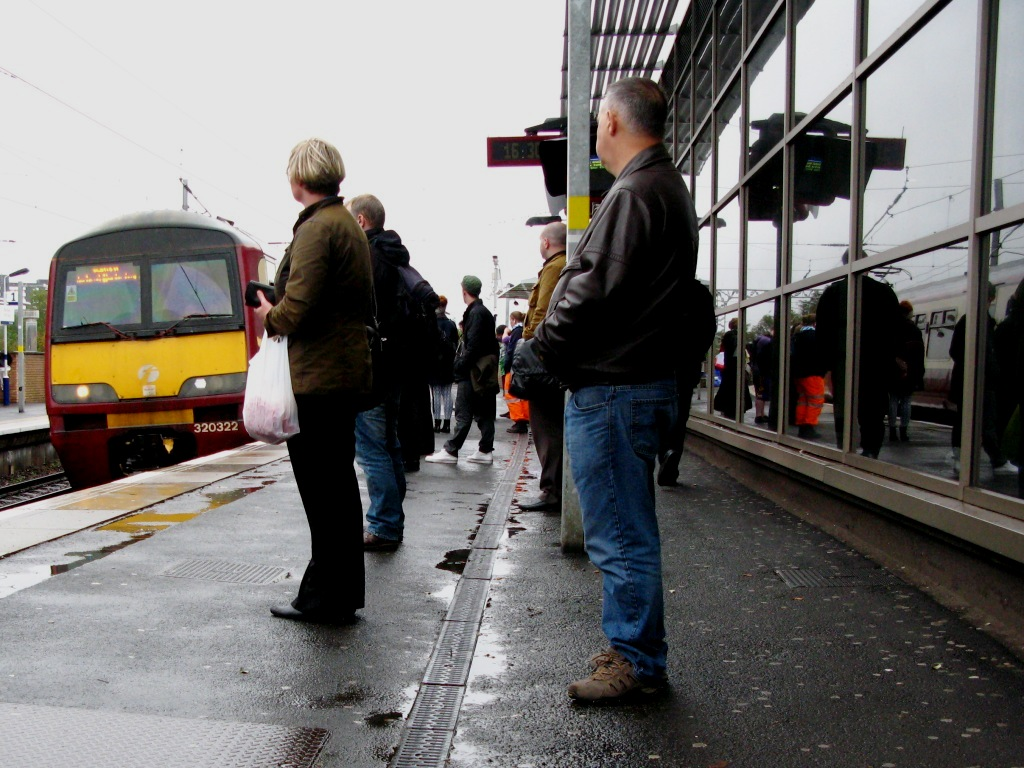
Passengers join a westbound service

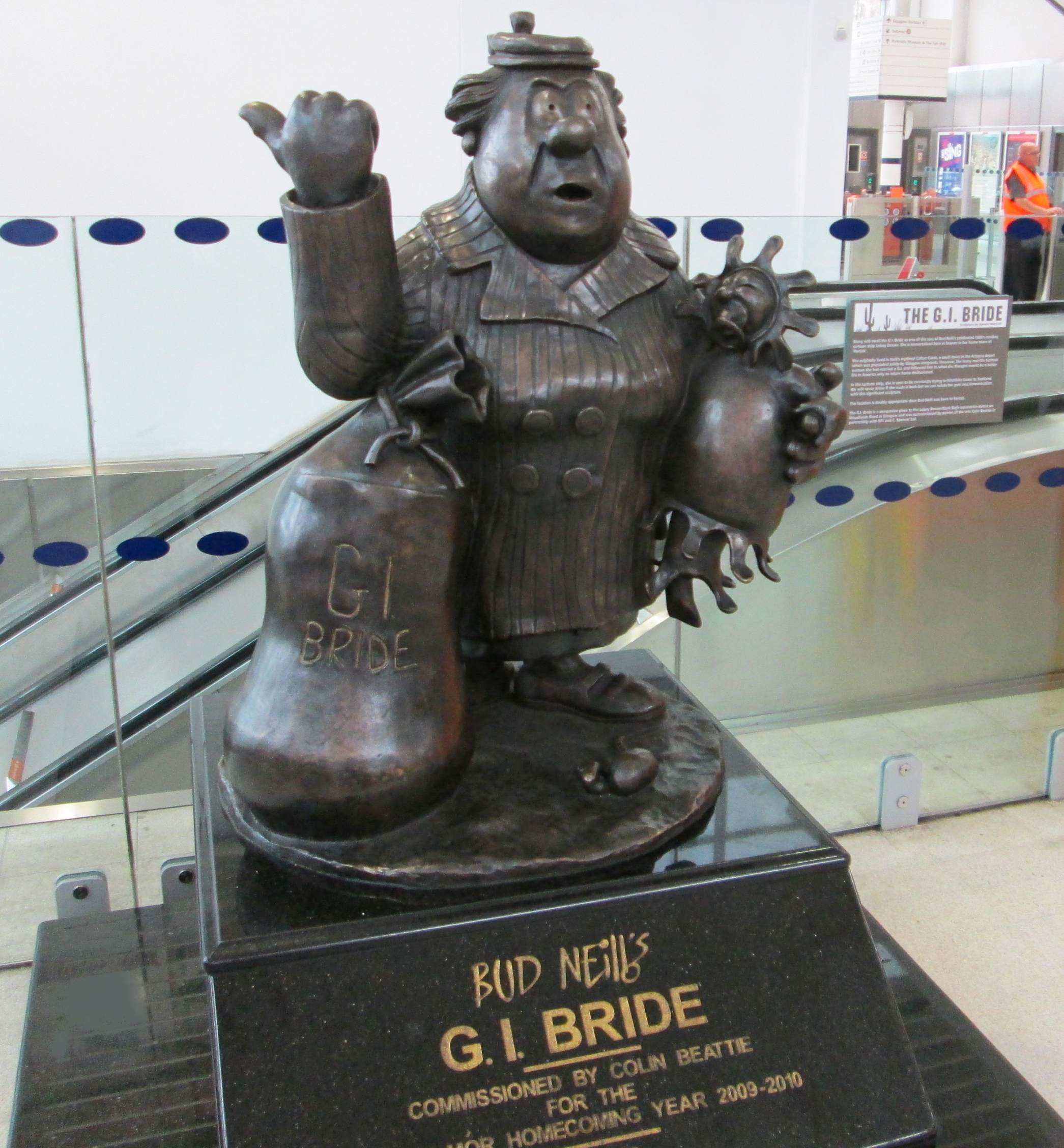
Statue of Bud Neill's G.I. Bride character (and baby Ned) from his Lobey Dosser cartoon series, erected in Partick station in 2011 to commemorate her determined efforts to thumb a lift from the fictional Calton Creek in Arizona back to Partick.

Partick Station (Scottish Gaelic: Partaig) is a combined National Rail and Glasgow Subway station in the Partick area of Glasgow, Scotland. Along with the adjacent bus station, it forms one of the main transport hubs in Glasgow. As of 2022, it was the fifth-busiest station in Scotland, but was overtaken in 2023. The station is served by Glasgow Subway and ScotRail services and was one of the first to receive bilingual English and Gaelic signs, due to the significant Gaelic-speaking population in the surrounding Partick area.

== History ==
The first station in the area was the North British Railway's Partickhill, opened in 1887 slightly to the north of the existing site on the opposite side of the Dumbarton Road. Soon after, the Glasgow Subway opened and its Merkland Street station, slightly to the south of the existing station site, opened in December 1896. Neither was independently known as "Partick station" as there were two other railway stations in Partick between the late 19th and mid-20th centuries: Partick Central (later renamed Kelvin Hall station) to the east with Partick West and Crow Road to the west.

=== Argyle Line opening ===
The Beeching Axe of the 1960s closed Partick West and Partick Central, both on the Lanarkshire and Dunbartonshire Railway link to the Stobcross Railway and Glasgow Central Railway, leaving just the two stations in Partick, with Partickhill station - which escaped closure owing to being on the newly electrified (1960) North Clyde line from Queen Street Low Level, served by the 'Blue Trains', with a major pre-electrification refurbishment in 1958. It stood a few hundred yards north of Merkland Street. The amalgamation of the two stations to a single site came in 1979, as a major refurbishment of the Glasgow Subway coincided with the Greater Glasgow Passenger Transport Executive's decision to reopen part of the Glasgow Central Railway, which had been axed by Beeching, as the Argyle Line and connecting it to the North Clyde system just east of Partick. Both stations were closed (Merkland Street had been since the Subway works began in May 1977, whilst Partickhill remained in service for several months after the Argyle Line opened, until replaced by the current Partick station) and replaced by British Rail with a new combined Partick station in the middle. The platforms at Partickhill are still visible from the North Clyde/Argyle Line, although access to Dumbarton Road is now blocked. The Merkland Street station buildings are no longer visible.

The station is one of the primary stations on the Argyle Line and North Clyde Line of the Glasgow suburban rail network. These lines primarily provide services to the east and west although the station itself is orientated north–south with two platforms. Statistically, it is the tenth busiest railway station in Scotland and the fifth busiest passenger interchange when subway and bus journeys from the site are included.

== National Rail ==
Partick station is on a busy section of the Strathclyde rail network, served by all services on the Argyle Line and North Clyde Line.

Eastbound Argyle Line trains serve Rutherglen and Cambuslang, before continuing to Motherwell, Lanark, Coatbridge Central via Bellshill or Hamilton Central, as well as Larkhall. Eastbound North Clyde Line trains operate to Edinburgh Waverley, Airdrie, Springburn eastbound, via Glasgow Queen Street. Westbound services operate to Balloch and Helensburgh Central via Dalmuir, and to Milngavie.

Many journeys that interchange between the Argyle and North Clyde lines require passengers to change at Partick, as it is the closest station to central Glasgow with direct services to both Glasgow Central and Glasgow Queen Street main line stations.

=== November 1979 (from opening of Argyle Line) ===
There were 15 trains per hour at opening of the Argyle Line in November 1979.

- 2 tph Motherwell to Dalmuir, via Bellshill and Yoker
- 1 tph Motherwell to Dumbarton Central, via Bellshill and Yoker
- 2 tph Motherwell to Dalmuir, via Hamilton Central and Singer
- 1 tph Motherwell to Dumbarton Central, via Hamilton Central and Singer
- 1 tph Lanark to Milngavie, limited stop via Motherwell
- 2 tph Springburn to Milngavie
- 2 tph Airdrie to Helensburgh, limited stop
- 2 tph Airdrie to Balloch via Singer
- 2 tph High Street to Yoker

=== 2010/2011 (From 12 December 2010) ===
There are 14 trains per hour, off-peak, in each direction.

- 2 tph Airdrie to Balloch, via Singer
- 2 tph Springburn to Dalmuir, via Yoker
- 2 tph Edinburgh Waverley to Milngavie (limited stop)
- 2 tph Edinburgh Waverley to Helensburgh Central (limited stop)
- 2 tph Larkhall to Dalmuir, via Singer (limited stop)
- 1 tph Lanark to Dalmuir, via Bellshill and Yoker
- 1 tph Motherwell to Dalmuir, via Bellshill and Yoker
- 1 tph Motherwell to Milngavie, via Hamilton Central
- 1 tph Lanark to Milngavie, via Hamilton Central

=== 2016 ===
The basic frequency still remains 14tph each way, but following a major timetable recast in December 2014 some routes have been changed. The main alteration has been the incorporation of the Whifflet Line into the Argyle Line timetable and the consequent removal of trains to Lanark via Belshill (passengers for those stations now have to change at Cambuslang or Glasgow Central, as they run to/from Central High Level). Springburn line services have now also been extended to Cumbernauld eastbound and Dumbarton Central westbound on weekdays, with an hourly service to Cumbernauld via Springburn starting/terminating here on Sundays.

=== 2025 (from 18 May 2025) ===
The frequency was lowered after the COVID-19 pandemic to 12tph in each direction, following the consolidation of the services to Edinburgh Waverley, Milngavie and Springburn.

North Clyde Line

- 2 tph Edinburgh Waverley to Helensburgh Central (limited stop)
- 2 tph Springburn to Milngavie
- 2 tph Airdrie to Balloch, via Singer

Argyle Line

- 2 tph Cumbernauld or Motherwell to Dalmuir, via Hamilton Central & Yoker (eastbound) or Singer (westbound)
- 2 tph Motherwell or Whifflet to Dalmuir, via Yoker
- 2 tph Larkhall to Dalmuir, via Hamilton Central & Singer (eastbound) or Yoker (westbound)

Preceding station	National Rail	Following station
Exhibition Centre	ScotRail; Argyle Line	Hyndland
Charing Cross	ScotRail; North Clyde Line	Hyndland

== Glasgow Subway ==
Partick Partaig
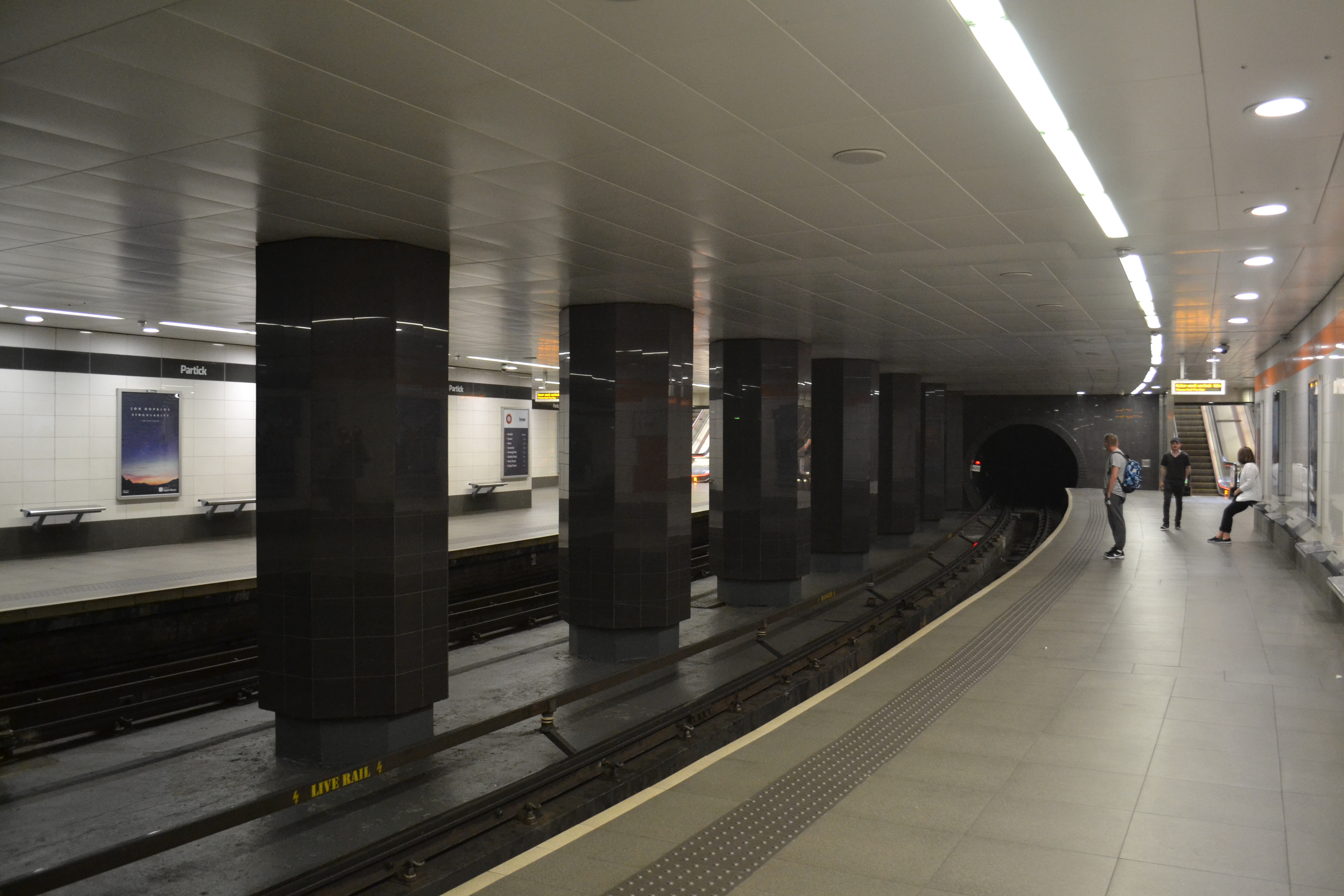

General information
- Location: 15 Merkland Street; Partick, Glasgow, G11 6DB; Scotland
- Operator: SPT
- Platforms: 2 (side platforms)
- Tracks: 2
- Connections: Partick; Partick Bus Station

Construction
- Structure type: Underground
- Parking: No
- Cycle facilities: Yes (bike shed and bike hire)
- Accessible: No

History
- Opened: 16 April 1980; 46 years ago

Passengers
- 2018: ▲0.940 million
- 2019: ▲0.943 million
- 2020: ▼0.395 million
- 2021: ▲0.504 million
- 2022: ▲0.855 million

Services
Preceding station	SPT	Following station
Govan anticlockwise / inner circle	Glasgow Subway	Kelvinhall clockwise / outer circle
Location
Notes
- Passenger statistics provided are gate entries only. Information on gate exits for patronage is incomplete, and thus not included.

Partick subway station (Scottish Gaelic: Fo-rèile Phartaig) is one of the largest stations on the Glasgow Subway network, and has around 1.01 million boardings per year. This is due in part to its situation within the city and also the National Rail network. Partick is a relatively large population centre of Glasgow housing around 100,000 people, a significant number of whom use the subway to commute to the city centre.

Furthermore, Partick station is an interchange for two lines on the National Rail network. People commuting from outside Glasgow to one of the areas covered by the underground network may choose to continue their journey from Partick to allow for ease of transfer between the services and to avoid a lengthy walk between (for example) Glasgow Central and St Enoch.

It is one of only three with a dual side platform layout (the others being Govan and St Enoch). The rest have either a single central platform covering both circles or two platforms with a track running at the same side of each. The new Partick station replaced Merkland Street, which was located to the south, after modernisation. It should not be confused with the old Partick Cross station which is now known as Kelvinhall and is the next station clockwise from Partick.

It is the only station on the Subway that interchanges directly with a railway station, although Buchanan Street is linked to Queen Street by a length of moving walkway. St Enoch once shared this distinction, before its parent St Enoch railway station was closed in the 1960s and demolished in 1977.

Partick is one of three subway stations on the SPT Subway line to benefit from mobile telephone service nodes, the others being Buchanan Street and Hillhead. These nodes allow users of the O2 cellular network to use their mobile telephones while waiting on a subway train. The idea was to trial the technology at the busiest stations and, if successful, to put similar devices at each station eventually extending service across the entire network. As yet, the trial is incomplete.

The Partick subway station is not wheelchair accessible. The only two Glasgow Subway stations with wheelchair access are Govan and St Enoch, both of which feature a lift and escalator. Partick Subway Station is one of the stations that includes escalators along with Buchanan St, Cowcaddens, Govan, Hillhead, Kelvinbridge, Shields Road, St George's Cross and St Enoch.

=== Past passenger numbers ===
- 2011/2012: 1.032 million annually

== Bus station ==
The bus station is situated at ground level, above the Subway but below National Rail services. It was closed from October 2017 to September 2018 for a £2.5 million refurbishment. It is served by the following routes, as of May 2025:

Stance 1 (services via Clyde Tunnel)

- First Glasgow 8 towards QEU Hospital
- First Glasgow 16 towards QEU Hospital
- First Glasgow 77 towards QEU Hospital, Braehead and/or Glasgow Airport

Stance 2

- First Glasgow 90 towards QEU Hospital (via Hillhead, Springburn, Parkhead, Shawlands and Govan)

Stance 3

- First Glasgow 8 towards Parkhead (via Hillhead, Summerston, Springburn and Robroyston)
- McColl's Travel 141 towards Gartnavel Hospital (via Broomhill)

Stance 4

- First Glasgow 2 towards Faifley (via Clydebank)

Stance 5

- First Glasgow 3 towards Drumchapel
- First Glasgow 16 towards Blairdardie (via Anniesland and Knightswood)
- West Coast Motors M4 towards Anniesland (via Hyndland and Kelvindale)

Stance 6

- Avondale Coaches 400 towards Drumchapel

== Modernisation ==
=== 2005–2009 project ===
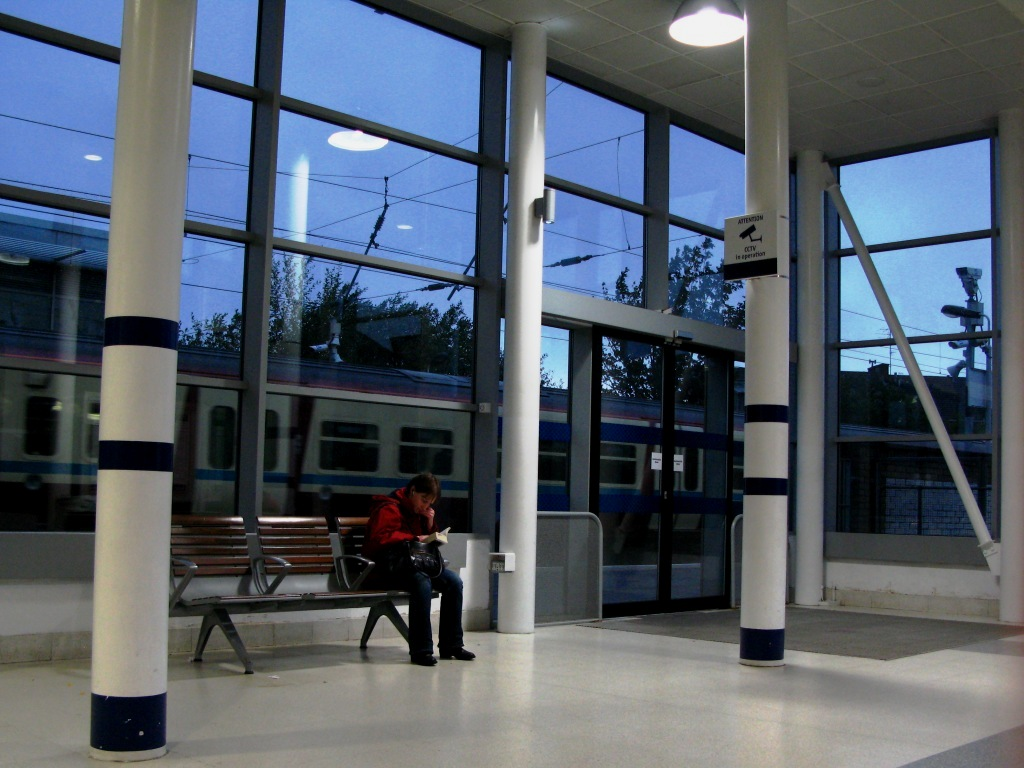
Inside the eastbound waiting room

Strathclyde Passenger Transport Authority began planning an extensive modernisation of the Partick station site – which had remained largely unchanged since its opening in 1979 – as early as 1998. Work began in late 2005 and was originally scheduled for completion in January 2007. However, delays to the project resulted in this date being put back on a number of occasions. The demolition and construction work was carried out while the site remained open to avoid any disruption in rail and underground services, arguably one of the most ambitious attributes of the project.

The total cost of the project was estimated to be around £12.3 million with professional fees and third-party costs accounting for £2.6 million of this. However, due to delays in the progression of the works and unforeseen difficulties – such as ground conditions on the land the station occupies, only discovered after the commencement of work – the company in charge of the development, C Spencer Construction, made a claim for a further £6.3 million.

In early 2009, the project finally reached its conclusion and on 31 March, the new station was officially opened to the public. The work done includes the construction of a completely new and modern station building which incorporates a brand new ticket office (which has been in use since 2008). The station concourse has been completely renovated and new signs have been posted similar to those seen in Glasgow Central and Queen Street stations. Both railway platforms have been refurbished and now have their own indoor waiting rooms. Lifts linking the concourse to the National Rail platforms were installed.

=== 2012–2013 project ===
The Subway platforms were renovated between summer 2012 and spring 2013 at a cost of £1.2 million. All floor, wall, and ceiling finishes were replaced with new contemporary designs. Improved lighting, signage, and facilities for disabled people were introduced.

Lifts linking the concourse to the Subway platforms were to be installed as part of this project because the necessary land is not owned by SPT. The future provision of lifts has, however, been safeguarded.
