= Govan subway station =

Glasgow subway station

Govan Baile a' Ghobhainn
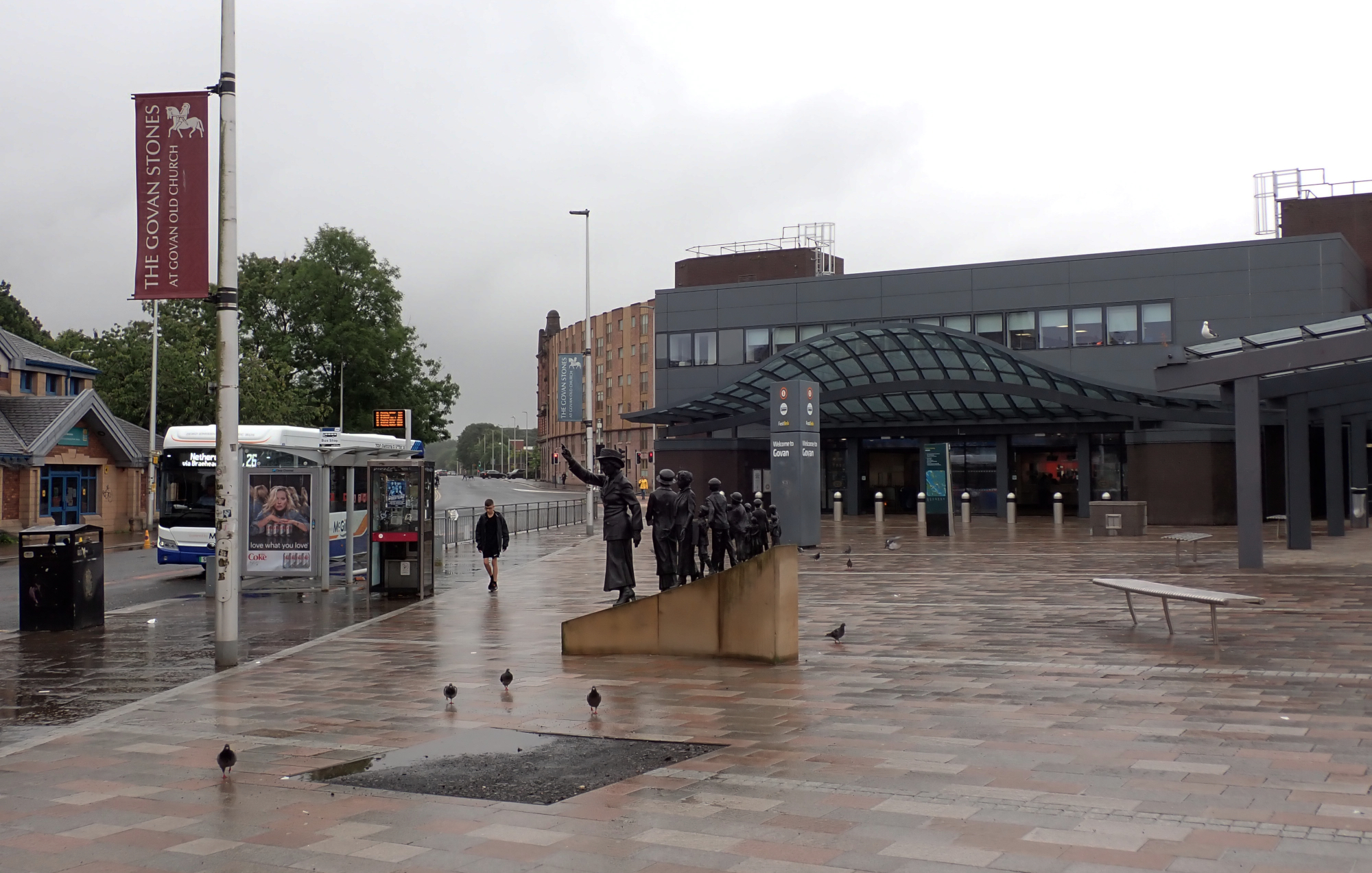

General information
- Location: 737 Govan Road; Govan, Glasgow, G51 2YJ; Scotland
- Coordinates: 55°51′44″N 4°18′38″W
- Operator: SPT
- Transit authority: SPT
- Platforms: 2 (side platforms)
- Tracks: 2
- Bus stands: 6
- Connections: Govan Bus Station

Construction
- Structure type: Underground
- Parking: No
- Cycle facilities: Yes (bike shed)
- Accessible: Yes (step-free access)

Other information
- Fare zone: 1

History
- Opened: 14 December 1896
- Rebuilt: 16 April 1980; 46 years ago
- Former names: Govan Cross (1896–1977)

Passengers
- 2018: ▲0.802 million
- 2019: ▲0.803 million
- 2020: ▼0.372 million
- 2021: ▲0.426 million
- 2022: ▲0.656 million

Services
Preceding station	SPT	Following station
Ibrox anticlockwise / inner circle	Glasgow Subway	Partick clockwise / outer circle
Location
Notes
- Passenger statistics provided are gate entries only. Information on gate exits for patronage is incomplete, and thus not included.

Govan subway station (Scottish Gaelic: Baile a' Ghobhainn) is a station that serves the area of Govan in Glasgow, Scotland. It is located on the south side of the River Clyde. Just south of the station is the main depot and test track for the Glasgow Subway. The station is located near the historic Govan Old Parish Church.

This station forms an interchange with Govan bus station, being adjacent to it. This, combined with the fact that the subway to Partick forms the only rail link across the Clyde west of the city centre, means that it is one of the busier stations. Annual passenger boardings have fallen below one million in recent years and with 990,000 recorded in 2004/05.

The station has two platforms. Prior to its closure for modernisation in 1977, the station was called Govan Cross. The appearance of cracks in the roof of the old station led to its premature closure in 1977, before the modernisation programme could take place. As part of this programme, the station's surface buildings were replaced, and its single island platform was changed to a dual side platform arrangement.

Govan (under its former name of Govan Cross) is one of the stations mentioned in Cliff Hanley's song The Glasgow Underground.

Govan includes a lift and escalator. Along with St Enoch subway station, it is one of two Glasgow Subway stations that is wheelchair accessible.

On 29 June 2011, a man died after being hit by one of the service's rolling stock at 09:12.

== Past passenger numbers ==
- 2004/05: 0.990 million annually
- 2011/12: 0.945 million annually
