= St Enoch subway station =

Glasgow subway station

St Enoch Ceàrnag Èanaig
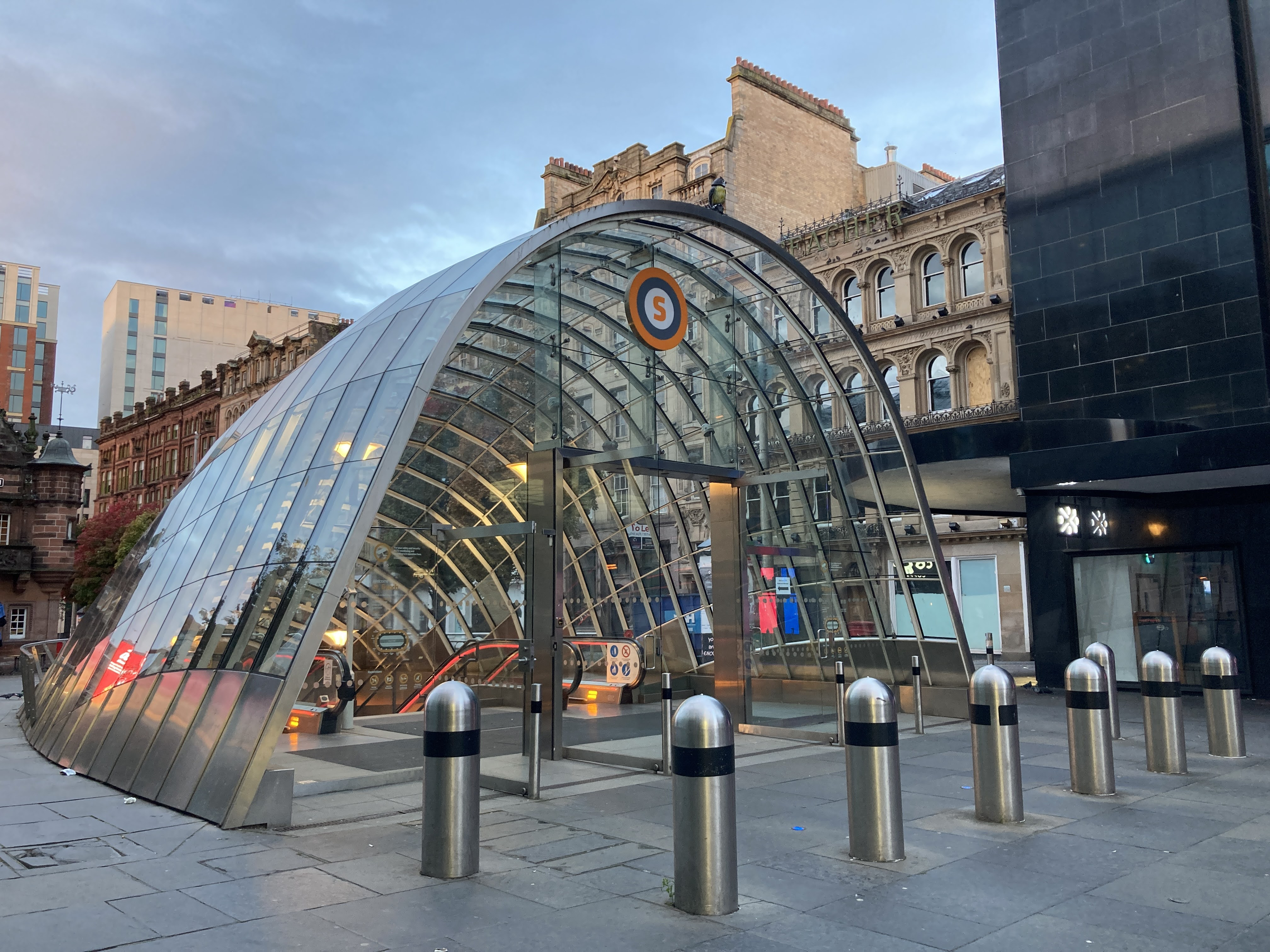
- North entrance from Argyle Street

General information
- Location: 10 St Enoch Square; Glasgow, G1 4DB; Scotland
- Coordinates: 55°51′25″N 4°15′21″W
- Operator: SPT
- Transit authority: SPT
- Platforms: 2 (side platforms)
- Tracks: 2
- Connections: Glasgow Central; Argyle Street

Construction
- Structure type: Underground
- Parking: No
- Cycle facilities: Yes (bike hire)
- Accessible: Yes (step-free access)

Other information
- Fare zone: 1

History
- Opened: 14 December 1896
- Rebuilt: 16 April 1980; 46 years ago

Passengers
- 2018: ▲1.991 million
- 2019: ▼1.986 million
- 2020: ▼0.734 million
- 2021: ▲0.910 million
- 2022: ▲1.589 million

Services
Preceding station	SPT	Following station
Buchanan Street anticlockwise / inner circle	Glasgow Subway	Bridge Street clockwise / outer circle
Location
Notes
- Passenger statistics provided are gate entries only. Information on gate exits for patronage is incomplete, and thus not included.

St Enoch subway station (Scottish Gaelic: Ceàrn Èanaig) is a station on the Glasgow Subway in Scotland. It is located north of the River Clyde in Glasgow city centre. Although it does not have direct interchange with the main line railway, it is located approximately halfway between the Glasgow Central and Argyle Street railway stations, within a few minutes' walk to both. The subway station is accessible via St Enoch Square.

== History ==
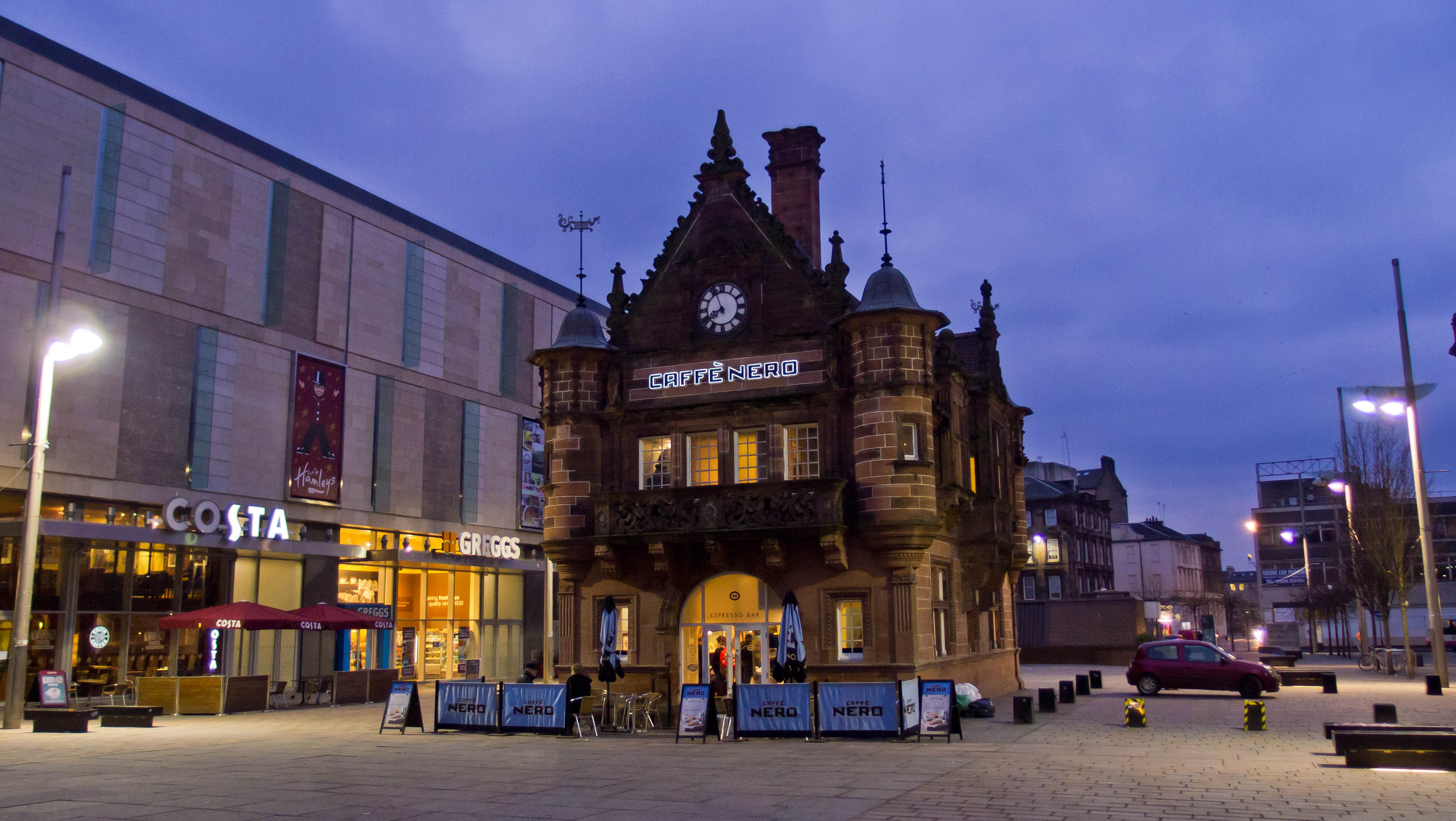
The former station building, now a coffee shop

Above ground, the original station building housed both a booking office and the headquarters of the original Glasgow District Subway Railway Company. This was (and is) the subway's most distinctive building – an ornate, Flemish Renaissance, late-Victorian red sandstone structure; designed by James Miller in 1896.

St Enoch is one of two stations on the Subway that was completely rebuilt from scratch (the other being Partick) during the late 1970s modernisation. Although the original surface building was retained, it would not form part of the new facility, but due to its listed status meant it could not be demolished. To facilitate its preservation, the original foundations were removed to allow the construction of a concrete box to house the expanded station and new subterranean ticket hall. To facilitate this, the old building was relocated onto a precast platform supported on the new station's concrete pillars. Memorable images exist from the late 1970s showing the building seemingly perilously sitting on its new foundations with the empty void of the old station underneath.

Following the modernisation, the old building became a travel information centre for SPT. The building became disused with the travel centre facilities being moved to the underground ticket hall in 2008. In December 2009, a Caffè Nero coffee shop was established in the building. It is now protected as a category A listed building.

== Accessibility ==
St Enoch is the only station on the system which requires two escalator rides to reach the platforms owing to its deep location. Along with Govan subway station, it is one of two Glasgow Subway stations that is wheelchair accessible.

== Refurbishment (2010s) ==
As part of the wider refurbishment of the city's subway, St Enoch station received new glass canopies for each entrance, and an overhaul of the ticket hall.

== Past passenger numbers ==
- 2011/12: 1.857 million annually

== Gallery ==
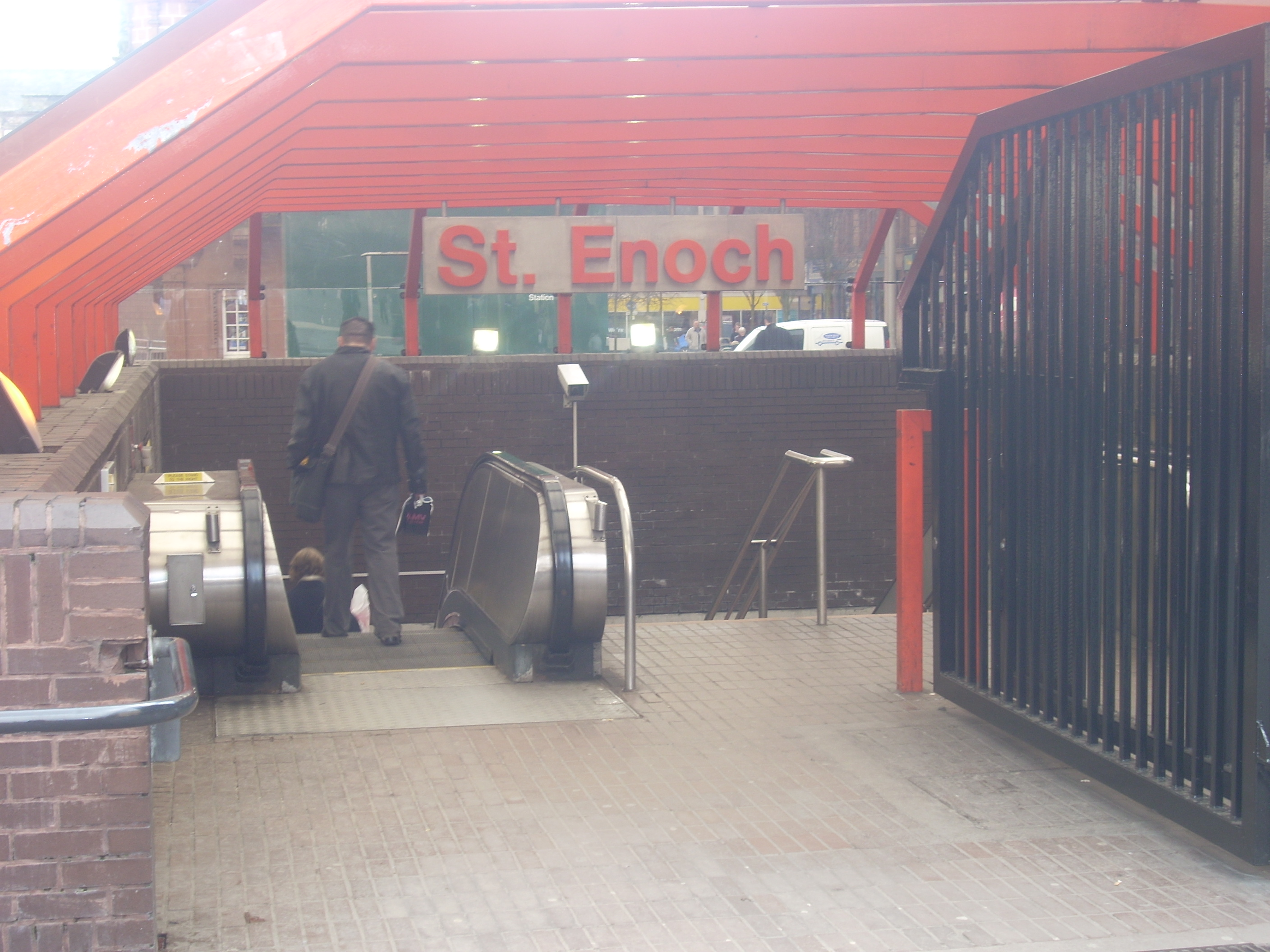
St Enoch station entrance in 2008, prior to modernisation

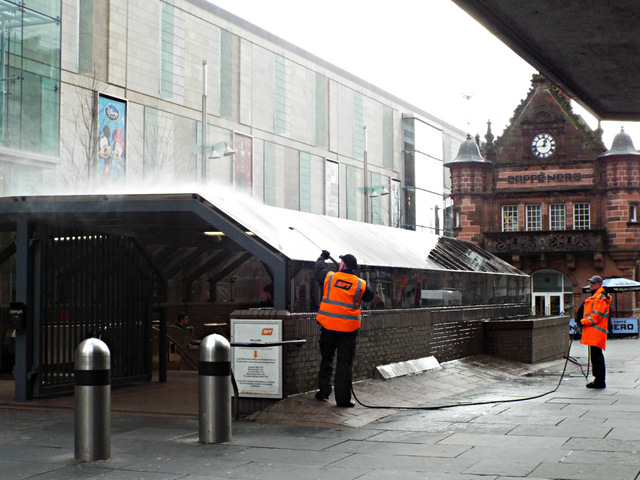
Station entrance prior to new canopy

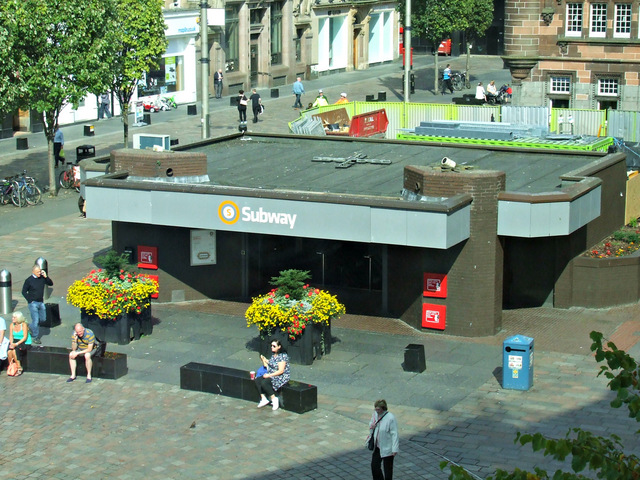
Old exterior

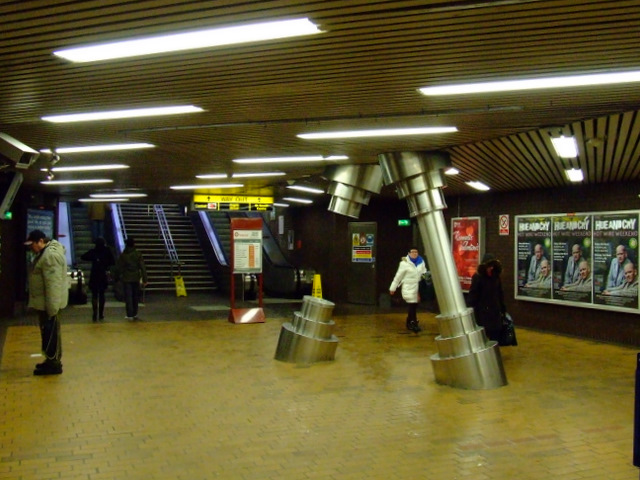
Ticket hall prior to refurbishment

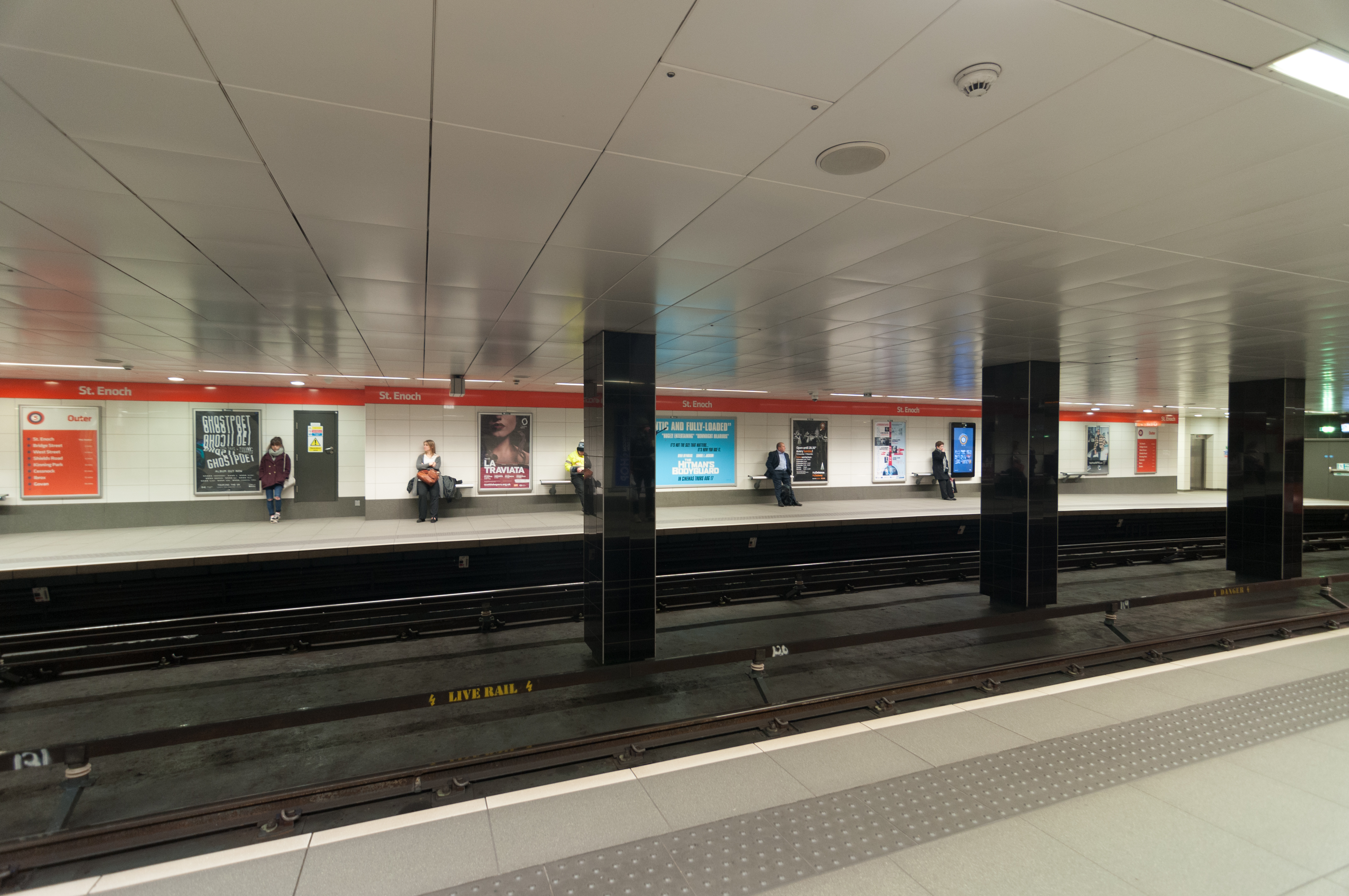
The outer circle platform in 2017
