= Partick =

Area of Glasgow, Scotland

Coordinates: 55°52′17″N 4°18′31″W

Partick: Scottish Gaelic: Partaig; Scots: Pairtick
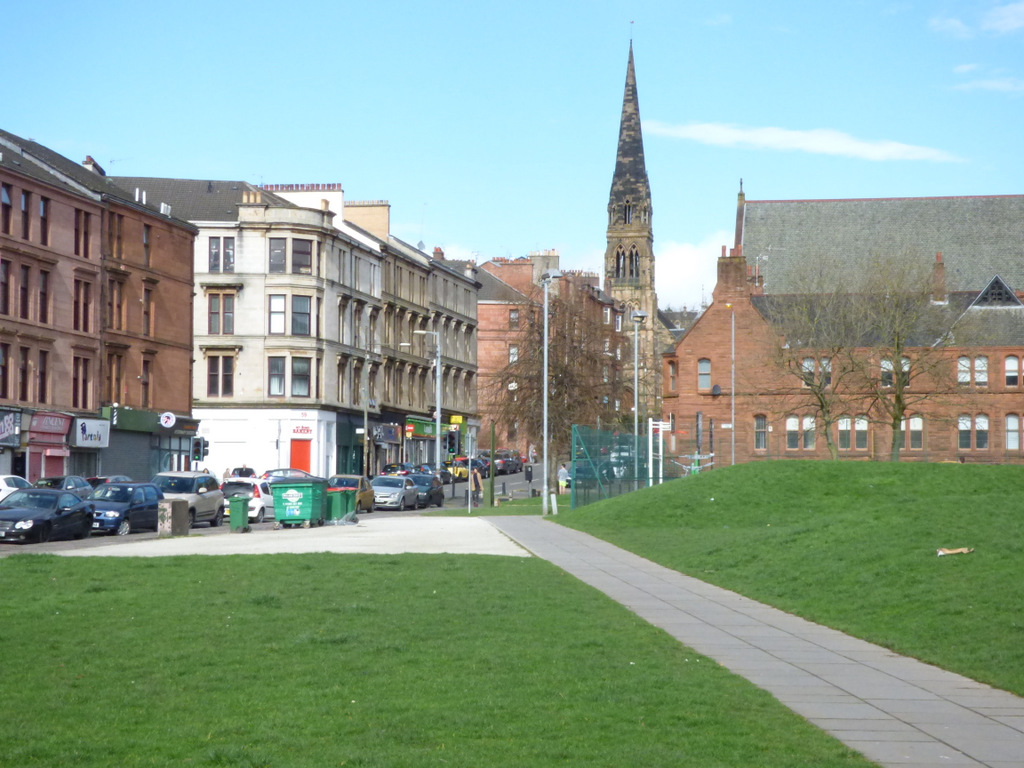
- Mansfield Park

- Location within Glasgow
- Area: 0.85 km^{2} (0.33 sq mi)
- Population: 8,884 (2015)
  - Density: 10,452/km^{2} (27,070/sq mi)
- OS grid reference: NS554665
- Council area: Glasgow City Council
- Lieutenancy area: Glasgow
- Country: Scotland
- Sovereign state: United Kingdom
- Post town: GLASGOW
- Postcode district: G11
- Dialling code: 0141
- Police: Scotland
- Fire: Scottish
- Ambulance: Scottish
- UK Parliament: Glasgow West
- Scottish Parliament: Glasgow Kelvin

Partick (Scottish Gaelic: Partaig, originally Pearraig; Scots: Pairtick) is an area of Glasgow on the north bank of the River Clyde, just across from Govan. To the west lies Whiteinch, to the east Yorkhill and Kelvingrove Park (across the River Kelvin), and to the north Broomhill, Hyndland, Dowanhill, Hillhead, areas which form part of the West End of Glasgow.

It was a Police burgh from 1852 until 1912 when it was incorporated into the city. Partick is the area of the city most connected with the Highlands, and several Gaelic agencies, such as the Gaelic Books Council (Scottish Gaelic: Comhairle nan Leabhraichean) are located in the area. Some ATMs in the area display Gaelic.

Partick is culturally significant as the location of the first international football match played by Scotland and England at Hamilton Crescent in 1872.

== Etymology ==
The modern name derives from the ancient Cumbric Peartoc (as in the modern Welsh word perth, meaning "bush or thicket").

The Cumbric name had earlier been adopted into Scottish Gaelic as Pearthaig or Pearraig, used in the expression cho luath ri muileann Phearthaig - as fast as lightning, literally as fast as a Partick mill. The more common modern Gaelic name for the place is Partaig and derives from the English name, not the original Gaelic name. Older anglicised forms include Perdyc and Perthick.

== History ==
Although Partick remained a village until the middle of the 18th century, it is an ancient place. The Kings of Strathclyde had a residence there, and in 1136 David I (1124–1153) granted the lands of Perdyc to the see of Glasgow. The Bishops of Glasgow had a country seat in Partick. It was later the site of Partick Castle, a country home of George Hutcheson (demolished 1836). The burgh, which had its headquarters at Partick Burgh Hall, was annexed by Glasgow in 1912.

== Geography ==
=== Locality ===
It is historically divided into three social areas; south of Dumbarton Road, north of Dumbarton Road and the Partick Hill grand villas. Being within the sphere of influence of the University of Glasgow and neighbouring Glasgow's salubrious "West End" it has a high student population. Traditional industries for the area were shipbuilding and the huge Meadowside Granary (recently demolished to make way for the new Glasgow Harbour residential development) employed many residents also. The main street in Partick, Dumbarton Road, has a number of services for residents to use.

=== Community ===
Partick Burgh Hall is a venue (much like a community centre) located within Partick. It regularly holds community events and is owned and managed by Culture & Sport Glasgow (part of Glasgow City Council). The hall was originally built in 1872 and has multiple rooms. The hall is staffed in order to accommodate events and to handle security. Private events are also held in the hall.

Partick Community Council is an organization which exists in the area to deal with issues within the community. It is the oldest community group in Partick and consists of around twenty elected members. The boundary of this council runs from Byres Road to Crow Road and from the River Clyde to Highburgh Road. The council is funded by Glasgow City Council by way of an annual grant.

Examples of activities of the Community Council include:

- Neighbourhood Watch coordination.
- Lobbying of Glasgow City Council
- Promoting cleanliness and security in the area

== Demography and culture ==
=== Sport ===
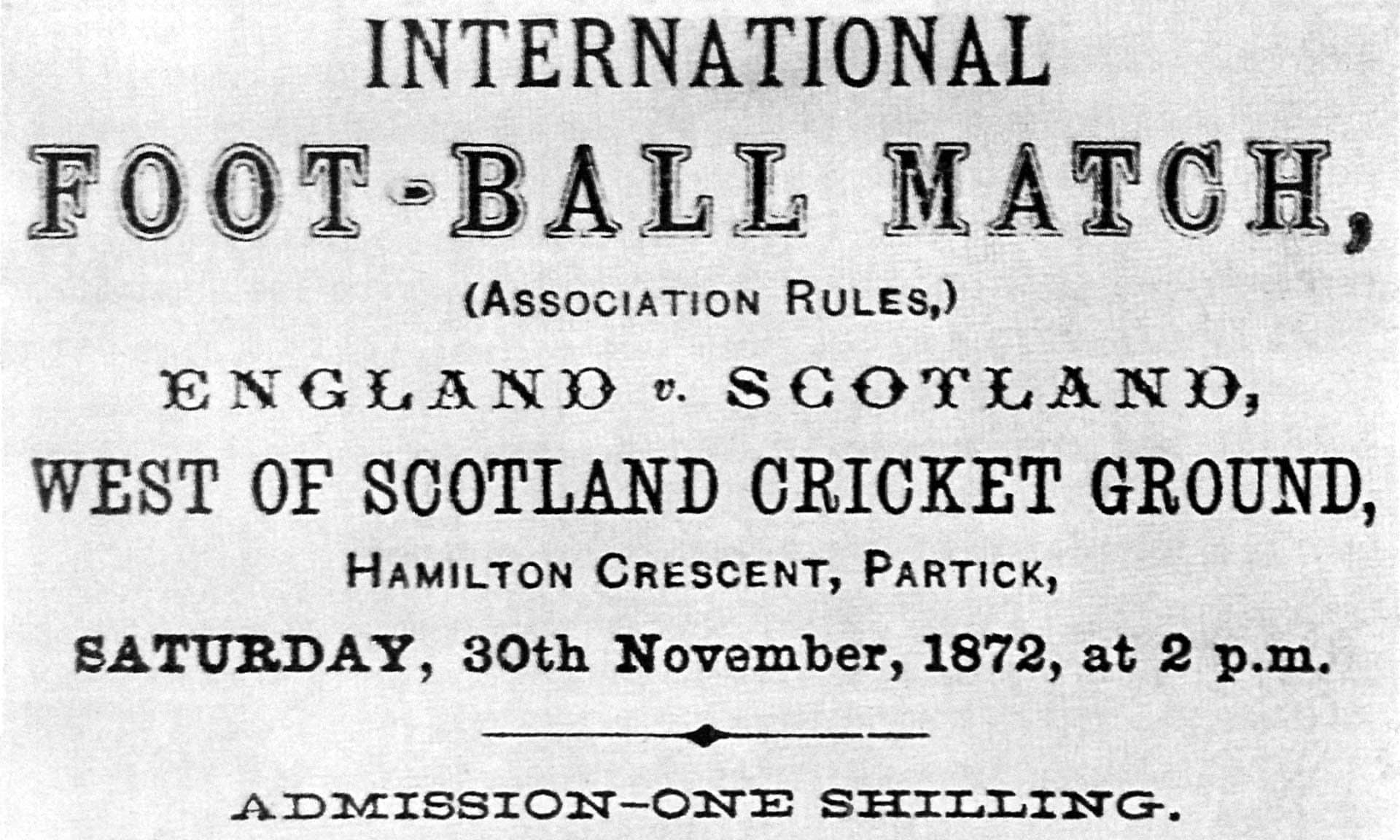
Advertisement for the first ever international football match

Partick is home to the West of Scotland Cricket Club's Hamilton Crescent ground, which was the site of the first ever international football match (between Scotland and England) on 30 November 1872.

Partick Thistle Football Club were formed in the area in 1876, but left to play in the Maryhill area of Glasgow in 1909. Partick F.C. were also active in the 1870s and 1880s.

=== Transport ===
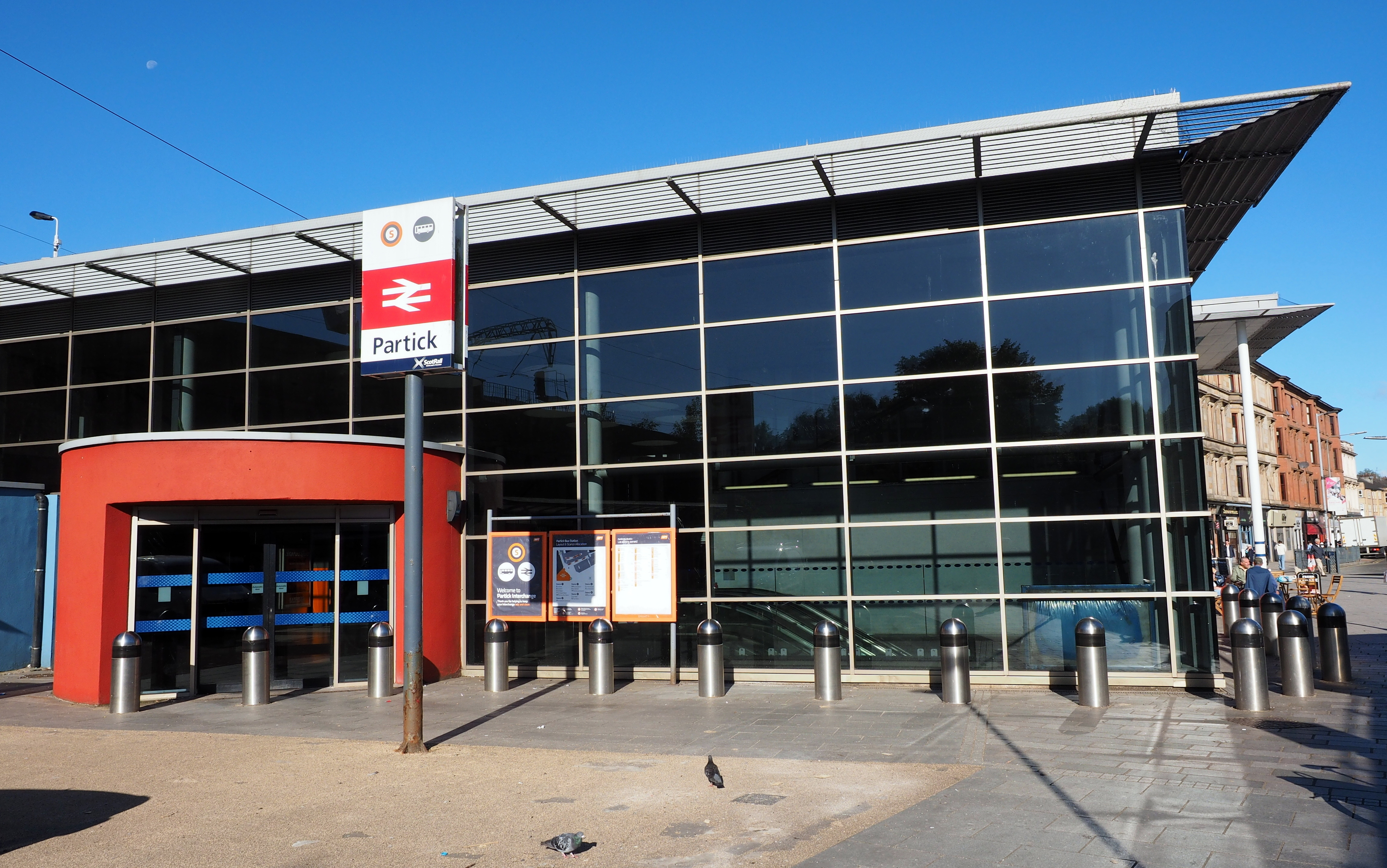
Exterior of Partick railway station

Partick station is a trunk station serving as an interchange between the local rail, Glasgow Subway and local bus systems. It replaced the former Partickhill railway station in 1979. There were previously three other stations in the area, Partick Central railway station (renamed Kelvin Hall station in 1959), Merkland Street and Partick West railway station.

The Partick interchange was redeveloped in 2012 due to its immense potential as a top-class interchange not only between Rail, Bus and Subway but also as the main interchange station between the Argyle and North Clyde rail lines.

=== Religion ===
There is an old Quaker burial ground, the 'Quakers Graveyard', situated at the bottom of Keith Street. Now a visitors' attraction the graveyard was given over to the city of Glasgow. It was last used in 1857. Purdon Street, which runs parallel with Keith Street, was named after John Purdon, a prominent Quaker who lived in Partick in the 17th century. His wife is buried in the graveyard.

The local Church of Scotland congregation is served by Partick South Parish Church and Partick Trinity Church.

Partick's Catholic community is served by St Peter's church situated in Hyndland Street. St Simon's church, located in Bridge Street, was built in 1858 and is the third oldest Catholic church in Glasgow. An arson attack in 2021 left it a ruin with only the external walls remaining. The arsonist, Ryan Haggerty, was sentenced for five years and three months in October 2022.

=== Partick Film Festival ===
Partick Film Festival takes place in unique venues across Partick, including Partick Library, The Annexe and the Kelvin Hall. The festival hosts film screenings, masterclasses and talks by Film & TV professionals.

== Notable people ==
- Charles Morton Aikman, 19C scientist
- Thomas Octavius Callender, electrical engineer
- Liz Cameron, former Lord Provost of Glasgow
- Stuart Christie, anarchist
- Billy Connolly, lived on White Street and Stewartville Street during his childhood and attended St Peter's Boys School.
- Martin Dougan, television presenter
- Jane Gemmill, temperance activist
- Rachel Hamilton, special constable
- Helen Holm, golfer
- Jimmy Lawrence, footballer
- Fred McDermid, politician
- Garry McDowall, footballer
- Pat McGinlay, footballer
- Tosh McKinlay, footballer
- Joseph Andrew Mclean, producer
- Bud Neill, cartoonist
