= Glasgow Subway =

Underground rapid transit line in Glasgow, Scotland

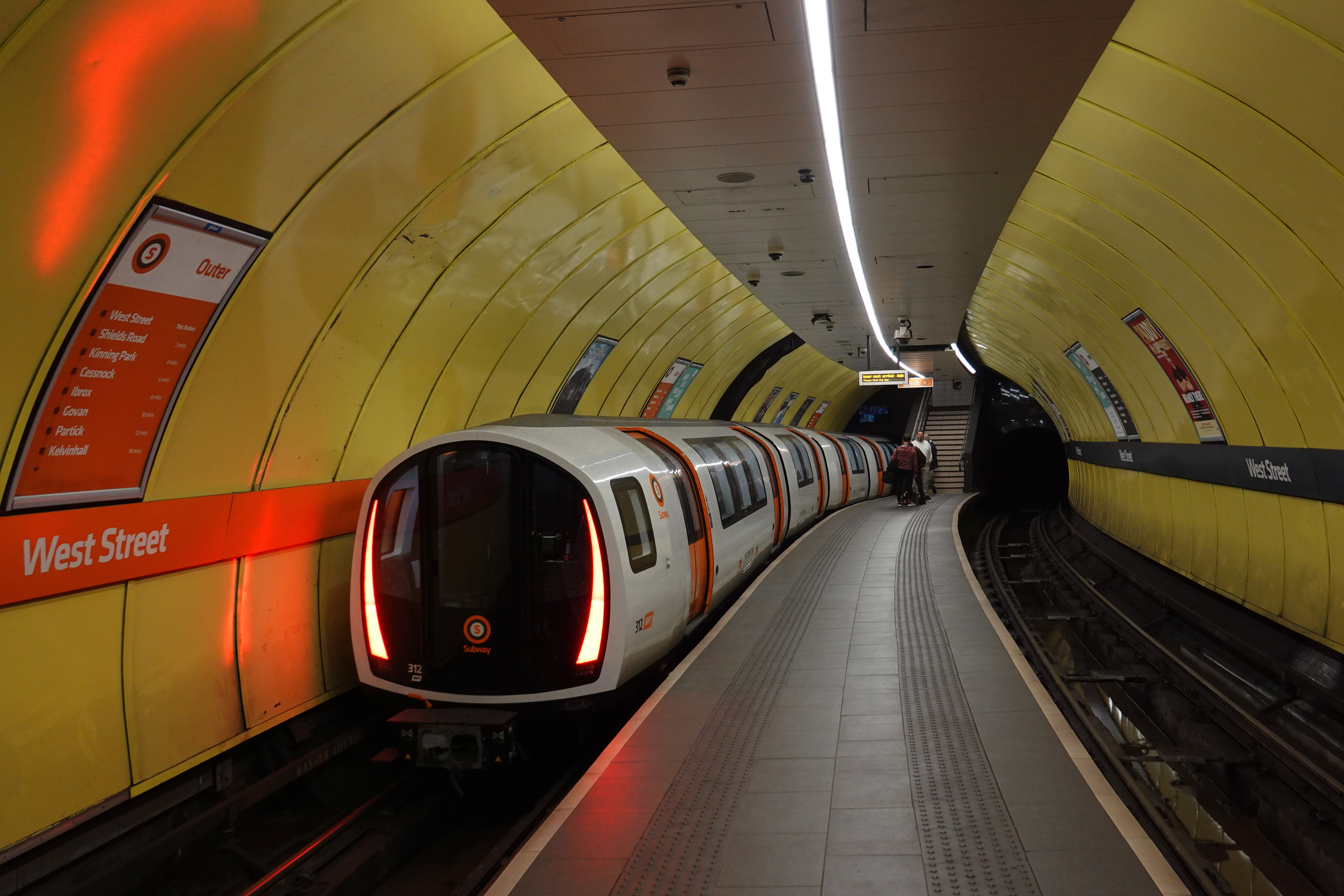
- A train on the Glasgow Subway

Overview
- Native name: Fo-rèile Ghlaschu
- Locale: Glasgow, Scotland
- Transit type: Light metro
- Number of lines: 2
- Number of stations: 15
- Annual ridership: 13 million (2024/25)
- Website: Official website

Operation
- Began operation: 14 December 1896; 129 years ago
- Operator: Strathclyde Partnership for Transport

Technical
- System length: 6 1/2 mi (10.5 km)
- Track gauge: 4 ft (1,219 mm) narrow gauge
- Electrification: Third rail, 600 V DC

The Glasgow Subway (Scottish Gaelic: Fo-rèile Ghlaschu, lit. 'Glasgow under-rail') is an underground light metro system in Glasgow, Scotland. Opened on 14 December 1896, it is the third-oldest underground metro system in the world; after the Metropolitan Railway in London (1863) and the Budapest Metro (1896). It is also one of the very few railways in the world with a track running gauge of 4 ft (1,219 mm). Originally a cable railway, the subway was later electrified, but the double-track circular line has never been expanded. The line was originally known as the Glasgow District Subway, and was thus the first mass transit system to be known as a "subway"; it was later renamed Glasgow Subway Railway. In 1936 it was renamed the Glasgow Underground, though many Glaswegians continued to refer to the network as "the Subway". In 2003, the name "Subway" was officially readopted by its operator, Strathclyde Partnership for Transport (SPT).

The system is not the oldest underground railway in Glasgow: that distinction belongs to a three-mile (five-kilometre) section of the Glasgow City and District Railway opened in 1886, now part of the North Clyde Line of the suburban railway network, which runs in a tunnel under the city centre between High Street and west of Charing Cross. Another major section of underground suburban railway line in Glasgow is the Argyle Line, which was formerly part of the Glasgow Central Railway.

== Route ==
The subway system was constructed as a circular loop almost 6 1/2 miles (10.5 kilometres) long and extends both north and south of the River Clyde. The tracks have the unusual narrow gauge of 4 ft (1,219 mm) and a nominal tunnel diameter of 11 ft (3.4 m), even smaller than that of the deep-level lines of the London Underground (11 ft 8 1/4 in or 3.56 m at their smallest); consequently, the rolling stock for the Glasgow Subway is considerably smaller.

The system is described as two lines, the Outer Circle and Inner Circle, which simply refers to the double track, having trains running clockwise and anticlockwise respectively around the same route in separate tunnels. Stations use a variety of platform layouts including single island platforms, opposing side platforms and in some stations such as Hillhead one side and one island platform.

The subway's running lines are entirely underground, although the maintenance depot at Broomloan Road (located between the Govan and Ibrox stations) is above ground, as was the earlier depot, also at Govan. Prior to modernisation, trains used to be lifted by crane onto and off the tracks for maintenance every ten days. When not running the trains were parked in the tunnels flanking the car sheds. Modernisation brought the installation of points and an access ramp between Govan and Ibrox where trains can exit the tunnel system for maintenance, cleaning, or storage.

Power is supplied to the trains at 600 V DC, using a third rail, via sub-stations at five locations on the circle: Broomloan Depot, Byres Road (Hillhead), Dundasvale (Cowcaddens), Bridge Street and Cornwall Street (Kinning Park). In the event of maintenance or repair work, the system can operate a full service (six trains per circle) with one of the sub-stations inoperative.

The system is owned and operated by the Strathclyde Partnership for Transport (SPT), formerly Strathclyde Passenger Transport, and carried 12.7 million passengers in the period 2019–20. The Subway has been policed by British Transport Police since 2007.

== History ==
=== 1890–1977 ===
Glasgow District Subway Act 1890
- Act of Parliament
- Parliament of the United Kingdom
- Long title: An Act for making Subways in the city and suburbs of Glasgow; and for other purposes.
- Citation: 53 & 54 Vict. c. clxii

Dates
- Royal assent: 4 August 1890
Other legislation
Repealed by	Glasgow Corporation Consolidation (Water, Transport and Markets) Order Confirmation Act 1964

Status: Repealed

Text of statute as originally enacted

The Glasgow District Subway Company was incorporated by the Glasgow District Subway Act 1890 (53 & 54 Vict. c. clxii), and began construction of the underground in 1891. It opened on 14 December 1896. The subway was powered by a clutch-and-cable system, with one cable for each direction.

The cable was driven from a steam-powered plant between West Street and Shields Road stations. There was no additional cable to allow trains to reach the depot; instead, they were transferred to and from the running lines by crane operating over a pit at the Govan workshops. This also meant that the two tracks could be completely separate, with no points anywhere. The company's headquarters were in the upper rooms at St Enoch subway station; this distinctive ornate building still stands in St Enoch Square and was subsequently used as a travel information office by SPT and is now a coffee shop.

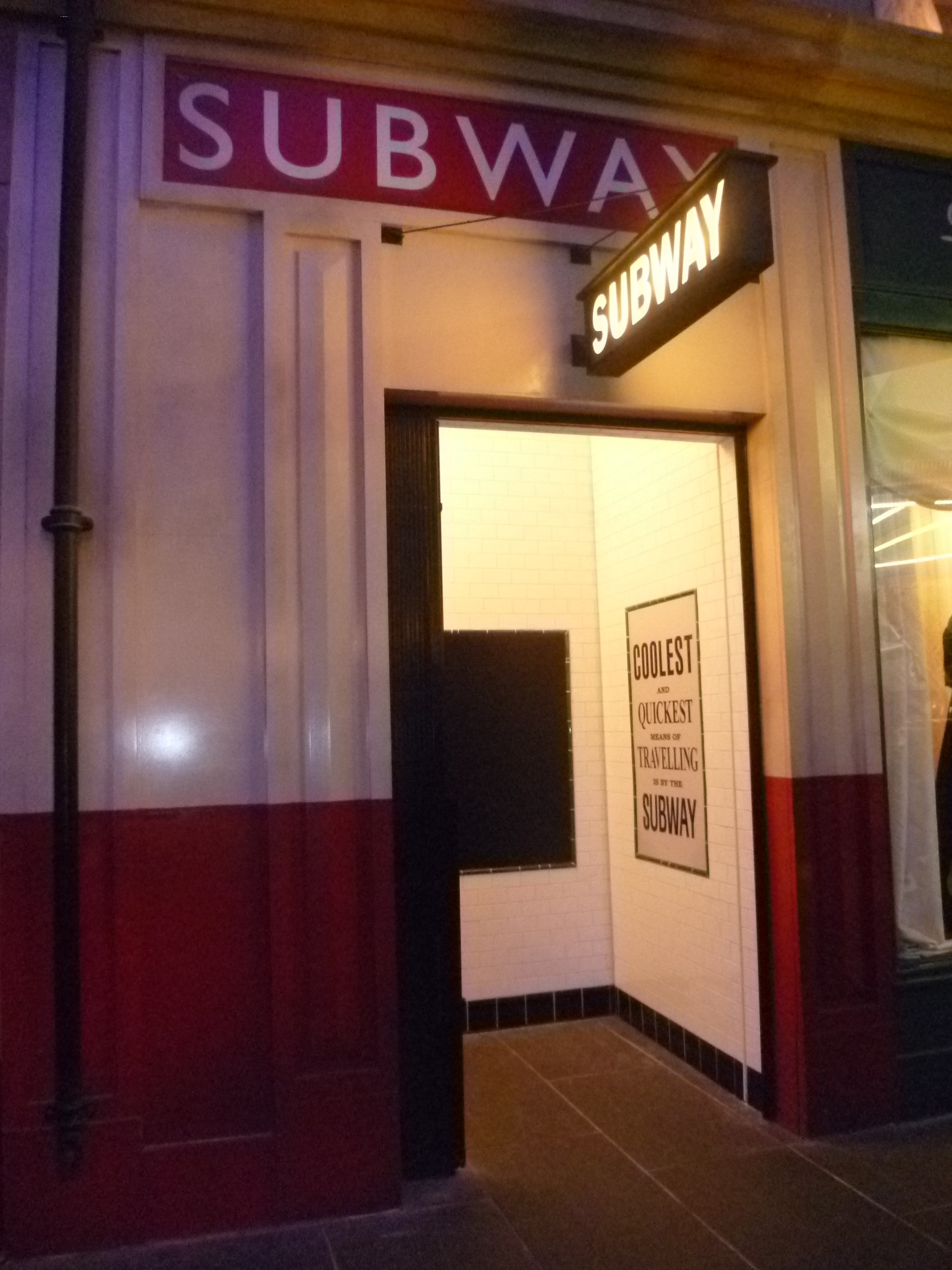
Recreated Glasgow Subway station entrance at the Riverside Museum

When the Subway first opened, single-carriage four axle (twin truck) trains were operated. Late in the evening on the opening day, after 11 pm, one car laden with 60 passengers was run into by another under the River Clyde. Four people were injured, one being taken to the infirmary. This entailed the closure of the Subway until 19 January 1897. The 20 original wooden bodied carriages were built by the Oldbury Railway Carriage and Wagon Company, of Oldbury, Worcestershire. Many continued in service until 1977 in an upgraded form. A further 10 were delivered by the same manufacturer in 1897. From 1898, second four axle (trailer) carriages without a cable gripper mechanism were added, though they were considerably shorter than the front (gripper) carriage. These additional carriages, eventually numbering 30, were built by Hurst Nelson & Company, Motherwell, Lanarkshire. These carriages were soon expanded to match the length of the front carriages, although carriage 41T has been restored to its original length and cut longitudinally and number 39T is preserved in the Riverside Museum. Most of the gripper carriages were subsequently converted to electric traction in 1935. All carriages were originally built with lattice gates (instead of doors) at the ends; many were converted to air-operated sliding doors in the 1960s, but a few retained the gates until 1977.

All 15 stations were built with island platforms. The trains were thus built with doors on one side only. Power for the electric lighting in the trains was supplied by two parallel wall-mounted rails (known as "T-irons") at window level on the non-platform side of the trains; trains were originally equipped with wheels to pick up the electricity but changed to skids at electrification. The trains remained cable-hauled until 1935, though the anachronistic way of supplying power for the lighting continued until 1977. The lighting circuit was also part of the operation of the signalling system.

Opening times of the Glasgow Subway have varied through the years, now open 06:30 to 23:40 Monday to Saturday and 10:00 to 18:12 on Sunday following a trial period between April 2011 and 2012 when the subway was open from 09:00–18:30.

Glasgow Corporation took over the company in 1923 at a cost of £385,000 (equivalent to £20,100,000 in 2025). In 1935, the existing trains were converted to electric power delivered by a third rail at 600 volts, direct current. From March until December 1935, clockwise trains were cable-hauled, while anti-clockwise ones were electric. The conversion to electric traction cost £120,000 (equivalent to £7,400,000 in 2025). The last cable drawn car service was on 30 November 1935, and was driven by Robert Boyd.

The trains lost their original plum and cream-coloured liveries, being painted red and white instead. From the 1950s the trains became all red—in a shade similar to that of London buses. During the early 1970s, trailer carriage number 41 was repainted in the original 1896 livery.

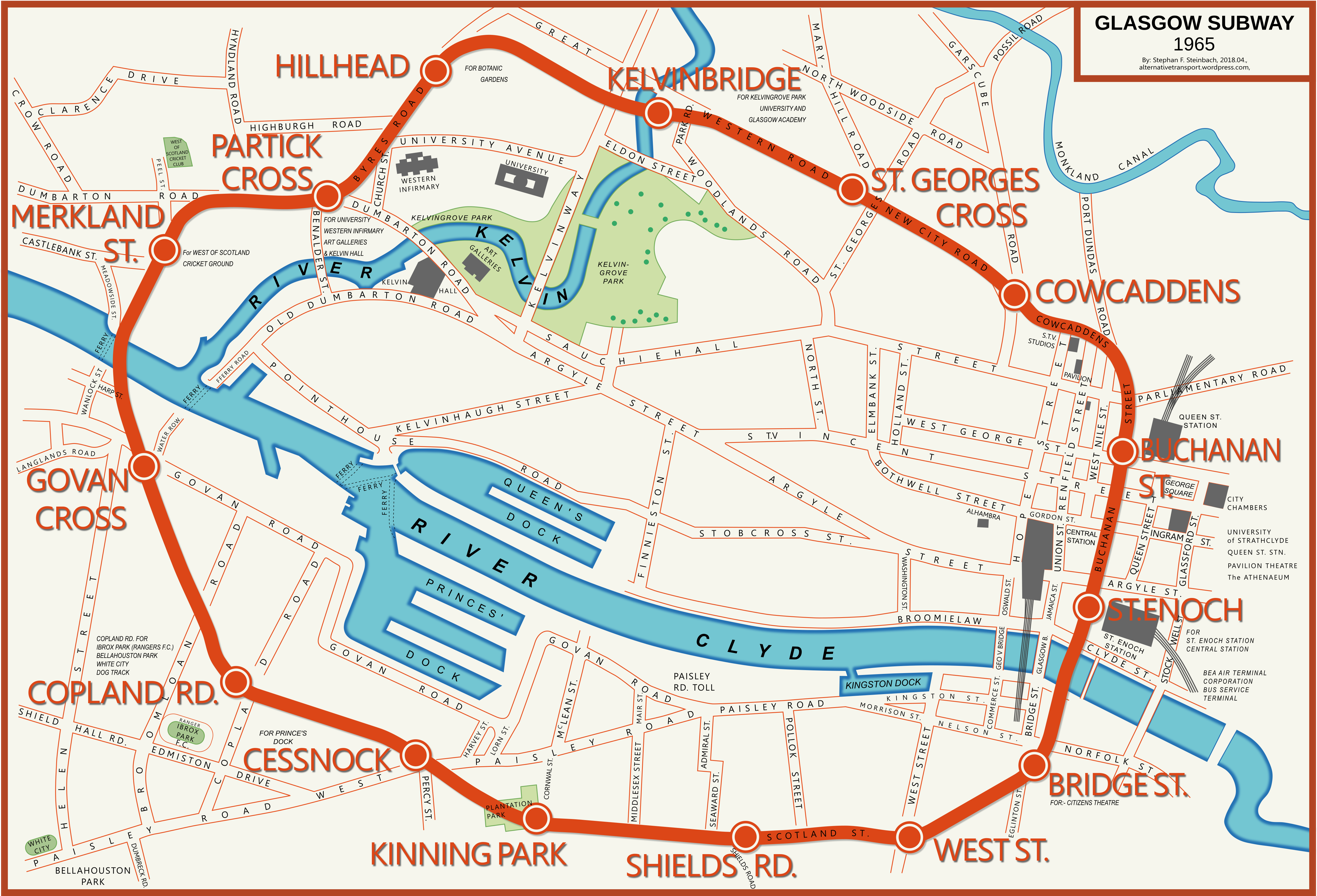
Glasgow Subway before the Beeching cuts

According to Keith Anderson World War II brought an "unprecedented" level of use by passengers. Anderson attributes this, and an increase in patronage in the years leading up to the conflict, to the expansion of the local shipyard workforce due to the need for rearmament. Unlike its larger counterpart in London the system's stations did not make good air-raid shelters as they were much less deep. On 18 September 1940, during World War II, a German bomb, which dropped during a night raid on Glasgow and may have been intended for nearby naval facilities, landed on a bowling green to the south of Merkland Street station. The resulting explosion caused damage to both tunnels, leading to closure of part of the system until repairs were completed in January 1941. The system suffered no other damage during the conflict. It did lose staff who were called up to participate in the war effort.

After the Beeching Axe of the 1960s, both St Enoch and Buchanan Street mainline stations were closed and demolished; there was no direct connection between the underground and mainline stations of Buchanan Street as they were over 500 m (550 yd) distant. The Subway had no direct passenger connection to the national railway network—a major weakness—although Buchanan Street and Merkland Street stations were a short walk from Queen Street and Partickhill British Rail stations respectively.

The trains (mostly dating back to 1896) were always formed with two carriages—the front (motor) carriage with red leather seats and the rear (trailer) carriage with brown leather seats. Smoking was permitted in the rear carriage only. The backs of the seats were attached to the sides of the carriages, which moved semi-independently from the floor (to which the seats themselves were attached); passengers were rocked forward and backward while the carriage 'shoogled' them around. Passengers always entered at the middle of the train ("Q Here" signs were painted on the platforms), leaving by the front door of the front carriage or the rear door of the rear carriage.

By the 1970s, the stations were very dilapidated. Surface access to most stations had been largely built into existing buildings and their entrances often formed part of shop frontages (Kelvinhall being the only surviving example of this in the post-modernised era), and with many of these structures being destroyed during the slum clearances of the 1960s, often only the station access was left standing. Stations were marked with circular signs often attached to lampposts. This sign had a white background in the top three-quarters (containing a large red letter "U") and black in the bottom quarter (containing the word "Underground" and an arrow to the station entrance). No station had an escalator; Kelvinbridge had a lift. Each station had a ticket office (often very small, little more than a booth with a window). The ticketing system was identical to that of most cinemas of the era, with tickets emerging from slots in the counters of the station ticket offices (the words "Control Systems Ltd" or "Automaticket Ltd" were printed on all tickets). Tickets were invariably collected on leaving the train. From the time of being taken over by the Corporation until 1977, the staff were issued with tramway uniforms; these were dark green and had a black braid on the cuffs which had been introduced at the time of the funeral of Queen Victoria in 1901.

The Glasgow Museum of Transport had an area dedicated to the subway, with models showing the operation of the clutch-and-cable system, as well as a full-scale replica of part of a subway station, complete with different rolling stock of the pre-modernisation era.

=== Modernisation (1977–1980) ===
By the 1970s, use of the Subway had declined significantly. This was caused partly by the closure of some of the dockyards and by widescale demolition of tenements south of the River Clyde. The original carriages, mostly dating back to 1896, were still in use, though adapted for electric traction in 1935. Breakdowns were becoming increasingly frequent; because trains could only be removed from the tracks to the depot by crane, a single inoperable train could cause major delays. The future of the Subway became a major issue for the Greater Glasgow Passenger Transport Executive (GGPTE), which took over responsibility for the line from Glasgow Corporation in the early 1970s. In January 1974 GGPTE announced a modernisation programme would be undertaken. The original plan would have seen trains continue to run on the system, with one of the two circles continuing to run while the other was upgraded. This idea was abandoned as expert advice suggested a safety risk.

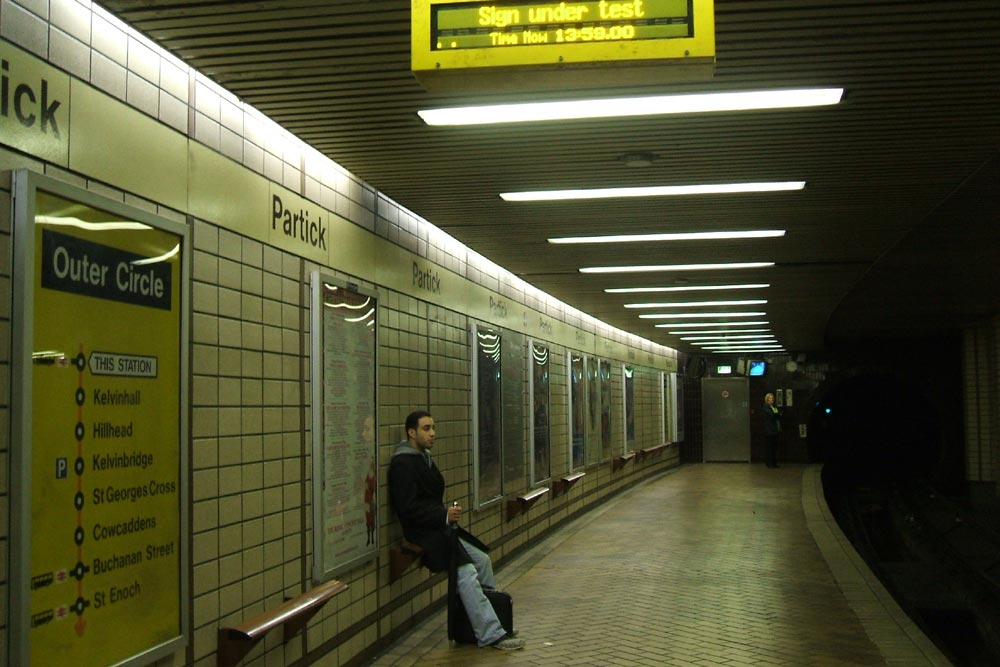
Partick station

On 24 March 1977, cracks were noticed in the roof of Govan Cross station, leading to suspension of services until 2 May. The service resumed with only four trains per circle. On 21 May 1977, the system was shut down eight days prematurely for a major refurbishment and modernisation; the date was brought forward because of the appearance of more cracks in the Govan Cross roof. Badly deteriorated tunnels were repaired; stations were rebuilt and enlarged, with additional platforms at Buchanan Street, Partick, Govan, Ibrox, Hillhead and St Enoch. The surface building of St George's Cross had already been rebuilt in 1971 as part of the construction of the Glasgow Inner Ring Road, and therefore was merely re-clad in the new corporate style. The entrance to Kelvinbridge was reversed, with a new entrance and car park built at South Woodside Road, an escalator to Great Western Road and stairs down to the west end of the platform; the former entrance and stairway at the east end became an emergency exit, and the lift was withdrawn from service. Merkland Street station was closed (thus becoming a ghost station); a new station to the north was built at Partick to provide an interchange with the North Clyde Line of the suburban rail system. The site of Merkland Street can be noticed by the characteristic hump and the larger-diameter tunnel with both tracks. Many fittings from Merkland Street were used to build a replica pre-modernisation station at the Glasgow Museum of Transport which contained three preserved cars.

A further interchange via moving walkway was installed between Buchanan Street station and Queen Street mainline station as part of the modernisation.

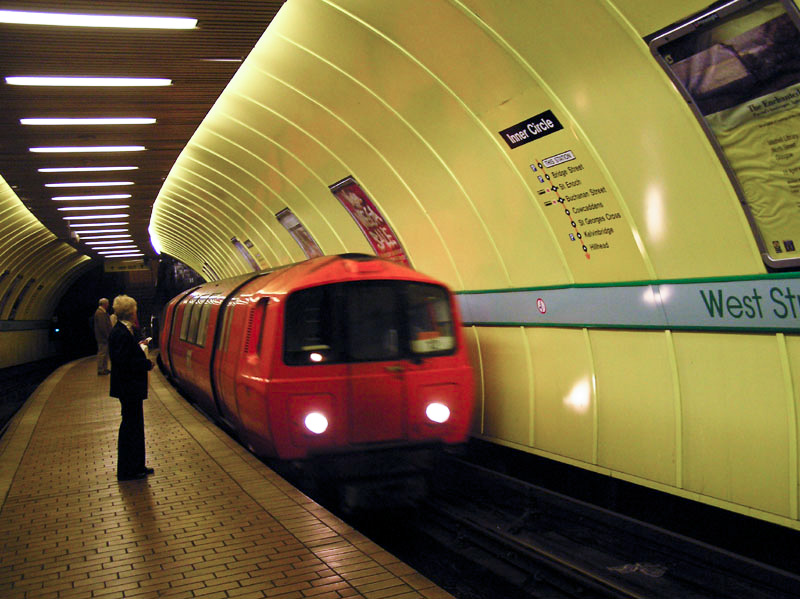
An Inner Circle train arrives at West Street, 2004

In August 1977, all redundant fittings and equipment from the old system were sold at a public sale at Broomloan Works. During the 1977–1980 modernisation, two Clayton battery locomotives were used by the contractors Taylor Woodrow to haul construction trains.

Heavier track was installed although still at the unique 4 ft (1,219 mm) gauge, the original Broomloan Depot was modernised and equipped with connecting tracks with points to replace the crane transfer, and a new electrical supply from Westinghouse Electric Corporation was installed. A new ticketing system, provided by Crouzet, with passenger-operated ticket vending machines and automatic turnstile barriers, replaced the old, perforated cinema-style tickets and conductors. The post-1980 yellow tickets have since been replaced by a newer system, issuing magnetic stripe card tickets.

The modernised system uses automatic train operation with the driver only responsible for closing the doors and pressing a "start" button in normal operation.

While the system was closed a replacement bus service was introduced by GGPTE in a bid to retain customers. Service 66 covered the inner circle route, while service 99 covered the route taken by the outer circle.

==== Since modernisation ====
Map of the Glasgow Subway

The modernised Subway (alongside the rebuilt Argyle Line) was inaugurated on 1 November 1979 by Queen Elizabeth II, who rode the train along with Prince Philip from Buchanan Street to St Enoch. Rebuilding work was however still incomplete, and the actual reopening to passengers did not occur until 16 April 1980. Thirty-three new carriages were built by Metro-Cammell at its Washwood Heath works in Birmingham, and equipped with GEC electric motors. The exterior design of the trains was carried out in partnership with Glasgow School of Art, which, according to SPT publicity films of the day, was largely responsible for the trains' "cute" appearance. Eight additional centre-trailer carriages were built in 1992 (the body shells by Hunslet Gyro Mining Transport in Leeds for completion by Hunslet-Barclay in Kilmarnock), making all trains three carriages long. Smoking has never been permitted on the modernised system.

A new corporate identity was introduced (following contemporary fashions of the 1970s), with trains painted bright orange, stations largely rebuilt with dark brown bricks, orange-yellow wall tiles and other surfaces in off-white, plus brown uniforms for the staff. Large, illuminated orange "U" signs were placed at station entrances (since removed, with the re-adoption of the name "Subway"). Since the 1990s, ongoing renovation work has resulted in most stations adopting individual colour schemes. The trains' initial orange livery of 1980 (with a white stripe) was soon replaced by a darker, more durable shade of orange, later being replaced by SPT's carmine-red and cream livery.

The system was resignalled using Vital Processor Interlocking in 1996 and subsequently an upgraded Supervisory & Control System was installed.

=== Further modernisation (2000s–present) ===
A £40,000 study examining the feasibility of an expansion into the city's south side was conducted in 2005, and in 2007 Labour further committed to extend the line to the East End, but to no avail.

New electronic destination signs were installed in the stations in 2008.

The Partick station modernisation project was completed in 2009, and resulted in a complete redevelopment at the station, which hosts a railway station, a subway station and a bus terminal on the outside.

In April 2010, Strathclyde Partnership for Transport approved outline plans for a £290 million upgrade of the Subway—the first since the comprehensive modernisation of the late 1970s. Plans included additional safety measures, improved accessibility and smart technology such as electronic tickets. The proposals were approved by the Scottish Government in March 2011, and changes to be brought in included:

- integrated smartcard ticketing
- new driverless trains
- improved signalling with automation
- refurbishing all subway stations, including making stations more accessible, as well as safer with platform screen doors.

The first station to be modernised was Hillhead. This began in 2011 and finished in 2012. The work included the retiling of all the walls and floors, the replacement of escalators, a new ticket office, better way finding and also a piece of public art.

Further plans were announced to modernise Ibrox and Kelvinhall stations before the 2014 Commonwealth Games in Glasgow. Furthermore, all other stations were planned to receive updated branding prior to modernisation work being carried out on them, so as to achieve unity in design.

In March 2016, Strathclyde Partnership for Transport (SPT) awarded contracts to Stadler and Ansaldo STS for the supply of 17 new driverless trains for the Subway. The first was delivered in May 2019. Testing on the Subway started on 5 December 2021. The first new trains were previously expected to operate in 2022. The first passenger service with the new trains operated on 11 December 2023, with the third generation trains fully replacing the second generation after their withdrawal on 28 June 2024. Contactless payment was introduced in March 2026. The installation of platform screen doors is continuing, with fully operational doors at Partick, Govan and Ibrox by September 2026.

== Future development and Clyde Metro ==
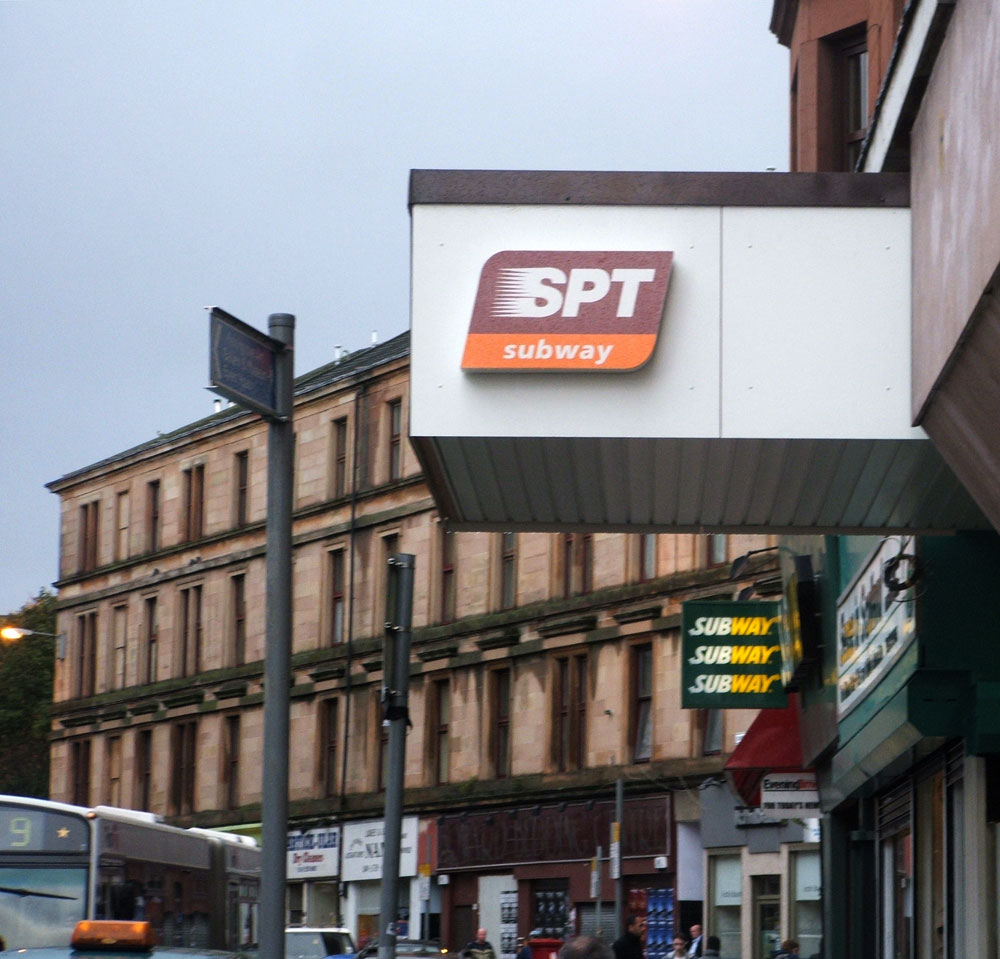
Kelvinhall subway station, showing previous signage

The Glasgow Subway system is the only metro system never to have been expanded from its original route, although a report published in 2018 summarised various extension plans from 1937 onwards.

In early 2005, SPT announced that they would employ consultants to look into extending the system in the West End, East End, South Side and Glasgow Harbour areas of the city. The extension would take advantage of existing unused tunnels underneath the city, and there is a possibility that roads would be dug up to install tunnels before being replaced and resurfaced (cut-and-cover tunnelling).

On 14 March 2007, SPT announced the plans that the consultants had recommended. These included major refurbishment of the existing rolling stock and stations, at an overall cost of £270 million. The expansion of the existing network was also considered at a cost of £2.3 billion, including a new East End Circle, with seven new stations at St Mungo's, Onslow, Duke Street, Celtic Park, Dalmarnock, Newhall and Gorbals. The aim was to improve transport links in an area of the city which is currently poorly served by rail, in the hope that this would aid regeneration, and the city's 2014 Commonwealth Games bid. This circle would interchange at Cowcaddens, Buchanan Street and St Enoch. Other proposals include extending the system southwards to Cathcart and further westwards to the SEC Centre and Maryhill using an older railway line.

In 2007, SPT produced a report that showed huge support for a Subway extension. Councillor Alistair Watson of SPT stated:

We want what you want. This city needs a world-class Subway system. That's what our passengers deserve. I realise an extension won't come cheap and we still have lots of hurdles to overcome but, in my view, what the public wants, the public should get. This is a ringing endorsement from the people who would use the extended Subway.

The plans were expected to take twelve years, but never came to fruition.

Crossrail Glasgow proposals by Glasgow City Council featured a feasibility study conducted by SPT, which included a proposed new West Street railway station which would interface with the West Street station on the Subway network.

Proposed alignment for the Glasgow Airport Rail Link

The Glasgow Connectivity Commission, established by Glasgow City Council in 2017, has also suggested a Glasgow Metro. This would involve repurposing or reopening existing heavy rail lines, the creation of additional light rail metro, and the construction of an airport rail link.

=== Clyde Metro ===
In 2022, Transport Scotland published its final version of the Strategic Transport Projects Review 2, which outlines proposals for the Clyde Metro. The Clyde Metro proposals retain the Subway, and also note the potential for a new station at West Street.

== Connections ==
Before the 1970s modernisation, the Subway offered no formal connections to other transport at ground level, although in practice two stations, Merkland Street and Buchanan Street, were only a short walk from British Rail stations. These links were improved at this modernisation:

- At Partick, the system connects with the North Clyde and Argyle lines of the Glasgow suburban railway network. This was achieved by physically relocating the original railway station at Partickhill, as well as moving and renaming the Merkland Street station.
- A connecting moving walkway, linking Buchanan Street station to Queen Street main-line station.
- Glasgow Central and Argyle Street railway stations (for the Argyle Line) are both a short walk from St Enoch subway station, and most stations connect with bus routes.

== Rolling stock ==
=== First generation (1896–1977) ===
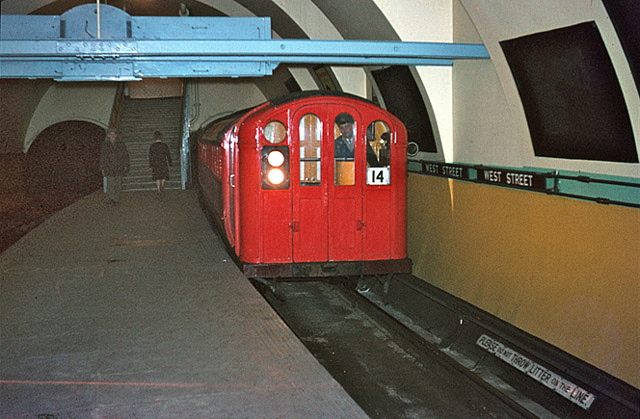
First generation rolling stock, 1966

The first rolling stock was largely built in 1896, with additional trailer carriages added over the following 20 years. This rolling stock was converted from cable to electric traction in 1935 and finally withdrawn from service in 1977 upon the closure of the railway for modernisation.

=== Second generation (1980–2024) ===
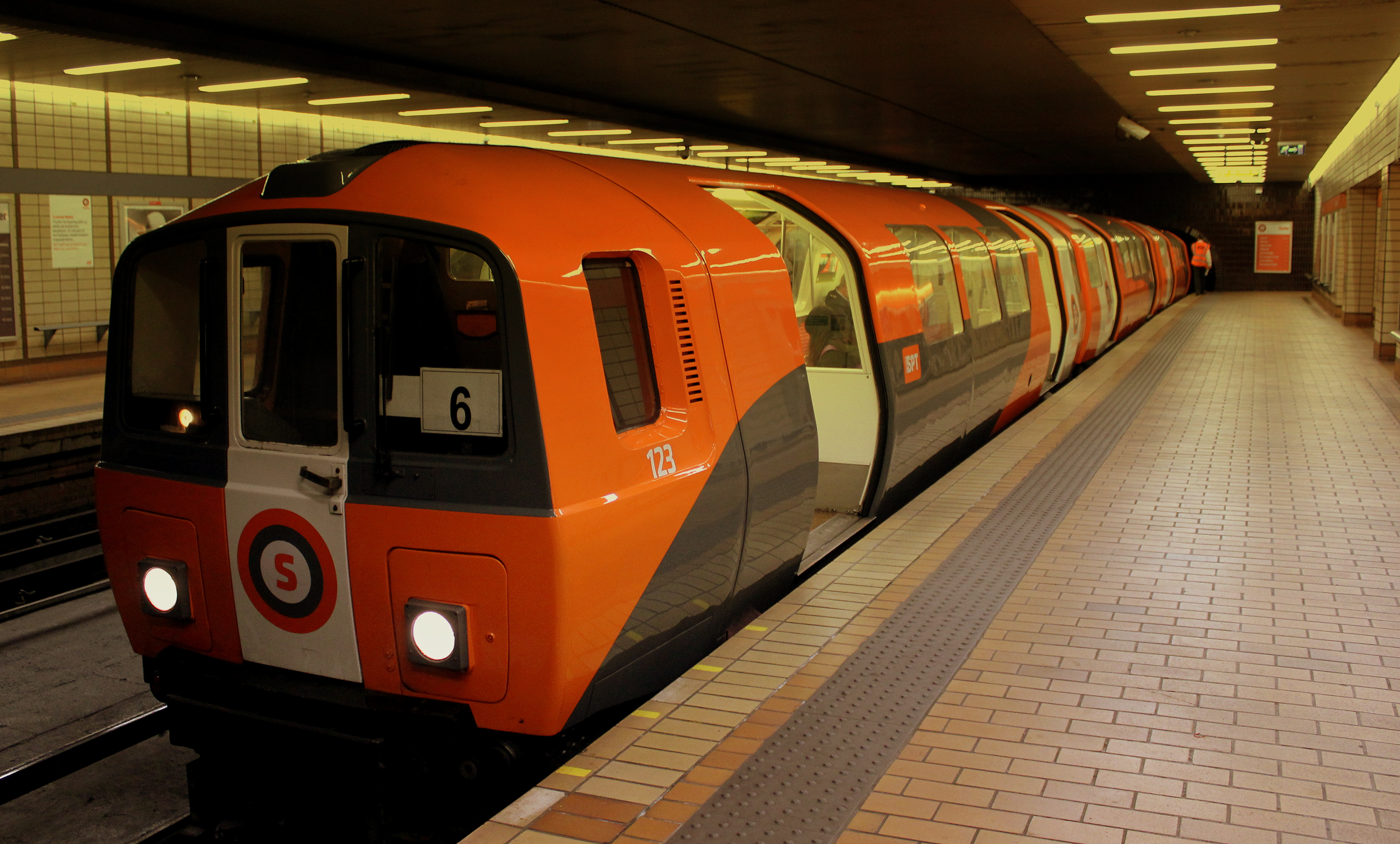
Second generation Metro Cammell rolling stock, 2013

The first 33 cars of the second generation fleet were built by Metro-Cammell in Washwood Heath between 1977 and 1979. Eight additional trailer cars were built in 1992. The rolling stock entered service when the subway re-opened after modernisation work on 16 April 1980. The original 33 were refurbished by ABB at Derby Litchurch Lane Works in 1995. The second generation fleet was entirely retired from service on 28 June 2024.

=== Third generation (2023–present) ===
Third-generation Stadler unit at West Street

Strathclyde Partnership for Transport (SPT) unveiled a £200M contract with Stadler and Ansaldo STS in 2016 for modernisation of the Subway, including new driverless rolling stock. These trains were expected to enter service after the modernisation completed in 2020; however the trains entered passenger service in December 2023. The trains were built by Stadler Rail at their factory in Altenrhein in eastern Switzerland.

== Fares and ticketing ==
A new ITSO paper 'disposable' smartcard Subway ticket, with rebranding compared to old style magnetic strip paper ticket

The Glasgow Subway uses a flat-fare structure rather than a distance-based fare structure. A ticket allows passengers to stay on the Subway for as long as they like.

Tickets are sold as paper tickets, or electronically on a Subway Smartcard. Smartcard ticket prices are discounted slightly from paper ticket prices, and feature a daily cap lower than the paper return ticket and significantly cheaper than the paper all-day ticket. A smartcard is required for any form of season ticket (seven days, four weeks, six months or one year).

Smartcards cost £5, and can be ordered online or obtained from stations. The cards obtained at stations are anonymous Smartcards.

All tickets are available at any station either through a machine or at the ticket office. Tickets must be 'tapped' on the card reader to be validated and must be retained for exit.

SPT's Zonecard is also valid on the Subway as long as it is valid in zone 1.

The concession fare is for disabled or elderly individuals who are holders of a National Entitlement Card that has been issued by SPT.

In early 2026 contactless payments were introduced in all stations, where customers could touch in and out with a credit or debit card and Mobile payment. Over 325,000 journeys were recorded in the first month of use.

== Services ==
The Subway runs from 06:30 to 23:40 Monday to Saturday (last trains departing Govan at 23:15) and 10:00 to 18:12 on Sunday (last trains departing Govan at 17:50). Trains run every 6–8 minutes during off-peak periods on both Inner (anti-clockwise) and Outer (clockwise) services.

In March 2026 plans were approved to extend the opening hours of the subway on a Sunday from 06:30 to 23:30, service on a Saturday and Friday evenings will also be extended by one hour to 00:30. The extended hours will only be brought into effect when the modernisation has been completed.

=== Nightrider ===
The Nightrider was a contracted bus route announced in February 2007 and started in April of that year to provide public transport around the city at weekends when the Subway is closed for maintenance. It was operated by First Glasgow as route 701 clockwise and route 711 anti-clockwise.

In May 2008, it was revealed that the bus service was to discontinue after the original 15-month contract ended due to high subsidisation costs, it was roughly costing £15 per passenger for the service to run.

== iShoogle ==
In September 2012 SPT launched an app for Apple iPhones and Android smartphones called iShoogle which allows users to "Check in" using Facebook at Subway stations. Shoogle guide does a search of local area amenities such as bars, shops, cafes, banks and entertainment that are near subway stations, there are local area maps using Apple Maps or Google Maps as well as the official SPT map and timetables of the first and last trains and photos from SPT's archives. The app also has facts about the Subway.

== Cultural references ==
=== Nicknames ===
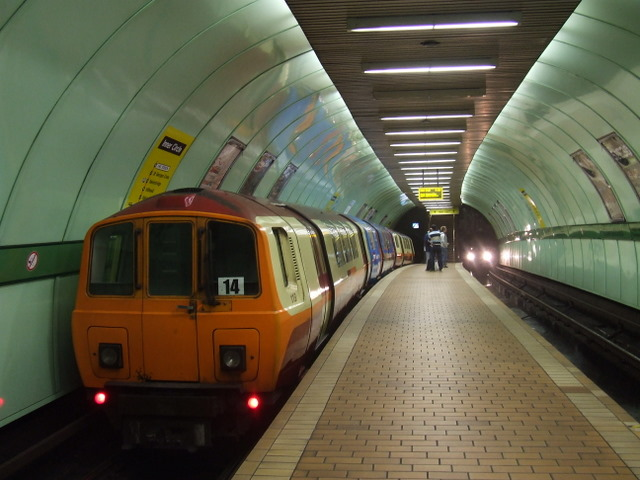
Cowcaddens subway station

The origin of the Subway's supposed, but seldom used outside the press, nickname, "The Clockwork Orange" (coined from the title of the book and film A Clockwork Orange) is subject to dispute. Some believe that it was originally coined by the media of the period, while others credit it to the then chairman of British Rail, Sir Peter Parker, who was quoted in a late 1970s publicity video of the new trains as saying "so these are the original Clockwork Orange". Most of its carriages were painted orange (although called "Strathclyde PTE red" because "Orange" has sectarian connotations in Glasgow), the corporate colour of Greater Glasgow Passenger Transport Executive at the time.

While the "Clockwork Orange" nickname is often used in tourist guidebooks and local literature, it is virtually unused by locals, who will refer to the system simply as "the Subway" or "the Underground".

Prior to the introduction of new trains in the 1970s, the name "Shoogly Train" ("shoogly" meaning "shaky" in the Scots language) was used because the design of the cars allowed a degree of movement or "shoogle" between the backrest and squab of each seat.

=== "The Underground Song" ===
The celebrated Glaswegian writer and broadcaster Cliff Hanley composed a satirical song about the pre-modernisation era Subway entitled "The Underground Song". It was popular as a stage piece performed by the comedians Rikki Fulton and Jack Milroy in their Francie and Josie act.

The chorus of the song is:

There's Partick Cross and Cessnock, Hillhead and Merkland Street,
St George's Cross and Govan Cross where all the people meet;
West Street, Shields Road – The train goes round and round;
You've never lived unless you've been on the Glasgow Underground.

=== The Subcrawl ===
The Glasgow Subway and its adjacent public houses are the focal point of a pub crawl known as the Subcrawl. Participants buy an all day ticket, disembark at each of the 15 stations and have a drink in the nearest bar.

== See also ==
- Transport in Glasgow
- Glasgow Corporation Tramways (until 1962)
- List of rapid transit systems
- Scottish Tramway and Transport Society
