= Partickhill railway station =

Former railway station in Scotland

Partickhill
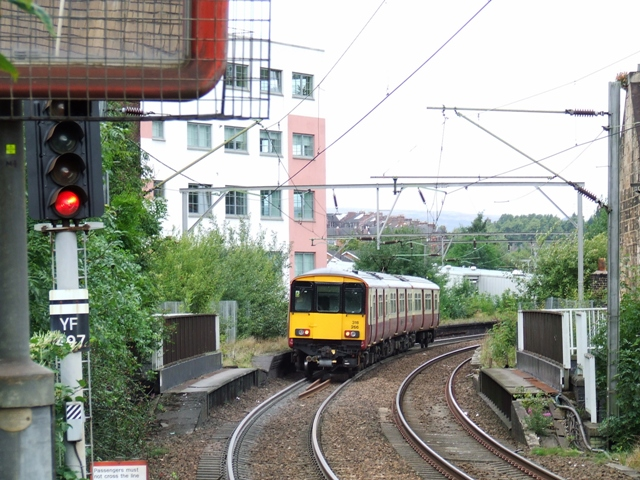
- The site of Partickhill station in 2007.

General information
- Location: Partick, Glasgow; Scotland
- Coordinates: 55.8723°N 4.3117°W
- Platforms: 2

Other information
- Status: Disused

History
- Original company: North British Railway
- Pre-grouping: North British Railway

Key dates
- 20 October 1874: Opened as Partick
- 1953: Renamed as Partickhill
- 17 December 1979: Closed
Location

Partickhill railway station was a railway station serving the Partick area of Glasgow. The station was opened by the North British Railway Company in 1874 on the north side of Dumbarton Road. At some periods during its existence it was described as Partick for Govan in some timetables.

== History ==
It was at one stage, one of three stations in Partick, along with the Central and West stations, but was the only one of the three stations to be spared in the Beeching cuts of the mid-1960s, having been extensively rebuilt in 1958.

The station closed in 1979, when the Greater Glasgow Passenger Transport Executive were reopening the Argyle Line (itself a victim of the Beeching axe), they decided to open a new Partick railway station on the same site as Merkland Street subway station, which was itself undergoing refurbishment as part of the overall upgrade of the Glasgow Subway that was undertaken in the late 1970s. With this new Partick station, which worked as an interchange with bus and subway services being separated by only a bridge over Dumbarton Road from the site of the Partickhill station it was decided that the Partickhill site was now redundant and the station closed.

Much of its structures are still visible to the present day, including the platforms.

== Services ==
Preceding station	Historical railways	Following station
Stobcross; Line and station (as Exhibition Centre) open	Stobcross Railway; North British Railway	Hyndland; Line and Station closed
Stobcross; Line and station (as Exhibition Centre) open	Stobcross Railway; North British Railway	Anniesland; Line and Station open
Finnieston; Line open; station closed	Glasgow City and District Railway; North British Railway	Junction with Stobcross Railway at Kelvinhaugh Junction
Junction with Stobcross Railway at Jordanhill Junction	Whiteinch Railway; North British Railway	Jordanhill; Line and station open
