= Buchanan Street subway station =

Glasgow subway station

Buchanan Street Sràid Bhochanain
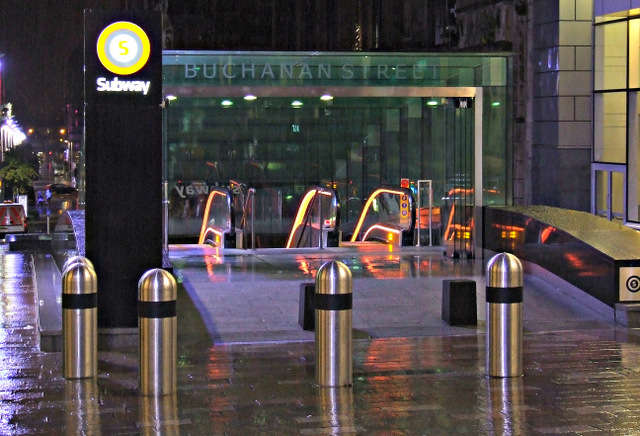
- Station exterior

General information
- Location: 174 Buchanan Street; Glasgow, G1 2JZ; Scotland
- Coordinates: 55.8624566°N 4.2534051°W
- System: Glasgow Subway
- Operator: SPT
- Transit authority: SPT
- Platforms: 2 (side platforms)
- Tracks: 2
- Connections: Buchanan Bus Station; Glasgow Queen Street

Construction
- Structure type: Underground
- Parking: No
- Cycle facilities: Yes (bike hire)
- Accessible: No

Other information
- Fare zone: 1

History
- Opened: 14 December 1896
- Rebuilt: 16 April 1980; 46 years ago

Passengers
- 2018: ▲2.501 million
- 2019: ▼2.490 million
- 2020: ▼0.829 million
- 2021: ▲1.059 million
- 2022: ▲2.083 million

Services
Preceding station	SPT	Following station
Cowcaddens anticlockwise / inner circle	Glasgow Subway	St Enoch clockwise / outer circle
Location
Notes
- Passenger statistics provided are gate entries only. Information on gate exits for patronage is incomplete, and thus not included.

Buchanan Street subway station (Scottish Gaelic: Sràid Bhochanain) is a station on the Glasgow Subway in Scotland. It serves the major shopping thoroughfare of Buchanan Street, and is one of two stations on the Subway (along with St Enoch) that directly serve the city centre. Close to Buchanan Bus Station and providing interchange with Glasgow Queen Street railway station via a travelator, it is the busiest station on the Subway, with 2.48 million passengers recorded in 2024.

When built in 1896 the station had a single island platform serving both tracks. An additional side platform was added as part of the 1977-1980 modernisation scheme. A glass wall was added on one side of the island platform to prevent access to the train that is boarding at the side platform. Each platform has a single stairway linking it to the ticket hall, causing congestion during peak hours due to conflicting passenger movements in the same space. The station was closed in 2002 as a result of the Glasgow floods with trains continuing to run without stopping at the station.

Other than St Enoch it is the only station with an underground ticket hall. Originally, the surface access to the station was located on the ground floor of an adjacent building on the east side of the street. This building was demolished to insert the travelator to Queen Street mainline station with the remains of the original stairwell now serving as the entrance into the ticket hall at the end of the travelator passage. A gift shop now stands on the site of the surface building, which as of 2026 is threatened with demolition as part of a proposed extension to the Buchanan Galleries shopping mall.

In line with the pedestrianisation of Buchanan Street in 1977, two new street level entrances were added - located in the middle of the former roadway during the modernisation scheme, with escalators serving the northern entrance and a staircase at the southern end of the ticket hall. The canopies were replaced in 1999 as part of the repaving of Buchanan Street - the northern canopy is constructed entirely of structural glass: all beams and columns, the walls and roof are glass.

Part of carriage 41 from the Subway's pre-1977 rolling stock was also preserved within the station, but has since been removed as part of the 2010s renovation to the network.

== Past passenger numbers ==
- 2011/12: 2.484 million annually

== Gallery ==
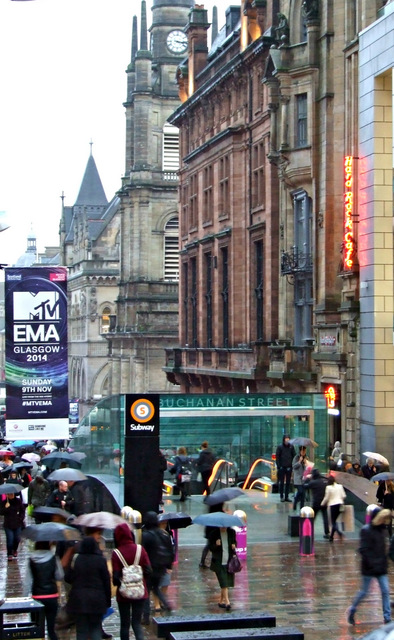
Station Exterior

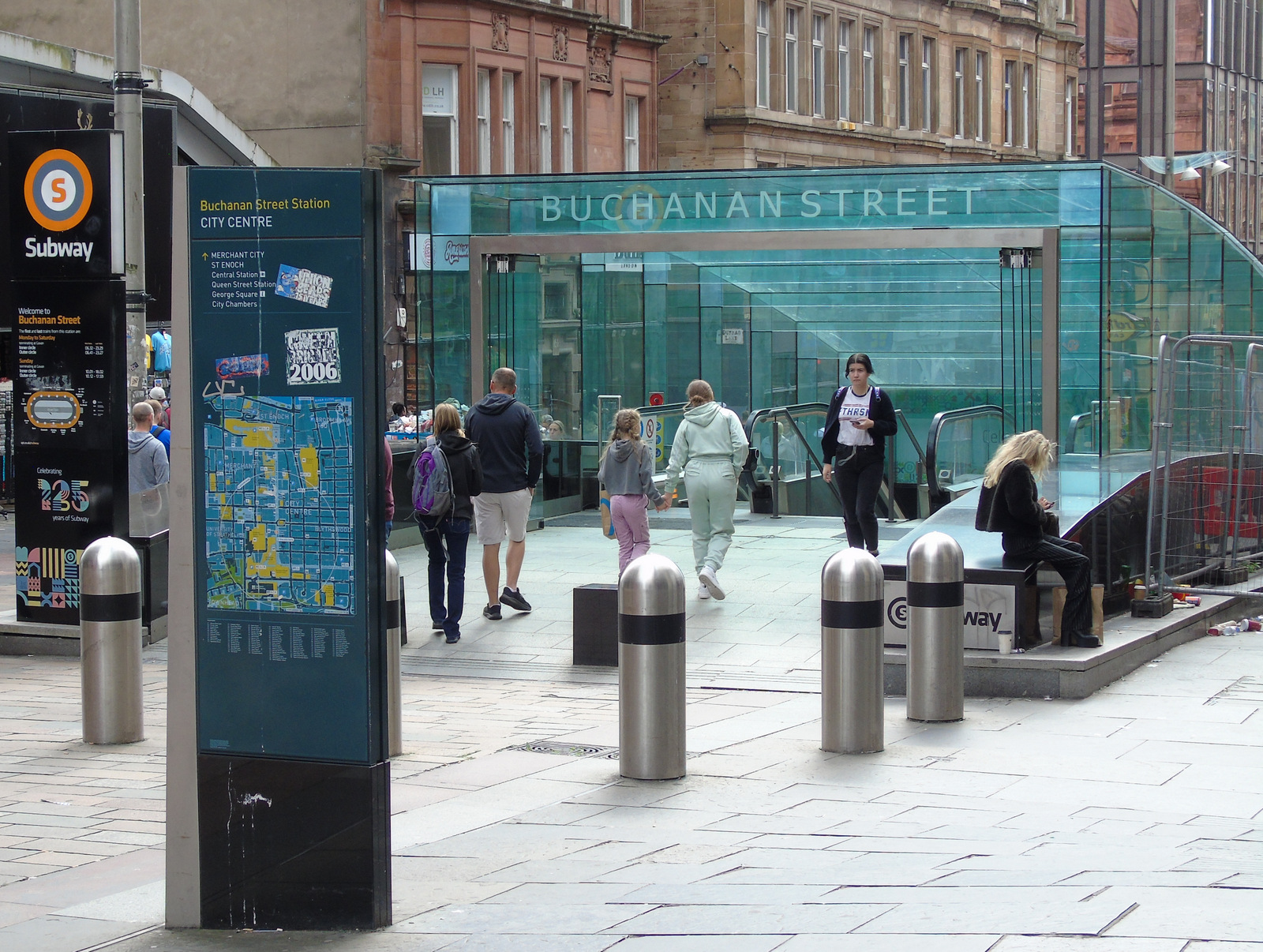

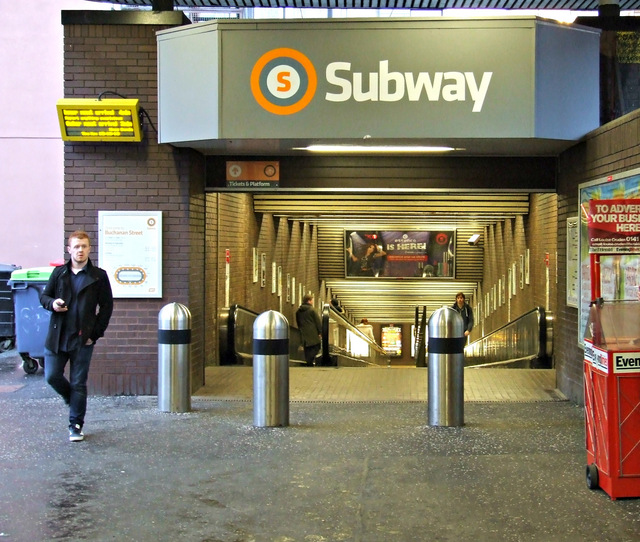
Travelator from Glasgow Queen Street Rail station

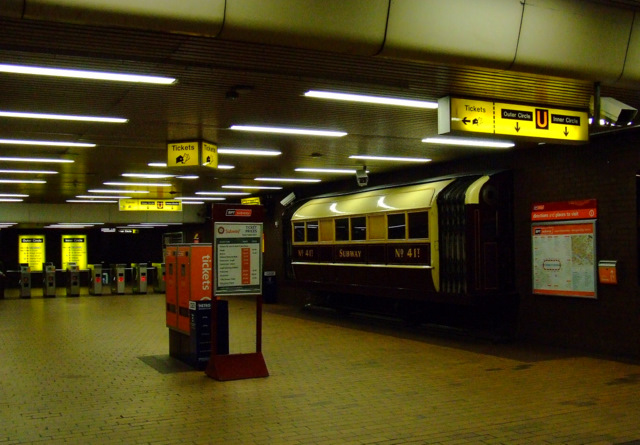
Ticket hall prior to refurbishment

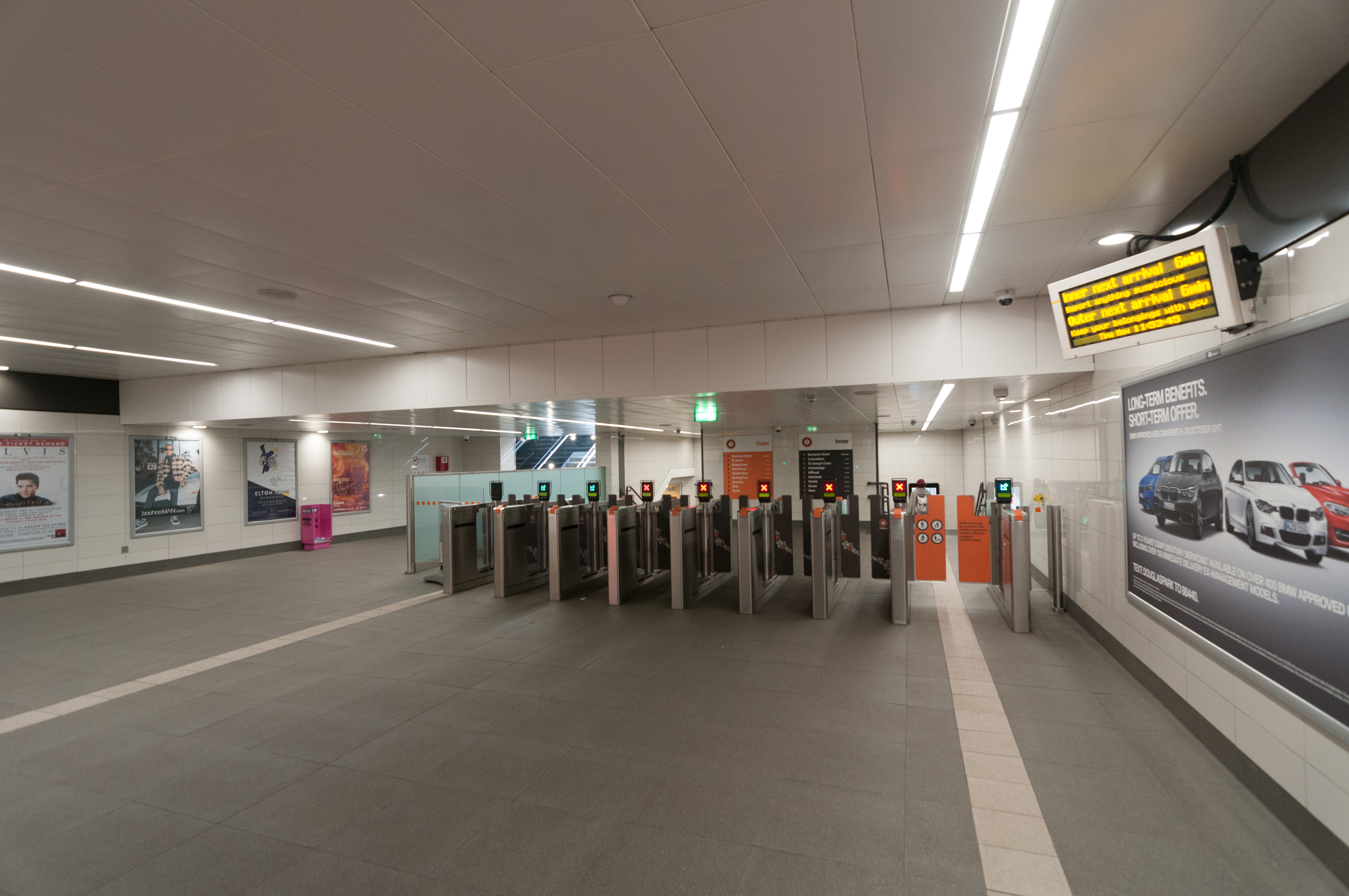
Ticket hall in 2015

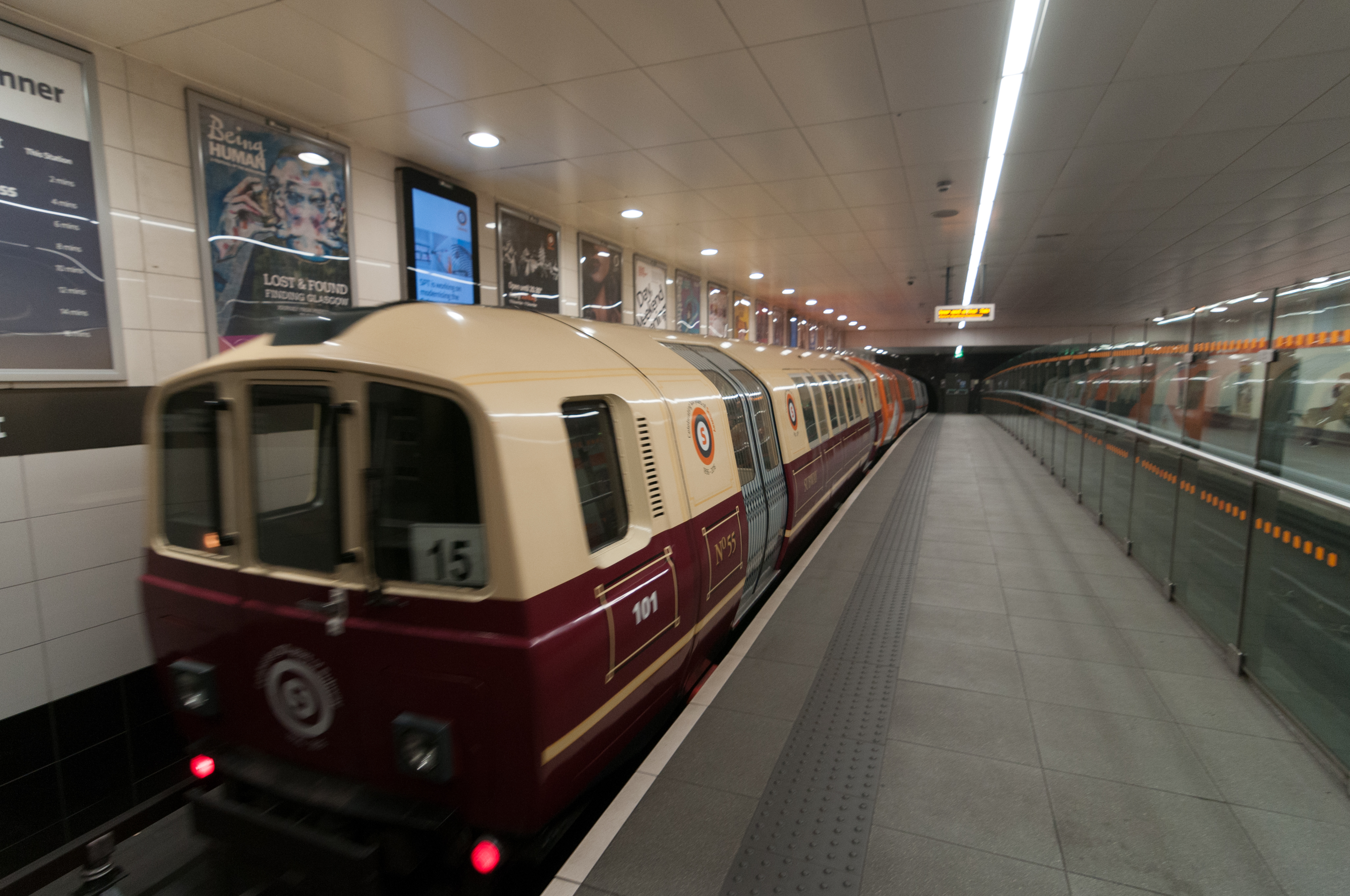
Inner Circle train departing
