= Scotsman Group =

Scottish hospitality operator

Scotsman Group PLC
- Type: Public limited company
- Predecessor: King City Leisure, G1 Group
- Founded: 1990
- Founder: Stefan King
- Headquarters: Glasgow, Scotland, UK
- Website: www.scotsman.group

The Scotsman Group (previously G1 Group and King City Leisure) is a Scottish hospitality and leisure operator based in Glasgow, Scotland. It is run by its founder Stefan King. The company operates more than 50 venues in cities all over Scotland, most notably in Glasgow and Edinburgh.

Their portfolio of venues include restaurants, bars, late night bars, nightclubs, cinemas and hotels. In recent years, the Group has become known for taking a special interest in the purchase and investment in listed buildings, or those with significant historical importance. These include former banks, newspaper headquarters and a former High Court.

== History ==
Initially the company was called King City Leisure before being rebranded as G1 Group. The Scotsman Group's first venue, Club X on Royal Exchange Square in Glasgow, was opened in 1990. In 1999, the Group opened The Corinthian Club in Glasgow, which would become their flagship venue in the city. The same year the company turned a profit of £1.4 million.

In 2005, the Scotsman Group branched out into the leased pub business, with the launch of The IONA Pub Partnership. In 2011, the Group moved into the former BBC headquarters in Queen Margaret Drive, which was built in 1869 and had housed BBC Scotland between 1936 and 2007. The Scotsman Group expanded into Edinburgh in 2011 after investing almost £30 million in acquiring a number of Edinburgh pubs. In 2017, the group made its most significant investment to date with the purchase of The Scotsman Hotel on Edinburgh's North Bridge.

The Shimmy Club in Glasgow, which is a Scotsman Group company, hit headlines in 2013 because it was designed to allow patrons to view the hand wash area of the ladies toilets. The city's licensing board forced the venue to close for a week because of the risk of "predatory behaviour" towards women, then ordered the club to remove the two-way mirror and put its staff through equalities training as a licensing condition.

In 2014, a disabled couple won a discrimination case against the Scotsman Group after they were refused entry to the Polo Lounge, a Scotsman Group venue. Bouncers did not allow them into the Glasgow venue, which the couple had visited before, because they claimed it had no disabled facilities.

In 2015, the Scotsman Group was named and shamed for not paying the minimum wage to almost 3,000 workers.

The firm illegally underpaid staff by more than £45,000 by making deductions from wages to pay for staff uniforms and training. The Scotsman Group stopped this practice after it was named by the Department for Business Innovation and Skills in a list of companies that failed to pay the minimum wage.

In 2020, during the Coronavirus pandemic, the company sacked hundreds of staff over the phone. Staff members were told a slowdown in trade brought on by the Coronavirus crisis was the cause of the job losses.

The company's headquarters are at Hamilton House, 70 Hamilton Drive, Glasgow, G12 8DR

== List of businesses ==
- No1 Sandwich Street
- Delmonicas, Virginia Street
- Café Latte
- The Polo Lounge
- Club X
- Archaos nightclub and the Skye bar
- Yang
- Nicos, Sauchiehall Street
- The Corinthian Club, Ingram Street, Glasgow
- Union Bank of Scotland Headquarters, Glasgow
- The Shimmy Club
