= Argyle Street railway station =

Railway station in Glasgow, Scotland

Argyle Street Scottish Gaelic: Sràid Earra-Ghàidheal
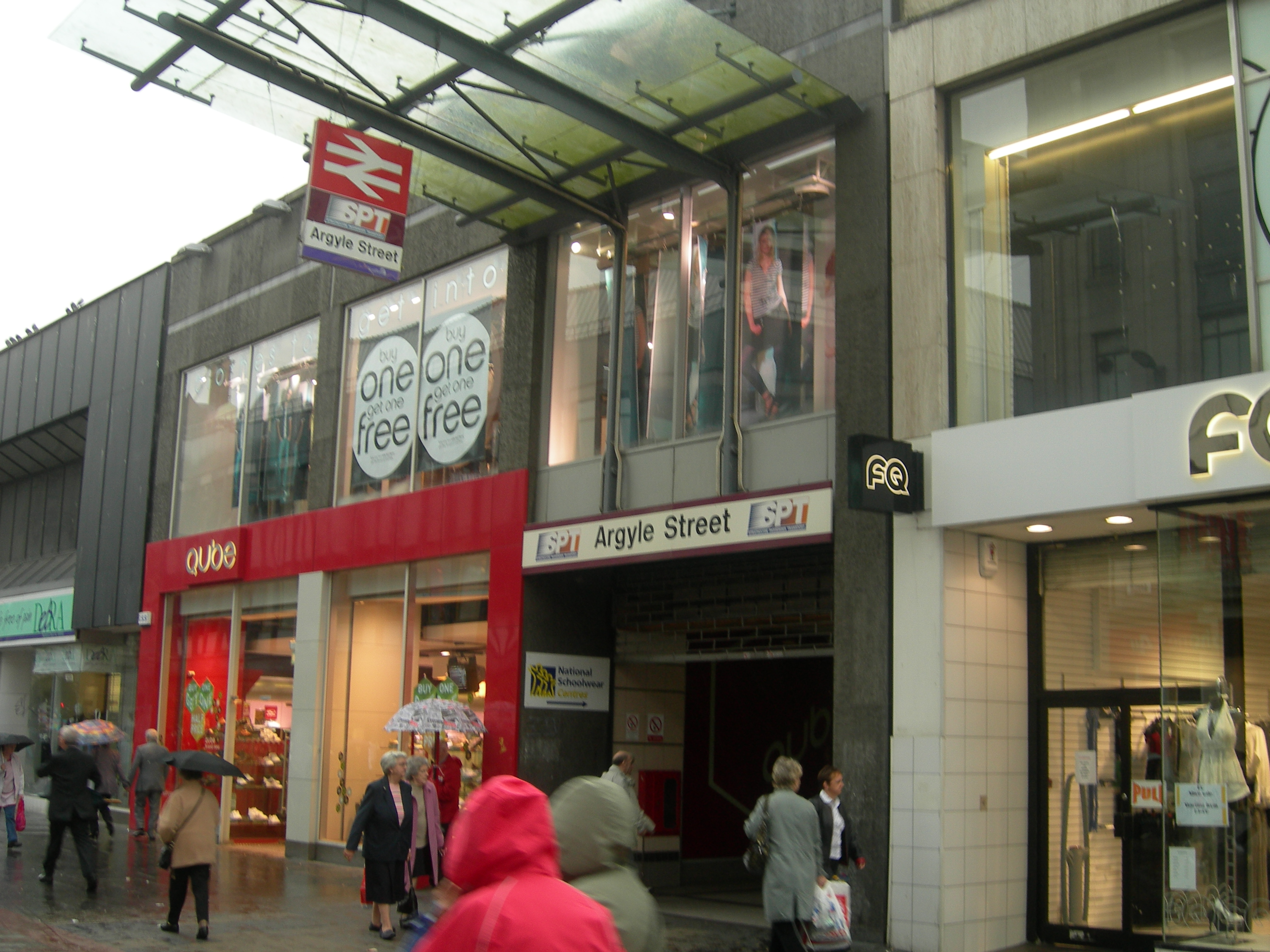
- Argyle Street railway station exterior, on Argyle Street

General information
- Location: Glasgow, Glasgow; Scotland
- Coordinates: 55.857°N 4.251°W
- Grid reference: NS592649
- Owner: Network Rail
- Manager: ScotRail
- Transit authority: SPT
- Platforms: 2

Other information
- Station code: AGS
- Fare zone: 1

History
- Original company: British Rail

Key dates
- 5 November 1979: Opened

Passengers
- 2021/22: ▲0.773 million
- 2022/23: ▲0.810 million
- 2023/24: ▲1.271 million
- 2024/25: ▲1.279 million
- 2025/26: ▲1.351 million
Location
Notes
- Passenger statistics from the Office of Rail and Road

Argyle Street railway station is a station in the City Centre of Glasgow, Scotland, on the Argyle Line, which connects the North Clyde lines at Partick with Rutherglen in the south-east of the city. The station is located below the thoroughfare whose name it bears. It has a narrow and often crowded island platform. It serves the Argyle Street shopping precinct as well as the St Enoch Centre. The station is open all day Monday to Saturdays but is only open between 10am and 6pm on a Sunday.

== History ==
The Glasgow Central Railway was formed in 1888 to link the Clydesdale Junction Railway and Lanarkshire and Ayrshire Railway with the Lanarkshire and Dunbartonshire Railway. By the time it was opened between 1894 and 1897, the GCR had been taken over by the Caledonian Railway. Although there were three stations under Argyle Street - Anderston, Glasgow Central and Glasgow Cross, there was no station on the site of the current station.

The line closed in 1964, but it was reopened by British Rail in 1979 and operated by the Scottish Region of British Railways by arrangement with the Greater Glasgow PTE. Although the Central Low Level station was reopened, Glasgow Cross was not reopened; instead the new Argyle Street station was constructed, midway between Glasgow Cross and Glasgow Central.

== Station access ==
When the 1979 reopening took place, a simple island platform was required, but footings of adjacent buildings and other physical constraints limited the available tunnel width for the new station. Moreover, the roadway above had not yet been pedestrianised, and street access and station building construction was not acceptable within the road limits. Accordingly, station building premises were constructed within the ordinary building line on the south side of the street; access to the platforms is via Argyle Street and Osborne Street into the ticket hall, then down an escalator into the station lower level, below track level. A passageway then leads under the westbound track and a second escalator leads up to the island platform which is located directly under Argyle street. Due to the platforms being fully underground, The station is required by law to have 2 members of staff on at all times and the station can not be open if neither is available.

Lift access was not considered on the grounds of expense and the physical limits of the platform space.

During the 2006/7 escalator renewal work the only passenger access to the lower level (under platform) of the station was via the steep emergency exit steps.

Ticket barriers came into operation on 17 June 2011.

=== Disabled access ===
This station does not have any disabled access due to the narrowness of the island platform. Installation of lift access would require platform widening, which would in turn require widening of the tunnel, requiring massive alteration to the buildings adjacent.

== Services ==
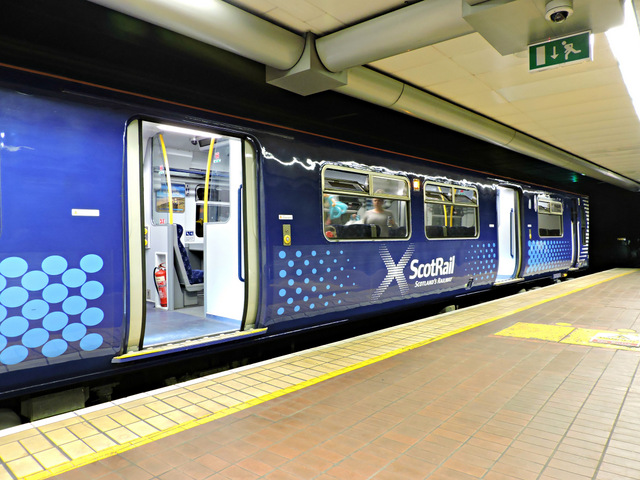
Train at Argyle Street station

=== From 1979 ===
Mondays to Saturdays

- 3 per hour - Dalmuir to Hamilton Circle (clockwise)
- 3 per hour - Dalmuir to Hamilton Circle (anti-clockwise)
- 1 per hour Limited Stop - Milngavie to Lanark

=== 2014 ===
On Monday to Saturdays, trains leave approximately every ten minutes, destined for Dalmuir, Milngavie, Partick, Yoker, Singer, Lanark, Larkhall, Hamilton Central, Whifflet and Motherwell. During peak hours, services to Cumbernauld via Coatbridge and Carstairs are also available.

On Sundays, no services call here before 10am or after 6pm so services on Sundays are Balloch-Motherwell, Milngavie-Motherwell or Lanark, and Partick-Larkhall.

=== 2023 ===
There is a regular service of 6 trains per hour each way, This is as follows: On Monday to Saturdays:

- 2 trains per hour to Larkhall via Hamilton Central.
- 2 trains per hour to Whifflet(1 train an hour extends to Motherwell)
- 4 trains per hour to Dalmuir(2 via Yoker and 2 the other via Singer)
- 2 trains per hour to Milngavie via Westerton.

Sundays: On a Sunday, The station is only open between 10am and 6pm with trains not stopping before or after these times, When the station is open the service is as follows:

- 2 trains per hour to Motherwell(One via Whifflet and the other via Hamilton Central)
- 2 trains per hour to Balloch via Dalmuir
- 1 train per hour to Larkhall

Preceding station	National Rail	Following station
Bridgeton	ScotRail; Argyle Line	Glasgow Central; Low Level

== Gallery ==
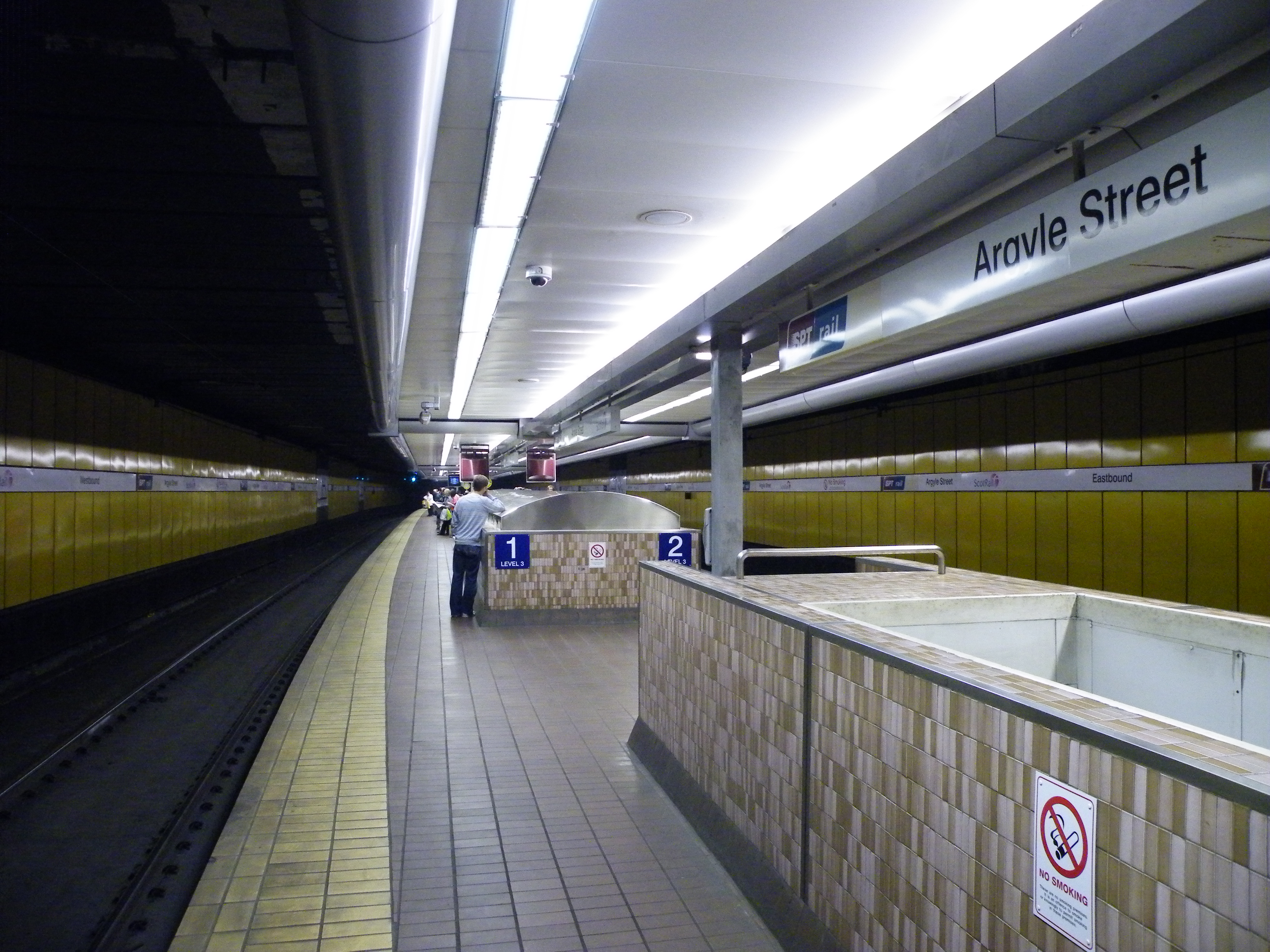
The island platform at Argyle Street station

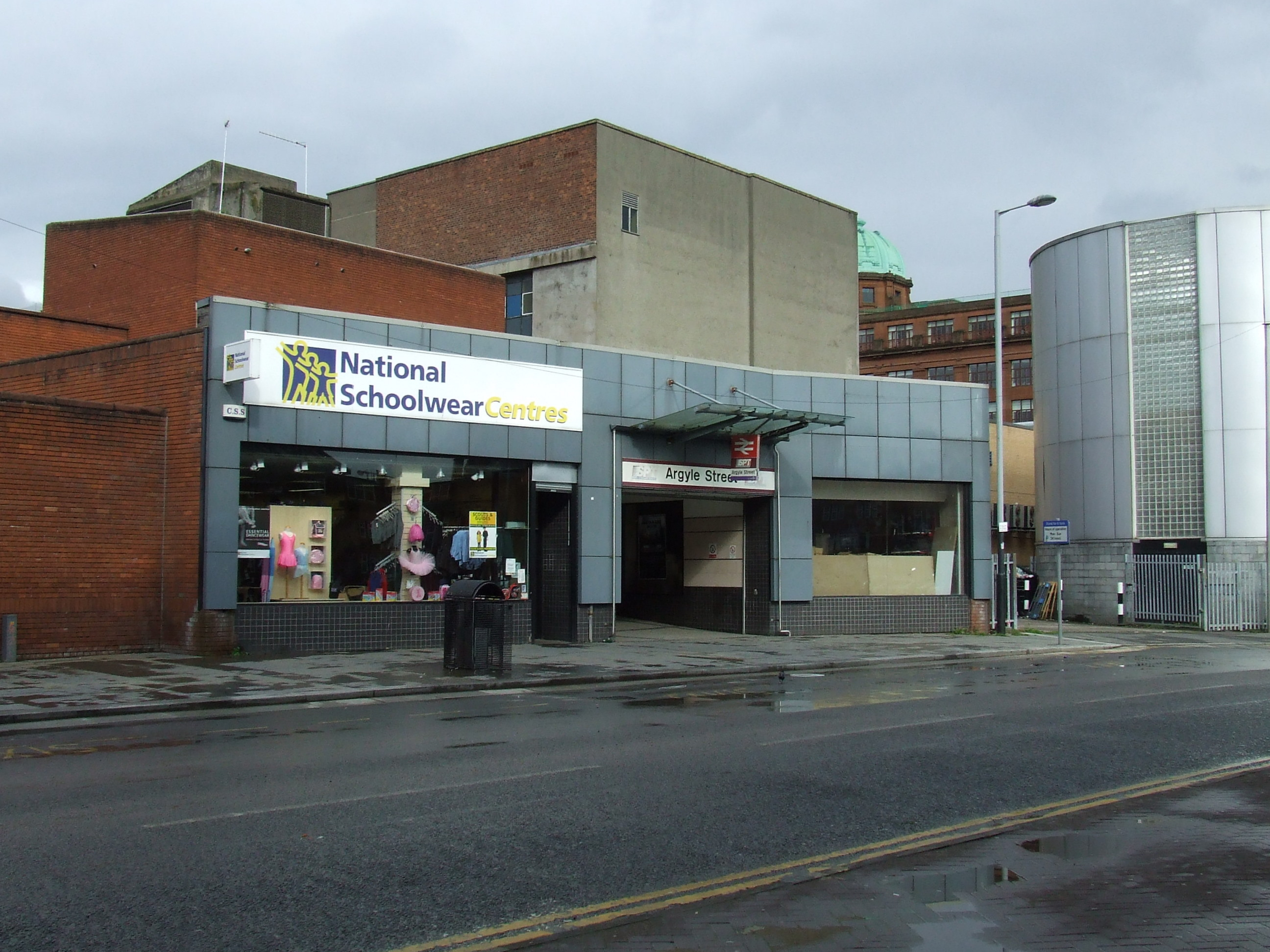
Rear entrance on Osborne Street

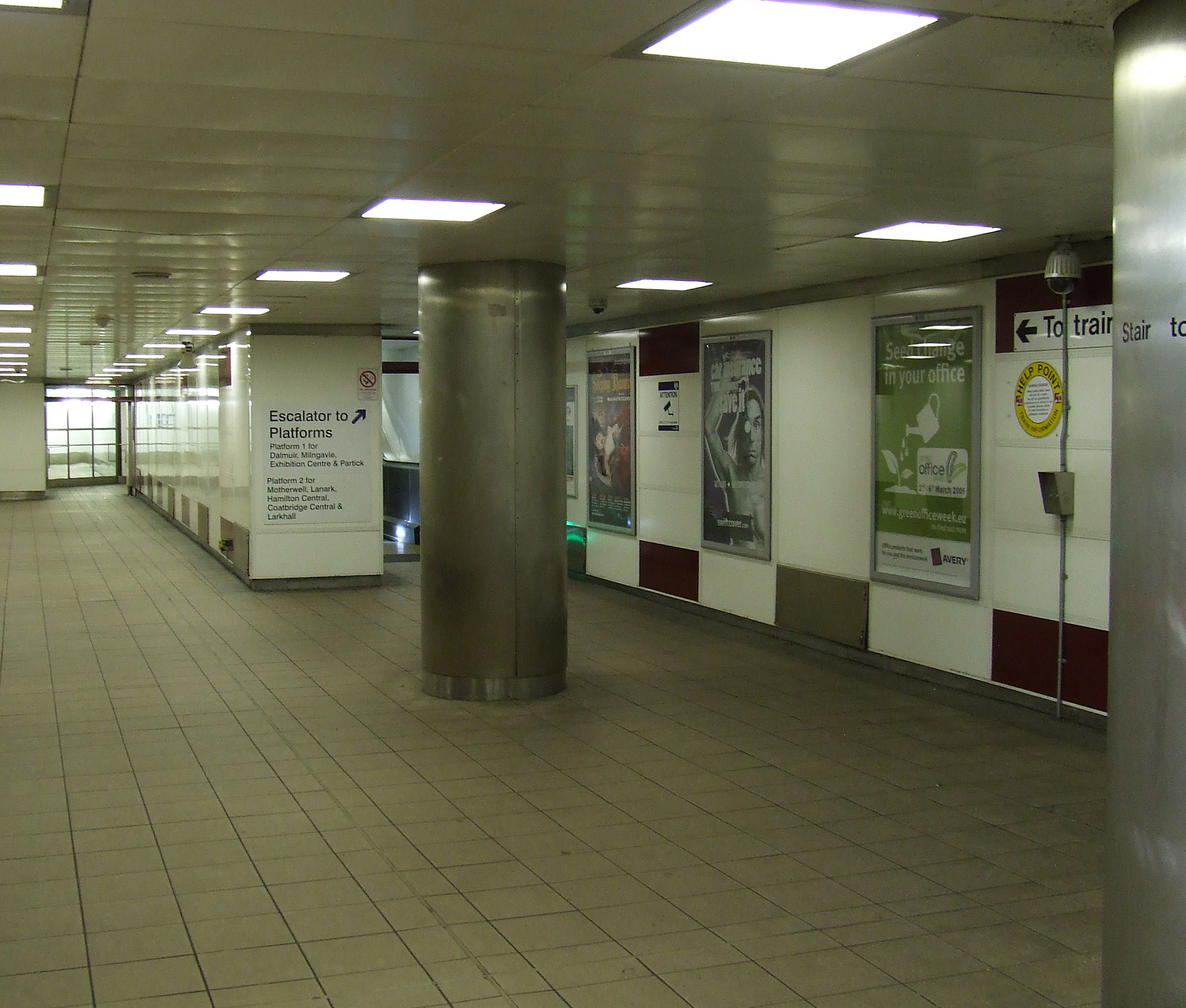
Argyle Street station concourse

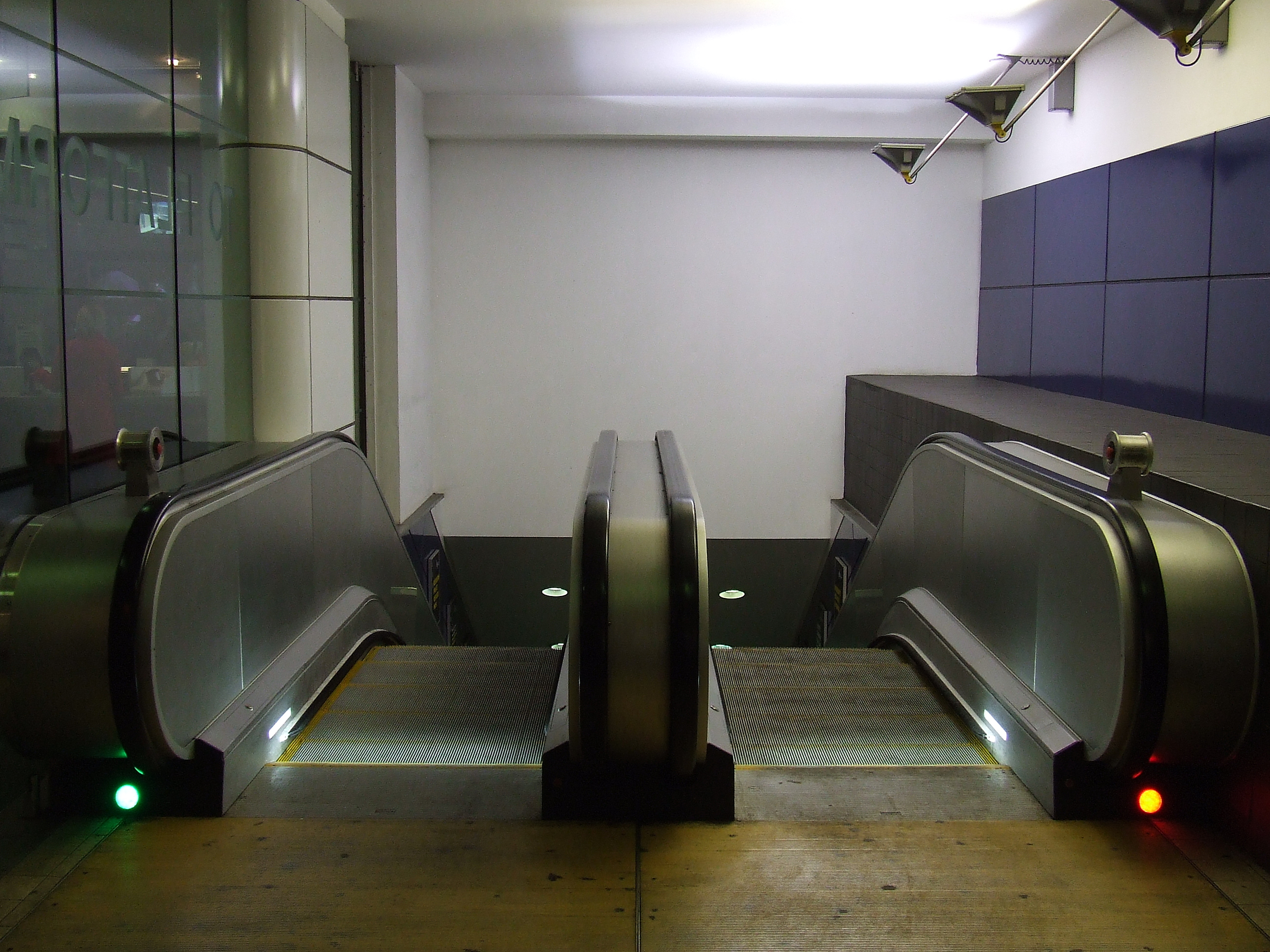
The top of the escalators
