= Sports Information Services =

Content and production services for betting industry

Sports Information Services Limited
- SIS logo as of 2019
- Formerly: Satellite Information Services Ltd.
- Type: Private
- Industry: Broadcasting, Racing Services
- Founded: 1986
- Headquarters: Milton Keynes, United Kingdom
- Products: Picture, Data, Virtual Betting
- Revenue: £202.5 million
- Net income: £16.3 million (2017)
- Number of employees: 392 (2017)
- Subsidiaries: SIS LIVE Limited (2015–2018)
- Website: www.sis.tv

Sports Information Services (SIS) is a British company that provides live pictures, data, and production services to the betting industry, primarily for horse racing and greyhound racing. Its content is distributed to betting shops in the United Kingdom and Ireland, as well as to international markets. The company was founded in 1986 as Satellite Information Services and launched its first live betting shop television service in Bristol in 1987. It later expanded into broadcast production and satellite services through its former subsidiary SIS Live, which was acquired by NEP Group in 2018 and rebranded as NEP Connect.

== History ==
The company’s early development was closely linked to changes in betting shop regulation in the United Kingdom, which permitted the installation of television screens showing live racing and replaced the earlier Extel system based on audio commentary and manually updated results boards. Its first live betting shop television service was launched in Bristol on 5 May 1987, initially supplying coverage from two horse racing meetings and one greyhound racing meeting per day to around 100 licensed betting offices, with a target of reaching 3,000 outlets within its first year of operation.

During the 1990s, the service was gradually expanded across the United Kingdom and Ireland. In 2002, SIS successfully renegotiated its contracts with UK and Irish bookmakers for a further five-year period and was appointed by the betting industry to manage broadcasting rights for 49 UK racecourses, integrating those races into its service. By 2003, the company was supplying coverage of more than 1,200 UK horse race meetings and 1,500 greyhound meetings annually, in addition to around 300 Irish and 300 South African horse race meetings each year. Following the introduction of the National Lottery, SIS also expanded its portfolio to include numbers-based betting products, including virtual horse and greyhound racing.

In 2008, SIS diversified into broadcast production and satellite services through the acquisition of the outside broadcasting division of BBC Resources (BBC Outside Broadcasts). The combined operations were launched as SIS Live in September 2008.

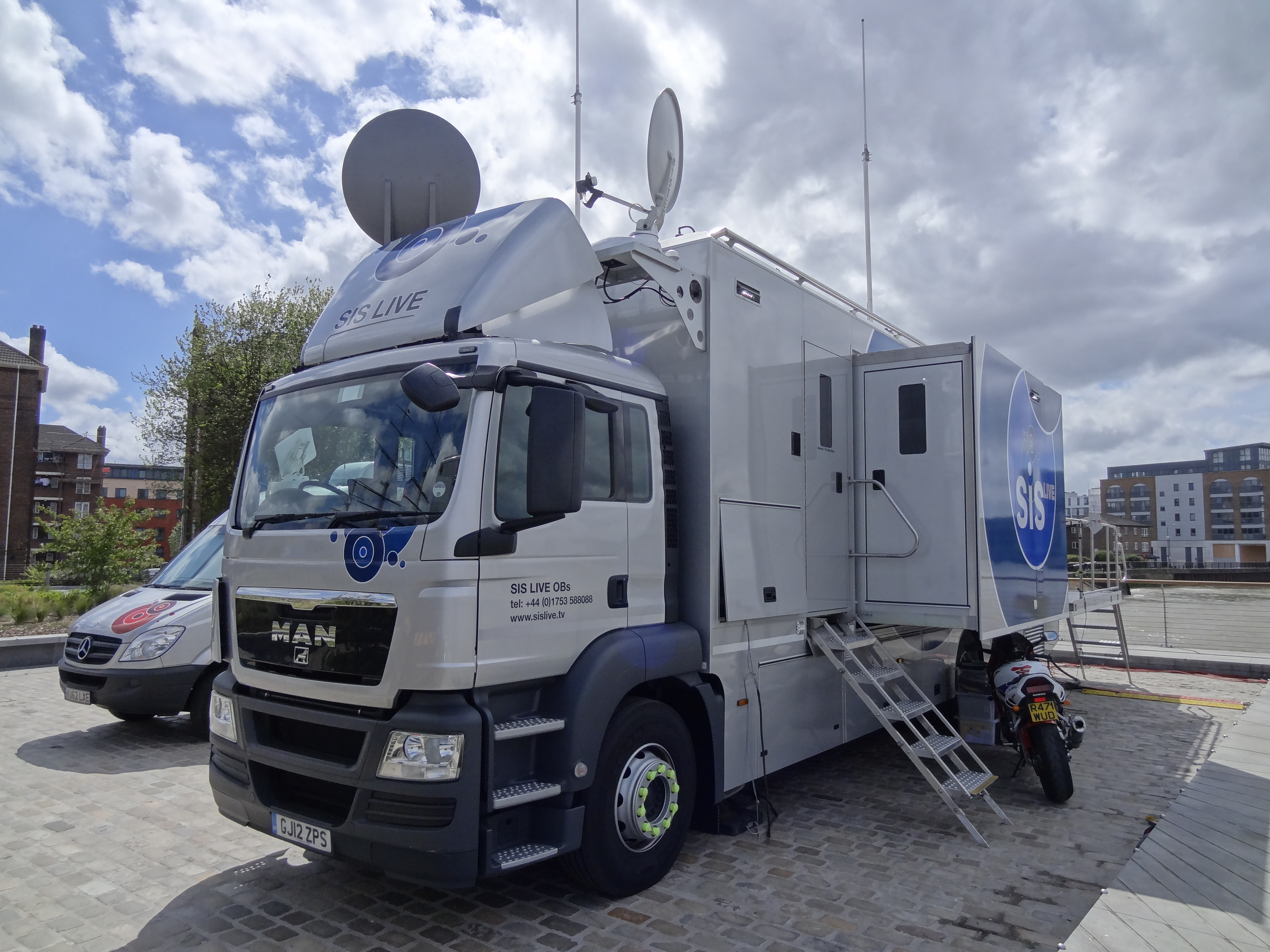
SIS Live's OB14 outside broadcast unit

By this time, SIS services were received in virtually all betting shops in the United Kingdom and Ireland, as well as in approximately 300 outlets across Western Europe, totalling around 9,500 shops. The company also distributed betting content to outlets in the Caribbean, Sri Lanka, Italy, and parts of the former Soviet Union.

In 2011, SIS became a partner of Peel Media in the operation of television studios and post-production facilities at MediaCityUK in Salford, trading as Media City Studios Ltd, which was rebranded as dock10 in 2012. The following year, several SIS departments relocated to the MediaCityUK complex, where the company opened one of the largest satellite teleports in the United Kingdom. From these facilities, SIS broadcast approximately 80 hours of television programming per day for the betting industry, with operations duplicated from its base in Milton Keynes. The company also handled satellite uplinks and downlinks for international broadcasters and sports organisations, including the BBC, ITV, ITN, Channel 4, Intelsat, Sky News, Sky Sports, Sky Arabia, RRSat, and the European and Asian golf tours.

In November 2013, SIS announced a seven-year contract with ITV regional news and ITN to supply high-definition satellite news gathering vehicles using Ka-band satellite capacity. In 2014, SIS Live closed the outside broadcast department it had acquired from the BBC in 2008 and withdrew from the outside broadcasting market.

After operating for many years as a trading name, the satellite news gathering and connectivity division was formally separated into a standalone company, SIS Live Ltd, in 2015, sharing the same chief executive as SIS but becoming responsible for its own commercial decisions.

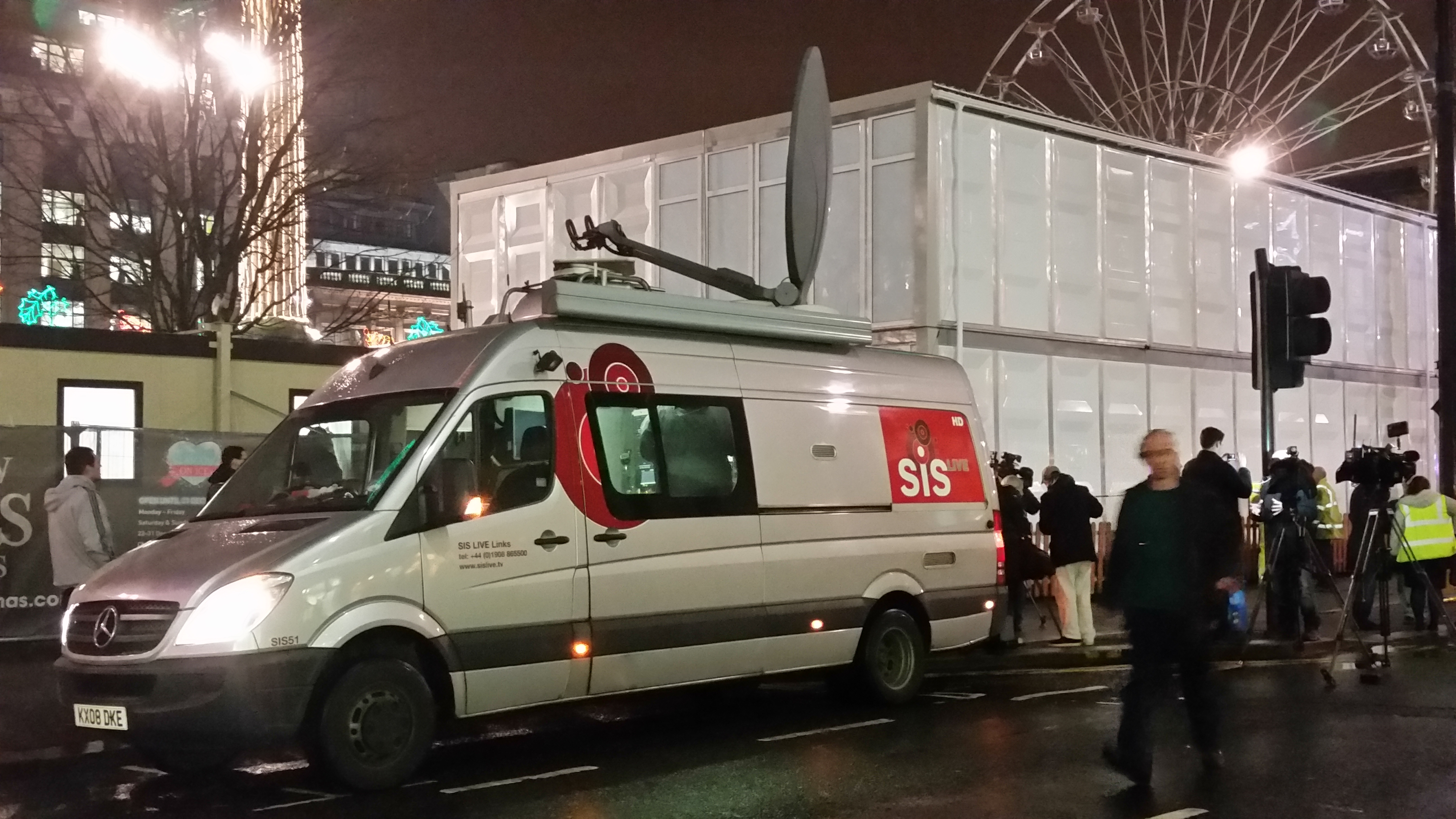
SIS Live SNG vehicle covering the 2014 Glasgow bin lorry crash

During this period, SIS Live provided satellite coverage of major news events, including the 2014 Glasgow bin lorry crash. In January 2017, the company announced a rebranding, retaining the SIS acronym but changing its meaning from Satellite Information Services to Sports Information Services, stating that the original name no longer reflected the company’s activities or strategic direction.

In 2018, SIS Live Limited was acquired by NEP Group and rebranded as NEP Connect after a transition period of approximately two months. NEP Connect has since continued to operate as a technical services supplier to SIS.

== Ownership and market position ==
SIS is owned by Ladbrokes 23%, Caledonia Investments 22.5%, Alternateport Limited 20.5%, William Hill Organisation 19.5%, Fred Done (co-owner of Betfred bookmakers) 7.5% and The Tote 6%. Minor shareholdings are also held by Leicester Racecourse Holdings Limited, The Bibury Club Limited (Salisbury), Stratford-on-Avon Racecourse Co. Ltd., Thirsk Racecourse Ltd., Catterick Racecourse Company Ltd. and Frontrelay Ltd.

Shareholder bookmakers account for approximately 5,800 LBOs receiving the SIS service. Each of the bookmaker shareholders have board members representing them on the SIS (Holdings) board in the form of Nick Rust (Ladbrokes), Fred Done (Betfred), David Steele (William Hill) and Joe Scanlon (Tote).

In 2008 Amalgamated Racing Limited (trading as TurfTV) entered the marketplace and was SIS's only competitor for the distribution of horse racing and virtual racing products to LBOs in the UK and Ireland. TurfTV does not distribute to any of the worldwide locations serviced by SIS.

On 1 September 2016, seven independent racecourses (Fakenham, Ffos Las, Hexham, Newton Abbot, Plumpton, Ripon and Towcester) led by ARC (Arena Racing Company) started an alternative service known as The Racing Partnership ("TRP"). Coverage from ARC-owned racecourses, including Doncaster, Southwell, Lingfield Park and Wolverhampton became available on TRP from 1 January 2017 with all other ARC and independent racecourses being added to the schedule over the following year. TRP's media technology and production and head of production are both ex-SIS employees..
