= Sabina Cameron =

British actor

Sabina Cameron is a British actor who played Dr Ley in the soap opera Hollyoaks and who starred as in Tolu in Adura Onashile's play Expensive Shit.

== Early life ==
Cameron studied at Arts Educational School (ArtsEd), graduating in 2005.

== Career ==
Cameron played Dr Ley in British soap opera Hollyoaks. She starred as Tolu in Adura Onashile's play Expensive Shit where she is credited for her acting and dancing. She also appeared in the London production of Harry Potter and the Cursed Child.
