= Tam Shepherds Trick Shop =

Scottish shop

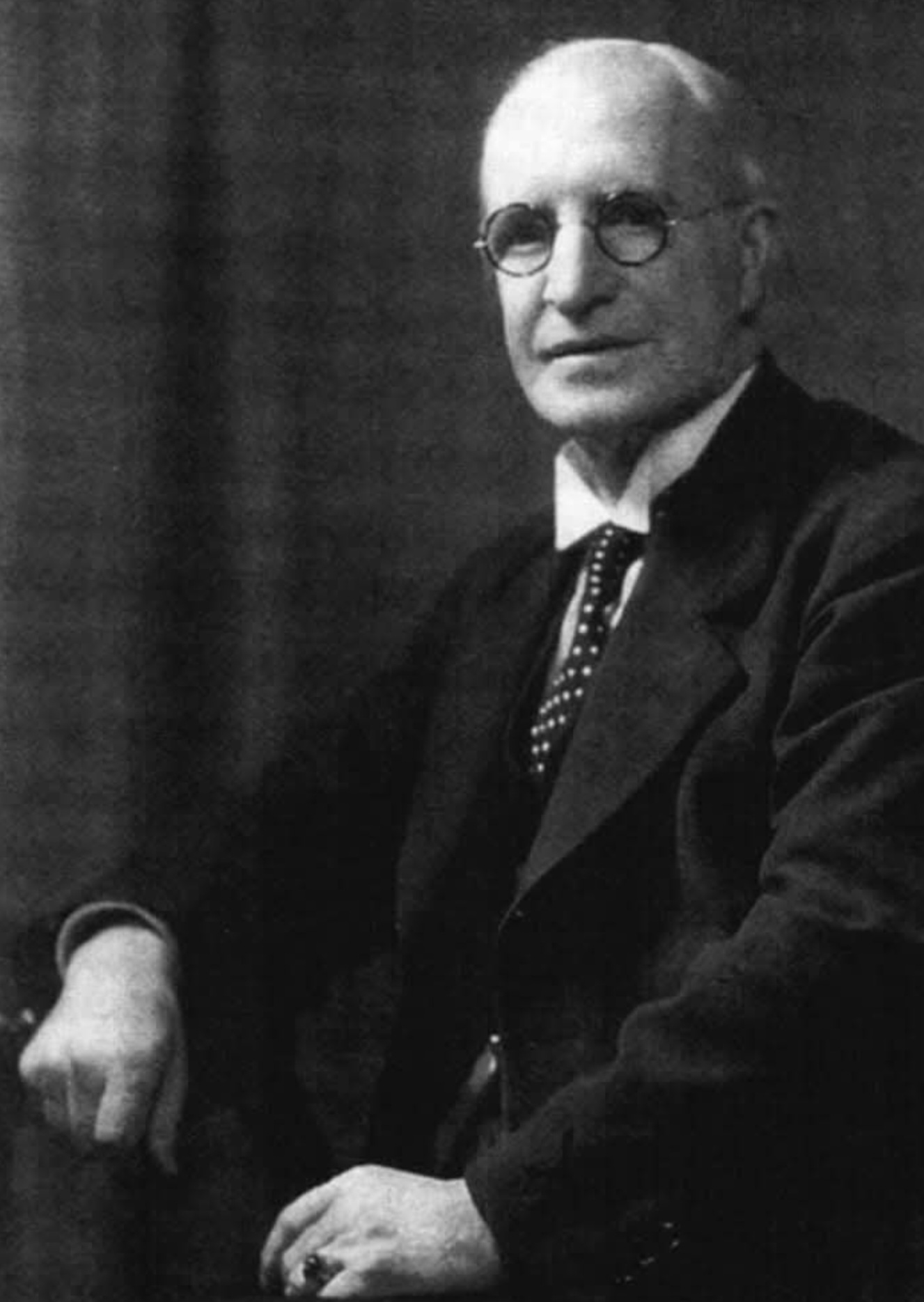
Photo of Tam Shepherd Magician

Tam Shepherds Trick Shop is a magic equipment shop in Glasgow, Scotland. It was established in 1886. On 9 November 2024, its physical shop closed in Glasgow because the building was being redeveloped, after which the business continued as an online retailer.

== Location ==
The shop was located at 33 Queen Street, Glasgow near the site of the former Archaos nightclub.

== History ==
Roy Walton in 2004

The shop was opened in 1886 by Tam Shepherd before being operated by the Walton family.

In 2017, the shop was identified as Glasgow's favourite business at the Glasgow Business Awards. In 2018, the shop hosted the Good £uck art exhibition as part of Glasgow International 2018.

The shop was credited by Jerry Sadowitz for sparking his interest in magic. It was owned by Roy Walton until his death in 2020. Walton managed the shop from 1969 to 2019 before handing management over to his daughters Julia and Sarah.
