= St Enoch Square =

Public square in Glasgow, Scotland

Coordinates: 55.8574°N 4.2553°W

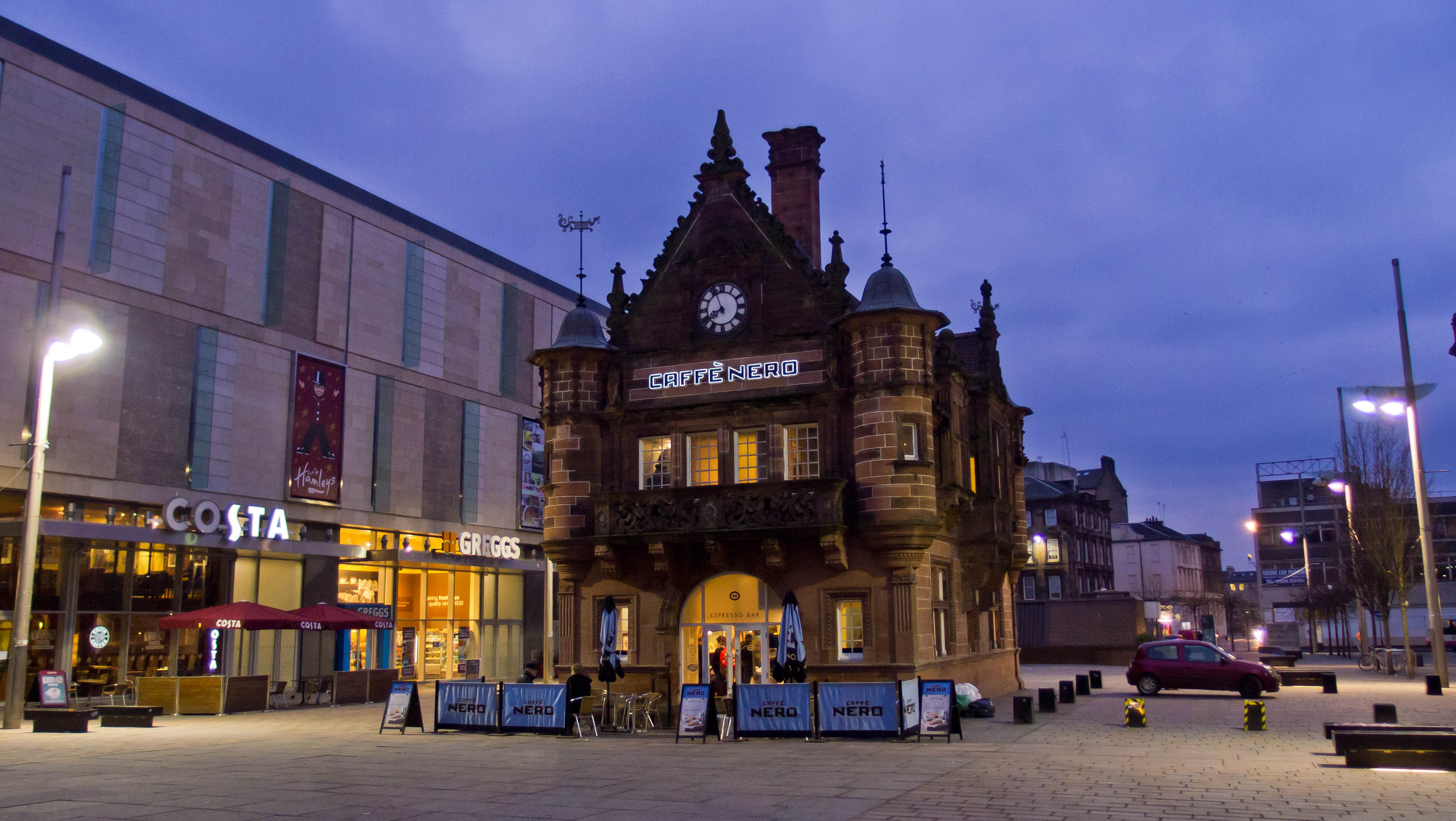
St Enoch Square with the former Subway entrance in the foreground, and St Enoch Centre in the background.

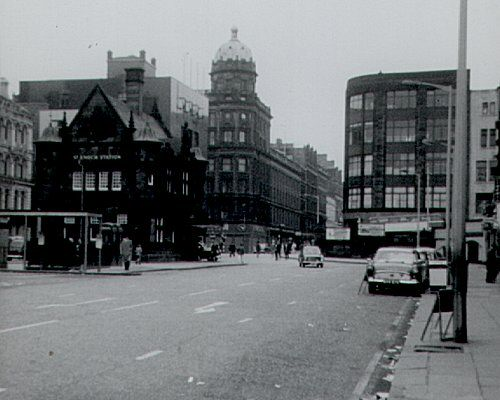
St. Enoch Square in 1966

St. Enoch Square is a public square in Glasgow, Scotland, situated south of the junction of Buchanan Street and Argyle Street, two of the city's busiest shopping streets.

== History ==
The square sits on land that once was the western part of Glasgow Green, alongside the river Clyde, and reportedly had a chapel and burial site of St Thenew (St Enoch) mother of St Kentigern. The site changed hands to the Luke family of goldsmiths, managers of the soaperie in Candleriggs and owners of the glass-works next to the Clyde, who in turn sold it to the Merchants House of Glasgow, and from there to Glasgow City Council who laid the foundation stone of St Enoch Church in 1780. It is one of six squares in the city centre.

The square, always of a quiet and retiring nature then, was joined by grand Regency style buildings between around 1780-1820, the focal point south of the centre being St Enoch's Church, originally designed by James Jaffray in 1780. The church was later substituted for another, this time designed by David Hamilton in 1827. The centre was planted with grass and shrubbery with an iron railing round it, and grazed with sheep. The grass plot remained till about 1860, when it was removed to make way for the farmers, who in that year, were prohibited from meeting in Stockwell Street on the Wednesday market-days. With increasing traffic and a congregation now living further away the church was demolished in 1926, in order to allow space for a bus terminus and car parking.

In the 1860s many streets, of houses, shops, warehouses, restaurants, hotels and inns, and theatres including the Theatre Royal in Dunlop Street, and David Brown`s Royal Music Hall, on the east side were demolished to make way for the railway lines of the Glasgow & South Western Railway Company crossing the Clyde. One of the major buildings on the square, which had to move, was the Faculty and Surgeons Hall of the Royal College of Physicians and Surgeons of Glasgow which moved to new premises 242 St Vincent Street on Blythswood Hill where the College remains today. St. Enoch Station opened in 1876, with its St. Enoch Hotel opening in 1879. The hotel was then the largest hotel in Glasgow, with over 200 bedrooms. The station and hotel were both one of the first buildings to be lit by electricity in the city. The hotel eventually closed in 1974, and was used as a car park until work began on the indoor St. Enoch Centre in 1985, designed by Arup Associates and built by Sir Robert McAlpine & Sons. A £150 million refurbishment programme began in 2005. This work concluded in May 2010. Along with this work, St Enoch Square received an upgrade, transforming the area into a plaza like environment, housing large screens for broadcasting, and generally creating a more pleasant urban area for pedestrians.

Refurbishment of the St Enoch Underground, created in 1896, began in 2014, and was completed in 2015, in an attempt to create a more modern and efficient environment. The £5.3 million contract involved replacing the entrances to the subway with new entrance canopies made of glass and steel, replacement of the floor, wall and ceiling materials, and general upgrading of facilities and equipment.

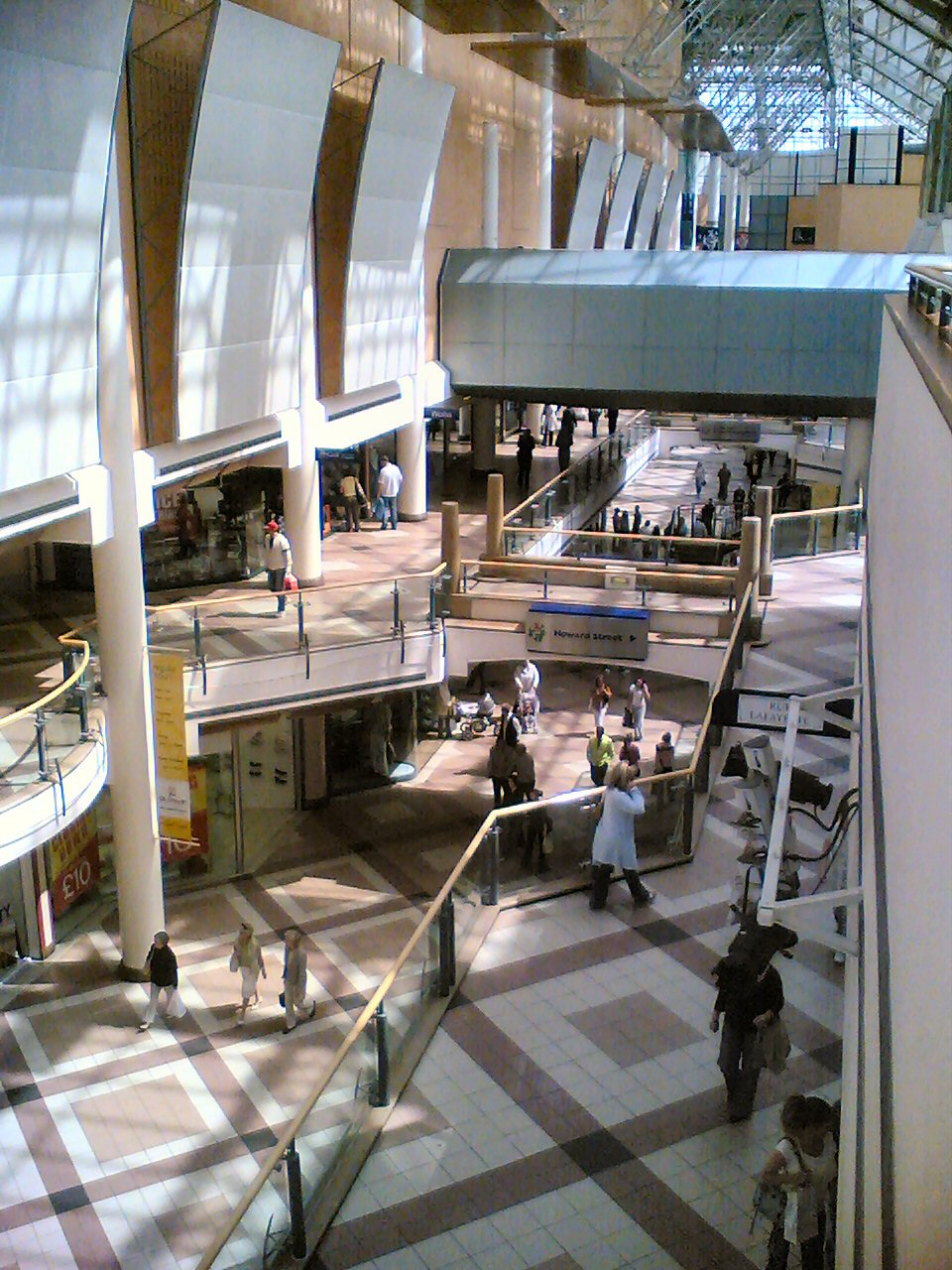
St Enoch Centre, Glasgow

== Architecture ==
Located adjacent to the square is the St Enoch Centre, on the site of the former station and hotel, the largest glass-covered enclosed commercial area in Europe. The current east row, containing the St Enoch Centre buildings, retains a lot of the same architecture as they originally did, barring the storefronts of the many shops along the street level.

The original two-storey Subway ticket office building, designed by James Miller in 1896 for the Glasgow Subway, uses Flemish Renaissance architecture. The masonry is polished ashlar, most distinguished by the use of it in the 4 turrets that are corbelled out at each corner of the building. The original building is now a coffee shop.

The IET Glasgow: Teacher building, used for meetings and offices, but originally the headquarters of whisky distillers William Teacher & Son Ltd designed in 1875 by James Boucher, is on the west side of the square. To the south and into Clyde Street is the A-listed Custom House of Glasgow designed in 1840 by John Taylor at the Broomielaw to collect dues and monitor imports from the expanding shipping traffic. It sits atop the town`s early glass-works.

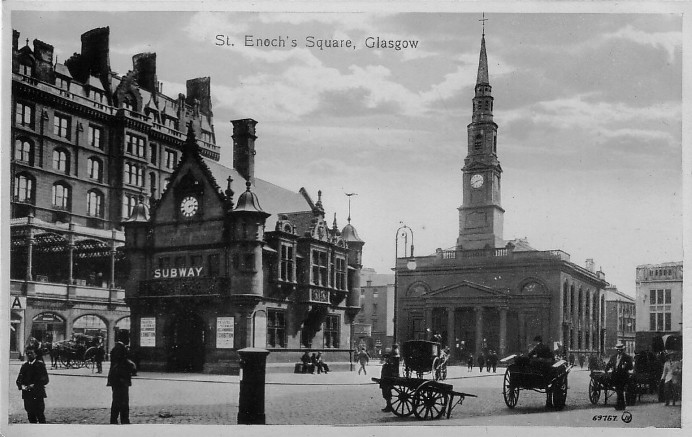
St Enoch Square, Glasgow around 1900 viewing south to the Clyde, with St Enoch Station and Hotel on the left, and St Enoch Church with spire.

== Events ==
Hosted every year between November and December, the Glasgow Christmas Market takes place in St Enoch Square. The event offers continental beers along with mulled wine that are readily served at Continental Bars that will be present during the time.

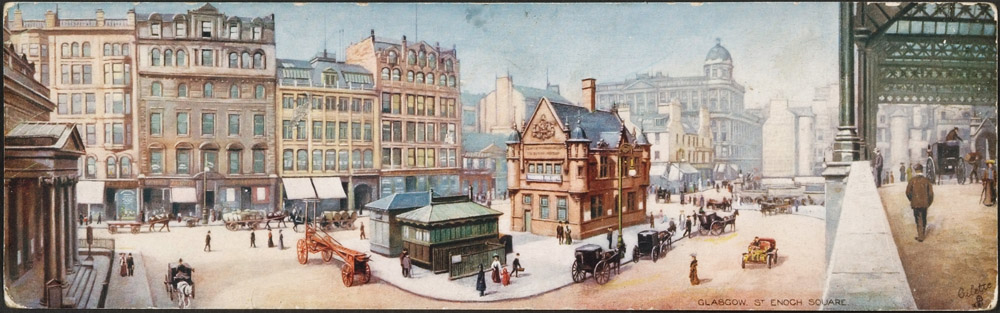
Panorama postcard of St Enoch Square, Glasgow from St Enoch Station, around 1900, looking north to Buchanan Street

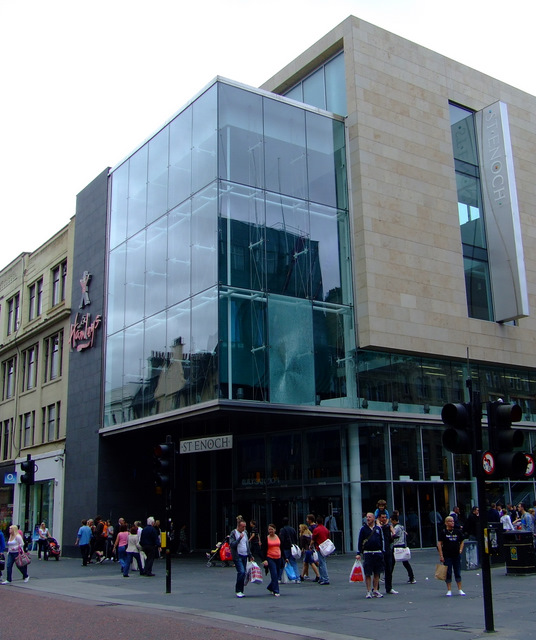
The St Enoch Centre entrance directly from Argyle Street
