= Expensive Shit (play and film) =

Play by Adura Onashile

Expensive Shit is both a 2017 play and a 2020 short film both written and directed by Adura Onashile.

== Production ==
Expensive Shit was written by Adura Onashile, an English playwright of Nigerian descent who lives in Glasgow, Scotland. It was funded by the Scottish Government's Made in Scotland program and debuted at the 70th Edinburgh Festival Fringe.

Onashile's 2020 film of the play debuted at the BFI London Film festival.

== Synopsis ==
Expensive Shit is a fictional play inspired by real events at The Shimmy Club in Glasgow, which was forced to remove one-way mirrors from its women's toilets. The play protagonist is Nigerian toilet attendant Tolu (played by Sabina Cameron in the play, and by Modupe Adeyeye in the film) working in a fictional Glasgow nightclub. Tolu previously worked as a dancer in Fela Kuti's Shrine nightclub in Lagos. While at work, Tolu is pushed by her manager to encourage two women to sexually expose their breasts in the mirror in nightclub's toilets; unbeknown to the women, male customers are watching via the one-way mirror. Tolu is later forced to choose between harming the women or saving herself from the situation.

Themes in the play include women's liberation and exploitative working conditions.

== Critical reception ==
Expensive Shit was nominated for the BAFTA Scotland 2021 for Best Short Film. It also won the audience and the critics award at the Glasgow International Film Festival, and The Scottish Audience Award and The Jury Award at the 2021 Glasgow Short Film Festival. It was praised by Andrea Arhagba writing in Empire for highlighting gender dynamics in nightclubs.

== See also ==
- MeToo movement
