= Roy Walton =

English magician (1932–2020)

- Roy Walton (2004)
- Born: 11 April 1932; London, England
- Died: 4 February 2020 (aged 87); Glasgow, Scotland
- Website: Tam Shepherd's Trick Shop

Roy Walton (11 April 1932 – 4 February 2020) was an English card magic expert.

== Biography ==
First interested in magic at the age of eight, Walton was a world-recognised card magician creating hundreds of card effects, including his most famous effect, Card warp. He mentored numerous Scottish magicians including Jerry Sadowitz, R. Paul Wilson and Peter Duffie.

Many of Walton's pamphlets and other works have been collected in three books on card magic currently published by Lewis Davenport Ltd. of London, and he contributed to several English language magazines on card magic (e.g. Magic magazine and Genii magazine).

He owned Tam Shepherds Trick Shop in Glasgow, where he worked from 1969 to 2019 before handing management over to his daughters Julia and Sarah.

== Death ==
Walton died in Glasgow on 3 February 2020.
