= Stefan King =

Scottish nightclub operator (born 1962)

Stefan Paul King
- Born: October 1962 (age 63)
- Occupation: entertainment magnate

Stefan Paul King (born October 1962) is a Scottish entertainment magnate who founded G1 Group.

== Early life ==
King was born in Glasgow to a Catholic father named George who was a bookmaker and then an alcoholic drinks retailer. His Jewish mother Cynthia was a shop owner before going into business with George King.

King received a private education, finishing high school in 1980, aged 18 years.

== Career ==
In 1981, King launched Ildon Limited, before changing the travel company's name to Kwik Travel, which was successful until 1987 when it went bankrupt. King then opened two sandwich shops, both named No 1 Sandwich Street, before opening gay-nightclub Club X on Royal Exchange Square, Glasgow. His company was called King City Leisure, before later changing the name to G1 Group. Next King opened gay bars Delmonicas, then Cafe Latte and Polo Lounge. King then opened Archaos nightclub, before selling it and opening the Corinthian pub, club and restaurant and then Arta restaurant. During his time of ownership of Archaos, King was accused of breaching the Race Relations Act by the Commission for Racial Equality, with regards to the club's refusal of entry to asian men during a Glasgow Sheriff Court case about the matter. King called the claims "farcical" and the claims were rejected by the court in 2000.

In 2011, King bought the BBC Scotland former headquarters.

== Wealth ==
King is one of the wealthiest people in Scotland, and was the 1,673rd wealthiest person in the United Kingdom in 2009, according to the Sunday Times Rich List. His company, G1 Group, is Scotland's largest hospitality enterprise.

== Personal life ==
King lived with his mother in 1999 and was aged 58 in 2020.

King was described in The Scotsman newspaper as an unlikely pub magnate, as he does not drink alcohol, smoke cigarettes, nor gamble.
