= The Shimmy Club =

Scottish nightclub

- Industry: Entertainment
- Founded: May 2013
- Defunct: 2022
- Area served: Glasgow, Scotland
- Parent: Scotsman Group

The Shimmy Club was a nightclub in Glasgow that operated from 2013 to 2022. The club installed a one-way mirror allowing viewing into the hand washing area of the women's toilets, prompting Glasgow City Council to intervene, forcing the club to temporarily close for a week to rectify the issue.

== The club ==
The Shimmy Club was a nightclub that also hosted disco events for children, located at 25 Royal Exchange Square. It was owned by Scotsman Group, previously known as G1 Group.

== History ==
The club opened on 3 May 2013 and included a one-way mirror enabling patrons in one of the £800-per-night private rooms to view into the hand-washing area of the women's toilets. Shadow Secretary of State for Scotland Margaret Curran called for the police and authorities to take action. Reports about the mirrors made news in New Zealand, Australia, the United States, Qatar, and Portugal. On 14 June 2013 Glasgow Licensing Board forced the club to close for seven days, to remove the one way mirror, and to provide equity training to staff. Police Scotland investigated complaints about the mirrors. In 2016, playwright Adura Onashile wrote the play Expensive Shit based on the events at the club. The play featured at the 70th Edinburgh Festival Fringe.

On 30 March 2022 the club announced it was closing.
