= St. Enoch Centre =

Coordinates: 55.85678°N 4.25301°W

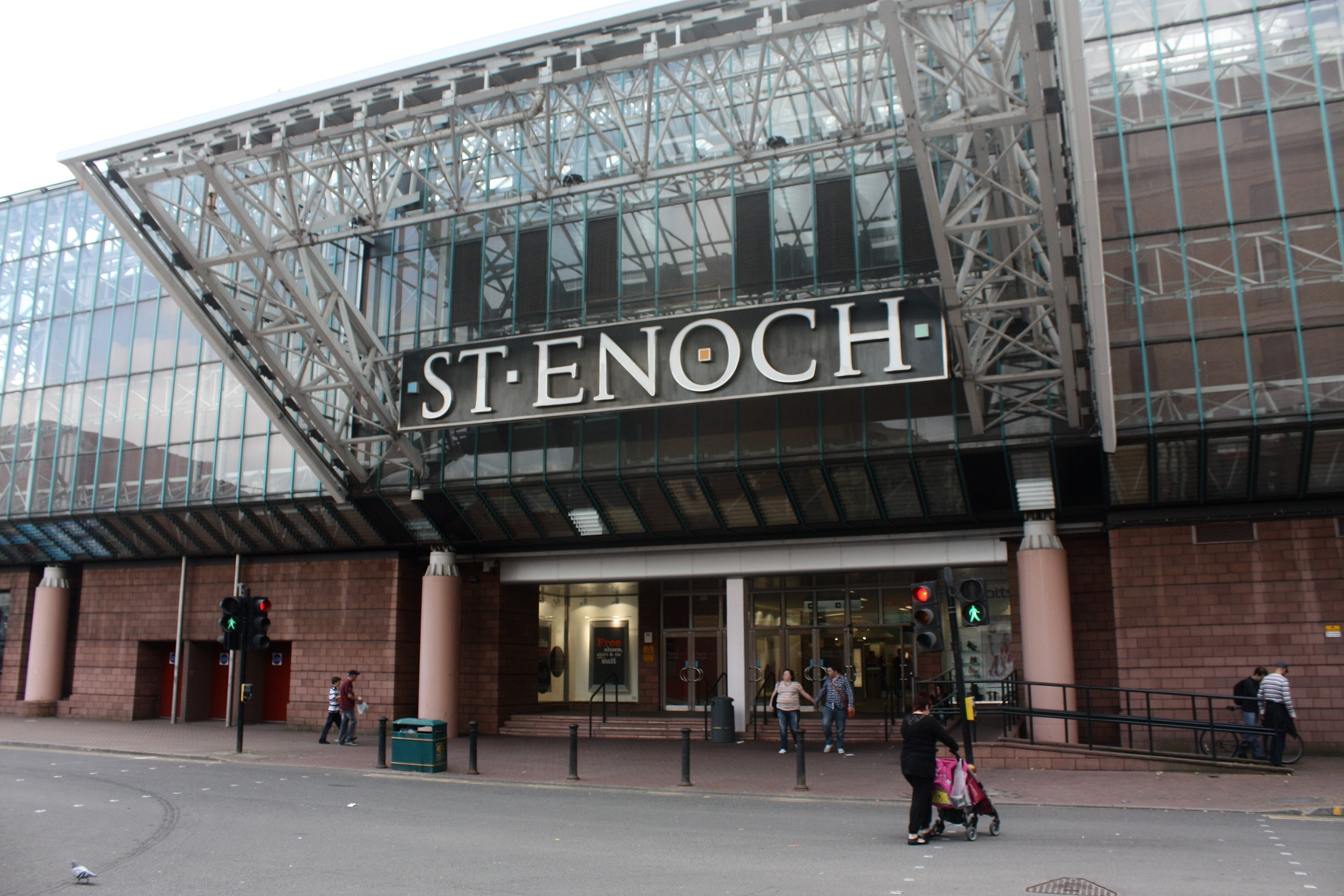
- Location: Glasgow, Scotland
- Opened: May 1989; 37 years ago
- Architect: GMW Architects; Reiach and Hall Architects
- Num. of stores: 86
- Floor area: 70,000 m^{2} (750,000 sq ft)
- Floors: 3
- Public transit: St Enoch subway station Argyle Street railway station

The St. Enoch Centre is an enclosed shopping mall in the centre of Glasgow, Scotland. The centre is located adjacent to St Enoch Square. Designed by GMW Architects and Reiach and Hall Architects, construction began in 1986 by Sir Robert McAlpine, and the mall was opened to the public on 25 May 1989. It was officially opened by the then-Prime Minister, Margaret Thatcher, in February 1990.

Located on the site of the former St Enoch Station, the building is just off Glasgow's famous shopping thoroughfare, Argyle Street and overlooks the historic St. Enoch Square and the original subway station building. The present St Enoch subway station is accessible by escalators.

Whilst the target of many architectural critics, the building is notable for its massive glass roof, which makes it the largest glass-covered enclosed area in Europe. Not only does this substantially reduce heating and lighting loads – the mall area is lit entirely by natural daylight in summer, whilst the solar heat generated by the roof means that mechanical heating is only required for a week on average per year – it also earned the building its affectionate nickname "The Glasgow Greenhouse". The roof's steel framework was fabricated by the shipbuilders Scott Lithgow.

The glass roofed element surrounds a seven-storey car park, and when originally opened, an ice rink. This was closed in 1999 when a refurbishment programme (initiated to compete with the newer Buchanan Galleries complex), saw it being replaced by more shops and an enlarged restaurant area.

== Shopping ==
From opening, St Enoch's anchor tenants were British Home Stores on the eastern end of the complex, and Boots on the western end, adjacent to St Enoch square. Although not part of the mall, there is a link bridge over Osbourne Street to the former Debenhams department store on the north side of the building – this was originally the historic Lewis's store on Argyle Street which itself had undergone a major renovation prior to St Enoch's opening.

== Gallery ==
Images of St Enoch Centre, taken on 31 May 2006

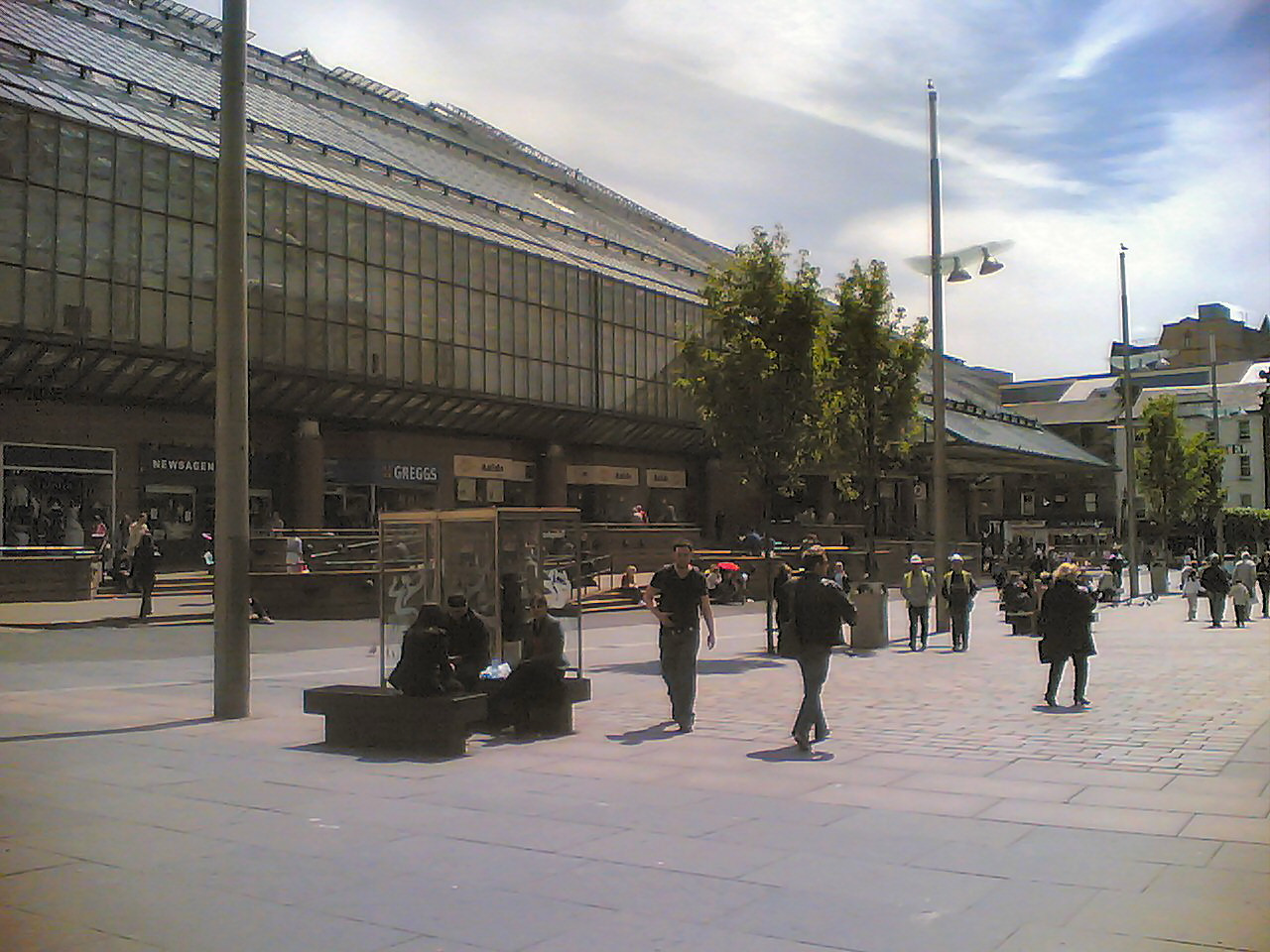
St Enoch Centre from St Enoch Square. This end has since changed significantly following refurbishment a few years later.

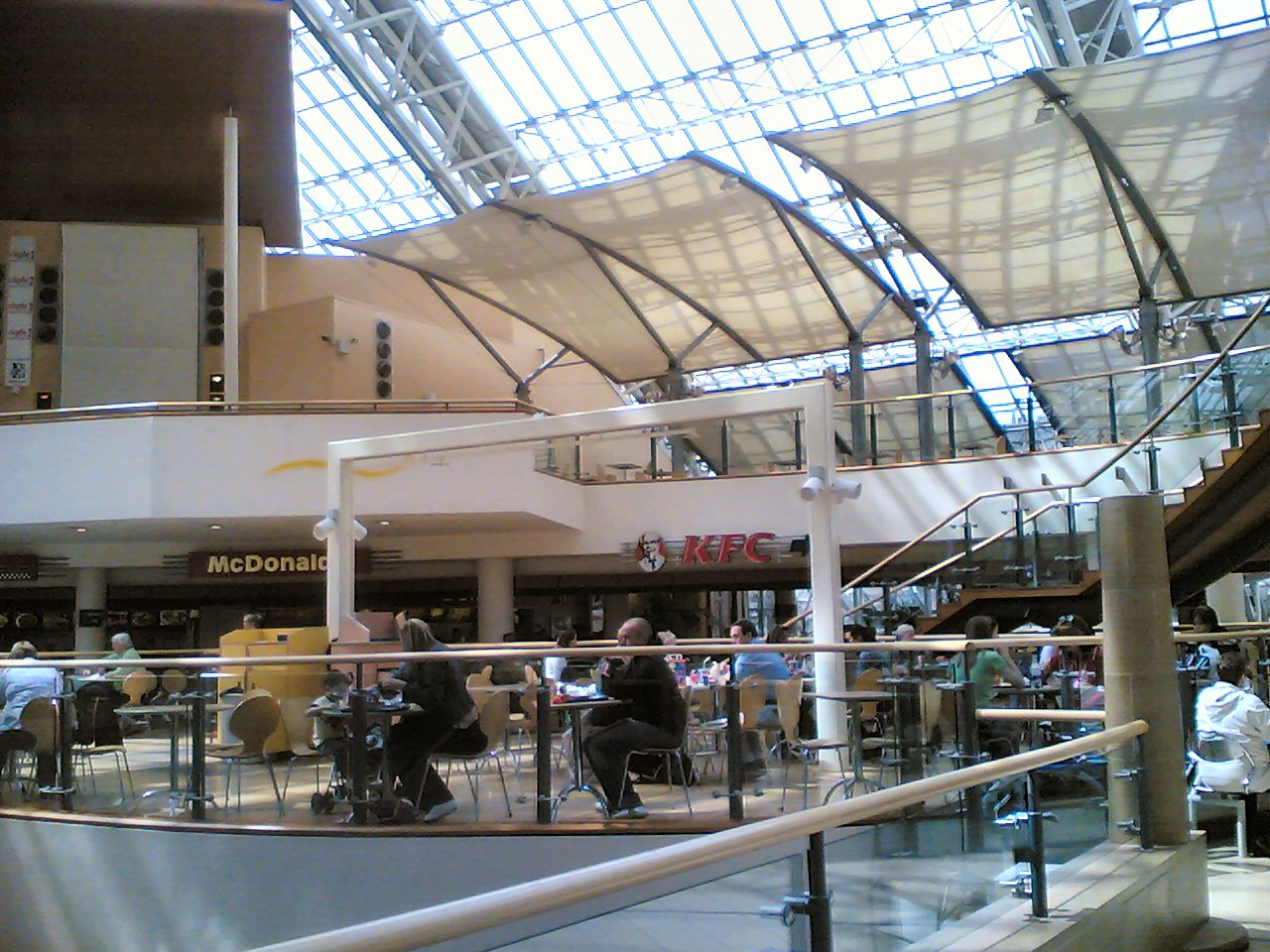
View from upper level

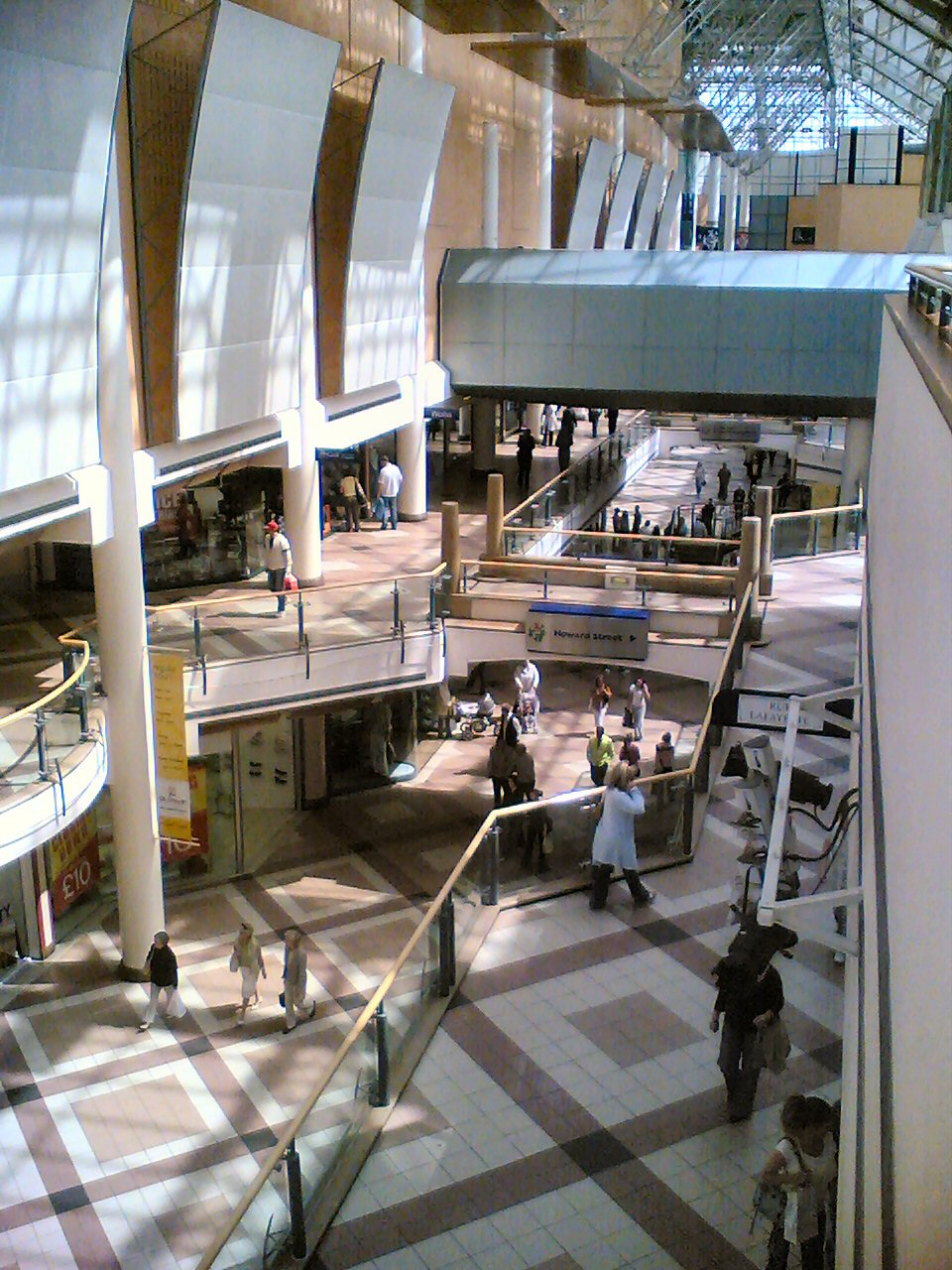
View from upper level

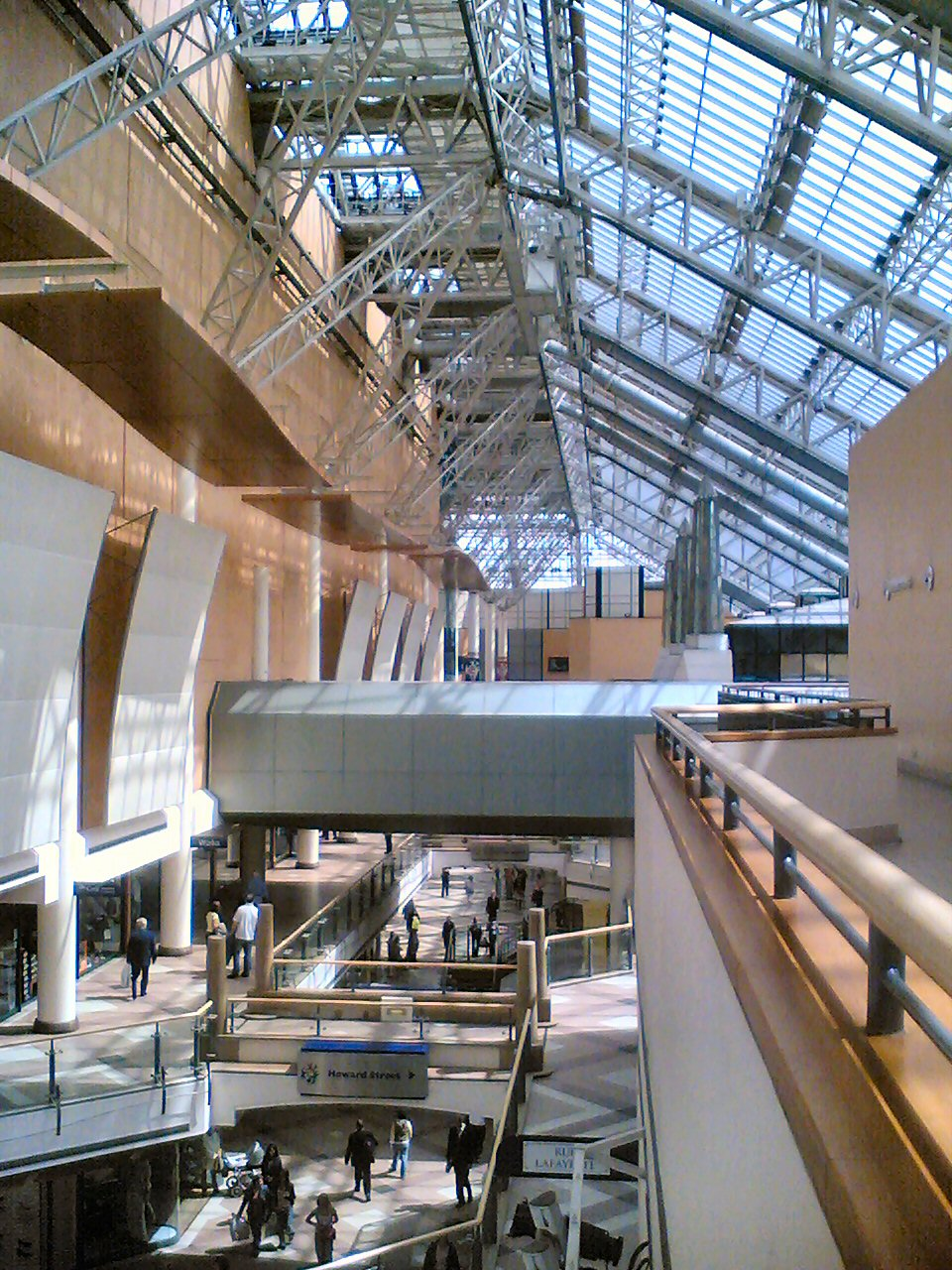
View from upper level

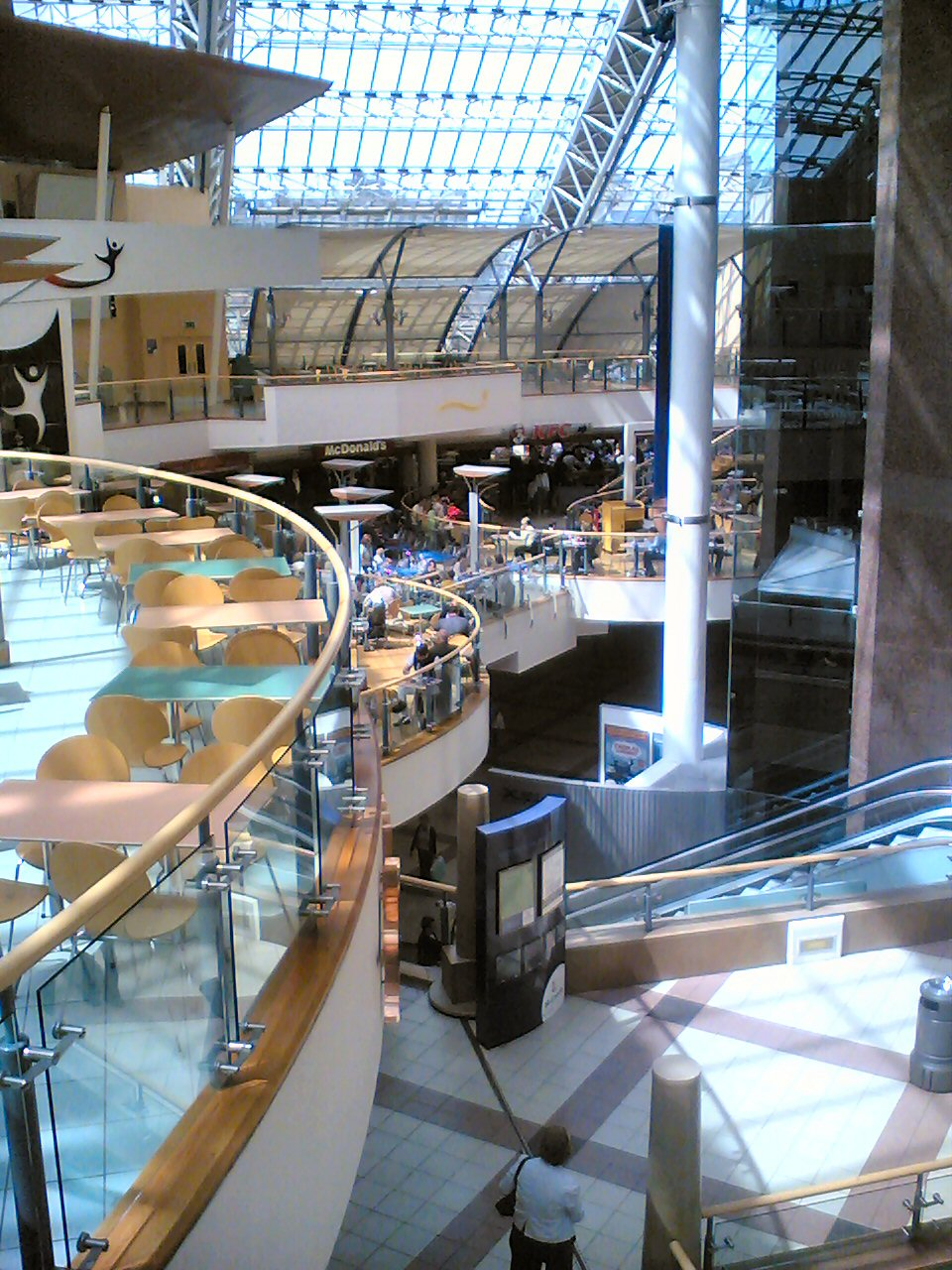
View from upper level

== Refurbishment ==
The mall has undergone two major refurbishments.

=== 2000–2001 ===
Between 2000 and 2001 the ice rink was closed, and converted into an extended food court, and the second floor above the food court area was converted into an entertainment stage. The Argyle Street exit was demolished and rebuilt with an extended mezzanine level housing a TK Maxx store (now closed), and additional shop units with new escalators to serve them. There were other minor updates - the balustrades and handrails were replaced, and the spiral staircase in the centre of the main mall was removed, whilst the hanging wall gardens on the car park exterior walls were replaced by projection screens.

=== 2008–2016 ===
In 2008, a £100 million refurbishment began that was expected to be complete by the end of 2009, but was eventually completed in mid-2010. This refurbishment expanded the floor area to 120,000 m^{2} (1,300,000 sq ft). A new entrance was added at the corner of Argyle Street and Buchanan Street, and the Argyle Street entrance - built in 2000 - was demolished for a second time to make way for a new facade, resulting in the closure of the TK Maxx store. In line with the extensions, the original 1980s floor tiling was replaced and the escalators at both ends of the main mall were moved to different locations and renewed.

Hamleys, G-Star RAW, H&M, Schuh Kids and Starbucks are some of the few new retail units as part of the refurbishment. Initially, the shopping centre is aiming to tender to a more upmarket niche to compete well with the high street and rival mall Buchanan Galleries. The Tesco Metro store formerly on Argyle Street relocated to the lower ground level of the extension, whilst the TK Maxx store that was displaced from the mall relocated to the vacant Tesco site.

St Enoch's Square was also redeveloped to created an enhanced public realm. The units facing the square are now occupied by food outlets, helping to establish it as a vibrant civic hub and making it easier for people to enjoy and use the area.

In 2010, Debenhams renovated its department store as part of the centre’s wider development, which included the addition of a restaurant. The store has since closed.

=== 2016 onwards ===
In 2016, it was confirmed that the former BHS store site would be redeveloped to introduce a multiscreen cinema, alongside new restaurants and retail stores. Work on the redevelopment began in April 2019, and was completed in 2022.

== Demolition ==
On 30 May 2023, Glasgow City Council approved plans to demolish the St Enoch Centre. It will be replaced by a mixed-use development featuring shops, offices, restaurants, and homes. The project will reintroduce streets into the area, including a newly created St Enoch Street to the south and an extended Maxwell Street to the east. Demolition will be carried out in phases over 15 to 20 years, allowing many retailers, restaurants, and leisure operators to remain open during the transition.
