= The Scotsman Hotel =

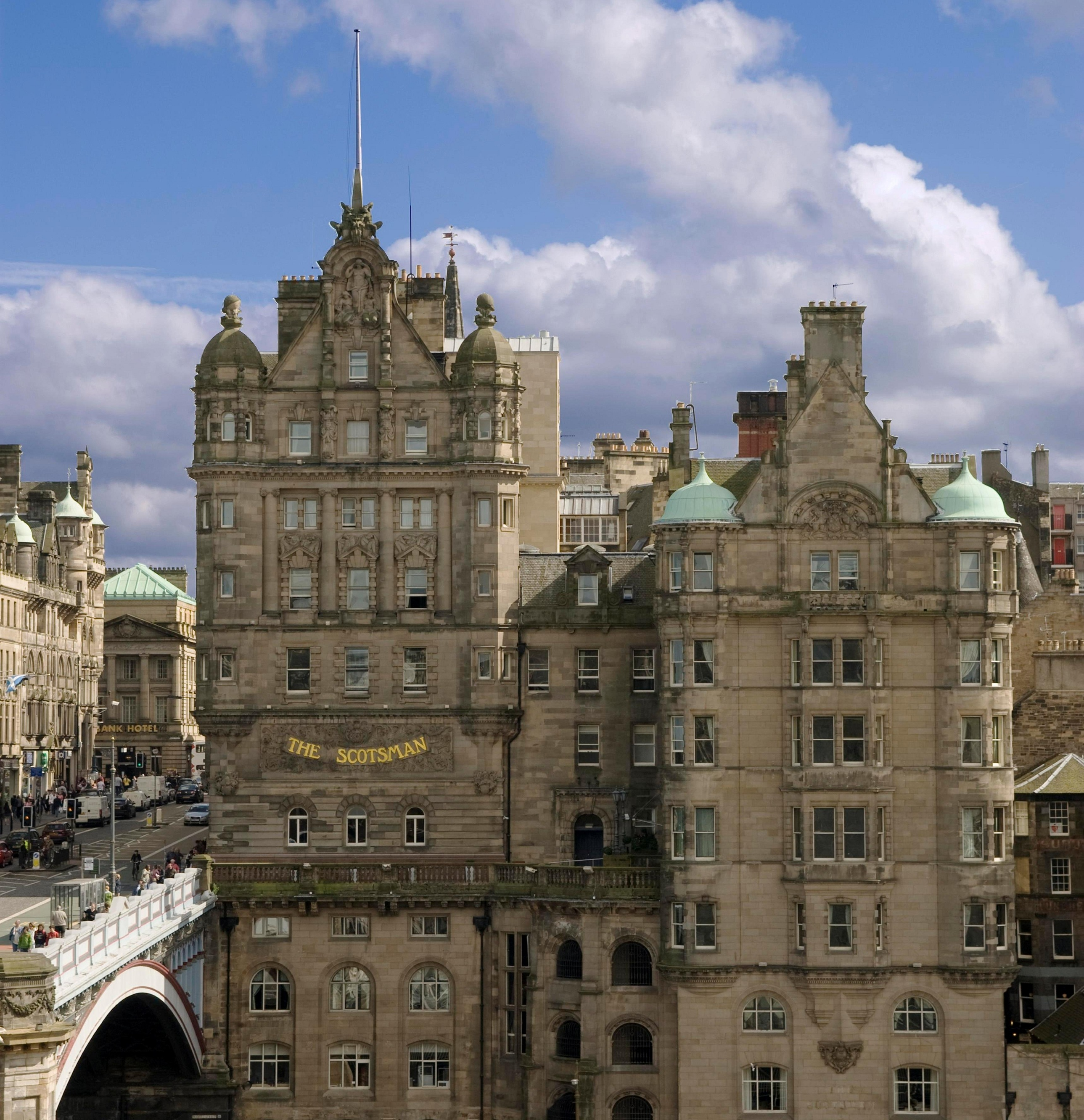
- The north elevation of The Scotsman Hotel
- Interactive map of the The Scotsman Hotel area

General information
- Status: Completed
- Type: Hotel
- Architectural style: Scots Renaissance
- Location: 20 North Bridge; Edinburgh; EH1 1TR
- Coordinates: 55°57′4″N 3°11′17″W
- Named for: The Scotsman
- Construction started: 1899
- Completed: 1902
- Opened: 2001; 25 years ago
- Client: John Ritchie & Co
- Owner: Scotsman Group

Technical details
- Floor count: 10

Design and construction
- Architects: James Dunn and James Finlay

Other information
- Number of rooms: 56
- Number of suites: 13
- Number of restaurants: 1 (Grande Cafe)
- Number of bars: 1 (The Hide)
- Public transit: St Andrew Square; Edinburgh Waverley

Website
- scotsmanhotel.co.uk

Listed Building – Category A
- Official name: 20-52 (Even Nos) North Bridge including Scotsman Hotel, Scotsman Steps, Arcade, Royal Mile Mansions, 175 and 177 High Street and 65-71 (Odd Nos) Cockburn Street
- Designated: 12 December 1974
- Reference no.: LB30143

The Scotsman Hotel located in Edinburgh, Scotland, opened in 2001 in the Edwardian (1905) building which had housed The Scotsman newspaper for nearly a century. The hotel is located on North Bridge.

== Ownership ==
The Scotsman was previously part of JJW Hotels & Resorts and was purchased by Sheikh Mohamed bin Issa Al Jaber for £63 million in 2006. In August 2007, JJW acquired The Eton Collection.

The hotel went into liquidation in June 2016 and was sold to the G1 Group for an undisclosed amount in February 2017.

== Building history ==
In the 1900s the North Bridge running between the New and Old Towns of Edinburgh was widened and as part of this expansion a 190-foot-high tower was built, into which The Scotsman newspaper moved their offices. The building, designed by Dunn & Findlay, cost around £500,000 and after the rest of the North Bridge extension was completed teamed with the Carlton directly opposite, it formed an imposing entrance to the Old Town.

The direct access from Market Street to the building was an ideal distribution outlet for the papers to be packed directly onto the trains at Edinburgh Waverley railway station straight from the printing house that took up the entire basement. The middle floors of the building were originally used for the editorial offices. The current penthouse used to be the Pigeon lofts. The site now occupied by the North Bridge Brasserie originally held the reception and trading rooms where bartering over advertising took place.

In 2001, the Newspaper moved to their own purpose-built offices in Holyrood and the building was renovated into The Scotsman Hotel. In 2017, the hotel was purchased by G1 Group.

== Ghosts ==
In a link to its time as former offices of the Edinburgh Evening News, the building is reported to be "haunted by a host of ghosts, including a phantom printer and a phantom forger."

== Awards ==
- Boutique Hotel Of The Year Award – 2020 Scottish Hotel Awards
- Hotel Design Gold Laurel – 2020 Scottish Hotel Awards
- Voted one of the top hotels in the world – Condé Nast Traveler, 2007
- Voted one of the top hotels in the world – Departures
- Nominated Hotel of the Year – The AA, 2002
- One of the Top UK Business Hotels – Condé Nast Traveler, 2007
- One of the Top 20 UK hotels – Tatler, 2004
- Simon Fraser was awarded Rising Star Restaurant Manager of the Year – Scottish Hotels of the Year Awards 2008
- Hotel is a member of The Preferred Hotel Group
