= 2014 Glasgow bin lorry crash =

2014 fatal incident in Scotland

Glasgow bin lorry crash
- View down Queen Street towards George Square shortly after the accident
- Date: 22 December 2014
- Time: 14:30 GMT
- Location: Queen Street, Glasgow, Scotland; 55°51′36″N 04°15′06″W
- Deaths: 6
- Injuries: 15

On 22 December 2014 a bin lorry collided with pedestrians in the city centre of Glasgow, Scotland, killing six and injuring fifteen others. The driver of the council-owned vehicle, Harry Clarke, said he had passed out at the wheel. A similar blackout had happened to him in the driving seat of a bus. He had not disclosed that incident on his heavy goods vehicle licence renewal application, despite such self-reporting being mandatory. Clarke was officially told he would not face further prosecution, causing protests from victims' families at the way the case had been handled.

In October 2015 it was reported that Clarke had been arrested on suspicion of driving without a licence in September 2015.

Four years previously, two pedestrians were killed in the city when a driver experienced a 'blackout' while driving and drove into them on the pavement.

== Incident ==
The accident occurred in Queen Street at around 14:30 GMT. The 26-tonne vehicle was being driven by 58-year-old Harry Clarke, with two crew members seated in the rear compartment, separated from the front by a railing. While travelling north, Clarke blacked out just after the traffic lights at the Gallery of Modern Art. After mounting the pavement the lorry travelled for 19 seconds, striking pedestrians, initially accelerating to 25 mph (40 km/h) before dropping to 19 mph (31 km/h) and 10 mph (16 km/h) as it struck walls and other street furniture. It came to rest part-way into an alley between the entrance to Glasgow Queen Street railway station and a hotel. The pedestrian collisions resulted in six deaths and 15 injuries. The six dead were a family of three from Dumbarton (18-year-old Erin McQuade and her grandparents, Jack and Lorraine Sweeney); two Glaswegian women, 29-year-old Stephenie Tait and 51-year-old Jacqueline Morton; and 52-year-old Gillian Ewing, originally from Edinburgh.

Rail services at the station continued and were accessed through alternative entrances in Dundas and North Hanover Streets.

== Investigation ==
At a meeting between representatives of Police Scotland, the Crown Office and Procurator Fiscal Service (COPFS), the Health and Safety Executive and others the day after the accident, it was concluded that the incident was to be treated as a road traffic accident and thus should be investigated by the police as the proper regulator (as opposed to the HSE for any offences under Health and Safety law).

Having been admitted to the Western Infirmary after the crash, Clarke was discharged on 7 January 2015. He was eventually diagnosed as having suffered neurocardiogenic syncope, a fainting episode caused by drop in blood pressure. He waived the anonymity he was given immediately after the incident and released a statement in a newspaper on 5 February to the effect that he had been unconscious and had no memory of the crash.

After the police investigation, which did not involve Clarke giving a police statement, on 25 February 2015 the Crown Office concluded that no criminal charges would be brought against either Clarke or the council. It had been determined that as he was unconscious Clarke did not "have the necessary criminal state of mind required for a criminal prosecution" and also that no breaches of Health and Safety law had occurred. It was, however, decided that a fatal accident inquiry (FAI) would be held to determine the cause of the crash and establish what lessons could be learned. The inquiry would examine three main aspects – Clarke's health and training, the safety of the vehicle and the safety of the route.

On 25 June 2015 the Driver and Vehicle Licensing Agency (DVLA) withdrew Clarke's car-driving licence for medical reasons and banned him from driving heavy goods vehicles (HGVs) for ten years.

The inquiry began at Glasgow Sheriff Court on 22 July 2015 before Sheriff John Beckett QC. Evidence to the inquiry found there were no mechanical faults with the vehicle and that the other two crew members would have been unable to apply the handbrake because they were wearing their seatbelts. No other safety devices were fitted to the vehicle that would have allowed a crew member not in the driver's seat to stop the vehicle.

The inquiry also revealed that Clarke's medical history contained episodes of dizziness and fainting dating from the 1970s and that he had previously suffered a blackout while at the wheel of a First Glasgow bus, which was in service but stationary at a bus stop. It was stated that Clarke had been passed fit to return to work as a bus driver owing to failures by both the bus company's doctor and Clarke's general practitioner (GP) to spot that Clarke had changed his account of events, telling the GP that the episode had occurred in the canteen, which the GP then attributed to the hot conditions and deemed to be unlikely to be repeated.

The inquiry further found that Clarke had subsequently lied about this medical history, both when he applied for a large goods vehicle (LGV) licence from the DVLA in Swansea and in his job application to Glasgow City Council. As a result, Clarke was suspended by the council on 6 August 2015. In giving evidence the DVLA admitted its self-declaration system had a weakness, since it allowed applicants to be assessed by either an employer-appointed occupational-health doctor or their own GP, and occupational-health doctors would not usually have access to the applicant's medical records.

In August 2015 the head of the inquiry reiterated that the February 2015 decision not to file criminal charges still stood, clarifying that "this covered all aspects of Mr Clarke's driving and any false information he had given to doctors, the DVLA and Glasgow City Council about his medical history." This was followed by confirmation that a possible prosecution in the jurisdiction of England and Wales by the DVLA for the non-disclosure to them would not be pursued either.

During the fifth week of the inquiry, with Clarke still to give evidence, the family of one of the dead applied for an adjournment of up to three months in order to pursue a private prosecution against Clarke for dangerous driving, on the basis that the evidence so far showed unfitness to drive owing to a medical condition. The move was opposed by the family of one of the other victims but supported by those of the remaining four.

After further discussions with the other families they decided to drop the motion while still intending to pursue the private prosecution. A subsequent motion by Clarke's lawyer to have the inquiry halted was dismissed as being against the public interest. Owing to the prospect of the private prosecution, when the inquiry resumed Clarke was warned by the Sheriff that he did not have to answer incriminating questions. On giving evidence Clarke declined to answer all questions save some that dealt with his recollections of the crash, leading to some of the families walking out of the inquiry.

The inquiry was adjourned on 28 August, with the Sheriff anticipating reporting his findings by January 2016, although this could be delayed if it were deemed it would be prejudicial to the planned private prosecution. Upon closure the Lord Advocate, Frank Mulholland, reiterated the defence of the decision not to prosecute Clarke for the reasons previously given, explaining that the decision had been based on the fact the Crown would have had to prove Clarke would have known he was unfit to drive, something they doubted could be done based on a number of factors – his four-year history of episode-free driving after the 2010 incident, the fact that First Glasgow's occupational-health doctor had cleared him to drive after the 2010 incident and told him he need not notify the DVLA and the fact that First had given the council an acceptable reference. Citing DVLA procedures, he also pointed out that even if the DVLA had been notified of the 2010 incident "the worst that could have happened" was a maximum 12-month suspension and a return of his licence if there were no further concerns, and that the DVLA had returned Clarke's licence even after the 2014 crash. Based on this lack of evidence, he cast doubt on the prospect of a court granting authority for a private prosecution. The inquiry determined that no reference from First to the council could be found despite a detailed search.

On 4 October 2015 Clarke was arrested for allegedly driving a car on 20 September, in contravention of the withdrawal his car licence in June. He resigned from his post on 30 October, shortly before he was due to attend a disciplinary hearing to consider reports that he had failed to disclose issues in relation to his health.

On 9 December 2016, the bereaved families were told that private prosecution for Clarke has been ruled out.

== Vehicle ==
In January 2018, an investigation by SWD Media found that Glasgow City Council was still in possession of the green DAF CF 75-310 bin lorry. The vehicle was purchased in April 2016 for an undisclosed fee – the lorry's lease had been due to end on 22 March 2018.

The vehicle had been stored in a secret location since the Fatal Accident Enquiry concluded in December 2015 and although repairable, council chiefs had always hoped to buy the vehicle outright and scrap it out of respect to the victims’ families. A council spokesman confirmed: "Our position remains the same – we feel it is inappropriate to put the vehicle back on the road".

== Reactions ==
Scottish First Minister Nicola Sturgeon gave a statement following the accident saying that her "thoughts are with everyone involved in this tragic incident, and especially with the friends and families of the six people who lost their lives in what is another sad day for Glasgow and Scotland".

The Scottish Labour leader, Jim Murphy, the Scottish Conservative leader, Ruth Davidson, the Prime Minister, David Cameron, the Opposition leader, Ed Miliband, Queen Elizabeth II and leading Scottish religious figures all publicly expressed their condolences. Many compared it to the helicopter crash in the city the previous December.

=== Bereaved families ===
In a BBC television documentary broadcast, relatives of the victims and survivors of the incident maintained that they had been told by a Crown Office official in one to one meetings that Clarke's prior blackout happened in a canteen, instead the driving seat of a bus, and that his obesity and lack of intelligence were major factors in not charging him.

== Memorials ==
On the day following the crash all flags on Scottish Government buildings were flown at half-mast; the Christmas lights on George Square were switched off and the attractions closed as a mark of respect. A special service was held in St George's–Tron Church the same day. Further special services were held at Glasgow's St Andrew's Cathedral and Glasgow Cathedral on 24 December.

An appeal fund for the victims was set up with initial contributions from the Scottish Government, Glasgow City Council and the office of the Lord Provost of Glasgow.

== Previous similar incident ==
In the aftermath of the incident, media attention drew parallels with a similar previous fatalities to pedestrians in Glasgow city centre, in which two girls were killed on a 2010 Christmas shopping trip by a Range Rover that hit them on the pavement in North Hanover Street. The mothers said they were still waiting for the Crown Office to do their job. Charges against the driver of the Range Rover, a 53-year-old man, were dropped. He testified at an official inquiry that prior to the incident in which the girls were killed he had suffered blackouts, and the deaths were as a result of him suffering a loss of consciousness owing to an undiagnosed medical condition, which he had failed to disclose when submitting his driving licence application. The case received a great deal of newspaper and television publicity when the inquiry ended in November 2014 and the bereaved families called for him to face charges.
