= Archaos (nightclub) =

Scottish nightclub

Archaos was a Glasgow nightclub that closed in 2007.

== Location ==
Archoas was located in the Grade A listed building on 21-41 Queen Street, Glasgow and covered 3,240 square metres. Prior to this, the building had been a burger restaurant based on Buck Rogers in the 25th Century, but had closed down in 1983 after owner Brian Waldman had failed to renew the rights from ITV and had a` failed rebranding under the name of "Bucks".

The three-level club centred around a dance-floor with balconies around it.

Within the club was the Skye bar, which was described by The Caterer as "a club within a club".

== Ownership ==
The club was owned by Stefan King.

== History ==
The club opened around 1995. It was noted for its parties, student focussed nights, and events catering to customers aged under eighteen years old. Unlike other clubs where disc-jockeys carefully mixed records, Archaos' disc-jockeys had a reputation for simply playing one track after another. Each of the three levels played different music, with the lower floor catering to the music tastes of students, the middle floor incorporating a round dance floor, and the top floor playing electronic dance music and featuring dancers hanging from the ceiling.

Notable customers included; Charlie Sheen and Paul Gascoigne in 1997.

In 1999, television show "Top of the Pops" broadcast an episode featuring the alternative rock band Texas and was the first ever episode of the show to be broadcast outside of its designated studio. The same year the club's management was accused of discriminating against Asian men by the Commission for Racial Equality in their submission to Glasgow Sheriff Court. Club owner Stefan King called the claims "farcical." The claims were rejected by the court in 2000.

A 19 year old man was stabbed in the club on March 12, 2004. The club closed in 2007, and, as of 2022, the building has been unused since. Property development company, CA Ventures discussed turning the site into student accommodation in 2022. Earlier plans to convert the location into another nightclub and an office were not realised.
