= Adura Onashile =

British actor and playwright

- Born: London
- Occupations: Actor, director
- Notable work: Expensive Shit (2013 play and 2020 film)

Adura Onashile is a British actor, playwright, and director. She wrote and directed the 2013 play Expensive Shit and adapted it into a film in 2020.

== Early life ==
Onashile is of Nigerian descent and was born in London, England.

== Career ==
Onashile starred in the Edinburgh Fringe Festival play Roadkill and again at the 2013 Festival in her play HeLa about Henrietta Lacks.

She has worked with the National Theatre of Scotland, The Royal Shakespeare Company, The Lyceum, The National, and the Young Vic theatres.

Her 2013 play Expensive Shit addresses themes of sexual exploitation and precarious work, drawing inspiration from real life events at The Shimmy Club in Glasgow, by then her hometown. After Expensive Shit was made into a short film, it debuted at the BFI London Film Festival in 2020 and was shortlisted for a BAFTA Scotland award for short documentaries. It was praised by Andrea Arhagba writing in Empire for highlighting gender dynamics in nightclubs. Expensive Shit won the audience and the critics award at the Glasgow International Film Festival.

Her 2021 immersive theatrical production of Ghosts was created with the National Theatre of Scotland and incorporates augmented reality delivered via app that informs the audience of the history of slavery in Glasgow. In 2022, she produced the film Girl, which stars Déborah Lukumuena. New Europe Film Sales bought the rights to Girl later the same year. Also in 2022, she started in Liz Lochhead's Scots language production of Medea.

== Personal life ==
As of 2023, Onashile lives in Glasgow.
