= Queen Street, Glasgow =

Street in Glasgow, Scotland

Coordinates: 55.85969°N 4.25202°W

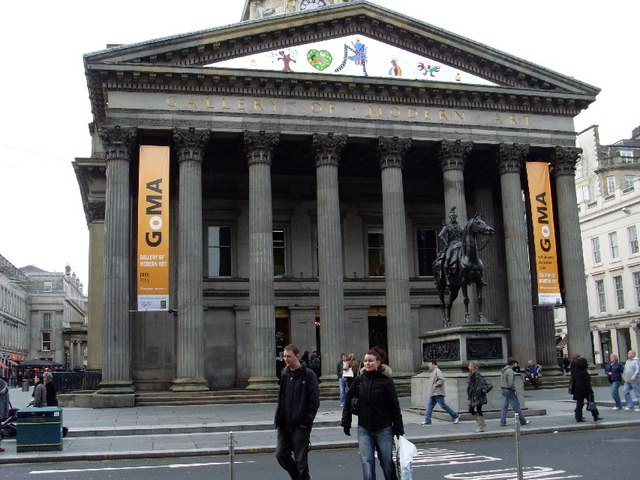
Gallery of Modern Art and Royal Exchange Square viewed from the intersection of Queen Street and Ingram Street.

Queen Street is one of the major thoroughfares in the city of Glasgow, Scotland. The street runs north from Argyle Street (parallel to nearby Buchanan Street) until it reaches George Square at the junction with St. Vincent Street. Several local landmarks are located on this street including Royal Exchange Square, with the Gallery of Modern Art at the junction with Ingram Street.

George Square is at the northern end of the street, as is Queen Street Station, the second busiest railway station in Glasgow. With several major streets in the city centre pedestrianised, Queen Street and Ingram Street form part of a major taxi and bus corridor for services travelling to the eastern and southern parts of the city.

== See also ==
- 2014 Glasgow bin lorry crash
- Glasgow Queen Street railway station
- List of Category A listed buildings in Glasgow
- Merchant City
- Tam Shepherds Trick Shop
