= North Bridge, Edinburgh =

Road bridge and street in Edinburgh linking the High Street with Princes Street

North Bridge
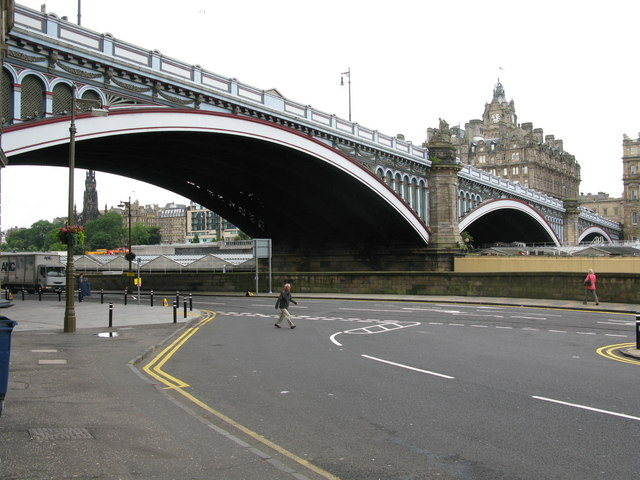
- Bridge in 2008
- Coordinates: 55.95187°N 3.18840°W
- OS grid reference: NT 25888 73842
- Locale: Edinburgh

Characteristics
- Design: Arch

Listed Building – Category A
- Official name: North Bridge
- Designated: 12 December 1974
- Reference no.: LB30035

Location
- Interactive map of North Bridge

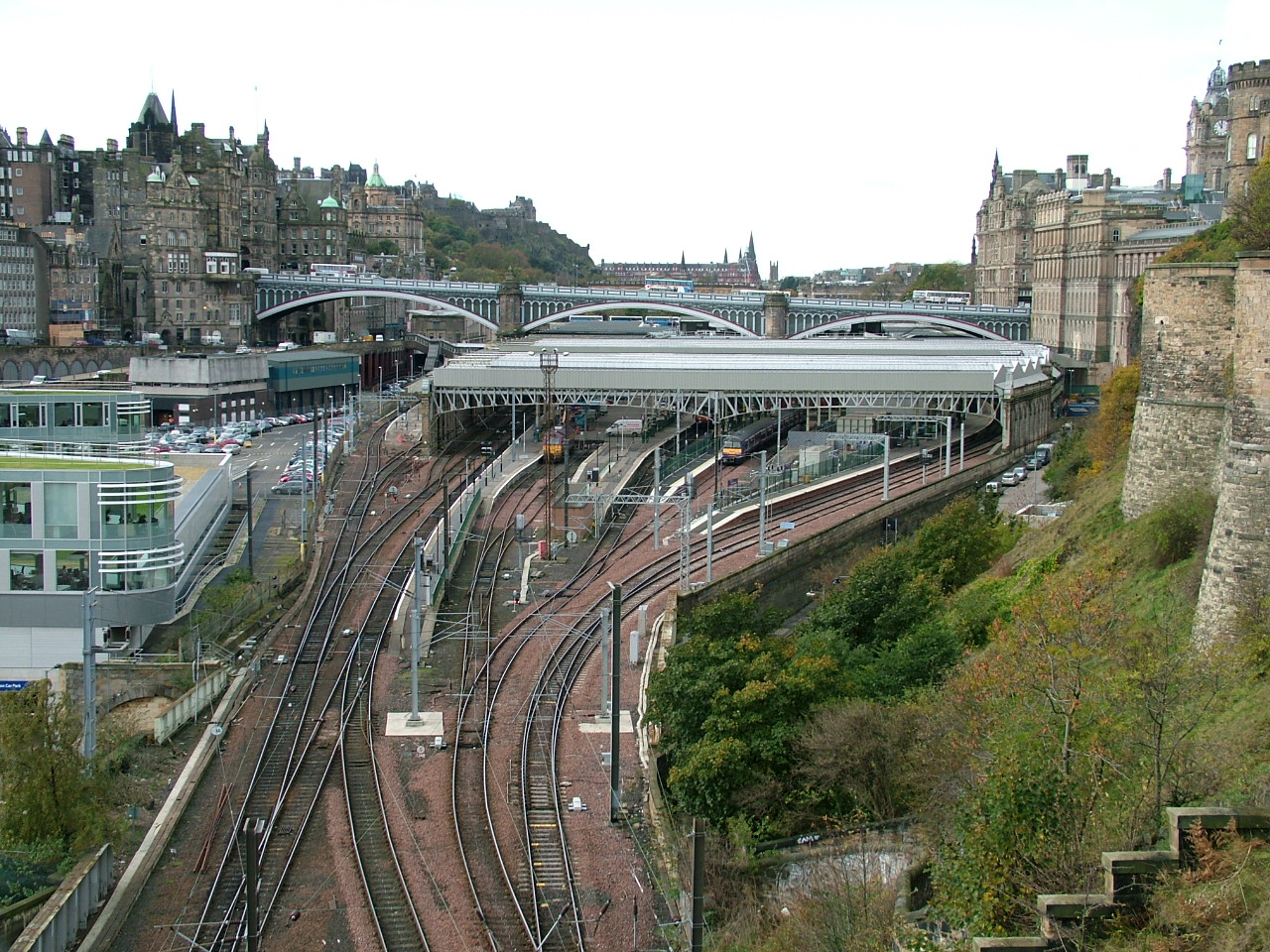
North Bridge, above Waverley Station, from the East

North Bridge is a road bridge and street in Edinburgh linking the High Street with Princes Street, and the Old Town with the New Town. The current bridge was built between 1894 and 1897. A previous North Bridge, built between 1763 and 1772, stood until 1896. Significant works to refurbish the bridge were carried out between 2018 and 2026.

== First North Bridge ==
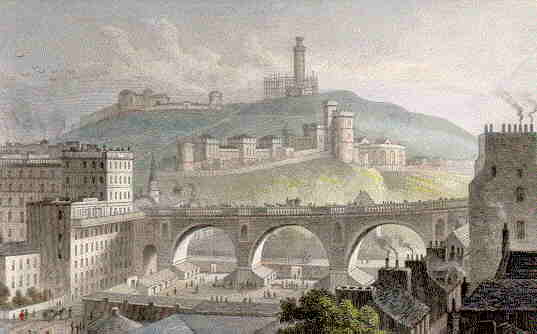
The old North Bridge, from the west, with Calton Hill in the background, in 1829

The first stone of the original bridge was laid on 21 October 1763 by the Lord Provost, George Drummond, a driving force behind the modernisation of Edinburgh. In that year, the North Loch, which separated the New from the Old Town, was drained, and the mud removed. But, though the erection of the bridge was resolved upon at that time, the contract for building the bridge was not signed till 21 August 1765. The parties to this contract were the town council of Edinburgh, and William Mylne, architect, brother to Robert Mylne. The sum agreed for was £10,140; the work was to be completed before Martinmas (11 November) 1769, and Mylne was to guarantee the works for a period of ten years.

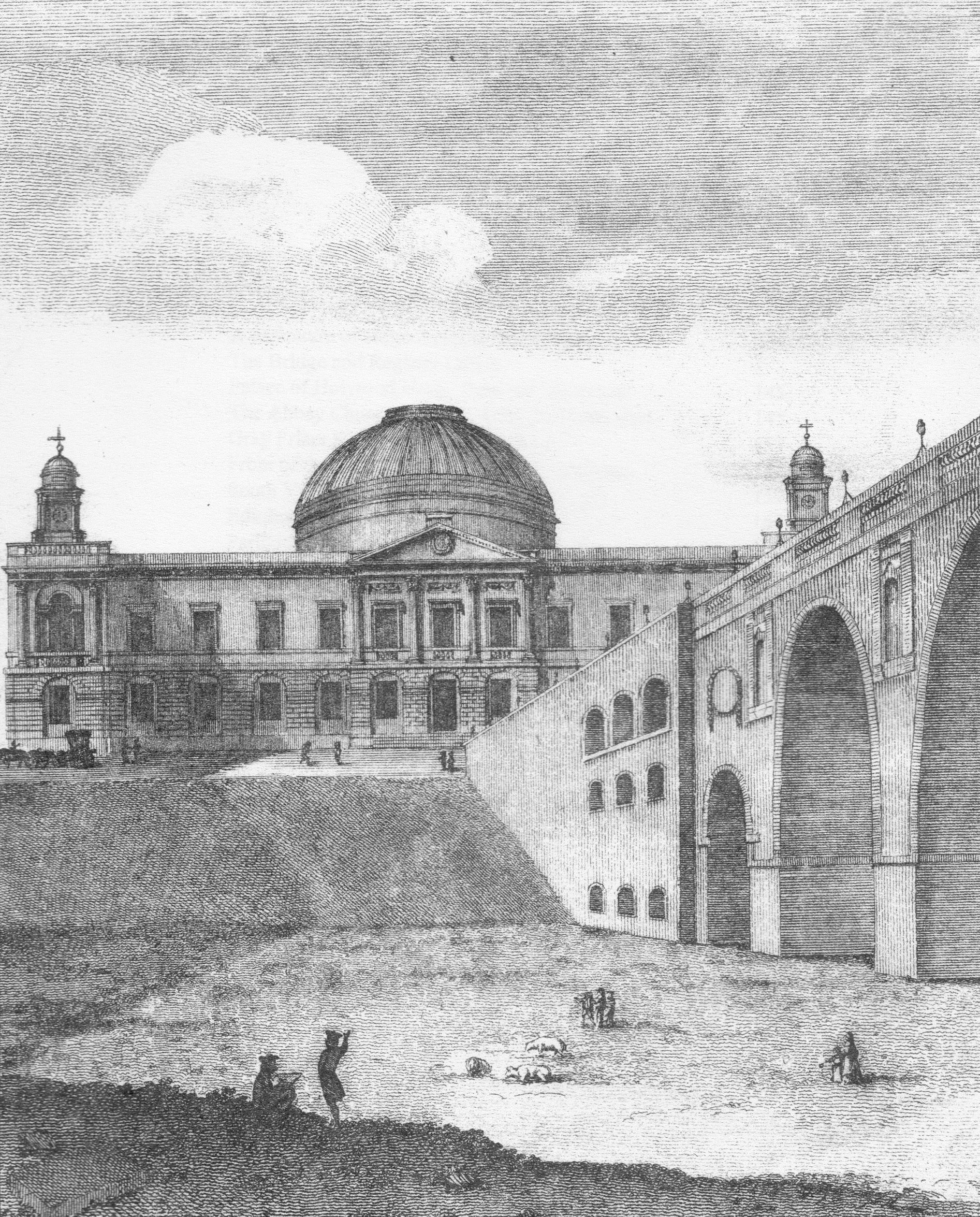
View of the North Bridge and Robert Adam's Register House, c.1800

A difficulty, however, occurred in the course of the work, which had neither been foreseen nor provided against. As the north side of the hill on which the old part of the city stands is extremely steep, it had been found convenient, in early times, to throw the earth dug from the foundations of houses down this declivity, towards the North Loch. As a result the whole mass, to a considerable depth, consisted entirely of loose earth. Mylne underestimated the depth of foundations required. This, together with other design faults, led to a collapse of part of the structure on 3 August 1769, killing five people. Rebuilding work cost another £18,000 and the bridge reopened in 1772.

The North Bridge consisted of three central arches, two side arches, with several smaller concealed ones at each end, of the following dimensions: width of the three central arches, 72 feet (22 m) each; breadth or thickness of the piers, 13.5 feet (4.1 m); width of the small arches, 20 feet (6.1 m) each. The total length of the piers and arches was 310 feet (94 m); and the whole length of the bridge, from the High Street to Princes Street was 1,125 feet (343 m). The height of the central arches, from the top of the parapet to the base, was 68 feet (21 m); the breadth of the bridge within the wall over the arches was 40 feet (12 m); and the breadth at each end 50 feet (15 m). In 1817, at the northern end, new buildings were begun on the site of St Anne Street, a steep street running alongside the bridge from Princes Street to Canal Street, which were to be built twelve feet from the bridge parapet with the space arched over and paved thus widening the bridge at this point by twelve feet.

== Current North Bridge ==
The current North Bridge is 525 feet (160 m) long and has three spans of arched girders each 175 feet (53 m) feet in length. It is 75 feet (23 m) wide. It was constructed from 1894 to 1897 by Sir William Arrol & Co., the company also noted for construction of the Forth Bridge. The design of the ornamentation was by the City architect of the time, Robert Morham.

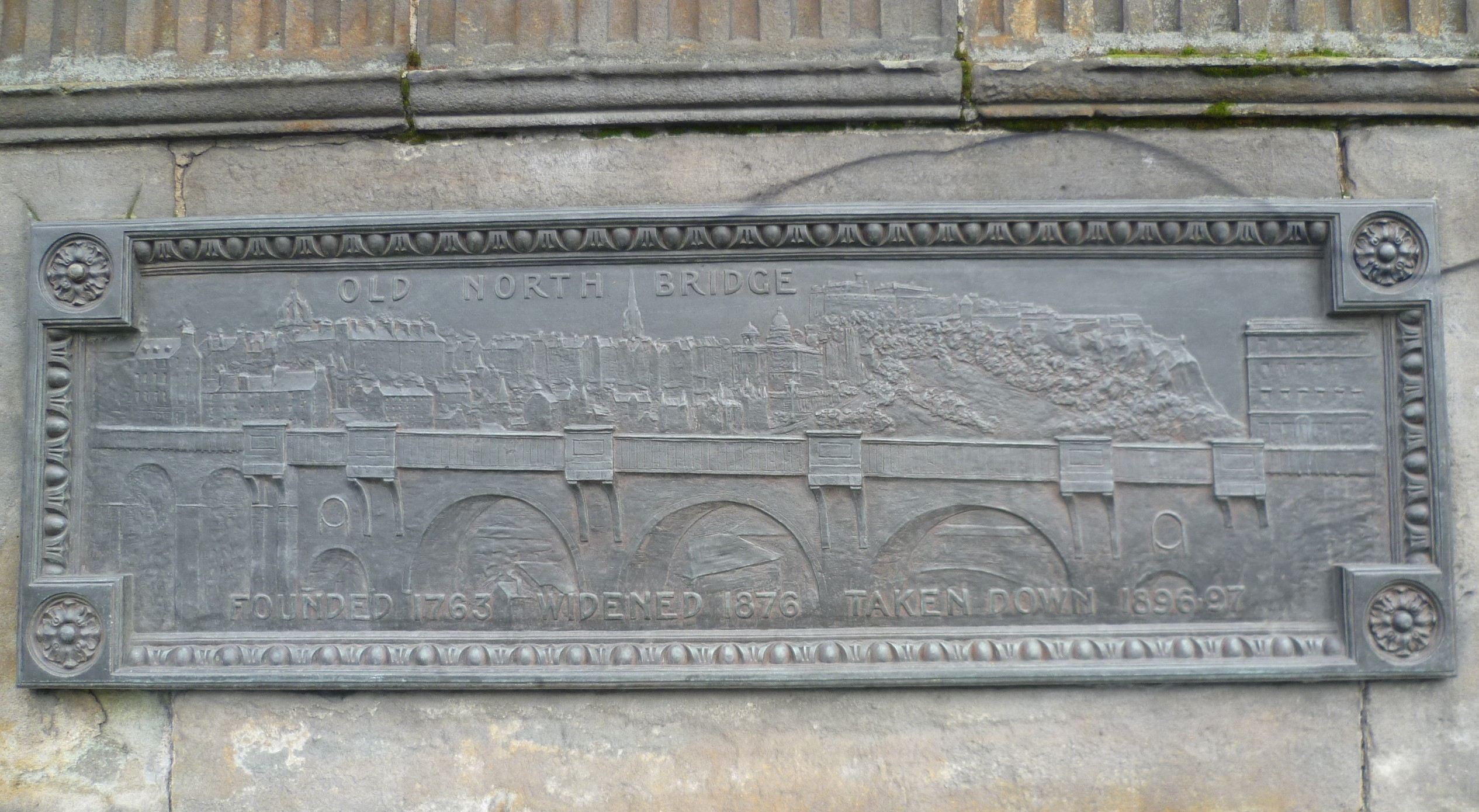
Old North Bridge plaque on the present bridge

The foundation stone was laid on 25 May 1896 by the Lord Provost, the Rt. Hon Andrew McDonald, with Masonic ceremonial. A medal was struck commemorating the opening of the bridge on 15 September 1897. The medal shows a view of the bridge with trains underneath and on the obverse a bust of the by then knighted Sir Andrew McDonald.

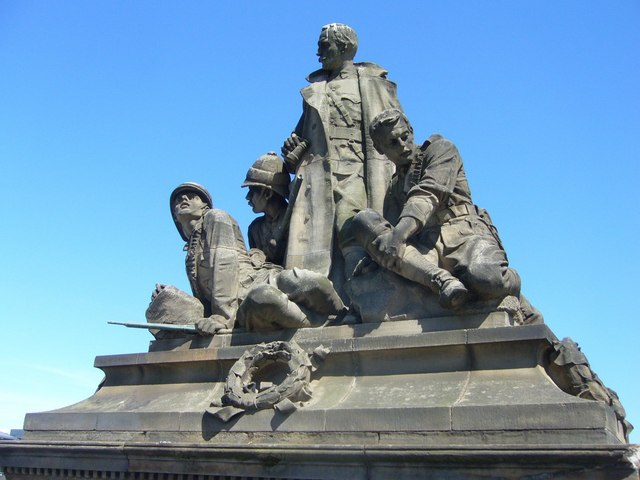
K.O.S.B. Memorial by Birnie Rhind, North Bridge

Situated on the bridge is a war memorial, by sculptor William Birnie Rhind which memorialises soldiers of the King's Own Scottish Borderers killed in campaigns between 1878 and 1902.

At the southern end of the bridge (where it meets the Royal Mile and South Bridge, in the Old Town) are substantial buildings whose main entrances are at carriageway level but which also have entrances in the valley below. Those on the west side are The Scotsman Hotel, former headquarters of The Scotsman newspaper, alongside a block of commercial premises and flats ("Royal Mile Mansions"). That on the east housed Patrick Thomson's department store from 1906 until 1976 when its then owner the House of Fraser rebranded it as Arnotts department store. The store closed in 1981 and the building was redeveloped as a hotel and smaller shops.

At the northern end of the bridge, where it meets Princes Street in the New Town, on the west side is the Balmoral Hotel, originally built as the North British Hotel, the North British Railway's hotel serving Waverley Station, which lies below. On the east side is Waverley Gate, originally the Edinburgh General Post Office, now serving as office space.

=== Refurbishment ===
In 2018, a major refurbishment project was started on the bridge. This involved relaying the paving slabs and kerbs, surfacing works, drainage upgrades and waterproofing, and repairs to the reinforced concrete bridge deck. To accommodate the work, from 13 November 2021 traffic was restricted to one southbound lane, along with the closure of the footpath on the west side, with northbound traffic being diverted via Chambers Street, George IV Bridge and The Mound. The work was originally planned to take nine months, but in July 2022 it was announced that the time-scale would be extended to Spring 2023. This was because of the poor condition of the concrete in the bridge's central bay, which would require its replacement along the entire length of the bay. The following month, a further delay was announced, with the work expected to be completed in 2024. In August 2022, the completion date was pushed back again to 2025. In May 2025, a new completion date of spring 2026 was announced, with the final cost now estimated to be "at least" £85 million. The road and footways across the bridge finally reopened on 31 July 2026, although construction work continued below the bridge deck.

== See also ==
- South Bridge, Edinburgh
- George IV Bridge
- List of bridges in Scotland
