= Argyle Street, Glasgow =

Thoroughfare in Glasgow

Coordinates: 55.85851°N 4.25789°W

Argyle Street
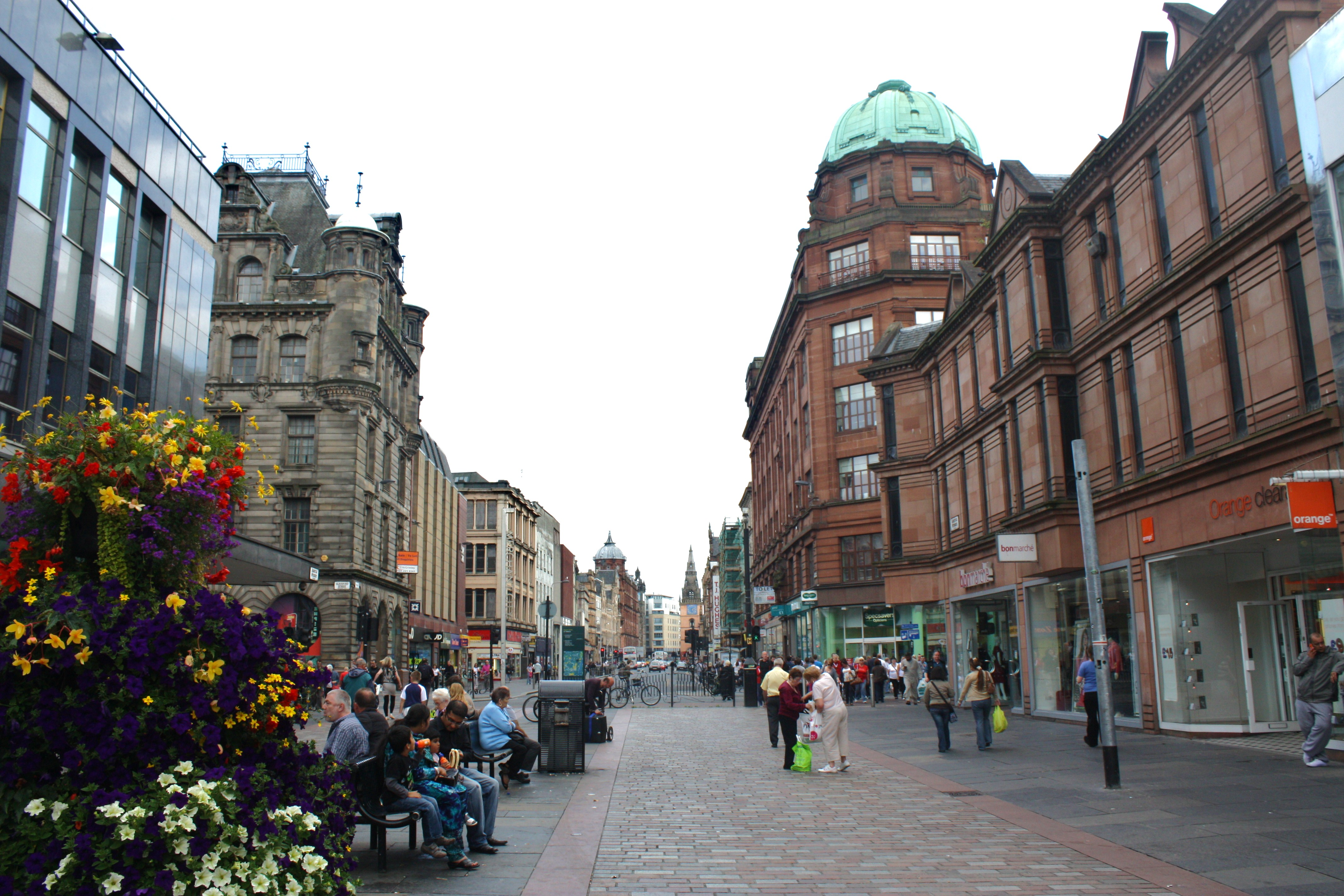
- Argyle Street looking eastwards towards Trongate
- Interactive map of Argyle Street
- Type: Commercial/Transport
- Maintained by: Glasgow City Council; Transport Scotland
- Length: 2.1 mi (3.4 km); 9.2º from east-west
- Location: Glasgow
- Postal code: G2; G3
- Nearest Glasgow Subway station: St Enoch Station

Other
- Known for: St Enoch Centre, Merchant City, Argyll Arcade

Argyle Street is a major thoroughfare in the city centre of Glasgow, Scotland.

With Buchanan Street and Sauchiehall Street, Argyle Street is one of the main shopping streets in the city centre. It is the longest street by distance in the city centre, running for 2.1 miles (3.4 km).

== Overview ==
It begins in the south-eastern corner of the city centre, at the Trongate, where it is pedestrianised as far as Queen Street. This section forms the major shopping section of the road, including the St. Enoch Centre and the Argyll Arcade (a Victorian arcade principally containing jewellers). Closed to most traffic, this section forms a taxi and bus corridor for services travelling to the east and south-east of the city.

After crossing the junction with Union Street / Jamaica Street, it passes underneath the expanse of railway lines at Glasgow Central Station (the so-called Hielanman's Umbrella) before becoming a major thoroughfare (A814) connecting the city centre to the M8 motorway and the Clydeside Expressway running alongside the River Clyde; however while traffic continues freely on the expressway, Argyle Street itself, which ran north-west through Anderston until the redevelopment of the area in the 1960s, now terminates as a through road after passing under the motorway at Anderston railway station, instead existing as an address in two unconnected sections.

The route then joins St. Vincent Street at Finnieston/Sandyford and is revived as a major thoroughfare as it heads out towards the West End of the city. It connects with Sauchiehall Street at Kelvingrove Art Gallery, and the road itself ends just beyond the Kelvin Hall on a bridge over the River Kelvin, where it becomes Dumbarton Road entering Partick.

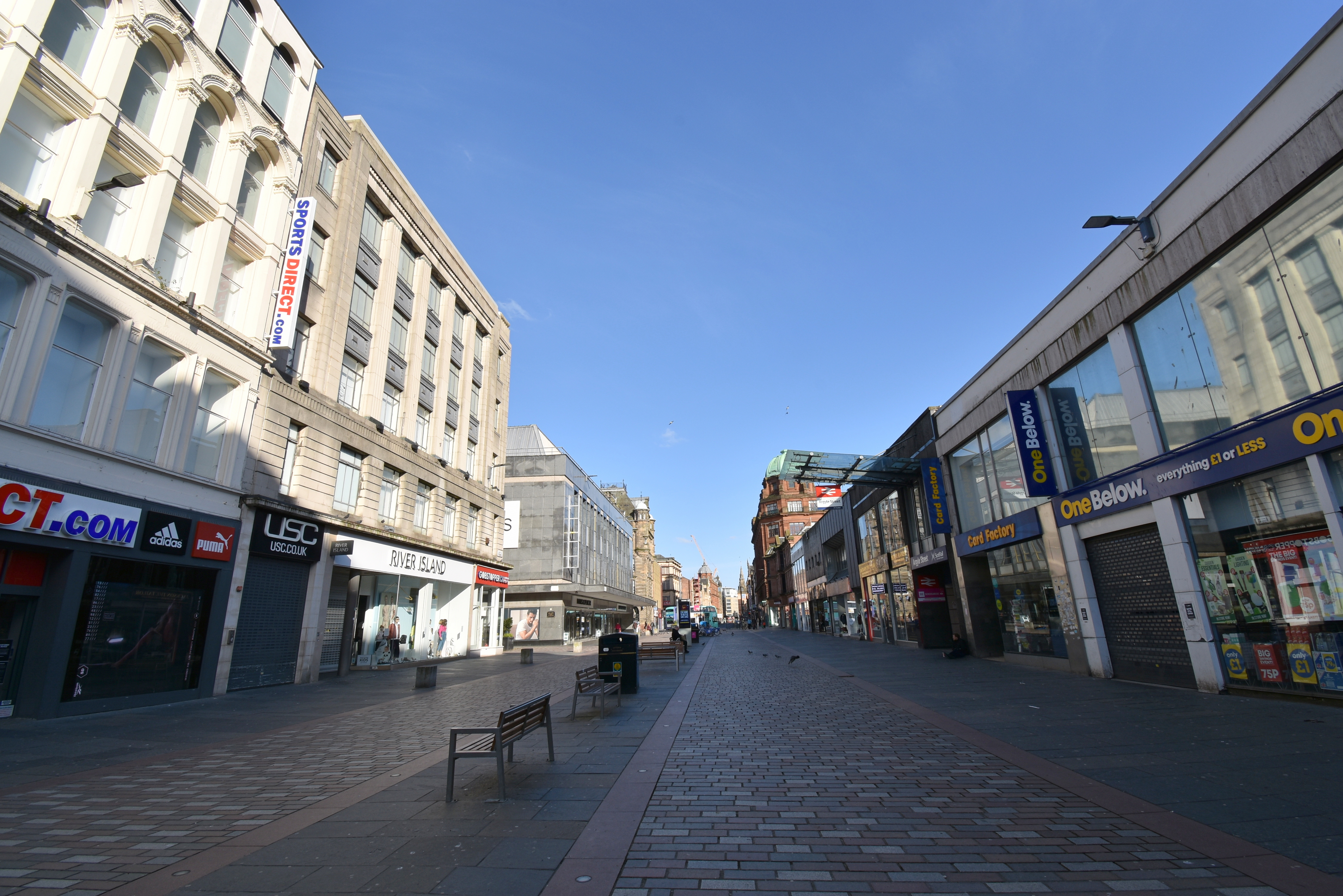
Argyle Street during coronavirus lockdown. 7 April 2020.

== History ==
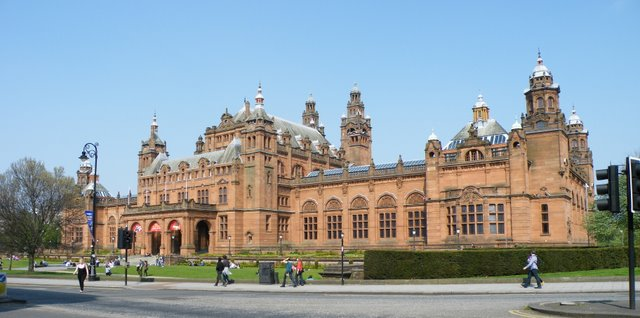
Kelvingrove Art Gallery as seen from Argyle Street in the West End of Glasgow.

Originally known as Westergait, Argyle Street led west from Trongate to the city's West Port, the western gate out of the city's walls. It was renamed in honour of the Duke of Argyll, some time after the removal of the West Port in 1751, as a result of the expansion of the city westward. The old West Port Well stood at the beginning of the street. On both sides of the street stood courts where businesses operated: Sysdney Court, Morrison's Court, Moodies's Court, Wellington Court, Wilson's Court, Buchanan Court, Turner's Court and Pratt's Court.

Major reconstruction of the area at the turn of the 1970s which saw the construction of the Glasgow Inner Ring Road, the demolition of Anderston Cross and its replacement with the Anderston Centre complex changed the line of Argyle Street, the eastern half now terminating underneath the Kingston Bridge approach viaduct whilst the main vehicle route over the motorway runs along St. Vincent Street, leaving a 250-metre stretch of the western half of road in Anderston isolated as a cul de sac.
