= Maryhill Central railway station =

Former railway station in Scotland

Maryhill Central
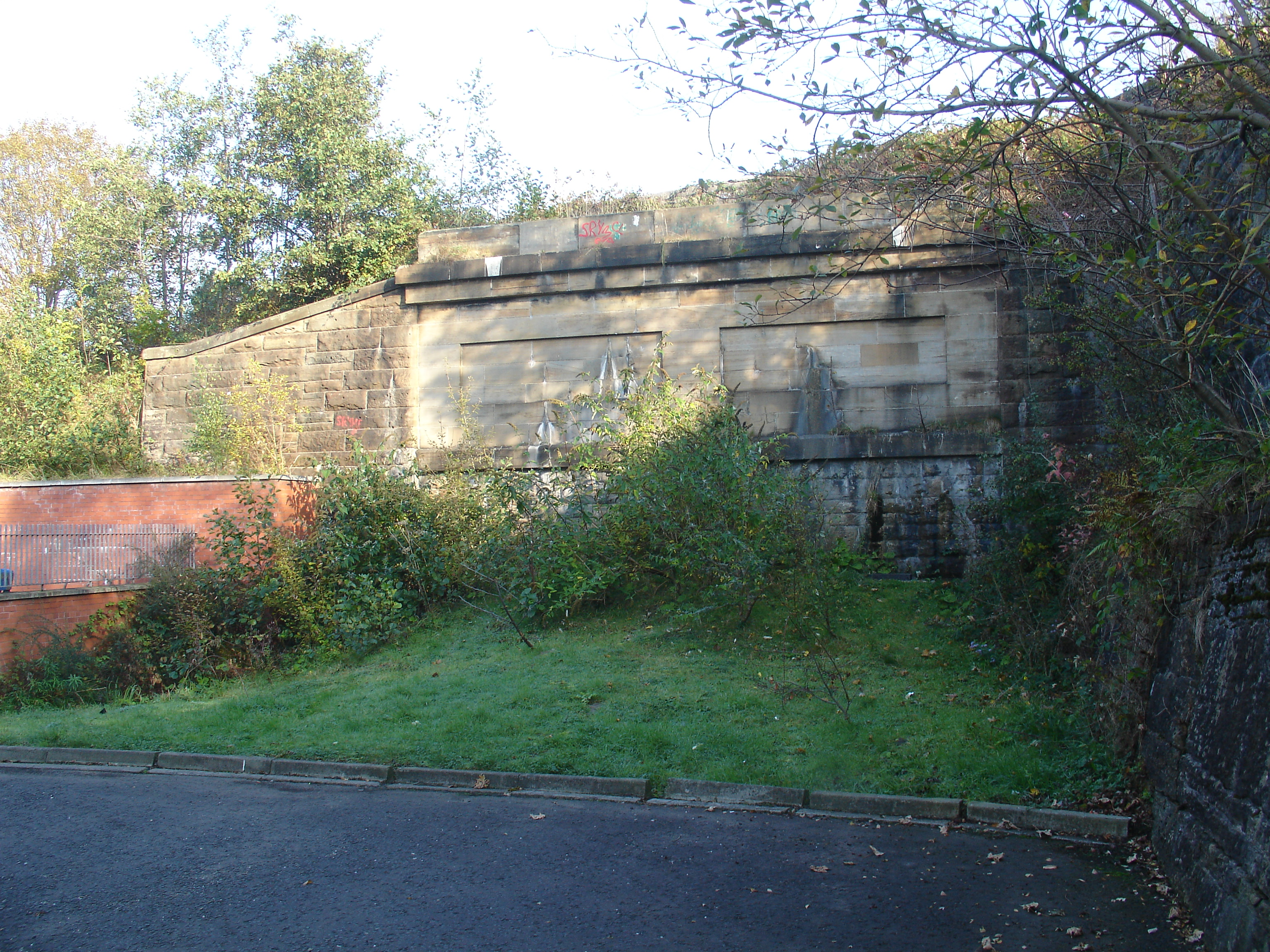
- This is all that is visible of the southern portal of the former Lanarkshire and Dunbartonshire Railway line heading north from Maryhill Central station. Hidden behind the Gala Bingo club, the tunnel entrance has been backfilled with earth, and the arch keystone is visible behind the shrubbery. Crossing above is the Glasgow Branch of the Forth & Clyde Canal.

General information
- Location: Maryhill, Glasgow; Scotland
- Coordinates: 55.88752°N 4.28782°W
- Grid reference: NS570683
- Platforms: 4

Other information
- Status: Disused

History
- Original company: Glasgow Central Railway; Lanarkshire and Dunbartonshire Railway
- Pre-grouping: Caledonian Railway
- Post-grouping: LMS

Key dates
- 26 November 1894: Opened as Maryhill Barracks
- 1 October 1895: Renamed as Maryhill
- 15 September 1952: Renamed as Maryhill Central
- 2 November 1959: GCR services ceased
- 5 October 1964: Closed to passengers
Location

Maryhill Central was a railway station to the north west of Glasgow.

== Location ==
To the west of the station was a triangular set of junctions. Immediately to the west was Maryhill Central junction where the line to Kirklee diverged to the south and the Lanarkshire and Dunbartonshire Railway headed east to Bellshaugh Junction where the western side of the triangle (from Kirklee Junction at the southern point of the junctions) and the Lanarkshire and Dunbartonshire Railway met before the line to Dawsholm diverged to the north. There was another Maryhill station to the north.

== Closure ==
It was closed to passengers on 2 November 1959 on the Glasgow Central Railway route and on 5 October 1964 on the Lanarkshire and Dunbartonshire Railway between Possil and Partick, with the lines in the area being closed on 5 October 1964.

== Current site usage ==
The site of the station is now occupied by Maryhill Shopping Centre which was built in the early 1980s. This was rebuilt in around 2010 to consist of a supermarket, with 4 retail units and car parking below. However, a space was left in the basement of the shopping centre to allow the line to be re-opened in the future; this was still considered an option in the mid-1990s, with the building of a large bingo hall on the cutting (east of the site) left a channel for the original line to be re-opened below ground.

In 1999, however, this prospect was put to rest with the sale of land for housing along many parts of the track in the Kirklee and Cleveden sections of the track along with the demolition of many of the bridges around the same area for safety reasons. Maryhill Shopping Centre was demolished in early 2010 and replaced by a new Tesco supermarket. The void beneath the supermarket for the railway station has again been retained to allow the future possibility of reopening the railway line.

== Railway routes ==
Preceding station	Historical railways	Following station
Kirklee; Line and station closed	Caledonian Railway; Glasgow Central Railway	Terminus
Dawsholm; Line and station closed	Caledonian Railway; Glasgow Central Railway	Terminus
Kelvinside; Line and station closed	Caledonian Railway; Lanarkshire and Dunbartonshire Railway	Possil; Line and station closed

== 1900s map of Maryhill ==
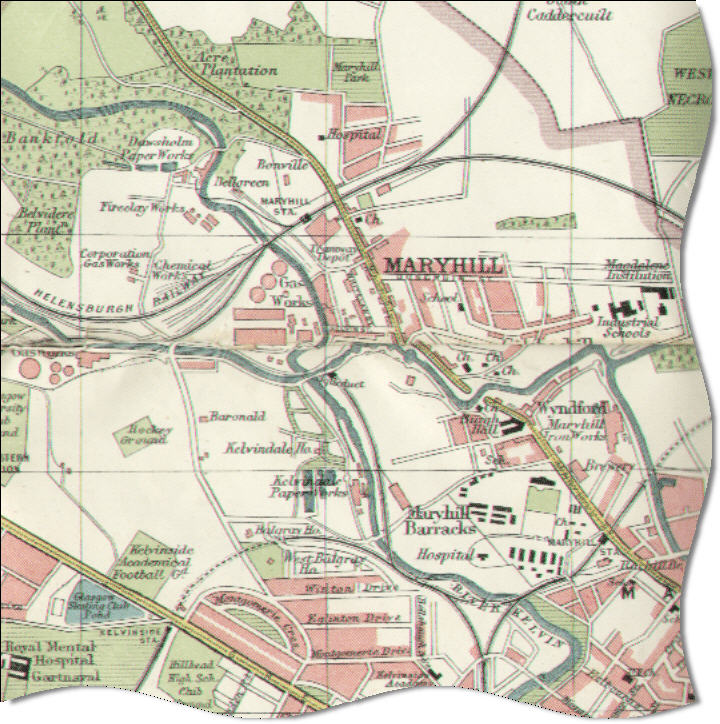
Map of railways in the locality in the early 1900s. Both Maryhill stations are shown, Maryhill Central (also confusingly called 'Maryhill') is adjacent to the barracks
