= Kelvinbridge (disambiguation) =

Kelvinbridge may refer to:

- Kelvinbridge, the common name for the Great Western Bridge in the West End of Glasgow, Scotland
  - Kelvinbridge railway station, a former railway station named after the bridge
  - Kelvinbridge subway station, a station on the Glasgow Subway named after the bridge
- Kelvin bridge, a measuring instrument
