= Anderston railway station =

Railway station in Glasgow, Scotland

Anderston Scottish Gaelic: Baile Aindrea
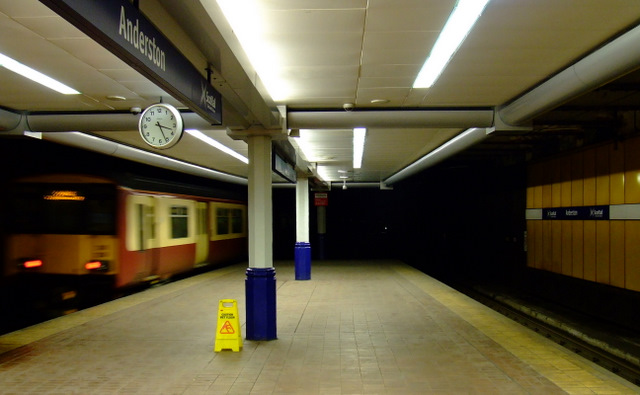
- Platforms at Anderston

General information
- Location: Anderston, Glasgow; Scotland
- Coordinates: 55.8598°N 4.2703°W
- Grid reference: NS579653
- Owner: Network Rail
- Manager: ScotRail
- Transit authority: SPT
- Platforms: 2

Other information
- Station code: AND
- Fare zone: 1

History
- Original company: Glasgow Central Railway
- Pre-grouping: Caledonian Railway
- Post-grouping: LMS

Key dates
- 10 August 1896: Opened as Anderston Cross
- 3 August 1959: Station closed
- 1968: Station building demolished
- 5 November 1979: Reopened as Anderston

Passengers
- 2021/22: ▲0.218 million
- 2022/23: ▲0.229 million
- 2023/24: ▲0.369 million
- 2024/25: ▲0.419 million
- 2025/26: ▲0.443 million
Location
Notes
- Passenger statistics from the Office of Rail and Road

Anderston railway station serves Glasgow's financial district of Anderston and, across the M8 motorway, the housing schemes of both Anderston West and the Blythswood Court estate of the Anderston Centre. It is also close to both the Hilton and Marriott hotels. It is a staffed station with an island platform and most of it is underground.

== History ==
The station was opened on 10 August 1896 by the Glasgow Central Railway which was subsequently absorbed by the Caledonian Railway. It later became part of the London, Midland and Scottish Railway during the Grouping of 1923. The station then passed on to the Scottish Region of British Railways on nationalisation in 1948. It was then closed by the British Transport Commission on 3 August 1959.

The original building was demolished in 1968 as, like many other ornate and historical buildings in the area, it lay in the path of the M8 motorway. The station was reopened as part of the Argyle Line project on 5 November 1979 by the British Railways Board and Strathclyde PTE and retains some of the original architecture at platform level.

When sectorisation was introduced in the 1980s, the station was served by ScotRail under arrangement with the PTE until the privatisation of British Rail in the 1990s.

Ticket barriers came into operation on 22 June 2011.

In 2022, the station was extensively refurbished with new finishes on the concourse and platforms, a remodelled booking office and a new lift.

== Gallery ==
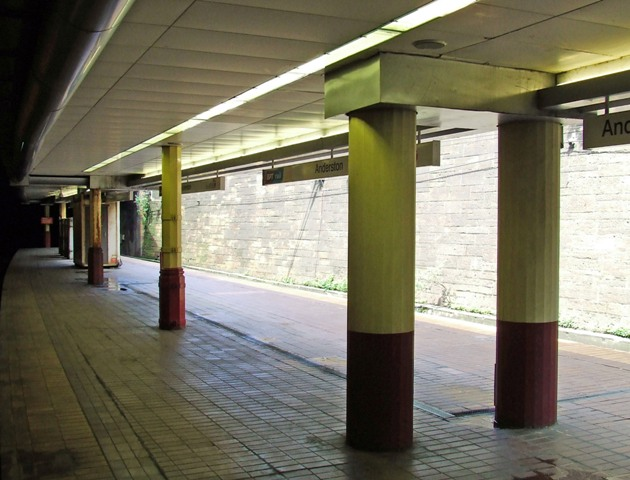
Anderston station platform

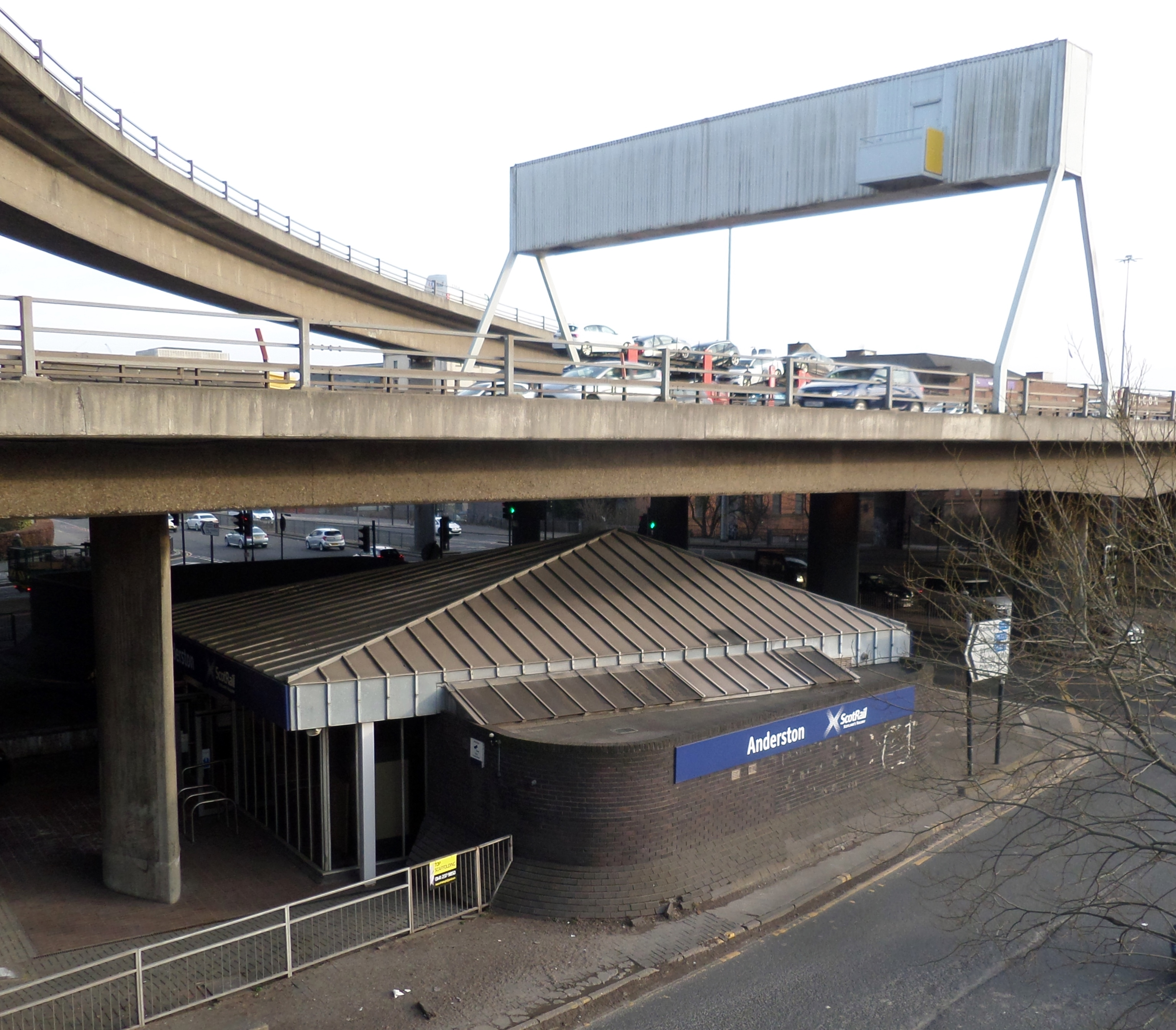
The station building, with the Kingston Bridge overhead

== Services ==
Mondays to Saturdays:

- 2tph to Dalmuir via Yoker
- 2tph to Dalmuir via Singer
- 2tph to Milngavie via Westerton
- 2tph to Whifflet, with an hourly extension to Motherwell
- 2tph to Larkhall via Hamilton
- 1tph to Motherwell via Hamilton
- 1tph to Cumbernauld via Hamilton and Motherwell

Sundays (10.00 - 18:00 only)

- 2tph to Balloch via Yoker
- 2tph to Milngavie
- 1tph to Larkhall
- 1tph to Motherwell via Whifflet
- 2tph to Motherwell via Hamilton

Some weekday peak services to/from the south also start or terminate here.

Preceding station	National Rail	Following station
Glasgow Central (Low Level)	ScotRail; Argyle Line	Exhibition Centre
	Historical railways	
Glasgow Central (Low Level); Line open; station open	Caledonian Railway; Glasgow Central Railway	Stobcross; Line open; station open
