= OVO Hydro =

Multi-purpose indoor arena in Glasgow, Scotland

The OVO Hydro
- The Hydro

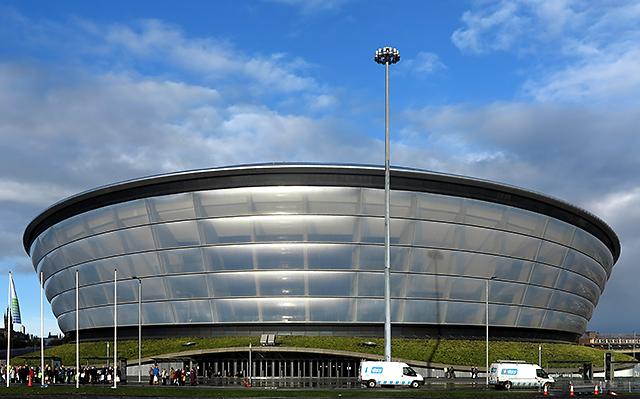
- The OVO Hydro, then known as the SSE Hydro, in 2017
- Interactive map of The OVO Hydro
- Former names: The SSE Hydro (2013–2021)
- Address: Exhibition Way, Stobcross Road, Glasgow, Scotland
- Coordinates: 55.8603°N 4.2849°W
- Owner: Scottish Event Campus Limited
- Capacity: 12,306 (fully seated); 14,700 (seated and standing)
- Public transit: Exhibition Centre railway station

Construction
- Groundbreaking: February 2011
- Built: 2011–2013
- Opened: 30 September 2013
- Cost: £125 million
- Architect: Foster + Partners
- Project manager: Turner & Townsend
- Structural engineer: Arup
- General contractor: Lendlease

Website
- www.ovohydro.com

The OVO Hydro is a multi-purpose indoor arena located within the Scottish Event Campus (SEC) in Glasgow, Scotland. Designed by the architectural practice Foster + Partners, the arena opened on 30 September 2013 and hosts concerts, sporting competitions, comedy performances, award ceremonies and other large-scale entertainment events.

With a maximum capacity of approximately 14,700, the arena forms part of a wider events complex alongside the SEC Centre and the SEC Armadillo. It attracts more than one million visitors annually and has regularly featured among the world's busiest indoor arenas in rankings published by the live entertainment industry magazine Pollstar.

The venue was initially named the Scottish Hydro Arena, after its sponsor Scottish Hydro Electric. It opened as the SSE Hydro following the rebranding of its sponsor as SSE and was renamed the OVO Hydro in October 2021, following a sponsorship agreement with OVO Energy.

== History ==
=== Development and planning ===
Plans for a large indoor arena at the former Queen's Dock formed part of the wider redevelopment of Glasgow's waterfront and the Scottish Exhibition and Conference Centre (SECC), now known as the Scottish Event Campus. The development was intended to complement the existing exhibition facilities and provide Glasgow with a larger venue for concerts, sporting competitions and international entertainment productions. An arena proposal was reported in May 2003, with an anticipated capacity of approximately 12,300 seated spectators and additional standing accommodation.

The London-based architectural practice Foster + Partners was appointed to design the arena in May 2004. The practice had also designed the SEC Armadillo, which opened in 1997, making the arena part of a continuing architectural development of the waterfront campus. The arena's design was unveiled publicly in October 2005, with the project receiving planning approval in July 2006, establishing the basis for the construction of a large-scale indoor entertainment venue on the riverside site. The arena was conceived as a complementary facility to the exhibition halls and the SEC Armadillo. Its development increased the campus's capacity to accommodate events requiring a large audience and helped establish the complex as a combined exhibition, conference and entertainment destination.

=== Construction ===
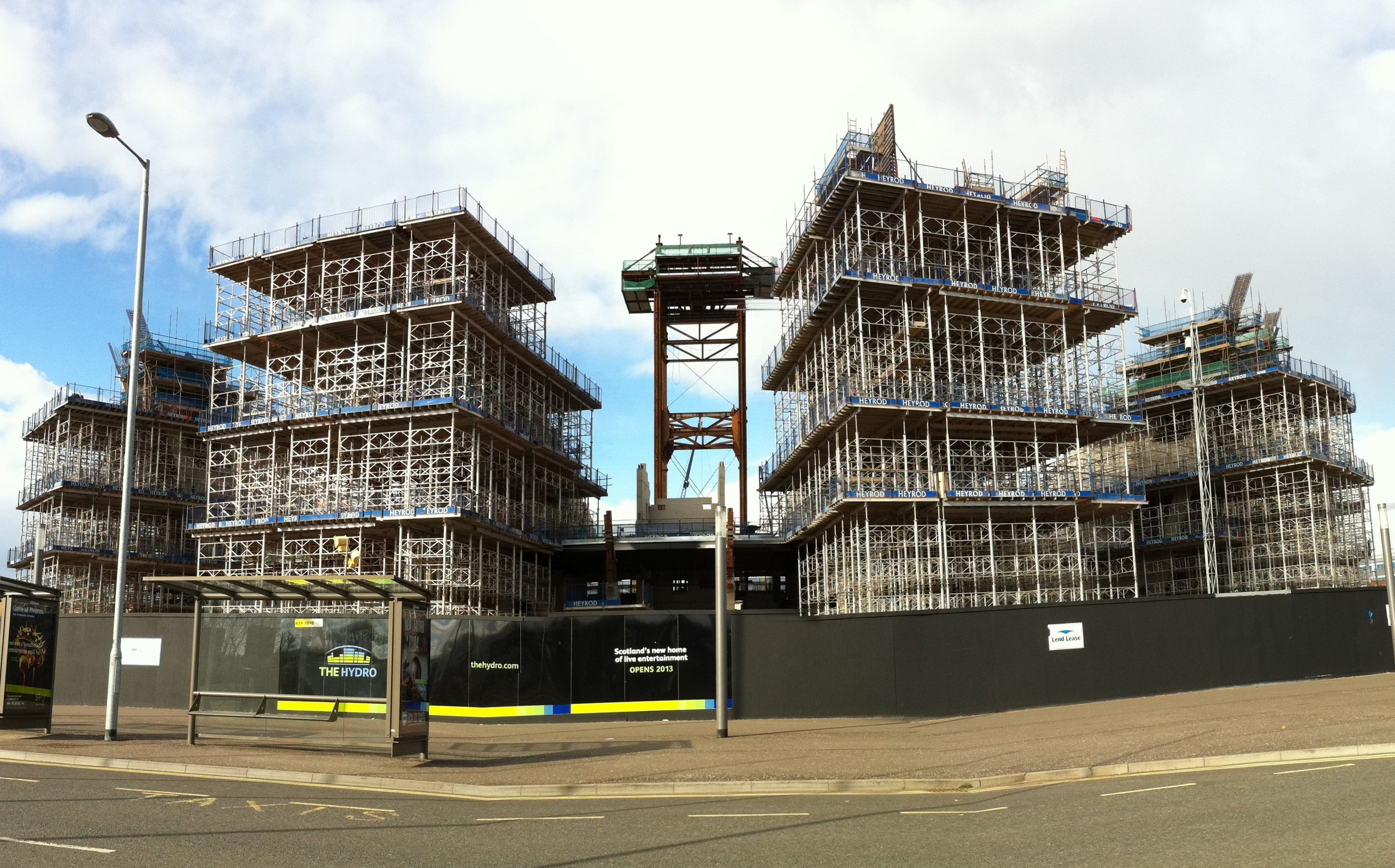
The Hydro under construction, April 2012

Construction began in February 2011, with Lendlease appointed as the main contractor. Arup acted as structural engineer, while Turner & Townsend undertook project management. The project was reported to have cost approximately £125 million. Construction included the development of the arena's roof structure, its external enclosure and the installation of seating and event infrastructure. Work on the roof began in November 2011 and was completed in April 2013. Translucent external cushions were installed during the final stages of construction, alongside the arena's internal seating. The building was substantially completed in 2013, ahead of its opening in September that year.

==== 2013 roof fire ====
On 8 June 2013, a fire broke out on the roof of the partially completed arena. The incident was reported at approximately 15:20, and firefighters from the Scottish Fire and Rescue Service attended the scene. Contemporary reports attributed the fire to sparks from welding work being carried out on the roof. The incident raised concerns about the remaining construction programme, but the venue's operator subsequently stated that the project remained on schedule for completion.

=== Opening and naming ===
The arena officially opened on 30 September 2013 with a concert by Scottish singer Rod Stewart. The opening marked the completion of a major addition to Glasgow's conference and entertainment facilities. During the planning and construction phases, the building was known as Scotland's National Arena and subsequently the Scottish Hydro Arena. It opened under the name SSE Hydro following the rebranding of Scottish Hydro Electric as SSE.

In October 2021, the venue announced that it would be renamed the OVO Hydro after OVO Energy became its title sponsor. The change was accompanied by a stated intention to place greater emphasis on sustainability and reducing the environmental impact of live entertainment.

== Architecture and design ==
=== Exterior ===
The OVO Hydro illuminated at night, September 2026

Interior arena view

The OVO Hydro was designed by Foster + Partners, an architectural practice based in London. Its distinctive form and illuminated exterior have made it a recognisable feature of Glasgow's waterfront. The building's roof and external envelope incorporate translucent cushions that form a lightweight enclosure around the arena. The external material allows the structure to be illuminated at night, creating a prominent visual presence within the Scottish Event Campus. The design combines a large, enclosed performance space with an exterior intended to give the arena an identifiable appearance from the surrounding waterfront and city. Its scale reflects the requirements of a venue capable of accommodating major concerts, international sporting events and large audience productions.

The building is approximately 45 metres high and occupies a prominent position beside the River Clyde. Its circular arena form has been described in architectural coverage as drawing on the spatial arrangement of classical amphitheatres.

=== Interior and capacity ===
The interior is designed to accommodate different types of event, with seating arrangements and the arena floor capable of being reconfigured according to production requirements. The venue has a fully seated capacity of 12,306 and a maximum capacity of 14,300 when seated and standing arrangements are combined. Its flexible layout also permits the arena to be divided into smaller configurations for selected productions and events.

Technical facilities include a large arena floor, a roof-mounted rigging system for production equipment, digital signage and facilities for performers and touring crews. These provisions support the installation of concert stages, lighting systems, sound equipment and other temporary production infrastructure. The venue's flexible arrangement allows it to host events with substantially different staging requirements, ranging from concerts and combat sports to televised award ceremonies and family entertainment productions.

== Location and transport ==
The OVO Hydro is situated on Exhibition Way, close to Stobcross Road, on the north bank of the River Clyde in Glasgow. It forms part of the Scottish Event Campus, which also includes the SEC Centre and the SEC Armadillo. The campus is served by Exhibition Centre railway station, providing a rail connection to Glasgow's wider transport network. The location also places the arena within the wider Clyde waterfront regeneration area, which has developed as a destination for conferences, exhibitions, tourism and entertainment. The presence of several large event venues on the same campus allows exhibitions, conferences and entertainment productions to take place across different buildings within the wider complex.

== Events ==
Ariana Grande performing during row 2014 MTV Europe Music Awards held at The Hydro

The OVO Hydro hosts national and international musical performers, sporting competitions, comedy shows, family entertainment, televised award ceremonies and political events. The venue's size and adaptable layout have enabled it to accommodate both touring productions and events of national significance.

=== Music and entertainment ===
Music has been central to the arena's programme since its opening. Rod Stewart performed the venue's inaugural concert on 30 September 2013, establishing the arena as a major addition to Scotland's live music infrastructure. The venue subsequently hosted performances by artists from a wide range of musical genres, alongside comedy tours, family shows and large-scale entertainment productions. Its capacity and technical infrastructure allow international touring artists to stage productions designed for major indoor arenas. The arena has also hosted prominent entertainment events, including the MTV Europe Music Awards, and has been used for productions requiring substantial staging and audience capacity.

=== Sport ===
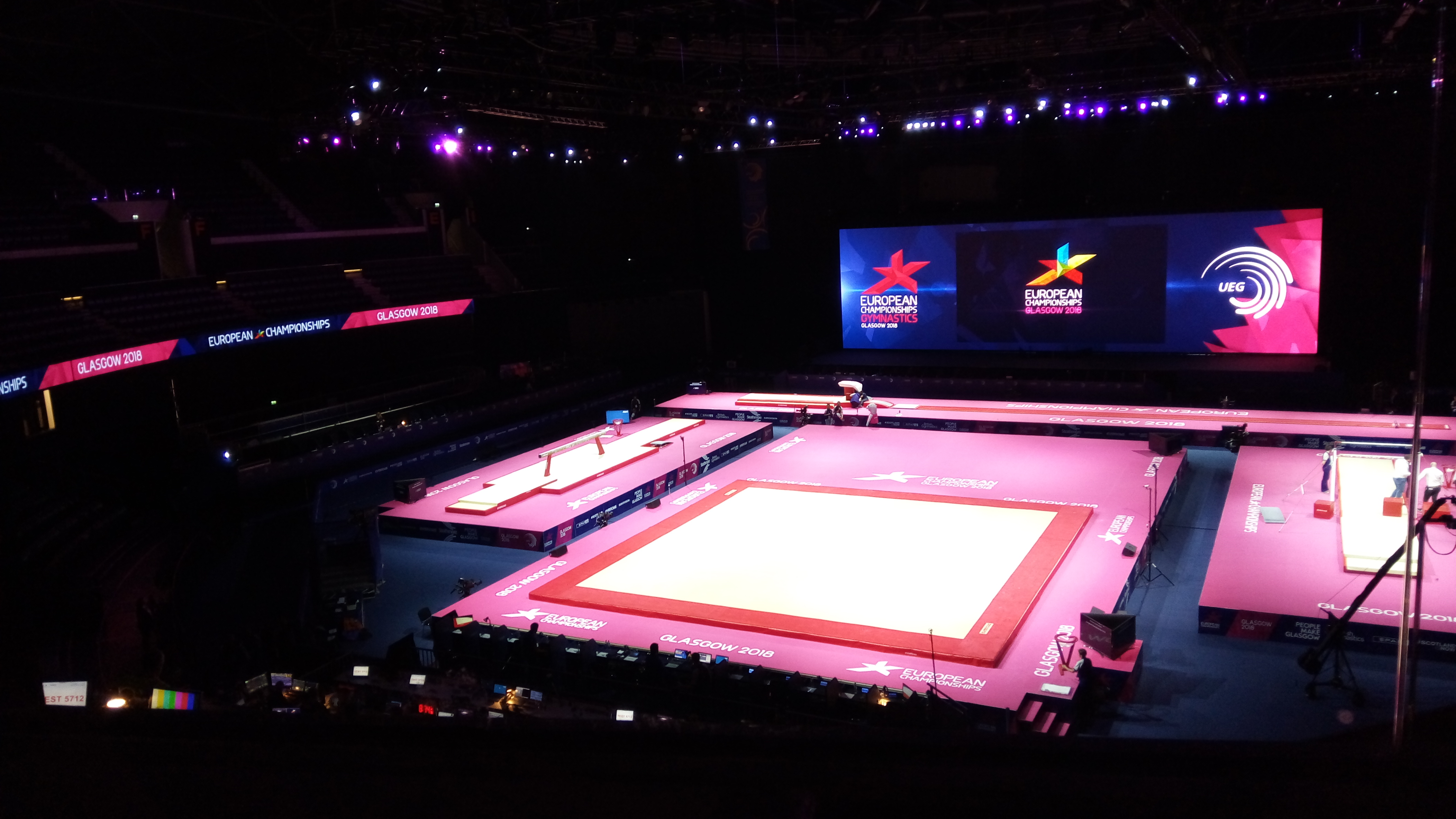
The interior of the OVO Hydro during the 2018 European Artistic Gymnastics Championships

==== Commonwealth Games ====
The OVO Hydro was a venue for the 2014 Commonwealth Games, which were held in Glasgow from 23 July to 3 August 2014. It hosted netball and gymnastics competitions, including the netball final.

The use of the arena for the Games demonstrated its suitability for international multi-sport competitions and provided a major sporting event early in its operational history. The venue was also used for the 2026 Commonwealth Games, hosting netball and the opening and closing ceremonies. The ceremonies marked the first time in the history of the Commonwealth Games that both were held inside an indoor arena.

==== Gymnastics ====
In October and November 2015, the arena hosted the 2015 World Artistic Gymnastics Championships. The competition brought together international gymnasts for a major championship in the sport and further established the venue as a location for indoor sporting events.

==== Boxing and mixed martial arts ====
The arena has hosted professional boxing and mixed martial arts events. On 18 July 2015, the Ultimate Fighting Championship held UFC Fight Night: Bisping vs. Leites, its first event in Scotland. In 2016, the venue hosted a heavyweight boxing contest between Dillian Whyte and Ian Lewison. It subsequently staged several bouts headlined by Scottish boxer Josh Taylor and hosted two rounds of the 2018–19 World Boxing Super Series.

==== Other sporting events ====
On 14 December 2014, the arena hosted the BBC Sports Personality of the Year Award ceremony. The event brought together leading figures in British sport for a nationally televised awards programme.

=== Professional wrestling ===
The OVO Hydro has hosted major professional wrestling events organised by British and international promotions. On 20 November 2016, Scottish promotion Insane Championship Wrestling staged its Fear & Loathing IX event at the arena. The show attracted 6,193 spectators and was regarded as a significant milestone for the independent British wrestling scene. Insane Championship Wrestling returned the following year for Fear & Loathing X, continuing the promotion's use of the arena for its annual major event.

On 14 June 2024, WWE broadcast an episode of SmackDown from the arena. The following evening, it hosted Clash at the Castle: Scotland, a major WWE premium live event. The shows marked WWE's return to Scotland for televised programming and its first major televised premium live event in the country. In April 2025, All Elite Wrestling announced that it would make its Scottish debut with recordings of AEW Dynamite and AEW Collision at the arena on 20 August 2025.

=== Politics ===
On 11 September 2014, the arena hosted Scotland Decides: The Big, Big Debate, a televised political debate organised by BBC Scotland and Mentorn during the campaign for the 2014 Scottish independence referendum. The event involved approximately 7,500 young people and first-time voters, with secondary schools across Scotland invited to participate. It was presented by James Cook and broadcast on BBC One Scotland. The debate formed part of the wider public discussion surrounding the referendum, which took place on 18 September 2014.

=== International conferences and COP26 ===
The OVO Hydro forms part of the Scottish Event Campus, which hosted the 2021 United Nations Climate Change Conference (COP26) in Glasgow from 31 October to 12 November 2021. The conference brought together government delegations, international organisations and other participants to discuss responses to climate change.

=== Filming location ===
The exterior of the OVO Hydro has been used as a filming location for screen productions. The arena appeared in exterior shots representing the fictional venue for the 2020 Eurovision Song Contest in the film Eurovision Song Contest: The Story of Fire Saga. The building was also used to represent the exterior of the fictional Los Angeles Waves basketball arena in the Netflix television series Running Point, despite the series being set in the United States.

== Sustainability ==
Following its renaming in 2021, the OVO Hydro placed increased emphasis on reducing the environmental impact of its operations. Its sustainability strategy includes work on energy consumption, waste management, water efficiency, transport and engagement with event organisers and visitors. In May 2022, the arena became the first venue to receive A Greener Arena certification from A Greener Festival, an organisation that assesses the environmental and social impacts of events and venues. Measures highlighted in connection with the certification included the use of renewable electricity, the elimination of single-use plastic cups at live events, food sourcing and waste reduction initiatives.

In October 2024, the venue announced that it had received Commended status under its Greener Arena accreditation. The assessment considered areas including transport, energy, waste, water, food and beverages, carbon emissions and the local environment.

== Ticket sales and international rankings ==
The OVO Hydro has regularly featured in international rankings of arenas based on ticket sales. These rankings provide an indication of the scale of its live entertainment programme and its position within the international touring market. In 2016, the arena sold 751,487 tickets, placing it eighth in Pollstar's worldwide ranking of arena venues by ticket sales for that year. In December 2019, GlasgowLive reported that the arena had been ranked the world's second-busiest arena venue, behind Madison Square Garden in New York City.

In 2023, the arena recorded 1,012,333 ticket sales in Pollstar's published ranking of the world's busiest arenas, placing eighth in the table.

World's Busiest Arenas – 2023
| Venue | Ticket sales |
|---|---|
| Madison Square Garden, New York City, US | 1,985,832 |
| Movistar Arena, Santiago, Chile | 1,451,098 |
| The O2 Arena, London, England | 1,264,882 |
| WiZink Center, Madrid, Spain | 1,191,860 |
| Accor Arena, Paris, France | 1,134,237 |
| Kia Forum, Inglewood, US | 1,100,855 |
| Dickies Arena, Fort Worth, US | 1,015,253 |
| OVO Hydro, Glasgow, Scotland | 1,012,333 |
| Lanxess Arena, Cologne, Germany | 1,004,777 |
| 3Arena, Dublin, Ireland | 975,640 |

== See also ==
- SEC Centre
- SEC Armadillo
- Scottish Event Campus
- List of indoor arenas in the United Kingdom
