= Kirklee railway station =

Railway station in Glasgow City, Scotland

Coordinates: 55.8820°N 4.2926°W

Kirklee
- Kirklee station platforms in October 2007

General information
- Location: Kelvinside, Glasgow; Scotland
- Grid reference: NS567678
- Platforms: 2

Other information
- Status: Disused

History
- Original company: Glasgow Central Railway
- Pre-grouping: Caledonian Railway
- Post-grouping: LMS

Key dates
- 10 August 1896: Opened
- 1 January 1917: Closed
- 1919: Reopened
- 1 May 1939: Closed to passengers
- 5 October 1964: Line closed
- 1971: Station buildings demolished
Location

Kirklee railway station was a railway station serving the Kelvinside area in the West End of Glasgow, Scotland.

== History ==
The station was opened on 10 August 1896 by the Glasgow Central Railway. Also known as Kirklee for North Kelvinside, it was closed between 1 January 1917 and 2 March 1919 2 June 1919 and closed permanently to passengers on 1 May 1939, with the line being closed on 5 October 1964.

The station building was designed by famous architect Sir J.J. Burnet who earned his knighthood on the basis of his design for the extension of the British Museum. The construction of the station was controversial in the 1890s as it destroyed a local beauty spot known as the Peartree Well. Little is known of the station's use after closure but a photo taken in 1959 appears to show it in use a private house. The station buildings were demolished in 1971 having fallen into disrepair.

The bulk of the station site is now occupied by blocks of apartments, however the platforms partially remain in place to the south, beyond the supports for a bridge which has since been removed, and just before a long tunnel leading to Botanic Gardens railway station. A telegraph pole dating from the line's operation is still present just before the mouth of the tunnel.

The station has been fenced in on both sides in 2017.

== Footnotes ==
Preceding station	Historical railways	Following station
Botanic Gardens; Line and station closed	Caledonian Railway; Glasgow Central Railway	Dawsholm; Line and station closed
Botanic Gardens; Line and station closed	Caledonian Railway; Glasgow Central Railway	Maryhill Central; Line and station closed
