= Exhibition Centre railway station =

Railway station in Glasgow, Scotland

Exhibition Centre Scottish Gaelic: Ionad Taisbeanaidh
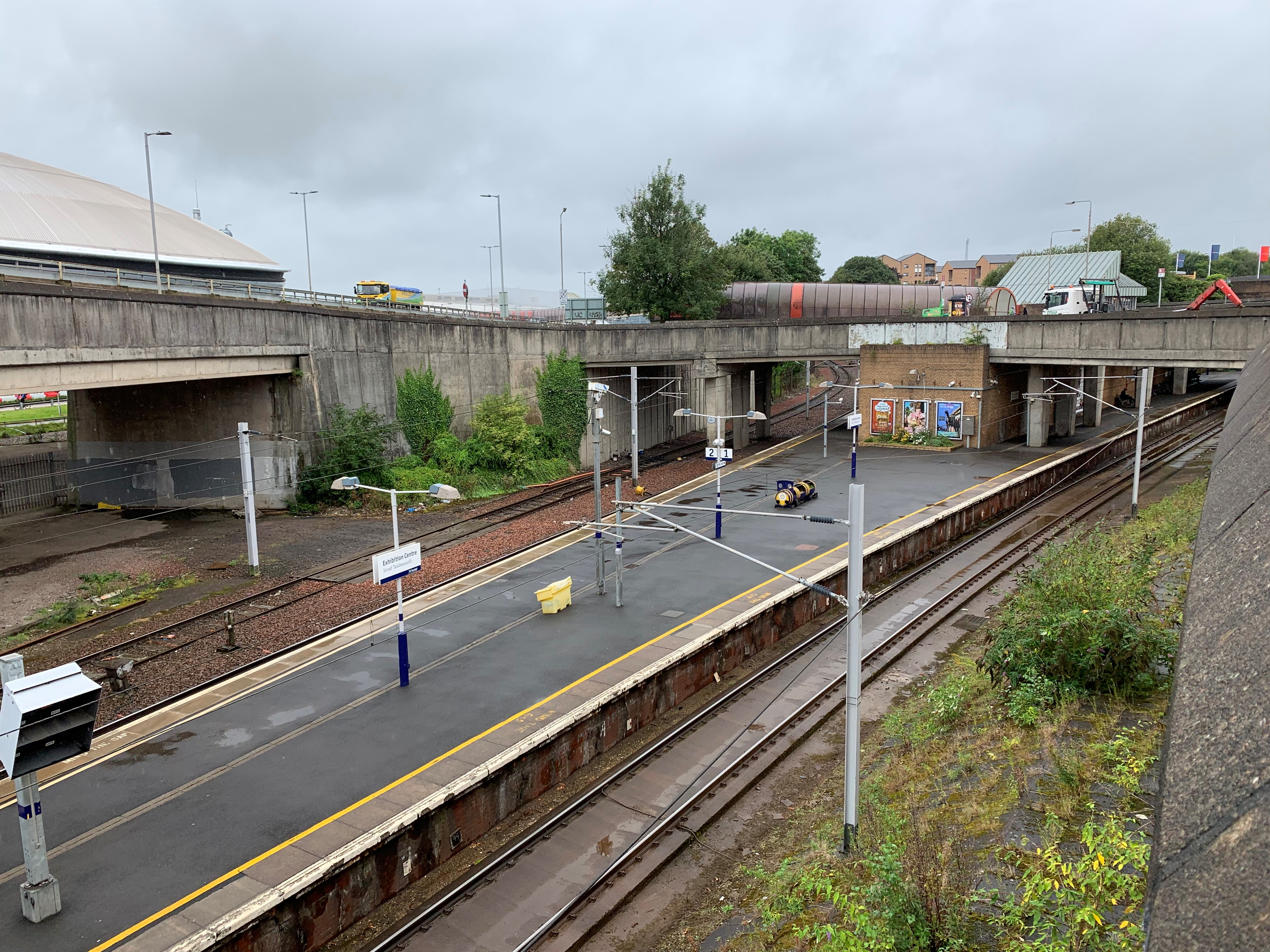

General information
- Location: Finnieston, Glasgow; Scotland
- Coordinates: 55.8611°N 4.2828°W
- Grid reference: NS571655
- Manager: ScotRail
- Transit authority: SPT
- Platforms: 2

Other information
- Station code: EXG
- Fare zone: 1

History
- Original company: Glasgow Central Railway
- Pre-grouping: Caledonian Railway
- Post-grouping: LMS

Key dates
- 26 November 1894: Opened as Stobcross (GCR to Maryhill)
- 5 May 1896: L&DR to Clydebank opened
- 10 August 1896: GCR services commenced through to Glasgow Central
- 3 August 1959: Station closed to passengers
- 5 October 1964: Line closed to all traffic
- 5 November 1979: Reopened as Finnieston
- 1986: Renamed Exhibition Centre

Passengers
- 2021/22: ▲0.809 million
- 2022/23: ▲1.158 million
- 2023/24: ▲1.640 million
- 2024/25: ▲1.773 million
- 2025/26: ▲1.978 million
Location
Notes
- Passenger statistics from the Office of Rail and Road

Exhibition Centre railway station, previously called Finnieston and Stobcross, is a railway station in Glasgow on the Argyle Line. It serves the OVO Hydro, the SEC Centre and the SEC Armadillo, and more broadly the Finnieston area of Glasgow, which are accessible by adjoining footbridge from the island platform. The station is between Anderston and Partick, 4 miles 3 chains (6.5 km) from Rutherglen Central Junction (where the Argyle Line joins the West Coast Main Line). There is a siding adjacent to Platform 2, that can be used as a turnback siding for trains terminating at Anderston or Glasgow Central Low Level.

== History ==
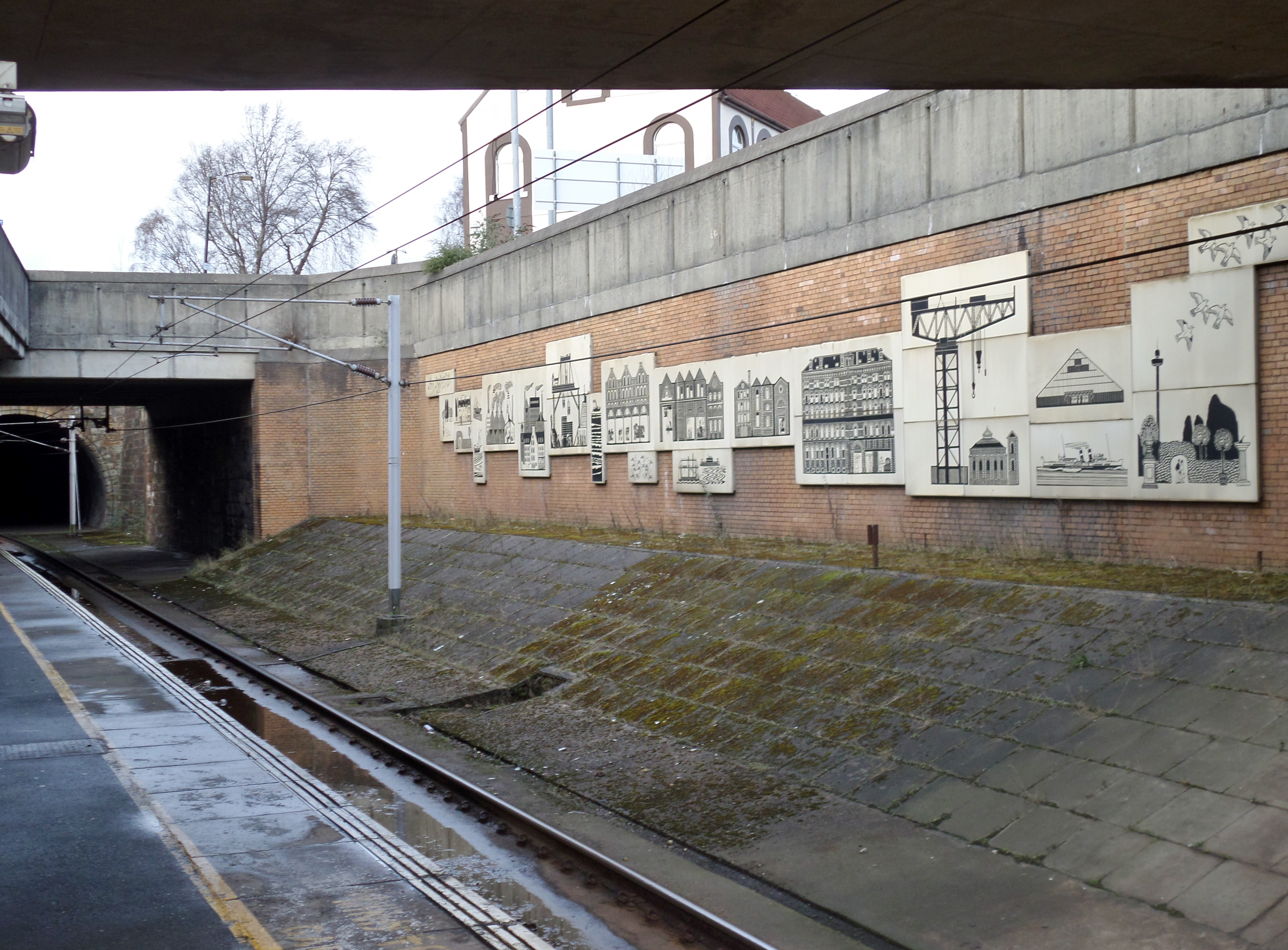
A mural of Clydeside landmarks by Platform 1

The station opened in 1894 or 1896, as Stobcross, and closed on 3 August 1959. Twenty years later, on 5 November 1979, the station reopened as Finnieston, and in 1986 was renamed to Exhibition Centre.

The route to the west is partially used by the Argyle Line link to the North Clyde Line (a new single track tunnel being constructed to connect up at Finnieston West Junction). Previously the line went to Partick Central railway station.

In 2017, the station's signage was changed to Craiglang, after the fictional town from the sitcom Still Game as a live version of the show was playing at the nearby OVO Hydro. Actors Ford Kiernan and Greg Hemphill provided pre-recorded safety announcements during this time. They had previously provided on-board announcements during a 2014 live-show run.

=== Accidents & incidents ===
Heavy rain in December 1994 resulted in the River Kelvin bursting its banks at Kelvinbridge and the resultant torrent through the disused Glasgow Central Railway tunnel flooded the Argyle Line trapping two Class 314s at Glasgow Central Low Level. The station, along with the other stations to Rutherglen opened on 24 September 1995. The line was closed because of flooding again from 30 July to 20 August 2002.

At 08:34 on Monday 3 September 2007, a set of empty coaches derailed after leaving the sidings at Exhibition Centre to start the 08:38 service from Anderston to Motherwell. This derailment resulted in two members of staff being injured and the line between Partick and Rutherglen being closed for two days.

== Facilities ==
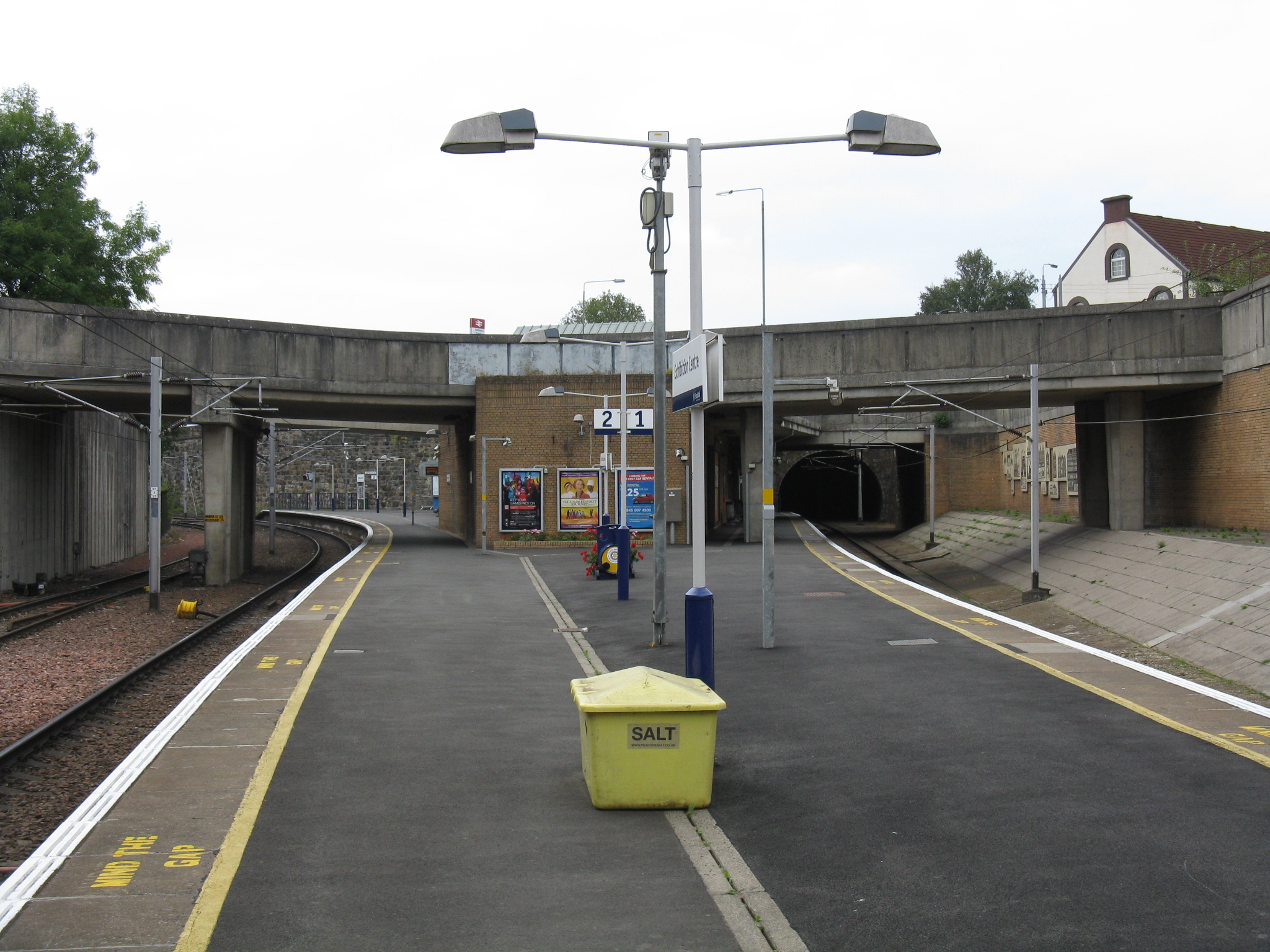
A view of the opposing curves of the platforms, looking westwards

The station has a ticket office and ticket machines, toilets, cycle storage, live departure screens and help points.

== Passenger volume ==
Passenger volume at Exhibition Centre
	2004–05	2005–06	2006–07	2007–08	2008–09	2009–10	2010–11	2011–12	2012–13	2013–14	2014–15	2015–16	2016–17	2017–18	2018–19	2019–20	2020–21	2021–22	2022–23	2023–24	2024–25	2025-26
Entries and exits	499,226	632,930	762,762	866,460	1,019,832	1,054,236	1,171,798	1,317,768	1,369,444	1,375,492	1,639,854	1,742,528	1,891,500	1,847,792	1,943,180	1,959,630	300,276	809,248	1,157,938	1,639,932	1,772,544	1,978,266

The statistics cover twelve month periods that start in April.

== Services ==
As of the May 2026 timetable, on weekdays and Saturdays, there is 6 trains per hour each way. Westbound, trains run to Dalmuir (4 via Yoker and 2 via Singer), and a few peak time and late evening services terminate at Garscadden and Milngavie. Eastbound, there are 3 trains per hour to Motherwell (2 via Hamilton and 2 via Whifflet) and 2 trains per hour to Larkhall. On Sundays the service is broadly similar with 4 trains per hour, westbound to Milngavie and Balloch (2 trains per hour to each), and eastbound to Motherwell (2 trains via Hamilton and 1 via Whifflet) and Larkhall.

Preceding station	National Rail	Following station
Anderston	ScotRail; Argyle Line	Partick
	Historical railways	
Anderston; Line and Station open	Glasgow Central Railway; Caledonian Railway	Kelvinbridge; Line and Station closed
Anderston; Line and Station open	Lanarkshire and Dunbartonshire Railway; Caledonian Railway	Partick Central; Line partially open; Station closed

== Bibliography ==
- Brailsford, Martyn, ed. (December 2017) [1987]. Railway Track Diagrams 1: Scotland & Isle of Man (6th ed.). Frome: Trackmaps. ISBN 978-0-9549866-9-8.
- Butt, R. V. J. (October 1995). The Directory of Railway Stations: details every public and private passenger station, halt, platform and stopping place, past and present (1st ed.). Sparkford: Patrick Stephens Ltd. ISBN 978-1-85260-508-7. OCLC 60251199. OL 11956311M.
- Jowett, Alan (March 1989). Jowett's Railway Atlas of Great Britain and Ireland: From Pre-Grouping to the Present Day (1st ed.). Sparkford: Patrick Stephens Ltd. ISBN 978-1-85260-086-0. OCLC 22311137.
- Quick, Michael (2023). Railway Passenger Stations in Great Britain: A Chronology (PDF) (5th ed.). London: Railway and Canal Historical Society.
- "Hidden Glasgow on Partick Central".
- "Hidden Glasgow on 1994 Floods".
