= Botanic Gardens railway station =

Disused railway station in Kelvinside, Glasgow, Scotland

Botanic Gardens
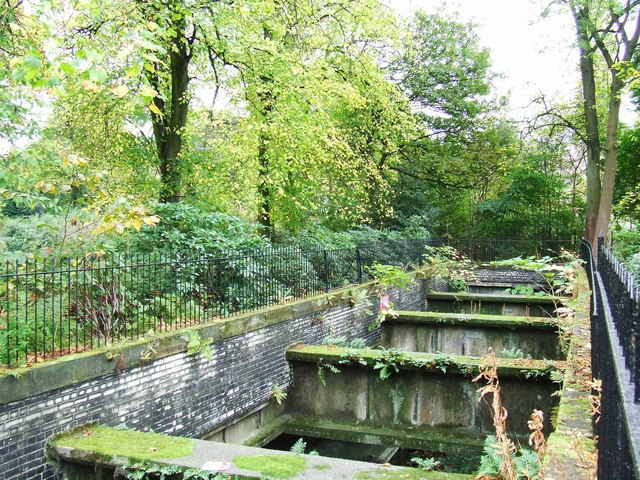
- Botanic Gardens station in 2007

General information
- Location: Kelvinside, Glasgow; Scotland
- Coordinates: 55.87918°N 4.29129°W
- Platforms: 2

Other information
- Status: Closed

History
- Original company: Glasgow Central Railway
- Pre-grouping: Caledonian Railway
- Post-grouping: LMS

Key dates
- 10 August 1896: Opened
- 1 January 1917: Closed
- 2 March 1919: Re-opened
- 6 February 1939: Closed to Passengers
- 22 March 1970: Station building destroyed by fire
Location

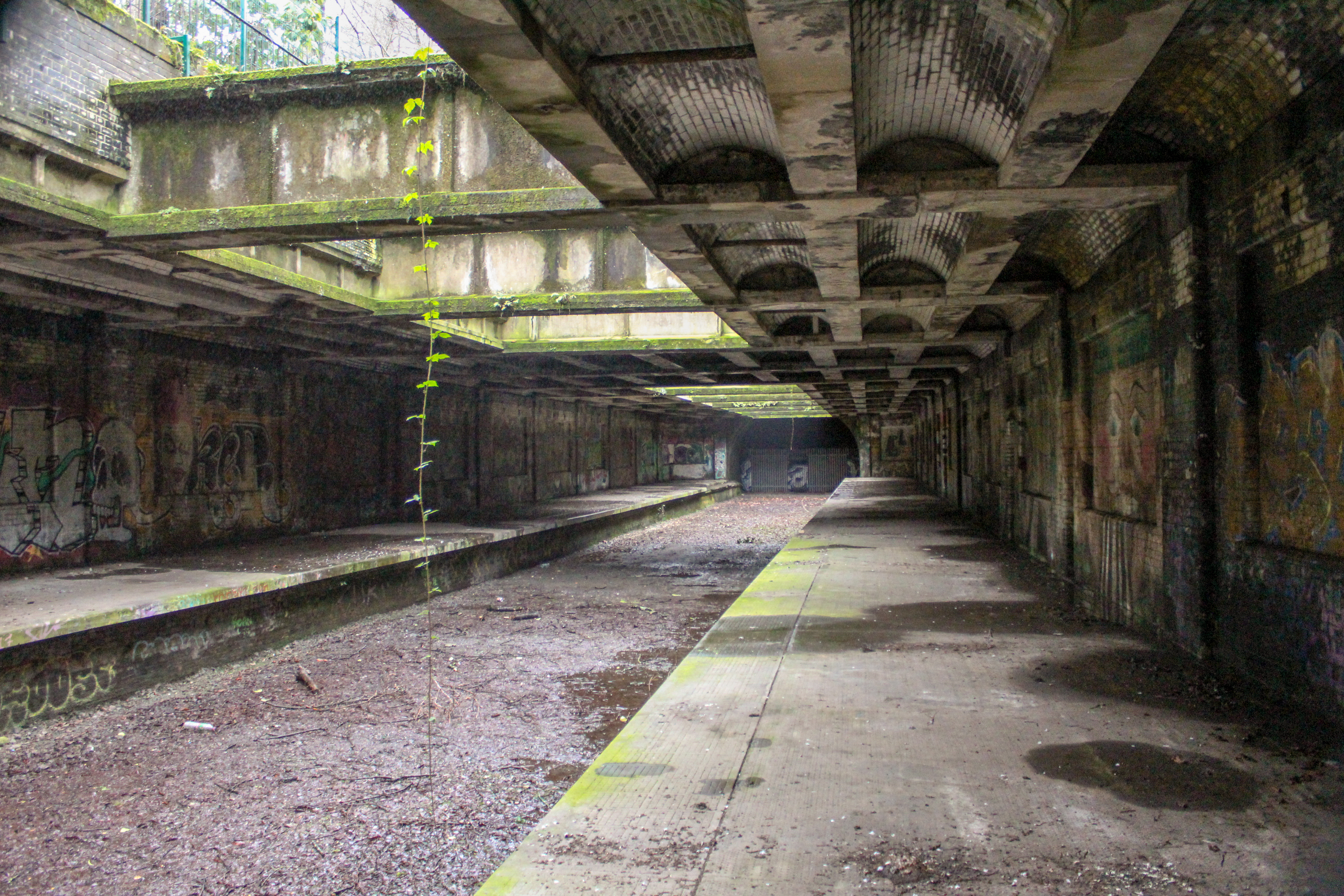
Botanic Gardens station in 2023

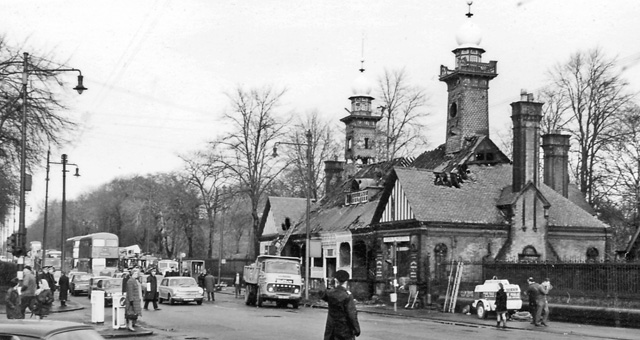
Remains of the station in 1970

Botanic Gardens railway station was a railway station serving the Botanic Gardens located in the Kelvinside area in the West End of Glasgow.

== History ==
The station was opened on 10 August 1896 by the Glasgow Central Railway. The station building was on ground level, and the platforms were underground, beneath the Glasgow Botanic Gardens. It was closed between 1 January 1917 and 2 March 1919 due to wartime economy, and closed permanently to passengers on 6 February 1939, with the line being closed on 5 October 1964.

Preceding station	Historical railways	Following station
Kelvinbridge	Caledonian Railway; Glasgow Central Railway	Kirklee

== Architecture ==
The station building was an ornate red brick structure with two towers sporting a clock and Caledonian Railway monogram, topped by domes reminiscent of a Russian orthodox church. The extant, but disused, station building at Possil is of a similar design. It was a well-known landmark along Great Western Road and was designed by the renowned Glasgow railway architect of the period, James Miller.

Miller also designed the next station on the line at Kelvinbridge and went on to design the main buildings for the 1901 Glasgow International Exhibition in nearby Kelvingrove Park and the interiors of the famous Clyde-built ocean liners, the RMS Lusitania in 1907 and RMS Aquitania in 1914.

== Use following closure ==
The building was converted into shops after the station's 1939 closure and by the late 1960s was occupied by a popular café called 'The Silver Slipper', a nightclub called 'Sgt. Peppers' and a plumbers shop, 'Morton's'. It was ravaged by fire on the night of 22 March 1970.

== Destruction by fire ==
Local Glasgow newspapers, the Evening Times and the Evening Citizen, of 23 March 1970 stated the fire started after a 'Battle of the Bands' contest had been held in the nightclub and it was likely someone had left a cigarette burning in the attic as it was primarily the roof space that had burned resulting in the decision of the fire brigade to pull down the two domed towers for safety reasons the following day. The cafe owner's German Shepherd dog died of smoke inhalation but no humans were injured.

Despite the outer walls of the building remaining intact and the damage confined largely to the roof area, the decision was taken by the then Glasgow Corporation not to undertake repairs and instead to completely demolish the building. At the time of the fire, plans were being considered to demolish the building as part of a controversial scheme to widen Great Western Road and this might lie behind the decision not to repair the building despite its prominent and recognisable presence in the West End for seventy-four years and its housing of three viable local businesses.

== Today ==
The site of Botanic Gardens Station remains derelict to this day, over fifty years after the fire. The platforms still remain underground where they can be seen from above through still-open air vents in the Botanic Gardens, and the floor of the building is still visible within the fenced-off section of the gardens marking where it stood. The platforms are accessible via the tunnel portal at the Kirklee end of the gardens. An abandoned tramway kiosk designed in the same style as the building and built in 1903 is still present at the site. The site is heavily overgrown, vandalised and dilapidated, and is considered dangerous to enter.

== Redevelopment ==
In September 2007, it was reported plans were under consideration to redevelop the site as a bar/restaurant/nightclub/exhibition space and miniature railway which would involve completely rebuilding the station building to its original design on its footprint. The plans were met with considerable opposition from local people who organised a campaign group largely objecting to the idea of a nightclub appearing in a tranquil place like the gardens.

It was reported on 17 April 2008 that the campaign against the plans had been successful and Glasgow City Council had abandoned the plans. There are no current plans to redevelop the site.
