= Kelvinbridge =

Bridge in Glasgow, Scotland

Kelvinbridge Drochaid Chaol-Aibhne (Scottish Gaelic)
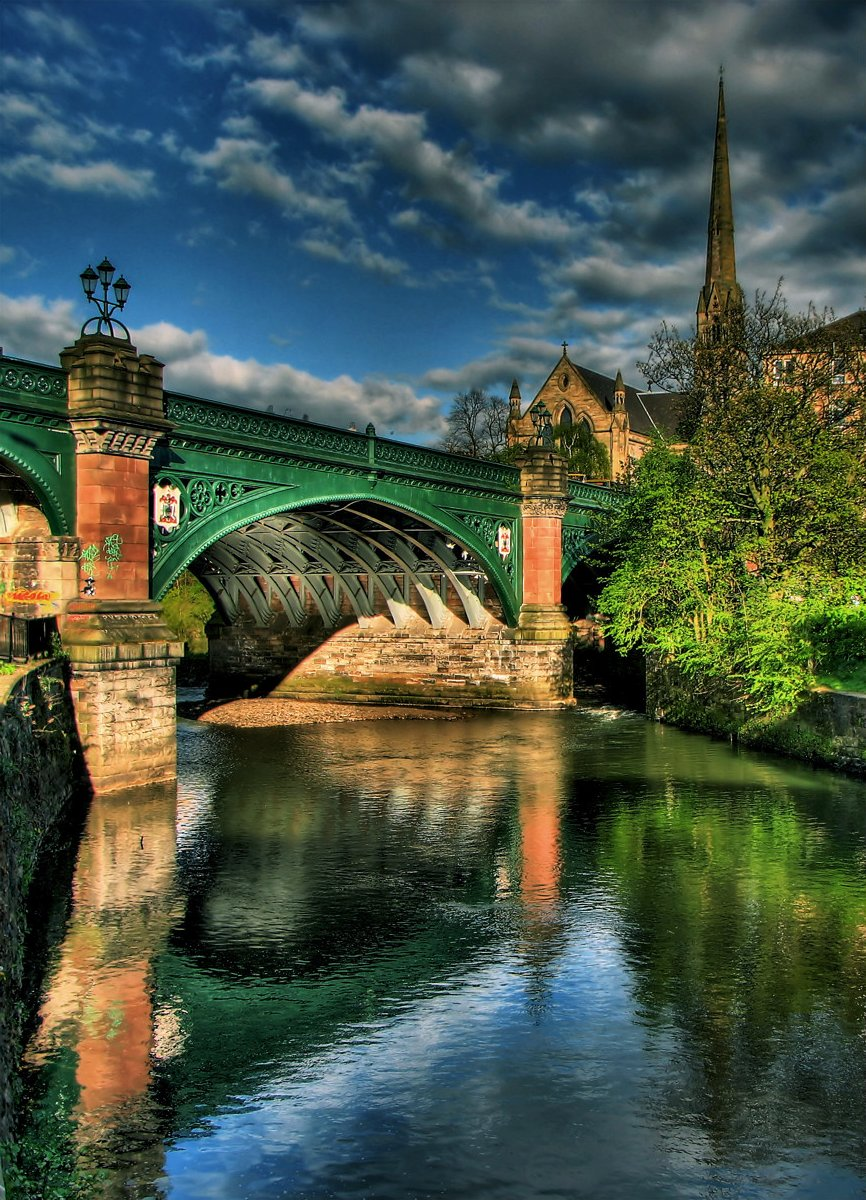
- The Great Western Road bridge over the River Kelvin on a sunny day
- Coordinates: 55.874763°N 4.279765°W
- OS grid reference: NS 57464 66972
- Carries: A82
- Crosses: River Kelvin
- Locale: Glasgow
- Other name: Great Western Bridge

Listed Building – Category A
- Official name: Great Western Road Bridge
- Designated: 19 May 1986
- Reference no.: LB32197

Location
- Interactive map of Kelvinbridge

Kelvinbridge is the common name of the Great Western Bridge, a cast iron road and pedestrian bridge located in the West End of the city of Glasgow, Scotland, built to carry the Great Western Road (A82) at a high level across the River Kelvin. Completed in 1891 by Bell & Miller, it replaced an older stone bridge (completed 1840), and has a similar design to the Partick Bridge crossing the same river, located a short distance to the south-west. It has been a Category A listed structure since 1986.

In the early 19th century, the first Great Western Bridge (1825) provided a crossing point across the boundary of the city and into the neighbouring burgh of Hillhead, which was incorporated into the city later. It was at a low level, whereas the second, larger bridge was built over a high span.

The river lends its name to adjacent places at several points along its course (Kelvindale, Kelvingrove Park, Kelvinhaugh and Kelvinside for example) and so there are several 'Kelvin Bridges', including one several miles away in Torrance.

The Great Western Road bridge over the River Kelvin on an overcast day (2007)

Adjacent to the bridge is Kelvinbridge subway station on the Glasgow Subway - one of the deepest on the circuit due to the proximity of the river - on the south east-side of the bridge. This was also the location of Kelvinbridge railway station on the Glasgow Central Railway. Due to these other uses, the name Kelvinbridge is also used to refer to the residential areas in the vicinity of the bridge, encompassing parts of the neighbourhoods of Woodside, Woodlands, Kelvinside and Hillhead.

The Glasgow Academy private school is nearby on the Hillhead side of the valley, with Lansdowne Church (1863) - featuring a spire which at 66 metres (217 ft) is among the tallest structures in the city - on the opposite bank. Due to the proximity of the University of Glasgow, the Kelvinbridge locality accommodates many students. In 2019, the area was included in a list of the 50 "coolest neighbourhoods in the world" by Time Out magazine.

== See also ==
- List of bridges in Scotland
