= SEC Armadillo =

Auditorium located in Glasgow, Scotland

- The 2k Armadillo
- The SED Armadillo from Pacific Quay, 2021
- Interactive map of SEC Armadillo
- Former names: Clyde Auditorium (1994–2017)
- Address: Scottish Events Campus, Exhibition Way; Glasgow; G3 8YW
- Location: Glasgow, Scotland
- Coordinates: 55.859496°N 4.287962°W
- Owner: Scottish Event Campus Limited
- Capacity: 3,000
- Type: Conference hall and concert venue
- Public transit: Exhibition Centre railway station

Construction
- Groundbreaking: September 1995; 31 years ago
- Built: September 1995; 31 years ago to August 1997; 29 years ago
- Opened: 7 September 1997; 29 years ago
- Cost: £30 million
- Architect: Foster and Partners
- Structural engineer: Arup Group

Website
- Venue Info (Scottish Event Campus)

The SEC Armadillo, originally known as the Clyde Auditorium, is a concert and conference venue located on the banks of the River Clyde in Glasgow, Scotland. It forms part of the Scottish Event Campus (SEC), alongside the SEC Centre and the OVO Hydro. Designed by the architectural practice Foster + Partners, the building opened in September 1997 as an expansion of the Scottish Exhibition and Conference Centre (SECC).

The building was developed to provide a purpose-built auditorium capable of accommodating large conferences and performances, complementing the exhibition facilities already available at the SECC. Its distinctive exterior, formed by a series of overlapping curved structures, led to its popular nickname, which subsequently became its recognised name.

== Background ==
=== Development of the Clyde waterfront ===
The development of the SEC Armadillo formed part of the wider transformation of Glasgow's former industrial waterfront. The River Clyde had historically been central to the city's shipbuilding, manufacturing and maritime trade. During the second half of the 20th century, changes in shipping and industrial activity contributed to the decline of several riverside docks and industrial sites. The Scottish Development Agency supported the proposal for a purpose-built exhibition and conference centre in Glasgow in 1979. The former Queen's Dock at Finnieston was selected as the site. Following preparatory works and the reclamation of the dock area, construction of the original exhibition centre began in 1983. The facility opened in 1985 and subsequently became an important venue for exhibitions, concerts and conferences.

The opening of the exhibition centre represented an early stage in the redevelopment of this section of the Clyde waterfront. Further investment in cultural, commercial and visitor facilities contributed to the changing character of the surrounding area during the following decades.

=== Planning and construction ===
By 1994, the SECC's management had identified the need for a dedicated conference auditorium to complement its existing exhibition halls. The centre's original facilities had been adapted to accommodate conferences, but research undertaken for the development indicated a requirement for a larger, purpose-built space capable of hosting more than 3,000 delegates.

The new auditorium was designed by Foster + Partners, the architectural practice founded by Norman Foster. Construction began in September 1995, with the project forming part of the continuing expansion of the SECC complex. The structural engineering was undertaken by Arup, which provided engineering services for the building, including civil, structural, mechanical, electrical and geotechnical design. The project presented significant engineering challenges because of the auditorium's distinctive curved form and the complex arrangement of its structural components. The Clyde Auditorium was completed in 1997 and officially opened on 7 September that year, hosting the 69th conference of the American Society of Travel Agents. Its opening extended the SECC's capacity to accommodate major international conferences and other large-scale events.

=== Architecture and design ===
The auditorium's design is characterised by a series of overlapping, curved external sections that create its distinctive silhouette. The building's appearance has frequently been associated with the shape of an armadillo, giving rise to the nickname that became widely used by the public. The design also incorporated the practical requirements of a large conference venue. Its auditorium and associated facilities were intended to accommodate conferences, presentations and performances, while providing connections to the wider exhibition and meeting spaces of the SECC. The building has sometimes been compared visually with the Sydney Opera House because of its sculptural roofline. However, the engineering account published by Arup documents the structure's distinctive system of curved shells and supporting steelwork, demonstrating the technical complexity behind its appearance.

=== Opening and subsequent development ===
The SEC Armadillo alongside the Finnieston Crane on the River Clyde

Following its opening in 1997, the Clyde Auditorium became an established part of Glasgow's conference and entertainment infrastructure. The SEC's own historical records report increased conference and concert business following the venue's introduction. In 1999, the organisation recorded 57 conferences and an economic benefit to Glasgow of £26.5 million across its business activities. The auditorium continued to operate alongside the exhibition halls, providing a dedicated space for events that required a large audience or conference gathering. Its facilities were designed to support different seating configurations and a range of event formats, including conferences, corporate functions and live performances.

In September 2013, the opening of the Hydro, subsequently known as the OVO Hydro, added a much larger arena to the wider complex. The auditorium remained one of the principal venues within the campus, serving a different role from the arena and the exhibition halls. In 2017, the Scottish Exhibition and Conference Centre was rebranded as the Scottish Event Campus. The Clyde Auditorium became known officially as the SEC Armadillo, reflecting the nickname by which the building had become widely recognised.

=== Present-day ===
The SEC Armadillo forms one of the three principal venues at the Scottish Event Campus, which is owned and operated by Scottish Event Campus Limited. The organisation is majority-owned by Glasgow City Council, with the remaining shareholding held by private institutions. The auditorium has a capacity of up to 3,000 people, depending on the event configuration, and continues to host conferences, meetings, corporate events and performances. Its development reflects the wider evolution of Glasgow's waterfront from a predominantly industrial area into a location for cultural, commercial and visitor activities.

== Accolades and recognition ==
Since opening in 1997, the SEC Armadillo has hosted a variety of international conferences, entertainment programmes, award ceremonies and sporting events. Its distinctive architecture has also contributed to its recognition as a landmark on Glasgow's waterfront. The SEC Armadillo is recognised for its distinctive architectural design and its contribution to Glasgow's waterfront. Designed by Foster + Partners, the building has become a recognisable feature of the city skyline and is frequently associated with the regeneration of the former industrial waterfront.

In 2026, the building was included among the finalists for Architecture Today's Test of Time Awards, which recognise buildings that have demonstrated lasting architectural value. The nomination placed the SEC Armadillo among a selection of established architectural projects assessed for their continuing relevance and quality. The wider Scottish Event Campus has received industry recognition, including being named the best UK venue at the Exhibition News Awards in 2018. This accolade related to the campus as a whole rather than specifically to the SEC Armadillo.

== Events ==
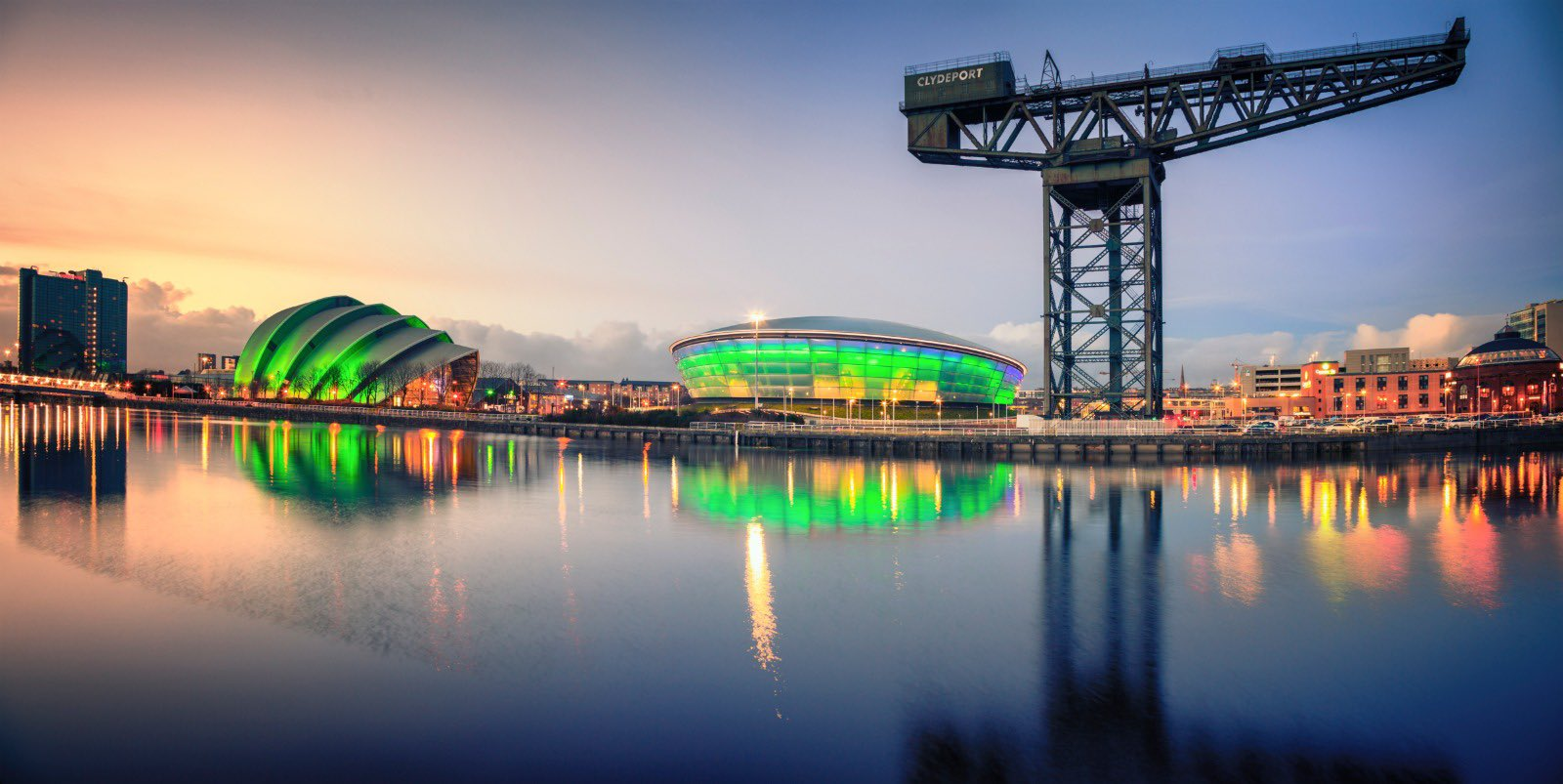
The SEC Armadillo and OVO Hydro illuminated green during the 2021 United Nations Climate Change Conference

One of the venue's most widely publicised events was the Glasgow audition for the third series of Britain's Got Talent in 2009, during which Scottish singer Susan Boyle performed "I Dreamed a Dream" from the musical Les Misérables. Her audition attracted international media attention after being broadcast on television in April 2009, becoming a significant moment in the singer's career. In August 2005, the auditorium formed part of the facilities used for Interaction, the 63rd World Science Fiction Convention, held in Glasgow from 4 to 8 August. The convention included the presentation of the Hugo Awards, an international literary award recognising achievements in science fiction and fantasy.

The SEC Armadillo has also hosted major sporting competitions. During the 2014 Commonwealth Games in Glasgow, it was the venue for weightlifting competitions, contributing to the Scottish Event Campus's role in hosting the international sporting event. The venue was used again for weightlifting and para-weightlifting during the 2026 Commonwealth Games in Glasgow. In addition to these events, the auditorium regularly accommodates conferences, corporate gatherings, performances and entertainment productions. Its flexible seating arrangements allow it to be configured for events of different sizes, with a maximum capacity of approximately 3,000 people.

== See also ==
- SEC Centre
- OVO Hydro
