= Dawsholm railway station =

Former railway station in Scotland

Coordinates: 55.8918°N 4.3002°W

Dawsholm Railway Station (Grid Reference NS562689) was a railway station in Glasgow, Scotland. The station opened for passengers on 1 October 1896 and closed on 1 May 1908 but Dawsholm locomotive shed, code 65D, continued in use until 1964.

== See also ==
- List of closed railway stations in Britain: D-F

Preceding station	Historical railways	Following station
Kirklee	Caledonian Railway; Glasgow Central Railway	Terminus
