= Kelvinbridge railway station =

Former railway station in Scotland

Coordinates: 55.8747°N 4.2811°W

Kelvinbridge
- The remains of the station in 2007.

General information
- Location: Kelvinbridge, Glasgow; Scotland
- Platforms: 2

Other information
- Status: Disused

History
- Original company: Glasgow Central Railway
- Pre-grouping: Caledonian Railway
- Post-grouping: LMS

Key dates
- 10 August 1896: Opened
- 4 August 1952: Station closed to passengers
- 6 July 1964: Station closed to freight
- 5 October 1964: Line closed
- August 1968: Station building destroyed by fire
Location

Kelvinbridge was a railway station for the Kelvinbridge area in the West End of Glasgow, close to Kelvinbridge subway station on the Glasgow Subway.

== Chronology ==
This station was opened on 10 August 1896.

It served as the mainline station for taking visitors to the 1901 Glasgow International Exhibition.

It was closed to passengers on 4 August 1952 and to freight on 6 July 1964, with the line being closed on 5 October 1964.

The building was destroyed by fire in August 1968.

== Description of the site ==
The line entered the station site in the south east corner passing under Gibson Street next to the River Kelvin and ran alongside the east side of the river until reaching the north west corner when it crossed the river prior to passing under Caledonian Crescent where the station building was located. The goods yard was located to the east of the line, and was converted to a park and ride car park in 1965.

The station building was designed by well known Glasgow architect James Miller who designed many other Caledonian Railway stations, including Botanic Gardens which was the next stop on the line. It was in a style similar to other stations designed by Miller at the time. It was destroyed by a fire started by children while abandoned in August 1968. The outer walls with some decorative stonework as well as the base of an entrance vestibule with the pattern and fragments of the black and white checked floor tiles remain. Above the station site and mouth of the tunnel is Caledonian Mansions which was built by the Caledonian Railway company on land it purchased for tunnel construction. The company's monogram is still visible on the east side of the mansions on Caledonian Crescent, just uphill from the station site.

At the north west corner of the site the formation of the line from the station towards Botanic Gardens passes under Otago Street where the station buildings were located, before entering the tunnel under Great Western Road.

It was through the tunnel (at the south of the site) to Stobcross that the River Kelvin flowed when it burst its banks at the site of the station goods yard in December 1994. As part of the flood defence measures put in place, a bank was put in place in front of the tunnel mouth.

Preceding station	Historical railways	Following station
Stobcross; Line closed; Station open	Caledonian Railway; Glasgow Central Railway	Botanic Gardens; Line and station closed

== Gallery ==
Looking across the railway bridge towards the location of the station buildings.

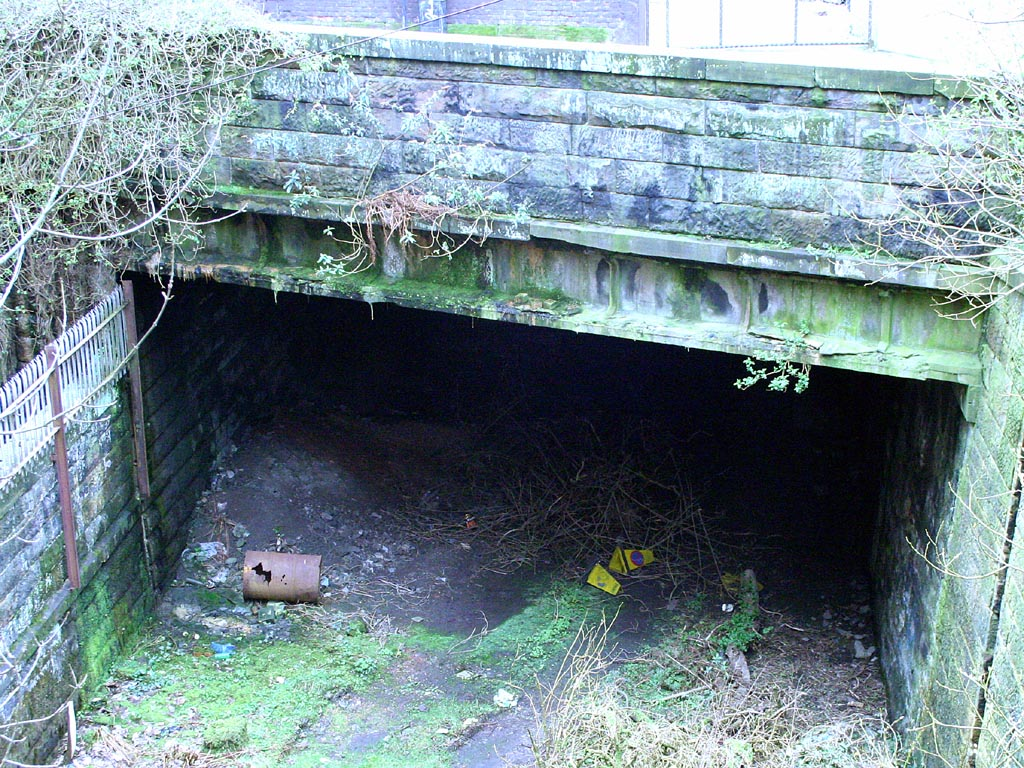
The line passing under Caledonian Crescent.

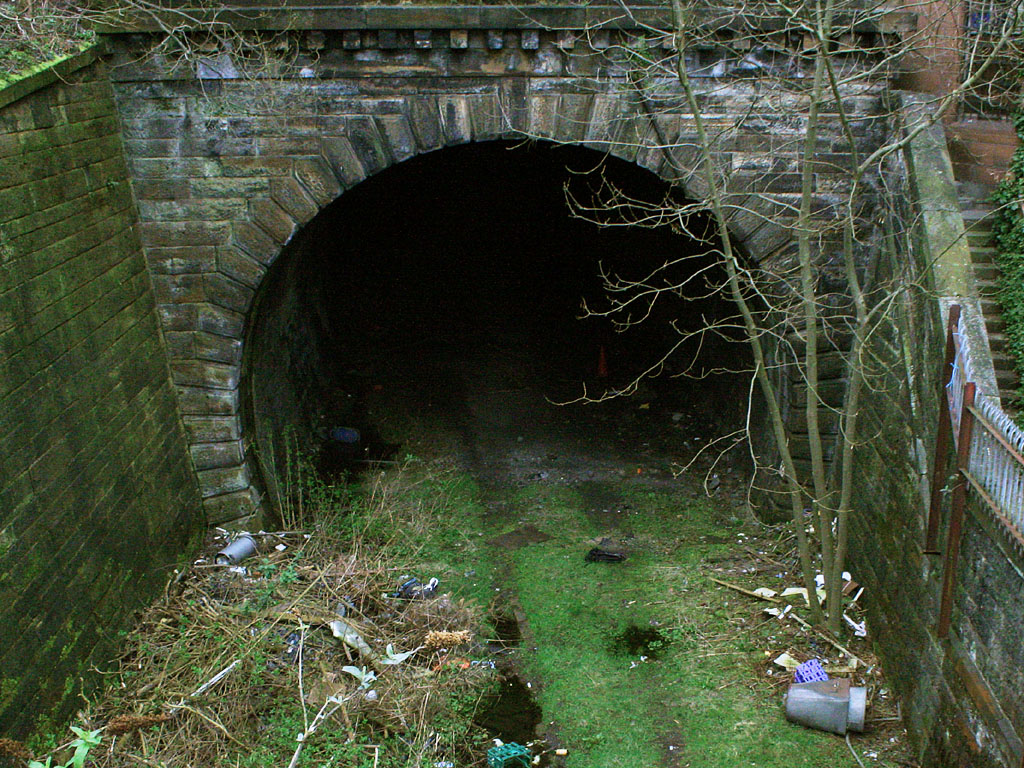
The entrance of the tunnel to Botanic Gardens.

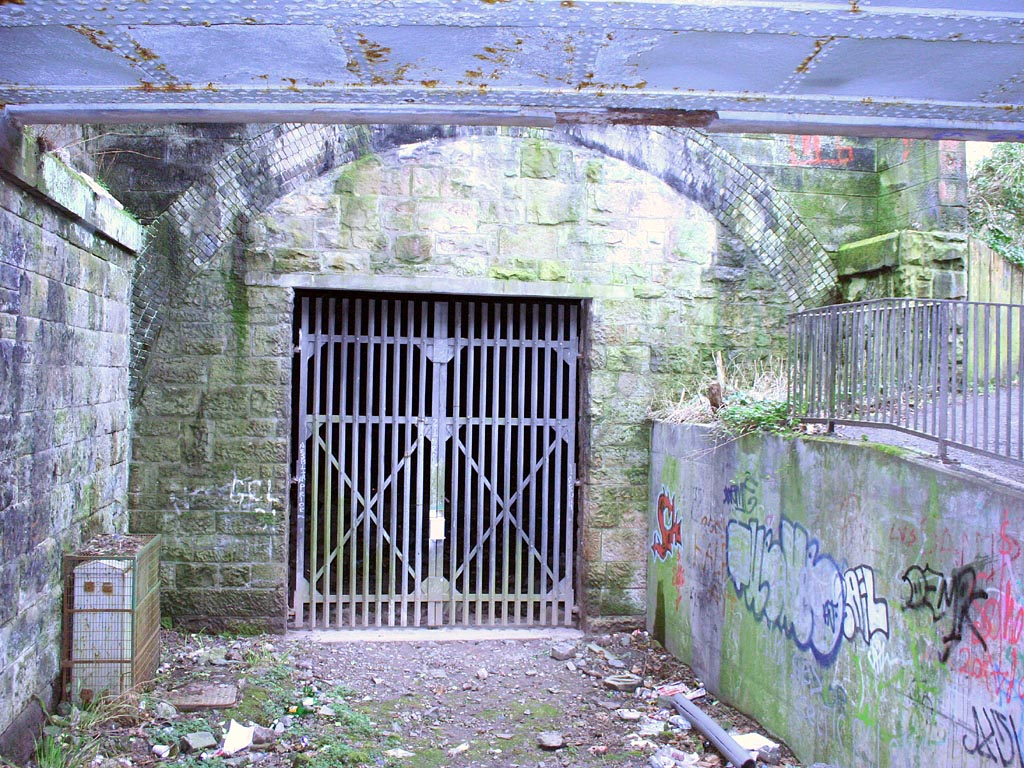
The entrance to the tunnel to Stobcross.

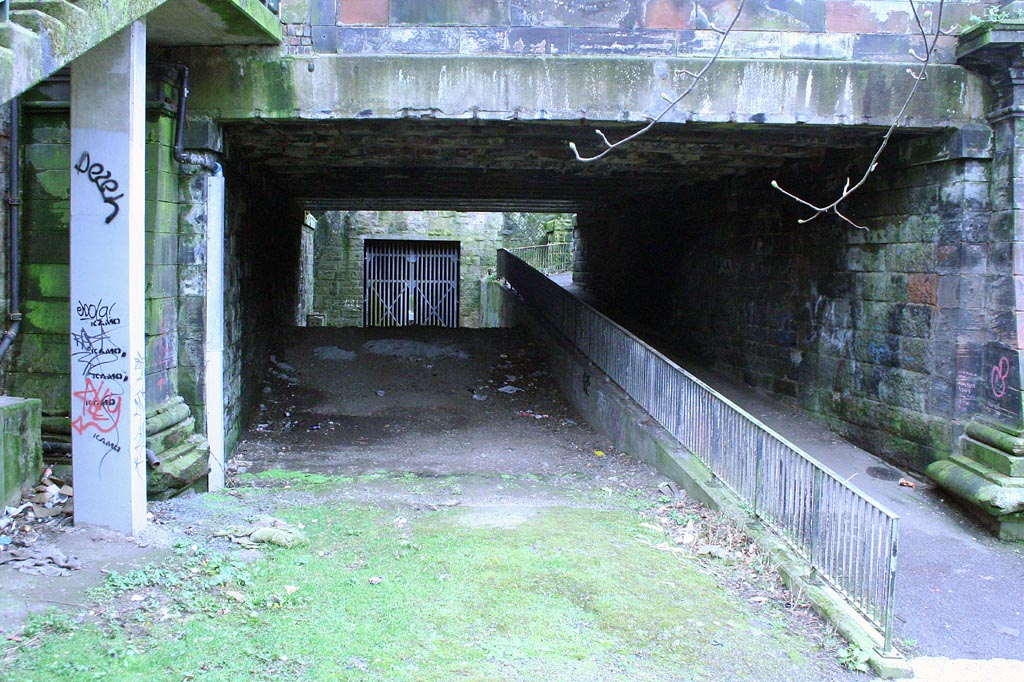
Under the bridge is the bank put in place following the December 1994 flood to prevent water flowing down the tunnel.
