= SEC Centre =

Exhibition centre in Glasgow, Scotland

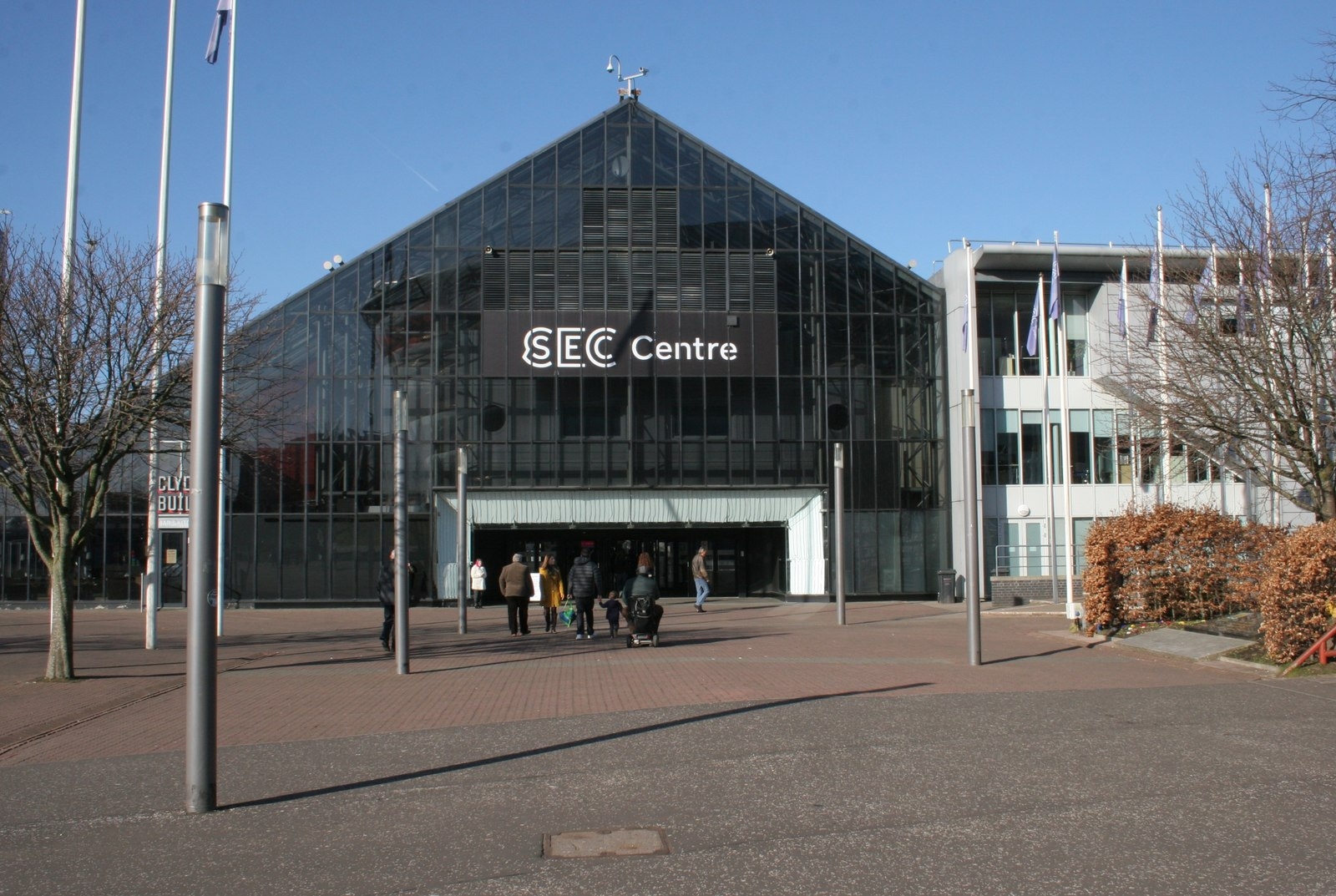
- Main entrance to the SEC Centre in 2018
- Former names: Scottish Exhibition Centre (planning/construction); Scottish Exhibition and Conference Centre (1985–2017)
- Address: Exhibition Way; Glasgow; G3 8YW
- Location: Finnieston, Glasgow, Scotland
- Coordinates: 55.86085°N 4.28812°W
- Owner: Scottish Event Campus Limited
- Capacity: 5,000 (Hall 3); 10,000 (Hall 4)
- Public transit: Exhibition Centre railway station

Construction
- Opened: 6 September 1985
- Renovated: 2000
- Expanded: 1995; 1996; 1997
- Cost: £36 million

Website
- www.sec.co.uk

The SEC Centre (originally known as the Scottish Exhibition and Conference Centre until 2017) is Scotland's largest exhibition centre, located in Glasgow, Scotland. It is one of the three main venues within the Scottish Event Campus.

Since the opening of the original buildings in 1985, the complex has undergone two major expansions; the first being the SEC Armadillo in 1997, and then the OVO Hydro in 2013. The venue's holding company SEC Limited, is 91% owned by Glasgow City Council and 9% owned by private investors. It is probably best known for hosting concerts, particularly in Hall 4 and Hall 3.

== Development history ==
The Scottish Development Agency first supported the construction of an exhibition centre in Glasgow in 1979. A site at the former Queen's Dock on the north bank of the Clyde at Finnieston, which had closed to navigation in 1969, was selected. Land reclamation works started in 1982 using rubble from the demolished St Enoch railway station. The construction of the SEC Centre buildings began on the site in 1983.

=== Main Building ===
The Main Building was completed and opened in 1985, with a concert by the Royal Scottish National Orchestra in Hall 1. It later held the Grand International Show in Hall 4 as part of the 1988 Glasgow Garden Festival. In 1990, the SEC Centre was one of the hubs of Glasgow's year as European City of Culture.

Upon its opening, the Centre quickly gained its nickname from the local press and thus to general usage, "The Big Red Shed", owing to its outward appearance, which resembled a giant red painted warehouse. The nickname became redundant after the Main Building was expanded and painted grey in 1997.

The SEC Centre occupies 64 acres (260,000 m^{2}) of land – most of which is surface car parking space – and hosts numerous music concerts, exhibitions and professional conferences. The SEC Centre also has its own railway station, Exhibition Centre, on the Argyle Line of Glasgow's suburban railway network. The 16 storey Forum Hotel (now part of the Crowne Plaza chain) was opened on the site in 1989.

In September 1996, a new 5,095 m^{2} (54,840 sq ft) exhibition hall, Hall 3, was opened.

=== SEC Armadillo ===
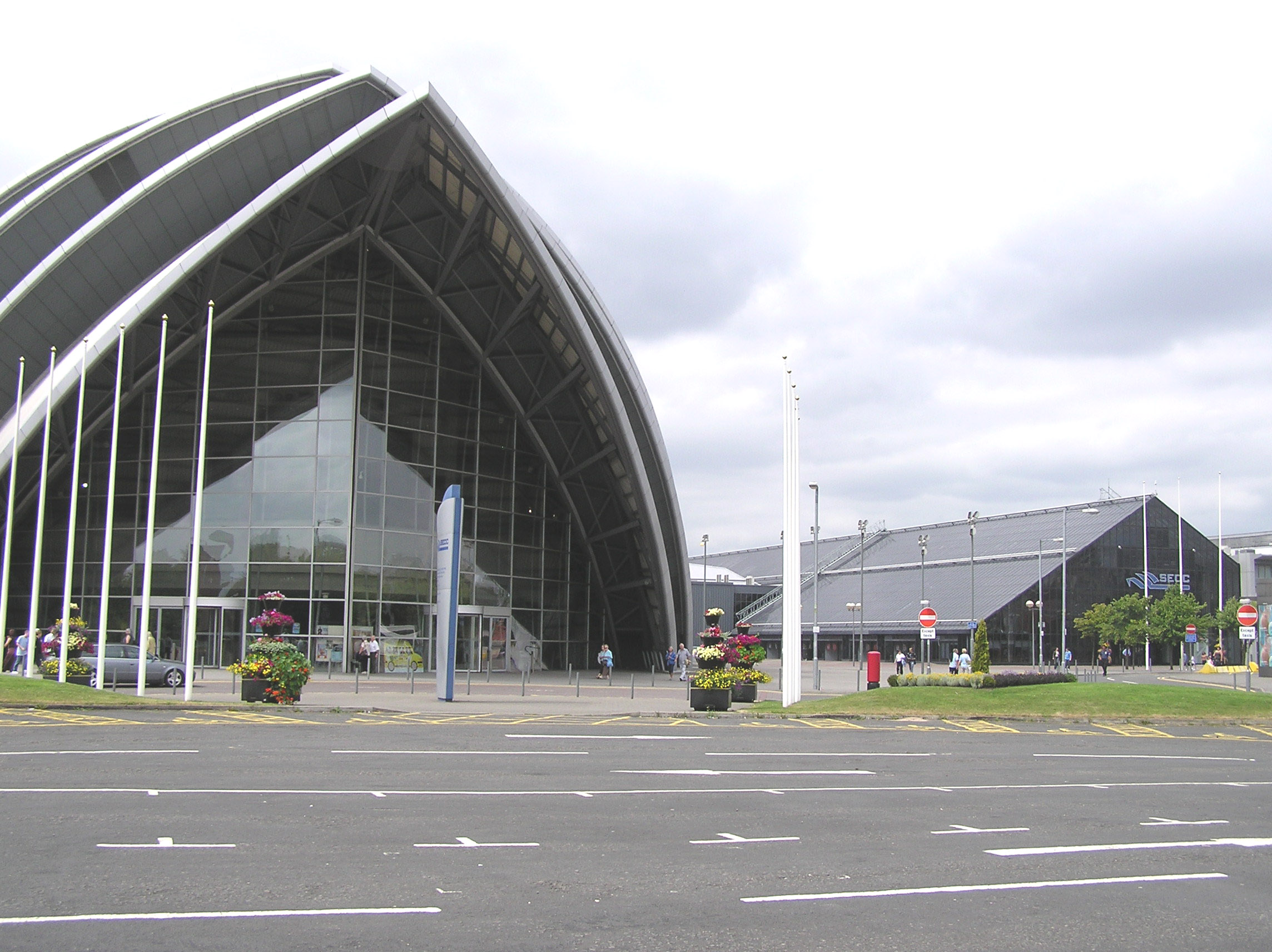
The SEC Armadillo with the SEC Centre behind it

In September 1995, construction began on a new building – the Clyde Auditorium – to become part of the SECC complex. Designed by award-winning architect Sir Norman Foster and often called "the armadillo" by Glaswegians, this new 3,000 capacity building was completed in August 1997.

=== Queens Dock 2 expansion ===
In April 2004, the owners SEC Ltd again commissioned Foster and Partners to design a £562 million regeneration of the Queen's Dock area, under the name QD2 – so called as this is the second regeneration of the former Queen's Dock area since the centre's inception. This project incorporated OVO Hydro, a 12,500 seat, £50 million concert arena for the SECC, which opened as "SSE Hydro" in September 2013.

=== Shows and events ===
The venue hosted the Eurovision Dance Contest 2008. The SECC hosted the Girls' Day Out Show in 2009, 2010 and 2012. It staged The Scottish Golf Show in 2009 and 2010. The venue annually stages the popular BBC Good Food Show. On 15 November 2015, it played host to Insane Championship Wrestling's biggest show of the year, Fear & Loathing VIII.

The SEC Centre has hosted the World Science Fiction convention three times: as Intersection, the 53rd World Science Fiction convention in 1995; as Interaction, the 63rd World Science Fiction Convention in 2005 (including the SEC Armadillo); and again as Glasgow 2024 in 2024.

In June 2012, Irish pop band Westlife were honoured with four specially commissioned bar stools (to be a permanent fixture at the venue) to mark 49 performances at the SEC Centre where they entertained over 380,000 fans over the years, selling more tickets than any other act.

=== NHS Louisa Jordan ===
The SEC Centre hosted the 2021 United Nations Climate Change Conference. Originally scheduled to be held in 2020, the conference was postponed due to the COVID-19 pandemic. Due to the same pandemic, the SEC Centre was turned into a COVID-19 critical care hospital under the name NHS Louisa Jordan, and run by NHS Scotland. Initially (as of 8 April 2020), it had capacity for 300 beds, with an expansion to over 1,000 if needed. The venue was never used for COVID-19 critical care and was instead used for medical appointments, blood donations, staff training and COVID-19 vaccinations. Work began in July 2021 to prepare it for hosting the rescheduled Climate Change Conference in October and November 2021.

Preceded by Television Centre; London	Eurovision Dance Contest; Venue; 2008	Succeeded by Heydar Aliyev Sports and Concert Complex; Baku
