= Gushetfaulds railway station =

Disused railway station in Mount Florida, Glasgow

Coordinates: 55.8416°N 4.2566°W

Gushetfaulds

General information
- Location: Mount Florida, Glasgow; Scotland
- Platforms: 2

Other information
- Status: Disused

History
- Original company: Caledonian Railway
- Pre-grouping: Caledonian Railway

Key dates
- 6 April 1885: Opened as Cathcart Road
- 1 July 1886: Name changed to Gushetfaulds
- 1 May 1907: Closed
Location

Gushetfaulds railway station served the area of Mount Florida, Glasgow, Scotland, from 1885 to 1907 on the Gordon Street lines.

== History ==
The station was opened as Cathcart Road on 6 April 1885 by the Caledonian Railway. To the north was Gushetfaulds Carriage Shed and its sidings. Its name was changed to Gushetfaulds on 1 July 1886, although its name sometimes appeared as Glasgow Cathcart Road in the timetable. The station closed on 1 May 1907.

Preceding station	Disused railways	Following station
Terminus	Caledonian Railway; Gordon Street lines	Eglinton Street; Line and station closed
