= 2018 European Artistic Gymnastics Championships =

2018 European Artistic Gymnastics Championships may refer to:

- 2018 European Men's Artistic Gymnastics Championships
- 2018 European Women's Artistic Gymnastics Championships
