= Glasgow Central Railway =

Former railway line in Scotland

Overview
- Headquarters: Glasgow
- Locale: Scotland
- Dates of operation: 10 August 1888–31 May 1889
- Successor: Caledonian Railway

Technical
- Track gauge: 1,435 mm (4 ft 8 1/2 in)

The Glasgow Central Railway was a railway line built in Glasgow, Scotland by the Caledonian Railway, running in tunnel east to west through the city centre. It was opened in stages from 1894 and opened up new journey opportunities for passengers and enabled the Caledonian Railway to access docks and industrial locations on the north bank of the River Clyde. An intensive and popular train service was operated, but the long tunnel sections with frequent steam trains were smoky and heartily disliked.

The network paralleled the North British Railway routes in the area, and after nationalisation of the railways the line declined and was closed in stages from 1959 to 1964.

In 1979 the central part of the route was reopened as an electrically operated passenger railway, the Argyle Line; this was greatly popular and enhanced connecting routes to west and east made this a valuable link through the city once more. The Argyle Line section is in heavy use today, but the other parts remain closed.

== History ==
=== First main lines in Glasgow ===
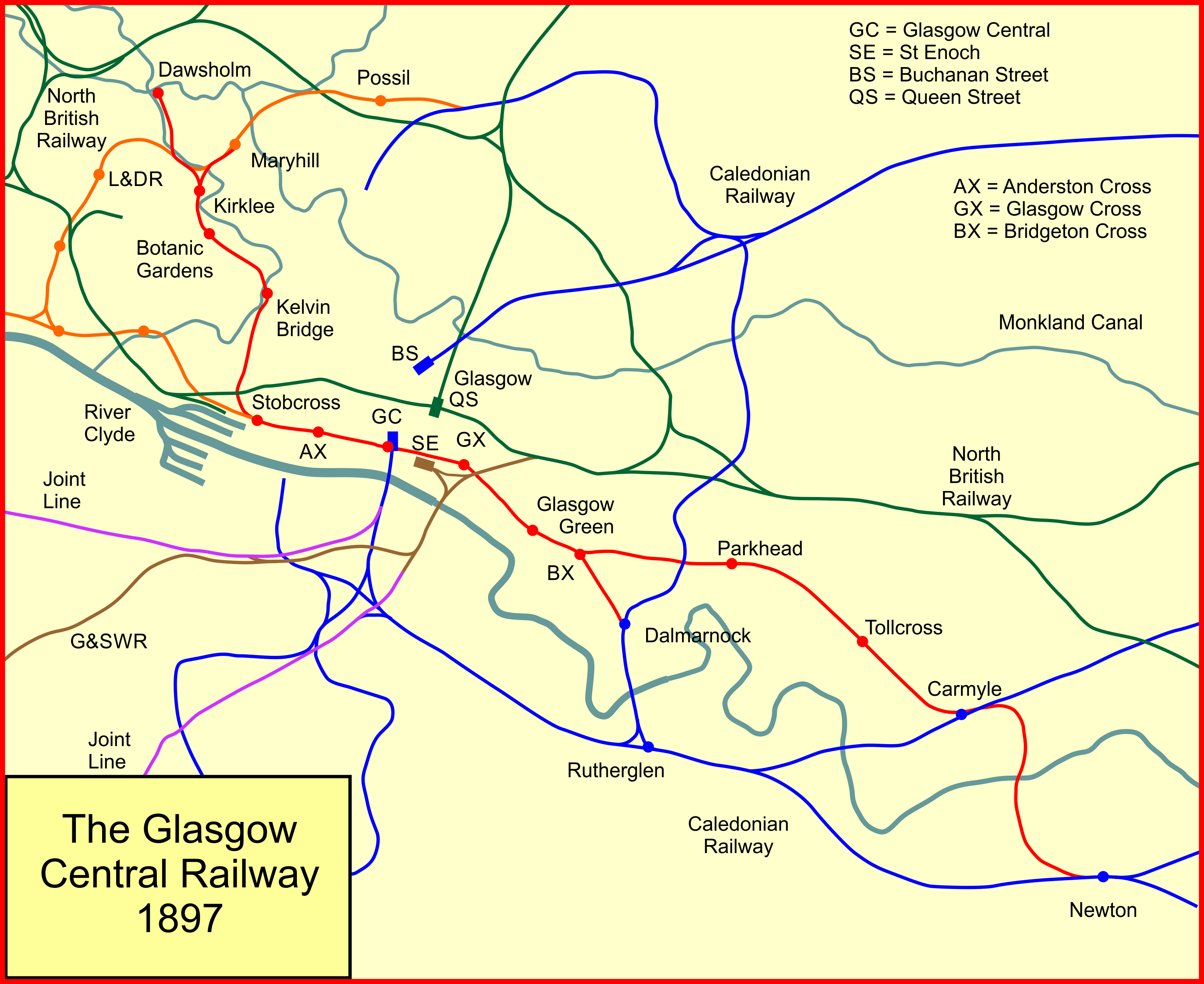
System map of the Glasgow Central Railway

In 1845 the Caledonian Railway was authorised to build its line from Glasgow and Edinburgh to Carlisle. This was a main line railway, with no thought of local travel within the cities. By acquiring interests in other lines, the Caledonian soon had three terminal stations in Glasgow: Buchanan Street, South Side, and Bridge Street. None of these was very convenient to the city centre for passengers, and goods to and from shipping on the River Clyde was carted through the streets.

The Edinburgh and Glasgow Railway (E&GR) terminated at Queen Street, a cramped terminal convenient for the city but with no access to the quays.

The Caledonian set about getting access to the Clyde at Broomielaw by sponsoring the nominally independent General Terminus and Glasgow Harbour Railway which constructed berthing a short distance downstream from Glasgow Bridge on the south side, and built a railway to it from Gushetfaulds (Larkfield Junction). The construction was finished by December 1848 but it connected to the Clydesdale Junction Railway which was only completed the following year. The General Terminus represented considerable progress in bulk handling of minerals, but it was still limited in capacity, as the vessels had to lie alongside the bank, and the improvements to the navigation of the Clyde had not yet been completed. Nonetheless the General Terminus had an effective monopoly of rail-borne export of minerals for many years.

At this period the rapid industrialisation of Glasgow led to an influx of workers into the city centre: Glasgow became "the second city of the British Empire" and the more affluent moved to suburbs: Charing Cross, Hillhead and the Botanic Gardens area. There was still no recognisable suburban railway.

In 1858 the Glasgow, Dumbarton and Helensburgh Railway (GD&HR) opened its line from the E&GR at Cowlairs, on the north-east of Glasgow, looping round to the north and running north of the Clyde to Dumbarton and on to Helensburgh. The circuit round the north of Glasgow was a roundabout route but it succeeded in connecting Dunbartonshire (Note: At the time the common spelling was Dumbartonshire and some railways used that spelling in their titles.) into the railway network. The company was absorbed by the E&GR in 1862 and the E&GR was itself absorbed to form the North British Railway in 1865. Accordingly, the Caledonian was losing out to a bitter competitor.

In 1870 the City of Glasgow Union Railway bridged the Clyde and the so-called "bus trains", frequent services with closely spaced stops, were instituted. The City Union Line was a joint scheme between the NBR and the Glasgow and South Western Railway, another competitor.

=== North Clyde developments ===
From 1872 the Clyde Trustees undertook an ambitious project to build a large dock at Stobcross, on marshland on the north bank downstream. This became the Queen's Dock, and it opened in 1874.

The North British Railway built a connecting line to it, leaving the GD&HR line at Maryhill and running south and then east. It took a wide circuit to reach Stobcross because of contours and housing development. This was the Stobcross Railway. Traffic started on 20 October 1870, and it formed an important goods artery for NBR. The Caledonian Railway were granted running powers to reach the dock from Sighthill, a long and difficult transit over NBR tracks, and the NBR placed every obstacle in the way of the Caledonian.

Next the NBR sponsored another nominally independent company, the Glasgow, Yoker and Clydebank Railway, which left the GD&HR line near Jordanhill and ran to industrial locations, especially shipyards, on the Clyde. It opened in 1882. Finally the Glasgow City and District Railway was promoted, also by the NBR, to build a through east to west sub-surface line connecting the Coatbridge line and the Dumbarton line. It opened in 1886 and although expensive to construct, it was an immediate success. The North British Railway now had a decent suburban network in Glasgow and on the North bank of the Clyde, and the Caledonian had almost nothing.

=== The Glasgow Central Railway ===
Glasgow Central Railway Act 1888
- Act of Parliament
- Parliament of the United Kingdom
- Long title: An Act to authorise the construction of Railways from the Dalmarnock Branch of the Caledonian Railway to Maryhill with Branches to the Railway Depôts at Stobcross, and other Works in connection therewith; and for other purposes.
- Citation: 51 & 52 Vict. c. cxciv

Dates
- Royal assent: 10 August 1888

Text of statute as originally enacted

The Caledonian clearly had to do something, and an independent engineer, Charles Forman, proposed a solution: a Glasgow Central Railway should be built on an east-west axis, connecting Maryhill in the north west of the city with Dalmarnock, on a short branch from Rutherglen on the main line, in the south east. It would run through the city centre south of the NBR line and have station facilities at the Caledonian's Glasgow Central terminal, as well as giving direct access to Stobcross and the Queen's Dock, still an important dock area. The Caledonian thought this was a good idea, and encouraged the development of the scheme. At this time the line that became the Liverpool Overhead Railway was being designed. The solution of building an urban railway over the streets in the central area seemed attractive and relatively cheap, and on that basis the Glasgow Central Railway obtained the Glasgow Central Railway Act 1888 (51 & 52 Vict. c. cxciv) providing authorisation on 10 August 1888.

The railways and road hereinbefore referred to and authorised Description by this Act are:—
- (1.) A railway (in this Act called "Railway No. 1") three miles two furlongs two chains and eighteen yards, or thereabouts, in length, commencing by a junction with the Dalmarnock branch of the Caledonian Railway at a point in the parish of Calton, twenty yards or thereabouts northward from the northern end of the central girder of the northmost span of the viaduct carrying that branch over the River Clyde, and terminating at a point in the barony parish of Glasgow, thirty yards or thereabouts westward from the north-western corner of the buildings at the crossing of Elliott street and Stobcross street;
- (2.) A railway (in this Act called "Railway No. 2") two miles one furlong one chain and fourteen yards, or thereabouts, in length, commencing at the point of termination of Railway No. 1, and terminating at a point in the parish of Govan, two hundred and seventy yards or thereabouts northward from the south-western corner of the southmost house in the terrace of houses known as Kirklee Gardens;
- (3.) A railway (in this Act called "Railway No. 3") four furlongs five chains and nineteen yards, or thereabouts, in length, commencing at the point of termination of Railway No. 2, and terminating at a point in the parish of Maryhill, sixty yards or thereabouts north-westward from the centre of the eastmost span of the aqueduct carrying the Forth and Clyde navigation over the river Kelvin;
- (4.) A railway, wholly in the barony parish of Glasgow (in this Act called " Railway No. 4"), one furlong five chains and twenty yards, or thereabouts, in length, commencing at the point of termination of Railway No. 1, and terminating by a junction with the sidings of the low-level joint depôt of the Caledonian and North British Railway Companies at Stobcross, at a point sixty yards or thereabouts southward from the south-western corner of the brass foundry of Messrs. J. and W. Young, Galbraith street, Stobcross;
- (5.). A railway, wholly in the barony parish of Glasgow (in this Act called "Railway No. 5"), three furlongs one chain and eighteen yards, or thereabouts, in length, commencing by a junction with Railway No. 4, at a point sixty yards or thereabouts westward from the north-western corner at the crossing of Finnieston Street and Stobcross Street, and terminating by a junction with the lines of rails in the Caledonian Railway Company's depôt at Stobcross, at a point three hundred and eighty yards or thereabouts eastward from the centre of the bridge carrying the Stobcross branch of the North British Railway over Sandyford Street;
- (6.) A railway (in this Act called "Railway No. 6"), four furlongs one chain and fourteen yards, or thereabouts, in length, commencing by a junction with Railway No. 2 at a point in the parish of Govan, forty-five yards or thereabouts south-westward from the centre of the footbridge over the River Kelvin, near the Three-Tree-Well, and terminating at a point in the parish of Maryhill, eleven yards or thereabouts south-eastward from the eastmost corner of the boundary wall of Maryhill barracks.
— Section 6, Glasgow Central Railway Act 1888 (51 & 52 Vict. c. cxciv)

Business interests and public opinion in Glasgow only now realised what was being proposed, and a considerable outcry; so vehement was it that the Caledonian reconsidered, and a further act of Parliament was sought and obtained as the Caledonian Railway Act 1889 (52 & 53 Vict. c. xii) the following year, altering the plan to a sub-surface line like the NBR line. Getting the act of Parliament was one thing, but the detailed engineering of a sub-surface railway through the centre of the city, with large buildings that could not be disturbed, was daunting. The Caledonian decided to take the work into its own hands, still employing the engineering firm that conceived the scheme, and the company was absorbed on 31 May 1890. No physical work had started at that time.

Notwithstanding the difficulties, the idea of the line was so attractive that a branch was proposed, running from Bridgeton Cross via Tollcross to Carmyle (on the Caledonian's Rutherglen and Coatbridge line and on to Newton on the main line. This extension, often informally referred to as the Tollcross line, was authorised by the Caledonian Railway (Additional Powers) Act 1890 (53 & 54 Vict. c. cxxxi) on 25 July 1890.

The first sod was cut on 11 June 1890 by Master J. B. Montgomerie Fleming, son of J. B. Fleming of Kelvinside. Construction was prodigiously difficult: five out of seven miles were underground; and the city authorities were now alerted to the need to demand proper respect for the aesthetics of the city streets, and they paid close attention to the plans and practices of the company. The new Botanic Gardens was of especial architectural interest as a result. The Caledonian Railway issued £950,000 of special stock to fund the construction.

=== Opening ===
In the final stages of construction the section from Maryhill to Stobcross opened to mineral traffic (to Queens Dock) on 26 November 1894. (The Lanarkshire and Dumbartonshire opened from Maryhill to Balornock Junction on the same day.) Passenger trains started to run from Rutherglen to Glasgow Cross on 1 November 1895, and the entire line opened to all traffic on 10 August 1896. 130 trains passed through the line each way. Central Station had two island platforms, and four through tracks. The Tollcross section opened throughout on 1 February 1897.

Goods traffic was hugely important at the time, and was considerably simplified: instead of using running powers over the NBR from Sighthill to Stobcross, the trains could now run through the Central line, or alternatively via the Possil line of the L&DR.

=== Early electrification proposals ===
Except at the extremities, the line ran through continuous tunnels and was operated by steam trains. (Some locomotives were fitted with condensing equipment.) 130 passenger trains ran each way daily, and heavy mineral traffic to Stobcross used the route. The ventilation and lighting of the subsurface stations were poor, and the environment attracted much criticism. At this time technical development suggested that electric traction might be feasible. The Central London Railway was being constructed on that system (it opened in 1900) and of course street tramcars had been using electricity, although not without problems at first.

The Caledonian Railway decided to electrify the line, and electrification of the Glasgow Central Railway, the Tollcross line, and other railways was authorised by the Caledonian Railway Act 1898 (61 & 62 Vict. c. clxxxviii) on 2 August 1898. As well as the immaturity of the technology there were some practical problems, chiefly the heavy mineral traffic which would have required an engine change on approaching the line and again at Stobcross. Having secured the powers, the Caledonian did not proceed with the idea, and the powers lapsed.

=== Connections at the west end ===
The eastern end of the proposed railway fed into the Caledonian network towards Hamilton, Motherwell and Coatbridge. At the western end, it fed to the Queen's Dock at Stobcross, and to the important suburb at Maryhill, and also to nearby Dawsholm. Dawsholm was almost entirely industrial; for many years there had been an important textile printing works there and a large corporation gasworks had been established there in 1871 and much extended later. Much supplementary industry, including a chemical works, was being established there.

Dawsholm only lasted until 1908 as a passenger station, but it developed in its industrial significance, and the Caledonian built a six-road engine shed there which serviced most of the Central Railway's traction needs.

Concurrently with the construction of the Glasgow Central Railway, the Caledonian was encouraging the promotion and building of the Lanarkshire and Dumbartonshire Railway. (The company used the spelling Dumbartonshire, although later usage for the county adopted a spelling with the letter "n".)

This was to link Balloch and Dumbarton with the north shore of the River Clyde to the Central line. The connection was at Stobcross, and also to a new through station at Maryhill continuing on to Possil and a junction at Balornock on the Caledonian main line from Buchanan Street. The route taken by the L&DR incorporated a large area of newly established heavy industry on North Clydeside and served rapidly developing residential areas.

The Lanarkshire and Dumbartonshire line opened progressively in the years 1894 to 1896, and with the Central line was operated as an integral part of the Caledonian Railway: at last the Caledonian had secured a suburban network in the north and west of Glasgow.

=== Post-war decline ===
From the outset, the Central Railway was found to be unattractive for passengers; the smoky atmosphere, and the dirty condition of the station and the trains were constantly commented upon. Street tramcars by contrast were frequent, clean, and had stops close to city destinations that the railway could not always match. The railways were nationalised in 1948, and the duplication of lines for passengers and goods was a disadvantage, now that competition was irrelevant. Some individual stations had already been closed. The line was closed to passengers between Maryhill and Stobcross on 2 November 1959, although goods and mineral traffic continued from the Possil line via Maryhill to the Queen's Dock until 14 August 1960; after that date a service to Kelvinbridge continued until 6 July 1964.

The NBR route to Helensburgh was selected for modernisation, and the route was electrified in 1960, causing a revolution in passenger convenience. This only exaggerated the negative perception of the Central Railway, and on 5 October 1964 the Central Railway network was closed to passenger traffic. The Possil line lost its goods traffic as well, as it simply paralleled the NBR route. A short section serving Tollcross from Carmyle was the only remnant, for goods trains, lasting until 4 April 1966.

=== Argyle Line ===
For some years, therefore, the line lay unused. Then in the 1970s the Glasgow political mood shifted in favour of rail transport. The Greater Glasgow Passenger Transport Authority decided to fund reopening of part of the Central Railway, as a passenger link line from a junction near Partick on the NBR electric line to Rutherglen. Financial authority was given in 1974, and on 1 November 1979 the new Argyle Line, as it was named, was opened. Public services started on 5 November 1979. The diverging junction at Partick leading to the Argyle Line was made a grade-separated junction: eastbound trains dived under the NBR line and converged with the westbound line at Stobcross, renamed Finnieston (and later renamed Exhibition Centre.)

A new station was provided at Argyle Street; the platforms are below the centre of the street, and at the time it had not been pedestrianised. Accordingly, the access from the island platform descends to cross under the track, before rising to a street level building at the side of the street.

The Argyle line was a considerable success, and trains ran through from the Hamilton Circle and from Lanark, although the Lanark train was re-diverted to its previous route from Rutherglen to Glasgow Central high level station in 2013. There is a frequency of typically eight trains an hour through the line each way, operated by ScotRail.

== Signalling ==
The signalling in the long and difficult tunnel section was conventional, using the Tyers Lock and Block system, but the signals themselves had no semaphore arms; instead they had a rising spectacle plate that exhibited the usual night time oil lamp colours to drivers. This subjected the Caledonian and its successor railway to criticism, as the smoky tunnel conditions, coupled with commonplace bunker-first running, led to difficulty for drivers. The intensive train service and the occasional failure of the lock and block system seems to have encouraged signalmen to adopt irregular practices to deal with the failures. The purpose of the lock and block system is to prevent signalmen from accepting a train until a preceding train has passed and the signals restored to danger. Collisions resulted from the irregular practice when a train failed in section and signalmen assumed that it had passed unnoticed, and irregularly released the system.

A remarkable innovation with a form of power signalling was installed at Stobcross. The station was in a very cramped site already heavily built up. At the east end, where the line emerged from the tunnel section, there was a sharp curve and a signal box had to be located there: "Stobcross East". At the location where the signal box had to be located to allow the signalman to observe the passage and location of trains, there was inadequate space for a conventional box. The solution adopted was to build a master-and-slave system: a staffed signal box was placed where visibility of trains was convenient, and a dependent box with full interlocking was placed in a convenient space, but where visibility was poor. The latter box was normally unstaffed, and it was operated by hydraulic power from the staffed box, which contained the block instruments.

The innovation was not a success, and in 1909 it was replaced by a conventional signalbox arrangement.

Some of the signals in the tunnel section were disc signals and some semaphore signals at stations between the tunnels had foreshortened arms.

In 1956 modern colour light signalling was installed on the line, controlled from Stobcross and Bridgeton, with track circuit control in between. This enabled the closure of boxes at Dalmarnock, Glasgow Green, Glasgow Cross, Glasgow Central, Anderston Cross and Partick Central No.2. Each signal had an electric detonator placer.

== Accidents ==
The special conditions of intensive working in the tunnel sections made the task difficult. Signalmen and drivers were under pressure to work the heavy train service efficiently, in the most challenging of conditions.

To avoid stopping passenger trains in tunnel sections, a relaxation of the rules was in force permitting the clearance of the home signal (protecting entry to a station area) without bringing the train quite or nearly to a stand. The consequence of this was that drivers rarely encountered any home signal at danger, and some were accustomed to fail to look out for it. Many of the signals were of miniature arm or disc type, and the tunnel signals were oil lamps of inconsistent performance. Bunker-first or tender first running and the smoky tunnel conditions made signal spotting difficult. Out of sequence running and the heavy running of special goods and excursion trains added to the signalmen's load.

A rear-end collision took place near Anderston Cross in 1900. A signalman irregularly used a cancelling key, which negated the controls of the lock-and-block system, and he allowed a second train into the section.

In 1939 a side-swiping collision took place at Stobcross. Two trains had been simultaneously accepted up to the converging junction from the west; this was improper as there was no overlap available. One of the trains overran the home signal which was at danger.

In 1949 a rear-end collision took place at Glasgow Cross; a passenger train driven by an experienced driver ran through several stop signals standing at danger; low standards of attention to signalling equipment maintenance were exposed, and it was clear that drivers were used to running through the line without being able to see many of the signals.

In 1951 a rear-end collision took place at Stobcross; a signalman worked the block instruments irregularly, and there were two wrong-side defects in the lock and block system that enabled this.

In 1952 a rear-end collision took place at Bridgeton Cross; a train stalled in the section and a signalman thought the train had passed and that the Lock-and-Block apparatus had failed; he improperly released the lock and signalled a following train through.

== Topography ==
=== Original line ===
For much of its route the line was in a shallow cut-and-cover tunnel, and gradients were imposed by the road levels. Glasgow Central station was in a dip to enable the footbridge between platforms to cross the line, below the main station above.

Location list:

==== Dawsholm branch ====
- Dawsholm; opened 1 October 1896; closed 1 May 1908;
- Kirklee Junction;

==== Main line ====
- Maryhill; opened 10 August 1896; renamed Maryhill Central 1952; closed 5 October 1964;
- Kirklee Junction; see above;
- Kirklee; opened 10 August 1896; closed 1 January 1917; reopened 2 June 1919; closed 1 May 1939;
- Botanic Gardens; opened 10 August 1896; closed 1 January 1917; reopened 2 June 1919; closed 6 February 1939;
- Kelvin Bridge; opened 10 August 1896; closed 1 January 1917; reopened 2 June 1919; closed 4 August 1952;
- Stobcross; opened 1 May 1896; closed 3 August 1959;
- Anderston Cross; opened 10 August 1896; closed 3 August 1959;
- Glasgow Central; opened 10 August 1896; closed 5 October 1964;
- Glasgow Cross; opened 1 November 1895; closed 5 October 1964;
- Glasgow Green; opened 1 November 1895; closed 1 January 1917; reopened 2 June 1919; closed 2 November 1953;
- Bridgeton Cross; opened 1 November 1895; closed 5 October 1964;
- Dalmarnock; opened 1 November 1895; closed 5 October 1964.

==== Tollcross line ====
- Bridgeton Cross; see above;
- Parkhead; opened 23 November 1870; renamed Parkhead Stadium 1952; closed 5 October 1964;
- Tollcross; opened 1 February 1897; closed 5 October 1964;
- Carmyle; station on Rutherglen and Coatbridge line; closed 5 October 1964;
- Carmyle Junction;
- Newton; station on main line.

The line continued to Rutherglen using the London Road branch.

=== 1979 line ===
- Partick Junction; on Queen Street line;
- Finnieston; renamed Exhibition Centre 1986;
- Anderston;
- Glasgow Central;
- Argyle Street;
- Bridgeton;
- Dalmarnock;
- Rutherglen.

== Images ==
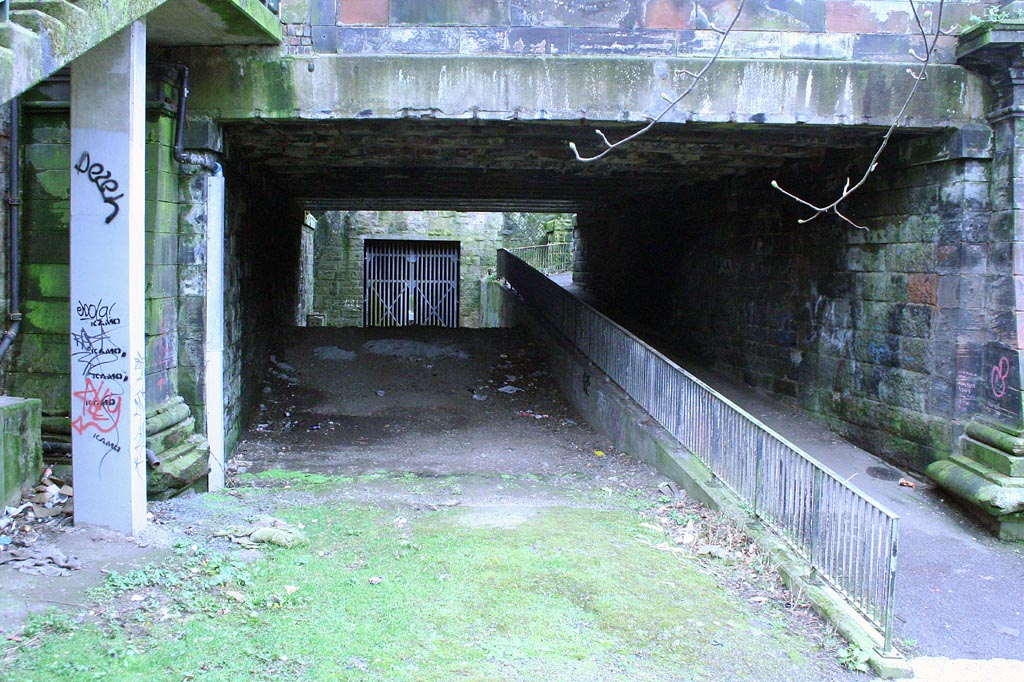
Entrance to the tunnel from Kelvinbridge towards Stobcross in March 2007

The remains of Kelvinbridge station in March 2007

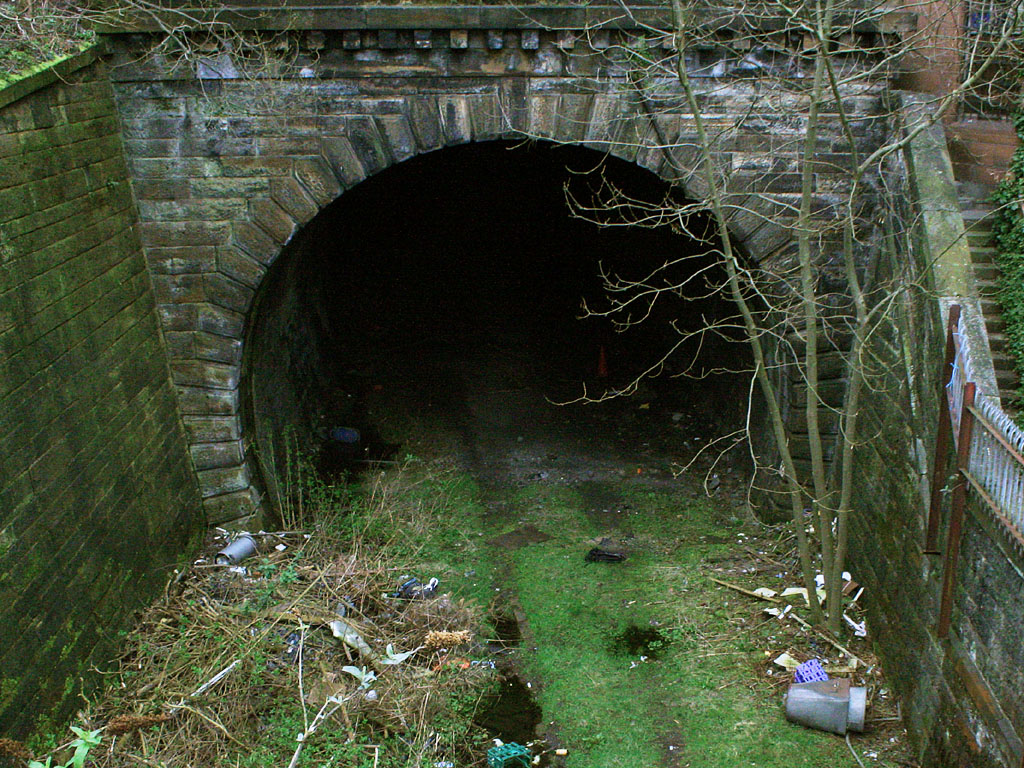
Entrance to the tunnel from Kelvinbridge towards Botanic Gardens in March 2007

Kirklee looking north, showing the remaining platforms. The flats in the background stand on the site of the station buildings, October 2007.

== Sources ==
- Awdry, Christopher (1990). Encyclopaedia of British Railway Companies. Sparkford: Patrick Stephens Ltd. ISBN 1-8526-0049-7. OCLC 19514063. CN 8983.
- Butt, R. V. J. (October 1995). The Directory of Railway Stations: details every public and private passenger station, halt, platform and stopping place, past and present (1st ed.). Sparkford: Patrick Stephens Ltd. ISBN 978-1-85260-508-7. OCLC 60251199. OL 11956311M.
- Jowett, Alan (March 1989). Jowett's Railway Atlas of Great Britain and Ireland: From Pre-Grouping to the Present Day (1st ed.). Sparkford: Patrick Stephens Ltd. ISBN 978-1-85260-086-0. OCLC 22311137.
