= Charing Cross station =

Charing Cross station may refer to:

In London, England:

- Charing Cross railway station
- Charing Cross tube station (on the London Underground)
  - Embankment tube station was previously named Charing Cross

In Glasgow, Scotland:

- Charing Cross (Glasgow) railway station
