= Woodlands, Glasgow =

Coordinates: 55.8715°N 4.2774°W

Woodlands: Scots: Widlaunds
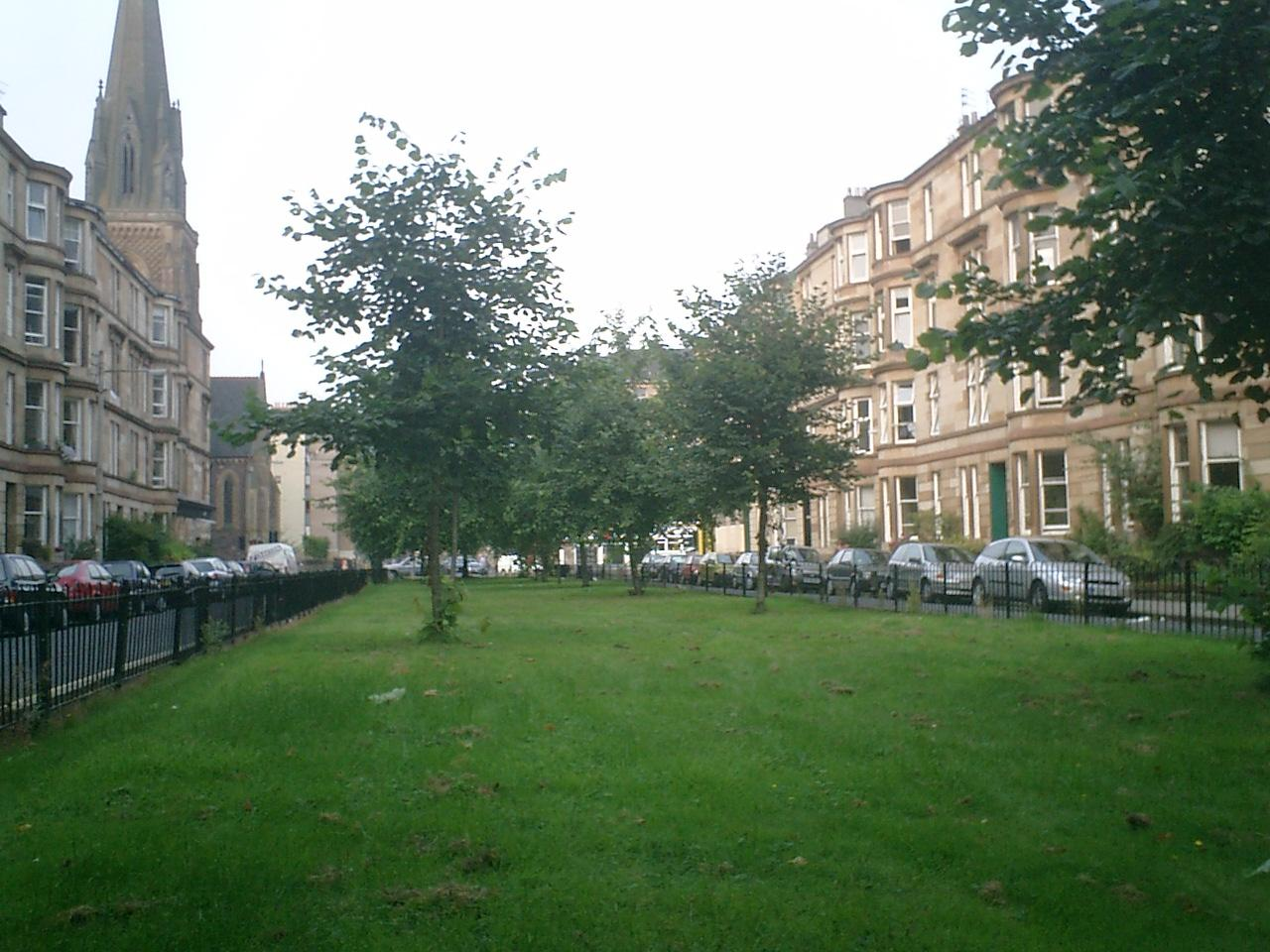
- Woodlands Drive

- Location within Glasgow
- OS grid reference: NS576666
- Council area: Glasgow City Council
- Lieutenancy area: Glasgow
- Country: Scotland
- Sovereign state: United Kingdom
- Post town: GLASGOW
- Postcode district: G3, G4
- Dialling code: 0141
- Police: Scotland
- Fire: Scottish
- Ambulance: Scottish
- UK Parliament: Glasgow North
- Scottish Parliament: Glasgow Kelvin

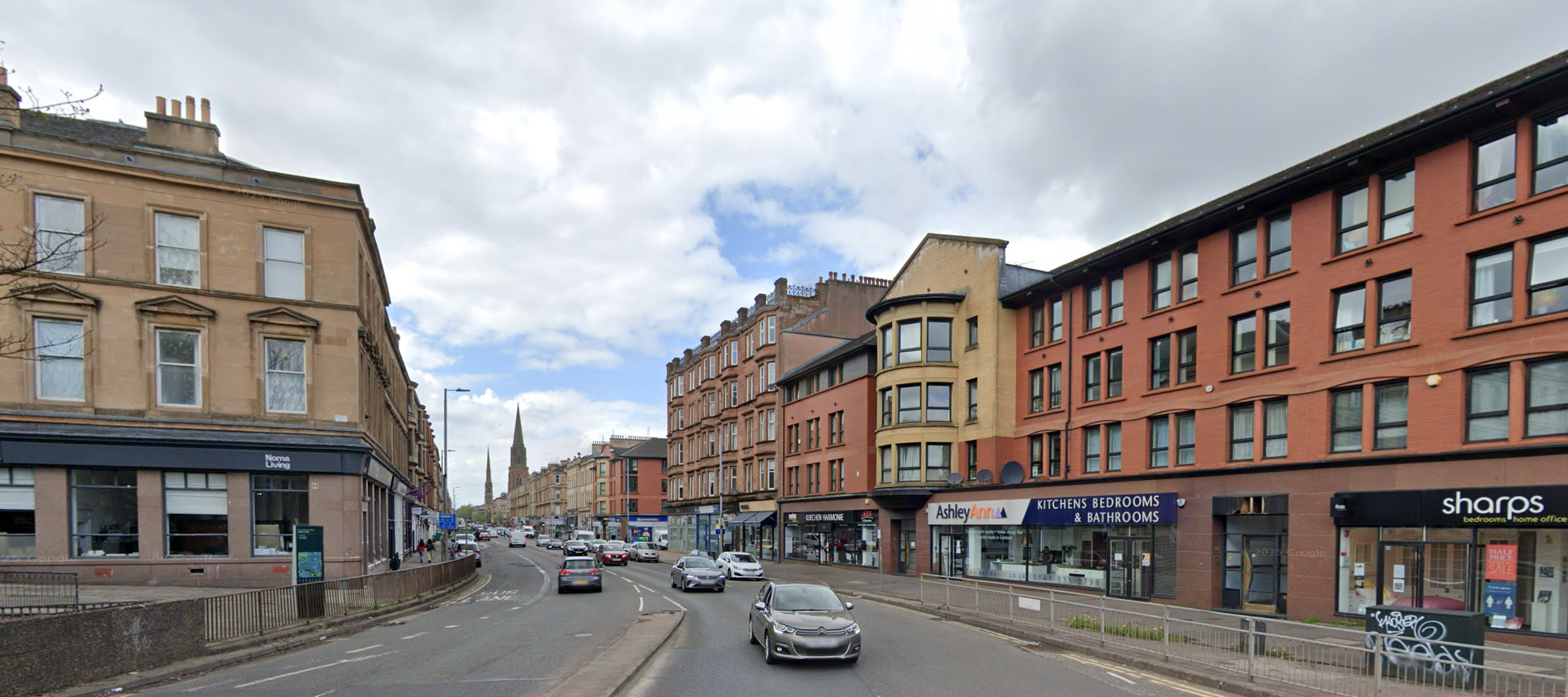
St George’s cross woodlands Glasgow

Woodlands is an area of Glasgow, Scotland. Situated on the north-west edge of the city centre, Woodlands is located within Glasgow's fashionable West End, east of Hillhead, south of Woodside, north of the Park District and Kelvingrove Park, and west of Charing Cross and Garnethill.

== History ==
Woodlands has a substantial population of residents of Pakistani and Indian heritage, as well as a large number of students. The area is in the vicinity of the University of Glasgow and Glasgow School of Art. The housing stock mostly consists of 19th century terraces, townhouses, and blonde and red sandstone tenement housing, with modern redevelopment which is also predominantly in the tenement style.

The area of flat land on the east bank of the River Kelvin was used as an industrial area. From at least the early 1600s, the site was the location of a watermill which processed grain. In 1790, William Gillespie constructed Glasgow's first and only water driven cotton mill, with bleach and print fields also located in the vicinity. As part of the Blythswood Estate, Woodlands was officially incorporated into the city of Glasgow in 1830.

In 2021, Woodlands was the location of the Murder of Esther Brown.

== Points of interest ==
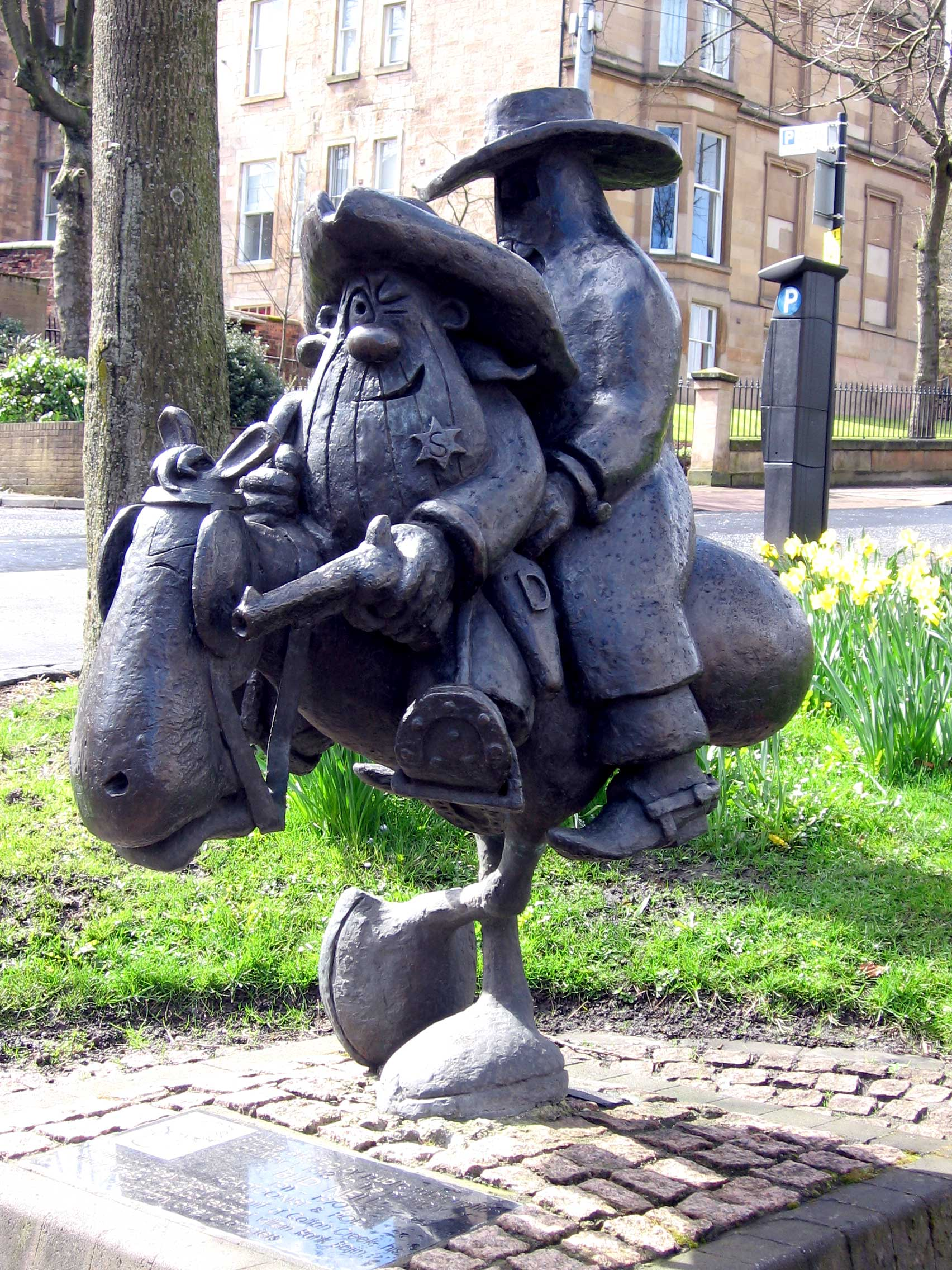
Lobey Dosser

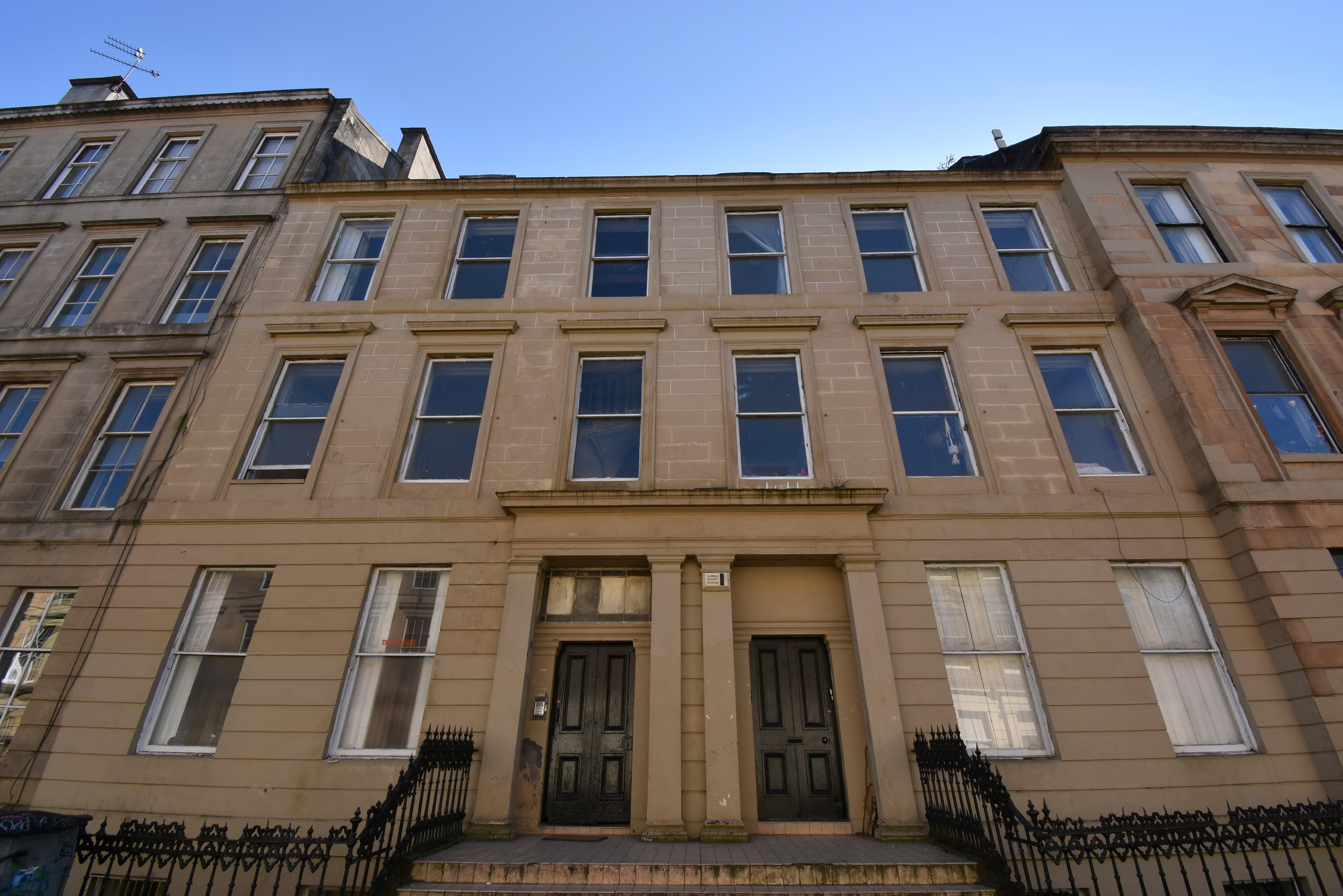
Marion Gilchrist's home at 49 West Princes Street. 113 years later pensioner Esther Brown was murdered in the same terrace.

Woodlands is home to the Arlington Baths Club. The club is located on Arlington Street. Burnbank Park, which was situated on what is now Barrington Drive, was the home of the Caledonian Cricket Club, and was the home ground of Rangers F.C. from September 1875 to March 1876.

49 West Princes Street was the home of Marion Gilchrist, the victim in the famous Oscar Slater case.

There is a statue erected in the memory of Bud Neill on the corner of Woodlands Road and Woodlands Gate.

== Public transport ==
Public transport includes Kelvinbridge and St George's Cross Subway stations, located respectively at the western and eastern extremes of the district, as well as numerous bus routes along Great Western and Woodlands Roads.
