= Peter Melvin =

English architect

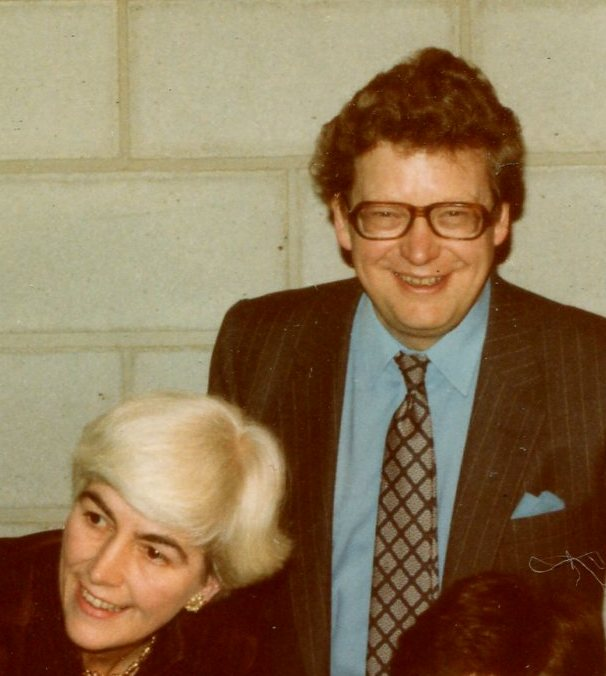
- Muriel and Peter Melvin in 1982
- Born: 19 September 1933; Harrow, Middlesex, England
- Died: 17 November 2009 (aged 76); Berkhamsted, Hertfordshire, England
- Occupation: Architect

Peter Anthony Paul Melvin, RIBA (19 September 1933 – 17 November 2009), was an English architect. His work over a period of fifty years evolved from large-scale Brutalist projects to small-scale made-to-measure designs. He was a vice-president for education at the Royal Institute of British Architects.

== Biography ==
Peter Melvin was born in Harrow in the London Borough of Harrow, the only child of Charles George Thomas and Elsie Melvin. He attended St Marylebone Grammar School in the City of Westminster and studied architecture part-time at the Regent Street Polytechnic (now University of Westminster). Peter wanted to become an architect from the age of 11. During his studies he played jazz piano in the evenings to earn his keep. After finishing his studies he worked at Frederick Gibberd's office in London.

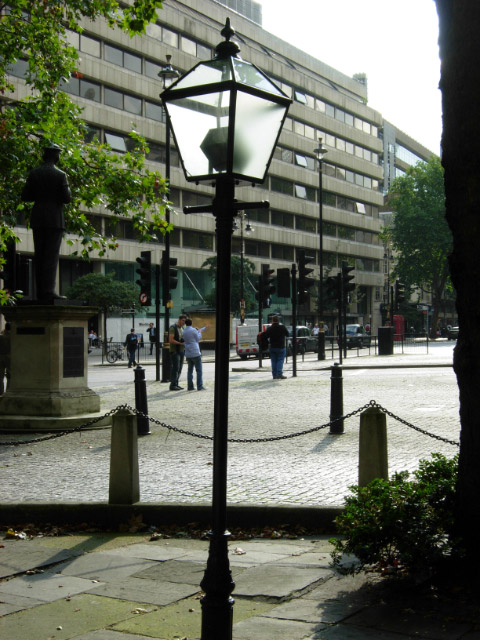
Office building, Strand

In the early 1960s Melvin was a partner with Arthur Swift & Partners, a London-based firm with offices in Glasgow and Dublin. One of the buildings he worked on during this period was St Andrew House in Glasgow (1961–64), designed as a Brutalist office tower, now a refurbished, Modernist hotel. Another building from this period is the large office block on London's Strand / Arundel Street, for which Melvin as chief architect conducted negotiations with a shopkeeper who refused to move - a story that made it to the papers.

In 1960, he married Muriel Faure, also an architect, who trained at Kingston Art College. The couple had three children. In 1964 Melvin set up private practice supported by his wife Muriel. A year later he left Arthur Swift & Partners. Melvin was joined shortly after by one of his contemporaries from the Regent Street Polytechnic, Clifford Lansley, forming the company Melvin & Lansley. They designed housing estates in Hertfordshire for the local authority and went on to design civic centres, shopping blocks, schools, churches and private homes. Percy Mark, whom they knew from the poly joined them as a partner some years later and the firm changed its name to Melvin Lansley and Mark (in 1994 Atelier MLM).

Melvin had two spells as vice-president for education at the Royal Institute of British Architects, the first in the 1970s when he traveled to Egypt and Russia to inspect schools of architecture for RIBA accreditation, and again in the 1980s and 1990s when he traveled to South Africa and South America. His book Architecture in South Africa since 1945 remained unfinished at his death at 76. Peter Melvin died in his home in Berkhamsted in 2009, one year after his wife Muriel.

The architectural firm continues as Atelier Architecture + Design, directed by Stephen Melvin, Peter and Muriel's youngest son. In 2011 the Royal Institute of British Architects organized the Peter and Muriel Melvin Debates, a series of debates about architecture in honour of the late architects.

== Selection of works (incomplete) ==
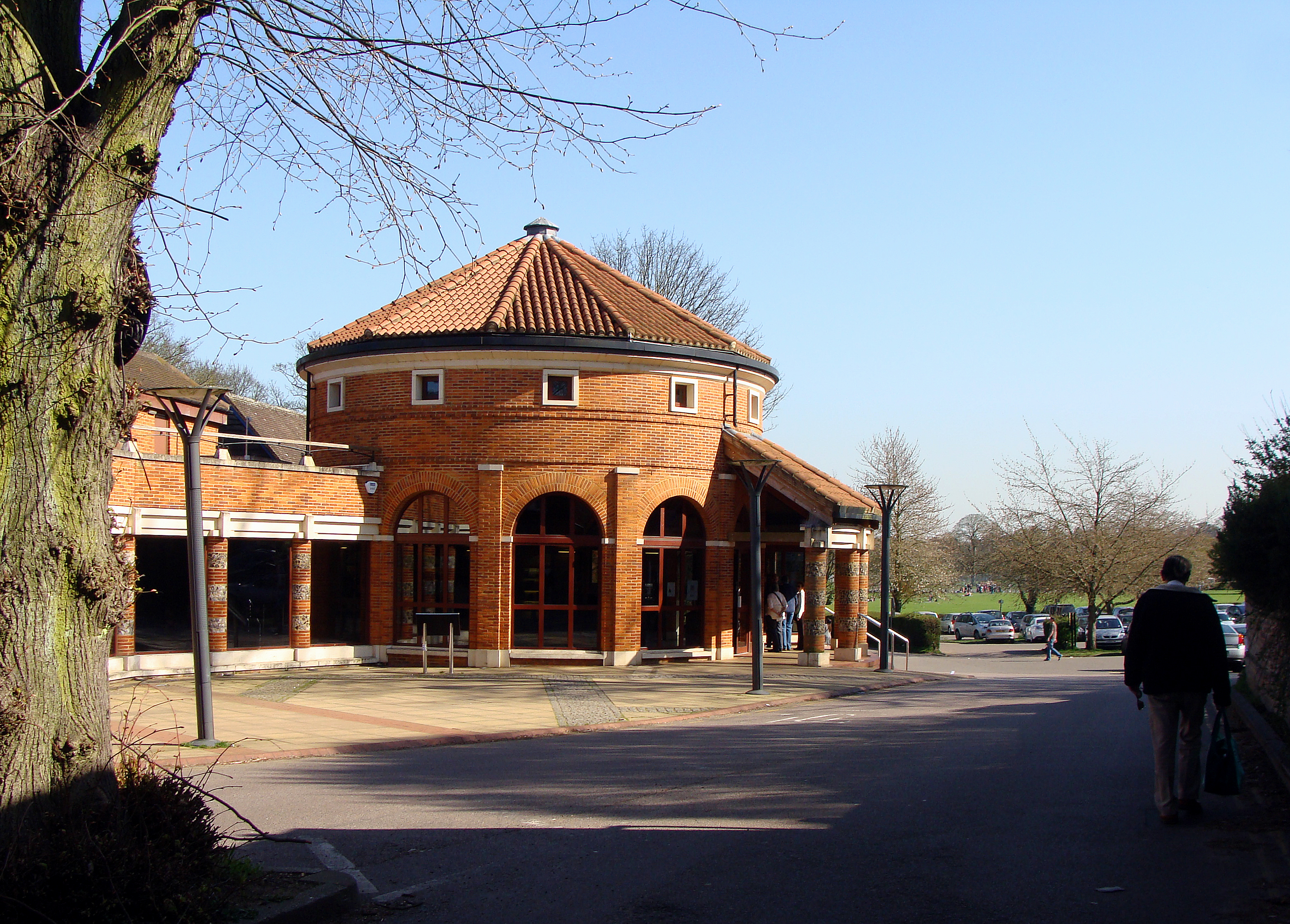
Verulamium Museum, St Albans

- 1957: Shopping development, Scott Street, Perth, Scotland (unbuilt?)
- 1961: St Andrew House, Sauchiehall Street, Glasgow
- early 1960s?: Hotel, Edinburgh
- 1972: Private house, New Road, Welwyn, Hertfordshire (published in: Architectural Review, Pevsner Architectural Guides: Buildings of England – Hertfordshire, Architecture SA (1981), RIBA Design Award Merit)
- 1974: New Vicarage, Tring (published in: Pevsner Architectural Guides: Buildings of England - Hertfordshire (1977), p. 368; and McKean's Architectural Guide to Cambridge and East Anglia Paperback (1982), p. 177)
- 1975: Parish Hall, Tring (published in: Architects' Journal, RIBA Bronze Medal, Civic Trust Award)
- 1975: Renovation Court House, Berkhamsted
- 1977: Church of the Resurrection, Grovehill Church & Community Centre (Church of England, Roman Catholic and Baptist congregations), Hemel Hempstead
- 1970s?: Dacorum District Council buildings (Dacorum Borough Council), Hemel Hempstead (published in RIBA Journal; Civic Trust Commendation)
- 1983: Residential development Downhead Park, Milton Keynes
- Verulamium Museum extension, St Albans (Civic Trust Commendation)
- Aldbury Vicarage
- Aldbury Parish Hall, extension to the 14th-century village church
- HM Prison Preston (extension)
- HM Prison Chelmsford (boiler house)
- HM Prison Spring Hill, Grendon Underwood (gate lodge and visiting accommodation)
- Community Centre, Baldock
- Watermill Hotel, Hemel Hempstead
