= North Street, Glasgow =

Street in Glasgow, Scotland

North Street is a street in the city of Glasgow, Scotland. The street was formerly known as Lang Road.

The street, which is part of the city centre one-way system and carries only northbound traffic, runs parallel to the M8 motorway, on the western side of its below-ground-level carriageways, running from Anderston and the Clydeside Expressway (A814 road) to Charing Cross where there is a major junction. There are two railway stations nearby: Charing Cross Station on the North Clyde Line is across the M8 at the northern end of Newton Street which runs parallel to North Street and carries southbound traffic; Anderston Station on the Argyle Line is at the southern end of the Newton Street.

The front entrance to the Mitchell Library is on North Street.
