= St Andrew House =

Coordinates: 55.86451°N 4.25441°W

St. Andrew House
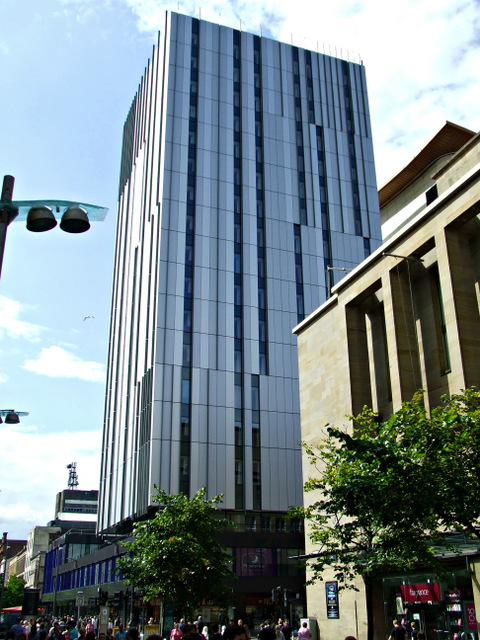
- St Andrew House in 2013 as a Premier Inn hotel
- Interactive map of the St. Andrew House area

General information
- Status: Completed
- Type: Offices (1964–2008); Hotel (2012–present)
- Architectural style: Brutalist (original); Modernist (refurbished)
- Location: 141 West Nile Street, Glasgow, Scotland
- Construction started: 1961
- Completed: 1964
- Renovated: 2011

Height
- Roof: 71 metres (233 ft)
- Top floor: 18

Technical details
- Structural system: Reinforced Concrete
- Floor count: 17 (15 + additional shopping levels + basement)
- Lifts/elevators: 3

Design and construction
- Architects: Arthur Swift & Partners

Renovating team
- Architect: Ryder Architecture

St Andrew House (now styled as the Premier Inn Glasgow Buchanan Galleries) is a prominent 18–storey high rise building situated on West Nile Street in the city of Glasgow, Scotland. The 71-metre (233 ft) building was completed and opened in 1964 as an office building, however, it was purchased by Premier Inn hotel chain owners Whitebread Hotels in 2008. Work commenced to refurbish the building in 2010 to turn the vacant office space into a budget hotel. The building reopened as a Premier Inn, named Premier Inn Glasgow Buchanan Galleries, in October 2012.

At 71 metres (233 ft), St Andrew House is currently the 15th tallest building in Glasgow, behind the 73 m (240 ft) Glasgow City Chambers and ahead of Hilton Glasgow at 70 m (230 ft).

== History ==
=== Office building: 1964–2010 ===
St Andrew House was constructed between 1962-1964, on the former site of the Lyric Theatre (which was destroyed by fire in 1953 and demolished in 1959) on the corner of West Nile Street and Sauchiehall Street. The building was one of the first high rise buildings in the city when it was constructed in the 1960s, and originally opened as a 2,500 m^{2} (27,000 sq ft) mixed-use tower block which contained fifteen floors of office space situated above a two-storey podium of commercial and retail units, and has been a prominent landmark on the eastern end of the city's Sauchiehall Street since the mid-1960s when it was completed. It was one of the first post-war high rise buildings in the city centre. It was designed by architecture firm Arthur Swift & Partners, and was regarded as "state of the art" when it opened in 1964. The building originally featured high speed Otis "Autotronic" lifts (also used in nearby Alec House - a similar office block which was built around the same time. The system used an electromechanical computer to predict the elevator demand at different times of the day.

For much of its existence the building was used as offices, but since the development of newer 'Grade A' office space in the city's new financial district, its owners struggled to find tenants, the building was sold in 2010 for conversion into a hotel – the long leases on the street level shop units preventing demolition.

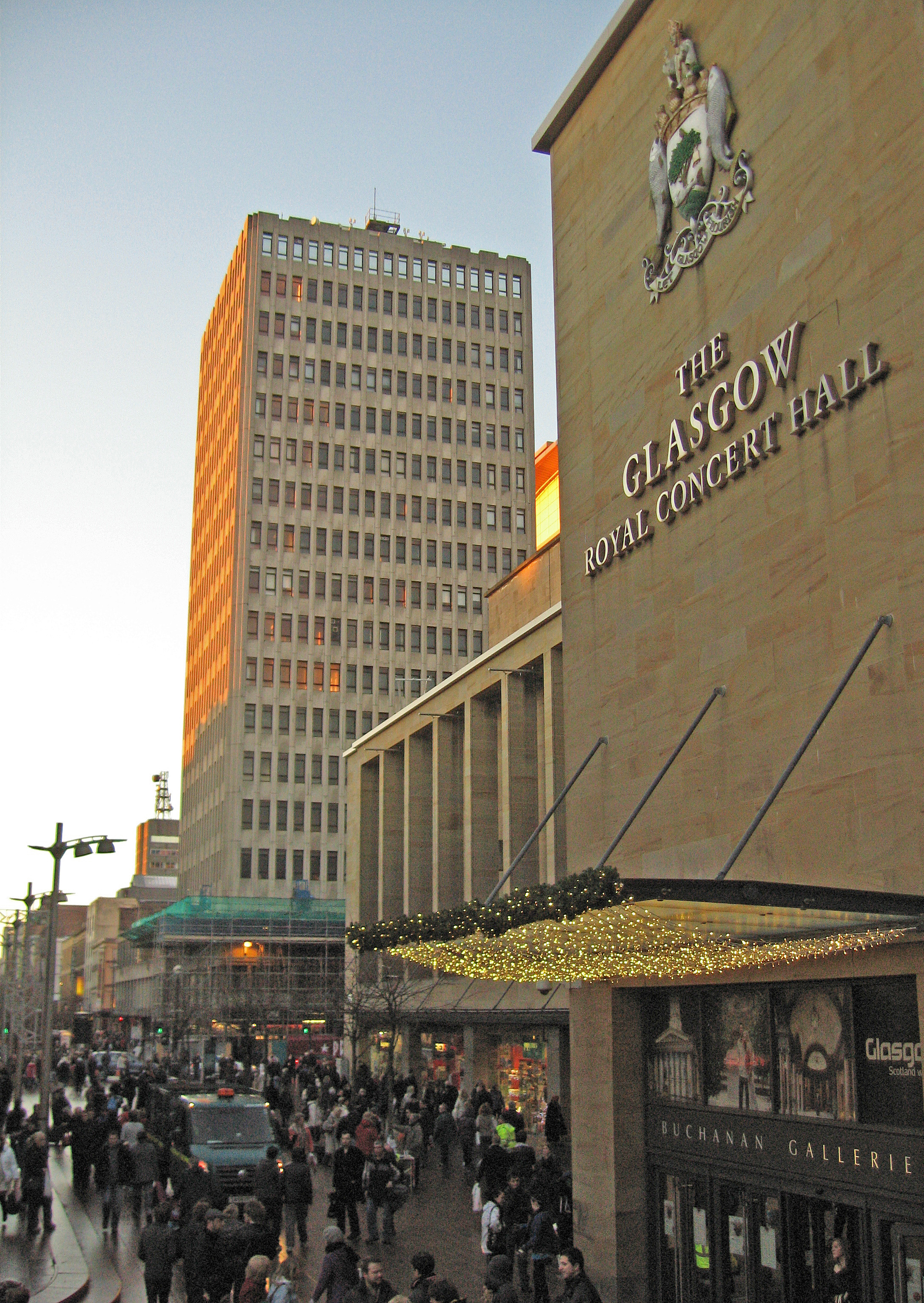
St Andrew House in its original form, showing the concrete curtain wall

=== Hotel: 2012–present ===
Whitebread Hotels, the owner of Premier Inn, purchased the derelict office block in 2008, and in 2010, it was announced that the hotel chain Premier Inn had acquired the tower and planned to convert it into a 210-bedroom hotel, in a similar manner to Elmbank Gardens in nearby Charing Cross – another example of a concrete high-rise office building to be so converted. The remodelling of the building was designed by Ryder Architecture, with Mansell Construction appointed as the main contractor, whilst Charles Henshaw & Sons were appointed as Installers. Because the central area of Glasgow is built on an extremely steep drumlin, on which St. Andrew House is built near the summit, the curiosity arises that the rooms on the 18th floor of the building, are in fact the highest hotel rooms in Glasgow, higher than the luxury suites on the 20th Floor of the Glasgow Hilton in Anderston.

In October 2010, Mansell were awarded the contract to convert the building from an office block into a hotel. Work began that same month, with the work scheduled for an August 2012 completion. The project ran two months over schedule, and the completed renovation project opened officially on 1 October 2012.

=== Renovations ===
Devolvements surrounding the tower, including the construction of both the Glasgow Royal Concert Hall and Buchanan Galleries were said to have "exaggerated its outdated appearance". The building underwent renovation in 2011 estimated at £27.5 million, featuring new LED curtain walling. The project involved stripping the podium of the building, which remained occupied during the renovation, with the podium now serving as the hotel's reception and restaurant. The 15 stories above the podium were stripped back to their original reinforced concrete structure, and were refurbished and underwent a processing of recladding with the Kawneer glazing system. The new curtain walling is credited as "helping to visually soften what was a utilitarian structure, and connection between the podium and tower has been achieved through the use of irregular strips of recessed windows which alternate with external LED lighting helping to create that clear vertical emphasis".

The refurbishment of the building was part of a £42 million investment by Premier Inn to construct nine new hotels. St Andrew House was the largest and most expensive and brings the number of such hotels in Glasgow to four. The programme of refurbishment at the tower was the first office-block-to-hotel conversion project to occur in Scotland and to benefit from the Business Premises Renovation Allowances Scheme.

== Location ==
The top floors of the building are the tallest hotel rooms in Glasgow, higher than the luxury suites situated on the top floors of the Hilton Glasgow hotel.

== See also ==
- List of tallest buildings and structures in Glasgow
