= St George's Cross, Glasgow =

Road Junction in Glasgow, Scotland

Coordinates: 55°52′3″N 4°16′16.1″W

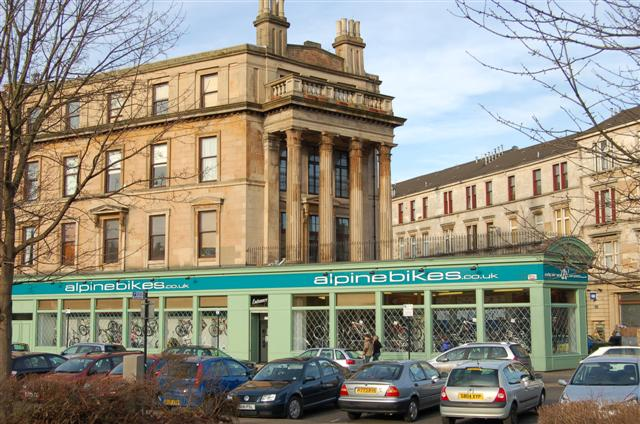
St George's Cross buildings.

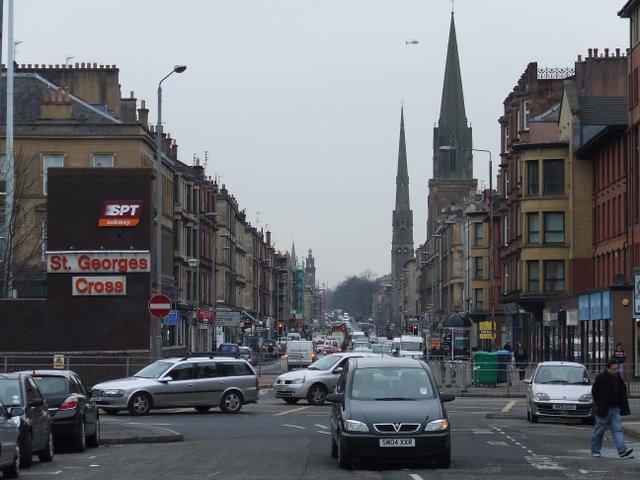
View along Great Western Road from St George's Cross, showing the subway station.

St George's Cross is a road junction in the Woodside area of Glasgow, Scotland. Previously a major intersection for traffic approaching the central areas of the city from its north-western parts, two of the roads forming the junction, Great Western Road and Maryhill Road, were bypassed at the original site in a 1960s realignment, whereas New City Road has had access for vehicular traffic blocked off from the junction itself and is now accessed via Gladstone Street. The cross is now the meeting point of St George's Road, St George's Place, Clarendon Place and New City Road (blocked entry).

Most of the buildings at the Cross were demolished in the 1960s and 70s when rebuilding work for the M8 motorway, and realignment of the roads left only two of the original buildings. There is a subway station of the same name located near to the Cross.

There is a small public space at the Cross, with a statue of St George and the Dragon, which was saved from the Co-operative Wholesale Society building at the cross when it was demolished.

Another junction a short distance to the south, Charing Cross, was also affected by the construction of the motorway.
