= 10 Elmbank Gardens =

Commercial building in Glasgow, Scotland

- Charing Cross Tower
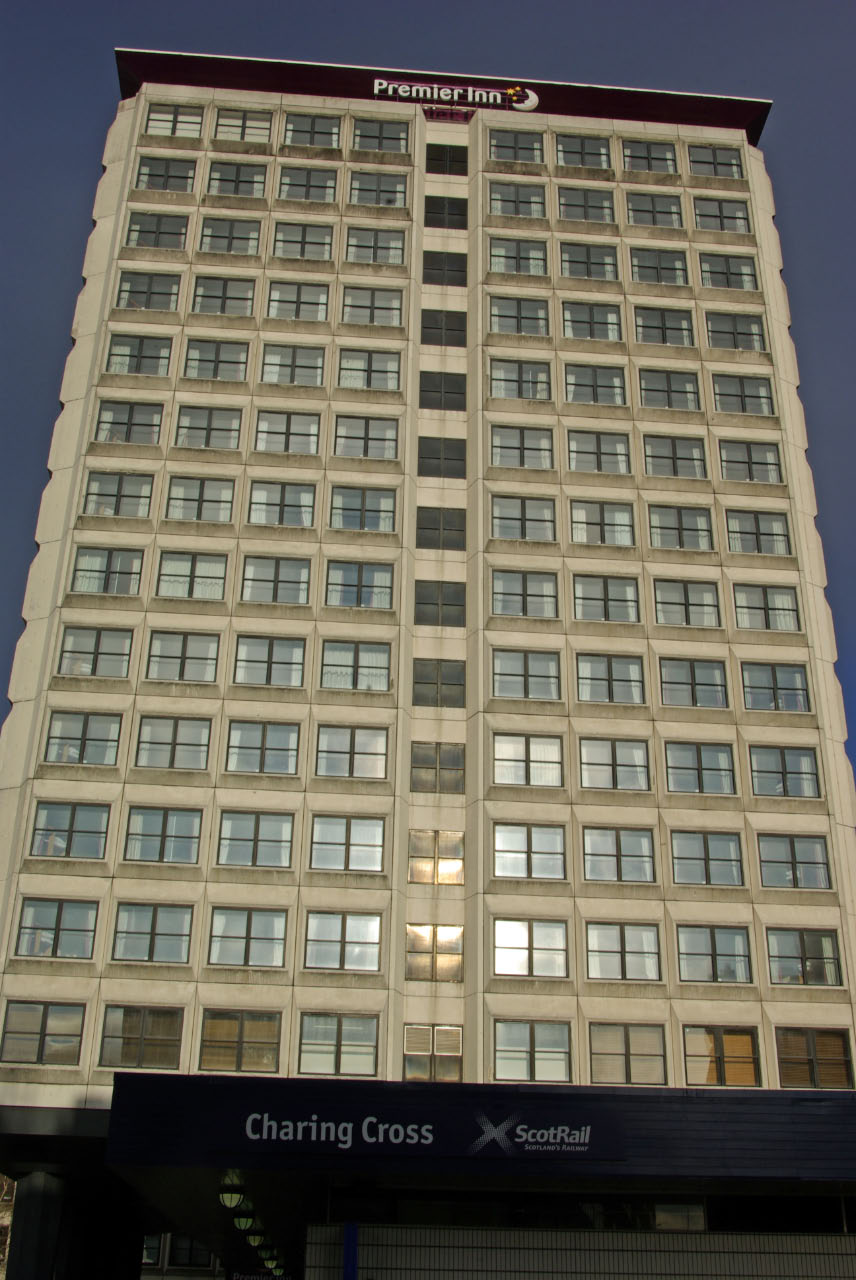
- 10 Elmbank Gardens (south west elevation)

General information
- Type: Offices (1975-92); Hotel (1995-present)
- Architectural style: Brutalist
- Location: Charing Cross, Glasgow, Scotland
- Coordinates: 55°51′53.59″N 4°16′11.74″W
- Groundbreaking: 1971
- Completed: 1974
- Opened: 1975
- Renovated: 1994

Height
- Top floor: 14

Technical details
- Structural system: Pre-cast Concrete
- Lifts/elevators: 3

Design and construction
- Architect: R.Seifert Company & Partnership

10 Elmbank Gardens is a prominent high-rise building in the Charing Cross area of Glasgow, Scotland. The signature 13-storey tower (often nicknamed the Charing Cross Tower or the Elmbank Tower) overlooks the M8 motorway and stands directly opposite the Mitchell Library, it was designed by Richard Seifert and constructed between 1971 and 1975. It is one of the tallest and most prominent high rise buildings on the western side of Glasgow city centre, beyond Blythswood Hill. The building once formed part of a wider complex of mixed-use commercial buildings known as the Charing Cross Complex, but as of 2026 these have been demolished as part of wider plans to regenerate the Charing Cross area, with only the tower remaining.

== History ==
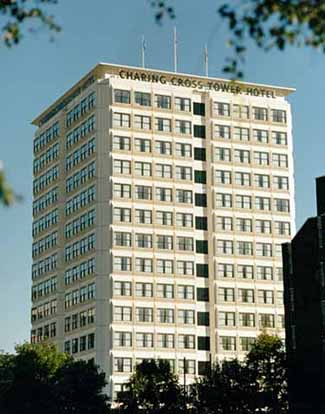
Elmbank Gardens in 1995, as the Charing Cross Tower Hotel

The 1960s saw great change in Glasgow, following on from the Bruce Report with initiatives well under way to depopulate the overcrowded centre, removing slum housing and the construction of a new system of high speed roads around the central area. The districts of Charing Cross and Anderston lay in the path of the Glasgow Inner Ring Road (now part of the M8) and consequently huge swathes of buildings were demolished to make way for its construction. The Richard Seifert Co-Partnership won the commission for much of the regeneration plan for the area, a grand scheme was planned which would stretch from the former Anderston Cross to the Charing Cross area. The original plans for the 'Charing Cross Complex' (as the buildings were originally named) would have made use of the infamous Charing Cross Podium which stretched across the motorway, but in the end only fragments of the Seifert scheme were built - likewise his nearby Anderston Centre was never fully realized either.

Whilst much of the tower was constructed in 1971, work was halted for nearly 3 years after structural problems due to subsidence in the area, and following repairs the building was finally completed in 1974.

The original tenant of the building was YARD (Yarrow-Admiralty Research Department) - part of the naval shipbuilder Yarrow Shipbuilders - and it was officially opened by Prince Philip, Duke of Edinburgh, in 1976. YARD Ltd. was acquired by CAP Group when it purchased Yarrow plc in 1986, which in turn merged to form Sema Group in 1988. The YARD subsidiary remained the tenant until 1992 when the merger of CAP Scientific with British Aerospace to form BAeSEMA resulted in consolidation of its activities in the city and it moved to a new office building at 1 Atlantic Quay on the Broomielaw. The building was vacated, and stood empty for over two years until a new use was found.

In the early 1990s, the Glasgow Development Agency had undertaken market research which showed that there would be a need for 650 budget hotel bedrooms in the city by late 1995. With this in mind, in 1994 the a lease on the building was taken by a company called Surveylink from its owner, Westmoreland Properties, to create a 270 bedroom hotel which was to be operated by the YMCA. The £4.5 million refurbishment of the building was undertaken by Taylor Woodrow (Scotland) Ltd to designs of Geoffrey Reid Associates and Structural Engineers Crouch Hogg Waterman, under the supervision of Surveylink who had their offices on the top floor of the building. The hotel opened in March 1995, creating 50 jobs. During the renovation, the building received a canopy on the roof, creating a covered "14th floor" to disguise the elevator penthouse.

The two low rise blocks of the complex along Newton Street and Bath Street became legally separate entities from the hotel tower, and are owned by London & Scottish Property Investment Management (LSPIM), and assumed the "Elmbank Gardens" and "Venlaw Building" names in the 1990s after the original street address of the building. The hotel tower itself was later operated by Premier Lodge, Premier Inn, and in 2022 was then taken over by Britannia Hotels.

A proposal to demolish the unused podium at the north west corner of the structure and replace it with a 19-storey residential tower known as The Venlaw Tower (earlier styled as Elmbank Tower) was proposed in 2004, but did not progress.

The complex was externally refurbished between 2012 and 2013, the precast concrete panels being restored to their original brilliant white finish.

== Construction ==
The development has a close conceptual similarity to Seifert's famous Centre Point complex in London, being a series of low rise offices and retail units between two and five stories, anchored by a high rise office tower. The complex also incorporated an unused extension to the adjacent King's Theatre. These elements frame a sunken garden in the centre, providing a focus for pedestrian flows from both Bath Street and Elmbank Crescent. Two cast concrete murals by local artists Charles Anderson and Keith McCarter feature on the internal pathways of the complex.

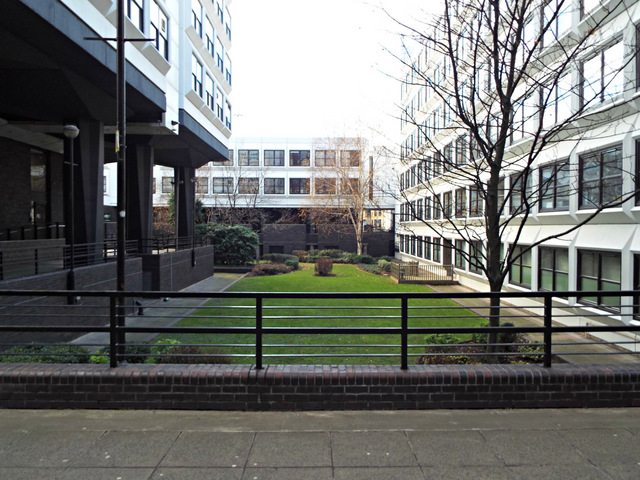
The sunken garden between the tower base and the two low rise blocks, which were demolished in 2026

A podium structure to the north west between the West and North blocks was originally intended to carry a public house, but it was never used. Eventually a prefabricated structure (which now contains a snack bar) was erected on it. The building was also constructed in tandem with a replacement railway station on the subterranean section of the North Clyde Line which runs to the south of the site. The precast concrete elements were derived from those used in Seifert's other commission for the area - the Anderston Centre a few hundred meters to the south, and were also used in a slightly different form in the Sheraton Park Tower Hotel in London, which was built around the same period.

Although originally simply known as the "Charing Cross Complex", the Elmbank Gardens name originated from a lane which once connected Elmbank Crescent to Bath Street, and served a former church which stood on the site before the mass demolition in the 1960s to construct the motorway.

== Future developments ==
In August 2023, the owner of the complex, London and Scottish Property Investment (LSPIM) - announced the Charing Cross Masterplan in conjunction with Glasgow City Council. The plans will entail the partial demolition of 300 Bath Street (Tay House) and the two low rise blocks of Elmbank Gardens, to make way for new offices and student accommodation. Under the initial proposals, the 13-storey hotel tower will be spared destruction and will be integrated into the new development.

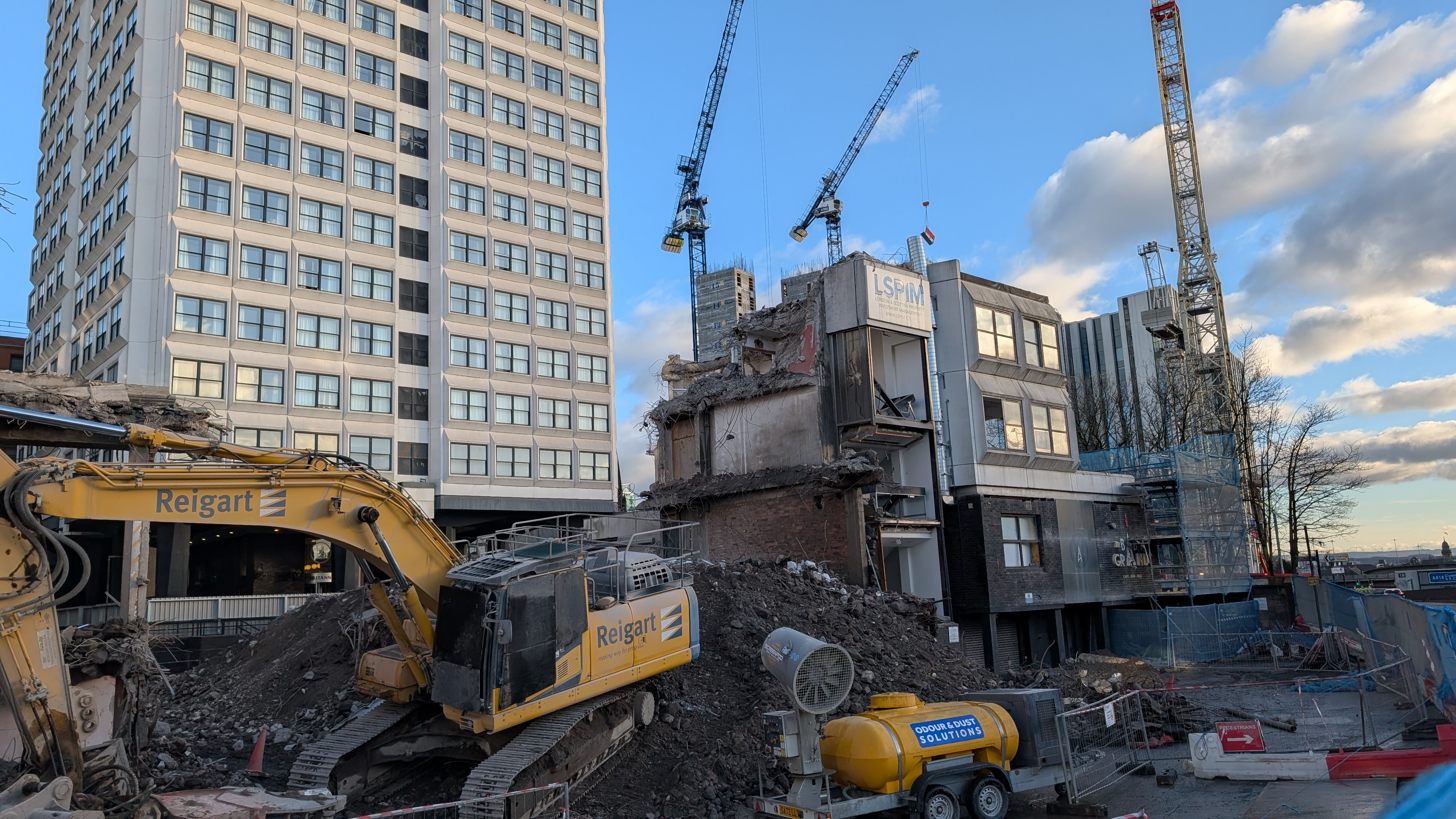
The low rise block on Newton Street undergoing demolition, February 2026

Demolition works of low rise block adjacent to Newton Street (which contained the Baby Grand restaurant and Seventh Heaven strip club) began in January 2026, with the Venlaw block on Bath Street following in April of that year, despite earlier objections from the architectural community that the demolition of the buildings represented "no understanding or lessons learned from the mistakes of Glasgow's urban regenerative past"

The redevelopment runs in parallel to two other schemes to regenerate the adjacent block between India Street and Elmbank Crescent, which will see Nye Bevan House and Portcullis House both replaced by high-rise student accommodation towers - one of which being The Ard - which will become Glasgow's tallest building upon its completion in 2028.

== In popular culture ==
The tower features prominently on the back cover of local band Deacon Blue’s debut album Raintown, on Oscar Marzaroli's atmospheric photo of the Kingston Bridge northern approach blasting through the city centre, with both Elmbank Gardens and the Mitchell Library both fully illuminated on either side of the busy motorway.
