= Charing Cross, Glasgow =

Road junction in Glasgow, Scotland

Charing Cross
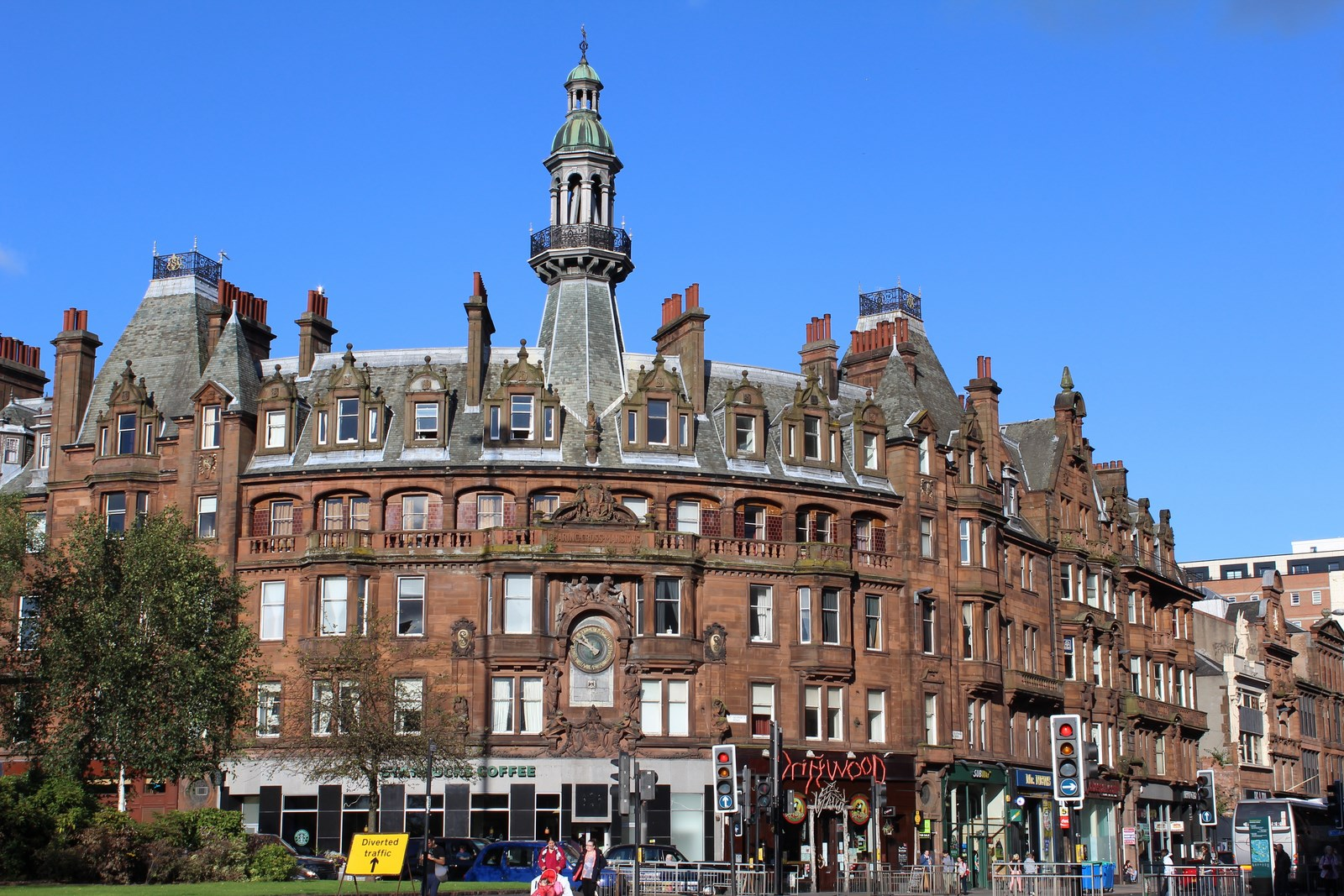
- Charing Cross Mansions, one of the city's oldest and grandest red sandstone tenements, built in 1891
- Interactive map of Charing Cross

Location
- Glasgow, Scotland
- Coordinates: 55°52′01″N 4°16′16″W
- Roads at junction: M8; A804; Sauchiehall Street; Woodlands Road

Construction
- Maintained by: Glasgow City Council

Charing Cross is a major road junction and area within the centre of Glasgow, Scotland. It is situated north of the River Clyde at the intersection of Sauchiehall Street, St George's Road, Woodlands Road, North Street and Newton Street, as well as being at a major interchange of the M8 motorway, which runs beneath in a subterranean cutting. Charing Cross marks the notional boundary between the City Centre and the West End of the city.

Charing Cross borders Woodlands to the west, Anderston to the south, Woodside to the north, and Garnethill to the east.

== Architecture ==
=== Notable buildings ===
Taking its name originally from a block of tenements named Charing Cross Place built in the 1850s, which continue at the south-west corner with North Street, the junction of Sauchiehall Street was formed as part of the original development of Blythswood Hill including Blythswood Square, St George's Road and North Street becoming known as Charing Cross, linking the city centre and the new West End, commencing at Woodlands and Sandyford. There are ornate red sandstone tenement blocks dating from the late Victorian period at two corners of the junction, at the north-west (St George's Mansions, Frank Burnet) and south-east (Charing Cross Mansions, John James Burnet), while nearby landmarks include the Mitchell Library. Charing Cross was also part of the so-called Square Mile of Murder, the location of a series of sensational murders which scandalised Victorian society.

=== 1960s redevelopment: the construction of the M8 ===
Much of Charing Cross' architecture (along with that of adjacent Anderston) was destroyed when the West Flank of the Glasgow Inner Ring Road (now part of the M8 motorway) was built through it in the late 1960s. Although the road was partially concealed beneath an underpass constructed using the cut-and-cover method, its construction required the excavation of a massive trench (often nicknamed "The Charing Cross Canyon") which necessitated the demolition of many Victorian and Edwardian buildings - notably the Grand Hotel at its heart.

The most infamous structure of the motorway's construction, however, became the "Bridge to Nowhere" – a concrete podium over the motorway, on top of which it was intended that an office building be constructed. Despite a string of new office blocks being constructed to replace the demolished buildings – Newton House, Elmbank Gardens, Nye Bevan House and Portcullis House in the early 1970s, and Fountain House in the early 1980s – the podium structure was left unused for over 20 years and became a source of much derision from both the local press and public, being looked upon as a monument to the partial abandonment of the controversial Inner Ring Road project.

As such, the podium was not developed until 1992 when Tay House (300 Bath Street) – a distinctive salmon pink 160,000 square feet (15,000 m^{2}) office building, was constructed atop the structure. Although it contained prestigious tenants such as Barclays Wealth, Tay House was later derided as one of Glasgow's ugliest buildings, and is slated for demolition under the regeneration masterplan (see "Future Developments" below)

In 2019, Glasgow City Council put forward plans to cover over more of the motorway with a parkland area to better connect the two districts on each side.

Charing Cross railway station is a short distance to the south; the nearest Glasgow Subway station is St George's Cross, located at the junction of the same name to the north of Charing Cross, also much diminished in its importance by the installation of the M8.

Nearby is an abstract concrete relief mural by Keith McCarter, made in 1971 as part of the Elmbank Gardens office complex.

== Future developments ==
In 2022, a consultation was launched by Glasgow City Council on the regeneration of the area and plans to improve the public realm of Charing Cross and relink the communities that were severed by the construction of the M8 in the late 1960s. A key plank of the proposals continues to be the construction of a raised garden to partially cover the trench in which the motorway runs The Charing Cross Gateway ("CXG") project was unveiled in August 2023 by London and Scottish Property Investments (L&SPI) – the owner of the Tay House and Elmbank Gardens office complexes which occupy much of the required land.

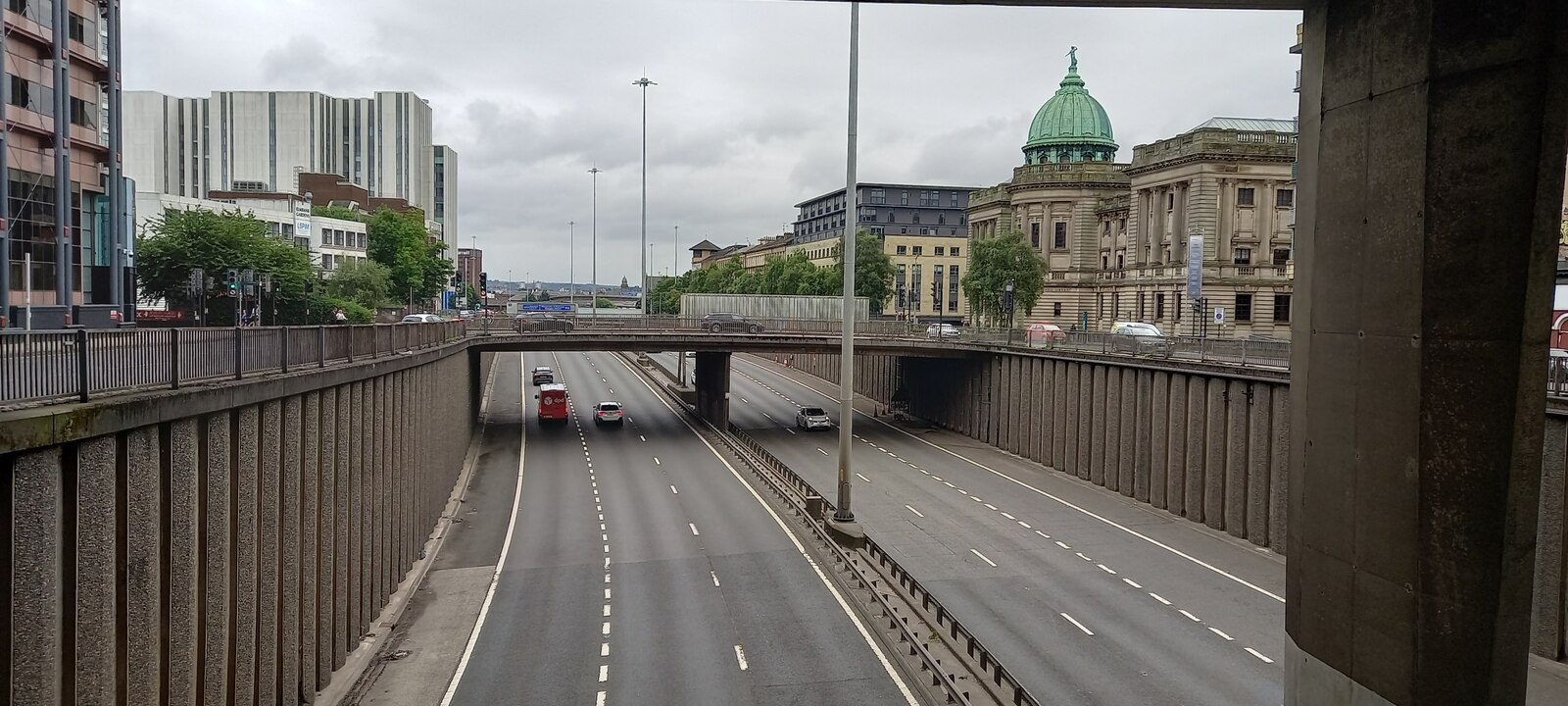
The infamous "Charing Cross Canyon" (with the Mitchell Library featuring prominently to the right) carrying the M8 motorway south towards Anderston and the Kingston Bridge

Under the proposals, the section of Tay House (300 Bath Street) which sits atop the infamous podium structure will be demolished, whilst the remaining structure of the building will be repurposed as either a new office block or residential complex. Meanwhile, the Elmbank Gardens complex will see both of its low-rise office blocks demolished with its 13-storey hotel tower remaining in place, which will be integrated into the new development. The surface buildings of Charing Cross Station will also be demolished and replaced. The city block bordered by Bath Street, Newton Street and Elmbank Streets will be repurposed for new office developments and student apartment towers. Additional proposals for the adjacent block further south on India Street - will see the former sites of Nye Bevan House and Portcullis House cleared and redeveloped with a new 36-storey student accommodation tower known as The Ard

== Gallery ==
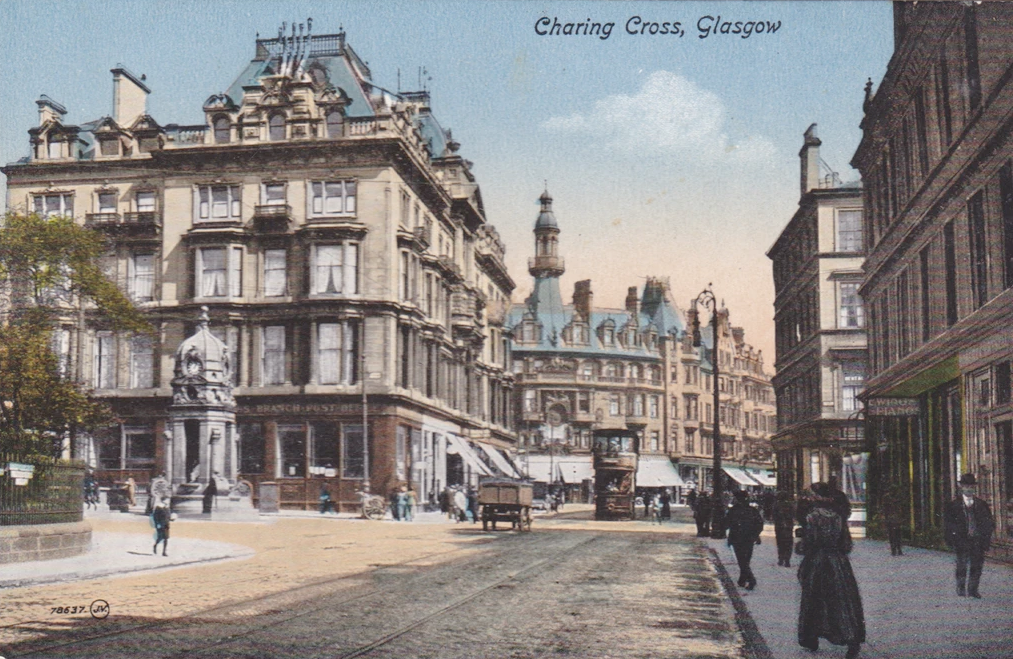
Charing Cross around the turn of the 19th century, with the Grand Hotel on the left

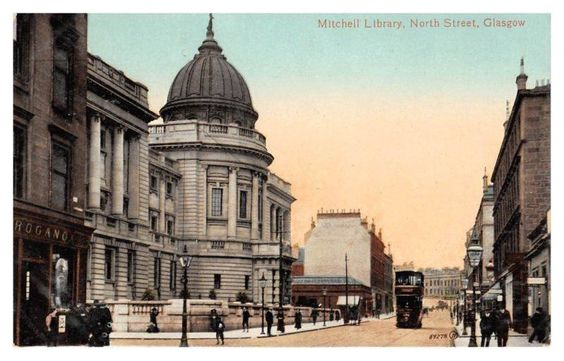
The Mitchell Library in North Street, c. 1912

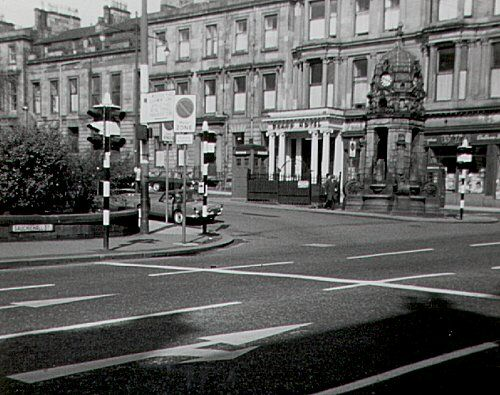
The Cameron Memorial Fountain besides the Grand Hotel, 1966

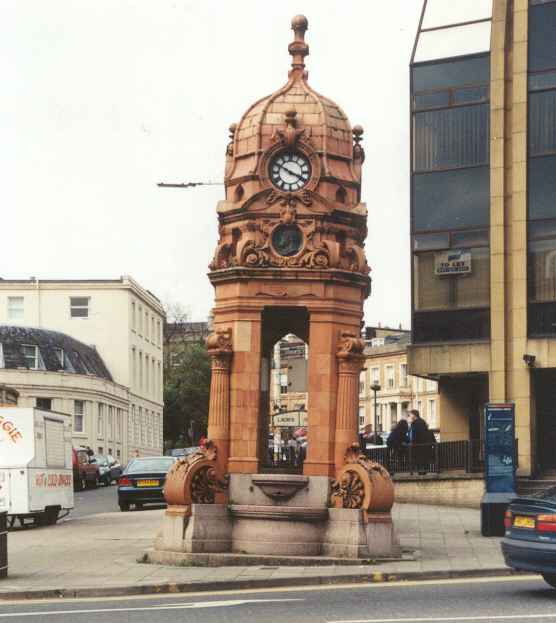
The Cameron Memorial Fountain pictured in 2011

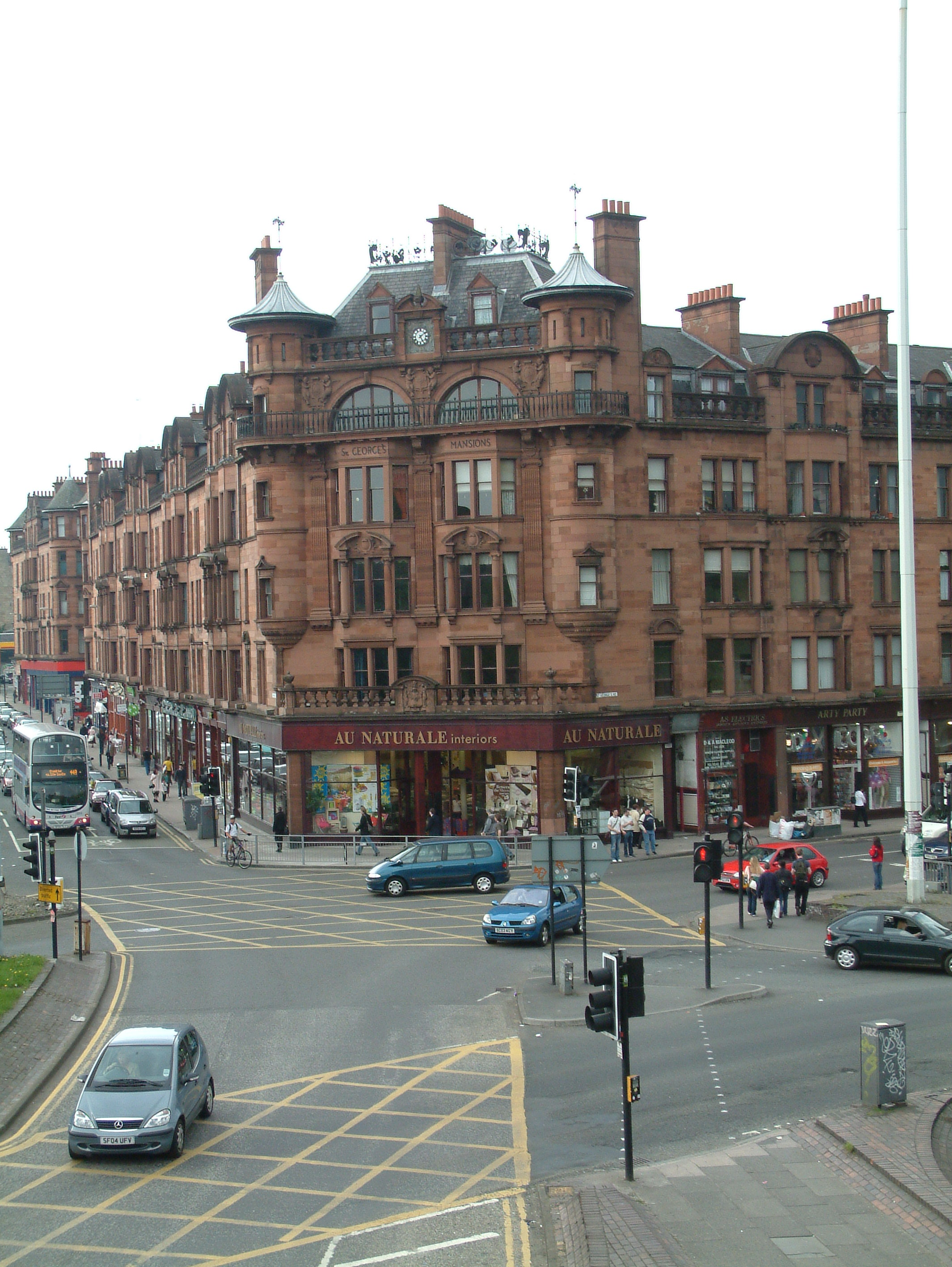
Charing Cross looking west, towards Woodlands Road

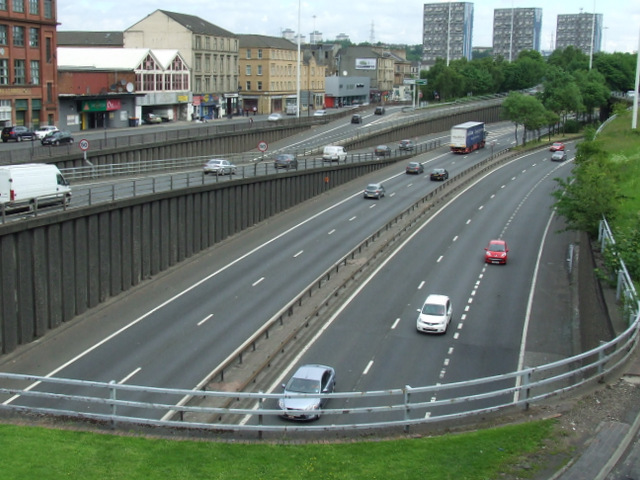
The Charing Cross underpass on the M8 motorway, looking north

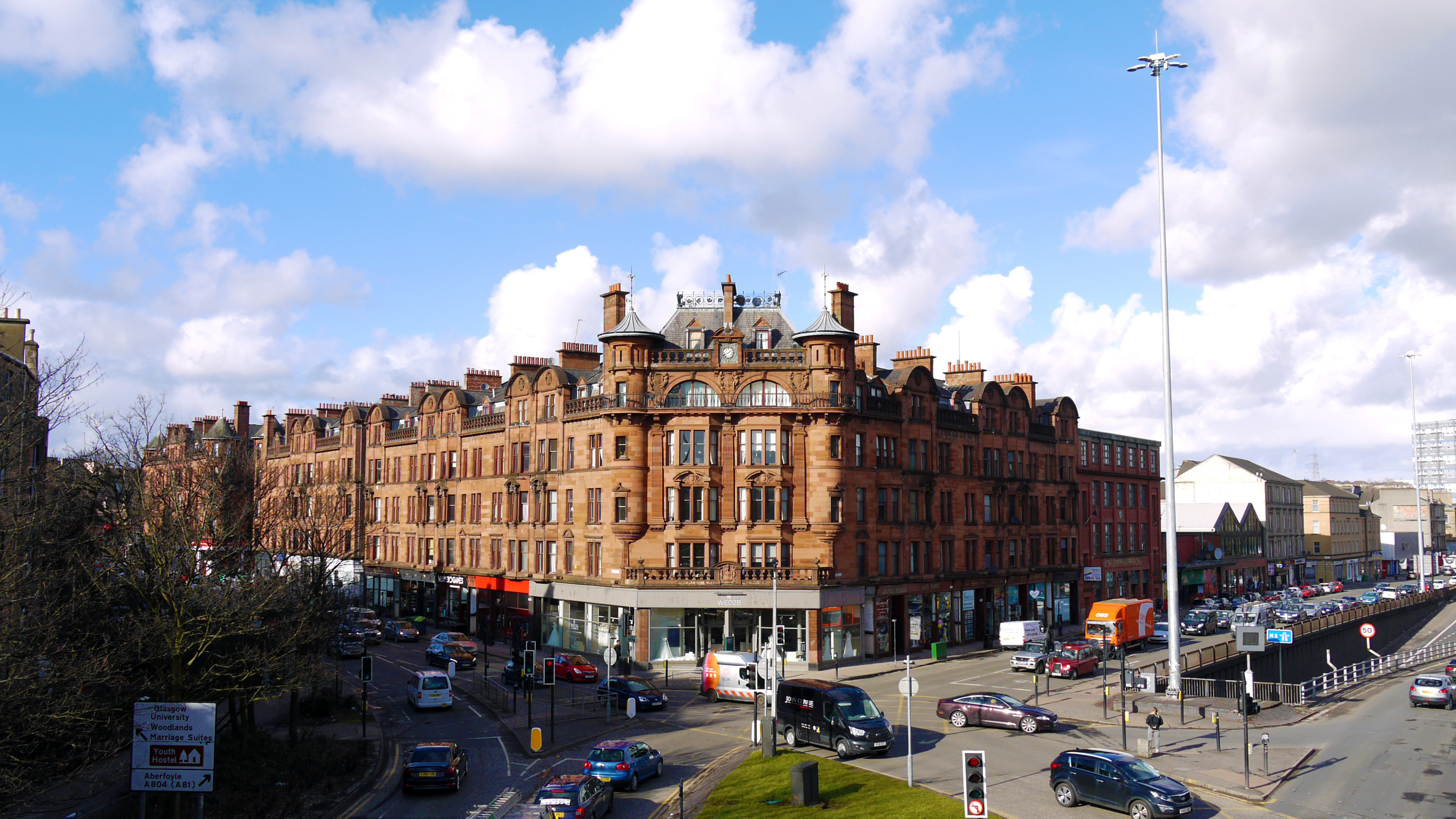
St George's Mansions, built in 1901

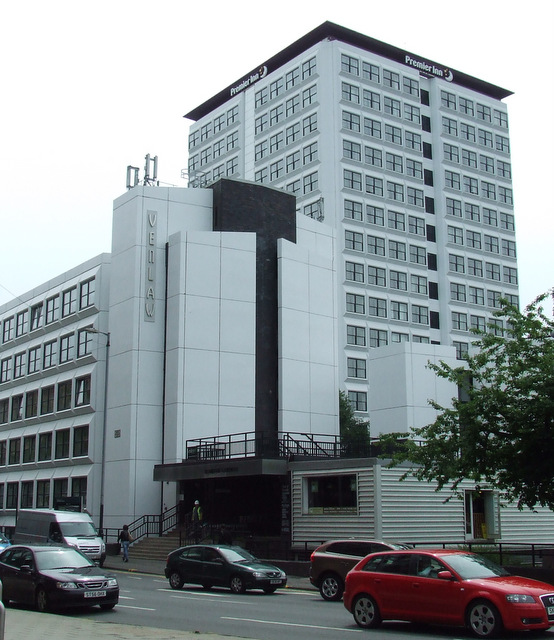
Elmbank Gardens, an office complex built in 1971; the tower is now a hotel.

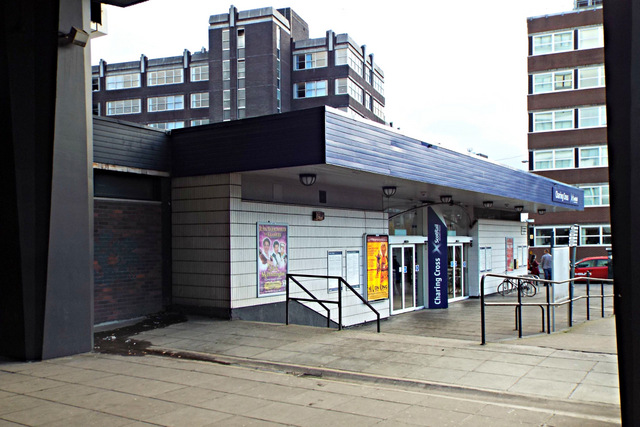
Charing Cross railway station, with Nye Bevan House and Portcullis House - office blocks constructed in the early 1970s

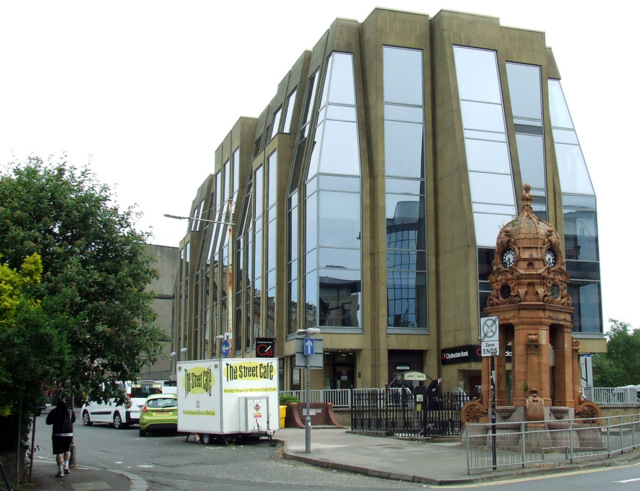
Fountain House, an office block built in 1982, named for the Cameron Memorial Fountain (in the foreground)

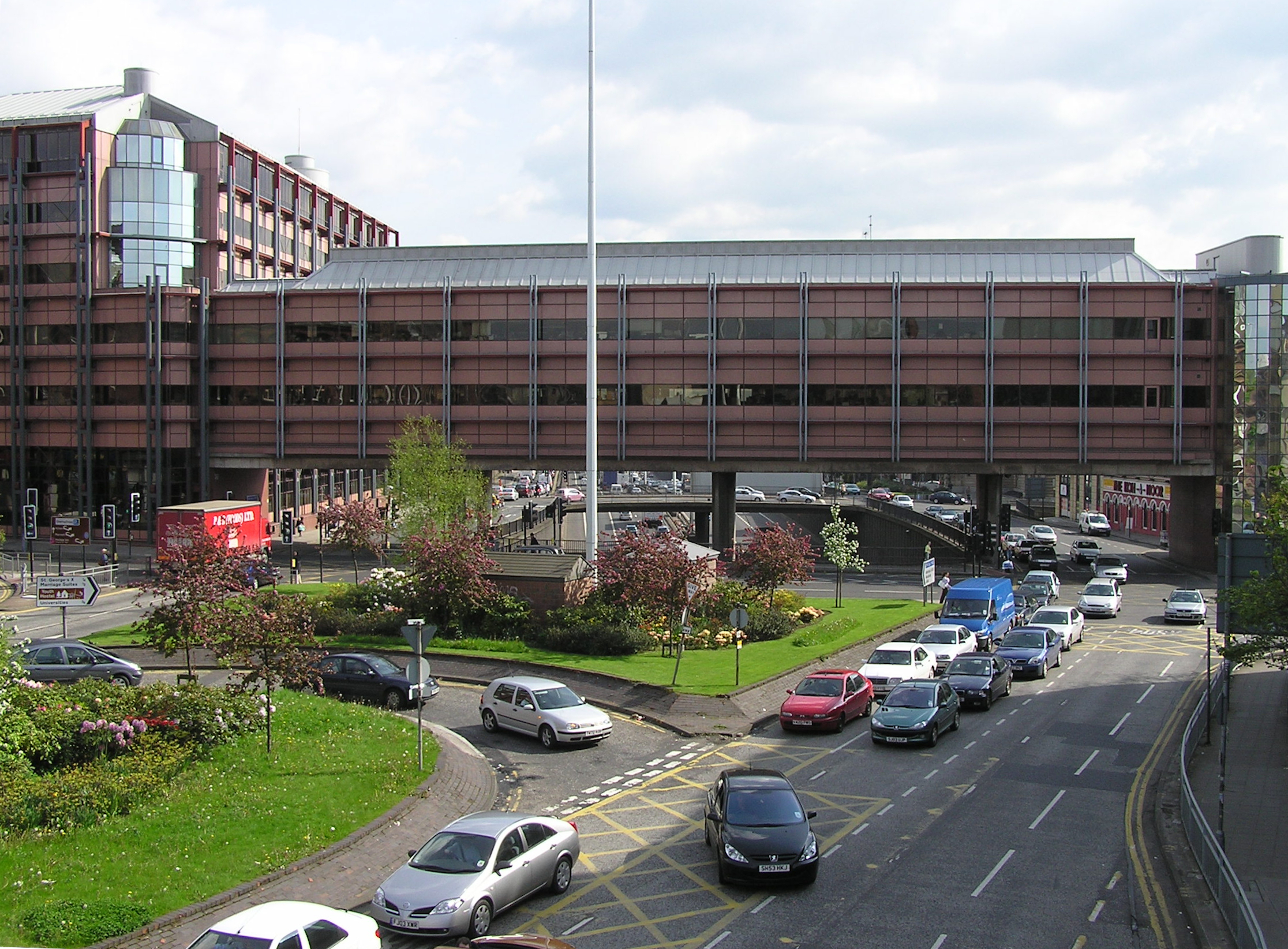
The Charing Cross Podium, which was developed into Tay House in 1992

Concrete mural by Keith McCarter underneath the Elmbank Gardens hotel tower
