= Nye Bevan House =

Regional headquarters building in Glasgow, Scotland

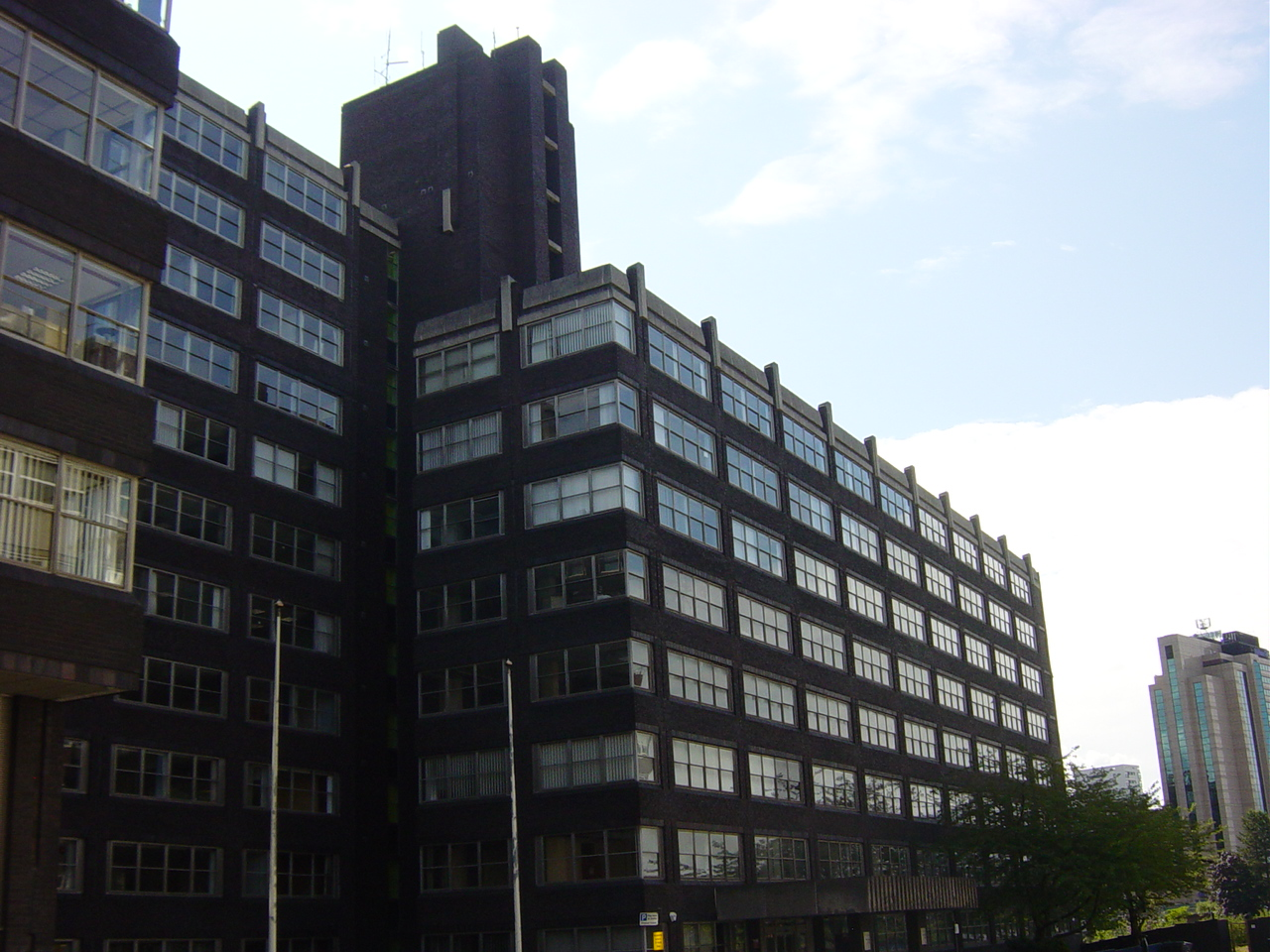
- Nye Bevan House (west elevation), looking south east, with the Hilton Glasgow in the background

- Location within Glasgow council area
- Former names: Viceroy House

General information
- Status: Demolished
- Architectural style: Modern style
- Location: 20 India Street, Glasgow, Scotland
- Coordinates: 55.8640°N 4.2693°W
- Completed: 1974
- Demolished: 2015
- Client: Strathclyde Regional Council

Design and construction
- Architects: E.S. Boyer & Partners

Nye Bevan House was a large office development located in the Blythswood Hill area of Glasgow, Scotland. It formed part of the complex of buildings known as Strathclyde House which collectively served as the offices and meeting place of Strathclyde Regional Council from when it was formed in 1975 until it was eventually abolished in 1996.

== History ==
India Street was previously occupied by a terrace of Georgian style houses which included a well-appointed hotel known as "More's Hotel", whose visitors included, in summer 1937, the American conductor and composer, George Szell. India Street was substantially redeveloped in the early 1970s as part of a wider initiative to redevelop the Charing Cross area to make way for the M8 motorway.

The building was designed by E. S. Boyer & Partners in the Modern style, built in dark brick and glass and was completed in 1974. The design involved a main frontage facing India Street with another shorter wing extending eastwards along Elmbank Crescent. The main frontage was faced with alternating bands of dark brick and steel-framed windows and the building ranged in height up to nine storeys. The building was initially called "Viceroy House".

== Strathclyde House ==
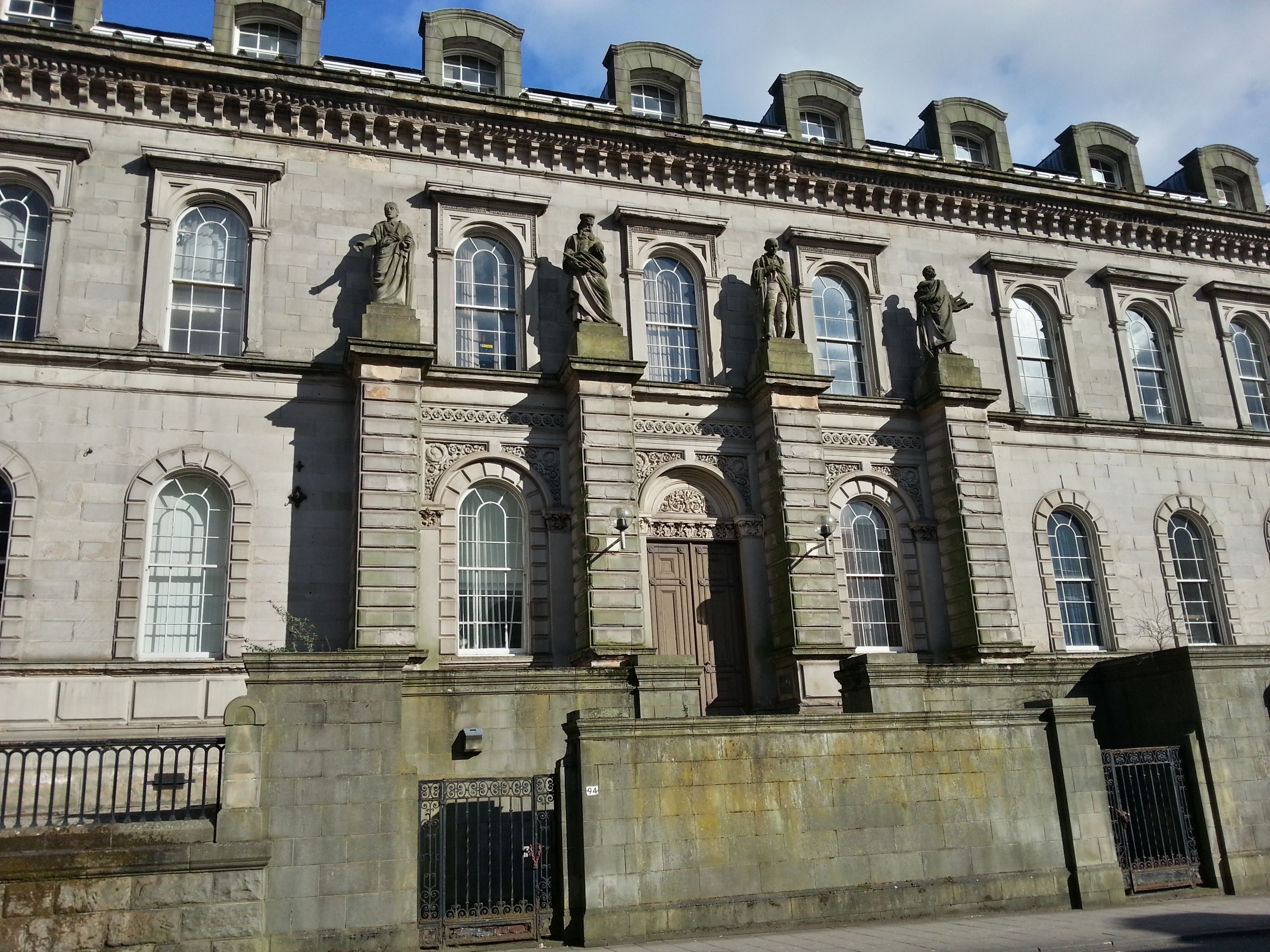
Main building of old High School (1846), became Strathclyde House 8.

Strathclyde Regional Council was created in 1975. The council initially rented offices called Melrose House at 19 Cadogan Street in Glasgow to act as an interim headquarters pending a decision being taken on a permanent headquarters. Various other offices around the centre of Glasgow were also used for additional office space, including Viceroy House and other modern buildings near it on India Street (the Glasgow City Chambers was not used by the regional administration and was instead the headquarters for the Glasgow district). In 1976, the nearby former Glasgow High School buildings on Elmbank Street were vacated. The council decided to convert the former school buildings to become its headquarters, using the nearby offices in India Street as additional accommodation. The remodelled school and offices were formally opened by Elizabeth II on 2 November 1979, when the whole complex was renamed "Strathclyde House".

Despite the singular name, Strathclyde House was in fact eleven main buildings, which were distinguished from each other as "Strathclyde House 1", "Strathclyde House 2" and so on:

Building	Location	Notes
Strathclyde House 1	Elmbank Crescent	Northern wing of Viceroy House, completed 1974. After 1996 became part of Nye Bevan House, demolished 2015.
Strathclyde House 2	20 India Street	Main part of Viceroy House, completed 1974. After 1996 became part of Nye Bevan House, demolished 2015.
Strathclyde House 3	6 India Street	Subsequently demolished to make was for the Scottish Power building.
Strathclyde House 4	1–3 India Street	Also called Clive House. Subsequently demolished to make way for the Scottish Power building.
Strathclyde House 5	High School site, 71–83 Holland Street (on corner with Bath Lane)	Dining room of the old High School, built 1897 to designs of J. L. Cowan. Was converted to become the council chamber.
Strathclyde House 6	High School site, 94 Elmbank Street	Former science block of High School, built 1931/2 to designs of John Watson.
Strathclyde House 7	High School site, 94 Elmbank Street	Northern extension (1887) to main school building.
Strathclyde House 8	High School site, 94 Elmbank Street	Main building of school, built 1846 to designs of Charles Wilson.
Strathclyde House 9	High School site, 94 Elmbank Street	Southern extension (1897) to main school building, contained the gymnasium.
Strathclyde House 10	High School site, 94 Elmbank Street	Modern building at south-east corner of school site facing Holland Street.
Strathclyde House 11	314–320 St Vincent Street	Subsequently demolished to make way for the Scottish Power building.

Blocks 5 to 9 at the old school site are all Category A listed buildings. The council also had other offices nearby, including Dalian House, on the corner of St Vincent Street and North Street.

Following the implementation of the Local Government etc. (Scotland) Act 1994, Strathclyde Regional Council was abolished in 1996. Blocks 3, 4 and 11 were all sold soon after the council's abolition for redevelopment. Blocks 1 and 2 were together renamed Nye Bevan House to recall the life of the Labour Party politician, Nye Bevan. That building was eventually demolished in 2015.

Blocks 5 to 10 at the old High School site were used by Glasgow City Council after 1996 as additional office space. The council chamber there was briefly used in 2000 by the Scottish Parliament, with its new permanent home at Holyrood under construction and the temporary buildings in Edinburgh booked out. Glasgow City Council sold the old High School buildings in 2010 but a new use has yet to be found for them.

== Future Developments ==
The former footprint of Nye Bevan House still remained empty as of 2024, whilst neighbouring Portcullis House had been purchased by Watkin Jones Group in October 2020 for an undisclosed sum, for the eventual construction of The Ard, a 36 storey student accommodation tower.

In April 2024, a planning application was submitted to Glasgow City Council for a 16-storey residential tower to be constructed on the former site of Nye Bevan House; the plan, which also included 20 social housing flats and a ground floor commercial unit, was given formal approval in December 2024.
