= Murder of Esther Brown =

2021 murder in Glasgow

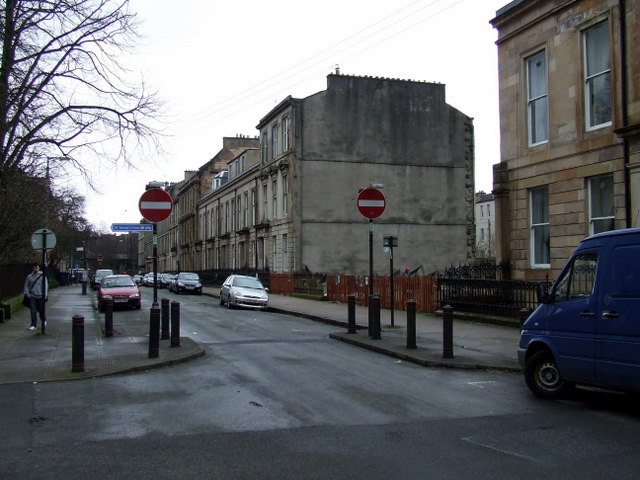
- West Princes Street, Woodlands, Glasgow; the location of the murder.
- Date: 28 May 2021
- Location: Woodlands, Glasgow, Scotland; 55.8715°N 4.2774°W
- Type: Rape, Murder
- Suspects: Jason Graham
- Charges: Rape, Murder
- Trial: Glasgow High Court, 15 October 2021
- Verdict: Guilty
- Sentence: 19 years

On 28 May 2021, Scottish pensioner Esther Brown was raped and murdered in her flat in Woodlands, Glasgow, Scotland. Jason Graham (also known as Jason Evans), a registered sex offender, who was unknown to her, was found guilty of her rape and murder on 12 November 2021, and sentenced to at least 19 years in jail.

== Perpetrator ==
Jason Graham did not know Brown, and was a registered sex offender. He was aged 30 at the time he raped and murdered Brown. Graham legally changed his name to Jason Evans shortly before the attack. It was reported that while in prison, Jason Graham had attempted to change gender.

== Murder and trial ==
Brown was kicked, punched and stamped on by Graham on 28 May 2021.

She was reported missing the same day and found dead on 1 June at her flat in Glasgow's Woodlands on West Princes Street.

On 7 June an arrest was made and Graham was charged, suspected of brutally killing the elderly woman in her own home. After killing her, he allegedly used Brown's bank card to purchase cigarettes.

On 15 October 2021, Jason Graham pleaded guilty to the murder at the Justiciary Buildings in Glasgow On 17 November, he was found guilty to the murder and was sentenced to 19 years.

== Aftermath ==
A 2022 memorial was planned for Brown, in recognition of her community activism.

In March 2022, MSP Pauline McNeill called for changes to Clare's Law to account for perpetrators of crimes who change their names, specifically citing Graham's actions before the murder. The Scottish Conservatives called for greater transparency around parole decisions.

An inquiry into Brown's rape and murder investigated the circumstances that led up to the event, including the release of the perpetrator from imprisonment in 2018. The inquiry described Brown's assault and killing as a spontaneous and opportunistic event that could not be prevented.

== See also ==
- List of solved missing person cases (2020s)
