= St George's Cross subway station =

Glasgow Subway station

St George's Cross Crois an Naoimh Seòras
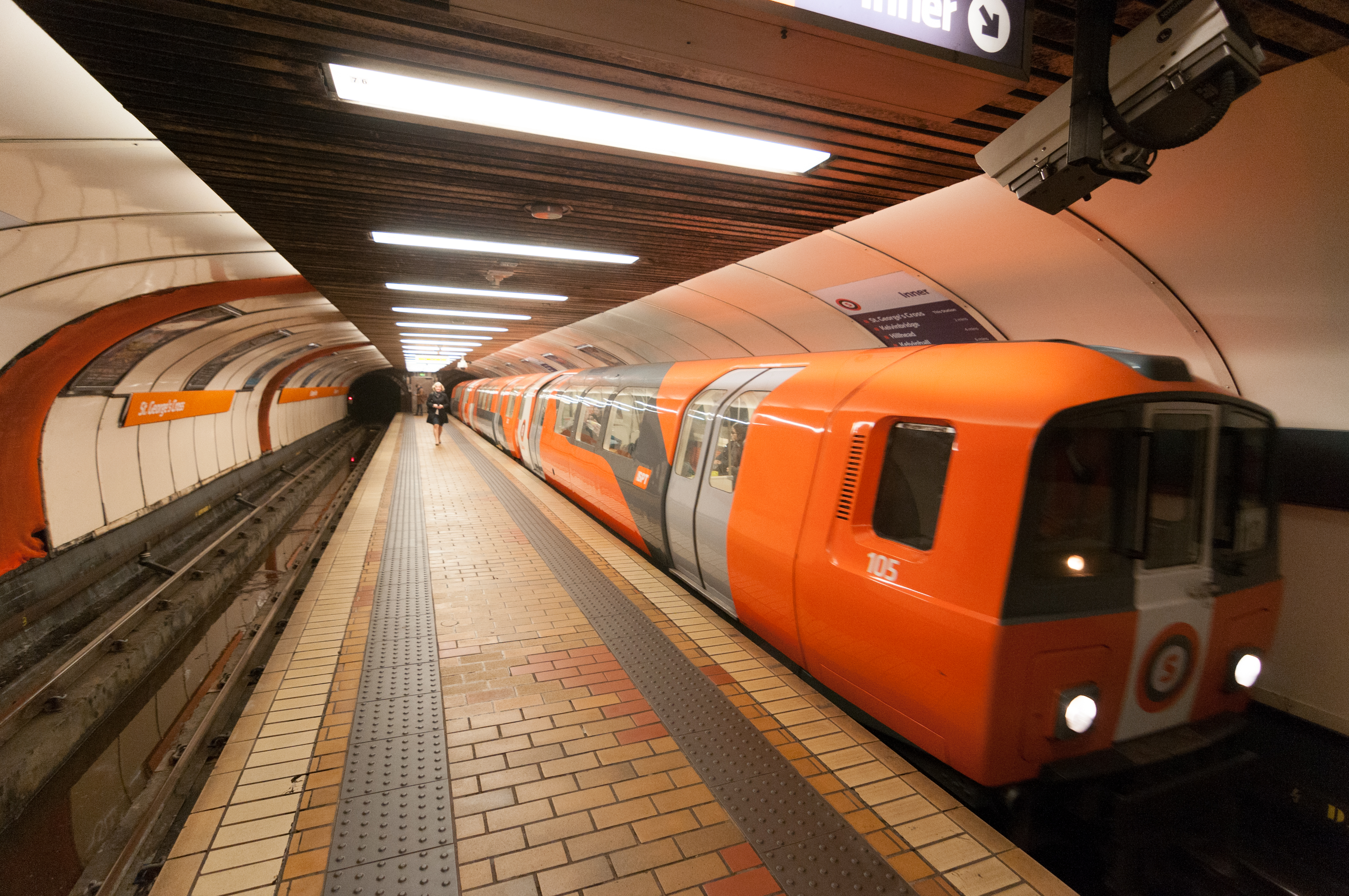

General information
- Location: 51 Great Western Road; Woodside, Glasgow, G4 9AH; Scotland
- Coordinates: 55°52′19″N 4°16′11″W
- Operator: SPT
- Transit authority: SPT
- Platforms: 2 (island platform)
- Tracks: 2

Construction
- Structure type: Underground
- Parking: No
- Cycle facilities: Yes (bike hire)
- Accessible: No

Other information
- Fare zone: 1

History
- Opened: 14 December 1896
- Rebuilt: 16 April 1980; 46 years ago

Passengers
- 2018: ▲0.542 million
- 2019: ▼0.516 million
- 2020: ▼0.202 million
- 2021: ▲0.267 million
- 2022: ▲0.472 million

Services
Preceding station	SPT	Following station
Kelvinbridge anticlockwise / inner circle	Glasgow Subway	Cowcaddens clockwise / outer circle
Location
Notes
- Passenger statistics provided are gate entries only. Information on gate exits for patronage is incomplete, and thus not included.

St George's Cross subway station (Scottish Gaelic: Crois an Naoimh Seòras) is a Glasgow Subway station in Glasgow, Scotland which serves the areas of Woodside and Woodlands of the city. It is located at St George's Cross, previously an important road junction but realigned due to the construction of the M8 motorway and less heavily used by traffic since then. Today the station serves mainly the eastern extremity of Great Western Road and the northern reaches of the neighbouring Charing Cross district.

The station was opened in 1896 and retains its original island platform configuration. The surface buildings were demolished and rebuilt in 1971 as part of the construction of the Glasgow Inner Ring Road – making this the only station on the system to be substantially rebuilt prior to the 1977–80 modernisation. The original aesthetic of the new station – characterised by concrete aggregate cladding was therefore short-lived – during the modernisation project this was replaced with the new corporate style of the new Subway with dark brown brick and orange tiling, which has survived to the present day.

This station recorded 580,000 boardings in the twelve months ending on 31 March 2005.

St George's Cross is one of the stations mentioned in Cliff Hanley's song "The Glasgow Underground".

== Past passenger numbers ==
- 2011/12: 0.544 million annually
