= Hilton Glasgow =

Hotel in Glasgow, United Kingdom

Coordinates: 55.86137°N 4.26861°W

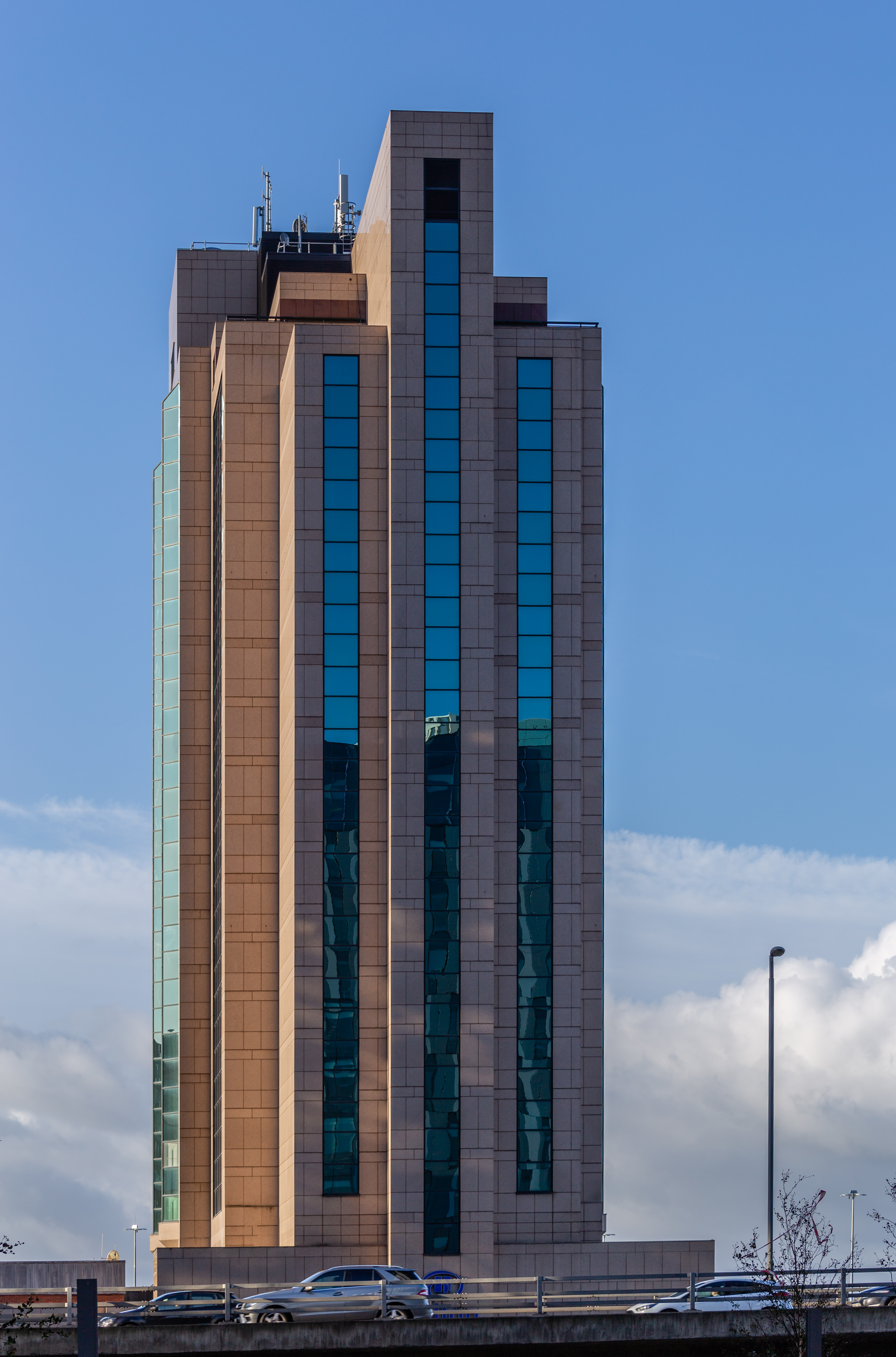
- The Hilton Glasgow Hotel as viewed from Vincent Street, 2018
- Interactive map of the Hilton Glasgow area
- Hotel chain: Hilton Hotels & Resorts

General information
- Type: Hotel
- Location: 1 William Street, Glasgow, Scotland
- Opening: 1992
- Owner: Hilton Worldwide

Technical details
- Floor count: 20

Design and construction
- Architects: Crerar and Partners

Other information
- Number of rooms: 320
- Number of suites: 2
- Number of restaurants: 2

Website
- Official website

The Hilton Glasgow is a 20–storey hotel in Glasgow, Scotland. It is located in Anderston, 8 miles (13 kilometres) from Glasgow Airport, on the edge of the city centre, and close to the M8 Motorway. It opened on 30 November 1992, marking the first international hotel to open in the city, and is credited as being "first true five-star hotel" in Glasgow. Craig Gardner, former manager at the hotel, credits the Hilton Glasgow as paving the way for "playing a key role in the revitalisation of the city".

At 70 m (230 ft), the Hilton Glasgow is currently the 16th tallest building in Glasgow, behind St Andrew House at 71 m (233 ft) and ahead of Anniesland Court at 66 m (217 ft).

== Background ==
=== Construction and opening ===
Construction of the hotel began in 1990. It stands on a site within the Anderston Commercial Zone, an area cleared during the 1960s and designated by the then Glasgow Corporation for "comprehensive development". Originally the land was earmarked for the second phase of the Anderston Centre complex (early plans show that a public housing tower was planned for the spot where the hotel stands); however, this was abandoned, and the site lay derelict until the late 1980s. The hotel officially opened on 30 November 1992, St Andrews Day in Scotland. The building was formally opened by the Lord Provost of Glasgow, Robert Inness.

As well as being Hilton's first foray into Glasgow (it later took over the prestigious Stakis Grosvenor in the city's West End, and a third hotel was added to the portfolio in Finnieston), the hotel was notable for being the first high-rise building over 20 storeys to be constructed in Glasgow since its tower block building boom of the 1960s and early 1970s. The hotel has the largest banqueting hall in the city, and features 319 rooms and suites, the Raffles Bar, Minsky's deli restaurant, as well as a large ballroom that has capacity to accommodate up to 1,000 diners.

=== Construction method ===
The building was constructed using 20,000 cubic feet of concrete, 500 tonnes of cement, 9000 sq metres of granite, 200,000 wall blocks, 100,000m of timber and 230km of cabling. Donald Crerar from the architecture firm Crerar and Partners said that the site "is a prime site, close to the city centre without the congestion", further adding "this is, after all, an international hotel, and a large proportion of the business will come via the motorway and the airport". Further commenting on the location of the buildings construction, Crerar stated that "it is also very visible – one of the first things you see coming over the Kingston Bridge into the city from the airport".

== Famous guests ==
The hotel is notable for having accommodated many celebrities, including the former United States President Bill Clinton. The local actor and comedian Billy Connolly is also a regular guest, and was born a few streets away in the (now demolished) tenements of Anderston.

When American boxer Mike Tyson had a match at nearby Hampden Park, he booked 150 rooms for himself and his entourage. Hollywood actor Robert Duvall also stayed in one of the hotel's luxury suites for several weeks during filming of the movie A Shot at Glory, which was shot in and around the city.

== Award ceremonies ==
The Hilton Glasgow has hosted many award ceremonies. Some notable events include:

- 2014 Commonwealth Games – They were held in Glasgow, Scotland, from 23 July to 3 August 2014 and were the largest multi-sport event ever in Scotland, involving 4,950 athletes from 71 different nations and territories competing in 18 different sports. It was the third time the Commonwealth Games had been held in Scotland, and the 2014 Games were notable for the successes of the Home Nations of the United Kingdom, with England, Wales and hosts Scotland achieving their largest ever gold medal hauls and overall medal hauls at a Commonwealth Games.
- 2014 Ryder Cup for the 2014 Scottish Golf Awards – It is one of the biggest sporting events in the world and it was the first time in more than 40 years that the tournament had been staged in Scotland.

== See also ==
- List of tallest buildings and structures in Glasgow
- Hilton family
  - Hilton Hotels & Resorts
  - Hilton Worldwide
