= Keith McCarter =

- Born: 1936; Edinburgh
- Alma mater: Edinburgh College of Art
- Occupation: Sculptor
- Website: www.keith-mccarter.com

Keith McCarter is a Scottish sculptor, with several works on public display.

== Career ==
McCarter was born in Edinburgh in 1936 and studied at Edinburgh College of Art. He received an Andrew Grant Scholarship which allowed him to travel through Europe including Scandinavia, in 1960 and 1961. He then lived in America until 1963, working for Steuben Glass as a designer. Returning to the UK, he was from 1964 to 1968 a visiting lecturer at Hornsey College of Art.

He is known for his abstract sculptural relief in concrete, Celestial, which was commissioned by, and from 1969 to 2011 adorned the Southampton headquarters of, Ordnance Survey. As of December 2022, it was stored in a field in Milton Keynes, while a new home for it was sought.

As his career progressed, he switched from working in concrete to metal.

Several of his works of public art are on display.

== Personal life ==
McCarter's brother Graham also studied art, at Guildford Art College. In later life, McCarter became a full-time carer for his wife, Brenda. She died in 2022.

== Works ==
| Image | Title / subject | Location and coordinates | Date | Type | Material | Dimensions | Designation | Owner / administrator | Notes |
|---|---|---|---|---|---|---|---|---|---|
| | Celestial | Milton Keynes (in storage) | 1969 | | Concrete | | | | Seen on the former Ordnance Survey HQ, Maybush, Southampton in January 2011. |
| | Abstract Wall Relief | Elmbank Gardens, Glasgow 55.864969°N 4.269713°W | 1971 (circa) | | Concrete | 260 × 2340cm | | | 19, 130cm wide pre-cast concrete blocks, made in conjunction with R. Seifert Company and Partnership |
| | Ridirich | Aldgate, City of London | 1980 | | Bronze | 350cm (height) | | | Commemorates the centenary of George Wimpey Ltd. |
| | The Observer | 1020 19th Street, N.W., Washington DC 38.903198°N 77.043607°W | 1983 | | Bronze | | | Barnes, Morris, Pardoe, Foster | |
| | Questor | Godwin Street, Bradford, West Yorkshire 53.7929489°N 1.755904°W | 1998 | | Metal | 600cm (height) | | | Commissioned under the Per Cent for Arts Scheme by the developers, Huntingdon. |
| | Helios | Norfolk and Norwich University Hospital | 2001 | | Stainless steel & granite | 201 × 201 × 82cm | | | Commissioned by the Hospital Arts Project, sponsored by Octagon Healthcare Ltd. |
| | Aspiration | Riverside Business Park, Greenock 55.940035°N 4.720227°W | | | Steel | | | | |
