= Charing Cross railway station (Scotland) =

Railway station in Glasgow, Scotland

Charing Cross (Glasgow)
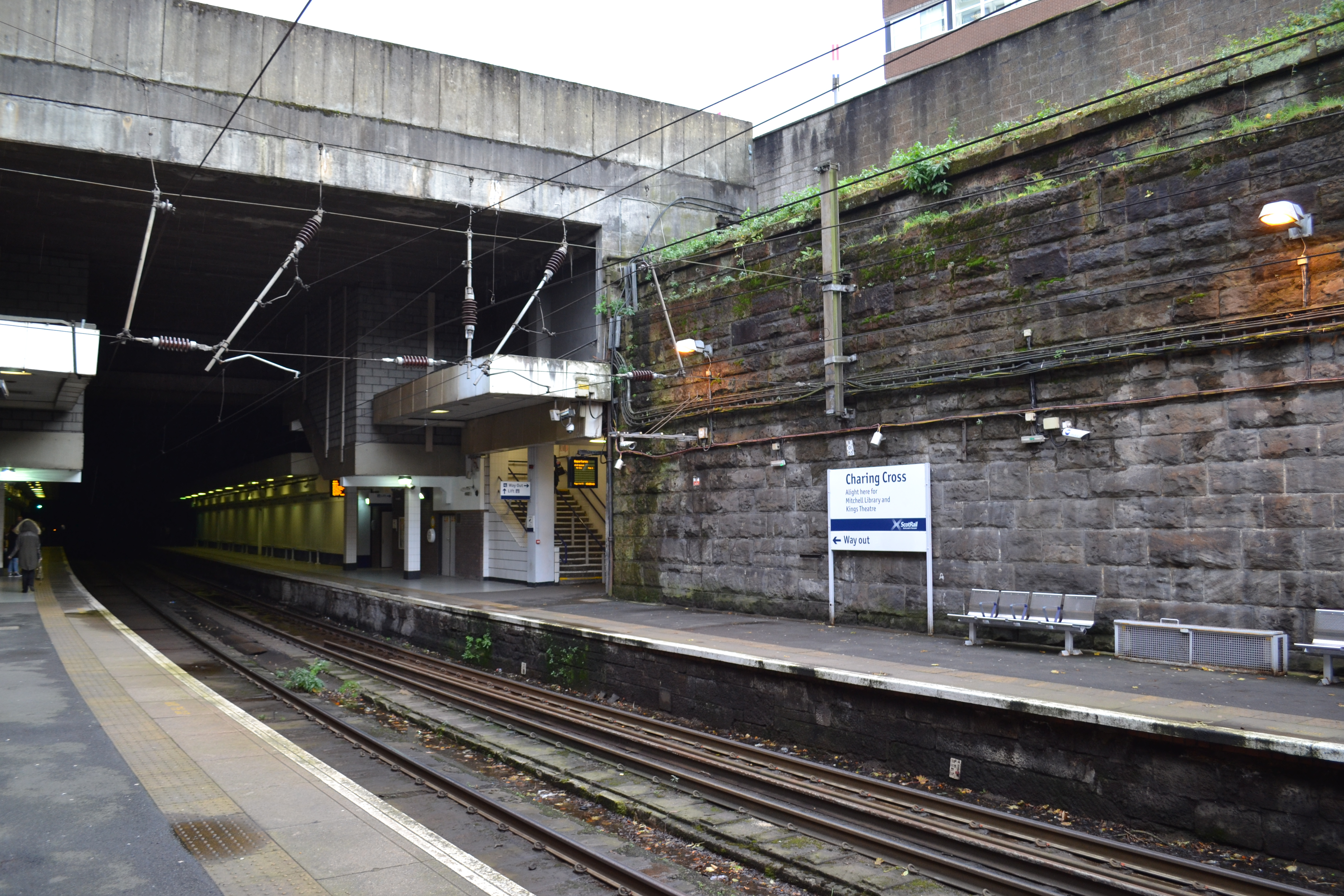

General information
- Location: Glasgow, Glasgow; Scotland
- Coordinates: 55.8647°N 4.2700°W
- Grid reference: NS580658
- Owner: Network Rail
- Manager: ScotRail
- Transit authority: SPT
- Platforms: 2

Other information
- Station code: CHC
- Fare zone: 1

Key dates
- 15 March 1886: Opened
- 1970: Rebuilt

Passengers
- 2020/21: ▼0.363 million
- 2021/22: ▲0.918 million
- 2022/23: ▲1.310 million
- 2023/24: ▲1.505 million
- 2024/25: ▲1.563 million
Location
Notes
- Passenger statistics from the Office of Rail and Road

Charing Cross (Glasgow) is a railway station in central Glasgow, Scotland, serving the district of the same name, and located on the notional boundary between the City Centre and the West End. It is managed by ScotRail and is served by trains on the North Clyde Line.

== History ==
Dating from 1886, it was originally part of the Glasgow City and District Railway, the first underground railway in Scotland, and as such the station is built below the surface of the surrounding streets. The station was built using the cut and cover method, with the original walls being visible on the open air section at the western end of the platforms. Nearby points of interest include Sauchiehall Street and the Mitchell Library, and the station (along with nearby Anderston - a stop on the Argyle Line), serves the city's financial district, making this station popular with commuters.

The original surface building of the station was located at the western end of the platforms, on North Street adjacent to the Mitchell Library, but in 1968 it was demolished due to it being in the path of the new Glasgow Inner Ring Road, and the surface access to the station was moved to its eastern end, with a new surface building constructed as part of the Elmbank Gardens office complex in 1971 - the building was designed by the Richard Seifert & Partners. In 1995 it received a minor refurbishment when lifts were provided down to platform level. The present station contains a staffed ticket office.

Under the Charing Cross Masterplan for the area unveiled by Glasgow City Council and the owner of Elmbank Gardens - London and Scottish Property Investments (L&SPI), the current surface buildings will be demolished and rebuilt as part of a new development which will see most of the surrounding 1970s-era office blocks demolished and the site redeveloped with new offices and student accommodation.

Automatic ticket gates have now been installed and came into operation on 3 June 2011.

In 2025, Charing Cross station was adopted by COWI through Scotrail's Adopt A Station programme. Raised beds and whisky barrel train planters were installed in June 2025 with volunteers from Alzheimer Scotland and St. Patrick's Primary School.

== Services ==
The service pattern, Mondays-Saturdays Daytime, is as following:

- 2tph Edinburgh to Milngavie
- 2tph Edinburgh to Helensburgh Central, semi-fast
- 2tph Airdrie to Balloch via Singer
- 2tph Cumbernauld to Dumbarton Central via Yoker
- 2tph Milngavie to Edinburgh, express
- 2tph Dumbarton Central to Cumbernauld
- 2tph Balloch to Airdrie
- 2tph Helensburgh Central to Edinburgh Waverley

Sunday service is:

- 2tph Edinburgh to Helensburgh Central
- 1tph Cumbernauld to Partick
- 2tph Helensburgh Central to Edinburgh
- 1tph Partick to Cumbernauld

Preceding station	National Rail	Following station
Glasgow Queen Street	ScotRail; North Clyde Line	Partick
	Historical railways	
Glasgow Queen Street; Line and Station open	Glasgow City and District Railway; North British Railway	Finnieston; Line open; Station closed

== Gallery ==
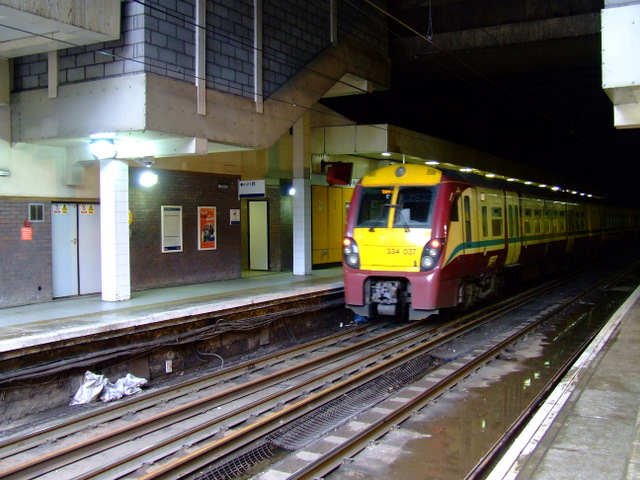
Class 334 at Charing Cross

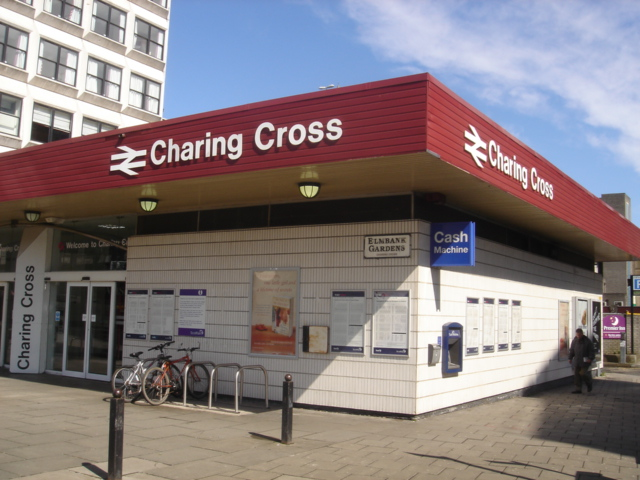
Charing Cross exterior in April 2008

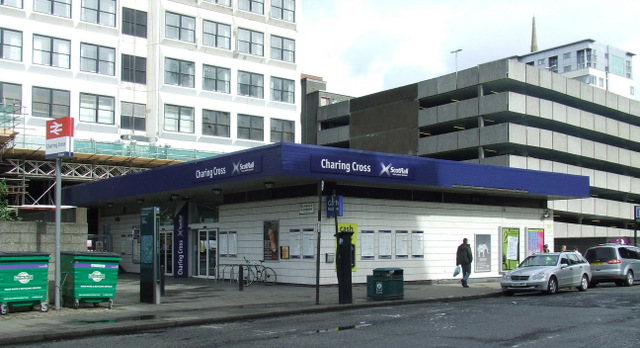
Current exterior of Charing Cross station

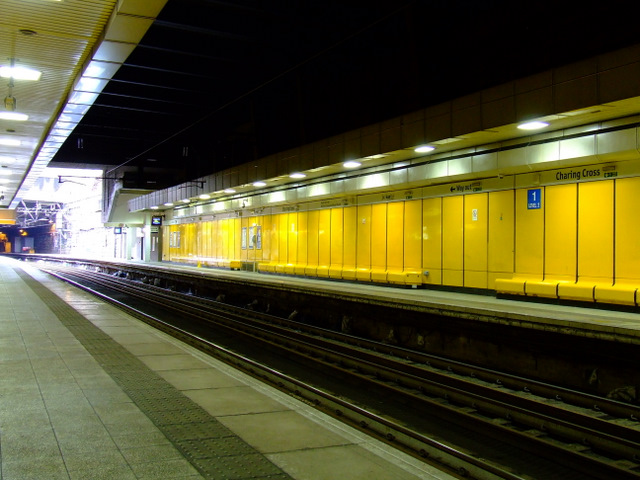
Platforms at Charing Cross

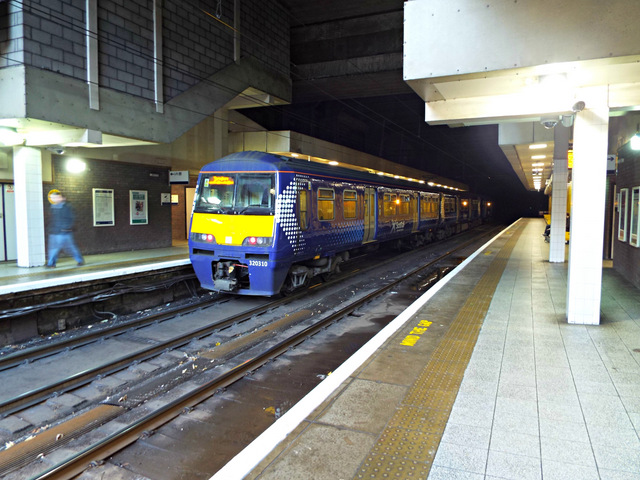
Class 320 at Charing Cross

== Bibliography ==
- Butt, R. V. J. (October 1995). The Directory of Railway Stations: details every public and private passenger station, halt, platform and stopping place, past and present (1st ed.). Sparkford: Patrick Stephens Ltd. ISBN 978-1-85260-508-7. OCLC 60251199. OL 11956311M.
- Jowett, Alan (March 1989). Jowett's Railway Atlas of Great Britain and Ireland: From Pre-Grouping to the Present Day (1st ed.). Sparkford: Patrick Stephens Ltd. ISBN 978-1-85260-086-0. OCLC 22311137.
