= Woodside, Glasgow =

Coordinates: 55.875111°N 4.274425°W

Woodside: Scots: Widside
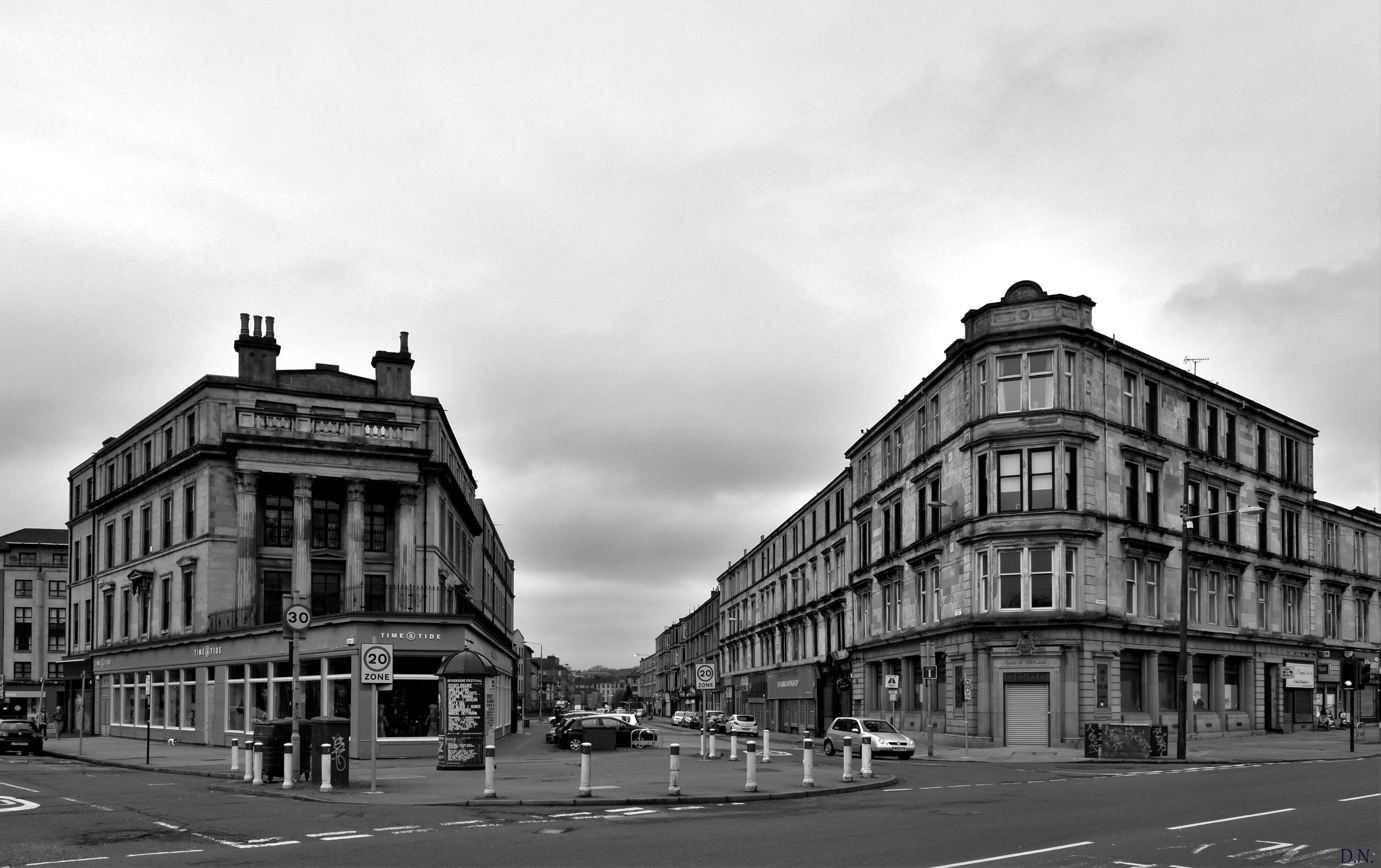
- Clarendon Place, view from St Georges Road.

- Location within Glasgow
- OS grid reference: NS578670
- Council area: Glasgow City Council
- Lieutenancy area: Glasgow
- Country: Scotland
- Sovereign state: United Kingdom
- Post town: GLASGOW
- Postcode district: G3; G4; G20 (part)
- Dialling code: 0141
- Police: Scotland
- Fire: Scottish
- Ambulance: Scottish
- UK Parliament: Glasgow North
- Scottish Parliament: Glasgow Maryhill; Glasgow

Woodside is a district in the Scottish city of Glasgow and also forms some of the most southern part of the much larger district of Maryhill. It is situated north of the River Clyde, between the River Kelvin and the Forth and Clyde Canal. The construction of the M8 motorway in the late 1960s severed Woodside from its southern neighbours Charing Cross and Garnethill.

== History ==
Woodside has the first and grandest of Glasgow's Carnegie libraries, all designed in the Edwardian Baroque style by James Robert Rhind. Joseph Connery, the father of Sean Connery, was born in the district in 1902.

The area's Public transport links include Kelvinbridge and St George's Cross Subway stations, and is also home to many small to medium-sized businesses, including Breast Cancer Care and Abbey Business Centres.

The Stockline Plastics factory explosion happened in Woodside on 11 May 2004, which killed nine people, (including two company directors) and 33 people were injured, 15 of them seriously. The four-storey building was largely destroyed.

== Gallery ==
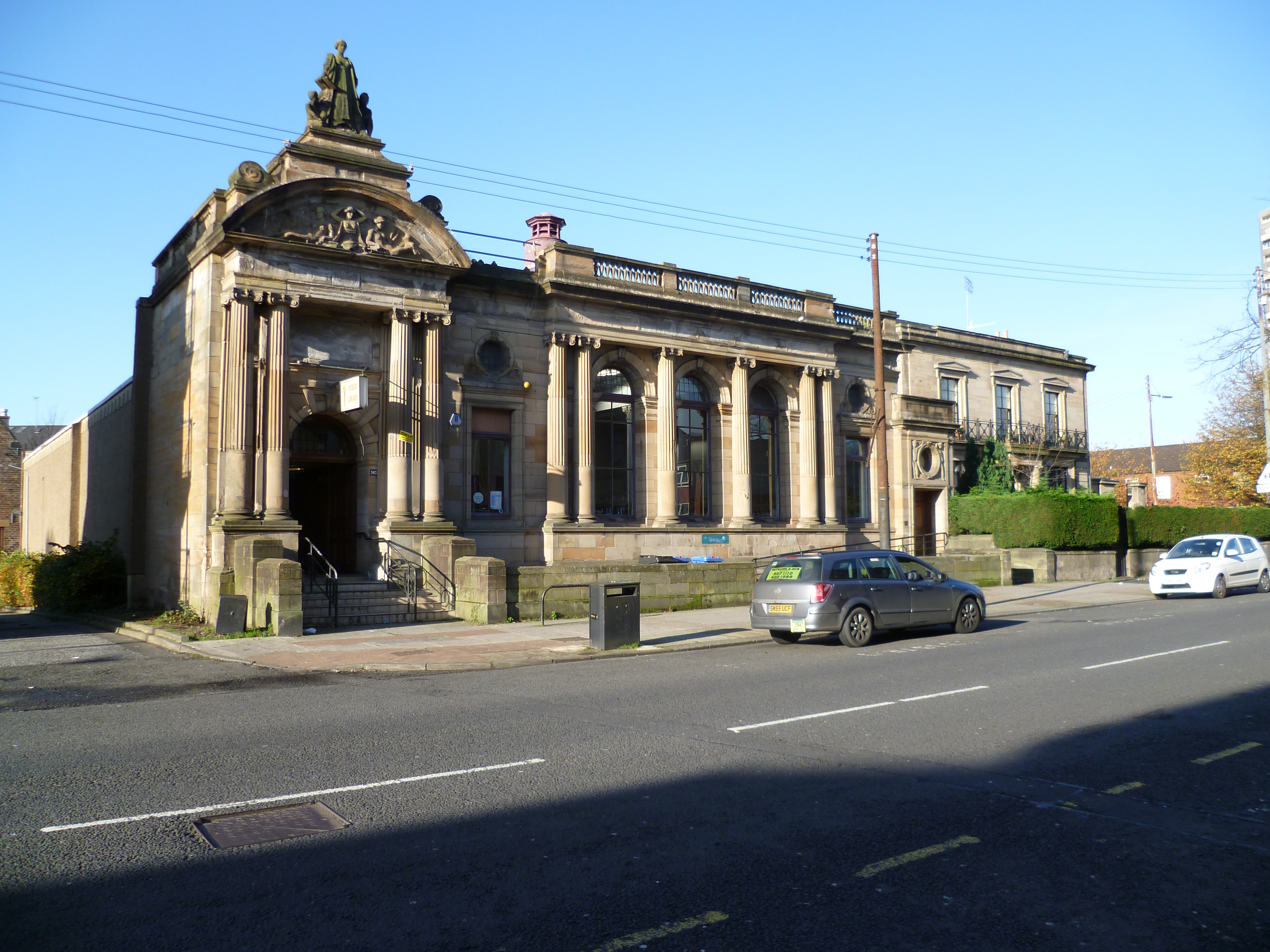
Woodside Library

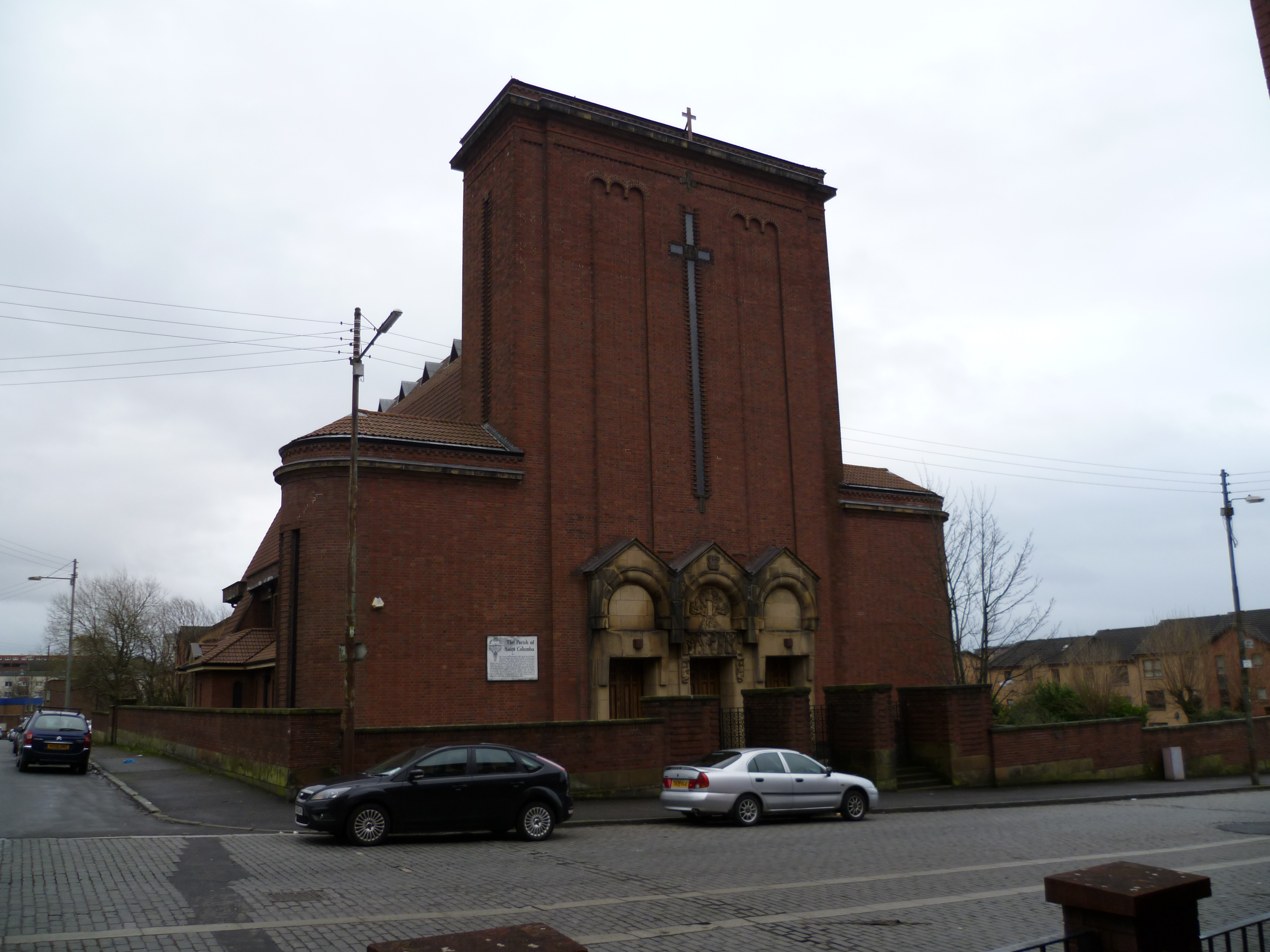
St Columba's Church

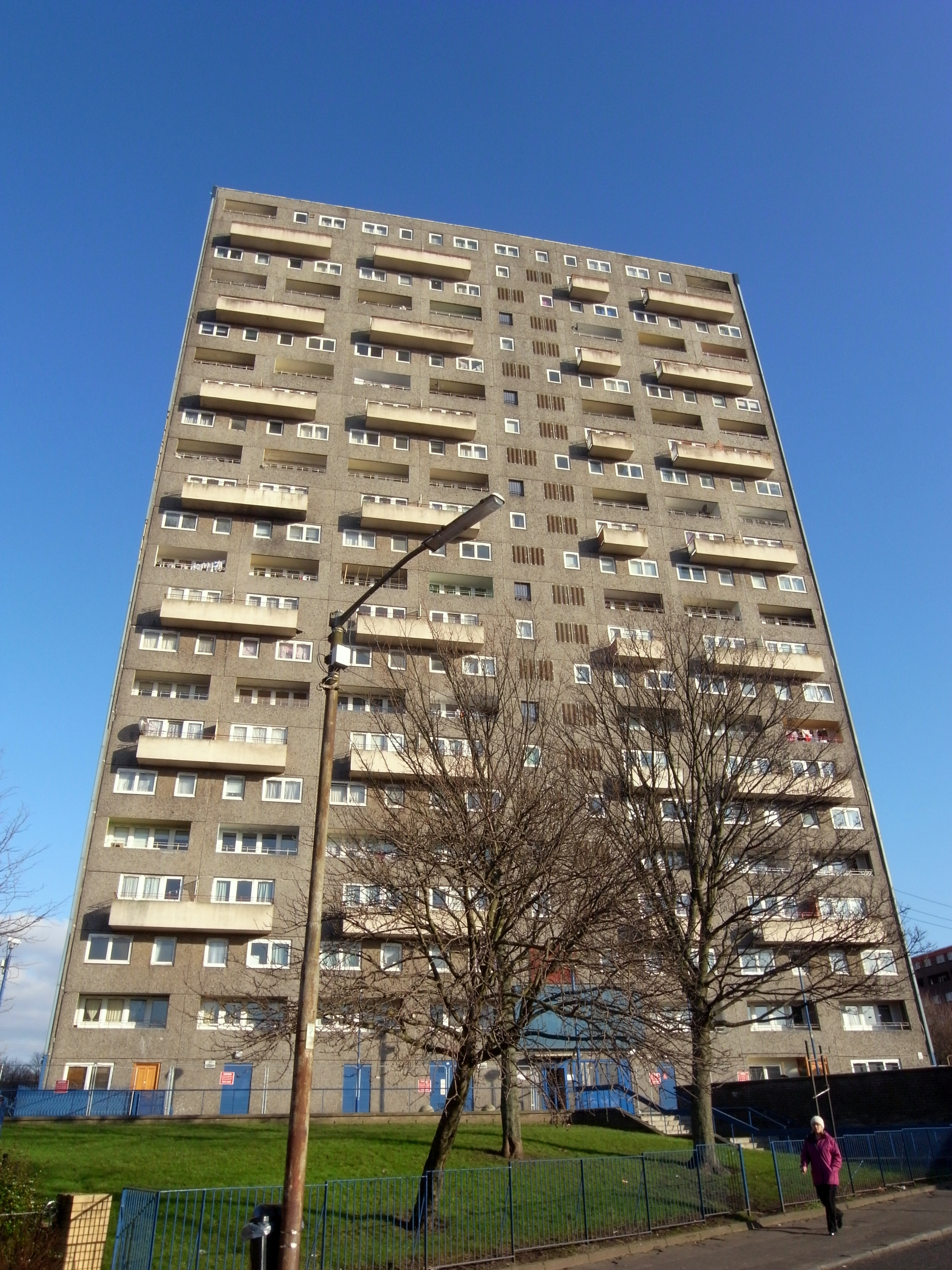
Torridon Court

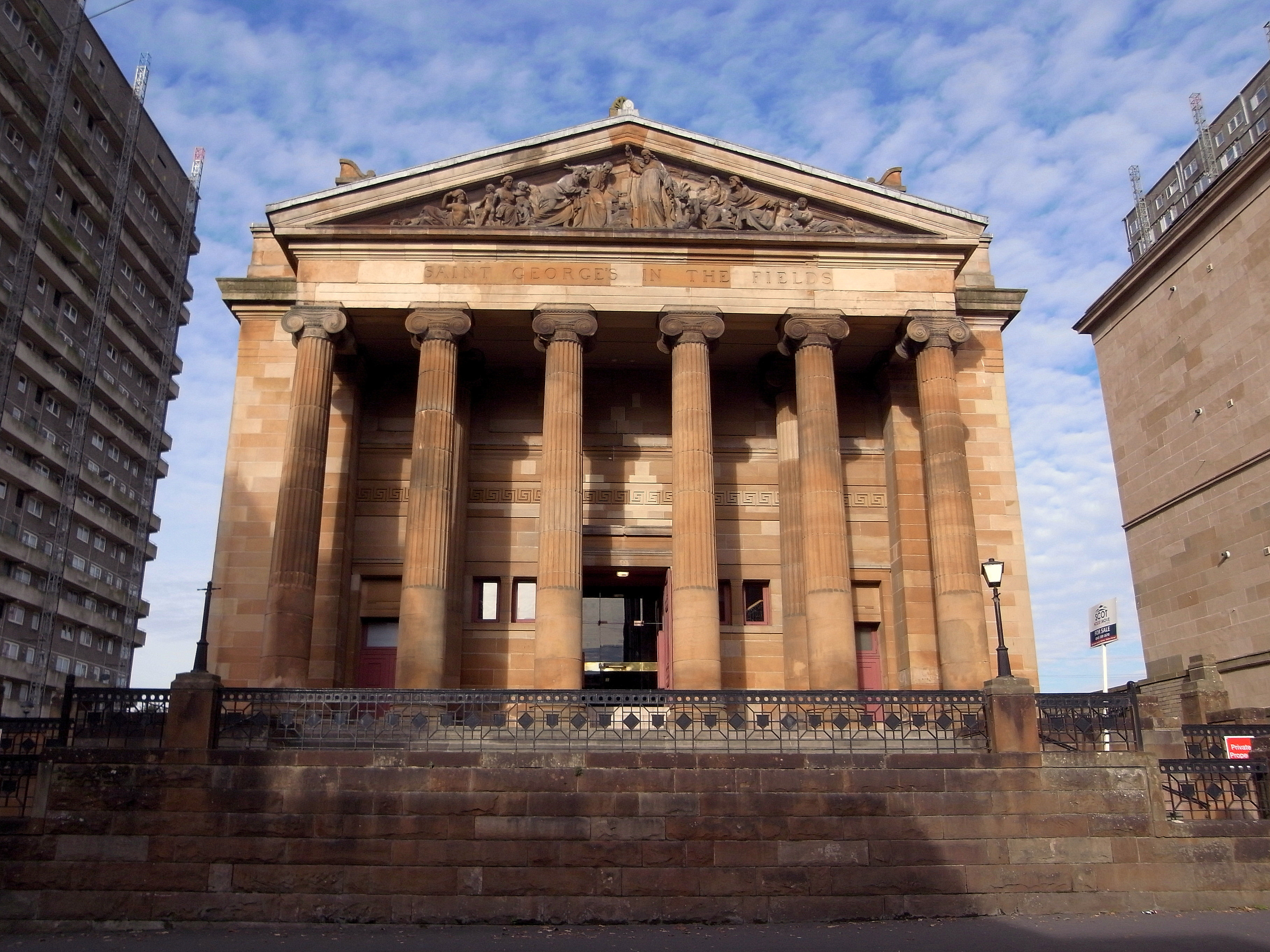
St George's in the Fields (1885-1886)

== See also ==
- Glasgow tower blocks
