= Bridge Street subway station =

Glasgow subway station

Bridge Street Sràid na Drochaid
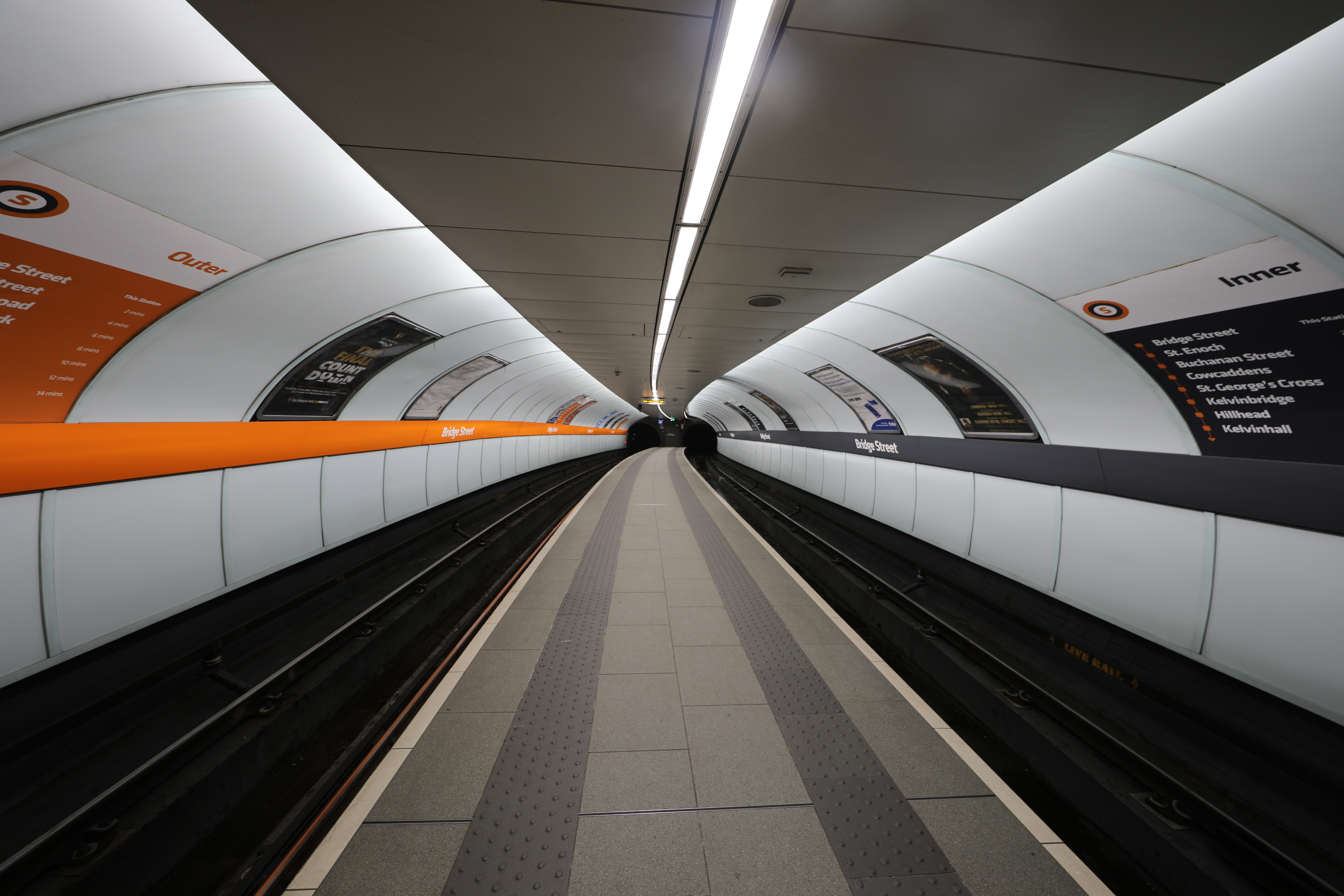

General information
- Location: 67 Eglinton Street; Laurieston, Glasgow, G5 9NR; Scotland
- Coordinates: 55°51′06″N 4°15′31″W
- Operator: SPT
- Transit authority: SPT
- Platforms: 2 (island platform)
- Tracks: 2

Construction
- Structure type: Underground
- Parking: Yes
- Cycle facilities: Yes (bike shed and bike hire)
- Accessible: No

Other information
- Fare zone: 1

History
- Opened: 14 December 1896
- Rebuilt: 16 April 1980; 46 years ago

Passengers
- 2018: ▲0.378 million
- 2019: 0.378 million
- 2020: ▼0.143 million
- 2021: ▲0.187 million
- 2022: ▲0.343 million

Services
Preceding station	SPT	Following station
St Enoch anticlockwise / inner circle	Glasgow Subway	West Street clockwise / outer circle
Location
Notes
- Passenger statistics provided are gate entries only. Information on gate exits for patronage is incomplete, and thus not included.

Bridge Street subway station (Scottish Gaelic: Sràid na Drochaid) serves Tradeston, Laurieston and the western fringe of the Gorbals in Glasgow, Scotland. It is the main interchange between the Glasgow Subway and buses travelling to and from the south side. It is the nearest subway station for the Citizens Theatre, O2 Academy Glasgow, Glasgow Sheriff Court Glasgow Central Mosque, as well as the Buchanan Wharf office and residential complex.

It was opened in 1896, and briefly acted as an interchange with the adjacent Bridge Street railway station on the Glasgow and Paisley Joint Railway before the latter was closed in the early 1900s. It was comprehensively modernised in 1977–1980 along with the rest of the Subway. The station retains its original island platform configuration.

== Past passenger numbers ==
- 2004/05: 0.470 million
- 2011/12: 0.397 million annually

== Gallery ==
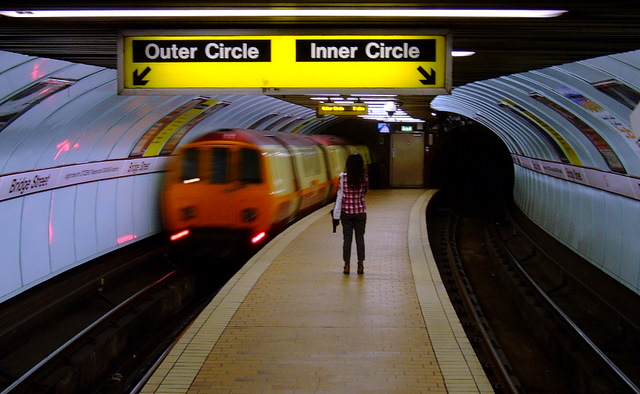
Train departing Bridge Street

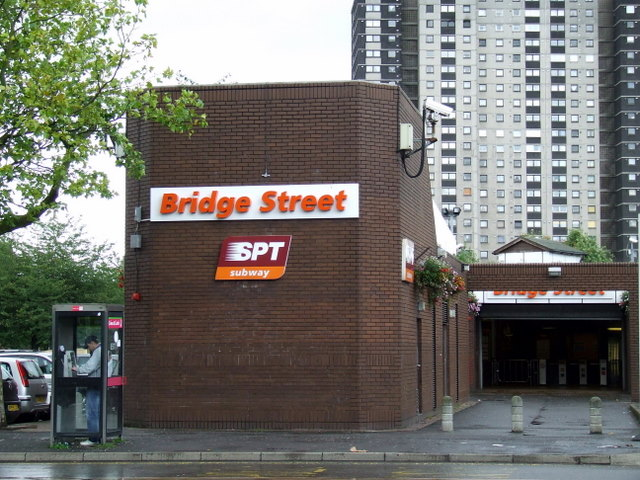
Station exterior in 2008

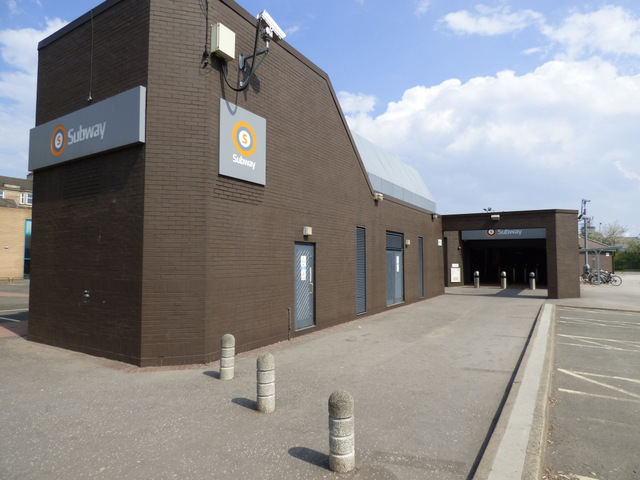
Current exterior of the station
