= Tradeston =

District of Glasgow, Scotland

Coordinates: 55°51′11″N 4°15′47″W

Tradeston: Scottish Gaelic: Bhaile Malairt; Scots: Tredstoun
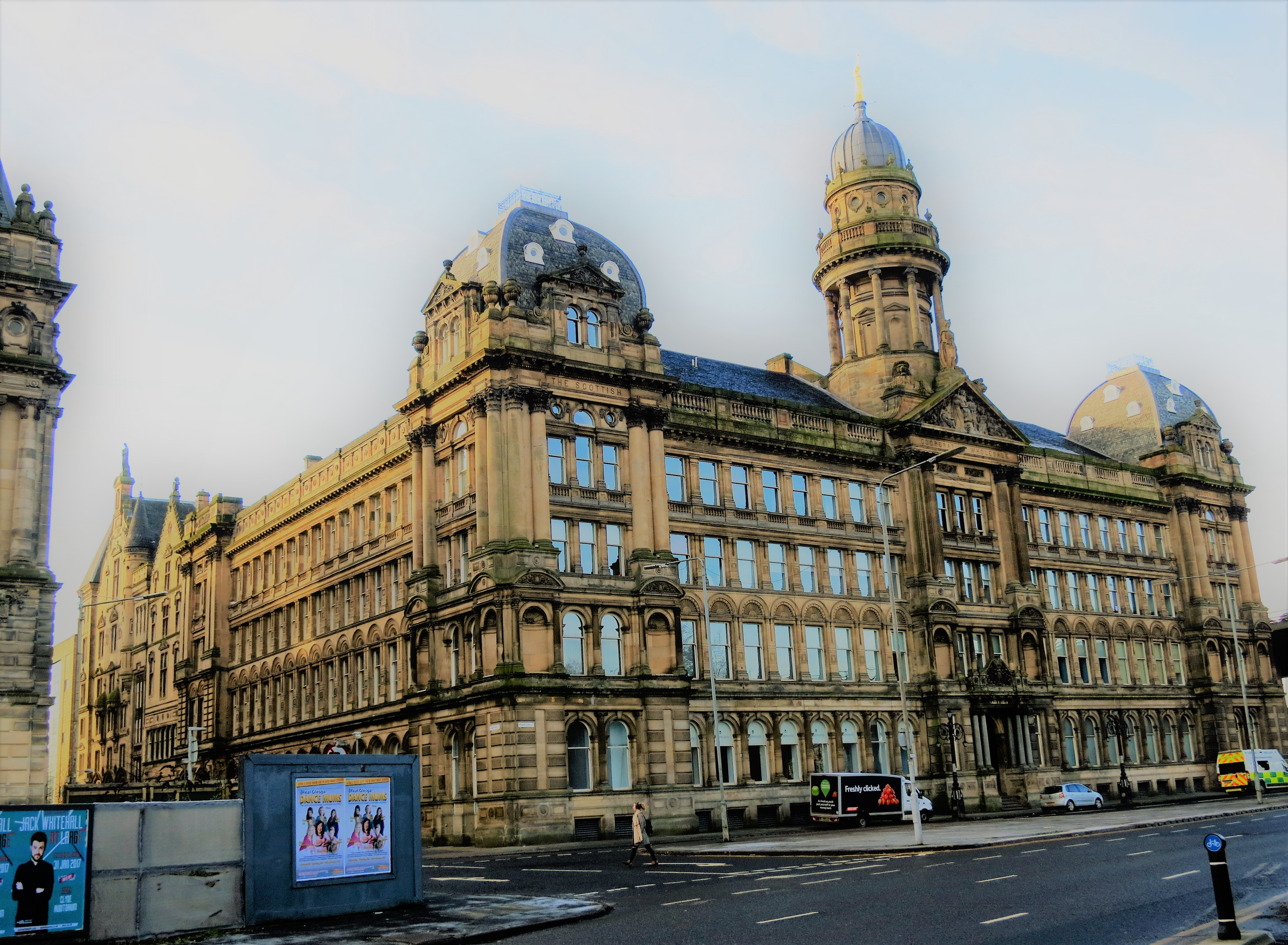
- The former Glasgow headquarters of the Co-Operative and Wholesale Society on Morrison Street - one of Tradeston's most famous landmarks

- Location within Glasgow
- OS grid reference: NS581660
- Council area: Glasgow City Council
- Lieutenancy area: Glasgow
- Country: Scotland
- Sovereign state: United Kingdom
- Post town: GLASGOW
- Postcode district: G5
- Dialling code: 0141
- Police: Scotland
- Fire: Scottish
- Ambulance: Scottish
- UK Parliament: Glasgow Central
- Scottish Parliament: Glasgow Southside

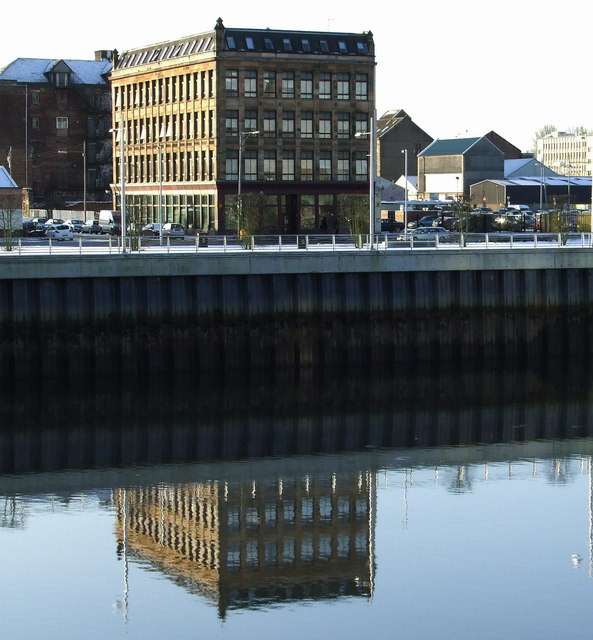
Kingston House, a riverside warehouse in Tradeston dating from 1878

Tradeston (Scots: Tredstoun) is a small district in the Scottish city of Glasgow adjacent to the city centre on the south bank of the River Clyde. The name (a portmanteau of "Trades Town") reflected its role as a primarily dockland area with a large number of warehouses and wharves along the riverside where vessels would be unloaded. It merges to the south and west with Kingston, and the two districts are often considered one and the same.

By the middle of the 20th Century, most of this had disappeared, although remnants of the area's thriving trading industry had survived in its high concentration of wholesaler businesses, some of which are still in operation into the 21st Century. Today, Tradeston has become increasingly gentrified, with the city centre's financial district now expanding over to the south bank, heralding the arrival of new office and residential developments.

== Geography ==
Tradeston borders with Laurieston and the Gorbals to its immediate east, Pollokshields to the south and Kingston to the west, therefore its notional boundaries are the River Clyde to the north, the Glasgow to Paisley railway line to the south, Eglinton Street and Bridge Street to the east and West Street to the west. The M74 Extension traverses the area.

The Tradeston Bridge, opened on 14 May 2009, links Tradeston and neighbouring Kingston with Broomielaw and the city's International Financial Services District for pedestrians and cyclists.

== Economy and Architecture ==
Tradeston's historical role as a centre for warehousing and trade is symbolised by its grandest and most famous building – 95 Morrison Street – which was constructed as Co-Operative House; the headquarters of CWS Scotland – a role which it maintained well into the late 20th Century. It was designed by architects Bruce and Hay and built between 1893–1897 as the head office of the Scottish Co-operative Wholesale Society. A famous urban myth persists that it was one of the rejected designs for Glasgow City Chambers which was constructed on George Square so similar are the two buildings' basic appearance. The building has since been converted for residential use.

Tradeston's role as a hub for trade continued well into the late 20th century, as a large number of wholesaler (Cash and Carry) businesses continued to be located in the area, although some of these have gradually closed down or have opened as retailers to the general public as a higher residential population has now moved into the area.

Many former industrial buildings in the area were demolished as part of the M74 Extension which opened in June 2011. Barclays Bank opened a new headquarters at the Tradeston waterfront on the River Clyde's south bank in 2021, expected to lead to thousands of new jobs and kickstart the regeneration of Tradeston as a whole. Known as Buchanan Wharf and managed by Stallan-Brand architects, the project consisted of replacing low rise industrial units with new office buildings and renovating two previously derelict listed 1870s warehouses, the BECO Building and Kingston House, for public use.

== Transport ==
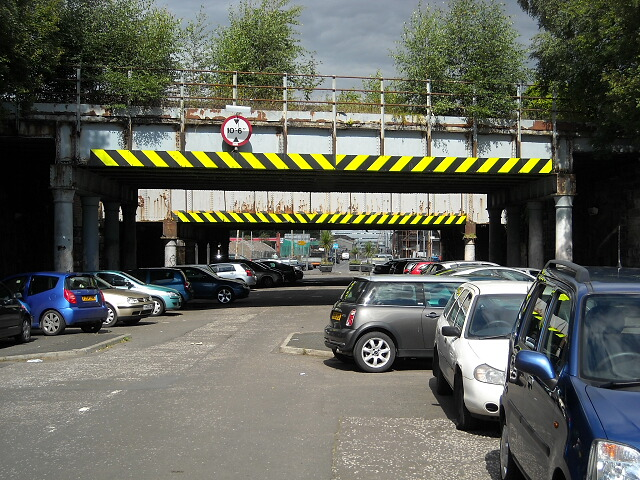
View of railway bridge on West Street into which a bus crashed into in 1994, killing five people (the foreground bridge's 10' 6" warning sign refers to the lower height of the background bridge)

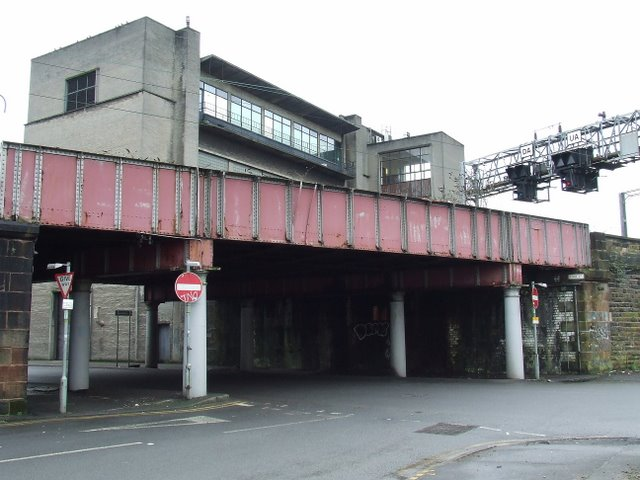
The bridge over Cook Street has been struck by buses on multiple occasions

Tradeston is served by the Glasgow Subway system at West Street and Bridge Street stations.

West Street station is the proposed location of a major new rail-subway interchange as part of the Crossrail Glasgow proposal. The area is traversed by several elevated railway lines, most of which converge to cross the Clyde on the Caledonian Railway Bridge leading into Glasgow Central Station.

The area was the scene of a tragedy in 1994 when a double-decker bus carrying a group of Girl Guides from the city's Drumchapel district crashed into one of the low rail bridges crossing West Street immediately adjacent to the subway station (the driver was unfamiliar with the route and was being led by a guide leader in a car); two 10-year-old girls, an 11-year-old girl and two adult supervisors were killed in the incident and 15 other children injured, six of them seriously. Similars incident occurred at another nearby low bridge on Cook Street in 2009 (on that occasion the bus was empty and returning to the depot), 2010 (again the bus was empty) and 2023 (ten people required hospital treatment).

== Industry ==
Tradeston was the site of another tragedy in 1872 when the Tradeston Flour Mills exploded killing 18 people who worked at the mills and people who worked or lived in surrounding buildings, and starting a fire that threatened Bridge Street railway station and ships docked on the River Clyde.
