= Elphinstone Tower =

Elphinstone Tower may refer to:

- Elphinstone Tower, Falkirk, a ruined tower house on the Dunmore Estate in central Scotland
- Elphinstone Tower (East Lothian)
- Elphinstone Tower, a tower of Stirling Castle
- Elphinstone Tower, a tower of Kildrummy Castle, Aberdeenshire

== See also ==
- Elphinstone Place, a proposed tower block in Glasgow, cancelled in July 2008
