= List of tallest buildings and structures in Glasgow =

Skyline of Glasgow
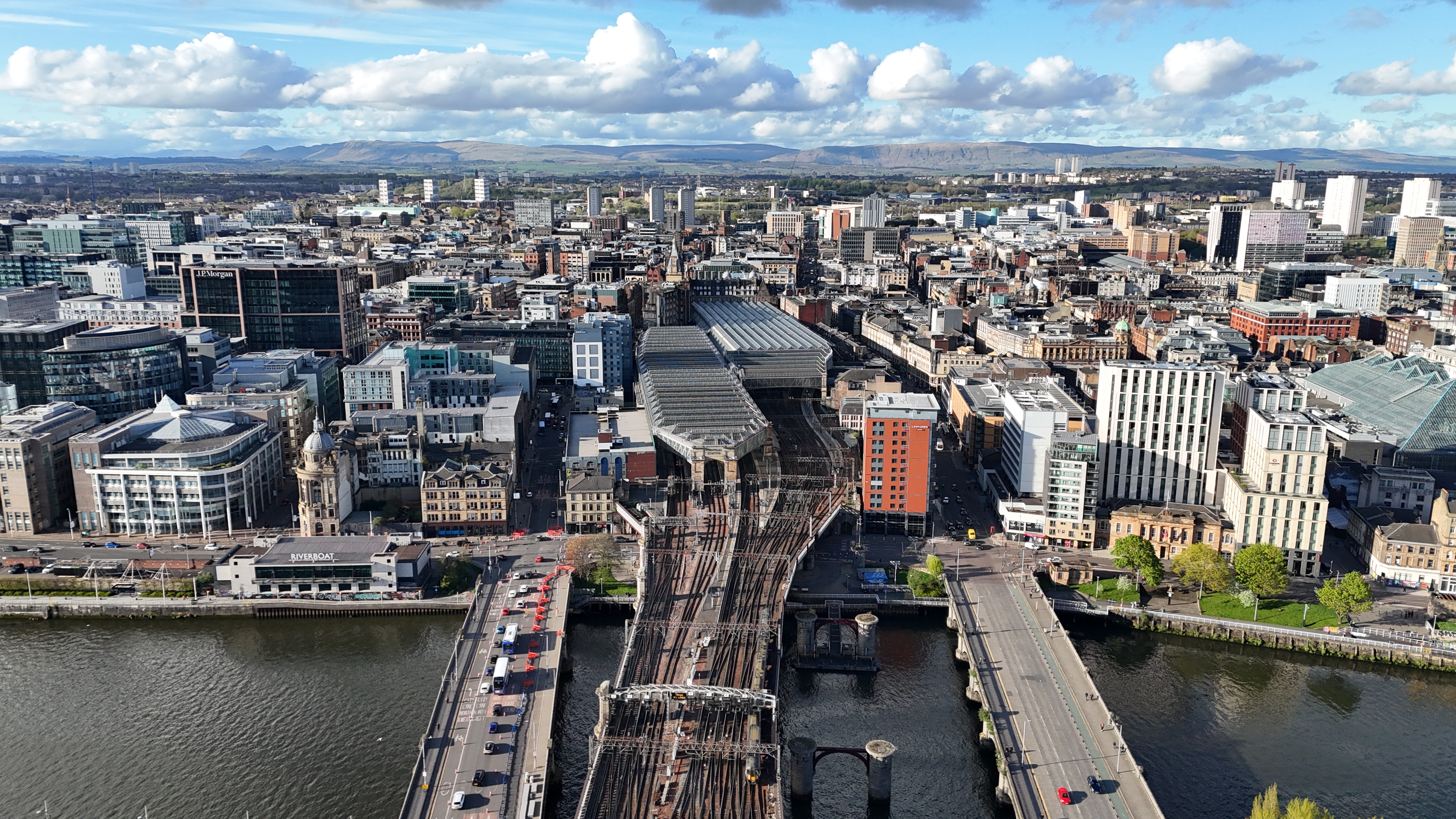
- Glasgow City Centre skyline in 2025
- Tallest building: Glasgow Tower (2001)
- Tallest building height: 127 m (417 ft)
- Tallest structure: Cathkin Braes Turbines (2013)
- Tallest structure height: 125 m (410 ft)
- Major clusters: Anderston; Charing cross International financial services district Buchanan wharf Merchant city West end Springburn; Maryhill; Townhead; Knightswood

Number of tall buildings
- Taller than 50 m (164 ft): 52

Glasgow, the largest and most populous city in the country of Scotland, has a number of mid rise skyscrapers and other high rise buildings ranging from residential towers, offices, hotels and observation towers which stand at least 40 m (131 ft) in height. The Ard at 36 stories (114m) is the tallest habitable building in Glasgow and in Scotland it is Scotlands first skyscraper. Another major project is the city wharf project at central quay and also other new skyscrapers to appear along lancefeild quay in anderston Glasgow’s major clusters of tall buildings across the city are primarily located across the central Glasgow districts of Anderston, Charing Cross, Merchant city, International financial services district, Townhead, Glasgow’s west end, and the Buchanan wharf, complex in tradeston, and also the suburban districts of Springburn, Maryhill, Knightswood, while the majority of Glasgows high rise form part of wider clusters one notable example is the Glasgow tower the tallest structure in the city and in Scotland at 127m located next to the Glasgow science centre complex in Glasgows media village on an old dock.

The current tallest structure in the city, at 127 metres (417 ft), is the Glasgow Tower, an observation tower within the Glasgow Science Centre. It holds a Guinness World Record for being the tallest tower in the world in which the whole structure is capable of rotating 360 degrees. The The Ard tower at 36 floors, 114m, is the city's and also Scotland tallest building. Meanwhile, four buildings in Springburn (the two western tower blocks of the Balgrayhill high-rise estate, and the two tower blocks at Croftbank Street) stand as the tallest 1960s tower blocks in Glasgow and Scotland at 78m, each with 26 storeys. The city's Cineworld building is currently the tallest cinema building in the world.

A number of new high rise developments are under construction in the city – The Ard (114 m (374 ft), City Wharf (87m (285 ft), 2 Central Quay (63 m (207 ft) and Vita India Street 61 m (200 ft). Upon completion, The Ard will become the tallest inhabitable building in Glasgow, whilst the Glasgow Tower will remain as the overall tallest structure. Glaswegian architect Andy MacMillan described Glasgow and its cityscape as being “Scottish in its stone, European in its urban pedigree, American in its grid iron plan and has a unique integrity and identity among the cities of the British Isles".

== History of Glasgow skyline ==
=== Pre-war ===
The first tall building to have been constructed in Glasgow, and considered Scotland's first skyscraper, was the 91 m (299 ft) tall Tait Tower in Bellahouston, built for the Empire Exhibition of 1938, but was later demolished the following year.

=== Post-war: 1954–1970 ===
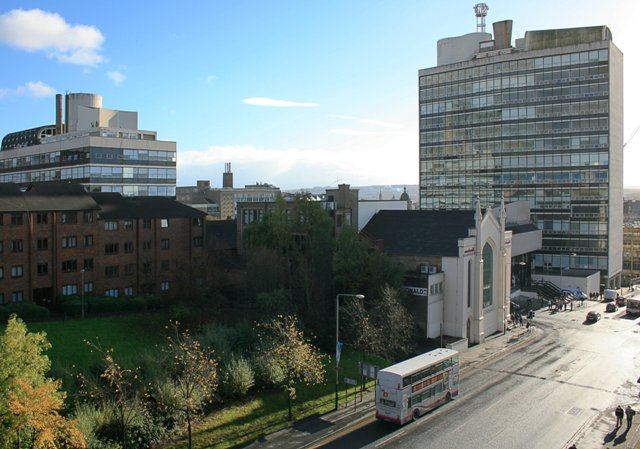
Glasgow College of Building and Printing, constructed in 1963 (now known as the Met Tower), was one of the first high rises to be built in the city centre.

The origin of Glasgow's high rise building "boom" of the 1960s and 1970s began with the publication of the Bruce Report in 1945, which was a set of proposals to address the city's chronic overcrowding and inner city decay through a comprehensive redevelopment of the city's inner area. The city's infamous slum districts would be knocked down, and their populations dispersed out to new housing estates located on the city's periphery. The city centre would also be completely rebuilt to a new design (on Modernist principles), but most of the report's ideas were rejected. The 10-storey Moss Heights in the city's Cardonald district were completed in 1954, and were effectively the first social housing tower blocks to be constructed in the city.

By the 1960s, Glasgow Corporation had identified a series of Comprehensive Development Areas (CDAs), where overcrowding and life-expired housing was at its most serious. In the end, 29 CDAs were created, the most infamous being the Gorbals, which the Corporation used as a "test bed" for various multi-storey housing developments in tower blocks at the turn of the 1960s. All of its tenement slums were destroyed, and replaced by high-rise schemes designed by prominent architects of the period such as Basil Spence and Robert Matthew.

The initial success of the Gorbals schemes then led onto the mass construction of other clusters of high rise tower blocks in various sites around the city, making Glasgow the first truly high rise city in Britain. Some of these "schemes" were planned suburbs, created from scratch - such as Red Road. Although the radical ideas for the city centre contained in the Bruce Report were not carried through, its influence was felt through the construction of a cluster of high rise office and educational buildings in the city centre during the early 1960s, such as St Andrew House, the Met Tower and the Livingstone Tower.

=== 1970–2001 ===
During the 1970s, Glasgow was considered to be the tallest city in Europe as a result of its number of high rise buildings, particularly tower blocks. During this period, it was known as the "high rise capital of Europe". In 1977, the corporation (or Glasgow District Council as it was now known) completed what would be the last social housing high-rise tower block at 22 Dundasvale Court in the Cowcaddens district, by which time the initial enthusiasm for high rise housing was waning. Many of the new estates had developed social problems due to the lack of amenities and the break up of long standing inner city communities, whilst poor quality construction and the innate unsuitability of prefabricated concrete construction methods in Glasgow's intemperate climate - some of the tower blocks developed severe issues with damp and other associated structural defects.

It would not be until 1988 that high-rises were built in the city once again, with the construction of the 17-storey Forum Hotel (latterly the Moat House International Hotel, and now the Crowne Plaza Hotel) next to the SECC. The 20-storey Hilton Hotel in Anderston followed in 1992. From the early 1990s, Glasgow City Council and its successor, the Glasgow Housing Association, have run a programme of demolishing the worst of the residential tower blocks, including Basil Spence's Hutchesontown C blocks in 1993.

Since the late 1990s, property developers have been planning new upmarket residential and office high-rises along the River Clyde, and in the city's financial district, which would far surpass existing buildings in height. Several proposed skyscrapers, such as Elphinstone Place which would have become the tallest in the city and in Scotland, were cancelled for financial reasons.

=== 2001–present ===
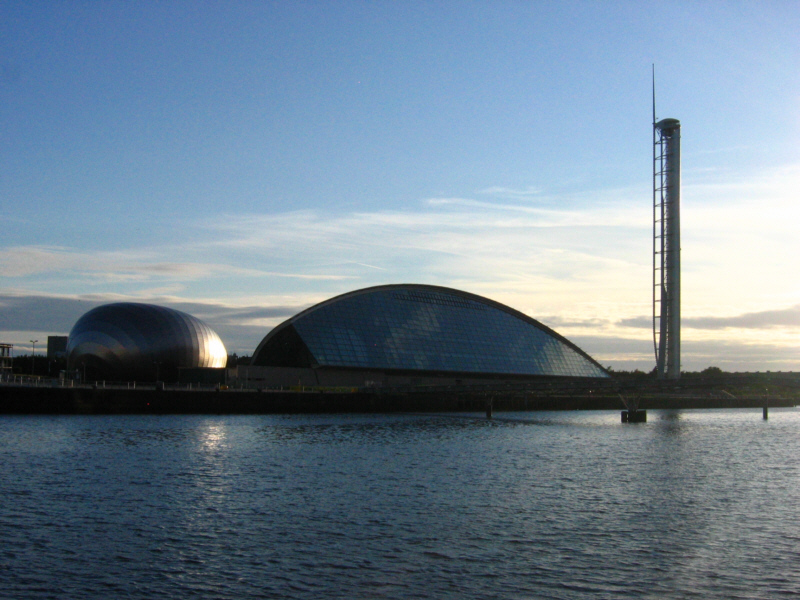
Glasgow Tower became the tallest structure in Glasgow upon completion in 2001, standing at 127 m (417 ft)

It was not until the opening of the Glasgow Tower (127 m (417 ft)) in 2001 that a structure surpassed the height of both the Red Road and Bluevale and Whitevale Towers. Glasgow Tower was considered a world first, mostly because of its "very innovative engineering structure that represents some of the best principles and applications of large-scale engineering design and construction". During build design and construction, a complex would typically have one or more prototypes created to "prove the design before constructing a production model". Given the scope of Glasgow Tower structure, this was deemed impossible and unachievable. As a result, the concept which had been created by designers "had to be proven in place" once the structure had been complete.

With the untested design, the Glasgow Tower initially had a number of issues following its completion, ranging from the lift to the observation deck getting stuck, as well as "strain on the thrust bearing". The original thrust bearing which had been used during the construction of the tower was found to be incompatible with the structure and was ultimately replaced. The tower is jacked up annually by "up to half a metre" using a total of four hydraulic jacks, allowing the bearing to "be inspected or removed if required". During the annual maintenance routine, the bearing of the tower also "receives a synthetic grease treatment which is injected under high pressure and works its way along the grease channels on the bearing" which is considered vital to ensure the tower continues to turn smoothly.

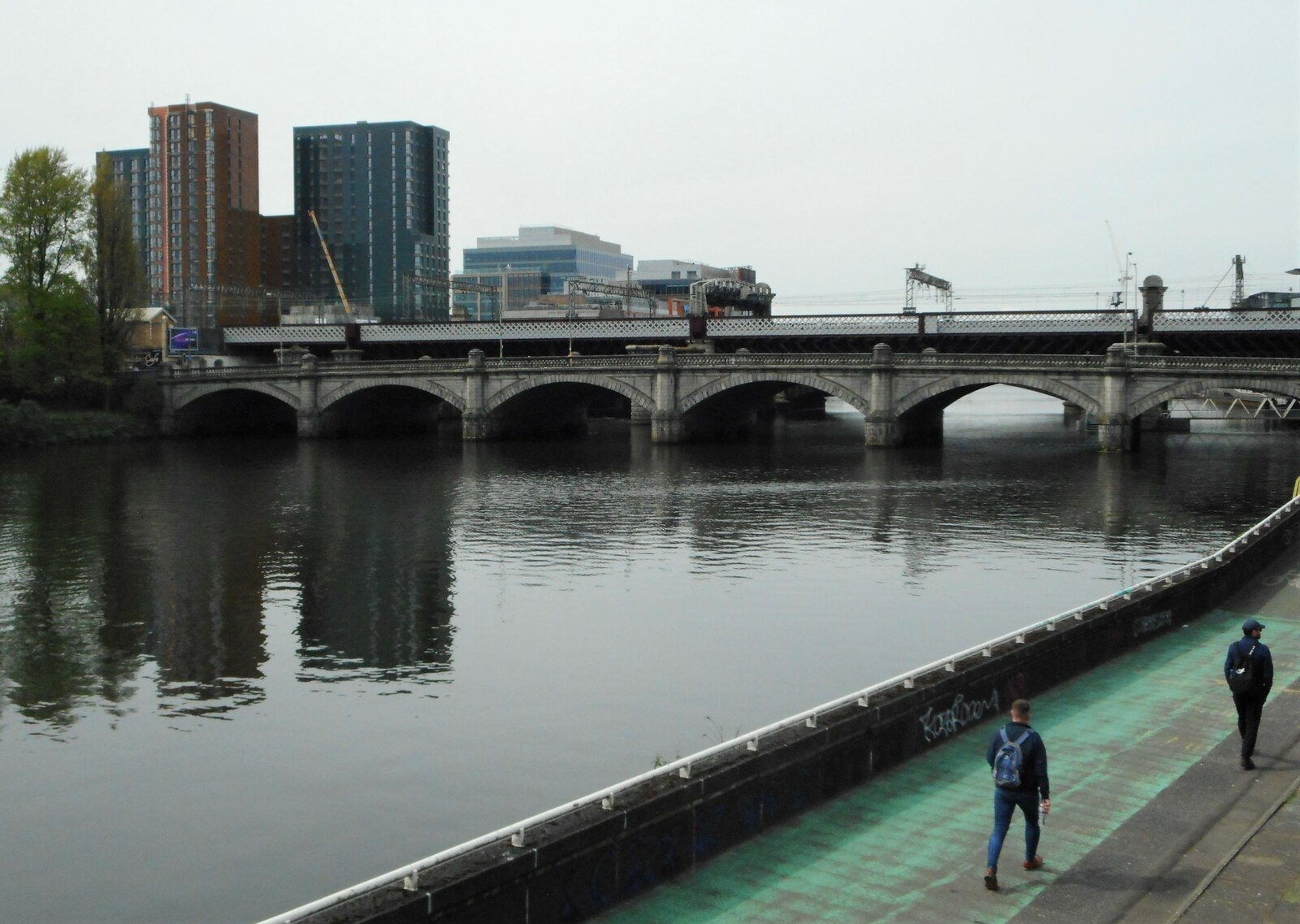
The Buchanan Wharf towers, standing at 54 m (177 ft)

In September 2001, the world's tallest cinema building, Cineworld Glasgow, opened and stands at 62 m (203 ft). Other notable skyscrapers to be constructed across Glasgow during the 2000s decade include the 62 m (203 ft) Argyle Building, and the Bridle Works Building. Recent developments during the 2010s and 2020s include the 58m tall Central Quay and Buchanan Wharf at 54m. The Ard was formally approved by Glasgow City Council in August 2024. The 36 storey, 114m tower will become the tallest habitable building in both Glasgow and Scotland upon completion.

In August 2024, construction began on City Wharf, a combination of student accommodation and BTR residential units, including a 28–storey 87 m (285 ft) tower, in the Anderston Quay area of the city. Plans were submitted to Glasgow City Council in April 2023 for "almost 1,000 homes" to be constructed on a "landmark location". The developer, Dandara Living, said that following "a series of public consultations", the company believed that their "application offers a terrific opportunity to create a development that reflects its unique and highly visible location".

In May 2023, Dandara Living altered the existing plans submitted to Glasgow City Council in order to seek planning permission to erect a memorial to commemorate the Cheapside Street whisky bond fire on 28 March 1960, a fire which cost 19 people their lives and is considered "to be the worst post-war fire services disaster". Upon its completion, the tower will become the second tallest building in Glasgow, surpassing the University of Glasgow Tower which stands at 85 m (279 ft).

By November 2026 The Ard tower surpassed the height of all other habitable buildings in Glasgow and in Scotland at 36 stories (114m) it marks the gateway between the west end and the city centre and is arguably Glasgow’s first skyscraper it can be seen from miles around and is a truly defining landmark within the Glasgow skyline from its top floor lounge you will be able to see as far as the Isle of Arran and Ben lomond and the hills of Perthshire

==== High-rise building policy ====
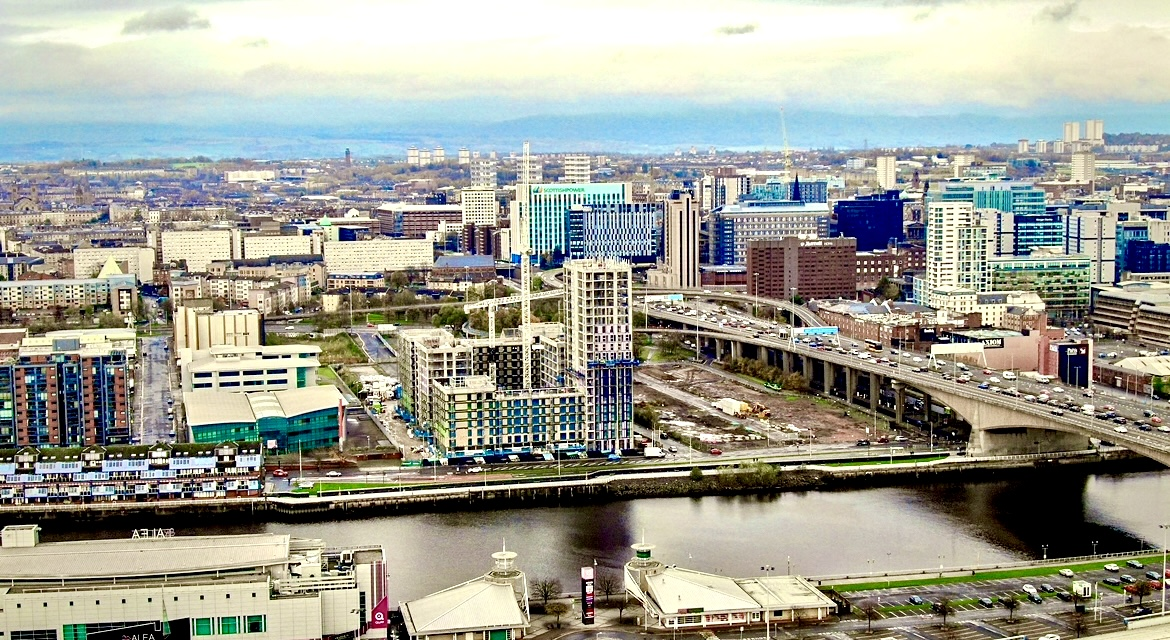
Glasgow City Centre skyline in September 2023

In 2024, Glasgow City Council carried out its first ever detailed consultation on its future high-rise building policy, publishing a "Tall Building Design Guide" in May 2025. The report still did not formally establish a definite height restriction, but merely established the areas where high rise construction in the city centre would be "least favourable" or "most favourable", and therefore most likely to be approved. The report highlighted a number of key areas:

- A formal definition of "tall", depending on the overall context of surrounding buildings. Three separate scales, known as 'Local', 'District' and 'Metropolitan' are defined:
  - Local: A building 2 times the height of the broader context (other structures within a 150m radius)
  - District: A building 2-3.5 times the height of the broader context (other structures within a 400m radius)
  - Metropolitan: A building 3.5 times or greater the height of the broader context (structures that can be seen city-wide from key vantage points such as the Campsie Fells or Cathkin Braes, in addition to the 400m context of "District" buildings)
- Within the existing Glasgow Central Conservation Area (GCCA), where the tallest structures are predominantly the spires and steeples of Victorian/Edwardian churches, permitted high rise development would be defined as "least favourable".
- Five clusters were identified where high rise construction (on the "Metropolitan" scale (above) would be "most favourable", these being Anderston/Charing Cross to the west, Cowcaddens to the north, Tradeston to the south, and Trongate along with the eastern side of High Street (bordering with the Ladywell/Dennistoun districts) to the east. These areas correlate approximately to where legacy high rise construction from the 1960s and beyond had already taken place.

== Cityscape ==
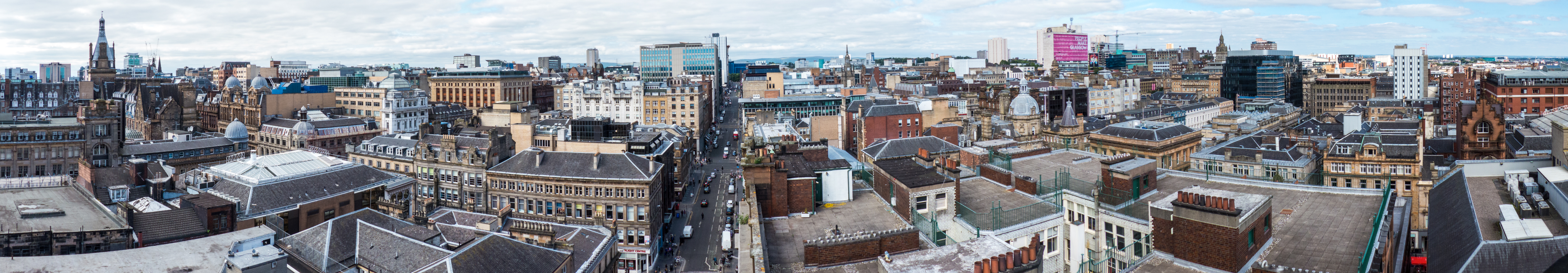
Panorama of Glasgow (Scotland) from the top of the Lighthouse, as shown in August 2015

== Tallest completed buildings and towers and structures ==
This list ranks externally complete Glasgow buildings and free-standing structures that stand more than 50 metres (164 ft) tall, based on standard height measurement. This includes spires and architectural details but does not include antenna masts. An equals sign (=) following a rank indicates the same height between two or more buildings. The "Year" column indicates the year in which a building was completed.

=== Tallest buildings ===
Rank	Name	Image	Height	Coordinates	Floors	Year	Primary use	Notes
1	Glasgow Tower		127 m (417 ft)	55.859248°N 4.296229°W	2	2001	Observation tower	The Glasgow Tower does not have floors continuously from the ground, and therefore the Council on Tall Buildings and Urban Habitat does not consider it to be a building. The tower holds a Guinness World Record as the tallest tower in the world in which the whole structure can rotate 360 degrees.
2	The Ard		114 m (374 ft)	?	36	2028	Mixed	Tallest habitable building in Scotland due for completion in Q3 2028 the towers rising lift core surpassed the height of all other buildings in Glasgow and Scotland as of November 2026 at the height of 28 floors
2	Glasgow University Tower		85 m (279 ft)	55.871348°N 4.288641°W	?	1887	University	The city council recognise the Glasgow Tower as a free standing structure, therefore, the accolade of tallest building in Glasgow goes to the University Tower. Along with the City Chambers, it remains only one of two representations from the Victorian era that remain in a list of the 30 tallest buildings in Glasgow
3	Met Tower		74.7 m (245 ft)	55.8634°N 4.2463°W	15	1964	Academic	Former Glasgow Metropolitan College Building, it was the first tower block built for tertiary education in Scotland. The building is a Category B-listed modernist concrete framed building, with roof elements similar to those of Le Corbusier.
4=	22 Viewpoint Place		74 m (243 ft)	55.891233°N 4.229900°W	26	1964	Residential	Located in Springburn.
4=	42 Viewpoint Place		74 m (243 ft)	55.891233°N 4.229900°W	26	1964	Residential	Located in Springburn.
4=	15 Croftbank Street		74 m (243 ft)	55.883351°N 4.224550°W	26	1964	Residential	Located in Springburn.
4=	250 Edgefauld Road		74 m (243 ft)	55.883351°N 4.224550°W	26	1964	Residential	Located in Springburn.
8	Glasgow City Chambers		73 m (240 ft)	55.860957°N 4.248511°W	4	1889	Government Building	
9=	2 Taylor Place		72 m (236 ft)	55.864951°N 4.244064°W	25	1967	Residential	Located in Townhead.
9=	15 Grafton Place		72 m (236 ft)	55.864951°N 4.244064°W	25	1967	Residential	Located in Townhead.
9=	12 Dobbie's Loan Place		72 m (236 ft)	55.864951°N 4.244064°W	25	1967	Residential	Located in Townhead.
9=	7 St. Mungo Place		72 m (236 ft)	55.864951°N 4.244064°W	25	1967	Residential	Located in Townhead.
9=	178 Balgrayhill Road		72 m (236 ft)	55.891233°N 4.229900°W	25	1964	Residential	Highest man-made point above sea level within Glasgow city boundary. Located in Springburn.
9=	198 Balgrayhill Road		72 m (236 ft)	55.891233°N 4.229900°W	25	1964	Residential	Highest man-made point above sea level within Glasgow city boundary. Located in Springburn.
15	St. Andrew House		71 m (233 ft)	55.864571°N 4.254194°W	18	1964	Hotel	Converted to a Premier Inn hotel in 2012. The rooms on the 18th floor are the highest hotel rooms in the city.
16	Hilton Glasgow		70 m (230 ft)	55.861378°N 4.269345°W	20	1992	Hotel	The Hilton Hotel was part of an influx in tall building developments across the city in the 1990s along with developments including the Crowne Plaza Hotel and Cineworld Glasgow
17	1 Meadowside quay square		69 m (226 ft)		19	2006	Residential	Built as part of the Glasgow harbour development it is the tallest building in the development standing at 19 floors it is a prominent point within Partick west
1=	*4 tower blocks at Sandyhills; *5 tower blocks at Knightswood (Kirkton Avenue); *3 tower blocks at Cowcaddens		69 m (226 ft)		22–24	Various	Residential	
30	Bridle Works Building		68 m (223 ft)	55.862945°N 4.251771°W	20	2021	Student accommodation	The building was named in honour of Joan Eardley, a Glasgow School of Art graduate who had a studio in the area and who was famed for her paintings of oxen and horses. The building's aesthetic deliberately mimics elements of the 1960s Met Tower which stands diagonally opposite.
31=	Anniesland Court		66 m (217 ft)	55.891020°N 4.325166°W	24	1968	Residential	Tallest listed residential building in Scotland. Only tower block to have a Category A listing in Glasgow. Located in Anniesland.
31=	*3 tower blocks at Woodside; *3 tower blocks at Kennishead		66 m (217 ft)		23	Various	Residential	
38	JP Morgan Tech Hub		65 m (213 ft)	55.858540°N 4.261883°W	14	2023	Office	
39	Love Loan		64 m (210 ft)	55.861888°N 4.247525°W	20	2024	Hotel/Student Accommodation	
40=	*2 tower blocks at Dumbreck; *2 tower blocks at Pollokshaws; *1 tower block at Ibrox; *1 tower block at Drumchapel		63 m (207 ft)		22	Various	Residential	
46=	Omniplex Glasgow		62 m (203 ft)	55.865115°N 4.254955°W	16	2001	Cinema	Tallest cinema complex in the world.
46=	Argyle Building		62 m (203 ft)	55.859477°N 4.267824°W	20	2008	Residential	
48=	*3 tower blocks at Maryhill (Glenavon Road); *1 tower block at Whiteinch		61 m (200 ft)		21	Various	Residential	
52	Queen Elizabeth University Hospital		60 m (200 ft)	55.861973°N 4.341239°W	14	2015	Hospital	
53	Block H2 – Central Quay		58 m (190 ft)	55.858559°N 4.2746137°W	20	2022	Residential and retail	Part of Central Quay development
54	Crowne Plaza Glasgow		55 m (180 ft)	55.860028°N 4.290414°W	17	1989	Hotel	Part of the SECC.
55	Buchanan Wharf Towers		54 m (177 ft)	55.854265°N 4.261100°W	19	2023	Mixed use	Part of Buchanan Wharf development
56	Elmbank Gardens		53 m (174 ft)	55.865018°N 4.269737°W	15	1973	Hotel	Originally an office block, converted to a hotel in 1995.
57	Livingstone Tower		52 m (171 ft)	55.860974°N 4.243464°W	17	1965	University	Part of the University of Strathclyde.

=== Other notable tall structures ===
Buildings with a Wikipedia article and over 50 metres in height.

Name	Image	Height	Coordinates	Floors	Year	Primary use	Notes
Cathkin Braes wind turbine		125 m (410 ft) (Note: including rotating blades with 45 m (148 ft) length); 80 m (260 ft) (Note: base 'hub' unit only.)	55.797467°N 4.215594°W		2013	Wind turbine	
Glasgow Cathedral		68.6 m (225 ft)	55.862978°N 4.234668°W		1197	Cathedral	
St Andrew's West Church		67 m (220 ft)	55.865206°N 4.266865°W		1852	Church	
Websters Theatre		66.5 m (218 ft)	55.874513°N 4.278454°W		1863	Theatre (Note: Converted from church)	
St Columba Church		61 m (200 ft)	55.862774°N 4.266768°W		1904	Cathedral	
St Mary's Cathedral		60.5 m (198 ft)	55.873397°N 4.275077°W		1893	Cathedral	
Cottiers Theatre		59.5 m (195 ft)	55.874025°N 4.301741°W		1866	Theatre (Note: Converted from church)	
Finnieston Crane		53 m (174 ft)	55.858217°N 4.284492°W		1931	Cantilever crane	

== Tallest under construction or approved ==
=== Under construction ===
Name	Height metres / ft	Floors	Year (est.)	Primary Use	Location	Notes
The Ard	114 m (374 ft)	36	2026–27	Student Accommodation	Blythswood Hill	Upon completion, The Ard will become the tallest inhabitable building in both Glasgow and Scotland upon completion, but will be the second tallest structure in Glasgow and Scotland behind the Glasgow Tower.
2 Central Quay	63 m (207 ft)	21	2027	Mixed Use	Anderston	In June 2024, Glasgow City Council approved planning permission which would create 409 residential flats in three buildings and accommodation for 934 students in one building, as well as 11 commercial units at Central Quay.
Vita India Street	61 m (200 ft)	19	2027	Student Accommodation	Anderston	The building will replace the former Strathclyde Regional Council office and will accommodate 591 Vita Student studio apartments.
184 Sauchiehall Street	56 m (184 ft)	18	2028	Student Accommodation	City Centre	Replacing the former M&S building.

=== Approved ===
Name	Height metres / ft	Floors	Year (est.)	Primary Use	Location	Notes
Dandara 'The Stores'	87 m (285 ft)	28	2026	Residential	Anderston Quay	Upon its completion, Block C of the development will become the second tallest building in Glasgow after the 114m Ard tower (currently under construction), surpassing the University of Glasgow Tower which stands at 85m (279 ft).
138 Hydepark Street	87 m (285 ft)	26	2027	Student Accommodation	Anderston Quay	Approved
Carrick & Brown	74 m (243 ft)	24	2028	Student Accommodation	City Centre	Approved
58 Port Dundas Road	70 m (230 ft)	21	2028	Residential	Cowcaddens	Approved
Moda Lancefield Quay	67 m (220 ft)	21	2028	Residential	Lancefield Quay	Approved
144 Port Dundas Road	65 m (213 ft)	19	2028	Residential	Cowcaddens	Approved
70-72A Waterloo Street	59 m (194 ft)	19	2028	Student Accommodation	Cowcaddens	Approved

== Unbuilt ==
Name	Height	Floors	Year	Notes
East One	180 m (590 ft)	55		The tower would have consisted of 196 residential flats, leisure, commercial space and a 96-bed hotel over a space of 12 floors, 100 flat perimeter block and 2 levels of underground parking incorporating 420 spaces.
Cheapside Tower 1	170 m (560 ft)	50		A development comprising three towers: 1, 2 and 3. Each tower would have had accommodation over 50 floors.
Cheapside Tower 2	170 m (560 ft)	50		A development comprising three towers: 1, 2 and 3. Each tower would have had accommodation over 50 floors.
Cheapside Tower 3	136 m (446 ft)	50		A development comprising three towers: 1, 2 and 3. Each tower would have had accommodation over 50 floors.
Elphinstone Place	134 m (440 ft)	39		Cancelled due to the 2008 Financial crisis. Now the site of the new Scottish Power HQ. At 39-stories the structure would have been the tallest building in both Glasgow and Scotland. The building would have been situated at the western end of Blythswood Hill on the edge of Glasgow's financial district (IFSD).
Elmbank Tower	107.5 m (353 ft)	28		
Glasgow Harbour Tower	93 m (305 ft)	30		
Elphinstone Urban Village Tower 1	81 m (266 ft)	27		
Graving Docks Tower 1	65 m (213 ft)	21		
Elphinstone Urban Village Tower 2	60 m (200 ft)	20		

== Demolished ==
Name	Image	Height	Coordinates	Floors	Year built	Year demolished	Notes
Townsend Chimney		138 m (453 ft)	55.8712°N 4.2514°W	N/A	1859	1928	At J. Townsend Chemical Works, Port Dundas. Tallest chimney in the world from 1859 to 1889.
Tennant's Stalk		133 m (436 ft)	55.8702°N 4.2346°W	N/A	1842	1922	At the St Rollox Chemical Works, Springburn. Tallest chimney in the world from 1842 to 1859. Demolished after being struck by lightning.
Pinkston Power Station cooling tower		94 m (308 ft)	55.8723°N 4.2472°W		1952	1976	Largest cooling tower in Europe at time of completion. Complex in Port Dundas (providing energy for the Glasgow Corporation Tramways) also included two 263 ft (80 m) chimney stacks.
Tait Tower		91.4 m (300 ft)	55.8455°N 4.3181°W	?	1938	1939	Built as part of the 1938 Empire Exhibition.
Bluevale and Whitevale Towers (2)		90.8 m (298 ft)	55.8559°N 4.2155°W	30	1968	2015	109 Bluevale Street and 51 Whitevale Street. Tallest inhabitable buildings in Scotland from time of completion to time of demolition. Located in Gallowgate.
Red Road Flats (6 - 'point' blocks)		89 m (292 ft)	55.8803°N 4.2082°W	31	1967	2015 (Note: 2013 for Birnie Court.)	21 Birnie Court, 33 Petershill Drive, 63 Petershill Drive, 93 Petershill Drive, 123 Petershill Drive and 10 Red Road Court. Tallest residential buildings in Europe at the time of completion. Located in Balornock / Barmulloch.
Wyndford Road towers (4)		78 m (256 ft)	55.8874°N 4.2955°W	26	1964	2025	120 Wyndford Road, 151 Wyndford Road, 171 Wyndford Road, 191 Wyndford Road. Located in Wyndford (Maryhill).
Red Road Flats (2 - 'slab' blocks)		78 m (256 ft)	55.8800°N 4.2068°W	28	1967	2015 (Note: 2012 for 153-213 Petershill Court.)	10-30 Petershill Court, 153-213 Petershill Court.
Clydesdale Bank Tower		73 m (240 ft)	55.8589°N 4.2951°W	1	1987	1989	Built for the Glasgow Garden Festival, later moved to Rhyl in Wales.
Royston "B"		72 m (236 ft)	55.8676°N 4.2239°W	25	1967	2016 (Note: 1992 for 240 Roystonhill, 2013 for 20 Rosemount Street.)	240 Roystonhill, 20 Rosemount Street, 40 Rosemount Street. Located in Royston. 240 Roystonhill was the first tower block in Glasgow to be demolished in 1992.
Gorbals towers (10)		69 m (226 ft)		24	Various	Various	Four slab blocks at Laurieston (Norfolk Court), two blocks at Sandiefield Road, four blocks at Hutchesontown (Caledonia Road). Located in the Gorbals.

== See also ==
- Glasgow tower blocks
- List of tallest buildings and structures in Edinburgh
- List of tallest buildings and structures in Scotland
