= The Ard =

- 2024 architectural illustration of The Ard

General information
- Status: Under construction
- Architectural style: Modernist
- Location: 13 India Street, Glasgow, Scotland, G2 5AD
- Coordinates: 55.863382°N 4.268906°W
- Construction started: 31 October 2024
- Estimated completion: Q3 2028

Height
- Height: 114 m (374 ft)

Technical details
- Floor count: 36

Design and construction
- Architecture firm: Watkin Jones Group (Initial); Hawkins\Brown (Final)

The Ard (Scottish Gaelic: An Àrd, meaning "high"), is a 36-storey mid rise skyscraper under construction in the Charing Cross area of Glasgow, Scotland. The tower is planned to top out at 36 stories (114m) and, as of November 2026, has surpassed the height of all other buildings in Glasgow and Scotland to become the city and country’s tallest building. The development defines Glasgow's skyline and creates a landmark gateway between the City Centre and the West End. The development was formally submitted to Glasgow City Council in 2021 by Watkin Jones Group, with the original proposals seeking to construct a 33-storey "co-living" development in Glasgow City Centre. New plans submitted in 2023 saw the removal of one of the original proposed towers, and the reduction in size to a 30-storey tower. In December 2023, an updated plan was submitted, proposing a 35-storey building rising to 114 m above ground level. The final plans, consisting of a 36-storey student accommodation tower, were approved by Glasgow City Council in August 2024.

Slated for completion in the third quarter of 2028, The Ard will become the tallest habitable building in Glasgow and Scotland, surpassing the Balgrayhill tower blocks in the city's Springburn area, although the 127 m (417 ft) Glasgow Tower will remain as the tallest free standing structure in both Glasgow and Scotland. The Ard will also have the highest habitable floor count of any structure previously constructed in the city; that title having previously been held by the now-demolished Red Road Flats which topped out at 31 storeys. As of November 2026, the tower has surpassed the height of all other buildings in Scotland to become the tallest building in Scotland

== Background ==
=== Portcullis House ===
The original structure to stand on the site was known as Portcullis House, and was a Brutalist style office building constructed in 1971 as HM Revenue & Customs Glasgow government offices, as well as other governmental and public sector organisations. It stood opposite a complex of adjoining office blocks (the others being the now-demolished Nye Bevan House and Clive House) which housed much of the headquarters of Strathclyde Regional Council before its dissolution in 1996. Various schemes to build a high rise tower in the area had been proposed before – for example in 2004 a 39-storey mixed used tower known as Elphinstone Place was intended to stand on the site of the old SRC buildings but the plan was abandoned following the 2008 financial crisis, and the footprint eventually used for the new headquarters of Scottish Power in 2012.

=== Development plans ===
Early development plans of the site included a hotel, however, plans were scrapped and the building was put up for sale in August 2020, with Glasgow City Council submitting a failed bid to buy the site. A developer, later known to be Watkin Jones Group, purchased the site and existing building.

Watkin Jones Group purchase of the site at India Street in Glasgow was finally completed by October 2020 for an undisclosed sum. The development would mostly consist of both living accommodation as well as student accommodation facilities, with proposals for Class 3 food and drink services also operating from the site.

=== Planning difficulties ===
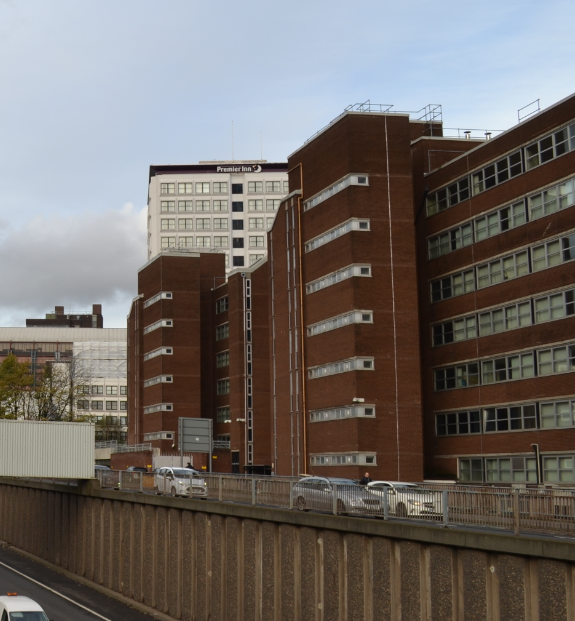
Portcullis House, pictured in 2022 before its demolition, with the M8 motorway running below, and the hotel tower of Elmbank Gardens in the background

In June 2023, Scottish Construction Now announced that the development was currently "on hold", with a spokesperson claiming the proposals were placed on temporary hold "due to a lack of policy or guidance from the council upon which planning applications for co-living could be assessed". However, that same month, it was reported that developers, Watkin Jones Group, launched a second round of consultations regarding the project development, referring to the development as a "vertical city". Working with architecture firm Hawkins\Brown as well as Harrison Stevens landscaping architects, the recent plans propose high-rise student accommodation on the site, with the potential of incorporating part of the existing structure to reduce and minimised embodied carbon.

=== Approval and construction ===
In August 2024, the final plans for the project were approved by Glasgow City Council. The structure was approved under the final name of The Ard. (the word àrd being the Gaelic translation of "high" or "lofty") The finalised proposals proposed as 36-storey, 114 m student accommodation tower. Hawkins/Brown will be the main contractor for the construction of the tower.

On 31 October 2024, scaffolding firm JR Scaffold erected scaffolding on the site to partially demolish the existing Portcullis House to make way for the construction of The Ard.

As of 12 June 2025, Glasgow City Council approved the use of stage one piling of the tower structure, officially commencing the construction work of The Ard. By February 2026, the main elevator/stair core of the tower was emerging from ground level.

== Design ==
The 2021 proposal for the tower, which was later withdrawn

The development at Portcullis House aims to be a major part of the Glasgow City Centre regeneration strategy. The development project outlines its vision for the development, saying that it seeks to "incorporate high-quality design, materials and construction methods from an early stage, ensuring the building is designed for a long life span and can be re-used in the future".

Despite previous planning applications aiming to demolish Portcullis House completely, there had been consideration given to retaining part of the building and incorporating it into construction design and proposals to "help reduce the embodied carbon of the new development". An application for prior approval of the partial demolition of the existing Portcullis House on the site was approved by Glasgow City Council on 18 February 2021. Demolition works began in the Spring of 2024, where the northern part of the building was completely removed; the second phase commenced in October 2024 where the remainder will be stripped out so that the concrete frame can be repurposed for inclusion into The Ard.

The proposed ground floor of the development would be designed to complement the already established and existing streetscape as well as public space improvements around the area. The developer said that "Uses at ground floor will help activate the streets around the building to bring vibrant new activity to this part of the City Centre, enlivening the frontage to the M8, creating more of a sense of place around Charing Cross Station and re-establishing this as a people-centric part of the city. Throughout the upper floors of accommodation, there is a mix of both en-suite cluster rooms and individual studios giving a good variety of accommodation choice for students throughout the height of the scheme". The revised proposal for the tower submitted in 2023 incorporates sky gardens and amenity spaces on the 9th, 20th and 35th floors, which are double height.

== Impact ==
Historic Environment Scotland raised no objections to the development of Portcullis House, stating that the proposed development and demolition of the existing Portcullis House government office building "raises no historic environmental issues in the national interest". Transport Scotland also made no objections to the proposals, but did highlight recommendations to the developer such as no means of direct access to the Trunk Road either pedestrian or vehicular, no drainage connections to the trunk road drainage system, no advertising signage visible from the Trunk Road Network, and, other recommendations relating to the transportation of construction materials and traffic management around the site.

NATS objected to the proposals and began to investigate mitigation measures which had been approved by stakeholders. NATS objected the proposal development, and argued that no construction shall begin until a Radar Mitigation Scheme has been agreed with the operator and approved via writing by the local authority planning department. Additionally, NATS argued that given the proposed elevation and characteristics of the building, it increased the risk of the building reflecting radar energy and giving false radar readings to aircraft from nearby radar targets given the buildings "obstructed line of sight". In September 2021, NATS confirmed they were fully engaged with the applicant to identify and design a technical solution in form of modification to the existing NATS radar to prevent mitigation of radar reflections from the building. Glasgow Airport also raised concerns and initial objections to the development on the grounds of aerodrome safeguarding perspectives, stating that the development could conflict with safeguarding criteria at the airport and required a more detailed assessment to be carried out to detail the potential impact on the airports operations.

Other agencies, including Scottish Power, objected the plans, claiming that that proposals are contrary to the city development plan, the development will cause significant, unacceptable impact on Scottish Power's operations, and the lack of consideration given to existing Scottish Power services already at the site. Network Rail stated no objections to the development, but did highlight recommendations which would be required to be met such as construction work not commencing until a construction method statement, which includes plant details, locations and lifting plans, is submitted to the Planning Authority for approval and agreed in conjunction with Network Rail's Asset Protection Engineers, details of any proposed piling works must be submitted to the Planning Authority for approval and agreed in conjunction with Network Rail's Asset Protection Engineers. Track / structure monitoring may be required during any proposed piling works, and also highlighted consideration to be given to the electrified railway adjacent to the site, the demolition of the existing Portcullis House and ensuring it does not impact on the safe delivery of rail services and no additional loading or surcharge placed on both the Finnieston and Charing Cross tunnels by the proposed development and that all proposed works adjacent to the tunnels must be subject to further discussions and agreement with Network Rail.

== See also ==
- City Wharf, contemporaneous nearby project of similar height
