= Savoy Centre Towers =

- 2009 proposed design plan issued by PBN Holdings Ltd.

General information
- Status: Never built
- Location: 140 Sauchiehall Street, Glasgow, Scotland, G2 3DH
- Estimated completion: Unknown

Technical details
- Material: Copper cladding with clear glazing and planar system
- Size: 0.4084ha
- Floor count: 31
- Floor area: 36,353 sqm

Design and construction
- Architecture firm: PBN Holdings Ltd.

Savoy Centre Towers is a proposed 110 m (360 ft) mixed use skyscraper located at 140 Sauchiehall Street, Glasgow, Scotland. Planning application for the £80 million development was submitted to Glasgow City Council in 2009 by Belfast based firm PBN Holdings Ltd., and plans were approved by Glasgow City Council in July 2010 subject to various grants and conditions. The proposed floor count of the structure is 31 storeys, with PBN Holdings Ltd. seeking to build 20 more storeys onto the existing 11 storey Savoy Shopping Centre.

== Background ==
The site is home to the Savoy Shopping Centre, an 11 storey building in which developers PBN Holdings Ltd. seek to construct another 20 storeys on top of the existing structure to create a structure with 31 floors overall, with the building being mixed use. In the official planning application documents submitted to Glasgow City Council, the developers intended the development to be used as a shopping centre including offices, leisure and entertainment facilities available.

The development firm, PBN Holdings Ltd. is based in Belfast, Northern Ireland. The developers claimed that they hope to construct a 221 bedroom hotel, office space and two restaurants within the Savoy Centre complex, one on the 30th floor of the tower with panoramic views of Glasgow City Centre.

== Development and construction ==
Formal notification was given to neighbouring properties on 21 April 2009 for the development of the structure to begin. A decision was made by Glasgow City Council on 26 July 2010 to approve the development, but the planning authority department of the council had issued a number of subjects and conditions that were to be met by the developer should the construction and development of the structure go ahead. The council issued a condition that the development must be constructed in accordance with the provided drawing and elevation numbers as the drawings submitted constituted the approved development. Further conditions for the development include an assessment of the impact that emissions will have in the air from or associated with the development, including from construction road transport, construction and demolition, carried out by a method agreed by the planning authority shall be submitted to and approved in writing by the planning authority. Before any work on the site can begin, the council requested for a comprehensive site investigation for ground contamination to be submitted and approved in writing by the planning authority. Restrictions were also given to lighting in association with the development.

Additional subjects and conditions associated with the planning application decision related to noise pollution from the development, the correct disposal of cooking odours and fumes from the towers restaurant facilities, the refusal to allow roller shutters anywhere on the development, security details submitted to the planning authority and the refusal to allow for canopies to be erected on the building.

The overall development proposal for the Savoy Centre Towers was considered to be in accordance with the Development Plan of Glasgow City Council, and the council claimed that there were no material considerations which outweighed the proposal's accordance with the Development Plan.

== Impact ==
As part of the planning application process, consideration had to be given by the developers to a number of various agencies as to how the development of the site could impact on local services and amenities. Strathclyde Partnership for Transport claimed that they saw no concerns and had "no comments" on the proposed development at the site. The Transportation Department at Glasgow City Council found that the proposed development was in line with the local and national transportation planning policy given the developments location within the city centre of Glasgow, claiming they were "more than satisfied" that the centralised location of the development gave ample opportunities for the public to access other methods of transportation other than private car usage.

The Ministry of Defence was asked to consider any implications the proposed development would have on the agencies safeguarding processes at nearby MOD Holehead. The department issued no objections to the development and was satisfied that the development would not affect the safeguarding procedures established at the Holehead site. Scottish Power objected to the proposals due to the fact that Scottish Power Energy Networks had an operational substation and cabling within the vicinity of the proposed development. Scottish Power Energy Networks said that they received no intimation as to whether the development at the site would affect their apparatus already on site and nearby.

No objections to the development were raised by the then Strathclyde Fire and Rescue Service or the West of Scotland Archeology Service.

== See also ==
- List of tallest buildings and structures in Glasgow
