= Central Quay =

Central Quay Cidhe Mheadhain
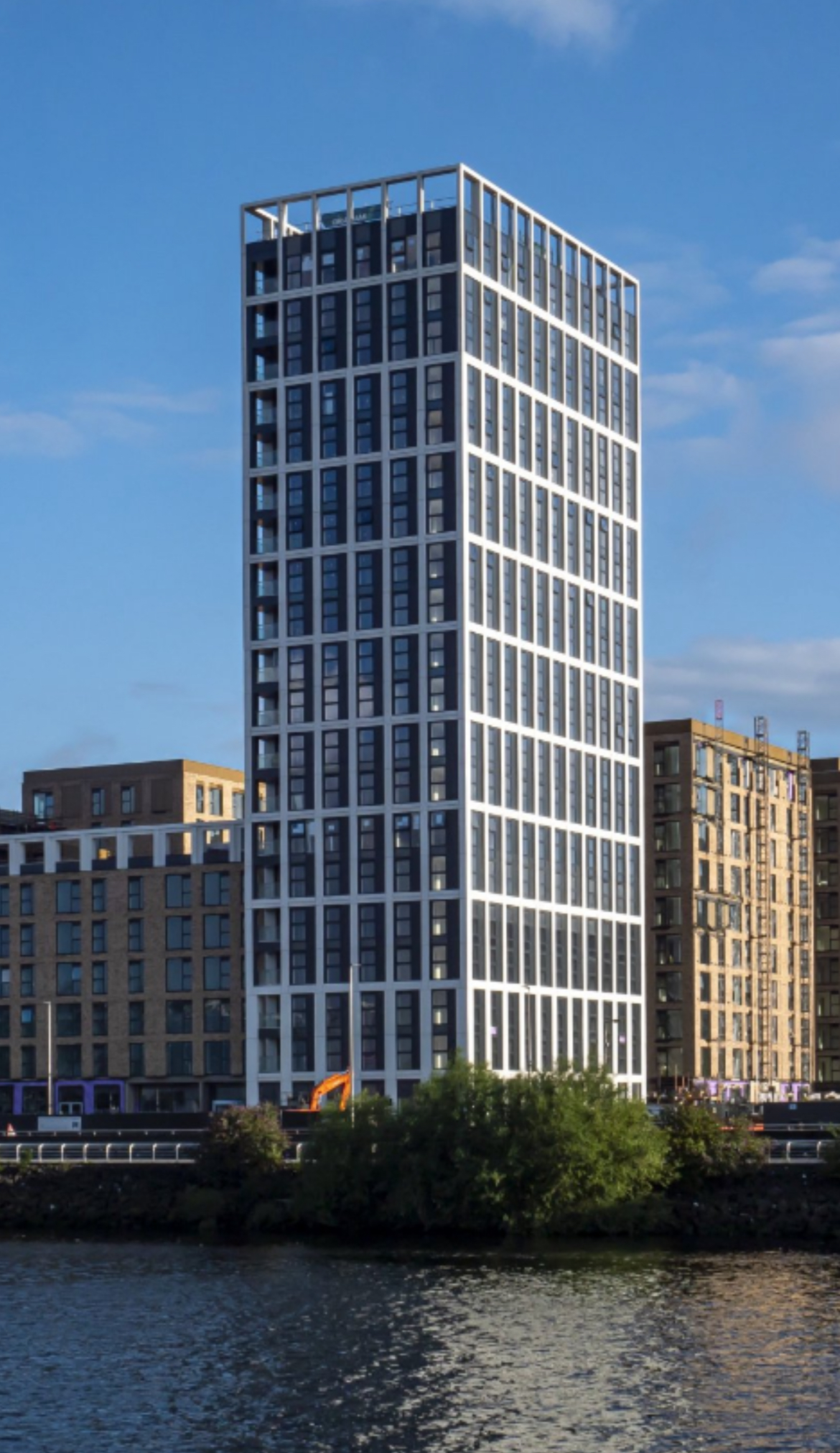
- Block H2, the tallest building at Central Quay
- Interactive map of the Central Quay; Cidhe Mheadhain area

General information
- Architectural style: Modernist
- Location: 89 Hydepark Street, Glasgow, Scotland, G3 8BW
- Coordinates: 55.858559°N 4.2746137°W
- Construction started: 2021
- Topped-out: July 10, 2022
- Completed: 2024
- Cost: £100 million
- Owner: XLB Property

Technical details
- Size: 58m
- Floor count: 20
- Floor area: 34,000sqm

Design and construction
- Architecture firm: Keppie Design; LDA Design

Central Quay (Scottish Gaelic: Cidhe Mheadhain) is a mixed use development at 89 Hydepark Street, Glasgow, Scotland. Consisting of four buildings, the tallest structure, Block H2, is one of the tallest buildings in Glasgow, standing at 58m tall and consisting of 20 storeys.

== Proposals and development ==
An application for planning permission was first submitted to Glasgow City Council on 29 September 2016 by development company Keppie Design, with a further two amended planning applications being submitted in 2017 The application for planning permission specified the description of the development as being a mixed use development which would include offices, residential units, hotel and associated ground floor commercial uses with access, parking, landscaping and associated works at Central Quay, Glasgow. The site in which the development was proposed for had laid vacant in the Brownfield area of Glasgow for some time, and the Central Quay site was historically part of a wider network of Victorian industrial buildings that dominated the wider Anderston and Cheapside areas Glasgow City Council planners approved the application on 27 November 2017, and had granted permission with 31 conditions attached to the application. Some of the conditions instructed to Keppie Design from Glasgow City Council included specified drawings submitted as part of the application to be adhered to, the requirement for assessing the impact of local air quality due to construction works and conditions relating to the pedestrian and vehicular access to the site were attached.

The proposals for Central Quay to be a mixed usage development were found to be in line with Glasgow City Council's vision. The development would see the creation of a "large quantity" of office space and the introduction of 24/7 usage mixed tenure residential development. A total of eight blocks comprised the development proposals:

- Block A - 156 bedroom hotel
- Block B - Office building
- Block C - Office Building
- Block D - Residential building consisting of 40 residential units
- Block E\F - Office building
- Block G - Residential building consisting of 143 residential units
- Block H1 - Residential building consisting of 112 residential units
- Block H2 - Residential and retail building consisting of 160 residential units and 663m2 retail provision

Given the site's prominent location beside the Kingston Bridge in the Broomielaw area of the city, the Central Quay development had said to "help revitalise an important thoroughfare and contribute significant investment towards the ambitious regeneration of the Clyde Waterfront, which has been earmarked by Glasgow City Council as an area for urban renewal".

== Construction ==
Construction of the project was proposed to be undertaken in a number of construction phases, both as a practical manner due to constructing in the city centre, as well as to respond to occupational interests and requirements. It was agreed between the developer and Glasgow City Council that construction at the site would commence first at the north end of the site, then moving to the southern section of the site. A separate foul drainage system was to be installed at the site which was designed in accordance with Scottish Environment Protection Agency criteria.

A number of agencies were asked to consider the proposals and construction of the development, and the impact such development would have on the local area, each organisations and agencies operations as well as other issues. Land And Environmental Services (Public Health Unit) raised no objection to the development, subject to conditions, Scottish Water raised no objection nor did Scottish Power but did highlight the presence of a company sub-station and cables within vicinity. The Scottish Environment Protection Agency had no objection to the plans, and whilst the Environmental Services had no objections, they did place a number of conditions to their decision. Transport Planning of Glasgow City Council and Transport Scotland had no objections, subject to conditions and a legal agreement securing financial contributions in relation to ‘fastlink’ and improvement to Junction 19.

== Operations ==
In 2022, property development company Summix Capital acquired a development site from XLB, with plans to develop a mixed-use scheme on the land. The site includes an office building at 2 Central Quay, and a neighbouring 4.43 acre development site. NHS Education for Scotland has operational offices on the site, with Summit Capital saying that this has "the potential for other clients to move in alongside NHS Education for Scotland".

== See also ==
- List of tallest buildings and structures in Glasgow
