= List of tallest buildings and structures in Scotland =

See separate lists:

- List of tallest buildings and structures in Edinburgh
- List of tallest buildings and structures in Glasgow

UK-wide lists:

- List of tallest buildings in the United Kingdom
- List of tallest structures in the United Kingdom
- List of tallest buildings and structures in the United Kingdom by usage
- List of tallest buildings in the United Kingdom by settlement
