= City Wharf =

- Architecture design proposals submitted by Manson (2024)

General information
- Architectural style: Modernist
- Location: Anderston Quay, Glasgow, Scotland
- Year built: 2024–present
- Construction started: August 2024
- Estimated completion: August 2026
- Opening: September 2027
- Cost: £200 million

Height
- Height: 87m (285 ft)

Technical details
- Floor count: 28

Design and construction
- Architects: Axis Mason & Hodder and Partners
- Architecture firm: Manson

City Wharf is a residential development consisting of student accommodation and BTR residential units currently under construction in the city of Glasgow, in the central belt of Scotland. The tallest aspect of the development, known as The Stores, is a 28-storey, 87m (285ft) BTR tower with a part 9, part 14-storey neighbour. Block B (33m, 10 storeys) will also be BTR, while Block A (27m, 8 storeys) will be student accommodation. Construction on Block A formally began in August 2024 and is scheduled to be completed in August 2026. Blocks B and C are due to follow as Phase 2 of the project.

Upon its completion, Block C will become the second tallest building in Glasgow after the 114m Ard tower (currently under construction), surpassing the University of Glasgow Tower which stands at 85m (279 ft).

== Background ==
Plans were submitted to Glasgow City Council in April 2023 for "almost 1,000 homes" to be constructed on a "landmark location". The developer, Dandara Living, said that following "a series of public consultations", the company believed that their "application offers a terrific opportunity to create a development that reflects its unique and highly visible location". In May 2023, Dandara Living altered the existing plans submitted to Glasgow City Council in order to seek planning permission to erect a memorial to commemorate the Cheapside Street whisky bond fire on 28 March 1960, a fire which cost 19 people their lives and is considered "to be the worst post-war fire services disaster".

In March 2024, Dandara Living, the developer of the project, obtained planning permission from Glasgow City Council to commence work on the project. It pitched the idea as aiming to "transform a derelict site" in the Anderston Quay area of the city, and will provide nearly 500 one, two and three bedroom homes for rent, 490 rooms for student accommodation and various units for commercial use. The ground and first floor of City Wharf will include a cycle hub, an open plan gym, a residents lounge as well as co-working spaces. The student accommodation will be housed in a separate 8 storey building on the site.

In February 2025, it was announced that Dandara Living and Gamuda Land UK together established a joint venture for the project. The venture was in response to what both companies described as "addressing the acute shortage of high-quality student accommodation in one of the UK’s most vibrant and undersupplied student markets".

== Planning and construction ==
=== Design and features ===
In a statement, the architectural firm Manson who designed the building, claimed that the "main key objective of the project is to create a thriving, mixed use development which also acts as a landmark for the city". City Wharf has said to have been designed to be "a well ordered, sophisticated geometric form which will be recognisable in the Glasgow skyline". The design of the building also aims to "maximise the views along the Riverside and towards the City Centre with the use of a feature beacon and viewing platform to the top storeys".

One piece of criteria set by Glasgow City Council when granting planning permission was that the building must meet Glasgow's climate targets as well as the councils planning policies. As a result, City Wharf is "designed with a strong emphasis on sustainability", integrating "low- and zero-carbon technologies, including air-source heat pumps".

As a result of the buildings close proximity to the River Clyde, developers noted a number of pieces of tapestry "of interesting former uses of the site that can be tapped into". Proposals submitted to Glasgow City Council suggested the "use these motifs to create a sense of place that relates back to the industrial heritage and the families of the area". Block C, the tallest structure of the complex, will contain a viewing platform.

=== Construction ===
In April 2024, it was confirmed that the Stephenson Group had been appointed as the main contractor for the construction of the building. The projected cost of the construction of the tower is estimated to be £200 million. Construction of the first phase formally began in August 2024, with the foundations of the building "almost complete" by the end of Autumn that same year. The first section of the ground floor slab was cast in November 2024, with two concrete cores visible around the area.

=== Opening ===
The City Wharf building is expected to become fully open and operation in September 2027.

== Locality ==
City Wharf is bounded by Piccadilly Street to the north, Warroch Street to the west, Anderston Quay and the River Clyde to the south and Newton Street to the east. The building is situated amongst other low–rise residential buildings, and will be the main tower of an overall complex of three buildings. Block A will be 27m, Block B 33m tall and Block C (City Wharf) being the tallest building of the development standing at 86m. Prior to the construction of the tower, a wind survey highlighted that wind speeds in the area were at risk of being greater than the stated safety criteria, particularly at the southeast corner of the site. It further stated that the erection of a seventeen storey tower at the southwest corner would create additional challenges regarding winds at Warroch Street. Despite the raising of some concerns around wind, the report concluded that the overall structure satisfied wind safety criteria, but noted the corner of Warroch Street was an exception to their conclusion.

The building is within a 2.29-hectare (5.56 acres) site at Anderston Quay, next to the Kingston Bridge. Additionally, it is nearby to the International Financial Services District at the southern edge of the city centre, otherwise, it is surrounded by a number of mixed use developments such as offices, residential, hotel and ground floor commercial uses with the residential elements. A relatively narrow site, it is impacted upon by the Kingston Bridge from the northern most point to the southern point of the site, creating serious limitations for development opportunities on the eastern side of the site.

The design and structures of the adjacent developments surrounding the site were taken into consideration by developers prior to finalising applications for planning permission to Glasgow City Council, and have incorporated a new public park with a north-south pedestrian link providing improved pedestrian access to Glasgow City Centre.

== City Wharf Complex ==
City Wharf will be a development of three buildings – Block A, B and C, with Block C being the largest structure on the site and therefore considered a focal point for the development. Upon its completion, it will become the second largest building in the city and be visible from various points across the city and become a prominent structure in the overall city skyline. Block A will consist of an 8 storey building providing purpose built student accommodation with a total of 491 beds consisting of 21% studio flats and 79% cluster flats.

Block B will be a 10 storey building, and Block C will be the main 27 storey skyscraper. Together, both buildings will provide 503 Built to Rent units consisting of 11% studios, 39% 1 bed apartments, 45% 2 bed apartments and 5% 3 bed apartments. 70% of Block A, 82% of Block B and 72% of Block C façade will consist of active frontages which include entrances, amenity spaces, stair cores, studios and cycle storage.

== See also ==
- The Ard, contemporaneous nearby project of similar height
