= Bridle Works Building =

20-storey student accommodation building in Glasgow, Scotland

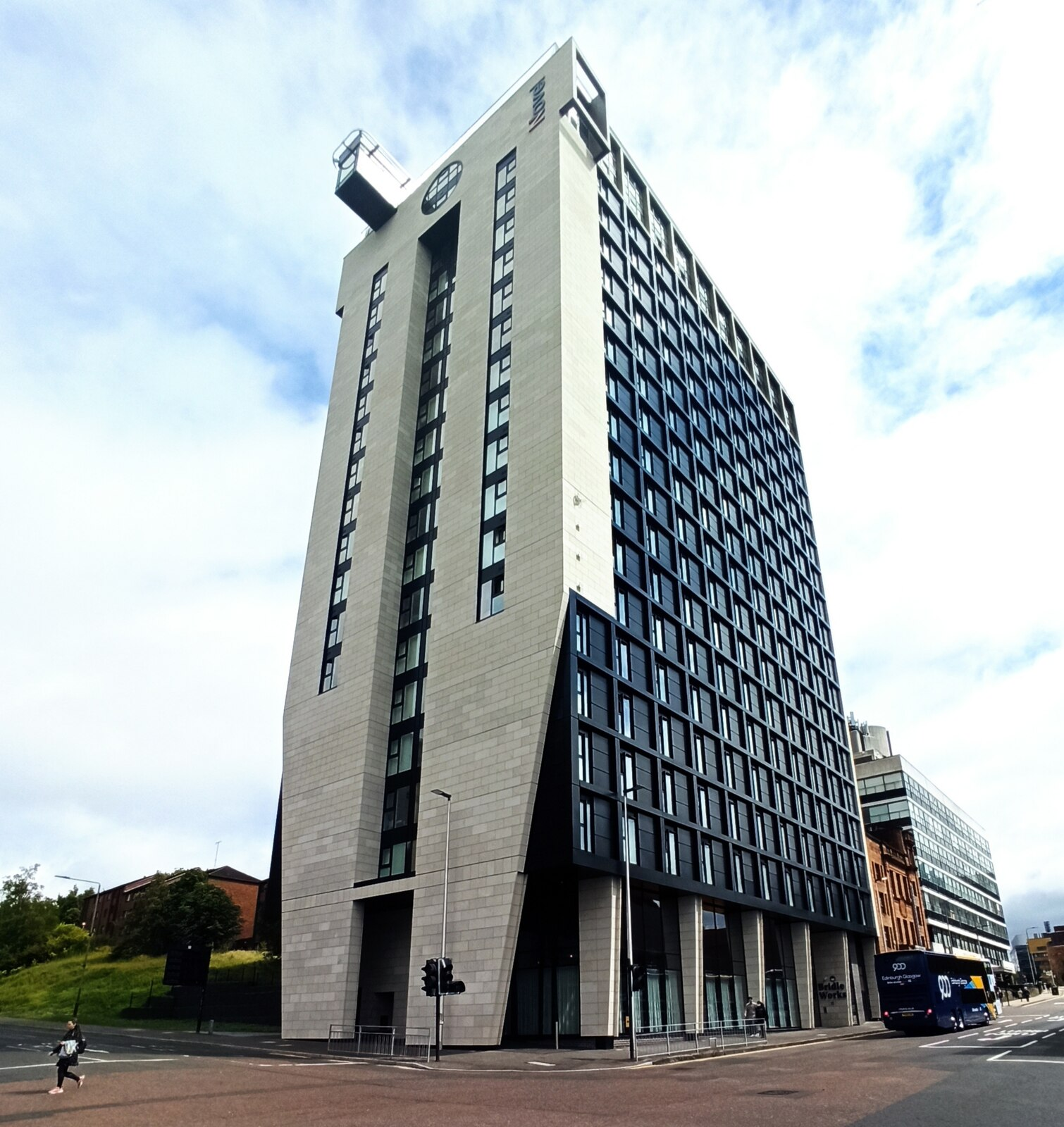
- The building in 2022
- Interactive map of the Bridle Works Building area

General information
- Architectural style: Modernist
- Location: 350 Cathedral Street, Glasgow, G1 2BQ
- Coordinates: 55.862945°N 4.251771°W
- Year built: 2019–2021
- Groundbreaking: 2019
- Construction started: 15 July 2019
- Completed: Mid-Late 2021
- Opened: September–October 2021
- Cost: £95 million
- Owner: Stride Treglown

Technical details
- Material: Concrete panels with aluminium panel details and metal extrusions, KME Gold coloured cladding and zinc
- Size: 68m (223ft)
- Floor count: 20

Design and construction
- Architecture firm: Watkin Jones Group

Website
- Bridleworks.com

Bridle Works Building is a 20-storey student accommodation 68m high tower located at 366 Cathedral Street in Scotland's largest city, Glasgow. It is situated within walking distance of the city centre and to two of the city's three main universities, Glasgow Caledonian University and the University of Strathclyde.

Housing 422 rooms, the building has its own tea lounge, glam room and rooftop terrace. The building was named in honour of Joan Eardley, a Glasgow School of Art graduate who had a studio in the area and who was famed for her paintings of oxen and horses. The building's aesthetic deliberately mimics elements of the 1960s Met Tower which stands diagonally opposite.

== Background ==
Application for planning permission was submitted in September 2015 by Glasgow developers Savills (UK) Ltd located on West George Street in the city. The 840.00sq.m site previously housed a furniture showroom (itself a converted church) which would be demolished in order for construction of Bridle Works Building to commence. A previous application for the structure was submitted to Glasgow City Council in 2014 and whilst found to comply with the councils City Plan 2 policy, the developer submitted changes to that scheme to comprise design development of external alterations, reconfiguration of floor plans and an increase in number of bedrooms by 46 to a total of 414. There were no external alterations between the first plan submitted in 2014 and the approve plan in 2016, but rather the design development of the structure as a result of the structural solutions required for construction and the internal alterations this created. The amended resubmitted plan mainly focused on the reconfiguration of the ground floor and mezzanine, the reconfiguration of the basement to accommodate structural changes and improve cycle parking facilities, the relocation of the subway from the north east corner of building to the middle of the elevation to improve animation and security at that corner, the installation of concrete cladding continued onto the eastern elevation of the building, installation of glazing at ground floor level on the north elevation of the building to improve animation, alterations to fenestration on west elevation and the reconfiguration of floor plans and creation of 46 more bedrooms.

On 27 October 2016, Glasgow City Council granted permission to Saville (UK) Ltd for the construction to commence. The council attached a number of conditions to the agreement, ranging from specified drawings submitted to the planning authority required to be met during construction, the requirement for external materials to be brick, polished concrete, glazing, fritted glazing, powder coated aluminium in order to safeguard the property itself and the amenity of the surrounding area and no external gas and water pipes, gas and water meter boxes, balanced flues, solar panels, wind turbines, burglar alarms, security lights and cameras, air conditioning and ventilation plant, grilles or ducts to be installed on the elevations of the building. Notification was formally given to surrounding properties by the developer on 9 June 2016 for the intention of work to commence.

== Construction ==
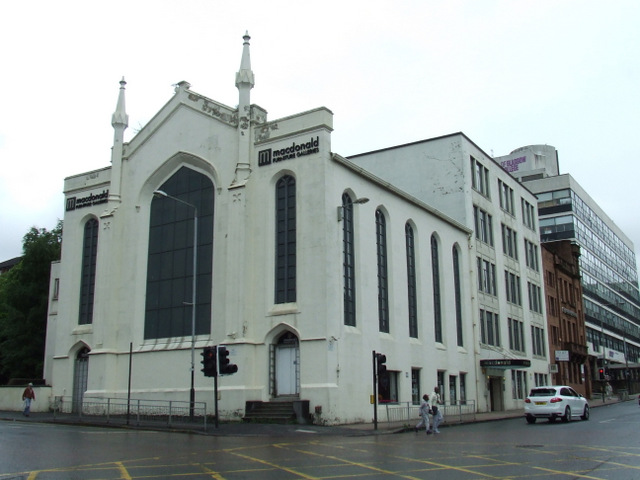
A church converted to a furniture showroom (view from south-west, 2013) previously occupied the site

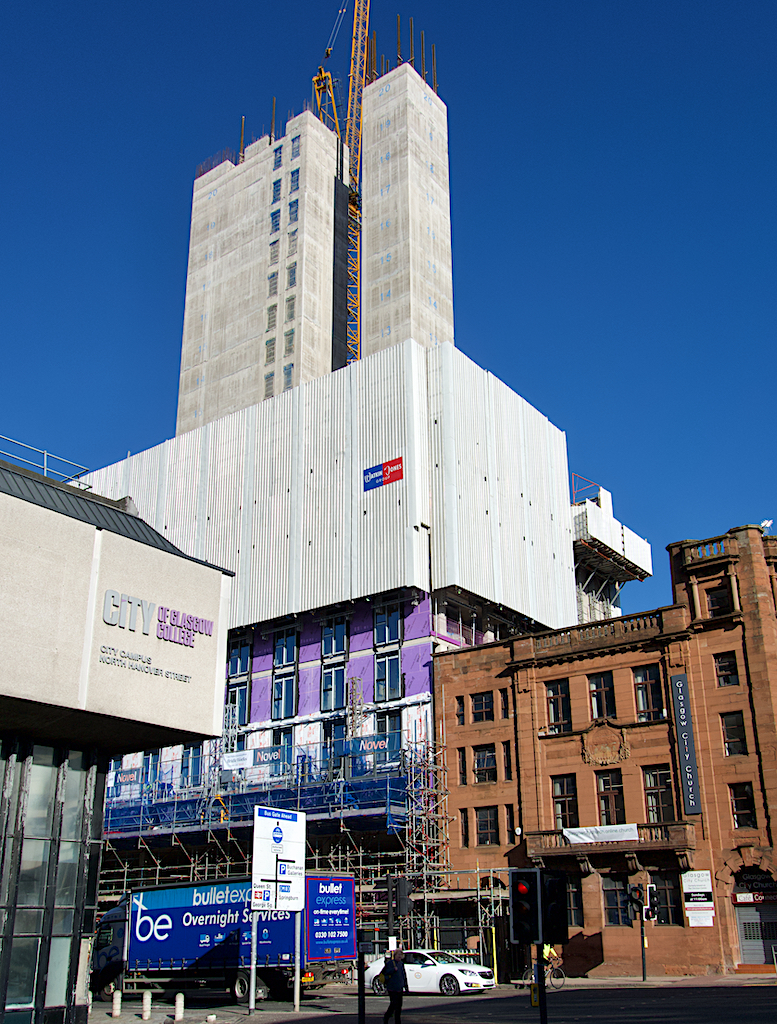
Early stages of construction (view from south), September 2020

Development and construction firm Watkin Jones Group was granted the contract to construct the building. Construction began on 15 July 2019, with Watkin Jones Group, based in Wales, appointed to carry out and oversee the development of the structure. Developer of the construction, Stride Treglown, objected to a number of conditions that Glasgow City Council had placed on the approved application, with a number of exchanges between the developer and Glasgow City Council taking place throughout 2019 with the developer urging the council to discharge a number of conditions.

A total of eleven constraints were attached to the proposals and development of the structure. NATS placed a constraint on the application due to windturbine development.

== Completion and controversies ==
The building was somewhat completed by 9 October 2021, but quickly drew criticism and complaints from students, some of whom had paid £10,000 up front for the year's accommodation. The development was branded as "unfinished" and "filthy", with a total of 38 international students raising complaints regarding rooms being covered in dust from ongoing construction work, holes in ceilings and floors, exposed wiring, unfinished communal areas, flooding and leaks as well as the requirement for upfront rent costs to be paid for rooms that were not yet complete. Fire alarms were another prominent issue, with one student claiming that the alarm had gone off 40 times since they arrived, sometimes in the middle of the night.

Novel Student, which runs the building, issued a statement following reports from BBC News regarding the condition of the building, stating "We are naturally disappointed to hear of any resident experiences that fall short of that. The COVID-19 pandemic has undoubtedly presented significant challenges to our operations given the three-month construction shutdown - a universal obstacle experienced by companies working in different capacities across the real estate industry. It is our goal to always ensure the on-time delivery of products to residents, and given the significant challenges we have faced, we have had to accelerate this process to the best of our ability".

The University of Strathclyde was quick to confirm that it "had no agreement with Novel and had not referred any students there".

== Accolades ==
The building was a finalist in the Living Interiors category at the Mixology North22 Project of the Year Awards.

== See also ==
- List of tallest buildings and structures in Glasgow
