= Glasgow Sheriff Court =

Court in Glasgow, Scotland

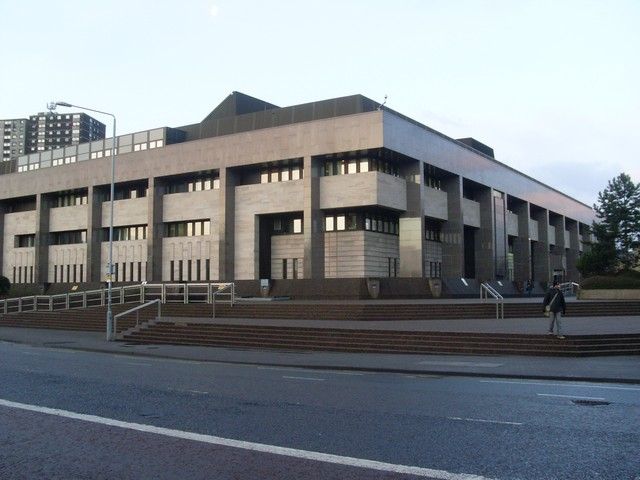
- Glasgow Sheriff Court, viewed from Gorbals Street
- Interactive map of Glasgow Sheriff Court
- 55.852778°N 4.253333°W
- Location: Glasgow
- Coordinates: 55.852778°N 4.253333°W
- Number of positions: 28

Sheriff Principal
- Currently: Aisha Anwar
- Since: 2023

Glasgow Sheriff Court is a sheriff court in the Gorbals (Laurieston) area of Glasgow, within the sheriffdom of Glasgow and Strathkelvin. Reputedly the busiest court in Europe, it is a Category B listed building.

== History ==
Until the mid-1980s, hearings took place in the Old Sheriff Court in Wilson Street. However, as the number of court cases in Glasgow grew, it became necessary to commission a modern courthouse for criminal matters. The site the court officials selected had previously been occupied by the Gorbals School located on the corner of Clyde Place and Buchan Street, but also facing onto Kirk Street, all of which were cleared in the mid-20th century.

The new court is located at 1 Carlton Place in the Gorbals area of Glasgow, on the banks of the River Clyde and adjacent to Glasgow Central Mosque. It is a three-storey building of large cut stone construction and was designed by the local architectural firm Keppie Design. The building is notable for its imposing mock Brutalist form – with its detail interior features being strongly influenced by the style of Charles Rennie Mackintosh, with bespoke light fittings, skylights, dividing walls and lift interiors all designed to the Mackintosh language. The main atrium and circulation spaces conformed strongly to the Brutalist paradigm, with soaring exposed concrete ceilings and pillars.

The building was formally opened by Queen Elizabeth II on 29 July 1986. In 2008, the roof of the building was fitted with 700 square metres of solar panels, with the capacity to create some 97 kW of power. The system cost £500,000 to install, has an expected life-span of forty years, and is predicted to cut £20,000 from the Court's electricity bill, whilst saving around forty tonnes of carbon dioxide per year.

== Operations ==
The court deals with both criminal and civil cases. There are currently twenty-eight sheriffs in post at Glasgow Sheriff Court (five of whom are floating sheriffs). They sit alone in civil cases and are assisted by a jury of fifteen members selected from the electoral roll in some criminal cases (cases involving solemn proceedings only). The Sheriff Principal is Aisha Anwar who replaced Sheriff Principal Craig Turnbull in 2023.
