= Buchanan Wharf =

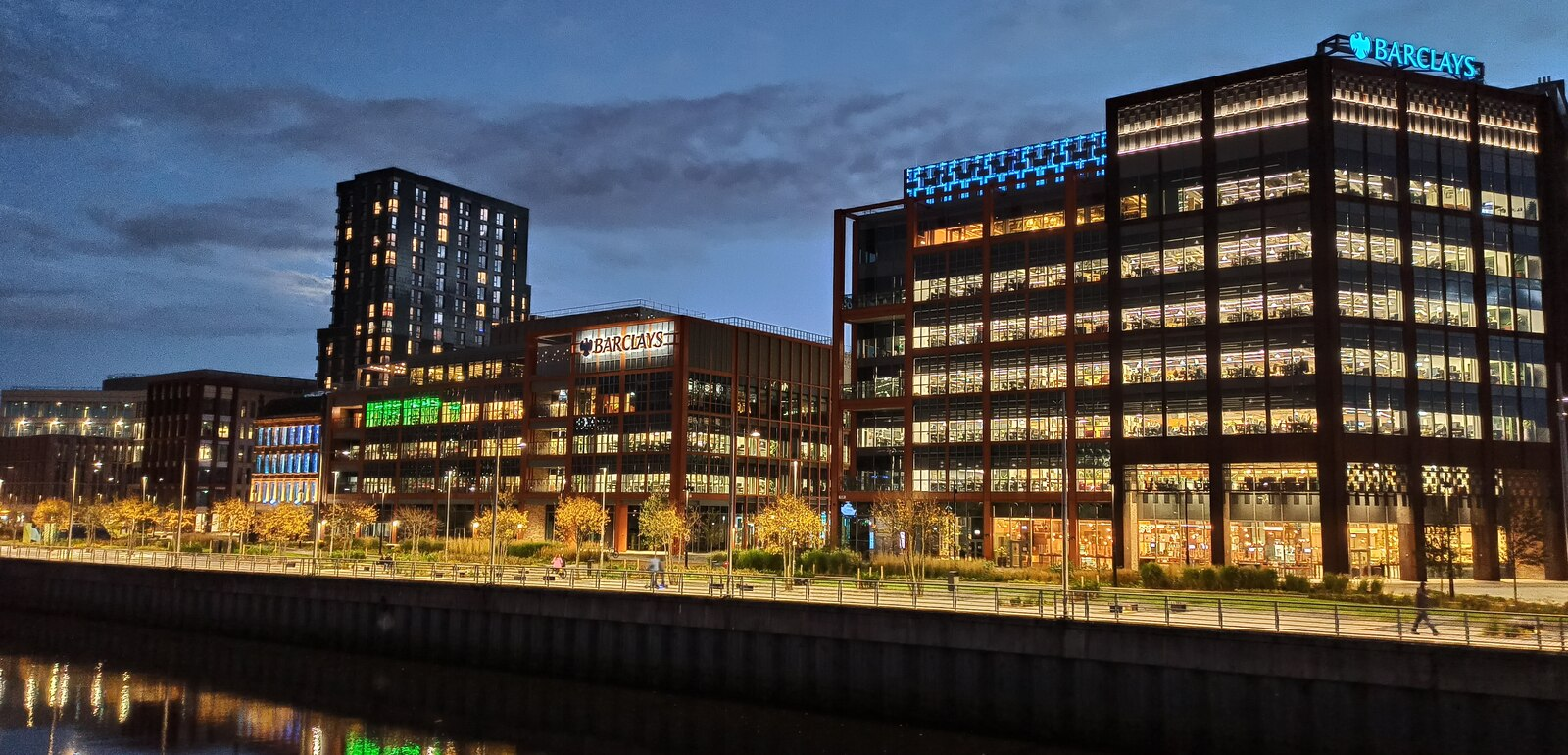
- A night view of the Barclays Bank complex at Tradeston on the south bank of the Clyde. Viewed from the Tradeston Bridge.
- Interactive map of the Buchanan Wharf area

General information
- Architectural style: Modernist
- Location: Clyde Place, Glasgow, Scotland, G5 8AQ
- Coordinates: 55.8546°N 4.2621°W
- Year built: 2018–2023
- Groundbreaking: 2018
- Construction started: 2 November 2018
- Completed: 2023
- Opened: October 2021 (Barclays Bank HQ); Autumn 2023 (SLC HQ)
- Cost: £95 million
- Owner: Drum Property

Technical details
- Material: Rinaldi- structal bespoke unitised curtain walling, varied selection of wall types, Corten steel, beaded, silicone glazed and traditional small pane systems
- Size: 500,000 sq ft (46,000 m^{2}); 15,000 sq ft (1,400 m^{2}) (Building 1); 205,000 sq ft (19,000 m^{2}) (Building 2); 70,000 sq ft (6,500 m^{2}) (Building 3)
- Floor count: 19
- Floor area: 36,353 m^{2}

Design and construction
- Architect: Halliday Fraser Munro
- Architecture firm: Stallan-Brand Architecture + Design Ltd

Buchanan Wharf is a complex of five mixed use buildings in the Tradeston area of Glasgow, Scotland. The complex comprises a total of five buildings, Clyde Place House, Tradescroft, Windmillcroft, Wellcroft and Grays Hill, with main usage being designated as office buildings. The complex houses the European headquarters of Barclays, as well as the headquarters of the Student Loans Company, with other buildings in the complex ranging in usage from residential accommodation to a mix of local amenities.

The complex comprises two 18-storey twin towers which consist of a total of 324 apartments with dining and gym facilities, a residents lounge, games room and a 4,250-square-foot (395-square-metre) roof terrace.

== Background ==
Construction firm Drum secured the deal with Barclays Bank to construct a new office space in the city centre of Glasgow consisting of a 470,000 sq ft (44,000 m^{2}) Campus at the Buchanan Wharf complex. The deal to purchase around 470,000 sq ft (44,000 m^{2}) of "prime Grade A office space" created accommodation for roughly 2,500 additional jobs in the city, almost doubling Barclays current workforce in Scotland, making the bank one of Glasgow's biggest commercial employers.

The multi-million pound development deal for Buchanan Wharf saw one of Scotland's biggest construction projects. The site provides more than one million square feet (93,000 square metres) of office space, residential accommodation and a mix of local amenities and landscaped public spaces. Described by Barclays Bank as the "flagship project" for the bank, the development was welcomed by at the time First Minister of Scotland Nicola Sturgeon who said "This is a project that will be transformational for Glasgow, creating up to 2,500 new jobs in the heart of the city. The new campus will strengthen Glasgow’s financial services sector and shows Scotland continues to be a highly attractive location for inward investment".

== Development ==
Construction on the complex began in 2018, with the construction of the Barclays Bank building being completed by 2021 when it was officially opened by First Minister of Scotland Nicola Sturgeon. The entire complex was completed over the following two years, with the final phase involving the construction of a six-storey building – to become the headquarters for the Student Loans Company after a 20-year lease of the building was agreed – due to be occupied by 1,100 staff by Autumn 2023.

The complex comprises a total of five Buildings, each of which varies in terms of height, floor space and usage, with two twin tower buildings consisting of 324 Build to Rent (BTR) apartments for Legal & General Investment Management (LGIM), a six-storey office building for the Student Loans Company, and a five-storey office building serving as the Northern European campus HQ of Barclays Bank.

== Site ==
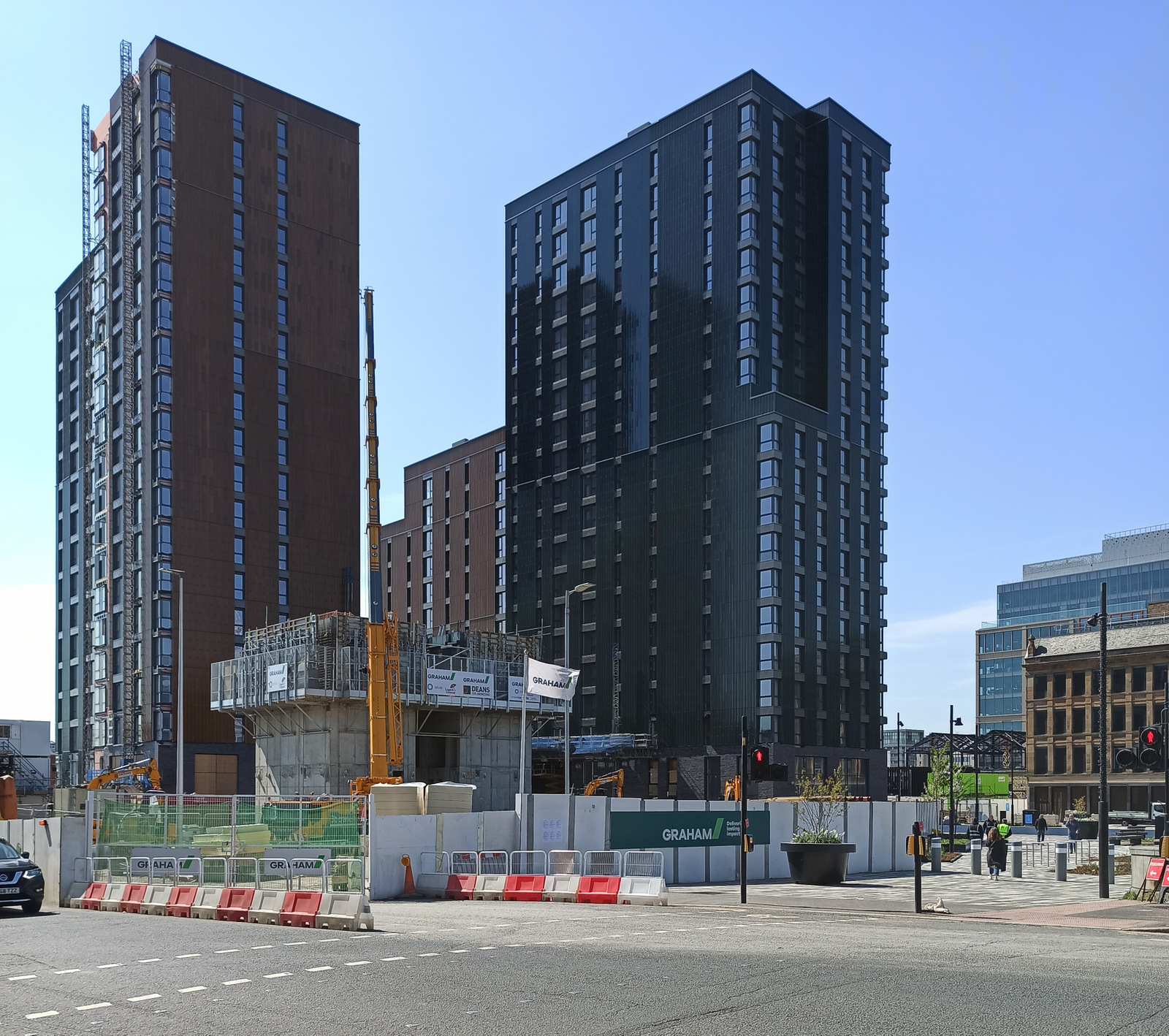
The Twin Towers at the site

=== Buildings ===
The Buchanan Wharf complex comprises five buildings in total:

- Clyde Place House
- Tradescroft
- Windmillcroft
- Wellcroft
- Grays Hill

=== Location ===
The complex is located in the Tradeston area of Glasgow City Centre which suffered profoundly from the demise of the shipbuilding and associated river dock industries that Glasgow had become renowned for and on which its economy had largely depended, as well as traffic management systems operating in the area. The area lies on the banks of the River Clyde, incorporating three entire city blocks, and is seen to being key to Glasgow's city centre regeneration strategies. It is served by Bridge Street station on the Glasgow Subway.

Citing a lack of clear urban form of the development of the derelict site, contractors Stallan-Brand Architecture + Design Ltd presented development plans to establish a "new destination for the area", with a primary focus on movement, accessibility, and permeability.

== Accolades ==
The development won both the Master Planning award and Regeneration Project of the Year award at the 2022 Scottish Design Awards.

== See also ==
- List of tallest buildings and structures in Glasgow
- Economy of Scotland
