= Elphinstone Place =

General information
- Status: Never built
- Type: Residential and Mixed Use
- Location: Glasgow
- Coordinates: 55.863134°N 4.269746°W

Height
- Roof: 134 metres (440 ft)

Technical details
- Floor count: 39

Design and construction
- Architect: Cooper Cromar

Elphinstone Place is a cancelled skyscraper project that was scheduled to be built in Glasgow, Scotland. The building, which had been in the planning stage since 2004 would have been a mixed-use development consisting of office, retail and residential. It was to be built on the site of the former Strathclyde Regional Council Headquarters.

In July 2008 The developers Elphinstone announced that the building had been cancelled due to the difficulties arising from the subprime mortgage crisis, with one of the main financial backers of the project being the failed Lehman Brothers. Although ground work had been completed for the tower it was indicated by the developer that a "fall-back project is not in place" for the site.

At 39-stories the structure would have been the tallest building in both Glasgow and Scotland. The building would have been situated at the western end of Blythswood Hill on the edge of Glasgow's financial district (IFSD).

In July 2012, it was announced that the site would instead be used for a new headquarters complex for the energy company, Scottish Power; that project, of more modest height (albeit still around 60 metres) was completed in 2017.

In 2024, planning permission was granted for a 36-story residential tower 100 metres to the north on the same site known as The Ard, which if constructed, will become Glasgow's tallest habitable structure.

== See also ==
- List of tallest buildings and structures in Glasgow
