= Glasgow Tower =

Observation tower in Glasgow City, Scotland

Glasgow Tower Millennium Tower (2001)
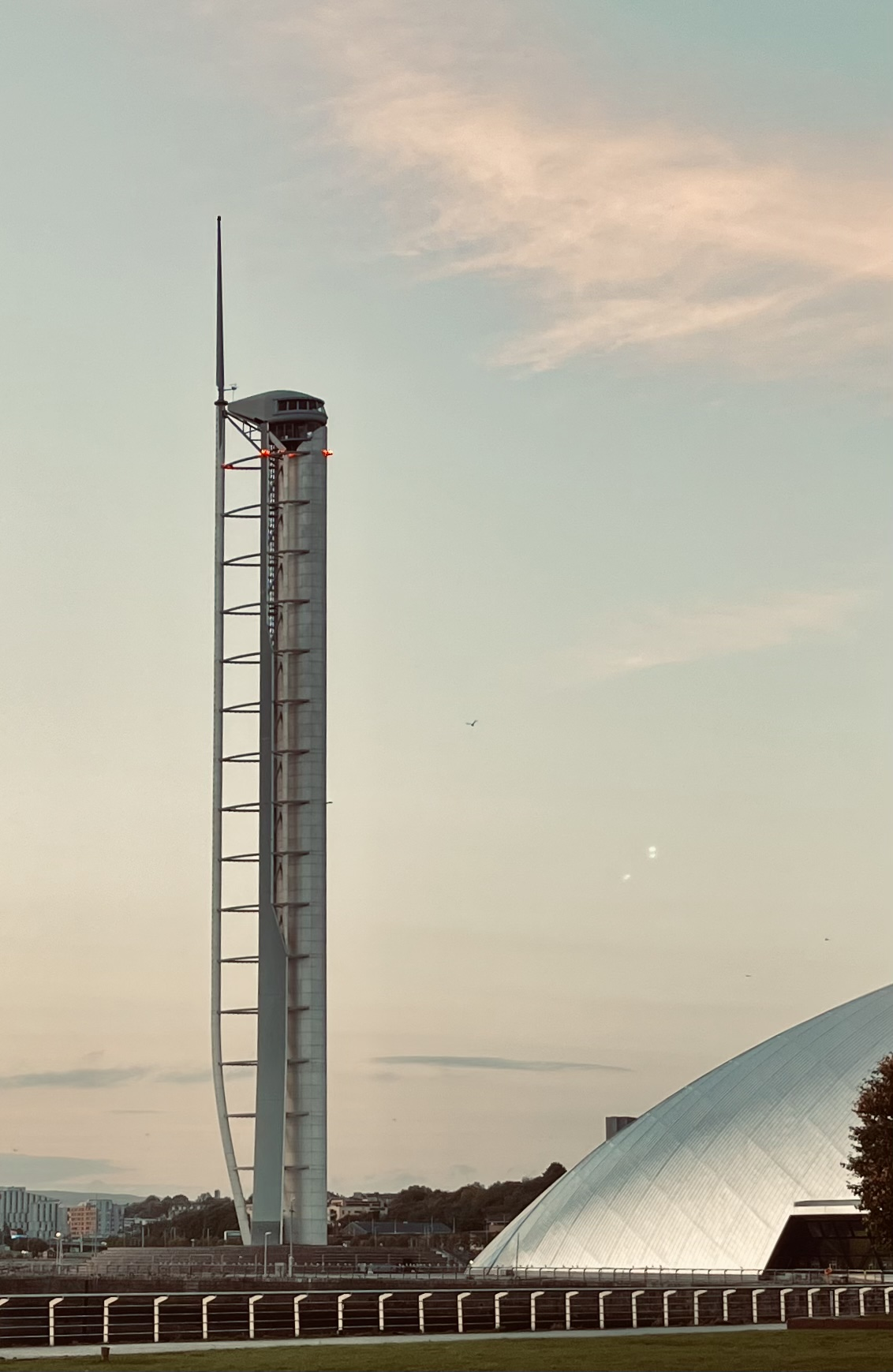
- Glasgow Tower, October 2023

Record height
- Tallest in Scotland since 2001^{[I]}
- Preceded by: Bluevale and Whitevale Towers

General information
- Type: Observation tower
- Location: Glasgow Science Centre, 50 Pacific Quay, Glasgow, Scotland, G51 1EA
- Coordinates: 55.8592°N 4.2961°W
- Completed: 2001

Height
- Antenna spire: 127 m (417 ft)

Design and construction
- Architect: Richard Horden
- Structural engineer: Buro Happold

Website
- Glasgow Tower

Glasgow Tower (formerly known as the Millennium Tower) is a 127 metres (417 ft) free-standing landmark observation tower located on the south bank of the River Clyde in Glasgow, Scotland, and is part of the Glasgow Science Centre complex. It holds a Guinness World Record for being the tallest fully rotating freestanding structure in the world, in which the whole structure is capable of rotating 360 degrees.

The Glasgow Tower is currently the tallest building in Glasgow and Scotland, and has held these records since its completion in 2001. It was designed by architect Richard Horden in 1992 and was initially proposed as a landmark for the city, with a proposal to build the tower in city's St Enoch Square. It was later decided that, due to its "unique design", it would be constructed to accompany the Glasgow Science Centre complex instead.

== Background ==
=== Site ===
The structure occupies the same site where an earlier observation tower was built for the Glasgow Garden Festival in 1988 – that structure, known as the Clydesdale Bank Tower featured a rotating gondola that ascended up a central spine. The structure was however not intended to be permanent and was dismantled at the end of 1988 and re-erected in Rhyl, Wales where it was renamed the Rhyl Sky Tower and remained in operation until 2010 before being decommissioned. As the Clydesdale Bank Tower had been of the most popular attractions of the Garden Festival, the will remained to erect a replacement tower on the same spot as part of the ongoing regeneration of Princes Dock.

=== Accolades ===
At 127 metres (417 ft), the Glasgow Tower is currently the tallest tower in Scotland, and since late 2015, following the demolition of both the Red Road Flats and the Bluevale and Whitevale Towers, the structure is now the tallest building in all of Glasgow. It holds a Guinness World Record for being the tallest tower in the world in which the whole structure is capable of rotating 360 degrees.

The whole structure originally rested upon a Swedish-made 65-centimetre-diameter (26 in) thrust bearing, but this was replaced with a phosphor-manganese-bronze alloy solid ball and cup bearing prior to a re-opening in 2014. This bearing rests at the bottom of a 15-metre-deep (49 ft) caisson. The tower itself is not directly connected to these foundations, instead being supported by a ring of 24 rubber-sprung roller bearings at Podium level. This is to allow the building to rotate to face into the wind.

The tower has two lifts, each with a 12-person capacity, but for reasons of passenger comfort, this is limited to 6 guests plus a single member of staff. The lifts, manufactured by Alimak Hek, ascend the tower in two and a half minutes using a rack and pinion system, providing views to the rear of the tower through all-around glass windows. There is also an emergency staircase, comprising 523 stairs from the Cabin level to the Podium.

=== Design ===
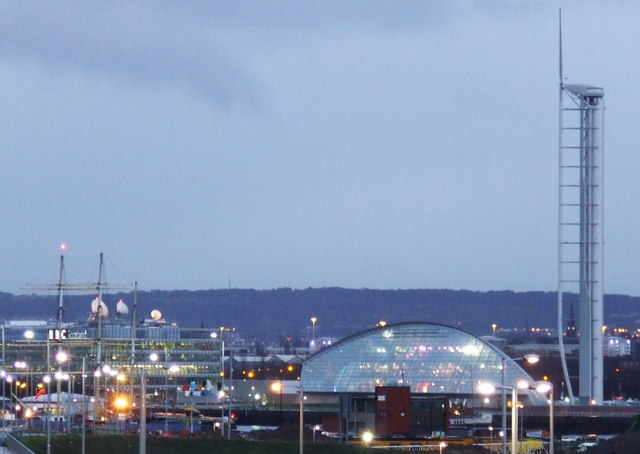
The tower overlooks Pacific Quay

The tower is in the shape of an aerofoil (as if a symmetrical aircraft wing had been set in the ground vertically), with 4 manually operated 6 kW motors to turn it into the wind to reduce wind resistance and improve stability through aerodynamic forces (wind split by the aerofoil applies an equal force to both sides of the structure, holding it in place). The tower, previously known as the Millennium Tower, was the winning design in an international competition to design a tower for the city centre of Glasgow. The original architectural design was by the architect Richard Horden, with engineering design by Buro Happold, but after commissioning the project was taken over by the Glasgow architects BDP. In the end, the tower cost £10 million. Glasgow City Council successfully sued contractors Carillion over the quality of the work.

Considered a world first, the Glasgow Tower is a "very innovative engineering structure that represents some of the best principles and applications of large-scale engineering design and construction". During build design and construction, a complex would typically have one or more prototypes created to "prove the design before constructing a production model". Given the scope of Glasgow Tower structure, this was deemed impossible and unachievable. As a result, the concept which had been created by designers "had to be proven in place" once the structure had been complete. With the untested design, the Glasgow Tower initially had a number of issues following its completion, ranging from the lift to the observation deck getting stuck, as well as "strain on the thrust bearing". The original thrust bearing which had been used during the construction of the tower was found to be incompatible with the structure and was ultimately replaced. The tower is jacked up annually by "up to half a metre" using a total of four hydraulic jacks, allowing the bearing to "be inspected or removed if required". During the annual maintenance routine, the bearing of the tower also "receives a synthetic grease treatment which is injected under high pressure and works its way along the grease channels on the bearing" which is considered vital to ensure the tower continues to turn smoothly.

=== "Tallest building" debate ===
Upon its completion in 2001, it became the second tallest self-supporting structure in Scotland, behind the Inverkip power station chimney (which was later demolished in 2013). The website for the tower claims it is the "tallest freestanding building in Scotland". Although the tower has an observation deck at 330 feet (100 m), it does not have floors continuously from the ground, and therefore the Council on Tall Buildings and Urban Habitat does not consider it to be a building.

== History and problems ==
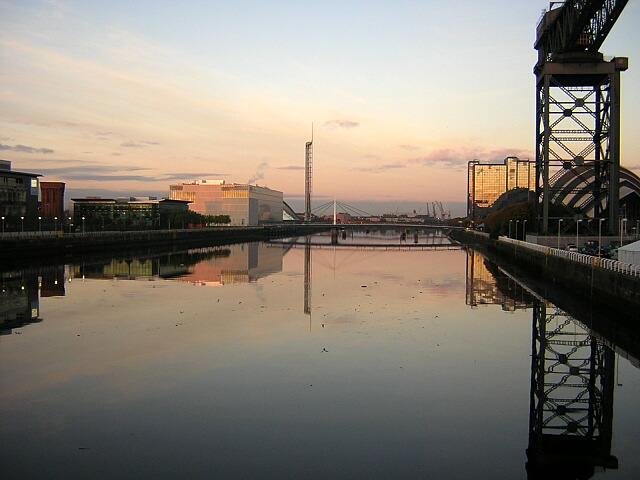
The tower is a prominent feature in the Glasgow skyline

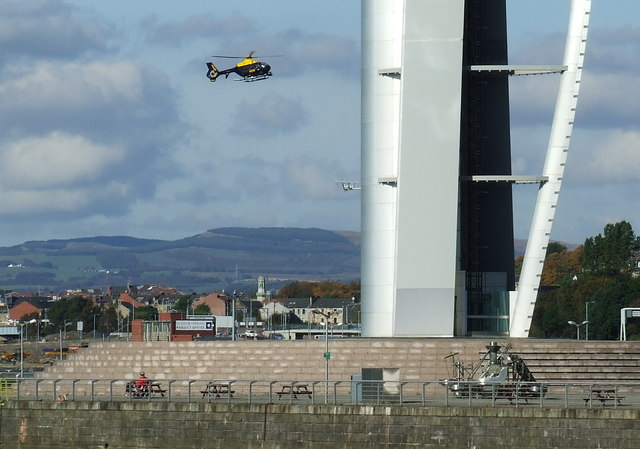
The base of the tower

The tower has been plagued by safety and engineering problems throughout its history. It missed its planned opening date in 2001. Problems with the Swedish-made thrust bearing on which it rotates led to it being closed between February 2002 and August 2004. On 30 January 2005, ten people were trapped in the lifts and their rescue took over five hours. Following the incident, the tower re-opened on 21 December 2006.

In September 2007, a charity abseiling event was held on Glasgow Tower. The Centre stated that 65,000 people have climbed the tower during its periods of operation.

In August 2010, the tower closed again due to "technical issues stemming from its original design".

Prior to re-opening in 2014, the thrust bearing was replaced with a ball and cup bearing, and the partial fix was featured in the TV documentary "Incredible Engineering Blunders: Fixed".

The tower opened to the public again in July 2014, with new safety features and an updated interior. It now operates annually across the summer months (between April and October), and will take passengers to the observation deck when wind speeds do not exceed approximately 11.2 metres per second (40 km/h; 25 mph), which ensures their comfort and enjoyment. Three days after opening, a capacitor bank at the base encountered a fault, producing smoke which was misidentified as a fire.

The tower closed to the public once again in 2020, which was initially due to the coronavirus pandemic. The restrictions which forced the tower to close have since been lifted and the refurbishments required after the period of disuse have now been completed, allowing the tower to reopen as of 26 May 2023.

The tower was again closed in 2025, with an expectation to reopen in Spring 2027.

== See also ==
- Spinnaker Tower
- Helsinki Olympic Stadium
- List of tallest freestanding structures
- Tallest structures by category
