= Aisha Anwar =

Scottish judge

The Honourable Lady Anwar KC

Senator of the College of Justice
- Incumbent
- Assumed office August 2026
- Monarch: Charles III
- First Minister: John Swinney

Sheriff Principal of Glasgow and Strathkelvin
- In office March 2023 – August 2026
- Monarch: Charles III
- First Minister: Nicola Sturgeon; Humza Yousaf; John Swinney
- Succeeded by: Stuart Reid (Temporary)

Personal details
- Born: Aisha Y. Anwar
- Education: University of Edinburgh; University of Oxford
- Occupation: Judge
- Profession: Lawyer

Aisha Y. Anwar, Lady Anwar KC is a Scottish judge who has served as a Senator of the College of Justice since August 2026. Lady Anwar was the Sheriff Principal of Glasgow and Strathkelvin from 2023 to 2026.

== Early life and education ==
Anwar graduated from the University of Edinburgh with a Bachelor of Laws with Honours in 1996, thereafter graduating from the University of Oxford with a Bachelor of Civil Law in 1998.

== Career ==
=== Early legal career ===
Upon graduating in 1998, she joined Maclay Murray and Spens as a trainee, admitted as a solicitor in 2000 and became an associate in 2003. Between 2009 and 2012 she became a partner and head of litigation for Scotland in a global law firm.

=== Judicial career ===
Anwar became a part-time sheriff in 2011, and became a resident sheriff in 2014, working as a designated family law and commercial law sheriff. She served as the Sheriff Principal of South Strathclyde, Dumfries and Galloway from 2020 until 2023, then becoming the Sheriff Principal of Glasgow and Strathkelvin from 2023 to 2026.

Anwar was appointed a Senator of the College of Justice in June 2026 by Charles III upon recommendation by the First Minister, taking up the appointment on 24 August 2026 with the judicial title The Hon. Lady Anwar.
