= Laurieston, Glasgow =

District of Glasgow, Scotland

Coordinates: 55.8493°N 4.2585°W

Laurieston
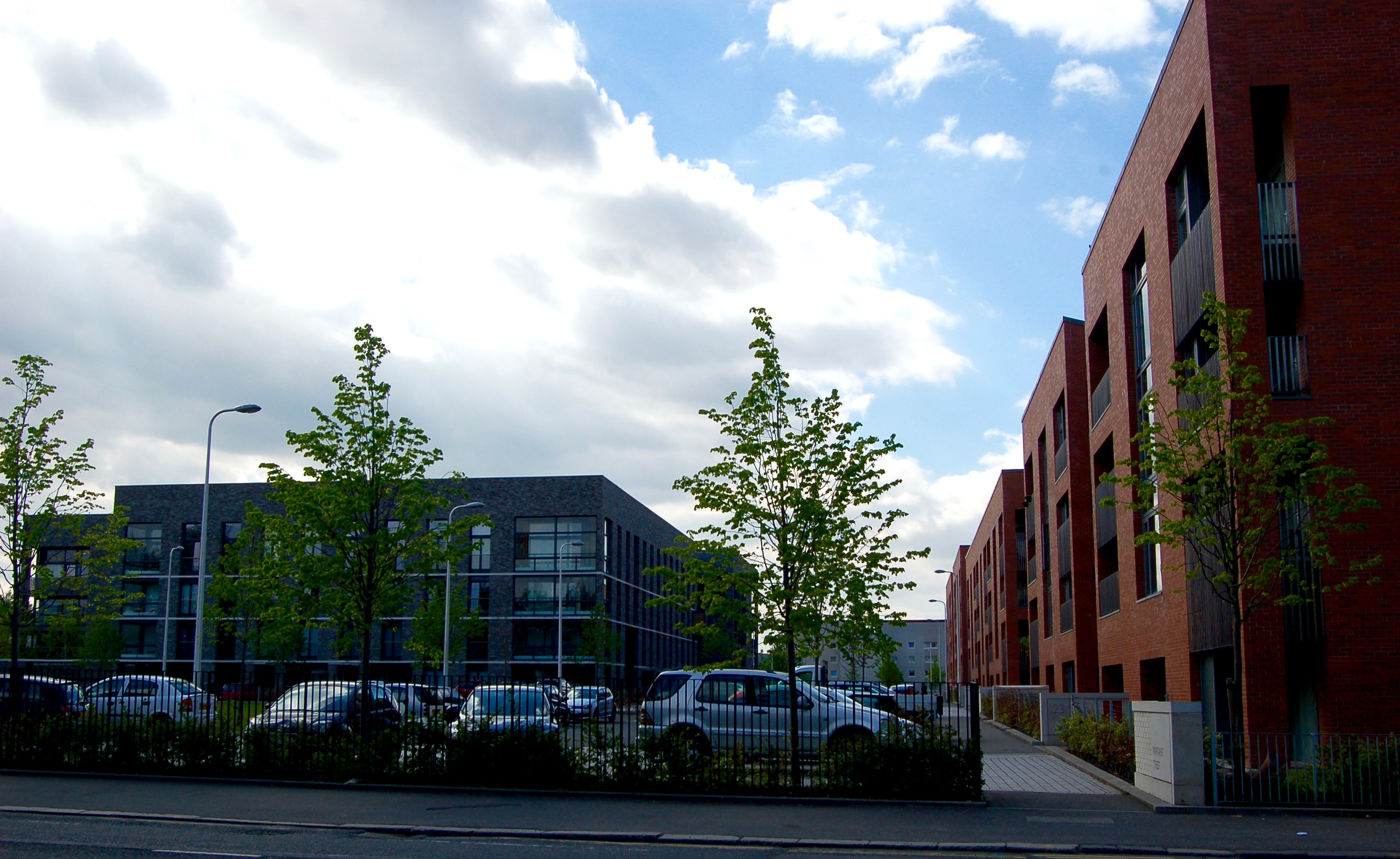

- Location within Glasgow
- OS grid reference: NS587641
- Council area: Glasgow City Council
- Lieutenancy area: Glasgow
- Country: Scotland
- Sovereign state: United Kingdom
- Post town: GLASGOW
- Postcode district: G5
- Dialling code: 0141
- Police: Scotland
- Fire: Scottish
- Ambulance: Scottish
- UK Parliament: Glasgow Central
- Scottish Parliament: Glasgow Shettleston

Laurieston is a district in the Gorbals area of the Scottish city of Glasgow. It is situated south of the River Clyde. It derives its name from James Laurie who, along with his brother, developed a large part of the district in the early 19th century.

== History ==
Laurieston is a core part of the Gorbals. Compared to other neighbourhoods in the vicinity, many of its 19th century buildings escaped the slum clearances of the 1960s and 70s, particularly in the north of the district close to the river. However the tenements further south were swept away to be replaced by four black 'slab' tower blocks (which actually consisted of four pairs of towers with separate entrances, joined together externally). Whilst the blocks (Norfolk Court and Stirlingfauld Place) solved a short term housing need and were popular with some residents due to their proximity to central Glasgow, they were expensive to maintain and became increasingly undesirable in terms of their build quality and aesthetic appeal. Over a period of several years in the early 21st century the residents were relocated and the towers demolished. A further redevelopment of modern low rise apartments is now underway.

Some local landmarks, such as Glasgow Sheriff Court and the O2 Academy Glasgow (the former New Bedford Cinema) are most accurately located in Laurieston.

Laurieston is served by Bridge Street subway station on the Glasgow Subway. Many local bus routes also converge there (on Eglinton Street and Gorbals Street) before entering Glasgow city centre. The West Coast Main Line railway tracks form the western boundary of the district and there are other tracks nearby (linking to the City Union Bridge), but it has been several decades since Laurieston or the Gorbals had its own train station.

== See also ==
- Glasgow tower blocks
- List of tallest voluntarily demolished buildings
