= M8 Bridge to Nowhere =

Unfinished bridges in Glasgow, Scotland

Bridge to Nowhere is a nickname used to refer to various unfinished structures around the M8 motorway in the centre of Glasgow, Scotland. They were built in the 1960s as part of the Glasgow Inner Ring Road project but left incomplete for several years. One "bridge", at Charing Cross, was completed in the 1990s as an office block. The Anderston Footbridge, a pedestrian bridge south of St Patrick's church, was finally completed in 2013 as part of a walking and cycling route.

A third "Bridge to Nowhere" was created in 2008 following the demolition of a hotel a few blocks away from the M8 but its remains were finally removed in 2017.

== Charing Cross Podium ==
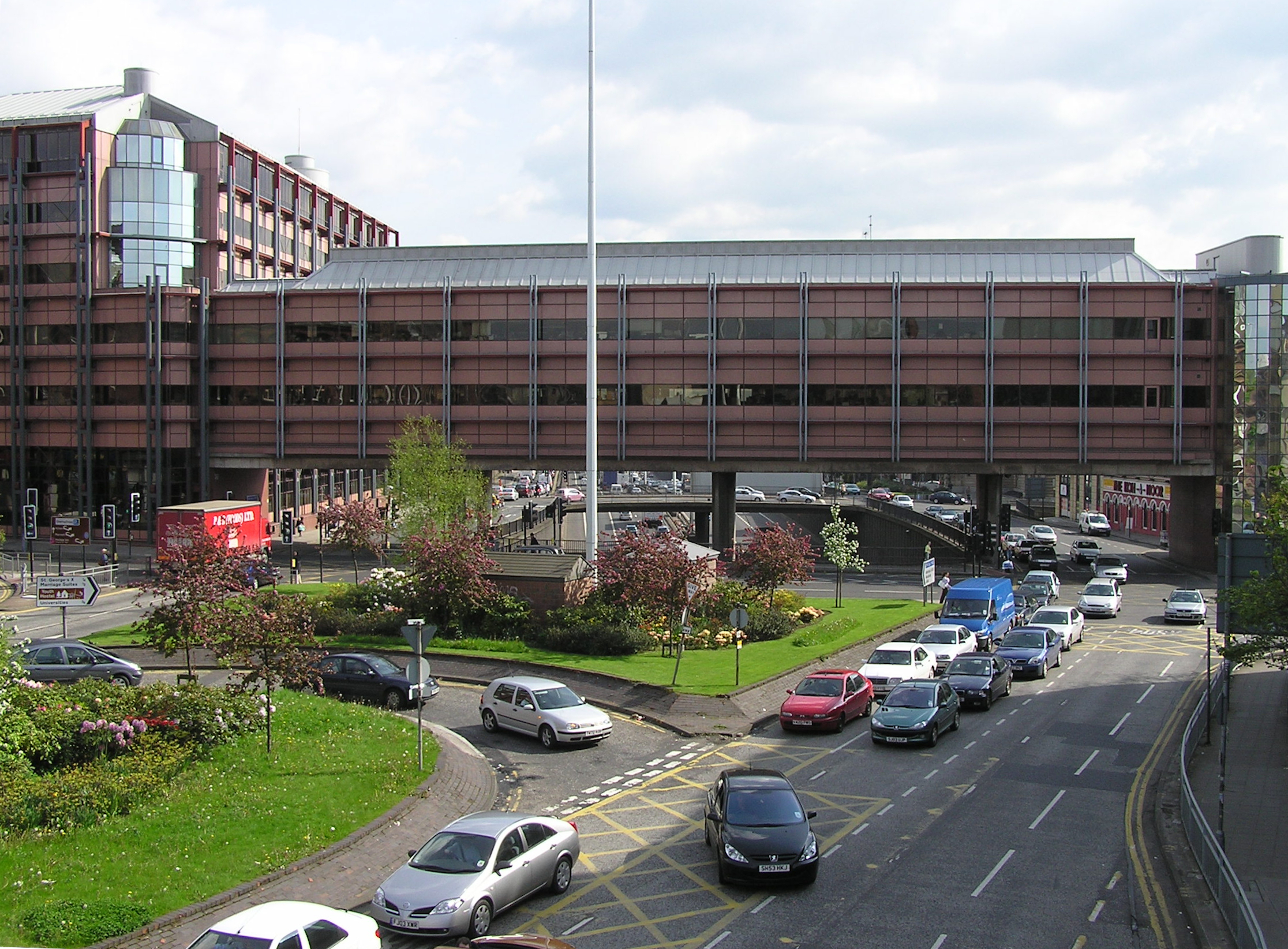
The Charing Cross Podium with Tay House built on the structure

The structure officially called the Charing Cross Podium was always intended to have a development of some sort on the top level. However, the incomplete structure looked like a bridge and was often referred to as the 'Bridge to Nowhere'. When the western flank of the inner ring road was being prepared for tender in the mid-1960s the designer, Scott Wilson & Partners, advised Glasgow Corporation to include the development as part of the motorway construction contract. The Corporation ignored this advice, hoping that a developer would take on the project, along with its cost. The original masterplan for the area was devised by the London architectural firm R. Seifert Company and Partnership, which entailed the construction of two large mixed use commercial complexes in the area: which became the Anderston Centre, and the Charing Cross Complex – part of the latter would be built on the podium structure. In the end, the Charing Cross scheme was pruned back in ambition, leaving the podium unused for over two decades, attracting notoriety at a time when the entire M8 construction project was the subject of very divided public opinion.

The podium, and the adjacent land on Bath Street, were developed in the early 1990s by Malcolm Potier's Tanap Investments. Tay House (300 Bath Street), a salmon pink 160,000-square-foot (15,000-square-metre) office building, was completed in 1992 and a section of the building was built atop the podium. It was later owned by Handelsbanken, MEPC, and now by commercial property company Regional REIT.

Former tenants include the Royal Bank of Scotland and the Criminal Injuries Compensation Board. It is rented to Barclays Stockbrokers, the University of Glasgow, and serviced-office company Regus.

In 2022, Barclays completed the move of its Glasgow operations out of Tay House to its new purpose built campus in the Buchanan Wharf development in Tradeston, south of the River Clyde, thus leaving the building redundant. In August 2023, the owner of the building – London and Scottish Property Investments (L&SPI) – announced the Charing Cross Masterplan in conjunction with Glasgow City Council. The plans entail the partial demolition of Tay House, including the podium structure as part of plans to create a raised garden over the M8 "trench", thus recreating a public space joining the city centre to the West End. The plans also entail the construction of a number of new office developments and, most notably, high-rise student accommodation towers.

== Anderston Footbridge ==
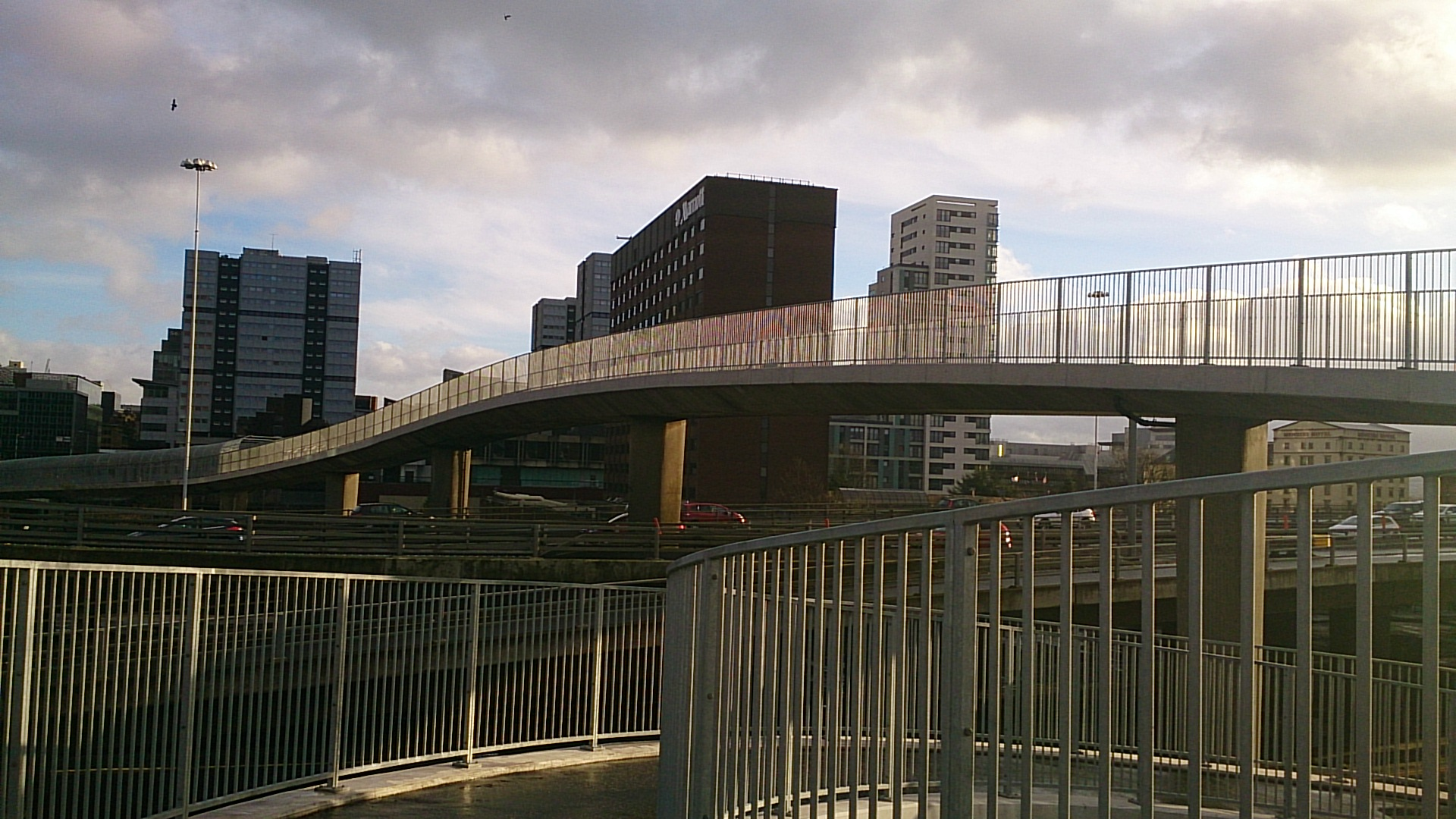
The Anderston Pedestrian Footbridge, looking east, shown following its completion in 2013, with the Anderston Centre tower blocks, Glasgow Marriott and the Argyle Building in the background

The Anderston Footbridge, 600 metres (650 yards) south of the Charing Cross Podium, was originally planned as the main pedestrian connection between the new housing estates on the western side of the motorway to the Anderston Centre but similar to what happened at Charing Cross, the new development was scaled back in size – meaning that the bridge terminated in mid-air above the vacant land, which was eventually built upon in 1981 when a Holiday Inn hotel (nowadays the Glasgow Marriott) was constructed on the site.

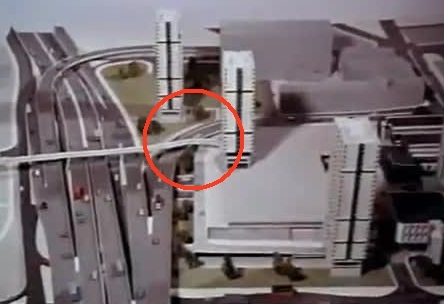
Architect's model from the 1960s of the uncompleted section of the Anderston Centre and the M8 Motorway showing the intended course of the bridge. The red circle shows where the bridge construction was abandoned. The present day Marriott and Hilton hotels now stand on this site.

As a highly visible structure, it assumed the title of 'Bridge to Nowhere' from the Charing Cross Podium after that was built on and lost its bridge-like appearance.

A proposal by charity Sustrans, under their national Connect2 programme, aimed to finish the construction, as well as connecting the bridge with a second one over the Clydeside Expressway. This should increase pedestrian and cycle access to central Glasgow on a route between Kelvingrove Park and the city centre. Sustrans won the funding in September 2011 – work to finally complete the bridge began in 2012 and was completed by July 2013.

== The third bridge ==
Glasgow gained a third "Bridge to Nowhere" in 2008 on a street a few hundred metres to the east of the Anderston Footbridge. The former Albany Hotel was demolished leaving the pedestrian bridge, connecting it to the adjacent Anderston Centre, terminating in mid air over Bishop Lane at the end of Waterloo Street. The hotel was controversially razed in preparation for a new complex called Bothwell Plaza. The hotel development received planning permission in 2009 but remained unbuilt until 2016, when it was reimagined as an office complex called Bothwell Exchange. The remains of the bridge were removed in 2017 when construction on this scheme started.
