= Anderston Centre =

Skyscraper in Glasgow City, Scotland

- Anderston Cross Commercial Centre
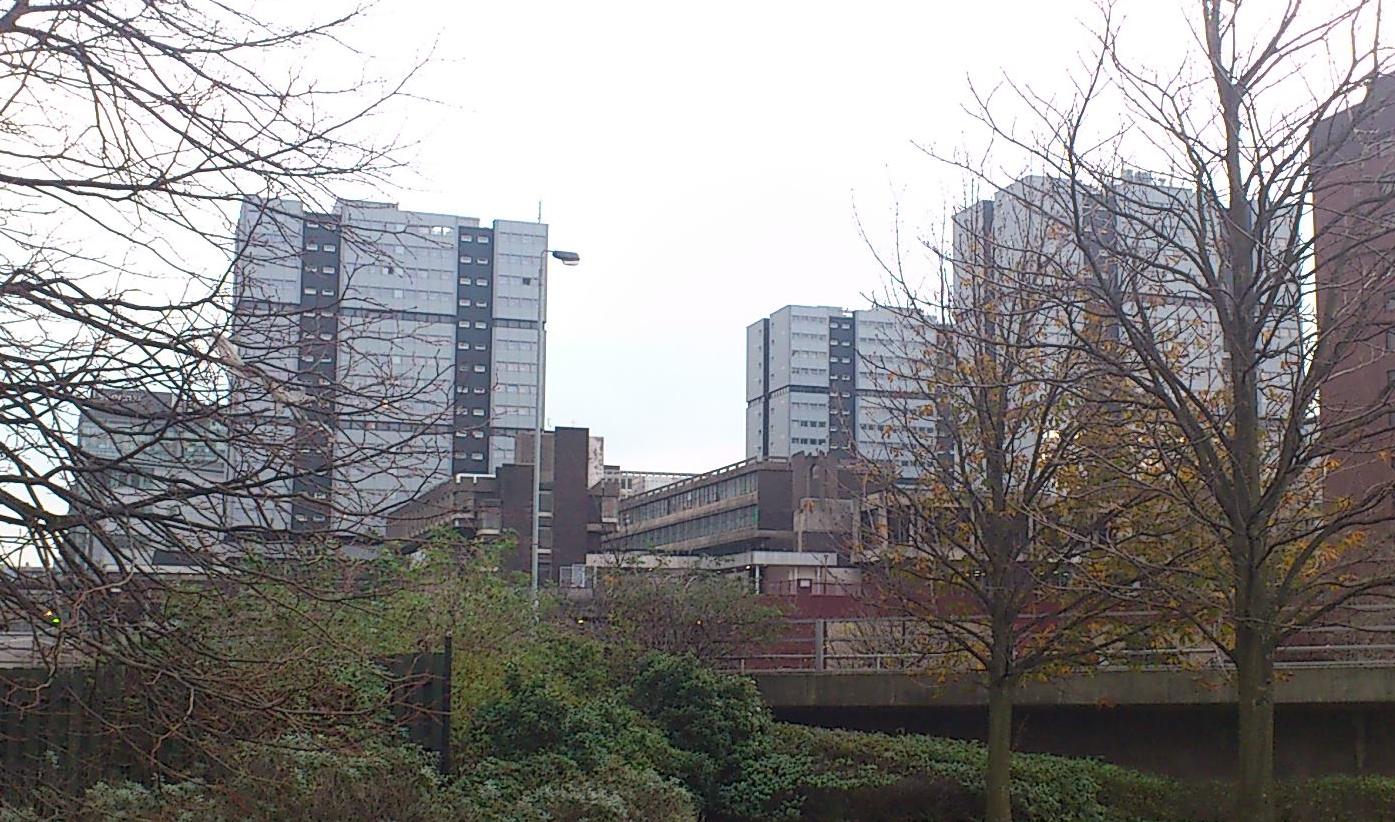
- The Anderston Centre (west elevation) in 2011.
- Interactive map of the Anderston Centre area
- Alternative names: Blythswood Court; Cadogan Square

General information
- Status: Completed
- Type: Mixed-use: residential, office & bus station (former) & car park.
- Architectural style: Brutalist
- Location: Cadogan Street / Argyle Street, Anderston, Glasgow, Scotland
- Coordinates: 55°51′36″N 4°16′0″W
- Construction started: 1968
- Completed: 1972
- Opened: 1973
- Renovated: 1994–present
- Owner: Glasgow City Council; Taylor Wimpey

Height
- Height: 153 feet (47 m)

Technical details
- Structural system: Pre-cast Concrete
- Floor count: 19

Design and construction
- Architect: Richard Seifert
- Main contractor: Myton

The Anderston Centre (originally styled as the Anderston Cross Commercial Centre, but now officially branded as Cadogan Square) is a mixed-use commercial and residential complex, and former bus station located in the Anderston area of Glasgow, Scotland. Completed in 1972 and designed by Richard Seifert (best known for London's famous Centre Point and NatWest Tower), it is one of the earliest examples of the "megastructure" style of urban renewal scheme fashionable in the 1950s and 1960s - the other notable example in Scotland being the infamous Cumbernauld Town Centre development. The complex is a notable landmark on the western edge of Glasgow city centre, and is highly visible from the adjacent Kingston Bridge.

The complex was voted at Position No. 54 in Prospect magazine's 100 best modern Scottish buildings. After falling into partial dereliction in the 1990s, the megastructure has undergone major redevelopment with some elements demolished and replaced, and others comprehensively refurbished.

== History and Construction ==
Following the Bruce Report in 1946, Anderston was declared a Comprehensive Development Area (CDA) by Glasgow Corporation, owing to the area having been badly scarred by the city's industrial decline. Much of the housing in the area had become overcrowded, insanitary and had deteriorated into a slum. The Bruce proposals had called for the construction of a system of inner urban motorway - which would emerge as the Glasgow Inner Ring Road and the Clydeside Expressway. The new Anderston would have its population and slums cleared, and then trisected by these roads into three zones, a Residential Zone on the western side of the motorway, consisting of high-rise deck access public housing blocks, an Industrial Zone on the westernmost extreme bordering with Stobcross and Finnieston, and a Commercial Zone on the eastern side bordering the city centre with Blythswood Hill. Richard Seifert won the commission for the flagship development of the Commercial Zone - which was one of the practice's largest outside London. The plan would be to effectively create a superblock out of the area bounded by Argyle Street, Blythswood Street, Newton Street, and Waterloo Street, and replace the existing buildings with a megastructure which would combine shops, housing, offices and a bus station, which would effectively replace Anderston Cross - the original heart of the area which was literally wiped off the map to make way for the ring road. Seifert's other commission for the area was the Elmbank Gardens office tower built 0.5 km to the north in neighbouring Charing Cross, which also survives to the present day as a hotel.

The core of the complex was based on a multi-level system constructed from pre-cast concrete, connected via sloping walkways and unique open-air escalators, housing a semi-enclosed shopping mall and office space, and a distinctive octagonal shaped leisure complex - which housed a snooker club. These elements were accessed by a travelator from the bus station at the Argyle Street level. The three 19-storey tower blocks housed office space and shops on their lower five levels, with the upper fourteen floors consisting of public housing for Glasgow Corporation. The undercroft of the structure housed a split level car park, and a system of internal roads for service purposes along the former Cadzow Street. Such was the original intended scale of the complex, it had its own dedicated fire station on the north side, adjacent to Waterloo Street. Two high level pedestrian exits from the complex existed to the north and west - the first being to the (now demolished) Albany Hotel on Waterloo Street, the second being the infamous M8 Bridge to Nowhere which was never extended far enough to reach the main deck of the shopping plaza, instead terminating in mid-air some 100 metres away. The three towers were named after the famous Clyde steamers SS St Columba, SS Dalriada and SS Davaar, in reference to Anderston's maritime history as a dockland area, and were collectively known as Blythswood Court.

The eastern end of the complex consisted of an unconnected S-shaped, 9-storey office block (initially known as McIver House, later 1 Cadogan Square), which would frame the operating area of the bus station, exiting onto Douglas Street and Blythswood Street.

== Decline and Demise ==
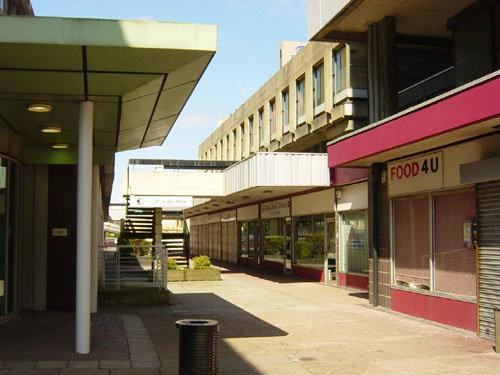
The western end of the Anderston Centre's shopping plaza was largely abandoned and turned into office space

Seifert's scheme was never implemented in its entirety - conceptual drawings of the complex dating from the mid-1960s show a second phase immediately to the west of the first, which had an extended shopping plaza and three additional housing towers. This second phase was never built - the visible evidence of its incompleteness being the unfinished Anderston pedestrian bridge (the infamous 'Bridge to Nowhere') which terminated 100 metres away in midair before its eventual completion as a cycle path in 2013, where it now terminates just to the north west corner of the complex. This section of the site was eventually filled by the Glasgow Marriott and Hilton hotels which were built in 1981 and 1992, respectively.

The location of a bus terminal at Anderston had been predicated as part of the Bruce Report proposals which called for the city centre's numerous bus stations to be consolidated down to just two at either corner of the central area - the other station being Buchanan Bus Station - opening a few years later in 1977. The services from Anderston largely served the city's southern suburbs and surrounding towns, and were intended to make use of the southern flank of the Glasgow Inner Ring Road which was never completed in its intended form. By the end of the 1980s, it had been decided to consolidate all services at the renamed Buchanan Bus Station, and by September 1993, Anderston was closed completely, dealing the final fatal blow to the shopping area of the complex, which was completely abandoned by the middle of the 1990s following the loss of what was essentially the anchor tenant. Other key tenants had previously been Ailsa Superstore which changed to Presto Superstore, the electrical goods chain Comet and the newsagent John Menzies, who also eventually closed as a result of difficult trading conditions. The original studios of the local radio station Radio Clyde had been located within the complex from its foundation, until it moved to its current site in Clydebank in 1983.

Largely unpoliced, the centre's covered service roads and access walkways became a notorious red-light district, becoming a haven for prostitutes and vandals, and the development's once-fashionable bare concrete Brutalist style of architecture aged badly over time, with the half derelict shopping plaza standing as a monument to the failures and mistakes of Glasgow's grand regeneration scheme of the 1960s, and generally became viewed as an eyesore.

Contemporary architectural critics of the period blame the location of the complex as a factor in its failure as a shopping destination, critically being "a few hundred yards too far to the west" to encourage shoppers on Argyle Street beyond the psychological barrier of Central Station and Hielanman's Umbrella. In addition, the opening of the St Enoch Centre in 1989 further consolidated Glasgow's core shopping district in its existing area, leaving the Anderston complex redundant.

== Regeneration ==
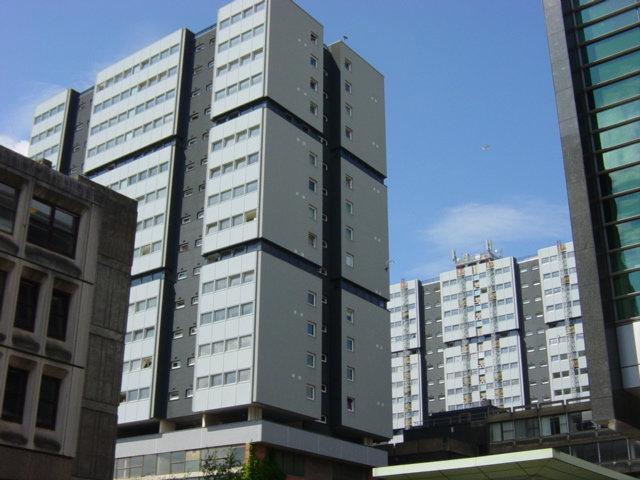
The Davaar and Dalraida tower blocks of the complex undergoing overcladding works in 2010

By the mid-1990s, efforts began to regenerate the complex. Controlled access to the centre's car park and service undercroft was brought into deal with the notorious prostitution problem. The former bus station was built over by the Europa House office building in 1999, and a further office block known as the Cerium Building replaced the northern half of the shopping complex in the early 2000s - this block being occupied by Morgan Stanley.

In 2002, plans were put forward to demolishing the Davaar housing tower of the complex with a view to removing the remaining two at a later stage; this decision was later reversed when a development company removed the southern section of the shopping and commercial centre in 2004 and replaced it with the 20-storey Argyle Building private housing development and Cuprum office block.

In 2008, Glasgow Housing Association begun a plan to refurbish and reclad the blocks, this process was completed in 2011 (after which the properties were transferred to Glasgow West Housing Association), the towers now having distinctive blue LED lighting which automatically comes on during hours of darkness, re-establishing them on the central Glasgow skyline.

Tentative plans exist to remove the remains of the commercial centre, leaving a landscaped area between the three tower blocks, but these have yet to come to fruition. In September 2014, the Scottish Ensemble staged a one-off concert entitled 20th Century Perspectives, in one of the complex's derelict office spaces, in a celebration of Scotland's modernist architecture and 20th Century classical music. The drab and 'dystopian' areas of the complex have also made it a draw for filmmakers, with it making prominent appearances in films such as 2025's The Running Man.

== See also ==
- DoCoMoMo Key Scottish Monuments
- Glasgow tower blocks
- Prospect 100 best modern Scottish buildings
