= Glasgow Inner Ring Road =

Proposed road in Glasgow, Scotland

Coordinates: 55°51′19″N 4°12′13″W

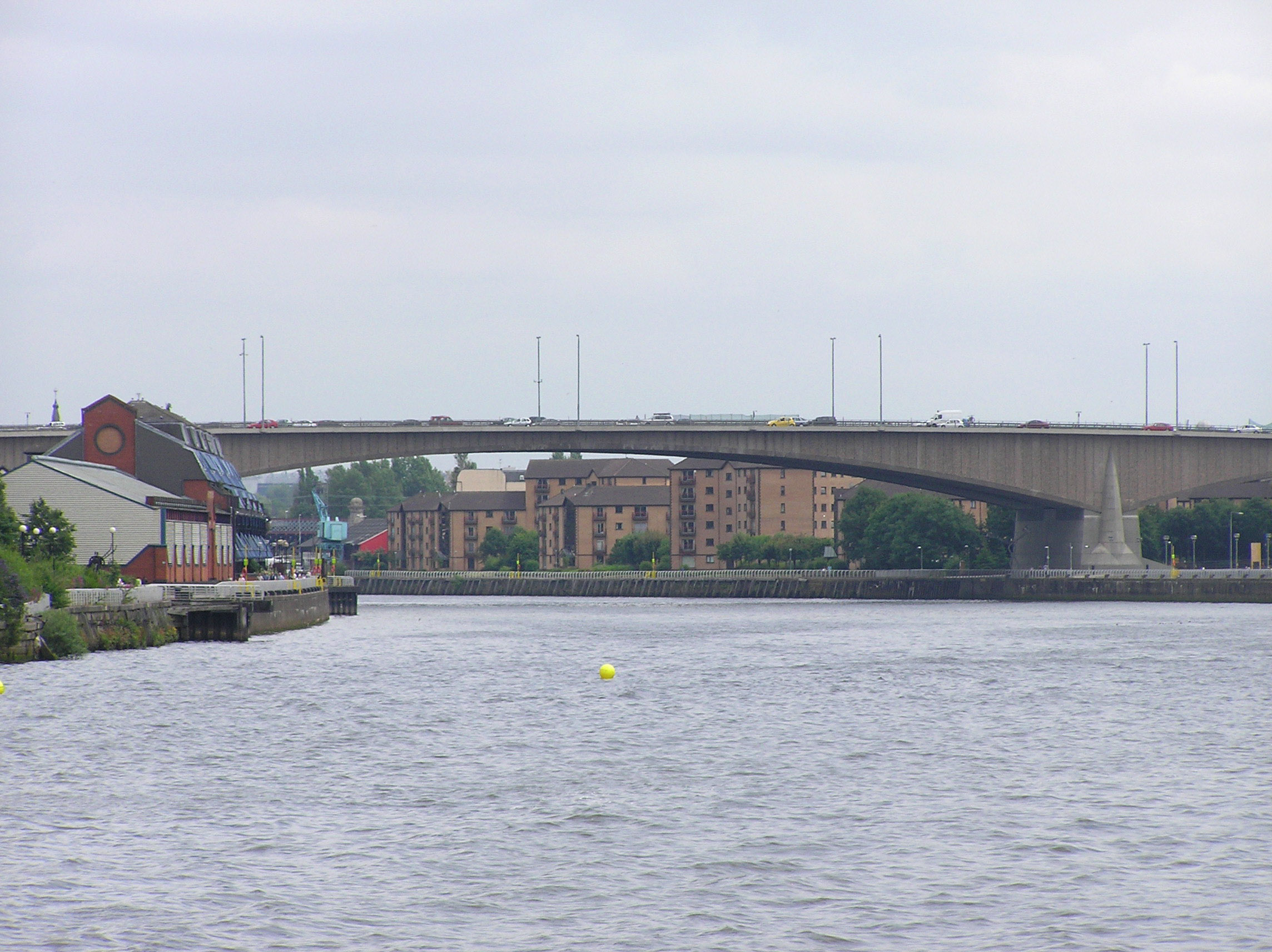
The Kingston Bridge, an integral part of what was planned to become the Glasgow Inner Ring Road.

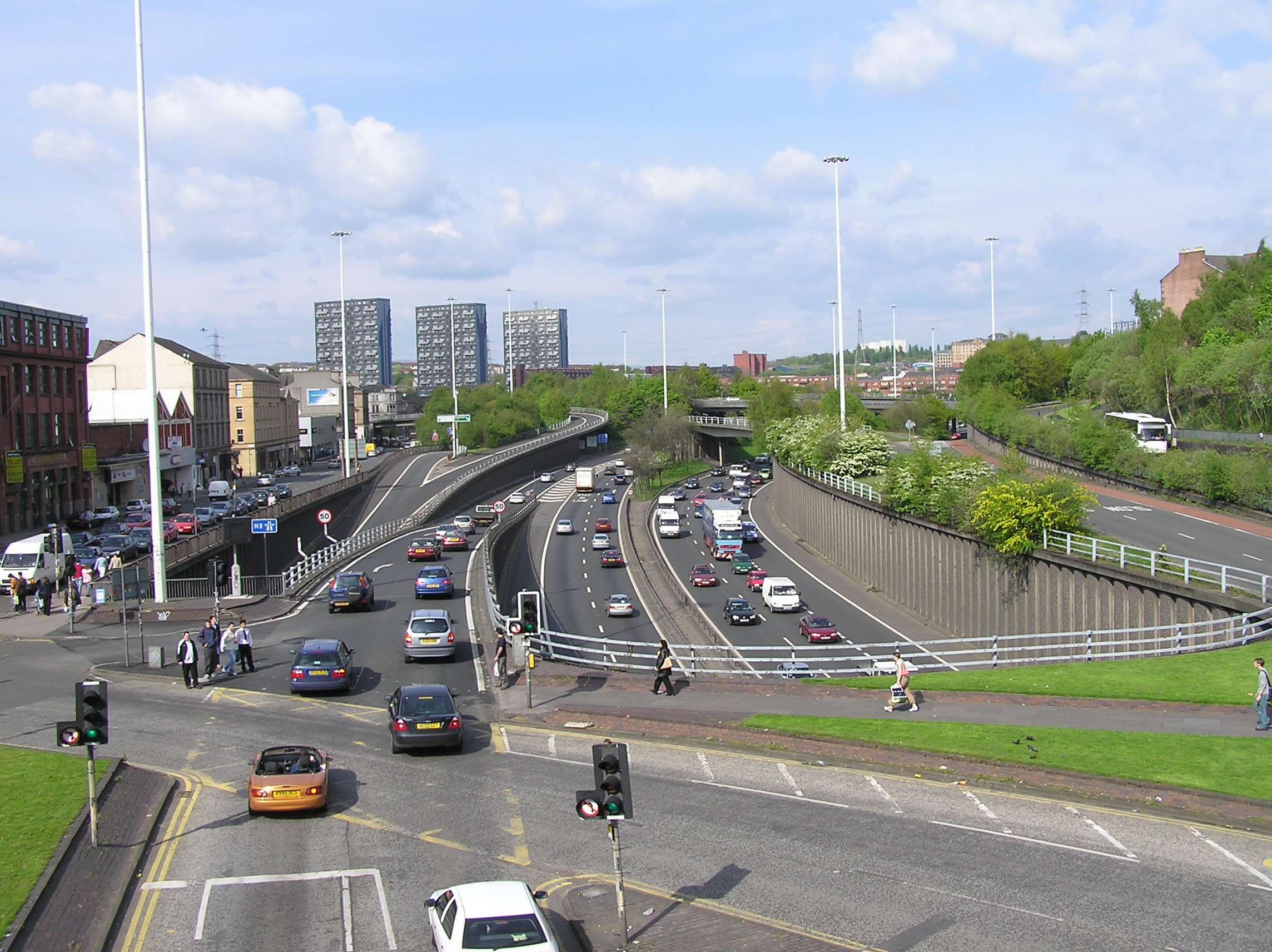
The Glasgow Inner Ring Road (M8) passing beneath Charing Cross

The Glasgow Inner Ring Road is a partially completed ring road encircling the city centre of Glasgow, Scotland. Its construction began in 1965, and half of its length was completed by 1972, forming part of the M8 motorway, but no further construction was made and the remaining plans were formally abandoned in 1980.

After 30 years, a route following roughly the southern section of the proposals was created as the new M74.

== Construction ==
=== The Bruce Report ===
The Bruce Report, a wide-ranging investigation into the post-war regeneration of the city, proposed (in addition to other road plans and a redistribution of rail termini) a system of motorways into and around central Glasgow. At least three new arterial motorways, the Monklands, Renfrew and Maryhill Motorways, would be constructed in towards the city centre, terminating on a new ring road. The ring would take the shape of a "box" around the centre, with four straight flanks and an interchange at each corner for a connection to the perpendicular section of the ring and to the new arterials. At its publication in 1945, much of the Bruce Report was rejected, and it was not until the mid-1950s that the road plans within it were resurrected. After consultation between the Glasgow City Corporation and its traffic consultants Scott Wilson Kirkpatrick & Partners, the basic design of the Bruce proposals were further developed, and the first contracts were awarded to build the northern and western flanks of the ring in four stages; Townhead, Woodside, Charing Cross, Glasgow and Kingston Bridge. Construction of the flanks began in 1965.

=== North and west flanks ===
The north flank of the ring (the Townhead and Woodside sections) runs between an interchange at St George's Cross in Woodside and an interchange at Townhead, passing through the districts of Garnethill and Cowcaddens.The entire section was elevated over the surrounding land on a split-level concrete viaduct - the split level design was to allow for the proposed (and unbuilt) Maryhill Motorway to join the ring road via a flyover junction sandwiched between the two carriageways. The evidence of the intended position of the westbound exit/entry ramp can still be seen between Junctions 16 and 17 at Port Dundas.

The first contract was awarded for the Townhead section and it was the first section completed, opening in April 1968. The Woodside Section completed the North Flank in May 1971.

The west flank (the Charing Cross and Kingston Bridge sections) was planned to run from the St George's Cross interchange, sweeping beneath Charing Cross and through Anderston before rising to cross the River Clyde and run to an interchange at Tradeston. The river crossing, whose feasibility had been considered even before the proposal of the ring road, was completed in June 1970 and opened by Queen Elizabeth, the Queen Mother. The Charing Cross section completing the link to St George's Cross was made in February 1972, marking the end of the originally contracted work. The North and West Flanks form 2.5 miles of motorway, built at a cost of around £27 million.

The construction of the road greatly reduced the amount of traffic travelling through the city centre, and one of the lasting legacies of the project was that it allowed for the removal of traffic and therefore the pedestrianisation of Buchanan Street, and the central sections of Argyle and Sauchiehall Streets which took place between 1975 and 1977, to create a continuous shopping area devoid of cars.

In 1993 the conservation organisation DoCoMoMo listed the completed sections of the inner ring road as one of the sixty key Scottish monuments of the post-war period.

=== Junctions with existing and proposed roads ===
At the Townhead (north-east) interchange, a complex grade separated junction was laid out to connect the North Flank of the ring to three roads proposed or under construction (the East Flank, the A803 Springburn Expressway, and to the Monklands Motorway to carry traffic out of the city to the east and on to Edinburgh) and to the existing A8 road towards Dennistoun and Glasgow Cross. The entire project entailed the construction of ten bridges and six pedestrian subways with over 5,000 feet of interconnecting passages.

The south-western interchange at Tradeston was built to incorporate connections to the South Flank and to the Renfrew Motorway to carry traffic out of the city westwards to Greenock and Glasgow Airport. Additional links were provided for surface roads including those to Kinning Park and the Gorbals.

Further junctions were provided with existing roads in and out of the centre at Cowcaddens, to the Great Western Road (A82), to streets in the upmarket business district, and to the new A814 Clydeside Expressway. A Maryhill Motorway (which would have been designated the M82) was also proposed which would take the strain from the A82 and would have acted as an arterial route to the North West. The split-level section of the M8 between Cowcaddens and St George's Cross was designed to accommodate this.

=== East and South Flanks ===
Plans for the South and East Flanks were never finalised, but it is known that the South Flank would have interchanged with the A77 at Eglinton Street. Both flanks would have been elevated and met in the Gorbals or Laurieston.

The East Flank would have taken a course directly south from the Townhead interchange, and driven a path directly along, or parallel to the historic High Street in what is now the Merchant City. It is likely that similar destruction as was witnessed in Charing Cross and Anderston for the construction of the Western flank would have taken place, endangering historic buildings such as Glasgow Royal Infirmary, the Provand's Lordship and the Tolbooth clock tower at Glasgow Cross.

The legacy of the proposals still exists in terms of land that was compulsorily purchased by the Corporation at the time; for example the old College Goods Yard (part of the City of Glasgow Union Railway) was acquired and was used as an open air car park until built upon in 2011 by the Glasgow Collegelands office development.

== Abandonment ==
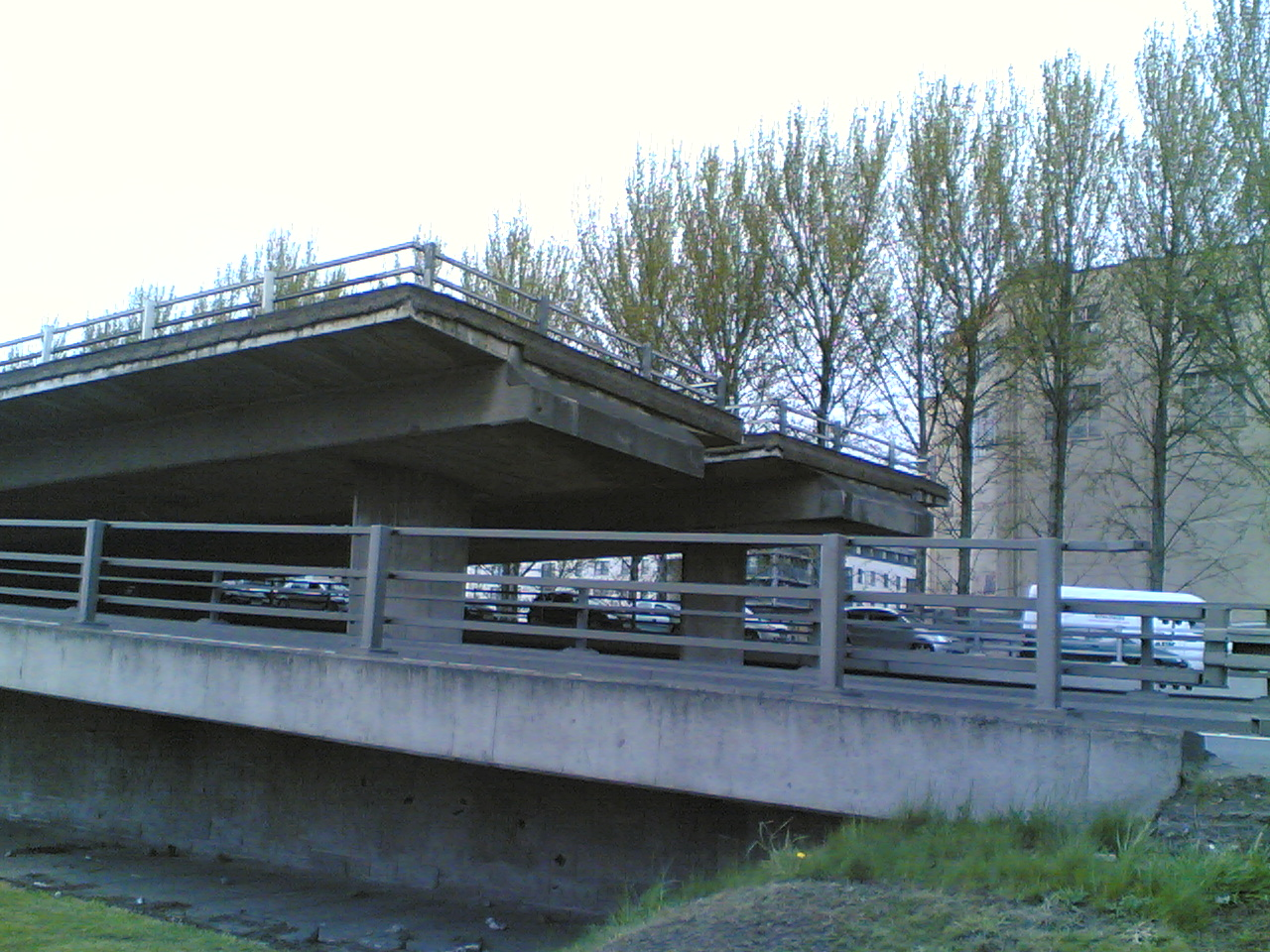
An incomplete junction at what would have been the south-west corner of the ring, known locally as the "ski jump".

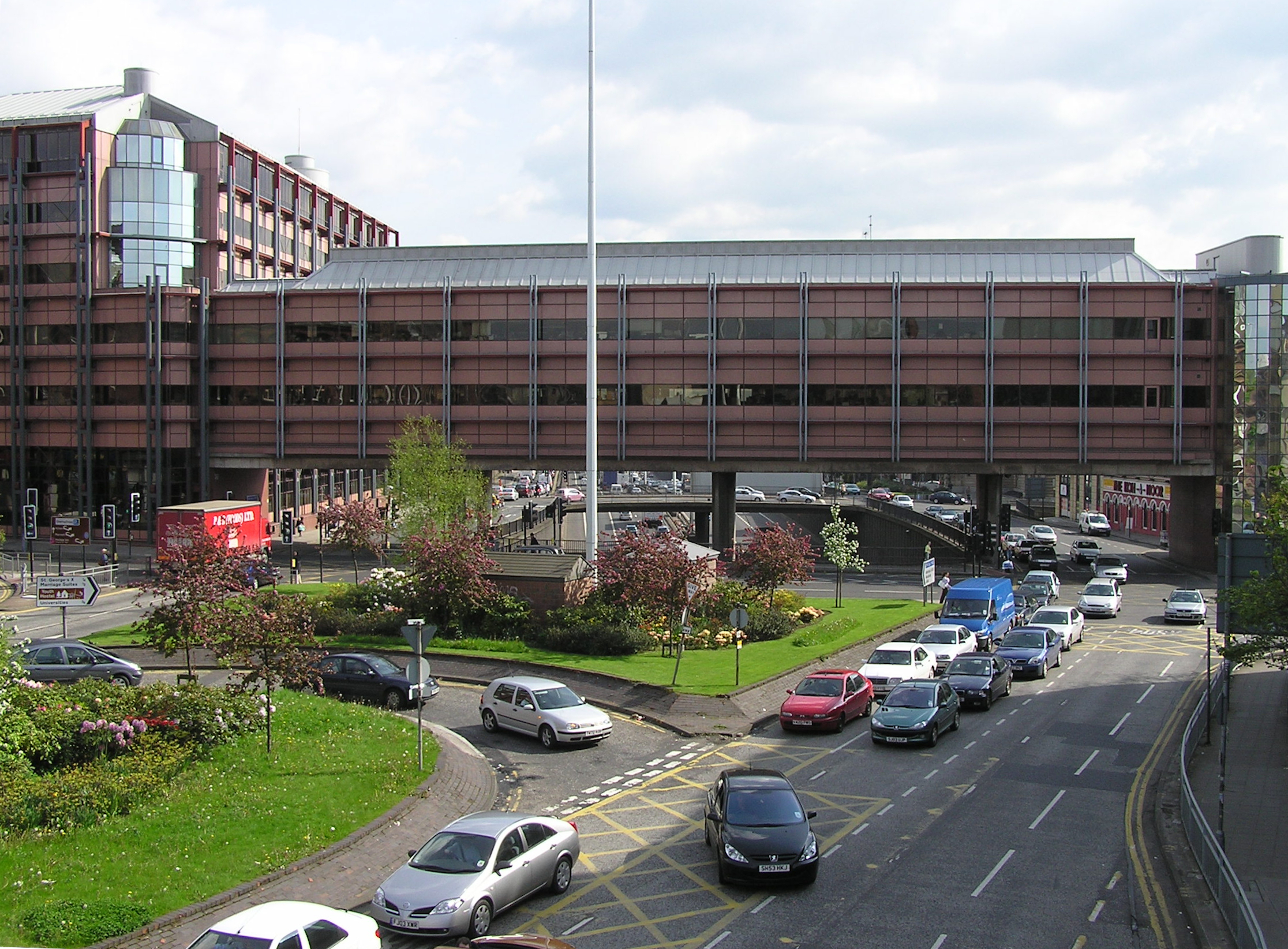
The infamous "Bridge to Nowhere" is now furbished with an office block. Only the part directly over the road constituted the original bridge.

Although the Monklands and Renfrew Motorways were constructed (in 1975 and 1977 respectively), plans for the other two sides of the ring along with those for the Maryhill Motorway to the northwest were all shelved in 1980, amidst public protests against their construction on the basis of the damage done to the environment and appearance of the city. Whilst the Townhead and Cowcaddens sections had largely been driven through areas of slum clearance, the Charing Cross section came in for harsh criticism when many properties in Anderston and Garnethill were demolished - some of which were cherished examples of Victorian and Edwardian architecture - to facilitate the massive trench through which the motorway ran; critics condemned the works as a "massacre". When the East and South Flanks were eventually abandoned, the UK government confirmed that the scheme would be the last motorway built through a city in the United Kingdom.

Some loose ends were left behind because of the abandonment. Amongst the most infamous examples are the access to the unbuilt south section at Tradeston which was left as a "ski-jump" (the road abruptly terminates in mid-air, and has remained so despite the 2010 M74 extension, as other plans were used to link the roads), the tangle of slip-roads at Tradeston, and the two infamous "Bridges to Nowhere"; a concrete podium over the Charing Cross section that was left empty for nearly 20 years before finally acting as a base for an office building constructed in the early 1990s (this was always its intended purpose although it had the appearance of an overbridge) and a pedestrian bridge over the carriageways that terminated in mid air as a result of the incompleteness of the adjacent Anderston Centre commercial complex. Signs saying "Ring Road" were still displayed both above and on the approaches to the central section until the mid 1990s. The Anderston pedestrian bridge was finally completed in 2013 when it was joined to Waterloo Street as part of a cycle route.

The M8 is consistently jammed at rush hour, with the Kingston Bridge having to cope with vast amounts of traffic that would have been redirected to other roads had the ring been completed; this traffic load has necessitated extensive roadworks on the bridge, amplifying congestion. The motorway is derided in popular culture, with Glasgow-based pop band Deacon Blue's album Raintown largely forming an attack on the inner-city atmosphere of the road, and including a picture of it cutting through the city on the rear cover.

== Resurrection and Future developments ==
Increasing traffic levels have led to several proposals to complete the unfinished ring, this along with other developments is shaping the future for the inner ring road.

=== Southern section ===
Plans published by the Scottish Executive in 2003 proposed the extension of the M74 motorway from its former terminus in the south-east of the city towards the Kingston Bridge. This motorway passes through Polmadie and the Gorbals – on elevated sections like the original preliminary plans for the South Flank, and meets the M8 at Tradeston, a few hundred metres south of the planned interchange leaving the 'ski-jump' untouched. The plans went to public inquiry in 2004, and although it rejected the plans, then-Transport Minister Nicol Stephen approved them. The project was stalled by legal challenges which collapsed in June 2006, paving the way for the road to be constructed. The road opened to traffic in June 2011.

=== Eastern section ===
The East End Regeneration Route, originally a proposal to supplement the East Flank, has been championed by Glasgow City Council as the preferred solution for completion of the ring. The plans are for a road linking the M74 extension to the M8 at the Provan Gas Works, about 2 km (1 1/4 mi) east of the interchange at Townhead. It is extremely unlikely that this section would be built to motorway standard; instead the road would form an urban corridor, part of which exists as a road bypassing Parkhead built in 1988 as part of The Forge shopping centre. The road is proposed to run through Hogarth Park (where a former railway embankment is now used as public open space), Haghill and Carntyne, beneath the A8 Edinburgh Road, continuing along a disused railway alignment to Provan. Construction work began in early 2010. As of April 2014, the route has been completed between the M74 extension and the Parkhead bypass. The remaining section, from the Parkhead Bypass to the M8, was intended to be constructed after the 2014 Commonwealth Games. However no work had been carried out as of August 2021 instead traffic for the M8 is directed along the existing road network.

=== Northern section ===
On 18 February 2026 Transport Scotland launched a Public consultation on the future of the Woodside Viaducts with three options being considered for the stretch of urban motorway: repair, replace, or remove. The consolation closes on 25 March 2026 and will impact the motorway's future in this area.

=== Other initiatives ===
In late 2005, after years of planning, Glasgow City Council began work on a new road bridge, the Clyde Arc, (commonly known locally as the "Squinty Bridge") over the Clyde alongside the Kingston which connects Finnieston on the north bank to Kinning Park on the south. The first new road crossing of the Clyde in Glasgow since the Kingston Bridge in 1970, the new structure is intended to divert local traffic away from using the M8 to cross the river. It opened in September 2006. On the night of 14 January 2008, one of the support cables snapped, closing the Clyde Arc for all traffic for months. It reopened in June 2008.

In 2019, Glasgow City Council put forward plans to cover over the infamous "trench" through Charing Cross and Anderston with a raised garden, in an attempt to create a new public space in the area and to reconnect the communities in Anderston and the West End which saw their direct link to the city centre severed by the motorway. The proposals were further expanded in the 2023 Charing Cross Masterplan published by Glasgow City Council. As well as the aforementioned garden plans, several of the 1970s-era office blocks constructed at the same time as the motorway will be demolished to make way for replacement commercial developments and high-rise student housing towers.
