= Bruce Report =

Plan for redevelopment of Glasgow

The Bruce Report (or the Bruce Plan) is the name commonly given to the First Planning Report to the Highways and Planning Committee of the Corporation of the City of Glasgow published in March 1945. It influenced an intensive programme of regeneration and rebuilding efforts which took place in the city and surroundings from the mid-1950s and lasted until the late 1970s. The author was Robert Bruce, Glasgow Corporation Engineer at the time.

A few years later in 1949 the Scottish Office in Edinburgh issued its rival Clyde Valley Regional Plan 1946 ('CVP'). This was authored by a team led by Sir Patrick Abercrombie and Robert H Matthew and disagreed with the Bruce Report in a number of important areas. In particular the CVP recommended an overspill policy for Glasgow and the rehousing of much of the population in new towns outside the city. The Bruce Report preferred rebuilding and rehousing within the city boundary. The friction and debate between the supporters and spheres of influence for these two reports led to a series of initiatives designed to transform the city over the following fifty years.

Some of the Bruce Report initiatives were put into practice; others were not. The report and its implementation significantly shaped modern day Glasgow. The most prominent impact of the report is the M8 motorway, and the system of arterial roads within the central area of the city which was built following proposals in the report. Also the mid-20th century policy of resettling much of the city's population through the mass demolition of tenement slums and their replacement with peripheral housing schemes arose from recommendations in the Bruce Report, reflecting Glasgow Corporation's resistance to overspill and new towns until it co-operated in the designation of Cumbernauld new town in 1956.

The civic, economic, political, architectural, geographic and demographic landscape of modern Glasgow would have been radically different without the influence of these two reports. Had the Bruce Report itself been implemented unaltered in its entirety, the city today would probably have been unrecognisable.

== City Centre ==
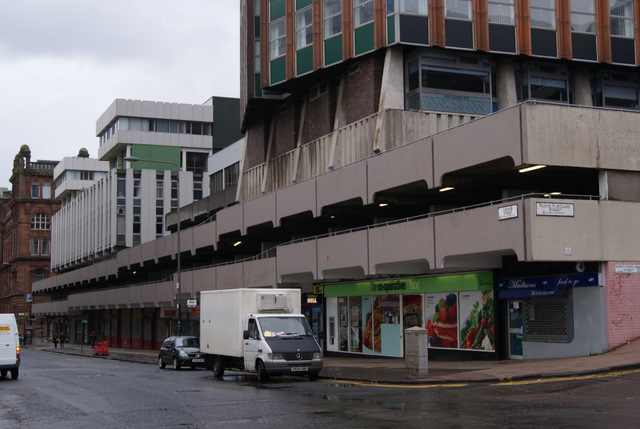
Commercial developments built in the early 1960s such as this one on George Street were typical of those influenced by the Bruce Report's findings. This complex – now occupied by Strathclyde University – replaced a block of slum tenements.

Central to the Bruce Report's recommendations were a set of radical proposals which amounted to wholesale demolition of a large section of the city centre. These would have involved knocking down many historic and architecturally important Victorian and Georgian buildings. The report advocated rebuilding most of the city centre to a single design with the aim of creating a coherently planned city. Part of this plan involved removing residential dwellings from the central area and replacing them with commercial developments that would house new service industries, while the city's Victorian grid plan of streets would almost be completely re-arranged into a structured series of "zones" containing distinct spaces for city functions such as housing, commerce, and education.

Among the buildings earmarked for demolition by Bruce were many which are now regarded as Glasgow's most significant architectural assets. These included Glasgow Central Station, The Kelvingrove Art Gallery and Museum, Glasgow School of Art, designed by the renowned architect Charles Rennie Mackintosh and the Glasgow City Chambers and the Glasgow Royal Infirmary. Bruce's justification for these radical proposals was the creation of a new "healthy and beautiful city" based on formal 1950s architecture. Ultimately less draconian measures were sought for the regeneration of the city centre.

Although the proposals for the city centre were rejected, the later concept of the Comprehensive Development Area (CDA) can trace its roots directly to the Bruce Report. In the 1950s, Glasgow Corporation designated CDAs as districts suffering from severe overcrowding and insanitary housing, where the only solution would be total demolition and rebuilding. Of the 29 CDAs which the Corporation identified, three of them – Anderston, Cowcaddens and Townhead – lay partially within the city centre and succumbed to almost total destruction to make way for new roads, high-rise housing and concrete office buildings.

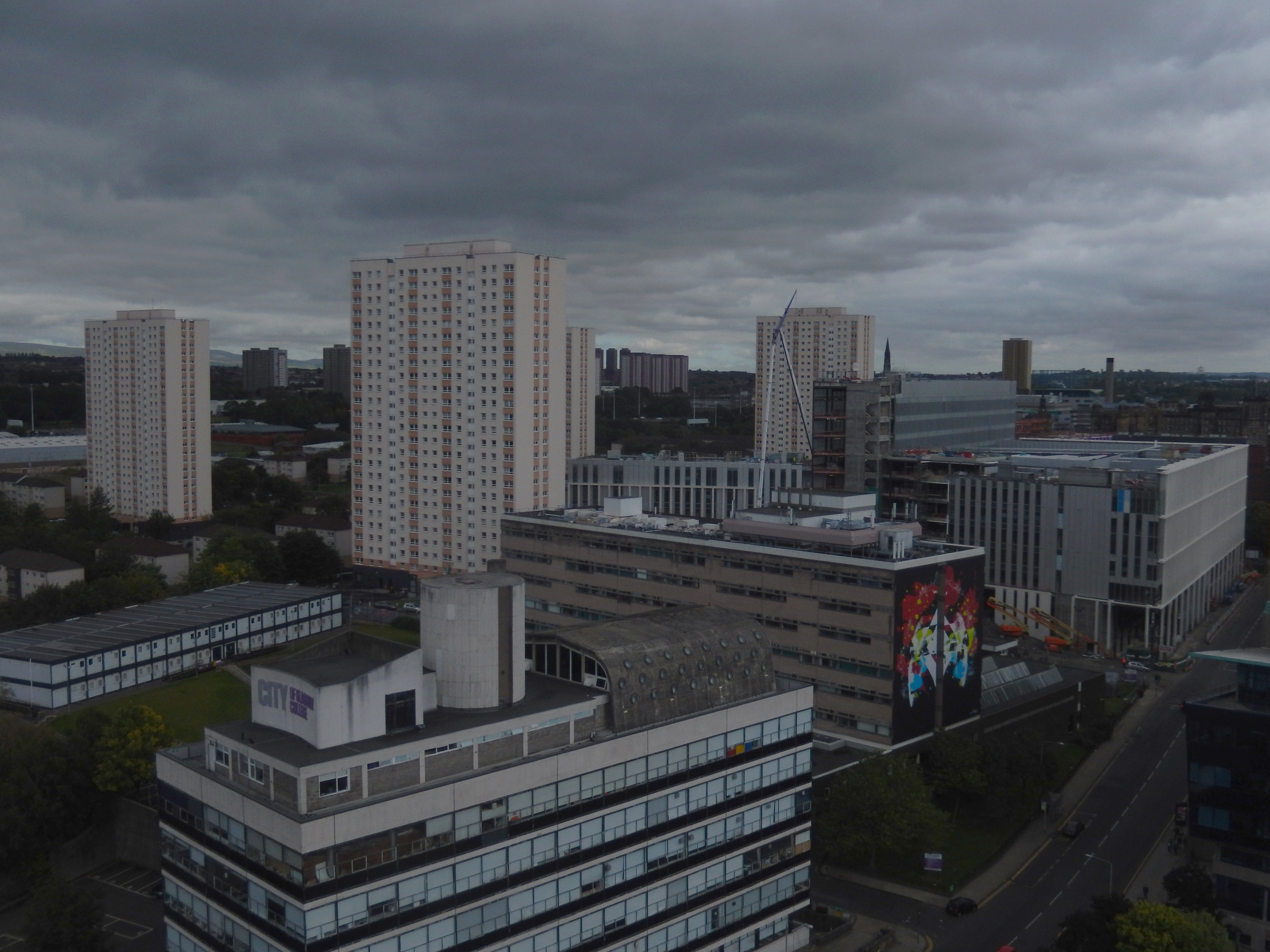
Townhead's new educational quarter, with buildings such as the Central College of Commerce (foreground) evolved from the ideas contained within the Bruce Report

In Townhead, parts of Cowcaddens and in the north eastern extremity of the city centre – echoes of the Bruce proposals were seen in the area's transformation into an educational quarter centred around the new University of Strathclyde (created out of the former Royal College of Science and Technology) and several supporting further education colleges such as the Central College of Commerce and College of Building and Printing (both constructed in the early 1960s) and Glasgow College of Technology in the early 1970s. Large swathes of tenement housing along with the original street grid (most notably, the area's main thoroughfare – Parliamentary Road) were almost completely destroyed to make way for the new college and university campuses together with lower density housing accompanied with wide open and landscaped areas between.

In Anderston, entire communities were wiped off the map to make way for the controversial ring road (see below) as well as commercial office developments on the western edge of the city centre – new buildings such as Elmbank Gardens and the Anderston Centre being prime examples.

== Rehousing Glasgow's slum population ==
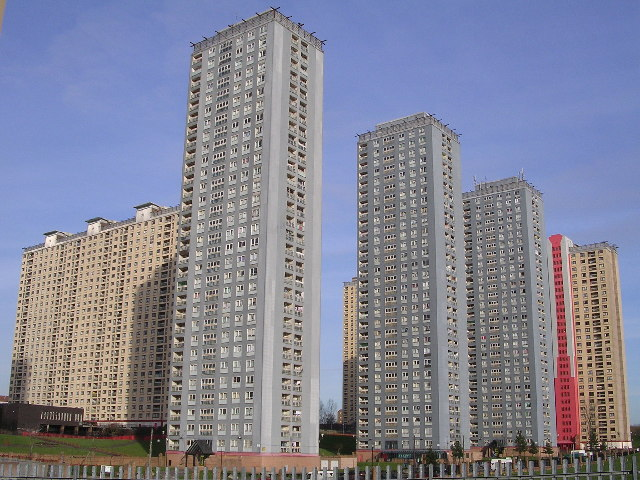
The housing proposals of the Bruce Report were among the most controversial aspects. It inspired the mass construction of high rise estates around the city such as the infamous Red Road development pictured above.

One proposal in the report was implemented almost in its entirety: the demolition of Glasgow's slum housing. Bruce suggested that many of Glasgow's residential areas be torn down, as a great many of these unplanned developments had become slums. He proposed that their inhabitants be rehoused in new developments on the periphery of the city. The key goals of this proposal was the creation of a less densely populated city and a greater quality of life for its inhabitants. Beginning in the 1950s Glasgow's clearance programme relocated some 300,000 of the city's population. New towns, such as East Kilbride and Cumbernauld were created in the areas surrounding the city as part of this redevelopment. The programme also involved the creation of new outer suburbs on the fringes of the city boundaries such as Castlemilk, Pollok, Milton, Drumchapel and Easterhouse, all of which are on the edges of the city. Although the Bruce Report in itself did not precisely specify the manner in which its housing proposals should be implemented, the city fathers would ultimately look to the ideas of the French architect Le Corbusier for their inspiration in how those goals should be achieved. The end result was the mass construction of numerous high-rise tower block estates on green belt sites within the city boundaries.

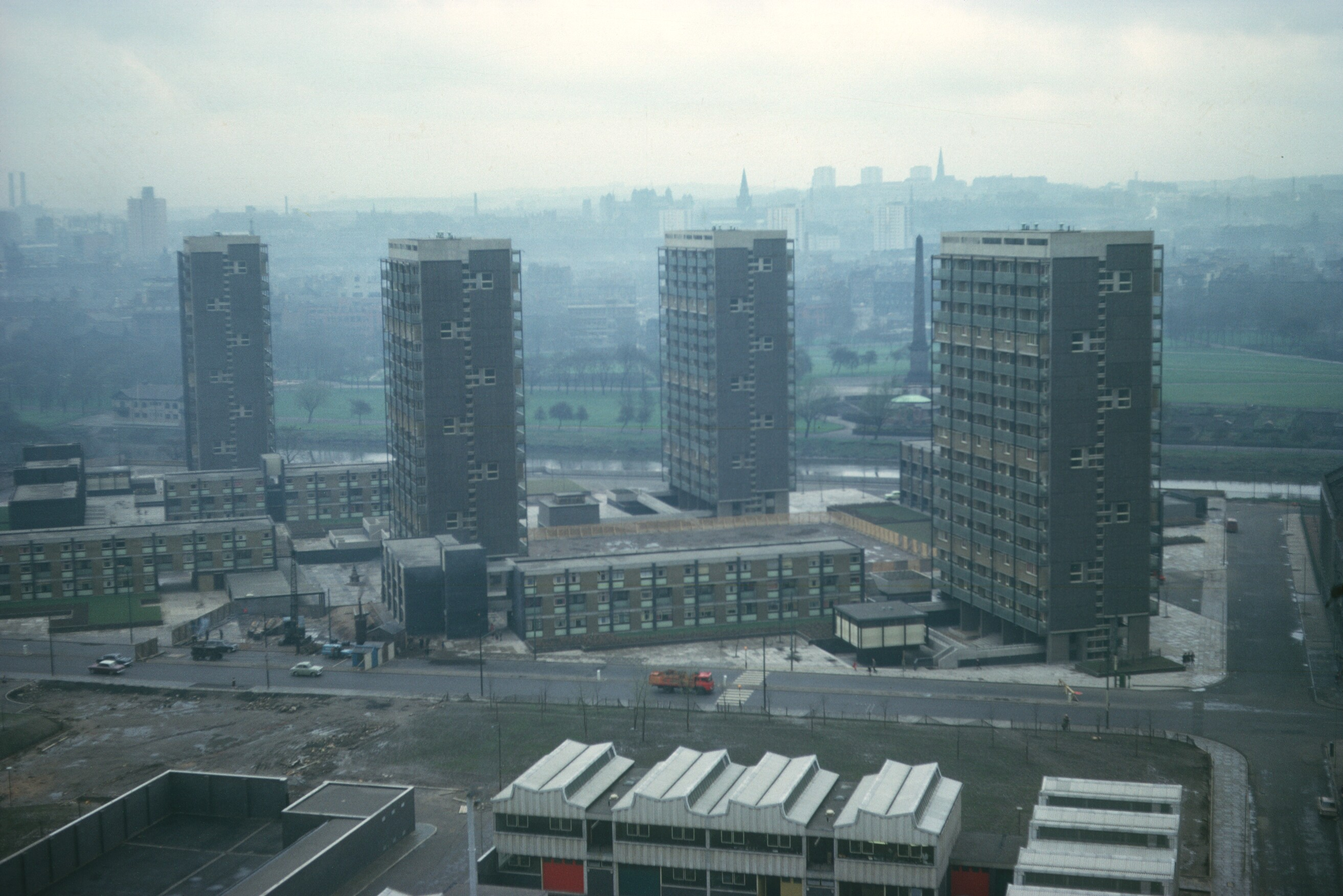
The Gorbals was the best known of the Comprehensive Development Areas, in which all of its tenement housing was destroyed in the 1960s to make way for high-rise housing schemes such as the Hutchesontown "B" estate, pictured here in 1983

As with most other aspects of the city's redevelopment, the housing clearances were not carried out exactly to Bruce's proposed plan. Bruce wanted all of Glasgow's citizens to be rehoused within the city boundaries. In building the new towns, a significant portion of the city's population were moved outwith the jurisdiction of the Glasgow Corporation. This resulted in a dramatic reduction in the city's reported population between the start of the 20th and 21st centuries. The area's actual population increased during this period and the urban spread of Glasgow now covers a much larger area than it did at the start of the 20th century. Bruce's underlying aim of a less densely populated city was ultimately achieved. At its peak in the 1930s Glasgow's inner city population was 1.1 million, today it is roughly 600,000. Glasgow remains Scotland's largest city however, with the population of Greater Glasgow close to 1.8 million and the entire Greater Glasgow conurbation is now 2.3 million. 44% of Scotland's entire population. The 'social engineering' which underpinned the new housing schemes, has been largely concluded as being a failure by contemporary historians; since many of the planned suburbs quickly developed social problems and deteriorated into slums themselves by the 1980s. Many of the new housing blocks and multi-storey towers were cheaply built using pre-fabricated concrete construction systems which were ill-suited to Glasgow's inclement climate, and as a result, suffered excruciating damp and severe structural problems which rendered them unfit for human habitation. Some of the estates, most notably those in Pollok, Milton and Easterhouse, have either been demolished completely or are earmarked for eventual clearance.

The final tower blocks built as part of the Comprehensive Development Areas were completed in 1978, just when it was becoming clear that elements of the housing policy was starting to fail, less draconian measures were adopted for future regeneration and improvement of the city's social housing. One of the most notable was the Glasgow Eastern Area Renewal (GEAR) initiative, which took place in parts of the East End between 1976 and 1988. Tenement buildings were externally sandblasted to remove decades of pollution damage, and inside two dwellings were knocked through to create a single flat – this allowing outside toilets to be removed and modern central heating systems installed. This was then repeated throughout the city to the point where many tenements became desirable private housing.

In 2005, the newly formed Glasgow Housing Association began a 15-year demolition programme of the worst of the tower blocks, which included many of the once flagship developments such as Red Road, Sighthill, Hutchesontown in the Gorbals, and the Bluevale/Whitevale estate in the East End.

== Transport ==
The scope of Bruce's proposals was not limited to housing reform, Glasgow's transport infrastructure was also a target for change. Bruce proposed that quality, high speed transport links were vital if the city was going to transition to a service based economy against the background of a declining industrial base.

=== Roads ===
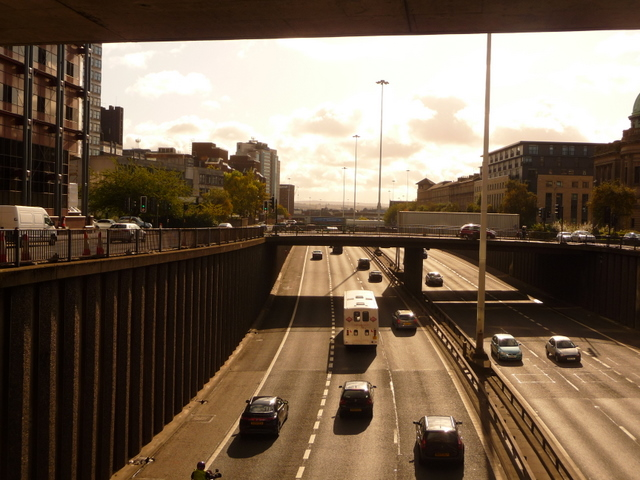
The M8 Motorway is the most visible legacy of the Bruce Report in the centre of Glasgow. It forms two sides of an incomplete inner ring road around the city centre

Bruce proposed the creation of a system of arterial motorways into the city converging to form a Glasgow Inner Ring Road – a motorway "box" which would have encircled the city centre. The proposed network included a Renfrew motorway, a Monklands motorway, a Maryhill motorway, a Stirling motorway and a south eastern motorway connecting Glasgow with the wider motorway network. These proposals were not acted on until the 1960s when the initiative began as a sweeping programme of clearing and construction. The Monklands and Renfrew motorways were completed forming what is now known as the M8. These two motorways form the northern and western flanks of the planned ring road. However carving a motorway through long standing communities – much of Charing Cross and a swathe of Anderston were completely destroyed in its construction – caused such protest that the rest of the Inner Ring Road initiative was shelved. The Stirling motorway became the present day M80 and its initial Glasgow section was openened in 1992 as the Stepps bypass, and the complete route through Cumbernauld was fully opened in 2011.

An extension to the M74 into the city centre to meet the M8 motorway was completed in June 2011. This will see the completion of the southern section of Bruce's planned ring road, albeit on a marginally different route than originally proposed.

Bruce's report recommended that the Eastern flank of the Inner Ring Road be constructed along the route of Glasgow's High Street. Again this would have necessitated the demolition of many properties, including some of historic and/or architectural value. It was shelved in the face of strong local opposition.

Although not directly part of the Bruce Report, the wider plans for the Monkland Motorway contained proposals to create a South Link Motorway which would have continued south from the Stirling Motorway terminus at Provan Gas Works and bisected the East End to link with the M74. This proposal has eventually evolved into the Glasgow East End Regeneration Route. This plan proposes a road (not a motorway) which would link the M74 to the M8 through the East End of Glasgow. If successfully implemented this plan together with the M74 extension would effectively see Bruce's planned inner ring completed.

There are no signs that the Bruce Plan's proposed Maryhill motorway will ever be implemented in any way. Bruce's proposals for a ring road with four arterial routes running off it seems unlikely to ever be fully realised.

=== Public transport ===
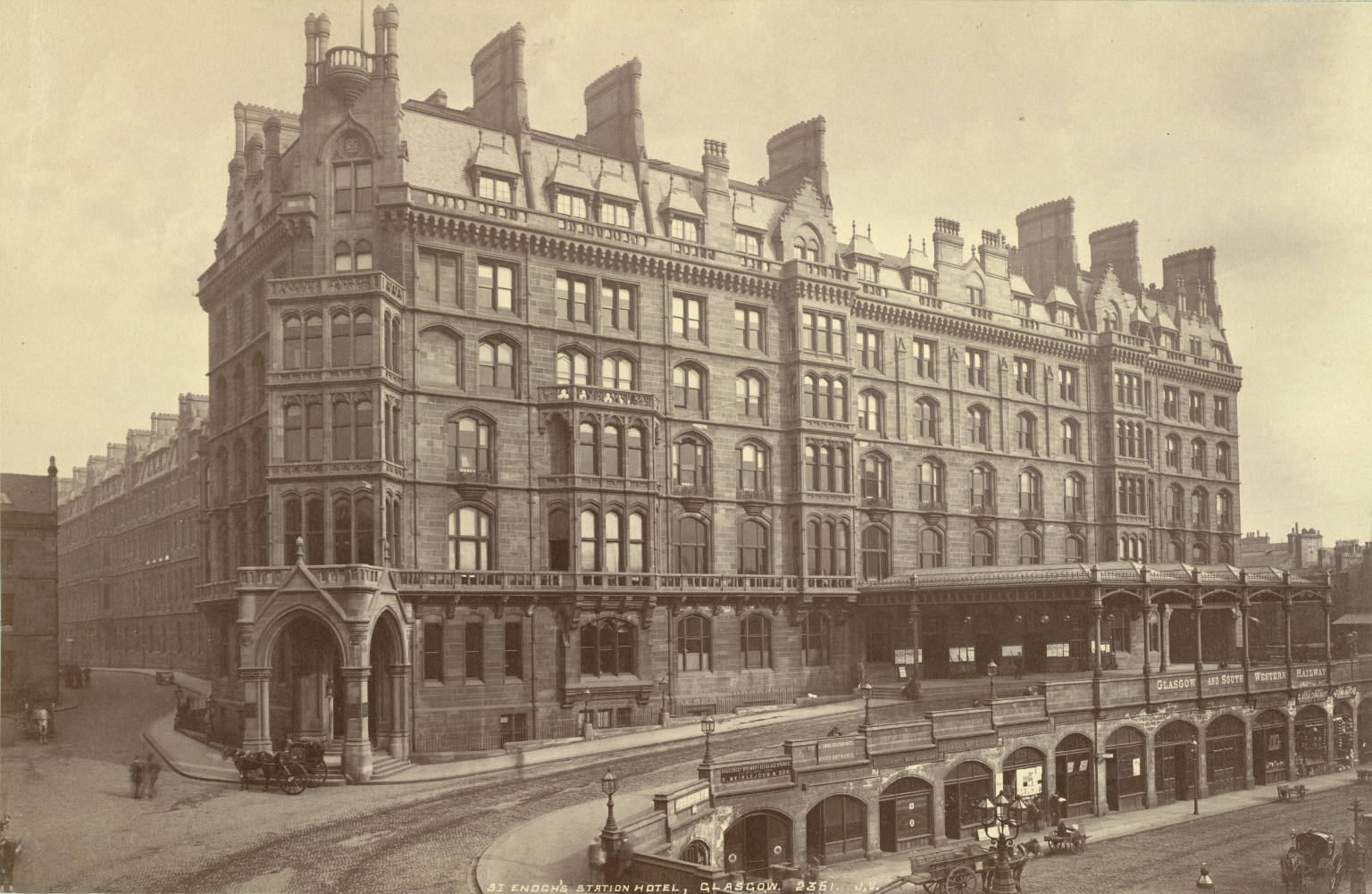
The demolished St Enoch railway station

As well as recommending changes to Glasgow's road network, Bruce also suggested radical changes to Glasgow's railways. At the time of the Bruce Report, the city had four major railway stations. Central and St Enoch both served primarily southbound destinations. Queen Street and Buchanan Street mainly served northbound destinations.

To rationalise the city's mainline services, Bruce suggested that all four Victorian railway stations be demolished and replaced with two new purpose built stations. A new Glasgow North station was proposed roughly on the site of Buchanan Street station (occupying a larger area) to replace Buchanan Street and Queen Street stations. A Glasgow South station was proposed on the approximate site of Glasgow Central station to replace Central and St Enoch stations. Bruce's plan then called for a new bus station on the Queen Street site, with the "low level" railway station there remaining to provide suburban services and to connect the new bus station to the rail network.

These plans were never implemented, and all four stations remained until the 1960s when the Beeching Axe reforms changed the shape of rail services across Scotland, England, and Wales. Beeching's reforms spelt the end for both Buchanan Street and St Enoch stations which closed, effectively rationalising rail services in the city along similar lines to Bruce's two station plan, but without requiring the demolition of four stations and construction of two new ones. Beeching's reforms also removed low level services from Glasgow Central station, but these were reintroduced in the late 1970s in the form of the Argyle Line. Glasgow Central has recently undergone extensive, careful and sympathetic renovation and remains one of the city's architectural assets to this day.

Two new bus stations would ultimately result from the Bruce Report, positioned at either corner of the city's central area to make full use of the Ring Road, a new terminus at Anderston to the south (eventually opening in 1972 as part of the Anderston Centre), thus replacing the older terminus at Waterloo Street while Dundas Street bus station was replaced by Buchanan Street Bus Station in 1976. Anderston eventually closed in 1993, with all services consolidated at the Buchanan terminal.
