= Argyle Building, Glasgow =

Residential building

Coordinates: 55.85960°N 4.26767°W

Argyle Building
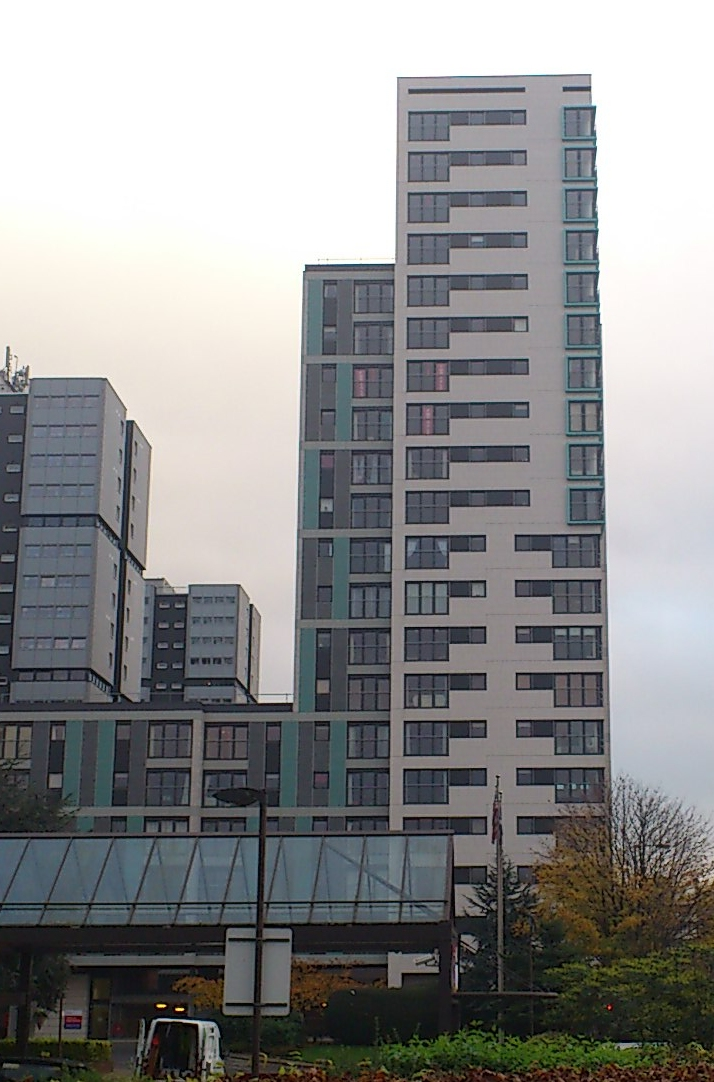
- The Argyle Building, with the Anderston Centre towers to the immediate left.
- Interactive map of the Argyle Building area

General information
- Status: Completed
- Type: Residential
- Architectural style: Modernist
- Location: 490 Argyle Street, Anderston, Glasgow, Scotland
- Construction started: 2005
- Completed: 2008

Height
- Height: 62 m (203 ft)

Technical details
- Floor count: 21
- Lifts/elevators: 2

Design and construction
- Architecture firm: Aedas Architects
- Main contractor: Taylor Wimpey Ltd

The Argyle Building is a mid-rise residential Skyscraper in the Anderston district within the centre of Glasgow, Scotland. Started in 2005 and completed in 2008, it is among the highest buildings currently standing within the city's central area and occupies a prominent spot next to the Kingston Bridge and the M8 motorway. It can be seen prominently in the background of BBC Scotland television news bulletins.

== Background ==
The Argyle Building was conceived as part of the regeneration of the Anderston Centre complex which was built around the turn of the 1970s, which had steadily fallen into partial dereliction. The tower was part of wider gentrification efforts to regenerate the Anderston area as part of the Glasgow International Financial Services District initiative, thereby encouraging young professionals to live as well as work in the area. The tower forms part of the Cuprum office development, which occupies the lower four levels and adjoins directly onto its eastern side. The building is largely Modernist in its design, and has features which are intended to mimic the style of the Anderston Centre's tower blocks which stand directly adjacent.

== See also ==
- List of tallest buildings and structures in Glasgow
