= Kingston Bridge, Glasgow =

Bridge in Glasgow, Scotland

Kingston Bridge
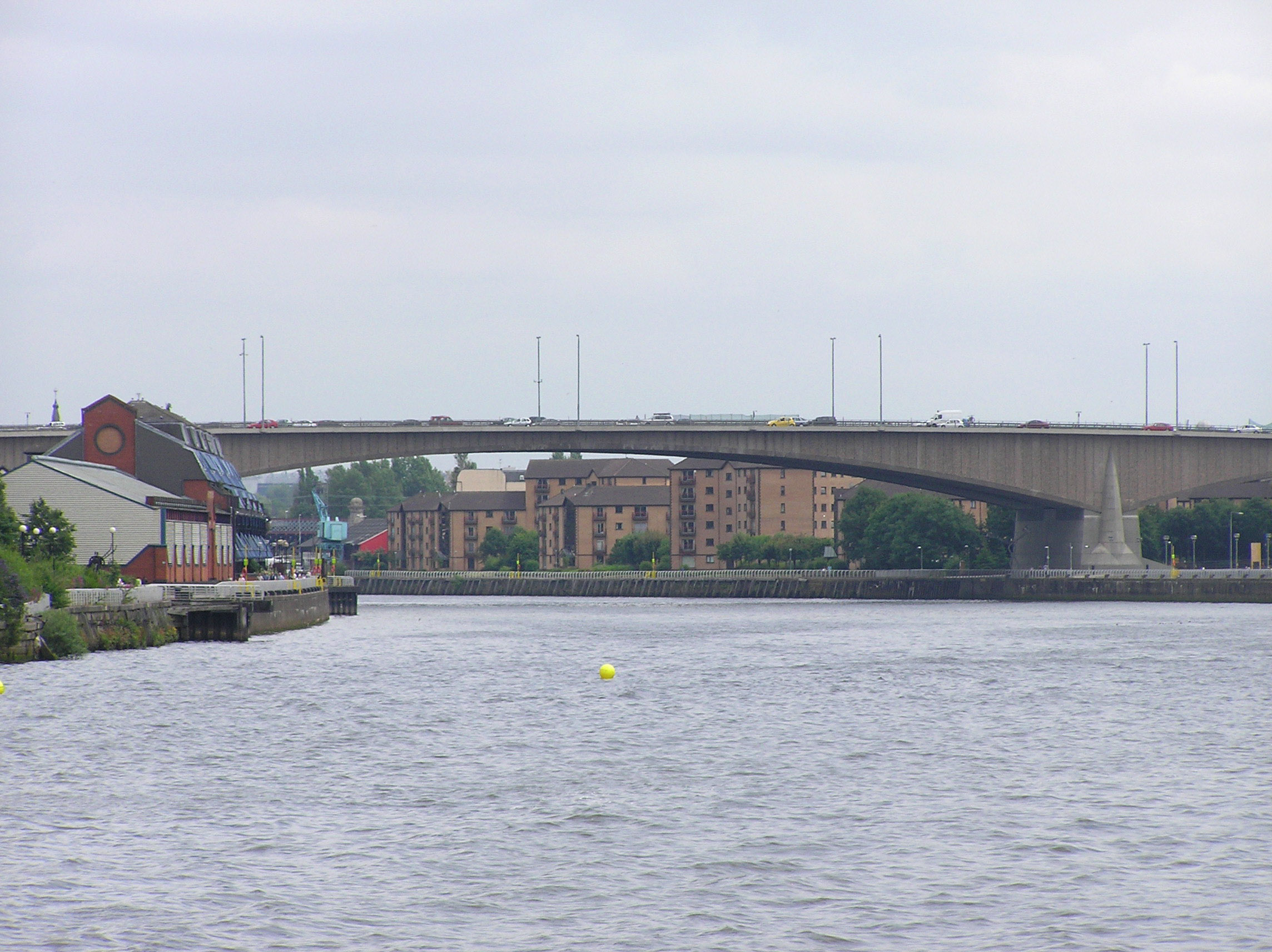
- Kingston Bridge, looking eastward up the River Clyde
- Coordinates: 55°51′19″N 4°16′12″W
- Carries: M8
- Crosses: River Clyde
- Locale: Glasgow

Characteristics
- Design: Balanced cantilever with triple-cell segmented prestressed concrete box girders Designer: William Fairhurst; Contractor: Logan-Marples Ridgway
- Width: Dual five-lane carriageway each carriageway: 21 metres (69 ft)
- Longest span: 143 metres (469 ft) (side spans 62.5 metres (205 ft))

History
- Opened: 26 June 1970 (56 years ago)

Listed Building – Category C(S)
- Official name: Kingston Bridge (bridge Only), Glasgow
- Designated: 11 November 2020
- Reference no.: LB52554

Location
- Interactive map of Kingston Bridge

The Kingston Bridge is a balanced cantilever dual-span ten lane road bridge made of triple-cell segmented prestressed concrete box girders crossing the River Clyde in Glasgow, Scotland.

Carrying the M8 motorway through the city centre, the Kingston Bridge is one of the busiest bridges in Europe, carrying around 150,000 vehicles every day.

== History ==
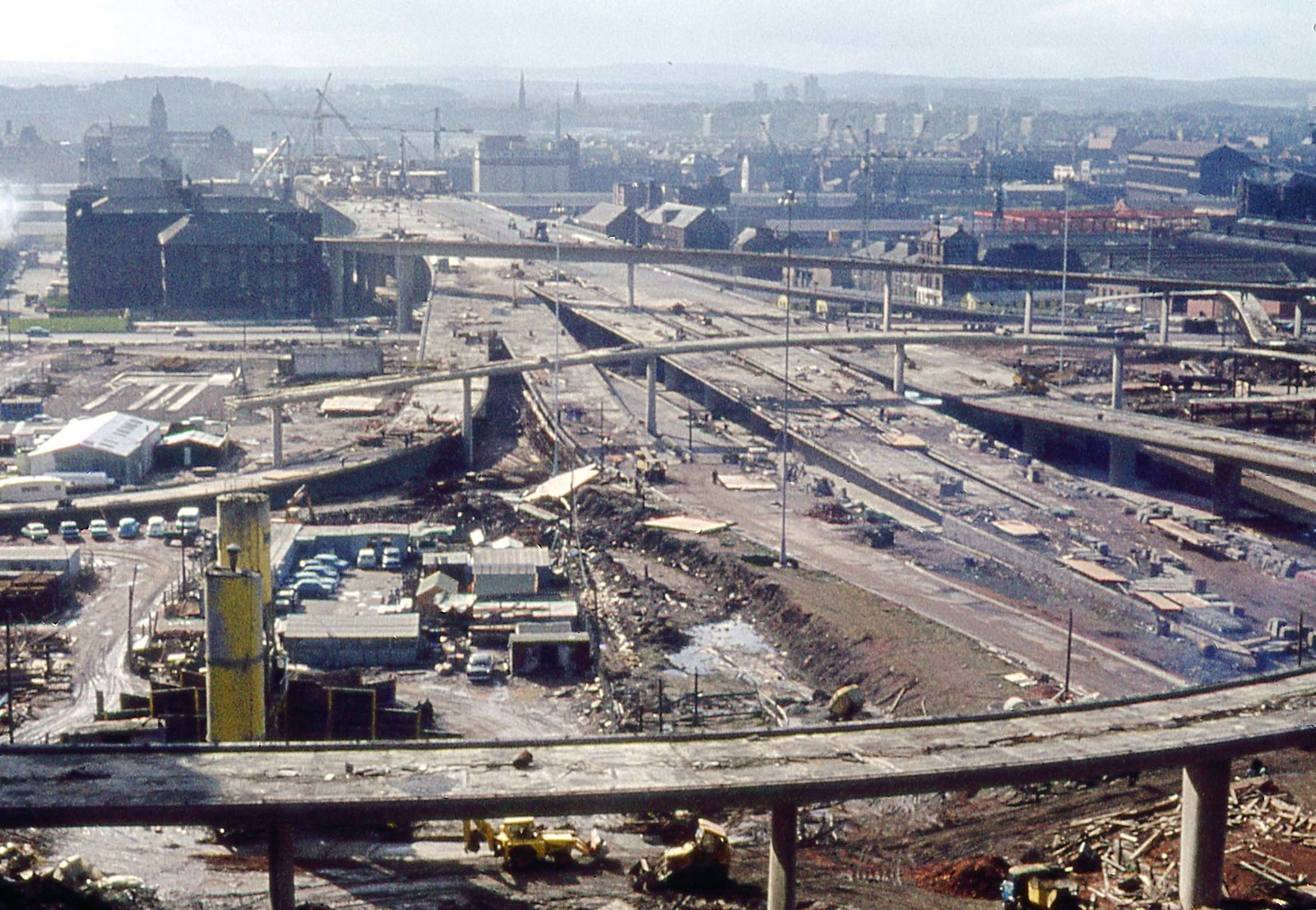
Northern approach to the Kingston Bridge under construction

The bridge was first proposed in 1945 as part of the Glasgow Inner Ring Road scheme. After feasibility studies were carried out, William Fairhurst was appointed consulting engineer for the design of the bridge and its approaches and on 15 May 1967 construction began; this was a joint venture between Duncan Logan (Construction) Ltd and Marples Ridgway. The eventual cost was £2.4m excluding the approach viaducts (or around £11m in total). On 26 June 1970 Kingston Bridge was opened by Queen Elizabeth the Queen Mother.

The erstwhile Kingston Dock, which was located on the south bank of the river, was closed to allow for construction of the bridge. It had been completed in 1867 between Windmillcroft Quay and the former headquarters of the Scottish Co-operative Wholesale Society on Morrison Street, adjacent to where the bridge now stands. It was Glasgow's first enclosed dock. The dock was eventually closed to navigation in 1966 when work began on the construction of the Kingston Bridge; the basin was subsequently filled in and housing built on the site. At the time of construction, however, the Clyde Port Authority still insisted that the bridge have a clearance height of 18 m (60 ft) in order to allow dredgers to go upstream as far as the King George V Bridge.

When opened in 1970, the bridge was designed to handle 120,000 vehicles a day. By 1990, the sheer excess volume and weight of traffic, combined with poor design and flaws in construction, resulted in serious structural deterioration. A decade-long repair and renovation programme was initiated to repair and strengthen the bridge. These repairs have involved strengthening the quay walls and jacking-up the 52,000-tonne deck of the bridge, while still operational, to allow the construction of new supporting piers, before lowering the bridge back onto the new, more robust supports. It was described by the contractor Balfour Beatty as one of the most ambitious civil engineering projects to take place in the city. Indeed, the operation involved 128 hydraulic jacks, making it the biggest ever bridge lift, qualifying for the Guinness Book of Records.

A longer-term attempt to solve the problem of chronic congestion is the M74 motorway northern extension, to act as the southern flank of the unbuilt Glasgow Inner Ring Road first planned in the 1960s. The existing "ski jump" where the Inner Ring was intended to continue on has remained unused; the extended M74 (opened on 28 June 2011) meets the M8 secondary carriageways a few hundred metres further south at Scotland Street giving both access to the northern end of the M77 motorway, but requires M74-to-M8 traffic and vice versa to leave one motorway and navigate through a few urban blocks to access the other. This change of plan from the Scottish Executive was because of the Kingston Bridge's inability to handle an increase in traffic: the thinking was that the increased traffic from the new road would not then go straight over the bridge and would enable traffic from the south east (heading west either via the M8 or M77 to Ayrshire, Glasgow International Airport, Glasgow Prestwick Airport, the docks at Greenock and Hunterston or retail / entertainment complexes at Braehead and Silverburn) to bypass the north-eastern Glasgow and city centre sections of the M8. At the Public Inquiry into the road scheme, critics countered that this would mean an increase in ground-level traffic in the Tradeston area as commuters attempted to gain access to the bridge's access ramps. Prior to the M74 completion, a solution to the congestion problems was the Clyde Arc or "Squinty Bridge", which opened in September 2006 – this route was expected to take at least some of the local short-distance traffic away from the Kingston.

There is a dubious urban myth that the fourth man in the Williamwood bank robbery, Archie McGeachy, is buried in the pillars of the bridge. It features in the music video for the Simple Minds single "Speed Your Love to Me".

The bridge's 50th anniversary took place in 2020; at the end of that year it was listed at Category C by Historic Environment Scotland as a "significant – albeit controversial – infrastructure project which transformed the city of Glasgow... also has special architectural interest".

== Location ==
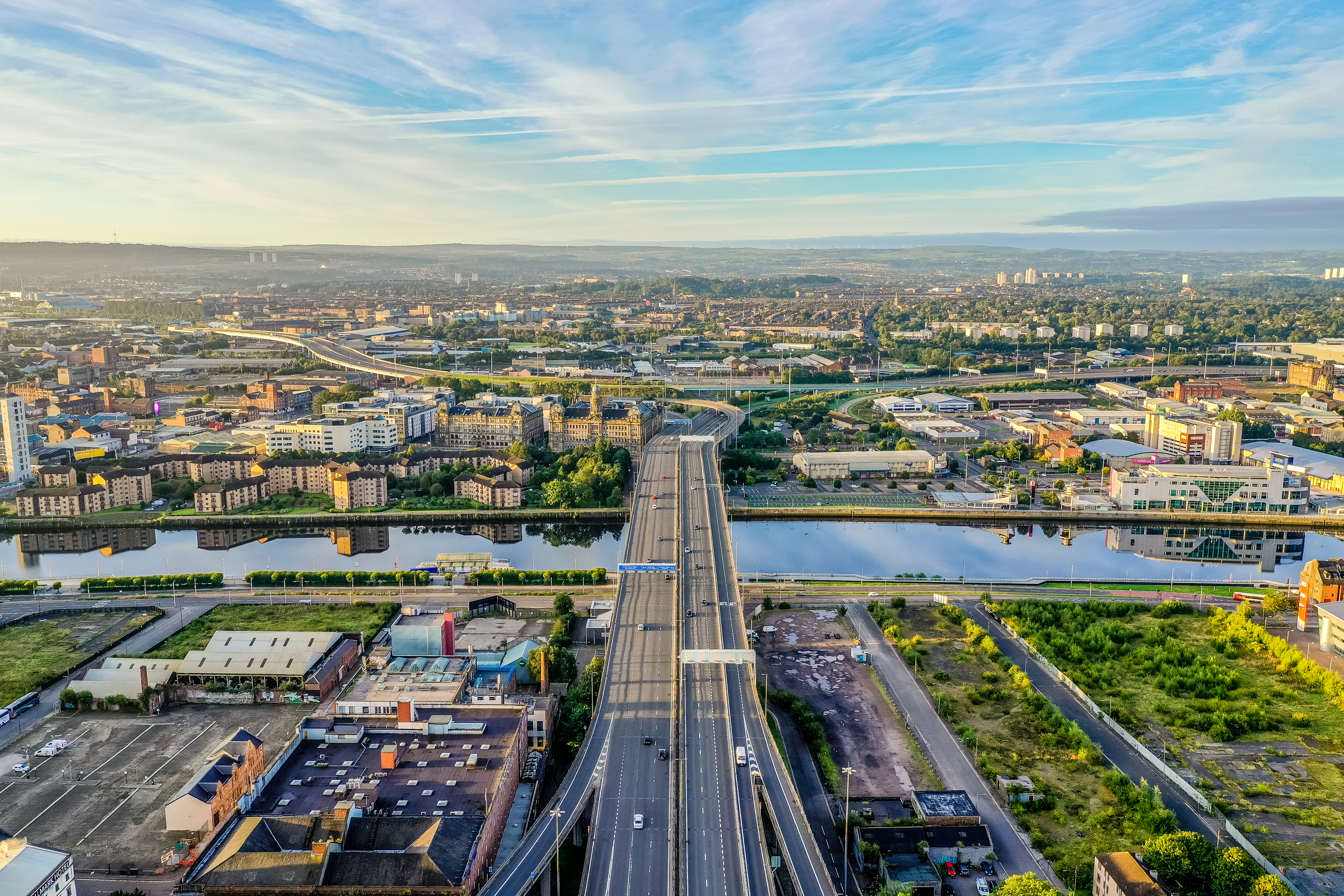
Aerial view of the Kingston Bridge

The name of the bridge refers to the Kingston area on the south of the river.

The bridge connects Anderston and the city centre at Junction 18/19, and Kingston, Tradeston and the Gorbals at Junction 20. It consists of two parallel spans (so technically could be considered to be two separate bridges), each 21 metres (69 ft) wide, with each supporting a deck with five lanes. The eastern span carries southbound traffic over the river and the western span carries northbound traffic. The approaches to the bridge are also linked with several junctions of their own, including ramps for the city centre, the M77 motorway and the Clydeside Expressway (A814), some of which are two lanes wide. The outer spandrels of the bridge are clad with exposed-aggregate panels showing vertical joints.

== Gallery ==
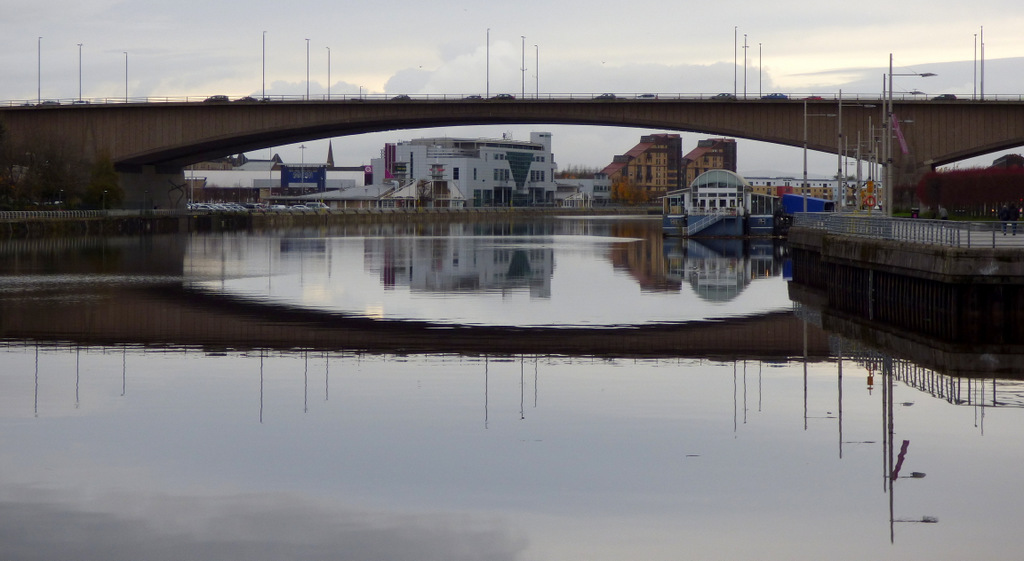

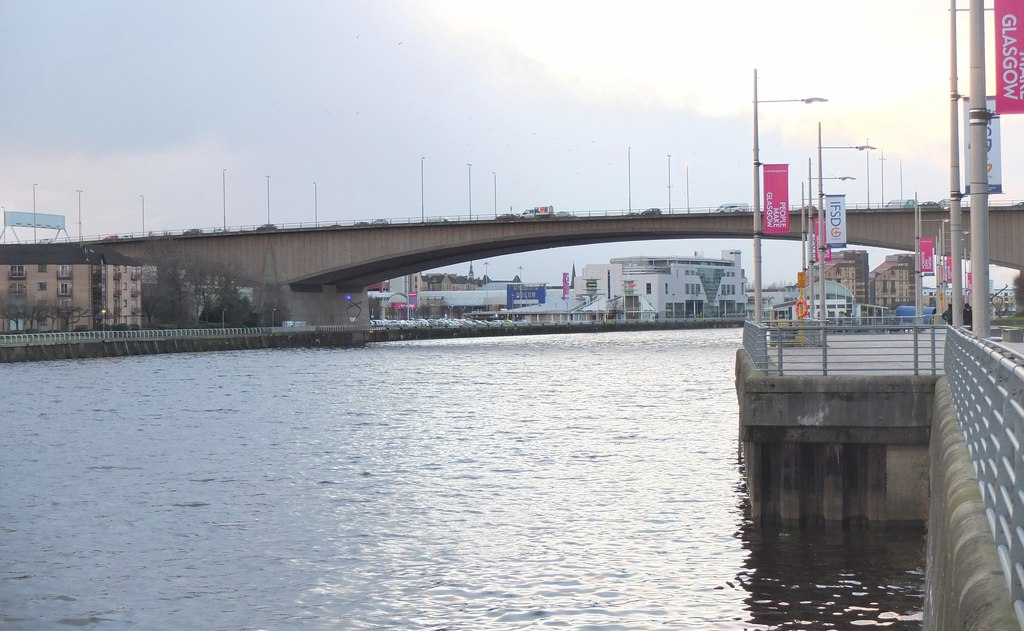

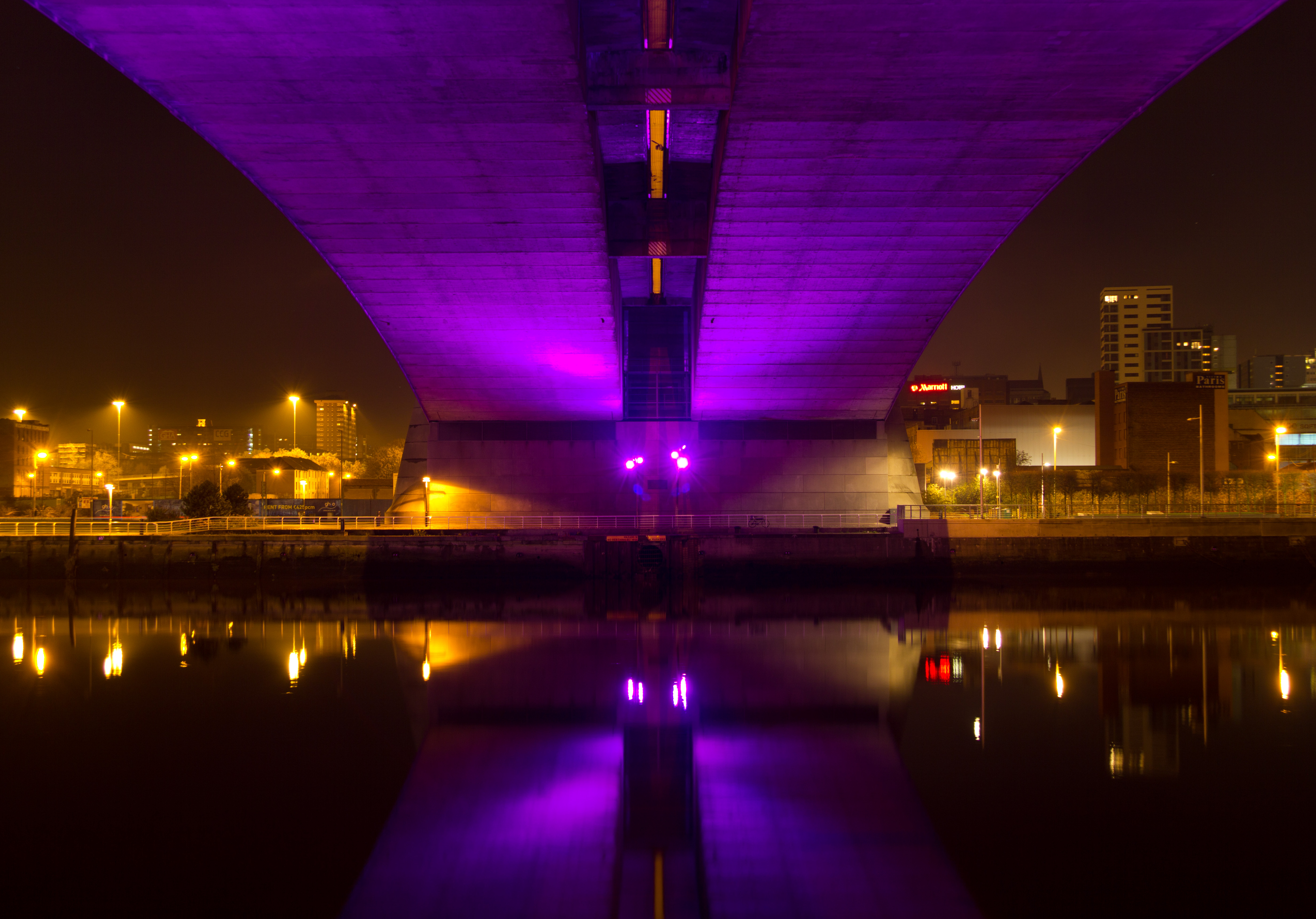

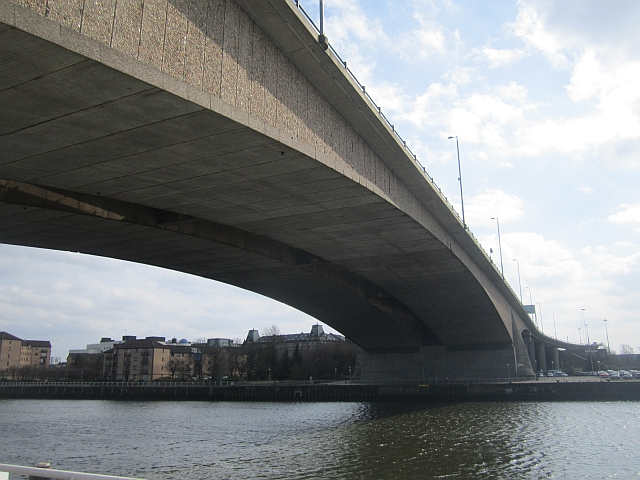

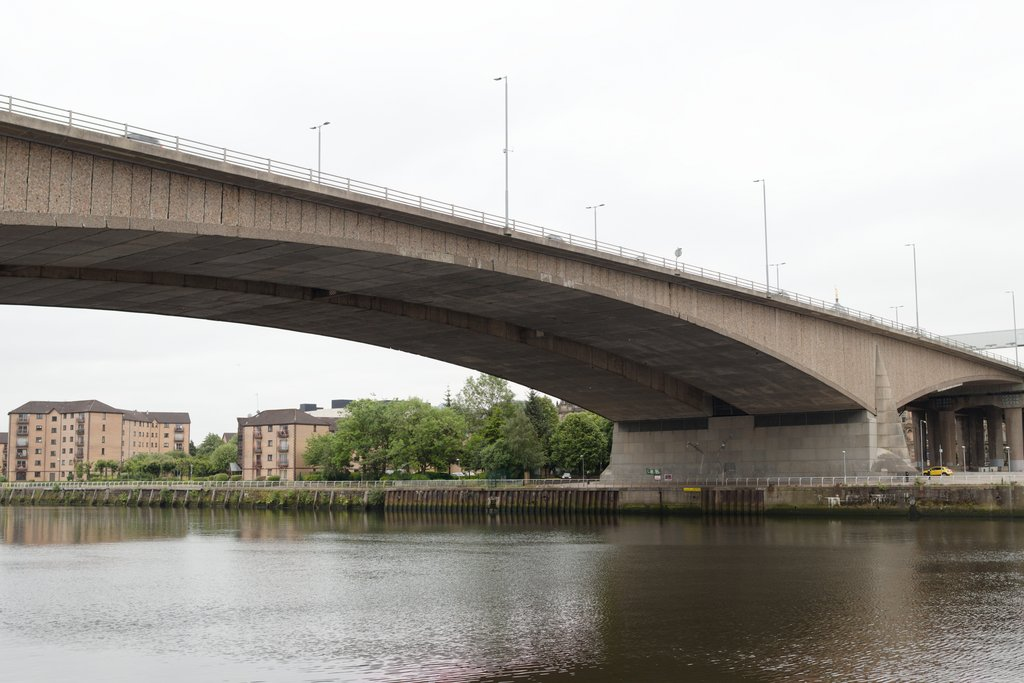

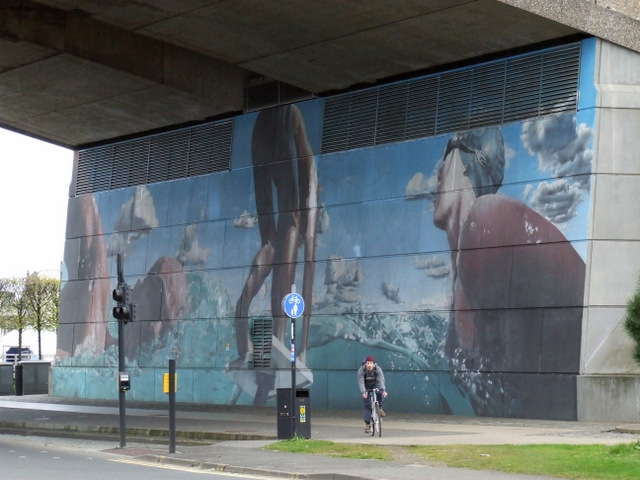

== See also ==
- List of bridges in Scotland

Next crossing upstream	River Clyde	Next crossing downstream
Tradeston Bridge	Kingston Bridge; Grid reference NS5799364851	Clyde Arc
