= A814 road =

Road in Scotland

Coordinates: 55.8697°N 4.3186°W

A814

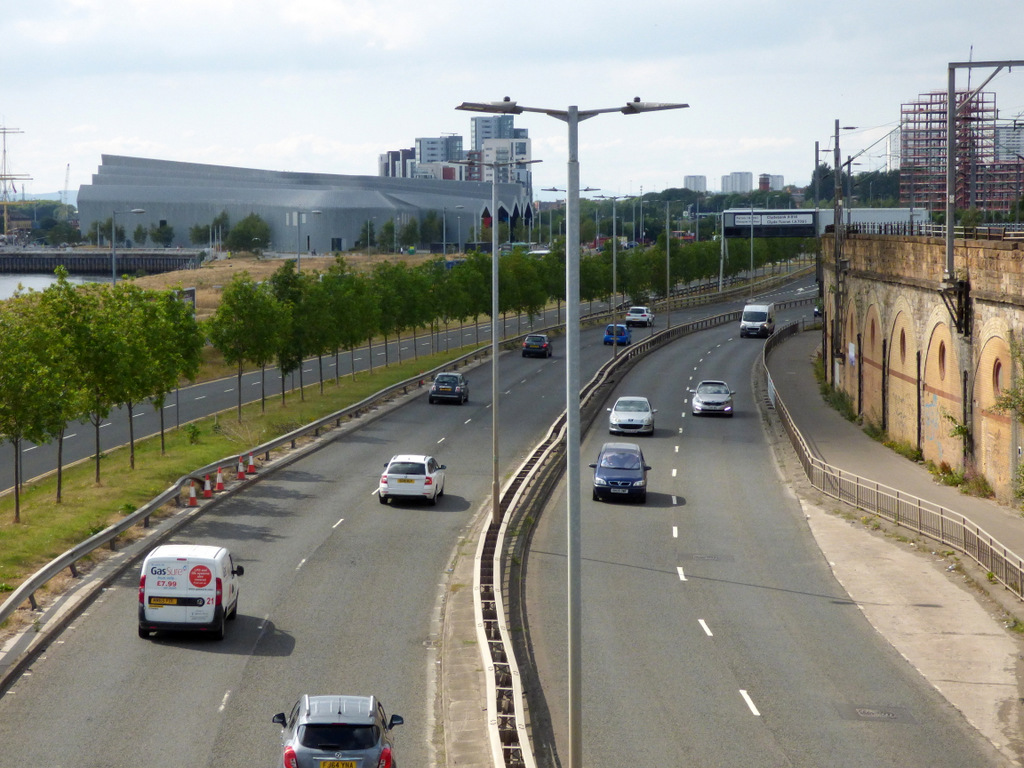
- The A814 Clydeside Expressway looking westwards to the Riverside Museum (2018)

Route information
- Length: 40 mi (64 km)

Major junctions
- East end: Glasgow Green
- Northwest end: Arrochar

Location
- Country: United Kingdom
- Constituent country: Scotland

Road network
- Roads in the United Kingdom; Motorways; A and B road zones
← A813	→ A815

The A814 road in Scotland (known for part of its length as the Clydeside Expressway) is a major arterial route within Glasgow, connecting the city centre to the west end. Running along the right (north) bank of the River Clyde, it continues further west through Clydebank and Dumbarton, leaving the suburban environment and serving as the main road for Helensburgh, turning north to meet the A83 at Arrochar, Argyll and Bute.

== Route ==
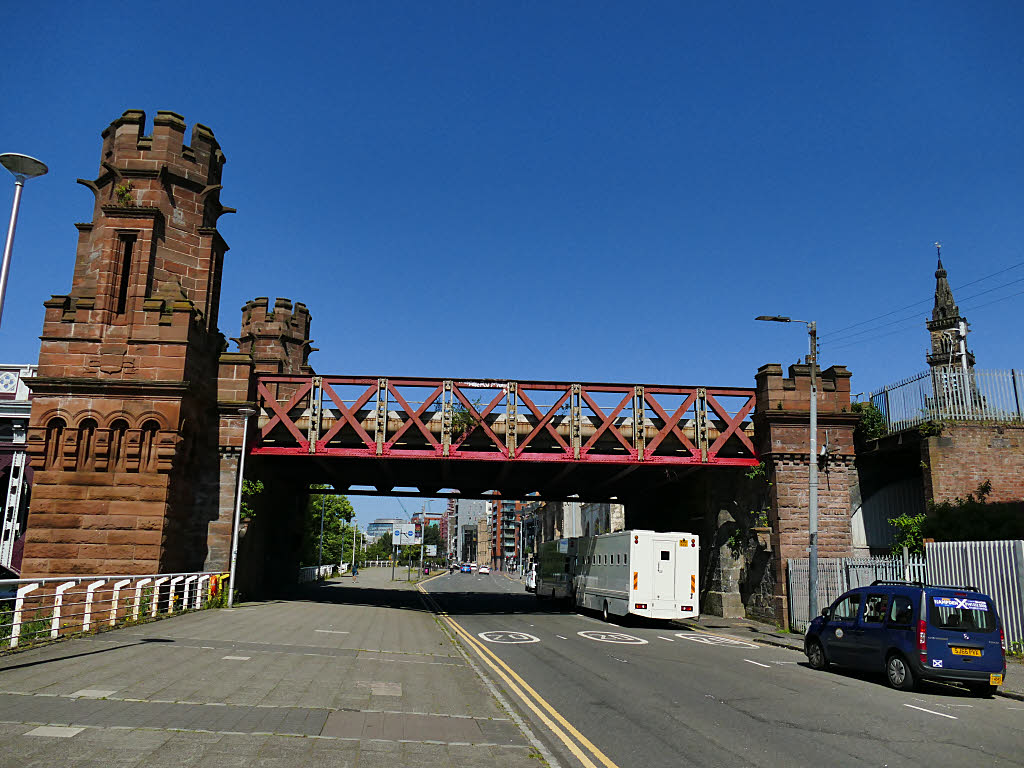
Eastern end of the A814 at Clyde Street, Glasgow (looking west)

The A814 starts at the junction of Clyde Street and Saltmarket (A8, beside Glasgow Green and the Albert Bridge) in the east of Glasgow city centre and follows the River Clyde's right (north) bank westwards, becoming the Broomielaw after passing under the Caledonian Railway Bridge (serving Glasgow Central Station). At James Watt Street, two streets take the designation, with the northern one (Argyle Street, one of the city's main pedestrianised shopping zones further east) becoming a dual carriageway just before it passes under the M8 motorway at Junction 19 beside Anderston railway station and becomes the elevated Clydeside Expressway – there is direct motorway slip access to and from the Expressway onto the Kingston Bridge crossing the river, but traffic intending to travel northwards / eastwards on the M8 must use the road network and join at Junction 18, similarly those joining the Expressway or Argyle Street from that direction must exit at J19 onto a standard traffic junction. The south 'branch' of the A814 continues under the Kingston Bridge along the riverside at Lancefield Quay before turning north at Finnieston Street by the Clyde Arc Bridge and feeding 'onto itself' a short distance further north).

After passing the SEC Centre / SSE Hydro on one side and residential Kelvinhaugh and Yorkhill on the other (two footbridges provide pedestrian access at what is a very busy and fast-moving section), an atypical junction added in the early 21st century just prior to the River Kelvin provides access from the Expressway to eastern Partick and the Riverside Museum from the westbound direction, with eastbound entry/exit points further on at Glasgow Harbour where the main carriageway is in a cutting. There is a further junction at the Thornwood roundabout providing suburban access western Partick and Broomhill.

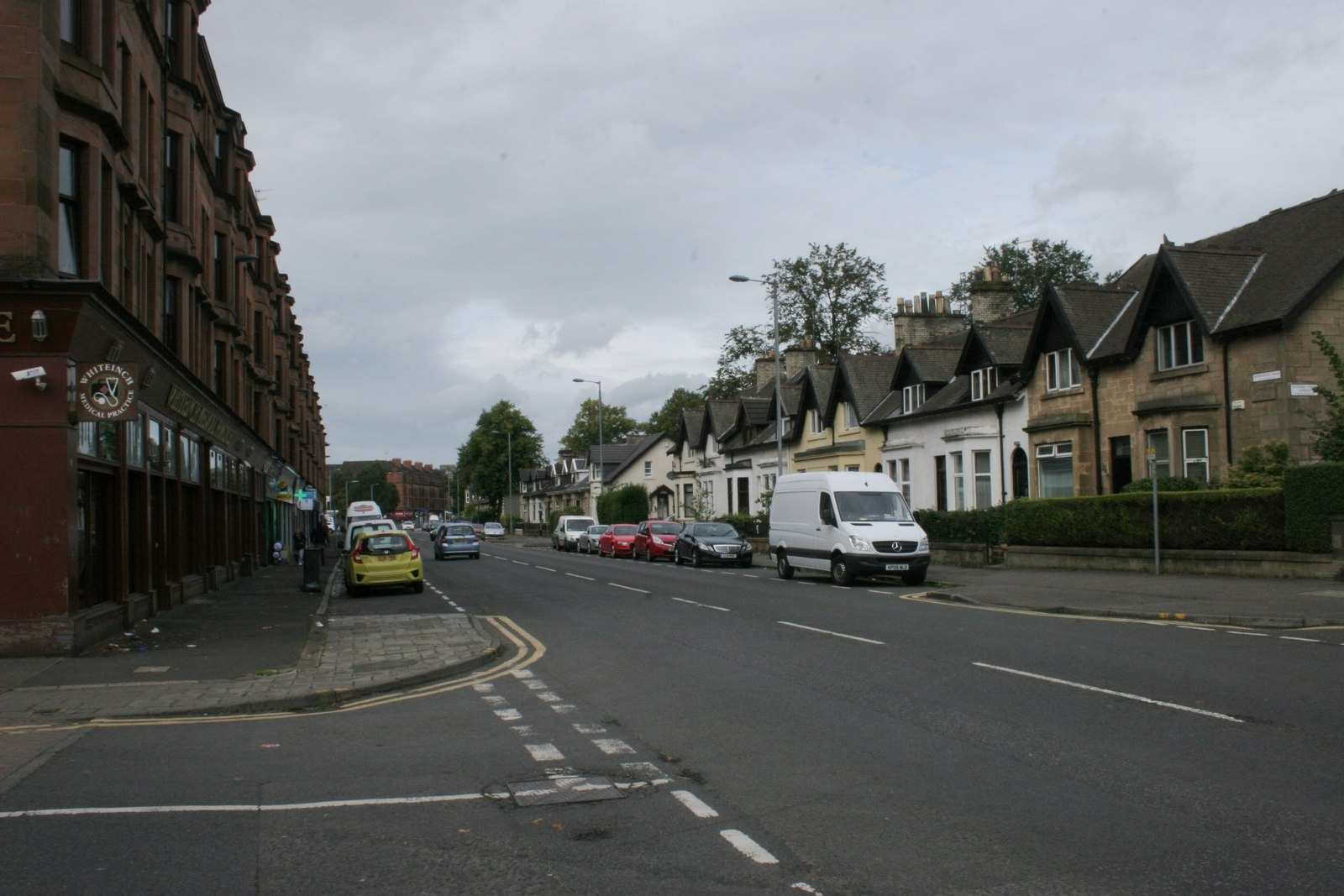
Dumbarton Road, Scotstoun, Glasgow (looking west)

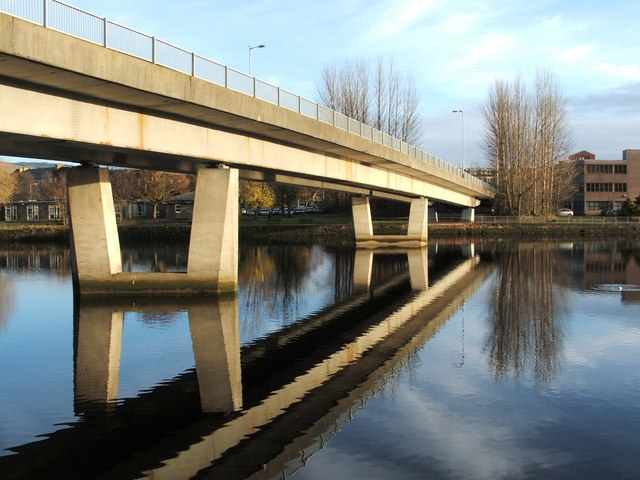
A814 crossing the River Leven on the Artizan Bridge, Dumbarton

The A814 carries on to the A739 interchange (see below) beyond which it drops down to street level at Whiteinch, continuing as Dumbarton Road through Scotstoun, Yoker and into Clydebank (where it is named Glasgow Road) and Dalmuir (becoming Dumbarton Road again). Now out of the city, it feeds the A82 / A898 (Erskine Bridge interchange) at Old Kilpatrick then merges with the A82 for a short distance as a dual carriageway before recovering its designation through the town centre of Dumbarton (as Glasgow Road and Cardross Road), over the River Leven and past Cardross, directly next to the Firth of Clyde through Helensburgh and alongside the Gare Loch past Faslane naval base. It turns north onto the left bank of Loch Long, meeting the A83 at the head of the loch at Arrochar. It shares some characteristics with the A82 which is also a main urban route within western Glasgow (as Great Western Road) and then an important rural road in Argyll, almost connecting with the end of the A814 as it clings to the shore of Loch Lomond as well as superseding it as the route number for a short distance between Bowling and Milton where the tight confines of the Clyde and the Kilpatrick Hills leave space for only one road.

== Clydeside Expressway history ==
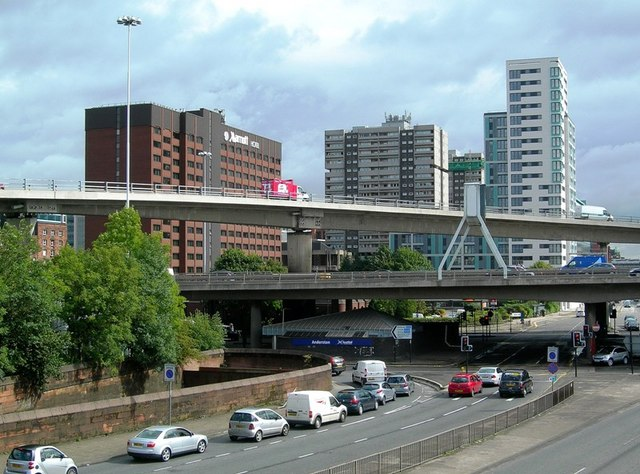
Eastern end of the Clydeside Expressway joining the urban street network at Anderston, with flyover onto the Kingston Bridge (M8) for southbound traffic

Construction on the expressway started in 1971, taking around 24 months, with the road opening to traffic in April 1973. The Expressway includes many over- and underpasses which are designed in typical Glasgow style, using prestressed concrete beams fabricated on site. Unlike most motorways in Scotland, corner radii were set at 150 feet, and the road has a unique electric road heating system installed which is used to reduce the need to grit during the winter months. The Expressway has a number of unique grade separated junctions designed to enable efficient movement of traffic whilst minimising land take. Whiteinch Interchange is an example of such a junction, designed to allow traffic to move freely between the Expressway and the Clyde Tunnel (A739). The design of this junction created a challenge as it was a requirement that it should be completely free flowing whilst also not taking any land from the nearby Victoria Park. The final design involves a partial-cloverleaf where traffic from opposing directions temporarily share carriageway space when moving around the interchange.

In 2022, plans released under Glasgow City Council's 'liveable neighbourhoods programme' included a proposal to reduce the Expressway to a single-lane, tree-lined boulevard to provide better harmony with the neighbourhoods in its vicinity, and to reduce pollution and discourage car use in the city centre.
