= Anderston =

Area of Glasgow, Scotland

Coordinates: 55.8662°N 4.2691°W

Anderston: Scottish Gaelic: Baile Aindrea; Scots: Anderstoun
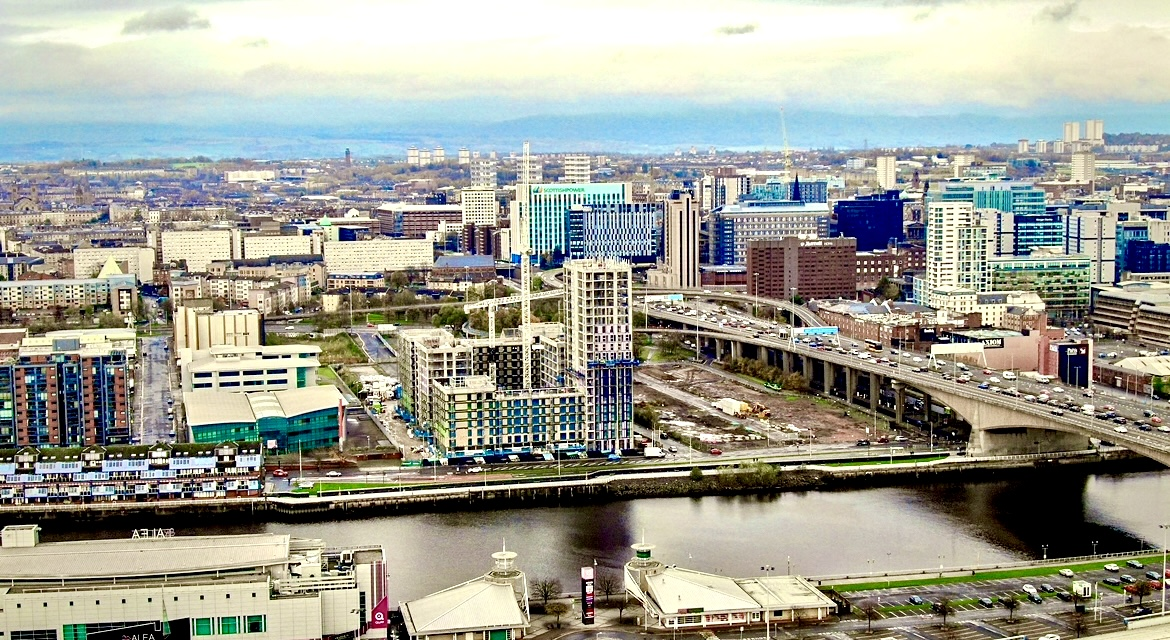
- An aerial shot of Anderston in 2023, showing the M8 motorway and the River Clyde, with new high rise apartment towers being built along the former Anderston Quay

- Location within Glasgow
- OS grid reference: NS581660
- Council area: Glasgow City Council
- Lieutenancy area: Glasgow
- Country: Scotland
- Sovereign state: United Kingdom
- Post town: GLASGOW
- Postcode district: G2, G3
- Dialling code: 0141
- Police: Scotland
- Fire: Scottish
- Ambulance: Scottish
- UK Parliament: Glasgow North
- Scottish Parliament: Glasgow Kelvin

Anderston (Scots: Anderstoun, Scottish Gaelic: Baile Aindrea - a portmanteau of "Anderson's Town") is an area within inner Glasgow, Scotland. It is on the north bank of the River Clyde and forms the south western edge of the city centre. Established as a village of handloom weavers in the early 18th century, Anderston was an independent burgh of barony from 1824 until it was incorporated into the City of Glasgow in 1846.

The district is served by Anderston railway station. It is bordered by Charing Cross to the north, Blythswood Hill to the east and Finnieston to the west.

== Foundation ==
The land on which the present day district of Anderston stands was once known as the Bishop's Forest. These lands, situated to the west of medieval Glasgow, were granted to the Bishop of Glasgow by King James II of Scotland in 1450. The lands of Stobcross, which occupied part of this area, were the property of the Anderson family from the mid-16th century, and here they built their mansion, Stobcross House. Tradition has it that the name came from a wooden cross or ‘stob’ which marked the spot. Stobcross House was demolished in 1875 to make way for Queen's Dock.

Anderston was originally an unproductive section of the Stobcross Estate which was feued out for weavers' cottages in 1725 by James Anderson of Stobcross House. It was named Anderson Town in his honour, later becoming Anderston. The fledgling village of Anderston began close to Gushet Farm, which became Anderston Cross and today is the site of the Kingston Bridge which carries the M8 motorway over the River Clyde. Ownership of the village changed in 1735 when it was taken over by John Orr. In those days Anderston had bleachfields down by the river and Main Street consisted of weavers' cottages along both sides. As business and trade increased so did the size of Anderston. Finnieston, a nearby village was established in 1768 by Matthew Orr, named for the Rev. John Finnie, the Orr family tutor and Finnieston weavers were allowed to become members of Anderston's weavers society from 1774. From its origins as a weavers' village, the area became an industrial centre with the growth of Glasgow's cotton industry and other industries including glassmaking and pottery.

By 1794, the population of the village of Anderston was around 3,900. In the countryside surrounding the village there were many country estates such as Hydepark and Lancefield. These would later be commemorated in the street names of Anderston as the area expanded and became urbanised in the 19th century. The eastern boundary of Anderston was for many years marked by Royalty Stones number 208 and 209, on the north and south sides of the present Argyle Street. The Blythswood Burn had originally flowed through the site, and had marked the eastern boundary of the Stobcross lands. The Royalty Stones stood on the site from around 1782 until they were removed during the comprehensive development which took place in the area in the 1960s and 1970s.

By the late 18th century, Anderston was a thriving community, with its population employed mostly in weaving and related industries such as bleaching, dyeing and printing. Other industries were also thriving by this period, such as the Delftfield Pottery (established 1748), the Anderston Brewery (1760s) and the Verreville Glassworks (1776). The area's first church, the Anderston Relief Church in Heddle Place, was erected in 1770.

The area of Anderston now known as Cranstonhill was known in ancient times as Drumother Hill. It became corrupted to Drumover Hill, the reason for this being a myth that it was the place where vagabonds were escorted to, to the tune of the "Rogues' March", when they were drummed out of town. Alexander Peden prophesied in the 17th century that this hill would one day be the site of the 'Cross of Glasgow.' At that time, the hill stood in open countryside a few miles from the Burgh of Glasgow.

== 19th century ==
In the early 19th century, Henry Houldsworth, a cotton mill owner, established a spinning mill on Cheapside Street which was steam powered. In 1809, the Cranstonhill reservoir was built which supplied the village with a direct source of water from the River Clyde. The town was made a Burgh of Barony in 1824 when Anderston's population stood at around 10,000, The first Town Council was elected, with Henry Houldsworth being chosen as the first Provost of Anderston. The council also included three Bailies, eleven councillors and a Treasurer. The Burgh motto was the Latin Alter Alterius Auxilio Veget, which roughly translates as 'the one flourishes by the help of the other.' However, Anderston's status as an independent Burgh would not last long. In 1846 it was incorporated into the City of Glasgow. The last Provost of Anderston was Henry Houldsworth's son, John.

During the rest of the 19th century, the area continued to grow and new industries developed, such as shipbuilding, iron-founding, tool manufacturing and engineering. The close proximity to the docks on the River Clyde meant that Anderston also became an ideal place for the establishment of whisky bonds, grain stores and timber yards. This period also saw the establishment of the famous Cranstonhill (established 1865) and Bilsland Bakeries (1882). Thomas Lipton opened his first shop in Stobcross Street in 1871.

The increase of industry in the area brought a large number of people from the Scottish Lowlands. There was also a large Irish immigrant population moving to the area and by 1831 about a quarter of Anderston's population were Irish. The rapid development of industry in the area also led to a demand for working class housing, and most of the Anderston area was built in the late 19th century, comprising the solid stone tenement buildings which are synonymous with Glasgow. This was also the period when many of Anderston's churches were built to serve the growing community. These included St Mark's Lancefield (1850), St Patrick's RC Church (1850) Anderston Parish Church (1865).

By the close of the 19th century shipping and associated industries had taken over the area and spread to fill the parkland beside the Clyde and the area was densely populated and characterised by back-street workshops and closely packed tenements.

== 20th century ==
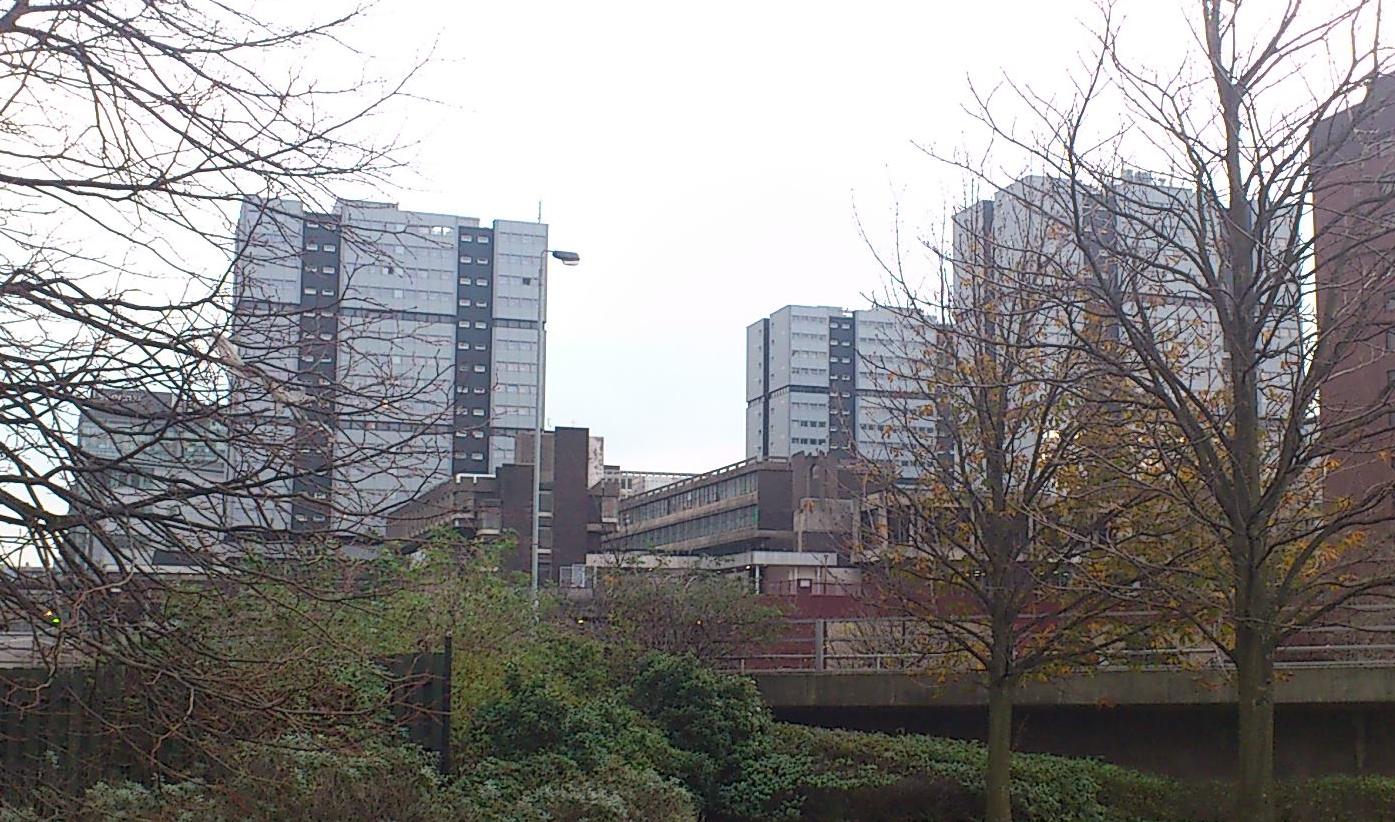
Anderston Centre (now known as Cadogan Square), built at the turn of the 1970s, was the flagship development of the regenerated Anderston, but would ultimately prove controversial. 2011 image.

Throughout the first half of the 20th century, even though it had been a part of Glasgow since 1846, Anderston remained in many respects like a large village within a city. There was a strong sense of local identity (which still survives to this day), with the area being well-served and self-contained in regard to shops, cinemas and places of employment. Like many other similar areas of Glasgow, relatives and friends tended to live locally (often in the same building), and everyone knew everyone else in the area, to a large extent. But this situation would change in the post-war era.

Several buildings in Anderston on Finnieston Street, Hill Street, Hydepark Street and Lancefield Street were destroyed during air raids in May 1941.

After the Second World War, there was a determination by national and local government that something had to be done about the bad housing and overcrowding of the inner city areas which existed in most of the major cities in Britain. The Bruce Report of 1945 led to the concept of 'Comprehensive Development' which meant the total demolition of areas of sub standard housing and slums in the city, so that new, planned communities could be built on the cleared ground. In total, 20 Comprehensive Development Areas were designated in Glasgow, with one of them comprising a large part of Anderston.

Although Anderston's housing problems were no worse than many other areas of Glasgow, Anderston was made an area for priority treatment as the need to improve Glasgow's road network had led to the plans for building a motorway through the city. The route of this motorway was to go through Anderston Cross, the traditional heart of the community, and the plan for the comprehensive development of the area was approved in 1961. The new Anderston would therefore be divided into three zones; a Commercial Zone devoted to office space and commerce on the eastern fringe of the city centre, and bordered on the west by the new ring road, a Residential Zone consisting of new housing estates to the immediate east and an Industrial Zone to the south east.

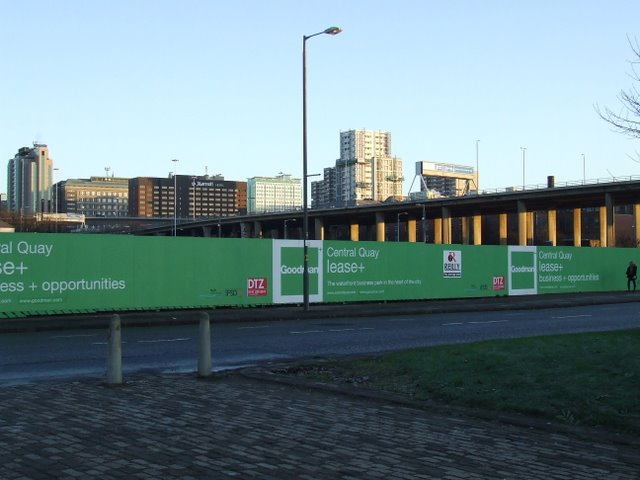
Anderston Commercial Zone taken from the south bank of the River Clyde in 2009, showing the Hilton and Marriott hotels, Dial House, the Argyle Building (under construction) and the Anderston Centre's housing towers

The work on the road network and the demolition of housing progressed throughout the 1960s. By the following decade, the new Anderston bore little resemblance to the old area. The high density housing and streets full of tenements had been swept away, and most of the residents had been rehoused in places such as Knightswood, Easterhouse, Cumbernauld, Drumchapel and East Kilbride. In 1951, the population had stood at 31,902; by 1971, it had dropped to 9,265 as a result of redevelopment.

There were two major fires in Anderston in the 1960s. The first occurred in March 1960 on Cheapside Street when a whisky bond caught fire and exploded. The explosion occurred over an hour after the initial fire and caused part of the building to collapse on top of three fire engines and trapped firemen beneath rubble. Fourteen firemen and five salvage corps workers were killed. The second fire occurred in November 1968 in a factory on James Watt Street. The fire trapped twenty-two workers who could not get through the windows which were barred.

Many of the tenement blocks in the area were demolished in the 1970s to make way for the M8 motorway and Kingston Bridge and Anderston Cross was replaced by the Anderston Centre. The idea was not a success, and by the 1980s the centre's many covered underpasses and service roads had become a notorious red light district, with prostitution a major activity in both Anderston and neighbouring Blythswood Hill in the evening.

== 21st century ==
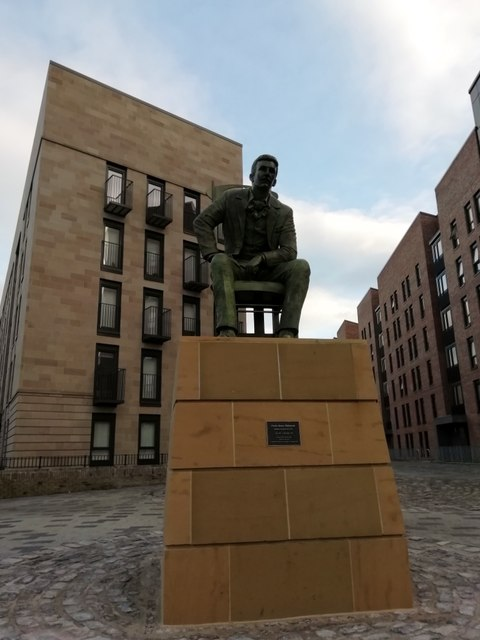
Statue of Charles Rennie Mackintosh in front of modern apartment development (2019)

However, with the exponential growth of Glasgow's flourishing new financial district, by the turn of the 21st century, Anderston's fortunes seemed to be improving. New ultra-modern office developments, international hotels and new residential buildings have sprung up, which have improved the look and reputation of the area markedly. After original plans to demolish them, the three tower blocks of the Anderston Centre were saved in favour of refurbishment, after they transferred to the Glasgow West Housing Association.

As of 2010 the blocks were being externally reclad to match the design of private developments going up adjacent. In 2011, work began on demolishing much of the original 1960s housing estate to the east of the motorway, including the Shaftesbury tower, and restoring portions of the original street plan including Argyle Street. The development, by Sanctuary Scotland, received multiple awards and also features a statue of Charles Rennie Mackintosh (designed by Andy Scott) as its centrepiece.

== Education ==
Anderston Primary School (1973), a non-denominational state school, is located on Port Street in Anderston.

St Patrick's Roman Catholic Primary School (1962) is situated on Perth Street in Anderston.

Glasgow Gaelic School (1999) is a Gaelic language nursery, primary and secondary school located in Berkeley Street.

== Sports teams ==
The area is home to football team Anderston Athletic who play in the Glasgow Colleges FA - Division 2.

== List of the Provosts of Anderston ==
- Henry Houldsworth 1824–32
- Angus McAlpine 1832–33
- Patrick McNaught 1833–35
- James Turnbull 1835–37
- Henry Houldsworth 1837–39
- James Jarvie 1839–42
- John Miller 1842–43
- John Houldsworth 1843–46

== Notable people ==
- Sir Billy Connolly (born 1942) – comedian, musician and actor
- Daniel Cottier (1838–1891) – artist and designer
- Arthur Henderson (1863–1935) – former Leader of the Labour Party, Home Secretary, Foreign Secretary and Nobel Peace Prize Laureate
- Peter Keenan (1928–2000) – British, European and British Empire boxing champion
- Johann Lamont (born 1957) – former leader of the Scottish Labour Party and Member of the Scottish Parliament
- Sir Thomas Lipton (1848–1931) – businessman, entrepreneur and yachtsman
- Roddy McMillan (1923–1979) – actor and playwright
- Michael Martin, Baron Martin of Springburn (1945–2018) – former Labour Member of Parliament (MP) and Speaker of the House of Commons
- Alex Mosson (born 1940) – former Labour councillor and Lord Provost of Glasgow
- Tony Roper (born 1941) – actor, comedian, playwright and writer
- Eddi Reader (born 1959) – singer/songwriter

== See also ==
- Glasgow tower blocks

== Notes ==
- Smart, Aileen (2002). Villages of Glasgow : north of the Clyde (Rev. ed.). Edinburgh: John Donald. ISBN 0859765628.
