= Sandyford, Glasgow =

Area of Glasgow, Scotland

Coordinates: 55.8644°N 4.2759132°W

Sandyford
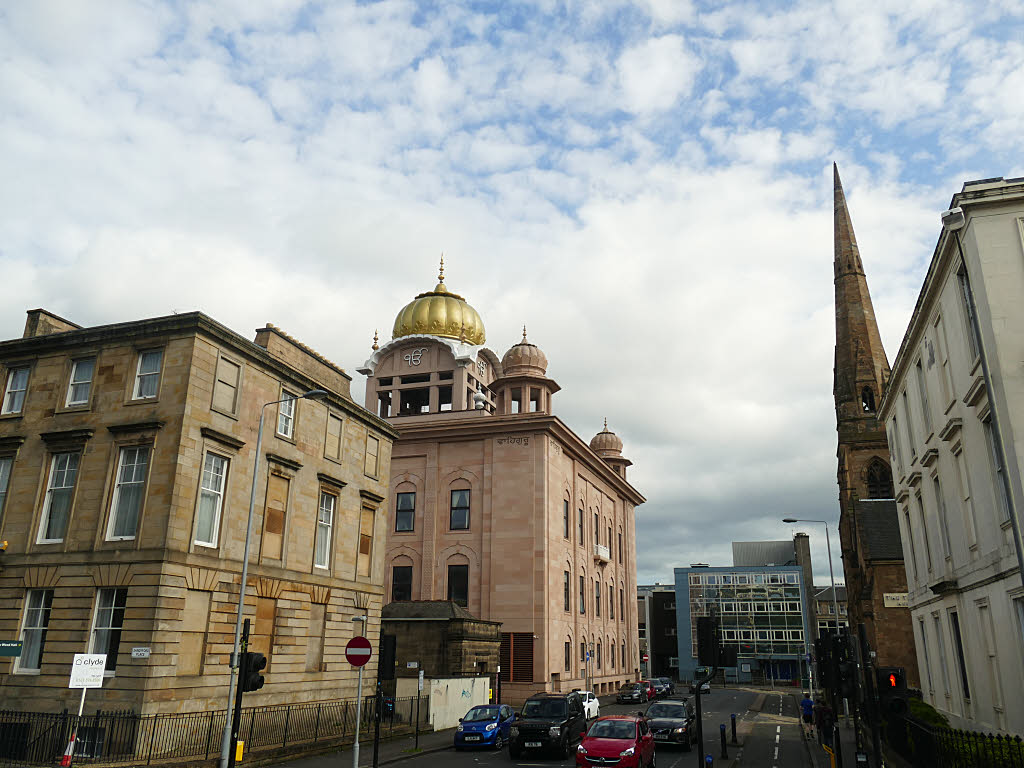
- View from Sauchiehall Street looking south to Sikh gurudwara, Tron church and Glasgow Gaelic School, 2019

- Location within Glasgow
- OS grid reference: NS576658
- Council area: Glasgow City Council
- Lieutenancy area: Glasgow
- Country: Scotland
- Sovereign state: United Kingdom
- Post town: GLASGOW
- Postcode district: G3 7 / G3 8
- Dialling code: 0141
- Police: Scotland
- Fire: Scottish
- Ambulance: Scottish
- UK Parliament: Glasgow Central
- Scottish Parliament: Glasgow Kelvin

Sandyford is an area of Glasgow, Scotland. It is north of the River Clyde and forms part of the western periphery of the city centre. Formerly the name of a ward under Glasgow Town Council in the first part of the 20th century, (Note: The ward had a roughly triangular territory extending from the point where Argyle Street and Sauchiehall Street connected near to the Kelvingrove Art Gallery and Museum and which included parts of Anderston south of St. Vincent Street and parts of the city centre (as far east as Pitt Street) which have been physically detached by redevelopment including the building of the M8 motorway, with those major roads forming natural borders for the smaller Sandyford area ending at North Street.) it is within a continuous area of fairly dense urban development bordering several other neighbourhoods whose mutual boundaries have blurred over time, and is possibly less well known than all of the places which adjoin it, particularly Anderston and Finnieston.

== History ==
The area was a country estate outside Glasgow and north of the former burgh of Anderston centred around Sandyford House until the mid-19th century, when the expansion and industrialisation of the rapidly growing city spread westwards, with Sauchiehall Street, on which Sandyford House stood, becoming one of the primary thoroughfares (at that time the western end of Sauchiehall Street was known as Sandyford Street, its name changing in the early 1900s). A street plan was laid out and filled mostly with Neo-Georgian terraced townhouses in a continuation of development which had taken place further east at Blythswood Hill, the mansion itself being demolished by 1850. The Park district to the north was laid out in a similar period and in a similar style. To the east, as traffic to and from the city increased, a major road junction developed at Charing Cross.

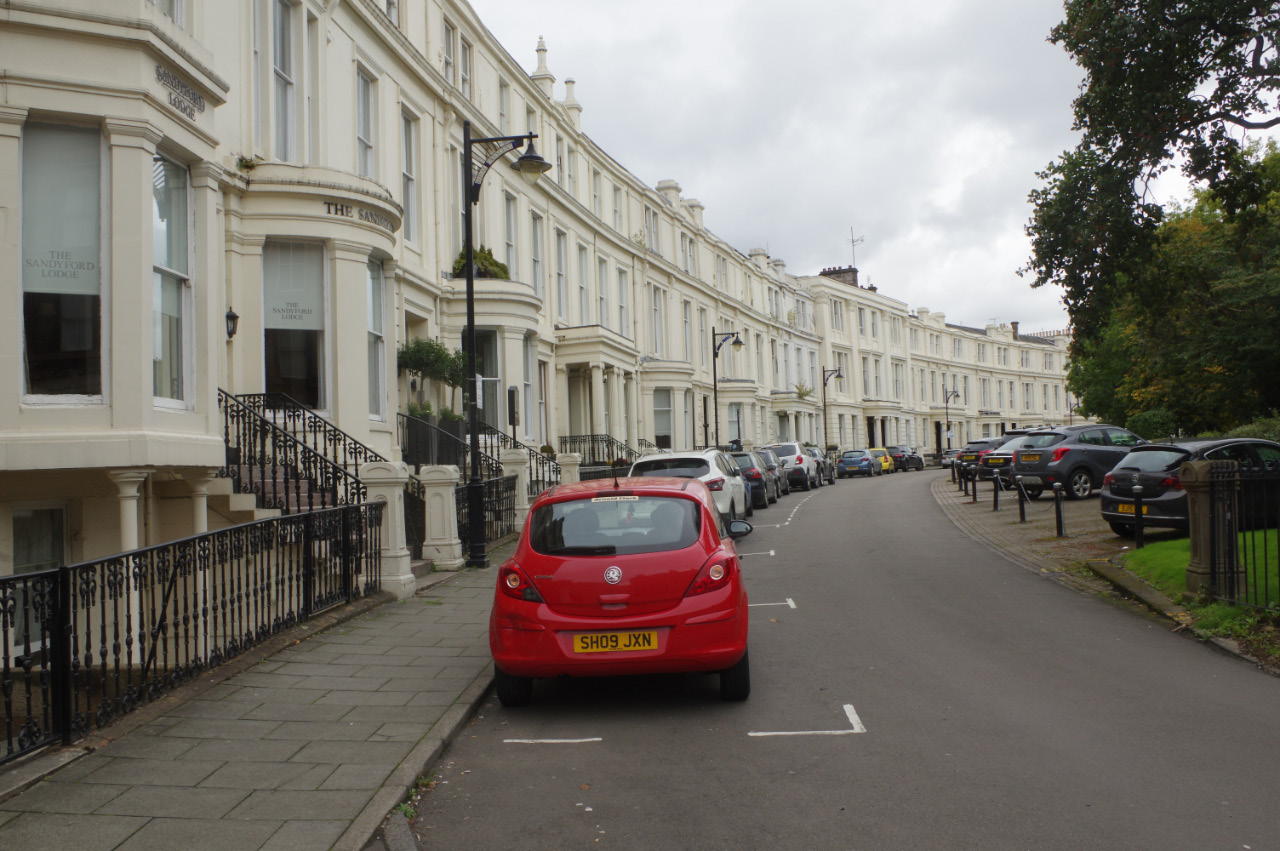
Royal Crescent

By the turn of the 20th century, the area was entirely built upon with all available space directly north of the river at Lancefield, Finnieston and Kelvinhaugh taken up by warehouses, engineering works and dockyards, with the housing for the workers in those industries at Anderston and Yorkhill, as well as those streets in Sandyford north of St Vincent Street, becoming increasingly crowded. But further north, the area around Sauchiehall Street largely retained its original character as a home for the middle classes, with upmarket (and upwind of industrial smog) developments at Kelvingrove on the southern fringe of the park of the same name helping to maintain the area's prestige as a leafy suburb close to the heart of Glasgow. In 1911, the large Mitchell Library was completed, adjoining the existing St Andrew's Halls for public functions (opened 1877). Churches in the area included Kent Road UP Church, Sandyford UP Church (later Highlanders' Memorial UF Church), Berkeley Street UP Church (later the site of a dance hall) and Trinity Church at Claremont Street. Kent Road Public School was within the neighbourhood, with Finnieston Public School a short distance away to the south.

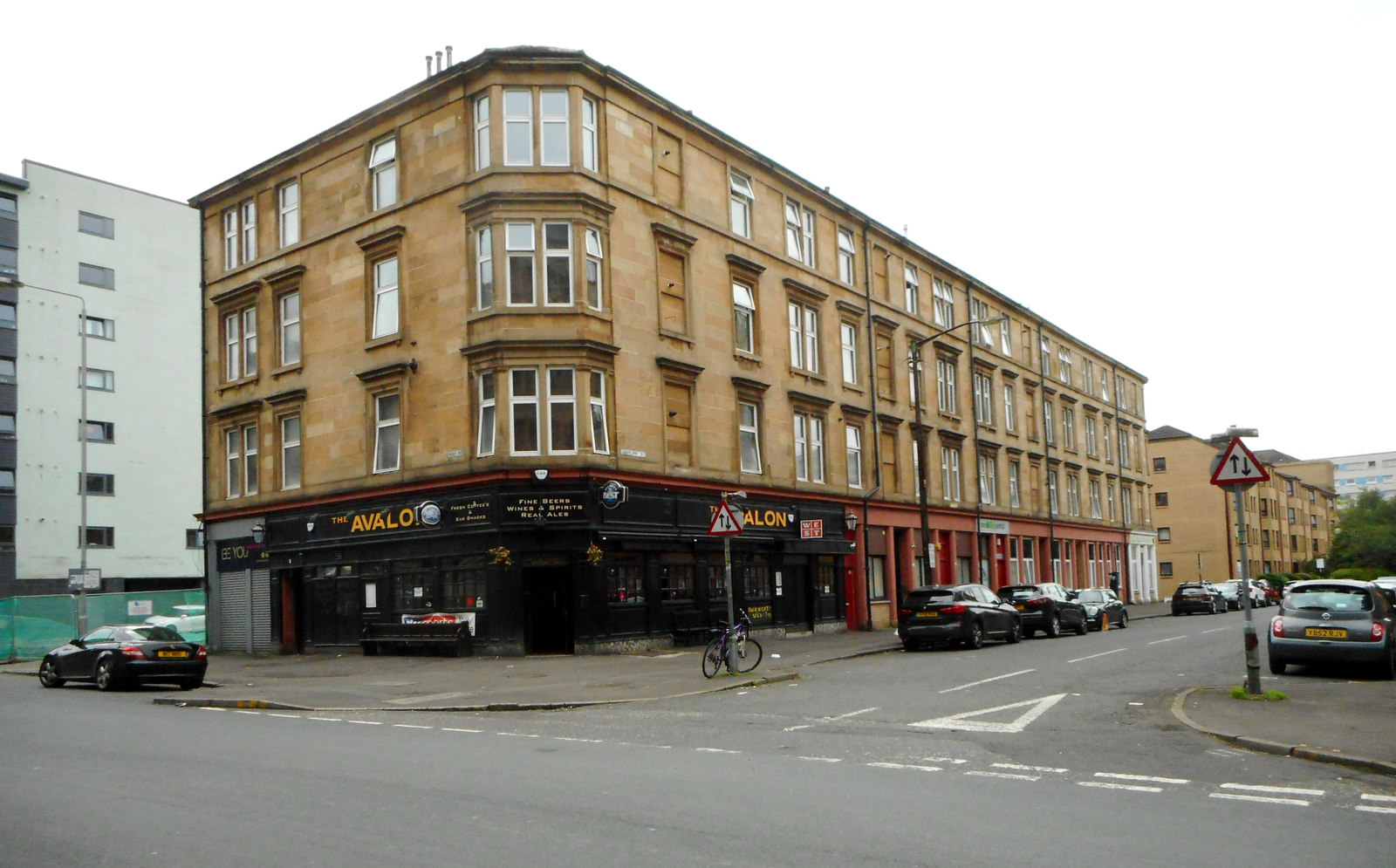
Tenement including the Avalon Bar, Kent Road, 2019

Much changed in the latter 20th century. Many of the townhouses in the area around Sauchiehall Street were converted to office use, with one block demolished and replaced by a modernist office block out of keeping with the rest of the architecture other than in its height; the decline of traditional industries led to economic hardship across the city, and locally around Argyle Street; the St Andrews Halls suffered a major fire and were converted to an extension of the Mitchell Library; everything to the east of the library was disconnected (at least visually) from the city centre by the construction of the M8 motorway, with the majority of the old Anderston tenements also disappearing as a Comprehensive Redevelopment Area with brutalist apartments and tower blocks overlooking the motorway in their place; and in the southern portion of Sandyford around Kent Road, several blocks of tenements considered sub-standard due to sanitation issues (i.e. outside or shared toilets) were demolished and replaced by a small playpark; and the Kent Road School was also demolished in 1973, replaced by new buildings for Woodside Secondary School previously located further north at Woodlands. Dalian House, a civic building for Strathclyde Regional Council completed south of the Mitchell Library in 1990, showed a respect for the design of the remaining older buildings surrounding it by being prohibited from exceeding their height.

== 21st Century ==
In the early 21st century, the area's profile changed again, with Woodside Secondary closing in 1999 and Glasgow Gaelic School moving into the buildings in 2006, while the majority of 'gap sites' were filled by new blocks of apartments (including a conversion of Kent Road UP Church), resulting in a variety of building styles and ages being found among the small number of streets in the area. The neighbourhood includes the former Trinity Church building which was previously known as the Henry Wood Hall while home to the Royal Scottish National Orchestra until 2012, after which it became a church once again; and a large modern Sikh temple, the Central Gurdwara Singh Sabha (completed 2016), next to their smaller, older facility in the same street.

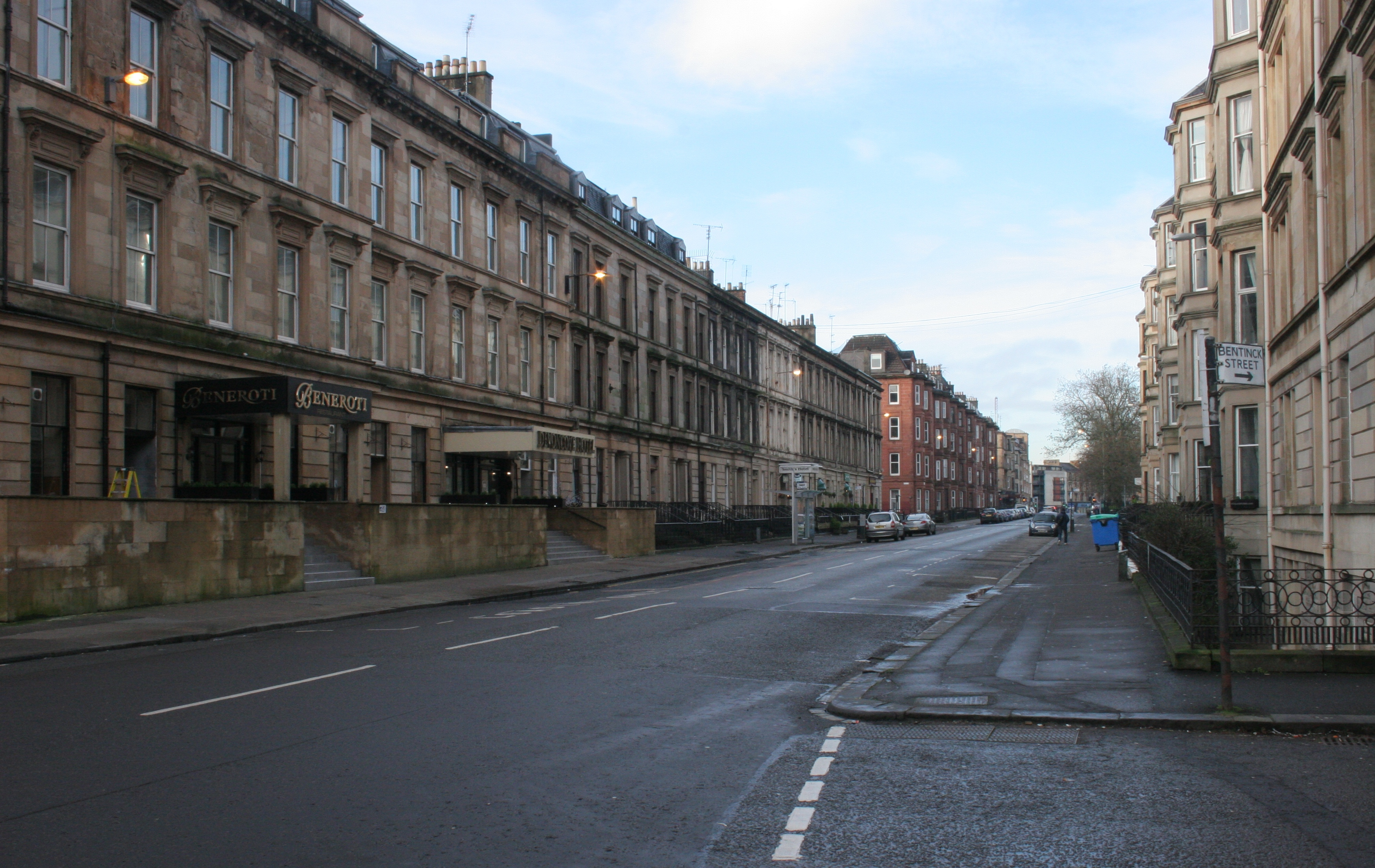
Sauchiehall Street looking west - buildings are mainly hotels

Owing to its location between the tourist areas of Glasgow city centre, the West End (centred on Byres Road) and the entertainment venues at the SEC Centre, a large number of hotels are present among tenements near to Kelvingrove Park, mostly on Sauchiehall Street. There are also several established restaurants and bars, a provision which increased markedly in the 2010s as the wider area (usually marketed as Finnieston) around Argyle Street became more popular as a destination in its own right.

The local Sandyford Post Office is also in this area on Argyle Street, and further west is The Church of Scotland Sandyford Henderson Memorial Church; which includes Finnieston, Kelvinhaugh and Yorkhill within its parish borders but none of the former Sandyford Town Council ward which instead falls under the parish of the Anderston-Kelvingrove Parish Church. In medical circles, the name is familiar as Sandyford Central, the headquarters of a NHS facility that mainly provides services relating to sexual health and has expanded to branches elsewhere in the city.

There are three railway stations in the vicinity of Sandyford: Exhibition Centre and Anderston on the Argyle Line connecting with Glasgow Central, and Charing Cross on the North Clyde Line connecting with Glasgow Queen Street. Finnieston railway station just off Argyle Street was once the nearest, but this closed in 1917; a century later, the local community council shared its plans regarding a possible reopening of the station seeking input from residents.

== See also ==
- Sandyford murder case
