= List of listed buildings in Glasgow/3 =

This is a list of listed buildings in Glasgow, Scotland.

== List ==
Name	Location	Date Listed	Grid Ref. (Note: Sometimes known as OSGB36, the grid reference (where provided) is based on the British national grid reference system used by the Ordnance Survey. • "Guide to National Grid". Ordnance Survey. • "Get-a-map". Ordnance Survey.)	Geo-coordinates	Notes	LB Number (Note: Historic Environment Scotland assign a unique alphanumeric identifier to each designated site in Scotland, for listed buildings this always begins with "LB", for example "LB12345".)	Image
2B Kirklee Road And 15 Kirklee Terrace				55°52′51″N 4°17′47″W	Category B	32552	Upload Photo
1-14 (Inclusive Nos) Kirklee Terrace, With Railings, Gatepiers And 1-14 Kirklee Terrace Lane (Inclusive Numbers), Great Western Road				55°52′49″N 4°17′40″W	Category A	32553	Upload Photo
3-9 (Inclusive Nos) Lancaster Crescent And 3-9 (Inclusive Nos) Lancaster Crescent Lane; Great Western Road				55°52′57″N 4°18′06″W	Category B	32556	Upload Photo
11 Lancaster Crescent, Redlands Hospital, Great Western Road				55°52′55″N 4°18′02″W	Category B	32557	Upload Photo
1-10 (Inclusive Nos) Lorraine Gardens And Gatepiers				55°52′47″N 4°18′06″W	Category B	32559	Upload Photo
3-9 (Odd Nos) Lorraine Road				55°52′47″N 4°18′03″W	Category B	32560	Upload Photo
1-10 (Inclusive Nos) Marchmont Terrace				55°52′40″N 4°17′46″W	Category B	32565	Upload Photo
15-19 (Odd Nos) Mirrlees Drive				55°52′55″N 4°17′49″W	Category B	32567	Upload Photo
28-30 And 32-34 (Even Nos) Highburgh Road And 10 And 13 Beaumont Gate				55°52′28″N 4°17′54″W	Category B	32522	Upload Photo
66-84 (Even Nos) Highburgh Road				55°52′29″N 4°18′06″W	Category C(S)	32523	Upload Photo
1-20 (Inclusive Nos) Huntly Gardens, 12 Saltoun Street, 5 Kew Lane And Gatepiers				55°52′43″N 4°17′40″W	Category B	32528	Upload Photo
21-34 (Inclusive Nos) Huntly Gardens, 26 Athole Lane				55°52′39″N 4°17′42″W	Category B	32529	Upload Photo
21-39 (Odd Nos) Hyndland Road				55°52′54″N 4°18′13″W	Category A	32530	Upload Photo
10-20 (Even Nos) Hyndland Road And 1 Montague Lane				55°52′54″N 4°18′16″W	Category B	32533	Upload Photo
84-98 (Even Nos) Hyndland Road, 1-3 (Odd Nos) Novar Drive, 2-4 (Even Nos) Queensborough Gardens				55°52′45″N 4°18′22″W	Category B	32534	Upload Photo
162 Hyndland Road, Royal Bank Of Scotland, Hyndland Branch				55°52′35″N 4°18′23″W	Category B	32535	Upload Photo
11-24 (Inclusive Nos) Kensington Gate				55°52′47″N 4°17′55″W	Category B	32536	Upload Photo
1-20 (Inclusive Nos) Kew Terrace, Great Western Road				55°52′43″N 4°17′35″W	Category B	32539	Upload another image
3-11 (Inclusive Nos) Crown Terrace, Rear Gardens Walls And Cast-Iron Railings				55°52′32″N 4°18′10″W	Category B	32493	Upload another image
12-17 (Inclusive Nos) Crown Terrace, With Gatepiers And 12 Sydenham Lane				55°52′33″N 4°18′13″W	Category B	32494	Upload Photo
1-9 (Inclusive Nos) Devonshire Terrace, And Devonshire Terrace Lane, Great Western Road				55°52′58″N 4°18′21″W	Category B	32496	Upload Photo
91-111, 117-127 (Odd Nos) And 118-134 (Even Nos) Dowanhill Street And 58-60 (Even Nos) Dowanside Road				55°52′30″N 4°17′58″W	Category B	32497	Upload another image
16-26 (Even Nos) Dowanside Road And 2-4 Victoria Crescent Road				55°52′31″N 4°17′43″W	Category C(S)	32502	Upload another image
48 And 48A Dowanside Road (Kings Gate)				55°52′33″N 4°17′53″W	Category B	32503	Upload Photo
15 And 19-25 (Odd Nos) Dundonald Road, With Retaining Walls And Railings				55°52′44″N 4°17′54″W	Category C(S)	32507	Upload another image See more images
730 Great Western Road; Botanic Gardens, Kibble Palace				55°52′44″N 4°17′18″W	Category A	32513	Upload another image See more images
730 Great Western Road; Botanic Gardens, Lodges At Queen Margaret Drive				55°52′41″N 4°17′24″W	Category B	32514	Upload Photo
Great Western Road And Queen Margaret Drive, Botanic Gardens, Police Box				55°52′41″N 4°17′24″W	Category B	32515	Upload Photo
1-11 (Inclusive Nos) Great Western Terrace, 2-34 (Even Nos) Great Western Terrace Lane, 1 And 1B Westbourne Gardens And 19 Westbourne Gardens, With Railings, Lamp Brackets, Boundary And Retaining Walls, Great Western Road				55°52′51″N 4°18′01″W	Category A	32517	Upload another image
3-15 (Inclusive Nos) Grosvenor Crescent And 8, 16, 18 And 20 Grosvenor Crescent Lane				55°52′40″N 4°17′34″W	Category B	32519	Upload Photo
1-17 (Inclusive Nos) Grosvenor Terrace, Great Western Road				55°52′41″N 4°17′31″W	Category A	32520	Upload another image
35A-44 (Inclusive Nos) Athole Gardens				55°52′35″N 4°17′41″W	Category C(S)	32472	Upload another image
1-9 (Inclusive Nos) Beaumont Gate				55°52′29″N 4°17′54″W	Category B	32473	Upload Photo
14-18 (Inclusive Nos) Beaumont Gate				55°52′29″N 4°17′52″W	Category B	32474	Upload Photo
1-16 (Inclusive Nos) Belhaven Terrace And 17-28A (Inclusive Nos) Belhaven Terrace West, Great Western Road				55°52′46″N 4°17′45″W	Category B	32475	Upload Photo
11-15 (Inclusive Nos) Bowmont Gardens				55°52′39″N 4°17′51″W	Category B	32480	Upload Photo
28-40 (Even Nos) Cleveden Drive, With Walls And Gatepiers				55°52′59″N 4°18′02″W	Category B	32484	Upload Photo
4-8 (Even Nos) Cleveden Road, With Gatepiers And Walls				55°52′59″N 4°18′08″W	Category B	32487	Upload Photo
3-10 (Inclusive Nos) Crown Circus And 1, 1A And 2 Crown Terrace And 15 And 17 Crown Road North, With Gatepiers And Retaining Wall				55°52′34″N 4°18′03″W	Category A	32489	Upload Photo
1-14 (Inclusive Nos) Crown Gardens And Archway To Crown Circus Lane, Gatepiers, Walled And Railed Rear Gardens				55°52′34″N 4°18′08″W	Category B	32490	Upload another image
54-82 (Even Nos) 29-61 (Odd Nos) Crosshill Avenue				55°49′53″N 4°15′31″W	Category B	32429	Upload another image See more images
109 Dixon Avenue, Belleisle Street, Holy Cross Church And Presbytery				55°50′04″N 4°15′28″W	Category B	32432	Upload another image See more images
30, 32 Queen's Drive, St Rule				55°49′54″N 4°15′37″W	Category B	32448	Upload another image See more images
36, 38 Queen's Drive Including Gatepiers				55°49′54″N 4°15′39″W	Category C(S)	32450	Upload Photo
42-76 (Even Nos) Queen's Drive, Royal Crescent Including Railings				55°49′58″N 4°15′48″W	Category B	32452	Upload another image See more images
78-118 (Even Nos) Queen's Drive 541-545 (Odd Nos) Victoria Road And 370-372 (Even Nos) Langside Road, Crosshill				55°50′01″N 4°15′53″W	Category B	32453	Upload another image See more images
144-150 (Even Nos) Queen's Drive And 4 Maybank Street Including Railings				55°50′03″N 4°16′05″W	Category B	32455	Upload another image See more images
152-164 (Even Nos) Queen's Drive And 85, 89 Albert Avenue Including Railings				55°50′04″N 4°16′08″W	Category B	32456	Upload another image See more images
465-505 (Odd Nos) Victoria Road 1-5 (Odd Nos) Albert Road And 8-18 (Even Nos) Dixon Avenue				55°50′05″N 4°15′54″W	Category B	32461	Upload another image See more images
69 Dixon Road And Elevation To Warren Street, Govanhill Workspace, Former New Bridgegate Church And Hall				55°50′00″N 4°15′11″W	Category B	32467	Upload another image See more images
1-20 (Inclusive Nos) Athole Gardens, With Railings And Piers To Gardens				55°52′37″N 4°17′41″W	Category B	32471	Upload another image
754-782 (Even Nos) Pollokshaws Road, 5, 7, Nithsdale Road And 2 Regent Park Square				55°50′10″N 4°16′16″W	Category B	32403	Upload another image See more images
848-856 (Even Nos) Pollokshaws Road 1 Marywood Square And 2 Vennard Gardens				55°50′04″N 4°16′27″W	Category B	32406	Upload another image See more images
4-50 (Even Nos) Queen Square				55°50′08″N 4°16′22″W	Category B	32407	Upload Photo
3-49 (Odd Nos) Regent Park Square				55°50′11″N 4°16′23″W	Category B	32410	Upload another image See more images
4-44 (Even Nos) Regent Park Square				55°50′12″N 4°16′22″W	Category B	32411	Upload another image See more images
201 And 233 Tantallon Road, Langside Primary School Including Janitor's Lodge, Playground Walls And Gatepiers				55°49′35″N 4°16′55″W	Category B	32413	Upload Photo
52, 54 Albert Road And 326 Langside Road Including The Hampden Bar				55°50′03″N 4°15′50″W	Category C(S)	32418	Upload another image See more images
169-193 Allison Street (Odd Nos), 182-220 (Even Nos) Langside Road				55°50′13″N 4°15′43″W	Category C(S)	32422	Upload another image See more images
265-289 (Odd Nos) Allison Street 19, 21, 23 Garturk Street And 34 Daisy Street				55°50′09″N 4°15′32″W	Category A	32423	Upload another image See more images
13 And 27 Annette Street, Annette Street Primary School, Including Gatepiers And Railings				55°50′11″N 4°15′37″W	Category B	32424	Upload Photo
656, 660 Cathcart Road, (Formerly 125 Dixon Avenue) Dixon Halls Including Gatepiers And Railings				55°50′03″N 4°15′24″W	Category B	32427	Upload another image See more images
Maryhill Road, Forth And Clyde Canal Aqueduct				55°53′30″N 4°17′34″W	Category B	32354	Upload another image
23-53 (Odd Nos) Camphill Avenue, Iser Lane				55°49′37″N 4°16′31″W	Category B	32362	Upload Photo
157 Camphill Avenue Hazelwood				55°49′27″N 4°16′40″W	Category C(S)	32364	Upload another image See more images
44 Carmichael Place, Battlefield Primary School Including Gates, Gatepiers And Railings				55°49′29″N 4°16′19″W	Category B	32365	Upload another image
25, 25A Mansionhouse Road				55°49′32″N 4°16′30″W	Category A	32373	Upload another image See more images
29 & 29A Mansionhouse Road, Carmelite Monastery (Former Rawcliffe Lodge), Including Gate Piers, Railings, Former Stable Block And Boundary Walls				55°49′29″N 4°16′36″W	Category B	32375	Upload another image See more images
Marywood Square Lamp Standard In Front Of No 7				55°50′06″N 4°16′27″W	Category B	32376	Upload another image See more images
Marywood Square Lamp Standard In Front Of No 35				55°50′08″N 4°16′31″W	Category B	32378	Upload another image See more images
2, 2A-38 (Even Nos) Millbrae Crescent				55°49′20″N 4°16′33″W	Category A	32384	Upload Photo
1-10 (Inclusive Nos) Moray Place Including 81 Nithsdale Road				55°50′14″N 4°16′25″W	Category A	32386	Upload another image See more images
19-25 (Inclusive Nos) Moray Place, 53 Queen Square And 52 Marywood Square				55°50′11″N 4°16′33″W	Category B	32388	Upload another image
81-95 (Odd Nos) Nithsdale Drive 52, 58 Nithsdale Street, Salisbury Quadrant				55°50′15″N 4°16′17″W	Category B	32391	Upload Photo
18-80 (Even Nos) Nithsdale Road And 65 Nithsdale Street				55°50′12″N 4°16′15″W	Category B	32394	Upload another image See more images
22, 30 Nithsdale Street And 28 March Street				55°50′15″N 4°16′13″W	Category B	32395	Upload Photo
749-769 (Odd Nos) Pollokshaws Road And 181, 183 Queen's Drive And 3, 5 Balvicar Street				55°50′07″N 4°16′18″W	Category B	32399	Upload another image See more images
2 Beaconsfield Road, Kelvinside House, Retaining Walls, Balustrading And Gatepiers				55°53′09″N 4°18′17″W	Category B	32302	Upload Photo
2-15 (Inclusive Nos) Cleveden Crescent, Cleveden Crescent Lane (All Numbers South) Gatepiers, Boundary Walls And Retaining Walls				55°53′04″N 4°18′13″W	Category B	32305	Upload Photo
48 Cleveden Drive, Stoneleigh, And Gatepiers				55°53′01″N 4°18′15″W	Category A	32306	Upload Photo
60 Cleveden Drive, Boundary Walls And Gatepiers				55°53′05″N 4°18′25″W	Category B	32312	Upload Photo
3 Cleveden Road And 992 Great Western Road, Gatepiers And Boundary Walls, Now Known As Balmanno House				55°52′59″N 4°18′12″W	Category C(S)	32313	Upload Photo
17-45 (Odd Nos) Cleveden Road And 1-9B Beaconsfield Road				55°53′04″N 4°18′11″W	Category B	32315	Upload Photo
Great Western Road, Kelvin Court, 1-52 And 53-100				55°53′15″N 4°18′37″W	Category B	32321	Upload another image
1089 Great Western Road, 1 Whittingehame Gardens				55°53′09″N 4°18′53″W	Category C(S)	32322	Upload Photo
64 Burnhouse Street, Maryhill Public Baths And Wash Houses				55°53′27″N 4°17′31″W	Category B	32348	Upload Photo
1512-1528 (Even Nos) Maryhill Road				55°53′29″N 4°17′28″W	Category C(S)	32353	Upload Photo
1-28 (Inclusive Nos) Woodside Place And 138, 140 Elderslie Street				55°52′01″N 4°16′23″W	Category A	32270	Upload Photo
1-22 (Inclusive Nos) Woodside Terrace, 11-63 Woodside Terrace Lane, 4 Claremount Place				55°52′04″N 4°16′30″W	Category A	32271	Upload Photo
143, 153 Garscadden Road, Drumchapel Old Parish Church And Hall, Church Of Scotland				55°54′23″N 4°21′54″W	Category C(S)	32273	Upload another image
26-40 (Even Nos) Balshagray Drive With Retaining Walls And Gatepiers				55°52′27″N 4°19′38″W	Category C(S)	32286	Upload Photo
42-56 (Even Nos) Balshagray Drive And 2 Marlborough Avenue, With Retaining Walls And Gatepiers				55°52′29″N 4°19′37″W	Category B	32287	Upload Photo
206-216 (Even Nos) Broomhill Drive				55°52′32″N 4°19′15″W	Category B	32291	Upload Photo
19-33 (Odd Nos) Broomhill Terrace And 2 Central Avenue				55°52′24″N 4°19′37″W	Category C(S)	32293	Upload Photo
1-21 (Inclusive Nos) Park Terrace And 18-24 (Inclusive Nos) Woodlands Terrace And 2-4 (Even Nos) Park Terrace East Lane And 3 Park Street South				55°52′07″N 4°16′46″W	Category A	32245	Upload another image
1-18 Queen's Crescent And 106 West Princes Street And 1 Melrose Street				55°52′15″N 4°16′12″W	Category B	32247	Upload Photo
14-42 (Even Nos) University Avenue, Students Union				55°52′21″N 4°17′06″W	Category B	32252	Upload another image
6-10 (Even Nos) Westend Park Street				55°52′12″N 4°16′29″W	Category C(S)	32253	Upload Photo
61-91 And 117, 123 (Odd Nos) West Princes Street				55°52′13″N 4°16′16″W	Category B	32258	Upload Photo
4-48 (Even Nos) West Princes Street And 201 St George's Road				55°52′13″N 4°16′09″W	Category B	32259	Upload Photo
1-17 (Inclusive Nos) Woodlands Terrace				55°52′06″N 4°16′39″W	Category B	32266	Upload another image
6-19 (Inclusive No) Woodside Crescent				55°52′03″N 4°16′19″W	Category A	32268	Upload Photo
1-12 (Inclusive Nos) Lynedoch Place				55°52′10″N 4°16′34″W	Category B	32222	Upload another image
21-23 (Odd Nos) Lynedoch Street				55°52′06″N 4°16′30″W	Category B	32226	Upload Photo
1-27 (Inclusive Nos) Newton Place Gatepiers And Retaining Wall To Sauchiehall Street				55°51′59″N 4°16′32″W	Category B	32230	Upload Photo
329-345 (Odd Nos) North Woodside Road				55°52′32″N 4°16′33″W	Category B	32231	Upload Photo
7, 9, 11, 15, 17, 19, 21, 23 Oakfield Avenue And 14-16 (Even Nos) Glasgow Street				55°52′30″N 4°17′02″W	Category B	32232	Upload Photo
27-29 (Odd Nos) Oakfield Avenue				55°52′28″N 4°17′03″W	Category B	32233	Upload Photo
41-53 (Odd Nos) Oakfield Avenue And 18 Great George Street				55°52′27″N 4°17′04″W	Category A	32235	Upload Photo
57-69 (Odd Nos) Oakfield Avenue				55°52′25″N 4°17′06″W	Category B	32236	Upload Photo
1-29 (Inclusive Nos) Park Circus And 9 Park Street South				55°52′11″N 4°16′41″W	Category A	32238	Upload another image See more images
1-17 (Odd Nos) And 2-8 (Even Nos) Park Circus Place				55°52′07″N 4°16′40″W	Category A	32239	Upload another image
1-6 (Inclusive Nos) Park Gardens And Park Gardens Lane				55°52′05″N 4°16′49″W	Category A	32240	Upload another image
1-10 (Inclusive Nos) Park Quadrant				55°52′14″N 4°16′46″W	Category A	32243	Upload another image
21-27 (Odd Nos) Carnarvon Street And 27-29 (Odd Nos) Baliol Street				55°52′08″N 4°16′16″W	Category B	32184	Upload Photo
1-12 (Inclusive Nos) Claremont Terrace 1 Claremont Place And Gatepiers To Claremont Terrace Lane				55°52′04″N 4°16′40″W	Category A	32185	Upload Photo
12, 14, 16, 18, 20, 22, 24, 26, 30, 32, 34, 36, 38 Gibson Street And 89 Otago Street				55°52′21″N 4°16′55″W	Category C(S)	32190	Upload Photo
1-5 (Odd Nos) Glasgow Street And 46-48 (Even Nos) Otago Street				55°52′27″N 4°16′56″W	Category B	32192	Upload Photo
79-99 Great Western Road				55°52′18″N 4°16′15″W	Category B	32199	Upload Photo
445-459 (Odd Nos) Great Western Road And 6 Caledonian Crescent, 1-8 (Inclusive Nos) Caledonian Mansions				55°52′30″N 4°16′52″W	Category A	32200	Upload Photo
499-505 (Odd Nos) Great Western Road, 4 Bank Street (Former Cooper's Building)				55°52′31″N 4°16′58″W	Category B	32202	Upload Photo
6-36 (Even Nos) Hamilton Park Avenue				55°52′35″N 4°16′59″W	Category B	32206	Upload Photo
2-28 (Inclusive) Lansdowne Crescent And 386 Great Western Road				55°52′27″N 4°16′36″W	Category B	32215	Upload Photo
4-19 (Inclusive) Lynedoch Crescent And 6, 18, 20, 22, Lynedoch Street				55°52′08″N 4°16′28″W	Category B	32221	Upload Photo
5, 7, 11, 15, 19, 23, 25, 27 Ashley Street				55°52′10″N 4°16′25″W	Category B	32174	Upload Photo
3-25 (Odd Nos) And 10-30 (Even Nos) Baliol Street				55°52′08″N 4°16′18″W	Category B	32176	Upload another image
3-18 (Inclusive Nos) Belmont Crescent				55°52′37″N 4°16′53″W	Category B	32181	Upload Photo
40-44 (Even Nos) Fortrose Street, Hyndland Primary School With Ancillary Building, Boundary Walls, Gatepiers, Gates And Railings				55°52′21″N 4°18′26″W	Category C(S)	45782	Upload Photo
142 And 144 West Regent Street, Including Railings				55°51′49″N 4°15′36″W	Category B	46527	Upload Photo
33, 35 And 41 Oswald Street				55°51′28″N 4°15′37″W	Category C(S)	46591	Upload Photo
Cecil Street, 14-60 (Even Nos) Sardinia Terrace				55°52′35″N 4°17′17″W	Category B	47361	Upload Photo
30 Eldon Street, Former Janitor's House To Former Woodside Public School, With Gatepiers And Railings				55°52′20″N 4°16′47″W	Category B	48025	Upload Photo
35 Church Street, Former Church Street School, Including Swimming Pool Block, Janitor's House, Gatepiers, Boundary Walls And Railings				55°52′16″N 4°17′54″W	Category C(S)	48969	Upload Photo
42 Marwick Street And 9-29 Walter Street, Haghill Primary School Including Gate Piers, Boundary Walls And Railings And 16 Marwick Street (Janitor's House)				55°51′43″N 4°12′27″W	Category B	49650	Upload Photo
Montgomery Street And 22 Queen Mary Street, Queen Mary Street Nursery School, Dining Hall And Janitor's House Including Boundary Walls				55°50′55″N 4°13′10″W	Category B	49925	Upload Photo
124-130 Cubie Street, Former Telephone Exchange				55°51′09″N 4°13′25″W	Category C(S)	49926	Upload Photo
607 Gallowgate, Bellgrove Hotel				55°51′18″N 4°13′19″W	Category B	49927	Upload Photo
148 And 150 Monreith Road East Including Boundary Wall				55°48′59″N 4°16′00″W	Category C(S)	49929	Upload Photo
180 A-F Centre Street And 90 Wallace Street, Former Southern Fire Station Including Hose Tower And Courtyard Buildings				55°51′09″N 4°15′45″W	Category B	49931	Upload Photo
24 Willoughby Drive, 778-792 And 800-812 (Even Nos) Crow Road, 1571-1627 (Odd Nos) Great Western Road And 53-57 (Odd Nos) Ancaster Drive, Anniesland Mansions Including Boundary Walls				55°53′21″N 4°19′29″W	Category B	50011	Upload Photo
66 Victoria Crescent Road, Notre Dame Primary School Including Former Girls Training College And Gatepiers, Boundary Walls And Railings				55°52′37″N 4°17′56″W	Category C(S)	50026	Upload Photo
123, 131 And 133 Sauchiehall Street				55°51′52″N 4°15′28″W	Category B	50773	Upload Photo
2A Viewmount Drive, Former Maryhill Primary School Including Boundary Walls And Railings				55°53′41″N 4°17′39″W	Category C(S)	50893	Upload Photo
27 Broomhill Avenue, Former Balshagray Public School Including Swimming Pool And Janitor's House, Gates, Gatepiers And Railings				55°52′19″N 4°19′27″W	Category C(S)	51044	Upload Photo
156-174 (Even Nos) Bath Street				55°51′53″N 4°15′40″W	Category B	44596	Upload Photo
1-6 Redlands Terrace, (Inclusive Nos) Great Western Road				55°52′54″N 4°17′58″W	Category B	44039	Upload Photo
Clyde Street, Union Railway Bridge (Also Known As St Enoch Bridge) Over The River Clyde				55°51′11″N 4°14′58″W	Category B	44040	Upload another image See more images
122 Well Street, Bain Square, Calton New Parish Church				55°51′17″N 4°14′05″W	Category B	44053	Upload another image
536 Anniesland Road, British Telecom Building Former Scotstoun Telephone Exchange With Boundary Wall And Railings				55°53′09″N 4°21′01″W	Category C(S)	43083	Upload Photo
66 Boreland Drive, St David's Church, Church Of Scotland, With Railings And Gatepiers				55°53′28″N 4°21′19″W	Category B	43114	Upload Photo

== Key ==
The scheme for classifying buildings in Scotland is:

- Category A: "buildings of national or international importance, either architectural or historic; or fine, little-altered examples of some particular period, style or building type."
- Category B: "buildings of regional or more than local importance; or major examples of some particular period, style or building type, which may have been altered."
- Category C: "buildings of local importance; lesser examples of any period, style, or building type, as originally constructed or moderately altered; and simple traditional buildings which group well with other listed buildings."

In March 2016 there were 47,288 listed buildings in Scotland. Of these, 8% were Category A, and 50% were Category B, with the remaining 42% being Category C.

== See also ==
- List of listed buildings in Glasgow
