= Sandyford Henderson Memorial Church =

Sandyford Henderson Church
- Sandyford Henderson Memorial Parish Church
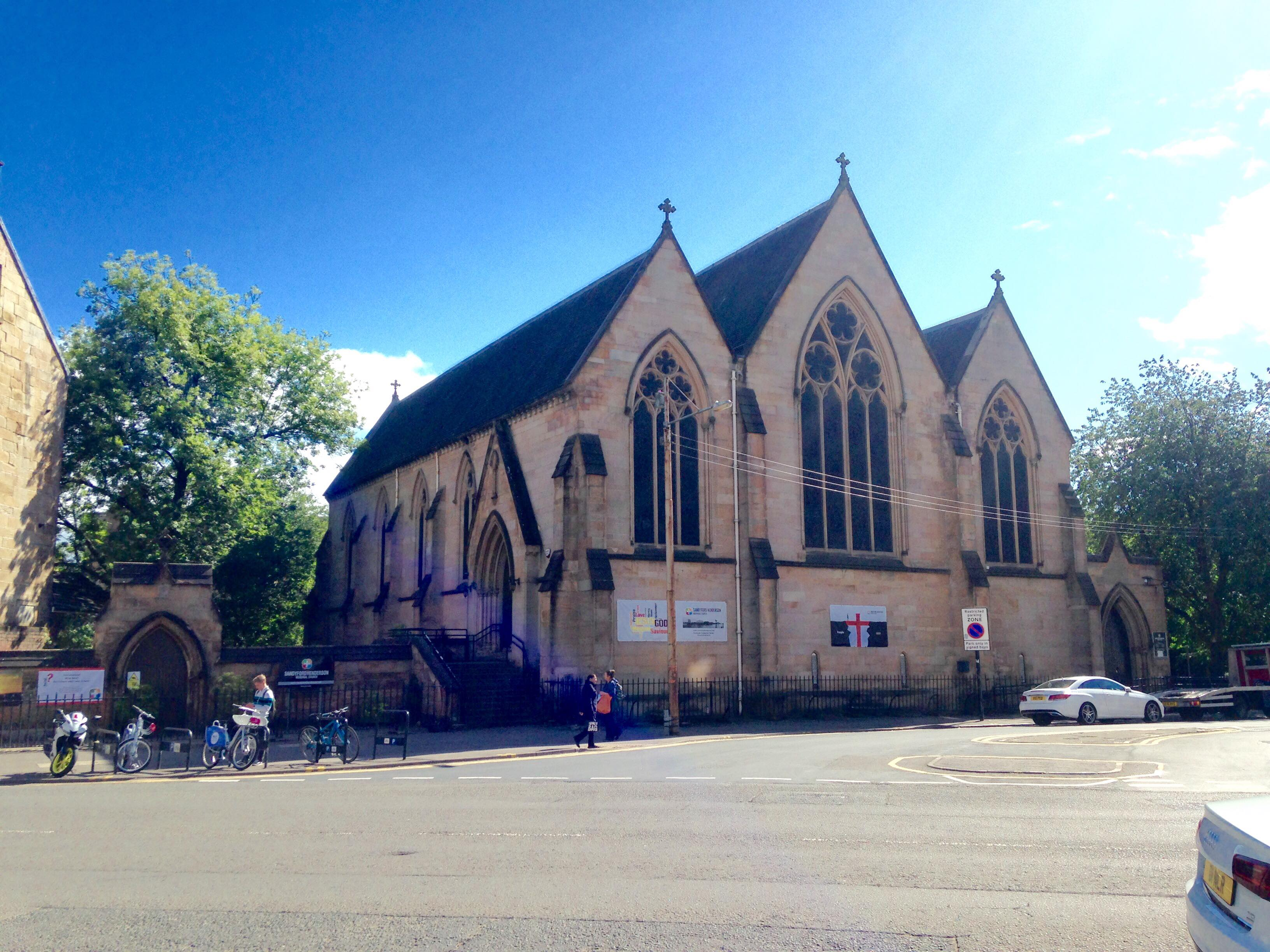
- The church in 2020
- Sandyford Henderson Church
- 55°51′54″N 4°17′09″W
- Location: Glasgow
- Country: Scotland
- Denomination: Church of Scotland
- Website: Church Website

History
- Status: Active

Architecture
- Functional status: Parish church
- Architect: John Thomas Emmett
- Architectural type: Church
- Style: Neo-Gothic
- Years built: 1854-1856
- Groundbreaking: 1854
- Completed: 1856

Administration
- Parish: Finnieston, Kelvinhaugh, Yorkhill

Listed Building – Category B
- Designated: 15 December 1970
- Reference no.: LB33075

Sandyford Henderson Memorial Church is a Parish church of the Church of Scotland that covers the Finnieston, Kelvinhaugh and Yorkhill areas of Glasgow, Scotland.

== History ==
The church was built in the Neo-Gothic style between 1854 and 1856, on designs by John Thomas Emmett, but then completed by John Honeyman. It was established as a chapel of ease for the south-west parish of the Barony Church, and became Sandyford Parish Church of the Church of Scotland in 1864. In 1938, it united with Henderson Memorial to form Sandyford Henderson Memorial Church.

== Works of Art ==
The church includes a number of stained glass windows in geometric/floral patterns made by Ballantine & Allan in 1857. The three pictorial west windows are the work of William Wailes, and which were made between 1859 and 1860. The stained glass windows were restored between 2008 and 2009. A WWI memorial was installed in the church in 1922 remembering the 20 men from the parish who died in the war. The exterior stonework of the church was restored in 2000, and an interior refurbishment was carried out in 2004.
