= Kelvinhaugh =

Coordinates: 55.864086°N 4.293087°W

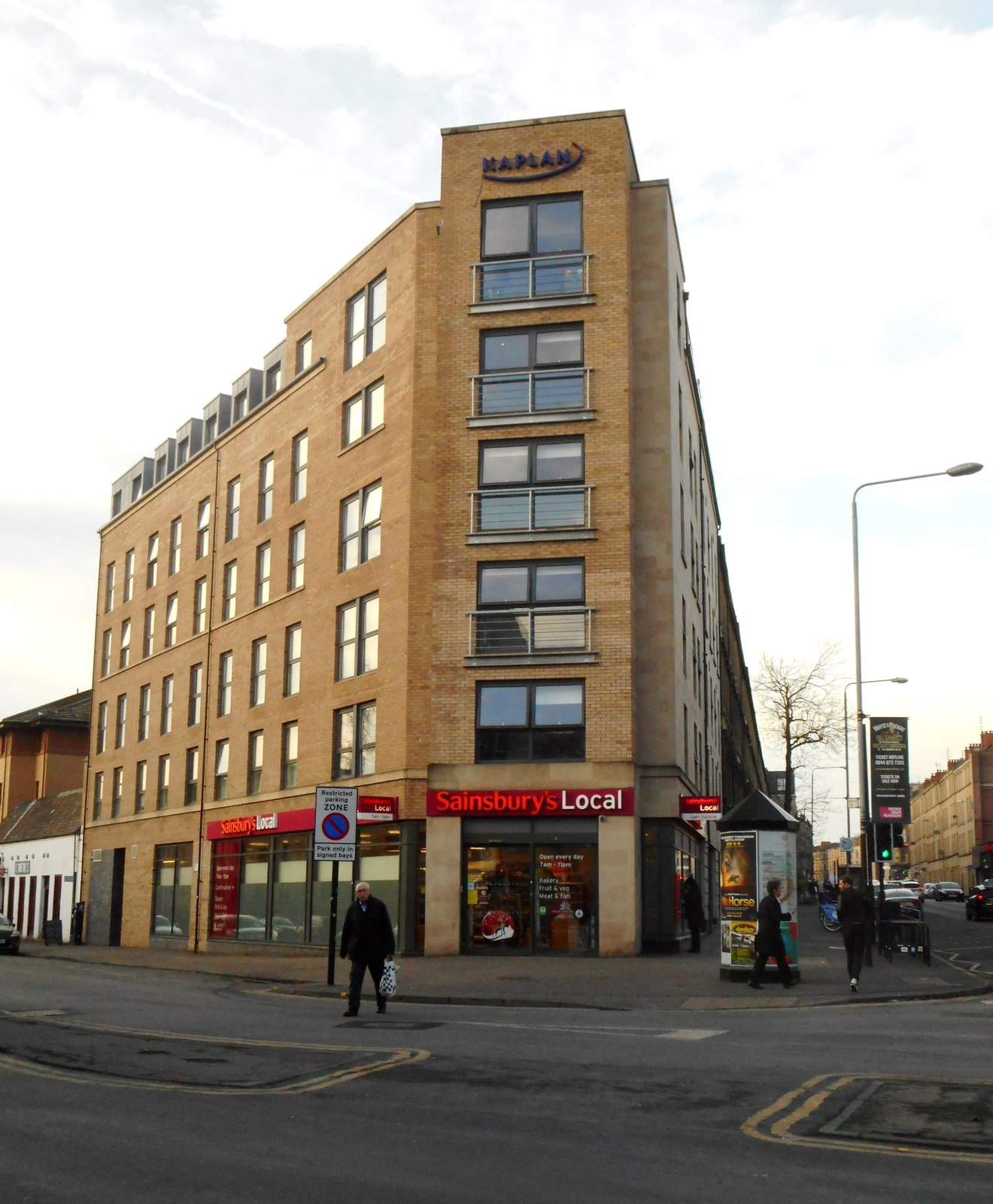
- Modern apartment block and supermarket off Argyle Street, 2018

- Location within Glasgow
- OS grid reference: NS565658
- Council area: Glasgow City Council
- Lieutenancy area: Glasgow
- Country: Scotland
- Sovereign state: United Kingdom
- Post town: GLASGOW
- Postcode district: G3 8
- Dialling code: 0141
- Police: Scotland
- Fire: Scottish
- Ambulance: Scottish
- UK Parliament: Glasgow Central
- Scottish Parliament: Glasgow Kelvin

Kelvinhaugh is a neighbourhood in the city of Glasgow, Scotland. It is situated directly north of the River Clyde in the West End of the city.

Its boundaries are not precisely defined, but roughly correspond to the River Clyde to the south, Yorkhill to the west, Finnieston to the east and Kelvingrove to the north, the division being Argyle Street. Smaller neighbourhoods such as Sandyford and Overnewton have also been absorbed into what is a continuous area of fairly dense urban development with little to distinguish them other than in the names of some local amenities, the same issue for Kelvinhaugh in relation to the more prominent Finnieston and Yorkhill.

== History ==
An area of flat land (this being the meaning of haugh, in contrast to the neighbouring Yorkhill which was on high ground) to the east of the mouth of the River Kelvin, Kelvinhaugh originally developed in the 19th century in connection with Glasgow's industries of shipbuilding and trading. Alexander Stephen and Sons had a yard there for 20 years from 1851 before moving across the river to their better-known facility at Linthouse. John Shearer & Sons took it over for another 30 years before moving to Scotstoun, and the yard then became the Yorkhill Quay. The A. & J. Inglis shipyard (in use 1862–1962) was a short distance to the west at Pointhouse. The collapse of these industries in the late 20th century led to a decline in the fortunes of the area (and the city), with both residential and commercial premises abandoned and the Kelvinhaugh name being used far less frequently.

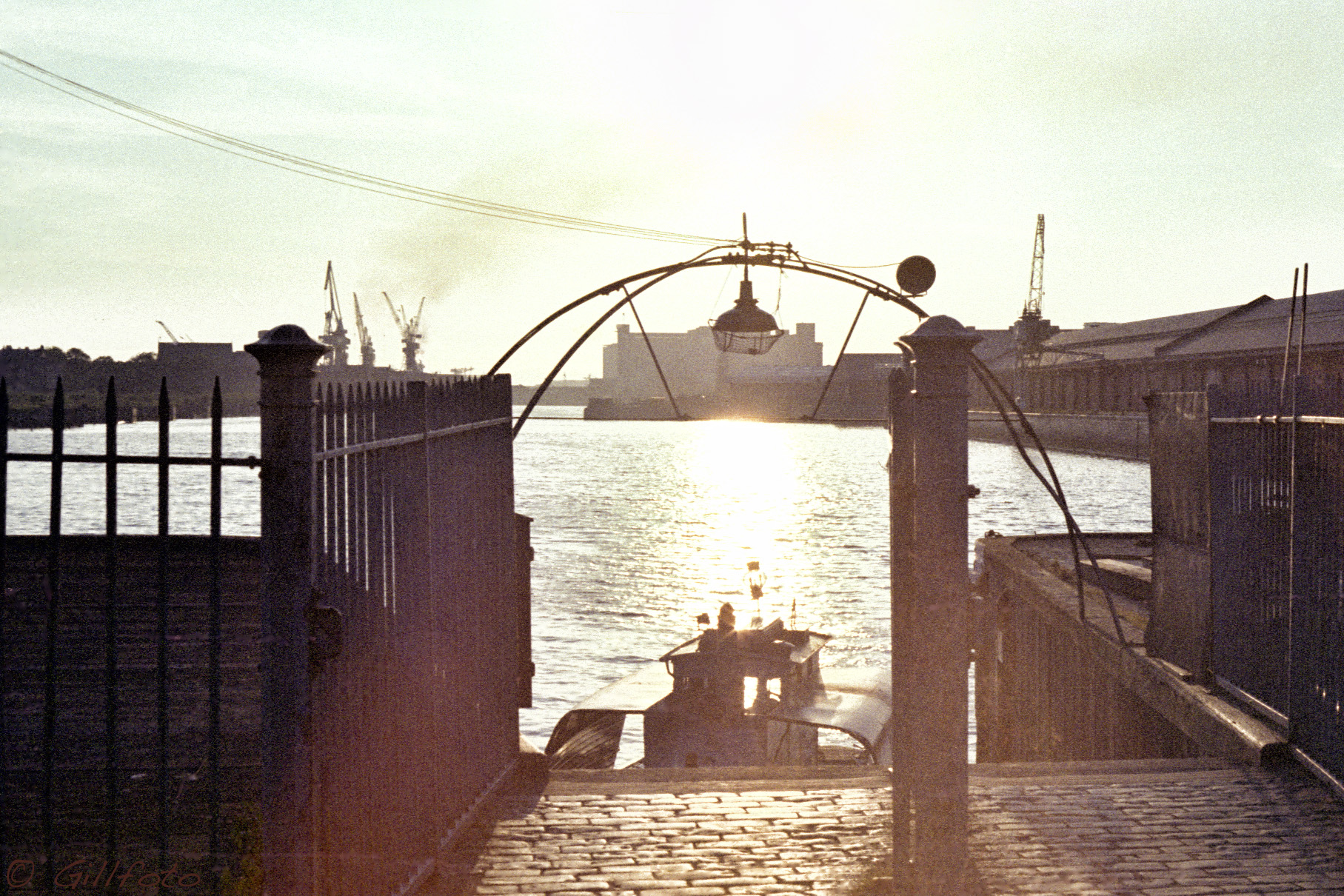
Kelvinhaugh slipway on the Clyde looking east towards Meadowside Granary, 1975

The resulting gap sites in the vicinity included the large expanse of the Queen's Dock, which was filled in and became the SEC Centre in the mid-1980s, with the Clyde Auditorium being added in the mid to late 1990s and the SSE Hydro following in the early 2010s. The increasing numbers of visitors to these venues led to a marked rise in popularity for Finnieston and neighbouring areas in the early 21st century, with several new cafés, bars, restaurants and specialist stores being established and revitalising the area around Argyle Street.

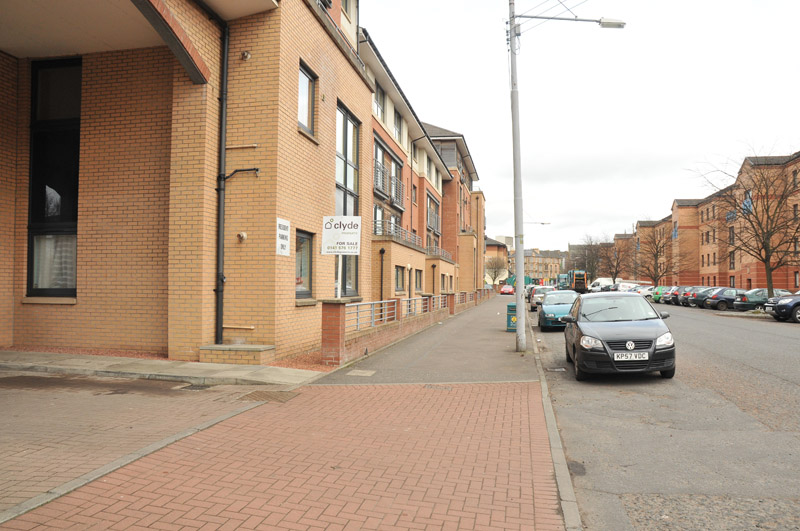
Looking up Kelvinhaugh Street at numerous new developments, 2010

At the same time, due to the proximity of the University of Glasgow and rising prices of student accommodation in traditional areas such as Kelvinbridge, Hillhead and Dowanhill, much of the vacant land in Kelvinhaugh was developed as modern student accommodation, although locals have noted that, as in other districts undergoing similar rapid change such as Partick, the increase in population has not led to a noticeable growth in community identity, since so many of the residents live there temporarily and focus most of their attentions on the University institutions, while the main thoroughfares became dirtier and harder to drive and park in. The local primary school dating from the 1880s became a private college, with its playground also being purchased for new flats.

== SWG3 and other changes ==
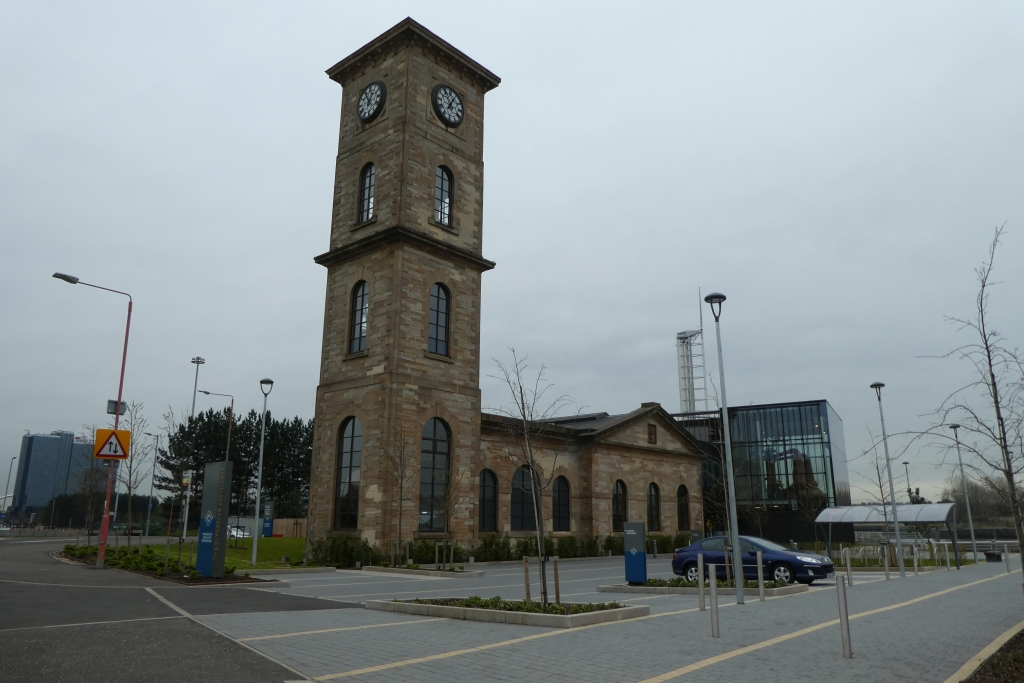
Converted pumphouse, now the Clydeside distillery

The area has become familiar to live music fans for the SWG3 arts venue (converted from disused railway arch workshops, metalwork yards and warehouses) which has grown in stature in Glaswegian entertainment circles following the closure of similar venues such as The Arches in the city centre and Soundhaus in Anderston, with its patrons also attracting more custom to local businesses. In addition to a number of existing works at SWG3, in 2019 a series of vibrant murals was added to the railway arches facing onto the adjacent Clydeside Expressway dual carriageway in 2019. Two teenagers died on the same night after attending a music event at the venue in August 2023.

On the opposite side of the expressway (accessible via a pedestrian/cycle bridge), in 2017 the landmark pumphouse which once controlled entry to the Queen's Dock, and then served as a visitor attraction for Glasgow's maritime heritage featuring the Glenlee (ship), was converted into a new Clydeside distillery. In 2011, the maritime heritage centre (and the Glenlee) had moved to the new Riverside Museum on the site of the Inglis shipyard.
