= Finnieston =

Coordinates: 55.862276°N 4.288058°W

Finnieston: Scots: Finniestoun
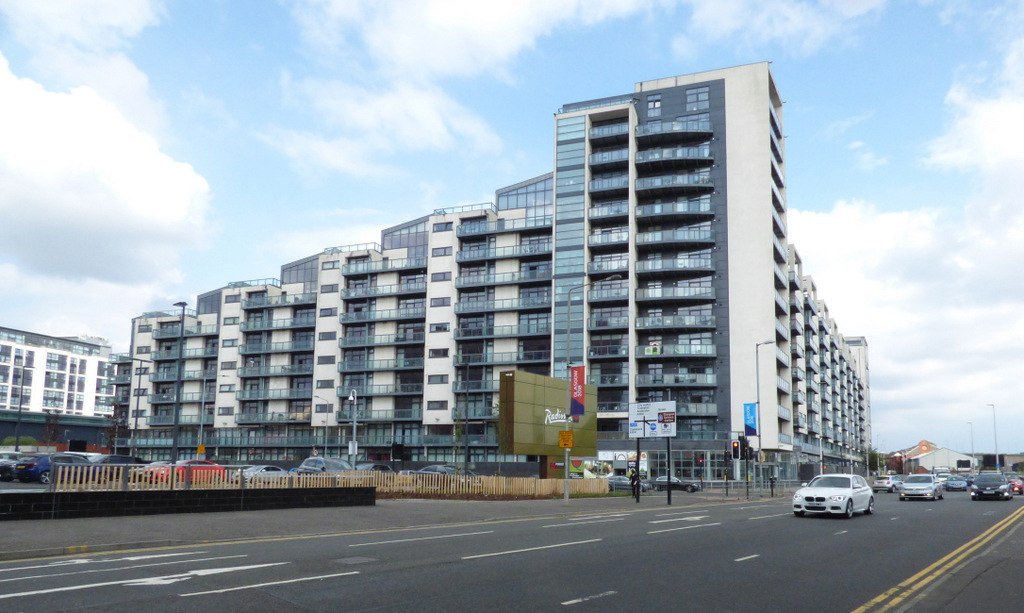
- Skyline of Finnieston, 2018

- Location within Glasgow
- Population: 8,989 (2016)
- OS grid reference: NS569656
- Council area: Glasgow City Council
- Lieutenancy area: Glasgow
- Country: Scotland
- Sovereign state: United Kingdom
- Post town: GLASGOW
- Postcode district: G3
- Dialling code: 0141
- Police: Scotland
- Fire: Scottish
- Ambulance: Scottish
- UK Parliament: Glasgow Central
- Scottish Parliament: Glasgow Kelvin

Finnieston is an area within the city of Glasgow, located in the central belt of Scotland, situated on the north bank of the River Clyde roughly between the city's West End and the city centre. The area is home to the SEC Centre and OVO Hydro, where many musical concerts, sporting events and conferences are held. It is also the location of Glasgow City Heliport, the former home base of both the Police Scotland air support unit and the Scottish Ambulance Service "Helimed 5".

Finnieston borders the neighbourhoods of Anderston, Kelvingrove, Kelvinhaugh, Overnewton and Sandyford. Historically, it covered a primarily industrial area between the River Clyde and the main thoroughfare at Argyle Street, but in the 21st century the wider area has become a popular tourist destination marketed under the Finnieston name.

== History ==
The village of Finnieston was established in 1768 on the lands of Stobcross by Matthew Orr, the owner of Stobcross House. Orr named the new village "Finnieston" in honour of the Reverend John Finnie, who had been his tutor.

The area has had a significant change in land-use since deindustrialisation. Previously, Finnieston was an area of warehouses and docks — the film 1980 film Death Watch used this aspect extensively in location shots.

In the early 21st century, Finnieston has been promoted and built up as a modern residential and leisure area, mirroring Shoreditch in Greater London. To this end many new bars and restaurants have been established. There is modern housing, office, retail, leisure and arts & culture developments. In 2016, Finnieston ranked first in The Times list "20 Hippest Places to Live in Britain" and The Herald claimed it the 'Hippest Place in Britain'.

Finnieston Street is a major junction on the Clydeside Expressway, and on 18 September 2006, was augmented with the addition of the Clyde Arc (known locally as "The Squinty Bridge") over the River Clyde. Finneiston forms part of the Glasgow City Council ward of Anderston/City/Yorkhill.

== Transport ==
Exhibition Centre railway station, on the Argyle Line was previously known as Stobcross station. Built by the Glasgow Central Railway and opened in 1894, it was closed in 1955. When it was reopened in 1979 it was called 'Finnieston' until it was given its current name in 1986. A separate Finnieston railway station of the Glasgow City and District Railway was opened in 1886 but is now disused, although reopening was under consideration in the late 2010s. However, the line is still in use as part of the North Clyde Line.

== Landmarks ==
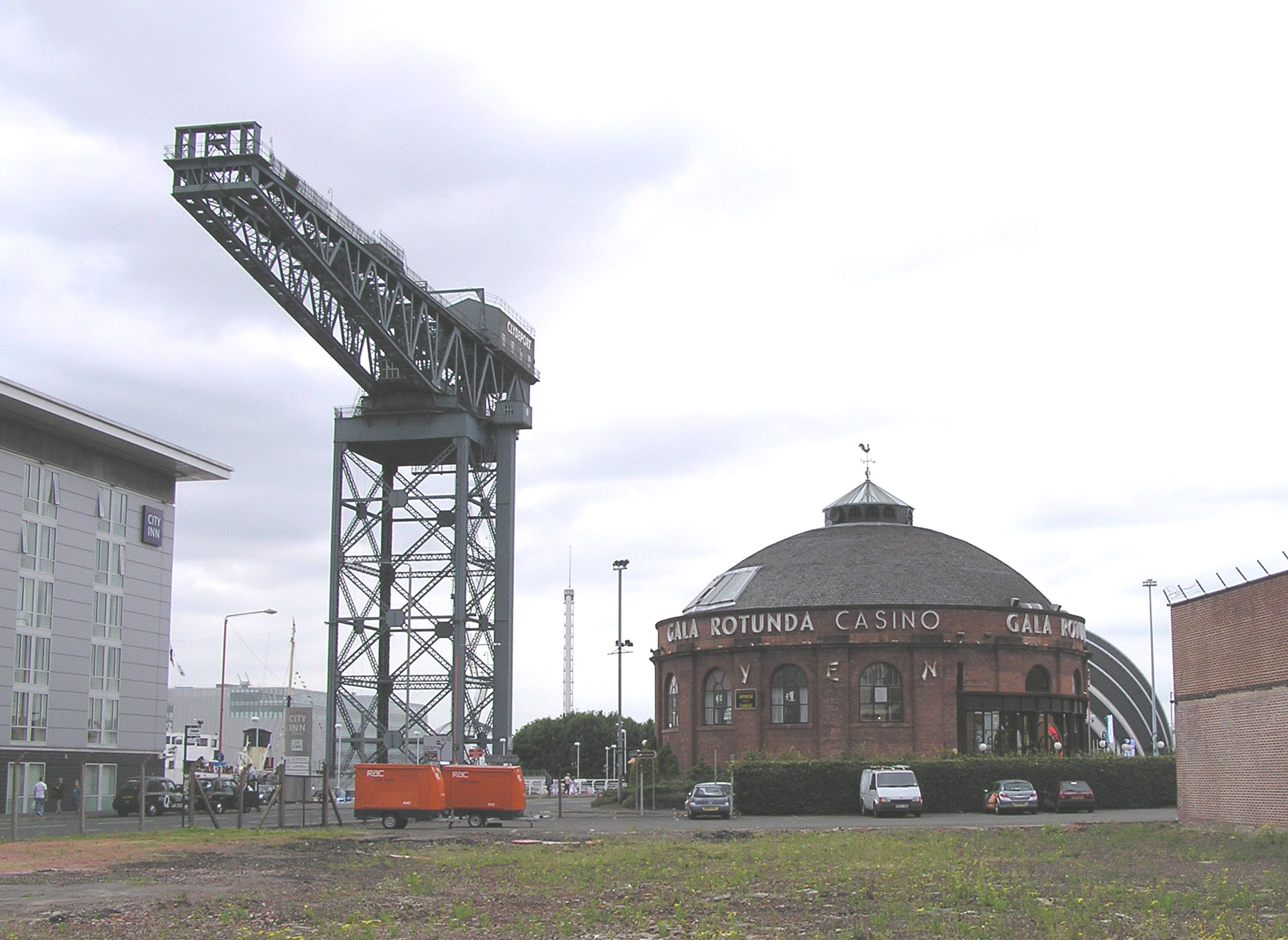
Finnieston with the Finnieston Crane and North Rotunda in the foreground and the Clyde Auditorium in the background

The Corunna Bowling Club located on A-Listed St Vincent Crescent has been a key feature of the area since 1850.

The Clyde Arc (known locally as "The Squinty Bridge") over the River Clyde sits to the south of Finnieston.

The SEC Centre, which opened in 1985 and where many musical concerts and important conferences are held, is located in Finnieston along with the Clyde Auditorium which opened in 1997.

The OVO Hydro (previously known as the SSE Hydro) opened in 2013 next to the SEC Centre and welcomed over 1 million visitors per year to the venue and surrounding area. In 2016 the OVO Hydro boasted the title as 8th largest venue in the world.

== Notable people ==
- Danny McGrain, footballer
- Sharleen Spiteri, musician
