= Dixon Halls =

Municipal building in Strathmiglo, Scotland

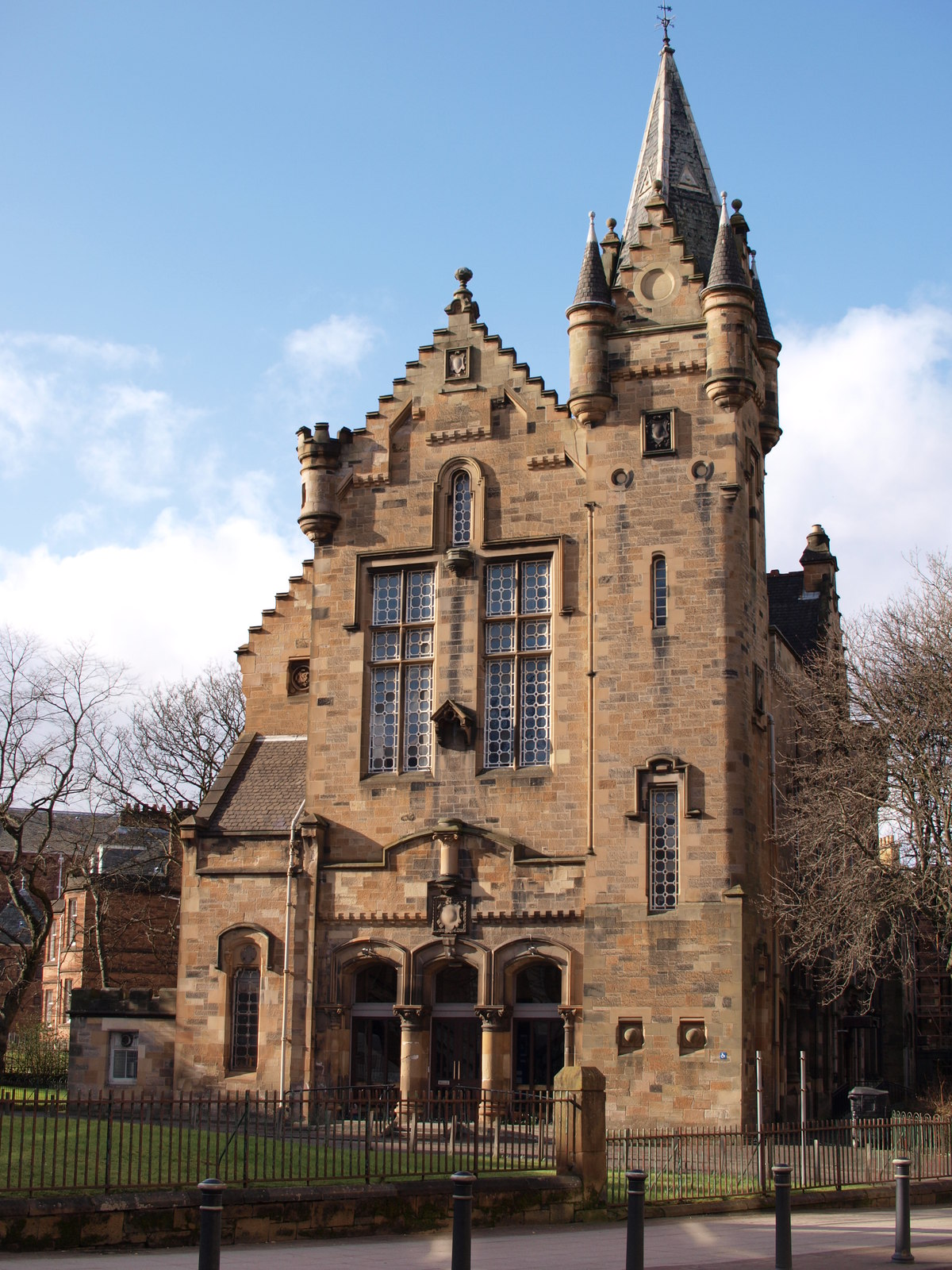
- Dixon Halls

- Shown in Glasgow
- 55.8342°N 4.2567°W
- Location: Cathcart Road, Glasgow

History
- Built: 1879

Site notes
- Architect: Frank Stirrat
- Architectural style: Scottish baronial style

Listed Building – Category B
- Official name: Dixon Halls, 650, 652, 654, 656 Cathcart Road, Govanhill, Glasgow
- Designated: 5 December 1989
- Reference no.: LB32427

Dixon Halls, formerly Crosshill and Govanhill Burgh Hall, is a daycare centre for elderly people and Category B listed building on Cathcart Road, Glasgow, Scotland.

== History ==
Following significant population growth, largely associated with their development as residential suburbs of Glasgow, Crosshill in Renfrewshire and Govanhill in Lanarkshire became police burghs in 1871 and 1877 respectively. In this context the proprietor of Govan Iron Works, William Smith Dixon, made an offer to pay for a new burgh hall to serve both burghs. The burgh leaders selected a site on Cathcart Road which was located on the border between the counties of Renfrewshire and Lanarkshire.

The new building was designed by the Glasgow architect, Frank Stirrat, in the Scottish baronial style, built in ashlar stone at a cost of £10,000 and was officially opened by the provost of Crosshill, George Browne, and the provost of Govanhill, Thomas Smith, on 12 December 1879. The design involved an asymmetrical main frontage of five bays facing the corner of what is now Dixon Avenue and Cathcart Road. The central section of three bays was formed by a loggia with Ionic order columns and architraves on the ground floor, a large mullioned and transomed window on the first floor and a stepped gable above. The left-hand bay, which was slightly projected forward, was fenestrated by a tall leaded window with a hood mould on the ground floor; at first floor level there was a wall, which was recessed, bearing a panel. The right-hand bay was formed by a four-stage tower: there was a tall leaded window with a hood mould in the second stage, a lancet window in the third stage and a panel flanked by bartizans in the fourth stage. The tower was surmounted by a stepped gable, a spire and a weather vane. Internally, the principal rooms were the shared assembly room on the first floor, and the courtrooms on the ground floor, one for each of Renfrewshire and Lanarkshire. The two courtrooms, both of which had their own external access, were located in their respective counties in accordance with the legislative requirements in place at the time.

Shortly after it opened, the building was renamed Dixon Halls, in honour of the businessman who had provided the funding. The building continued to serve as the meeting place of the two burghs until they were both annexed by the City of Glasgow in 1891. In accordance with a requirement stipulated by Dixon, when he provided the funding, the City of Glasgow agreed to donate £7,000 to the Glasgow Victoria Infirmary to recompense the burghs for the loss of their independence.

The Dixon Community, a charity established in 1972 to support elderly people and their carers, took over management of the building, refurbished the assembly hall and converted the structure into a daycare centre for elderly people, to a design by Michael and Sue Thornley, in 1978.

== See also ==
- List of listed buildings in Glasgow/3
