= Charles Wilson (Scottish architect) =

Scottish architect (1810–1863)

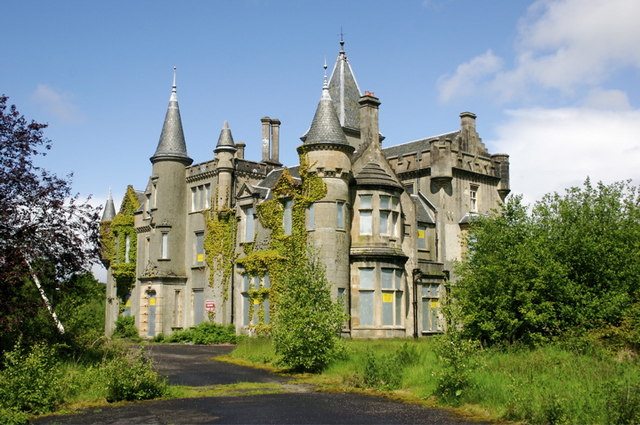
Shandon House, Shandon (1849)

Charles Wilson (19 June 1810 – 5 February 1863) was a Scottish architect from Glasgow.

== Biography ==
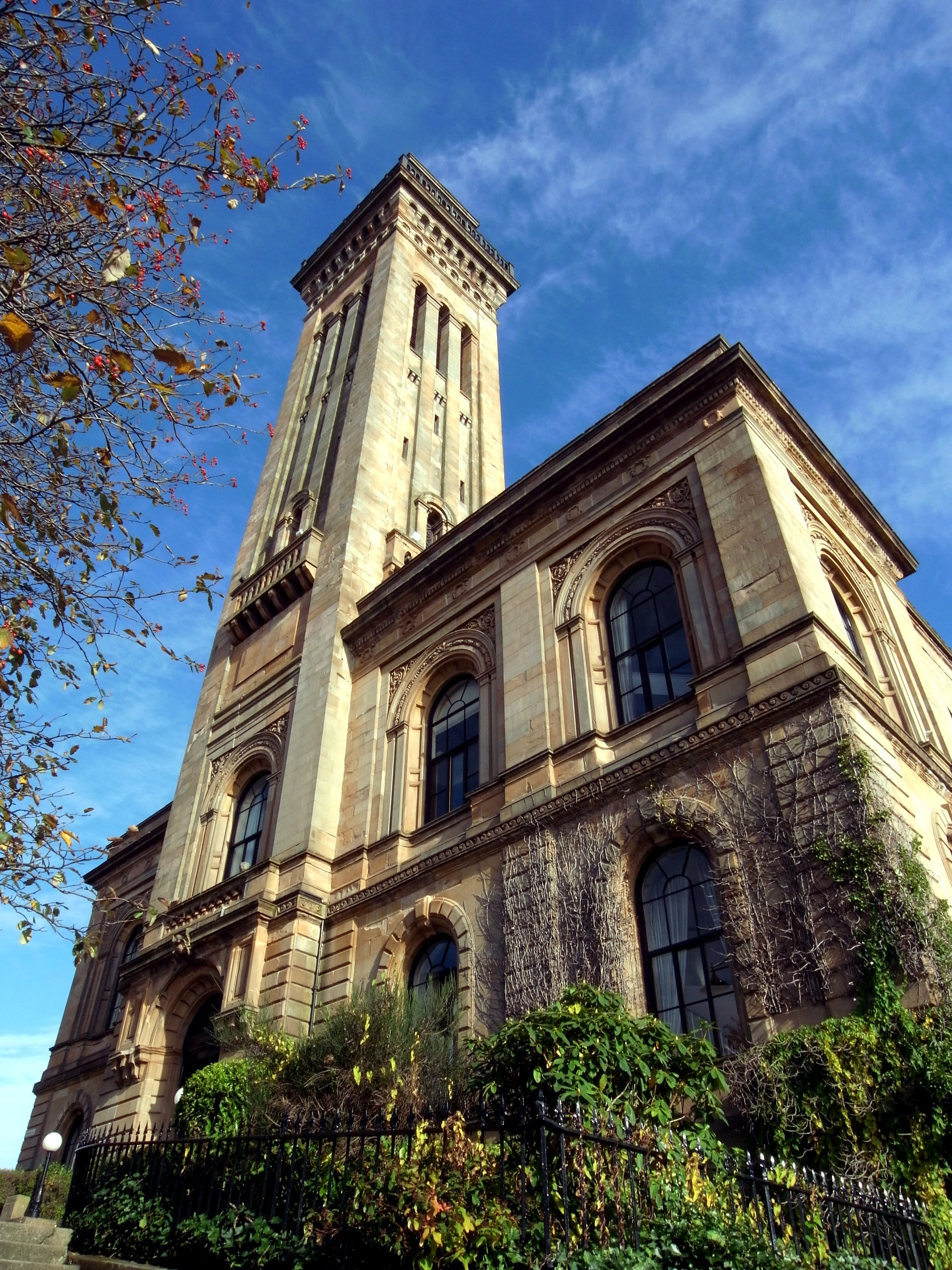
Glasgow. Former Trinity College (1856-1857). 31 Lynedoch Street

Charles Wilson was the younger son of a Glasgow-based master mason and builder. After working for his father, he was articled to the architect David Hamilton in 1827. In Hamilton's office, Wilson worked on jobs including Hamilton Palace, the Glasgow Royal Exchange, Castle Toward and Lennox Castle.

Wilson left Hamilton's practice in 1837 to take over his father's business, together with his elder brother John. This partnership only lasted for two years, after which Charles Wilson established his own architecture practice. His early work was influenced by the architectural style of his former employer, including Italianate and Greek revival buildings. Due to financial problems at David Hamilton's firm, which was sequestrated in 1844, Wilson gained work that might have been expected to go to Hamilton, including the commission for the City Lunatic Asylum at Gartnavel in 1840. In preparation for this project, Wilson travelled to asylums in England and France.

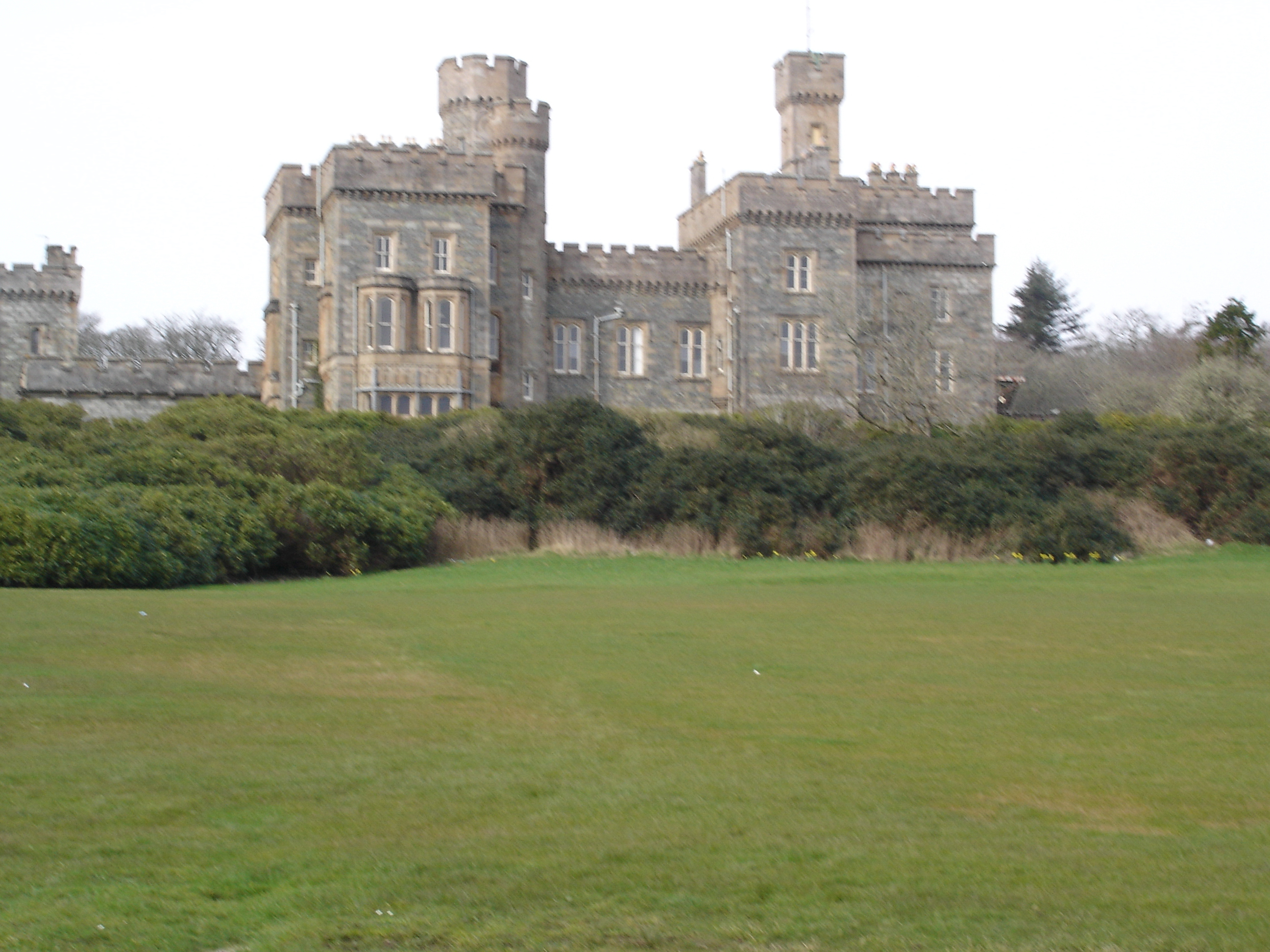
Lews Castle, Stornoway (1847–1857)

Continental neoclassicism increasingly influenced his work during the 1840s and 1850s, although he also produced work in the Scots Baronial style. During this period he worked on numerous residential villas, and several public buildings including the Queens Rooms (1856) and the Free Church College (1856–1857), both in Glasgow. In 1850, he designed Woodside House in Paisley for the thread baron, Sir Peter Coats. He was responsible for the Duke Street Cotton Mill and the Neilson Institute in Paisley (both 1849). In 1851 Wilson prepared a master plan for the Park district of Glasgow, the core of which was taken forward as Park Circus, although other parts of his scheme were not adopted. He also assisted Sir Joseph Paxton with the layout for the adjacent Kelvingrove Park. Wilson's design for 22 Park Circus was executed after his death. His important mansions include the castellated Lews Castle, Stornoway (1847–1857), for Sir James Matheson.

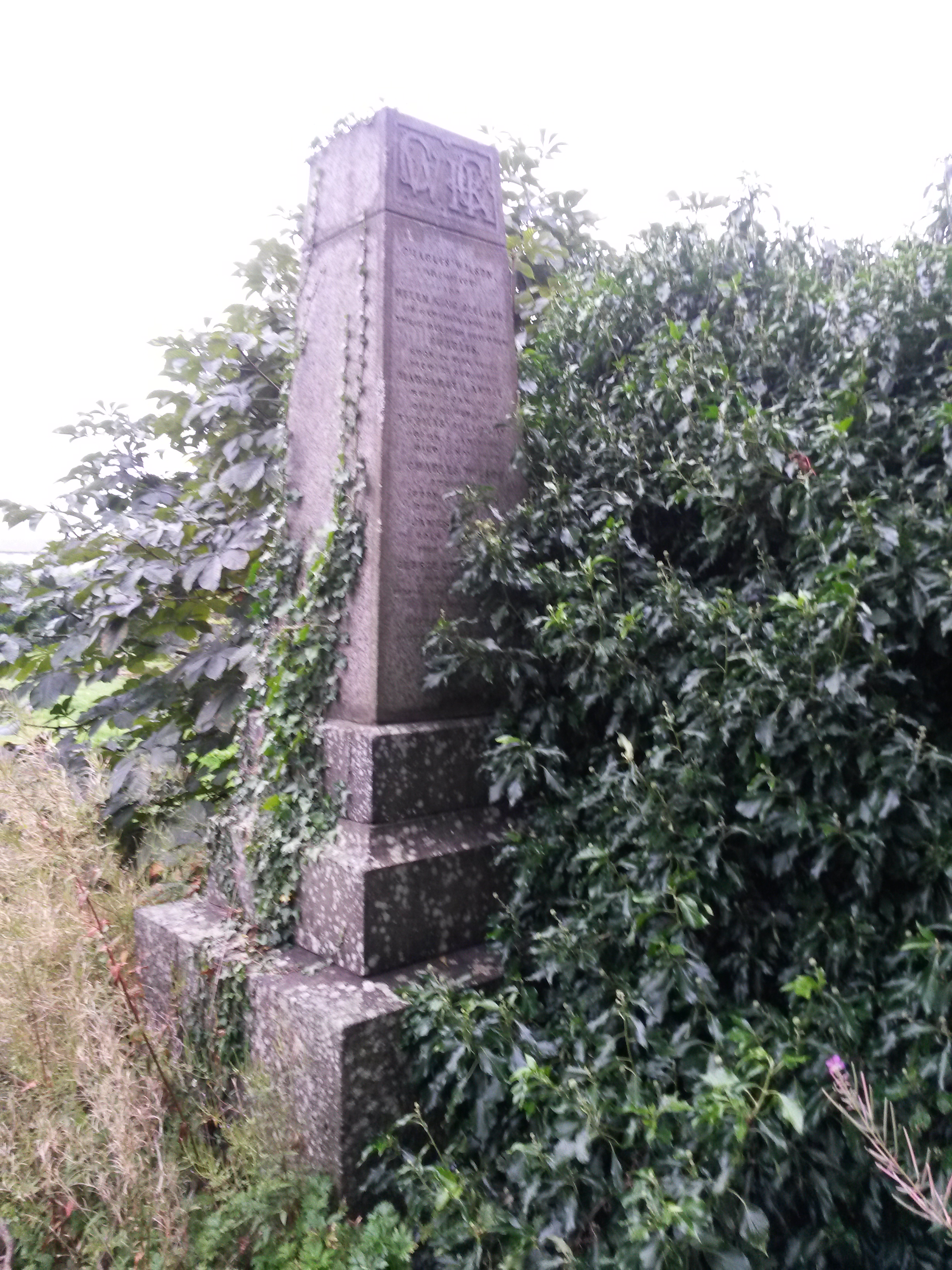
Wilson's tomb at the Southern Necropolis in Glasgow

Wilson was a founder-member of the Architectural Institute of Scotland in 1850, and of the Glasgow Architectural Society in 1858, of which he became president in 1860, although due to failing health he was succeeded as president by Alexander Thomson the following year. Wilson's former assistant, David Thomson, returned to his firm as a partner shortly after, taking on the running of the practice. In February 1863 Charles Wilson died of dropsy, and was buried in Glasgow's Southern Necropolis, close to the gateway he had designed in 1848. Besides David Thomson, architects trained in Wilson's practice include Thomas Ross, James Boucher and James Cousland.

== Mentions in literature and pop culture ==
A House designed by Charles Wilson plays an important part in the "Empathy is the Enemy" storyline of the comic-book series Hellblazer.
