= Kelvingrove, Glasgow =

Coordinates: 55.866133°N 4.283775°W

Kelvingrove
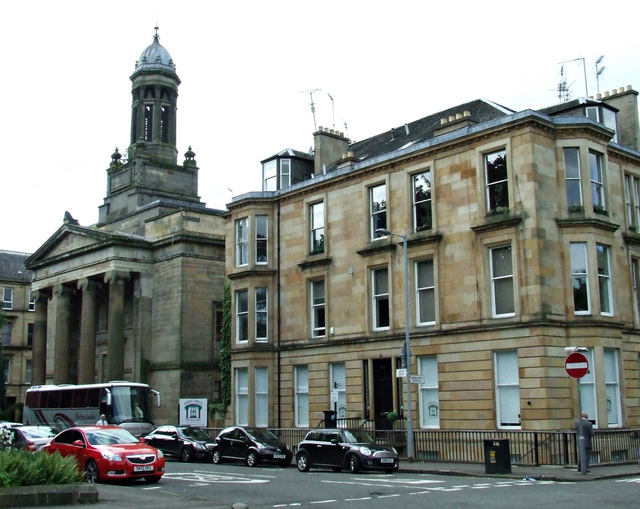
- Converted church on Derby Street

- Location within Glasgow
- OS grid reference: NS571660
- Council area: Glasgow City Council
- Lieutenancy area: Glasgow
- Country: Scotland
- Sovereign state: United Kingdom
- Post town: GLASGOW
- Postcode district: G3 7
- Dialling code: 0141
- Police: Scotland
- Fire: Scottish
- Ambulance: Scottish
- UK Parliament: Glasgow North
- Scottish Parliament: Glasgow Kelvin

Kelvingrove is a neighbourhood in the city of Glasgow, Scotland. It is situated north of the River Clyde in the West End of the city, and directly borders Kelvingrove Park to the north and the grounds of the Kelvingrove Art Gallery and Museum to the west. Its other boundaries are not precisely defined, but roughly correspond to Sauchiehall Street to the south opposite the Sandyford neighbourhood, and the Charing Cross area to the east.

== Description ==
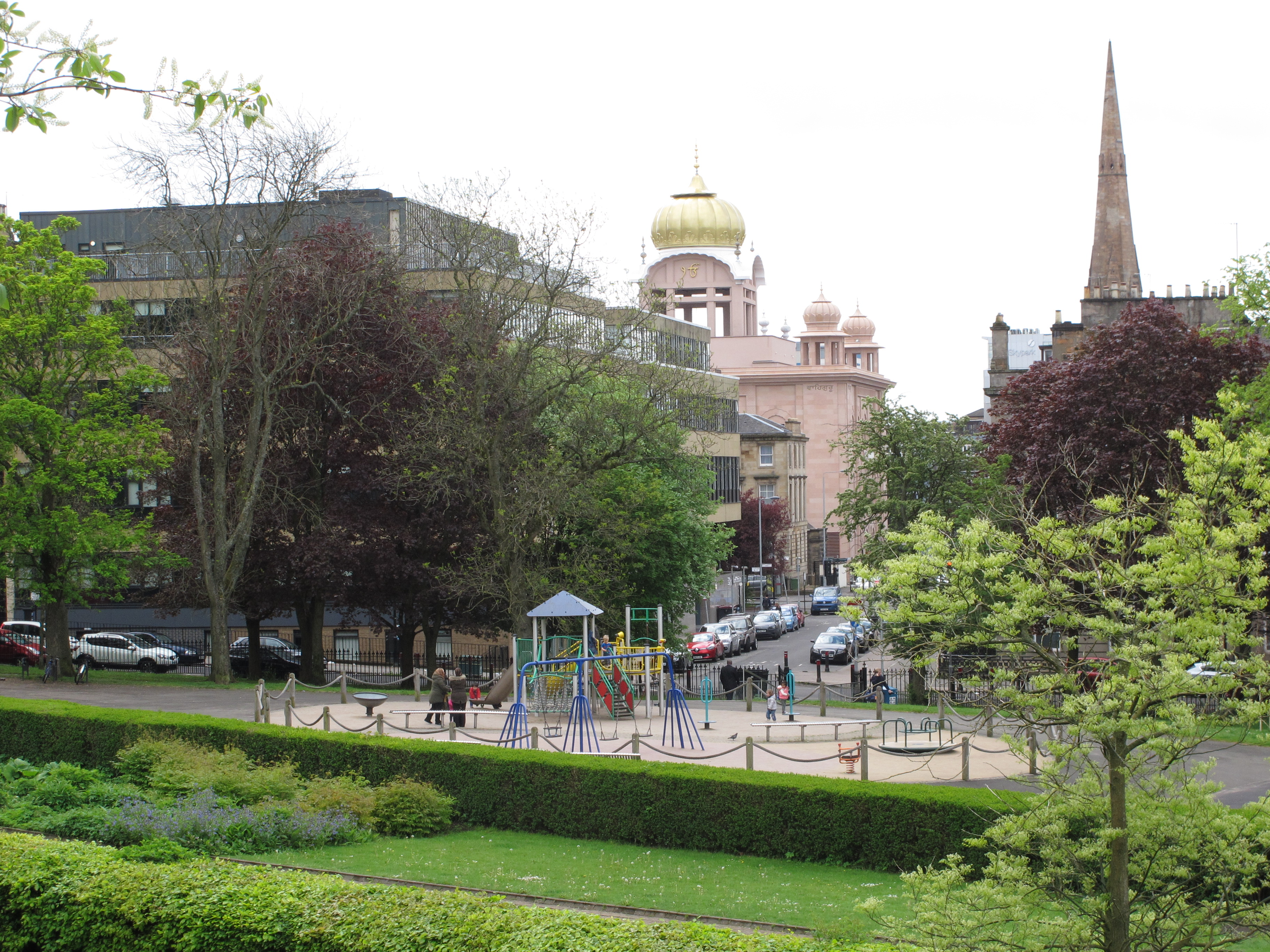
Overlooking play area at west corner of Kelvingrove Park, with Gurdwara in background

Along with Charing Cross and the Park District a short distance to the north, Kelvingrove forms part of the 'Park' conservation area, one of 25 such zones covered by Glasgow City Council. Many of its townhouses and tenements, dating from the mid to late 19th century, are listed buildings.

There were also church buildings closer to the park, one of which at North Claremont Street was demolished in the 1960s and the site is now occupied by one of the few purpose-built office buildings in the area; its congregation moved to the other local church at Derby Street, but that was converted into apartments in the late 1970s, with the congregation being absorbed by Anderston Church. The open area of grass and trees adjacent to the Derby Street building was once occupied by Kelvingrove UP Church, which was demolished after a fire in 1920.

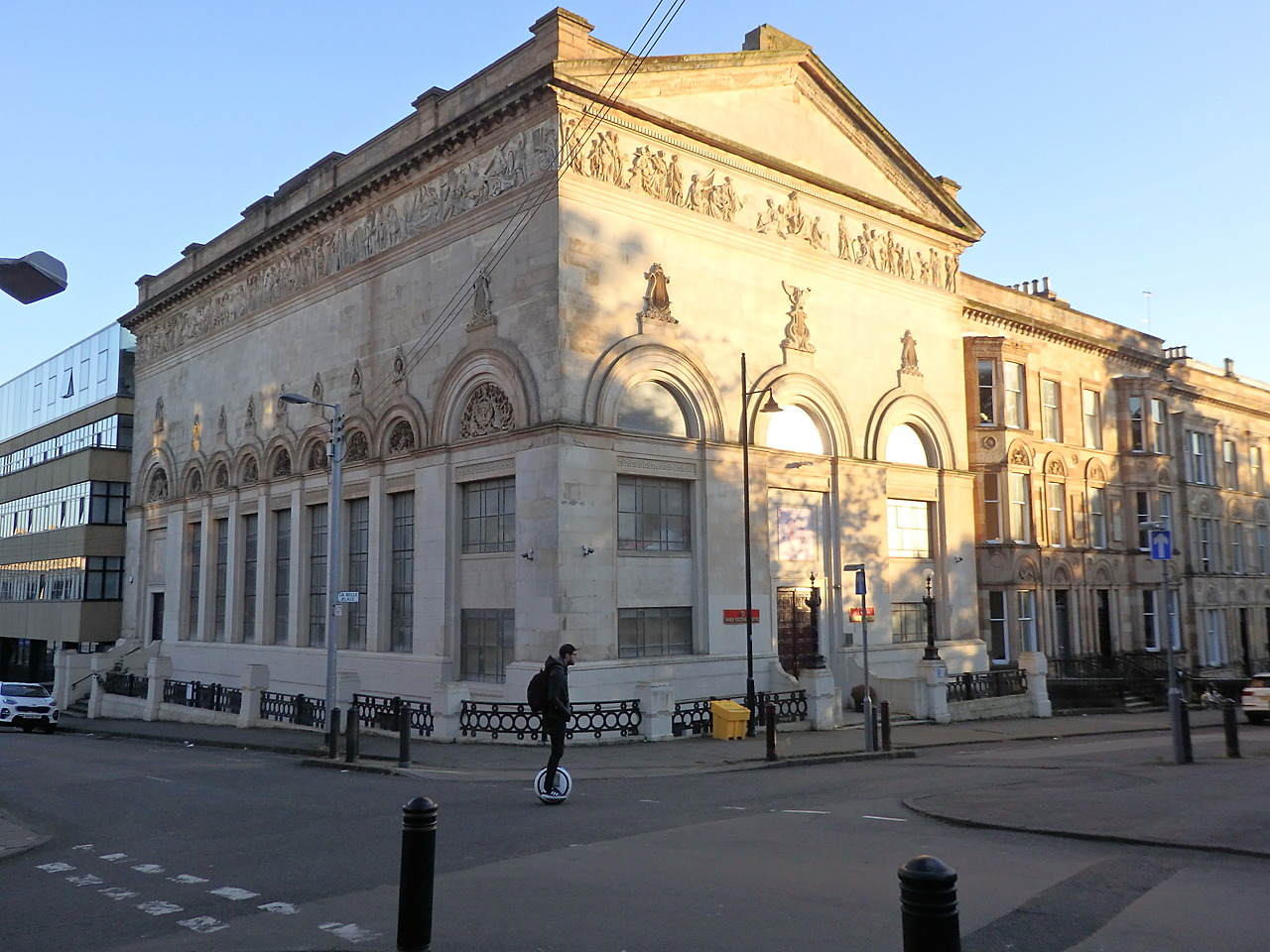
Hindu Mandir, La Belle Place

The nearby Queens's Rooms building at La Belle Place also served as a Christian Science Church from the 1940s before becoming a Hindu temple in 2006, the largest such facility in Scotland. The building was designed in the 1850s by Charles Wilson who was also responsible for two adjacent blonde sandstone tenements featuring ornate carvings dating from the same time.

Owing to its location between the tourist areas of Glasgow city centre, the West End (centred on Byres Road) and the entertainment venues at the SEC Centre, the neighbourhood has a large number of hotels among its tenements, most on the main thoroughfare, Sauchiehall Street adjoining Sandyford. There are also several established restaurants and bars, a provision which increased markedly in the 2010s as the wider area (usually marketed as Finnieston) around Argyle Street became more popular as a destination in its own right.

The sections of Kelvingrove Park closest to the residential area include a skatepark, two children's play areas and the Kelvingrove Lawn Bowls Centre which also features public-use tennis courts.
