= Bellgrove Hotel =

Category B listed building in Glasgow

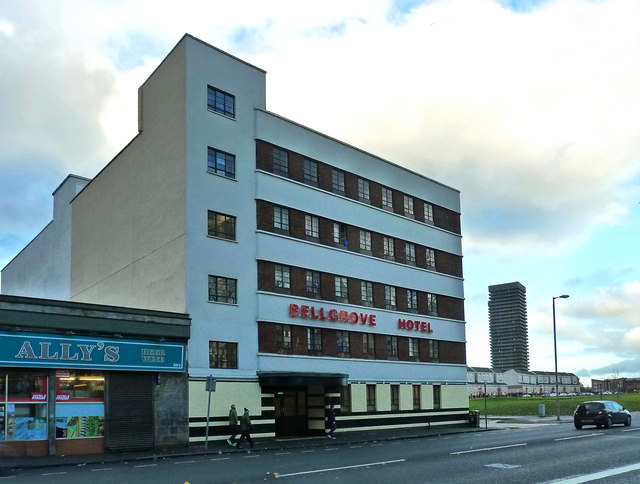
- Bellgrove Hotel, Glasgow

General information
- Architectural style: Moderne architecture
- Location: 607 Gallowgate, Glasgow
- Coordinates: 55°51′18″N 4°13′19″W

Design and construction
- Architecture firm: C J McNair & Elder

The Bellgrove Hotel is a category B listed building in the Gallowgate area of Glasgow.

== Building and listed status ==
The address of the building is 607 Gallowgate, Glasgow. The building as it stands now was built in the 1930s to plans drawn up by C J McNair & Elder. The building was created as a hotel for working men. As late as the 1970s the building was still in use for this purpose, and it was a strict requirement of occupancy that the men held a job.

The hotel is considered to be a striking example of art deco, 1930s Moderne architecture. The building was category B listed on 3 August 2004.

== Change of use ==
In recent years, the demand for working men's accommodation decreased and the hotel was brought into different use. In 2000 it was reported that the majority of occupants were now unemployed, and more than 90 per cent had alcohol problems. This article in the Glasgow Herald highlighted the role of the hostel as a "last chance saloon" for people for whom the council could not find suitable accommodation. At that time the hostel employed a care worker and assistance was offered to residents for problems with health, alcohol dependency, and housing.

In 2000 the social justice minister for Scotland, Jackie Baillie, announced that £12M had been allocated to help replace Glasgow's homeless hostels with new smaller-scale supported accommodation which would better assist those with health, drug, or alcohol problems. Baillie said in parliament that "It's clear that Glasgow's old, out of date hostels are part of the homelessness problem and not part of the solution." This announcement followed the recommendations of a Glasgow Review Team report on street homelessness. The members of the team included Glasgow City Council, Greater Glasgow Health Board, Glasgow Council for Single Homeless, The Big Issue, and Strathclyde Police.

In 2012, the Glasgow Evening Times reported that the MSP John Mason was calling for tighter regulation at the Bellgrove to ensure the welfare of the vulnerable residents. He highlighted the fact that the facility was not subject to care regulations, and was licensed as a private hotel. This does not fall within the oversight of the Care Inspectorate, local authorities or the Housing Regulator.

== 2000 BBC Frontline Scotland investigation ==
The hostel was described as the worst in Scotland by a BBC Frontline Scotland investigation in 2000. The BBC reported that £500k each year was paid to the privately run homeless hostel by the government, but there were serious concerns about the welfare and supervision of residents.

The management of the hotel denied allegations that the hostel was used as a "dumping ground" and responded that they had spent £400k over 4 years to achieve the standard of accommodation necessary to qualify for a multiple occupancy licence.

== Tripadvisor incident ==
In April 2013, it was reported that the hotel was listed on the Tripadvisor website's top 100 UK hotels due to a campaign of prank reviews. The fictional reviews mentioned a range of non-existent facilities including marble floors, crystal chandeliers, swimming pools, and spa.

== 2014 Daily Record/Daily Mirror/GMB undercover investigation ==
Conditions at the hotel were publicised following an undercover investigation carried out jointly by the Daily Record, the Daily Mirror, and the GMB in February 2014.

The Daily Record pointed out that social justice minister Jackie Baillie had promised to close Glasgow's homeless hostel on the recommendation of the review team in 2000, but that 14 years later this had never happened to the Bellgrove which was still open.

The conditions in the hostel were described by the Daily Record as "comparable to the poverty George Orwell encountered on the road to Wigan Pier in the 1930s", and were variously described as prison-like, "rat-infested", and "squalid".

The Daily Record further criticised the owners of the hostel who had bought it for £65k in 1988, and as of 2014, were receiving more than £1.5M of taxpayer's money in housing benefit payments each year.

Glasgow City Councillor Gordon Matheson, writing in the Daily Record, claimed in February 2014, that the council had stopped referring homeless people to the Bellgrove in 2010, and he called for more funding to improve the provision of housing for the homeless in the city. Since Caseworkers have gone on strike in Glasgow, many homeless single men have been "advised" that there are rooms available in the Bellgrove Hotel when presenting at the Hamish Allen Centre, and have been given Taxi Transport to take them to the Hotel, so Councillor Matheson's statement no longer stands ground.

== 2014 Government/Council actions ==
Following the publication of the investigation in February 2014, the Scottish Government announced that they would look into the matter. Margaret Burgess, Minister for Housing and Welfare, announced that she was writing to Glasgow City Council. It was also announced that the Care Inspectorate were visiting the premises to assess whether regulatory standards could be required of the hostel, but that the owners were meeting social workers with a "less than accommodating approach".

The Housing Minister met with the leader of Glasgow City Council in March 2014, to discuss the future of the hostel. The council were asked to come up with a plan to address the concerns raised in the investigation.

In October 2014, it was reported that Glasgow City Council had refused to grant a three-year extension to the hostel's multiple occupancy (HMO) licence. Instead, a one-year extension was offered with any further extension being made conditional upon significant improvement works being carried out to increase the number of bathrooms and toilets, and to improve the condition of bedrooms.

== Scottish Parliamentary debate ==
In December 2014, the question of stronger regulation for housing was debated in the Scottish Parliament, led by the MSP for Shettleston, John Mason. He said that the hostel "has conditions that, generously, could be considered unsuitable, and less generously, grim, Dickensian, like a Soviet gulag or similar such descriptions." The debate highlighted the lack of regulation of the provision of temporary accommodation for homeless people. The hotel was noted to receive around £1.5 million in housing benefit payments each year from the Scottish Government and provides lodgings for around 140 people.
