= Finnieston railway station =

Former railway station in Scotland

Finnieston
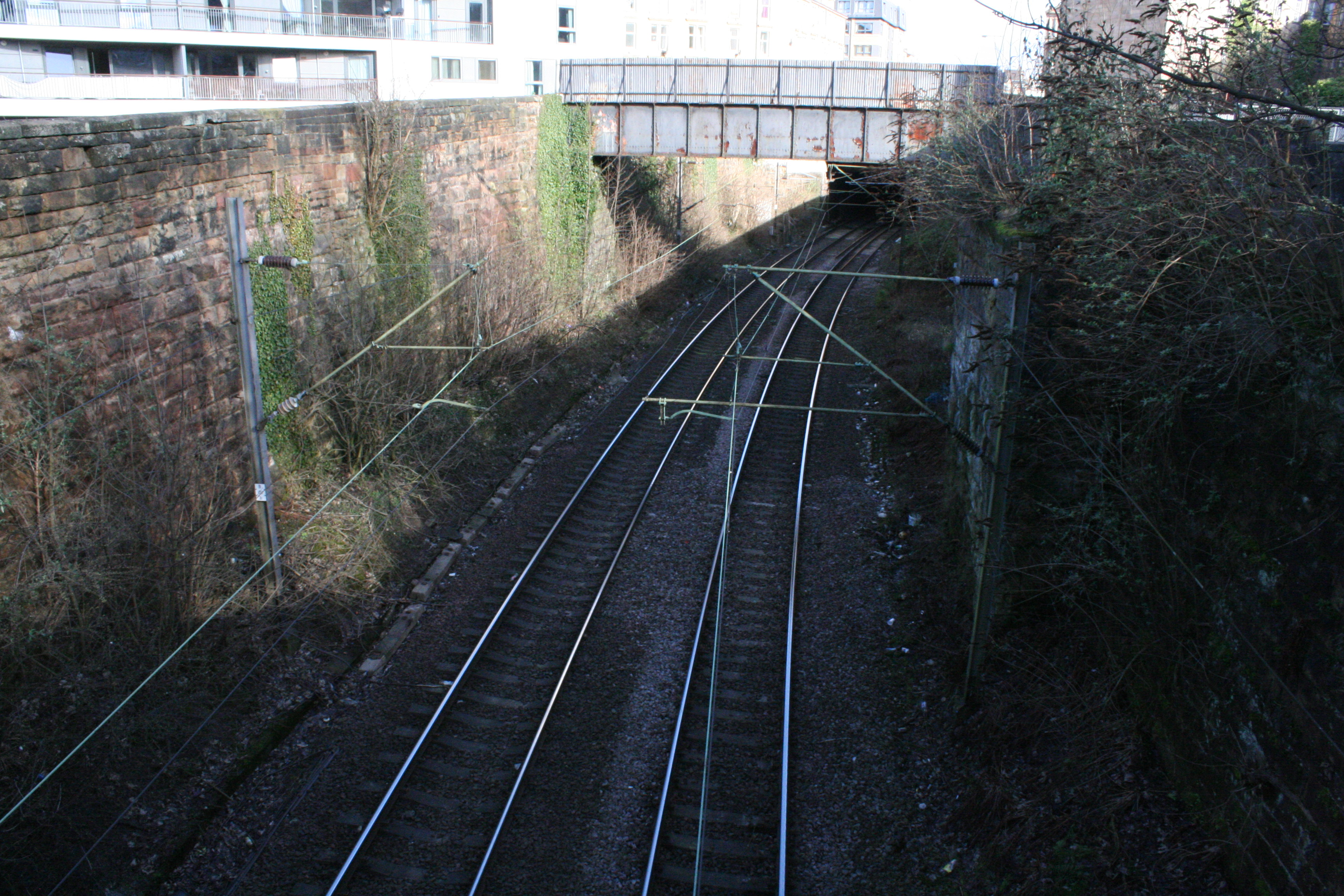
- Site of Finnieston railway station at the west end of Finnieston Tunnel in 2011.

General information
- Location: Finnieston, Glasgow; Scotland
- Coordinates: 55.8640°N 4.2828°W
- Platforms: 2

Other information
- Status: Disused

History
- Original company: Glasgow City and District Railway
- Pre-grouping: North British Railway

Key dates
- 13 March 1886: Opened
- 1 January 1917: Closed
Location

Finnieston railway station was located in Glasgow, Scotland and served the Finnieston area of that city. On the Glasgow City and District Railway it was located on the modern North Clyde line close to where it emerges from west end of Finnieston Tunnel from Charing Cross near Argyle Street and Finnieston Street.

In June 2018, it was revealed that the local community council was considering reopening the station. In September 2021, when asked by Labour MSP Paul Sweeney, Transport Minister Graeme Dey said the reopening was considered within the Strategic Transport Projects Review 2 but no commitment for reopening had been made yet.

Preceding station	Historical railways	Following station
Charing Cross; Line and station open	Glasgow City and District Railway; North British Railway	Partickhill; Line open; Station closed
