= 22 Park Circus, Glasgow =

Townhouse in Glasgow, Scotland

Coordinates: 55°52′10″N 4°16′47″W

22 Park Circus
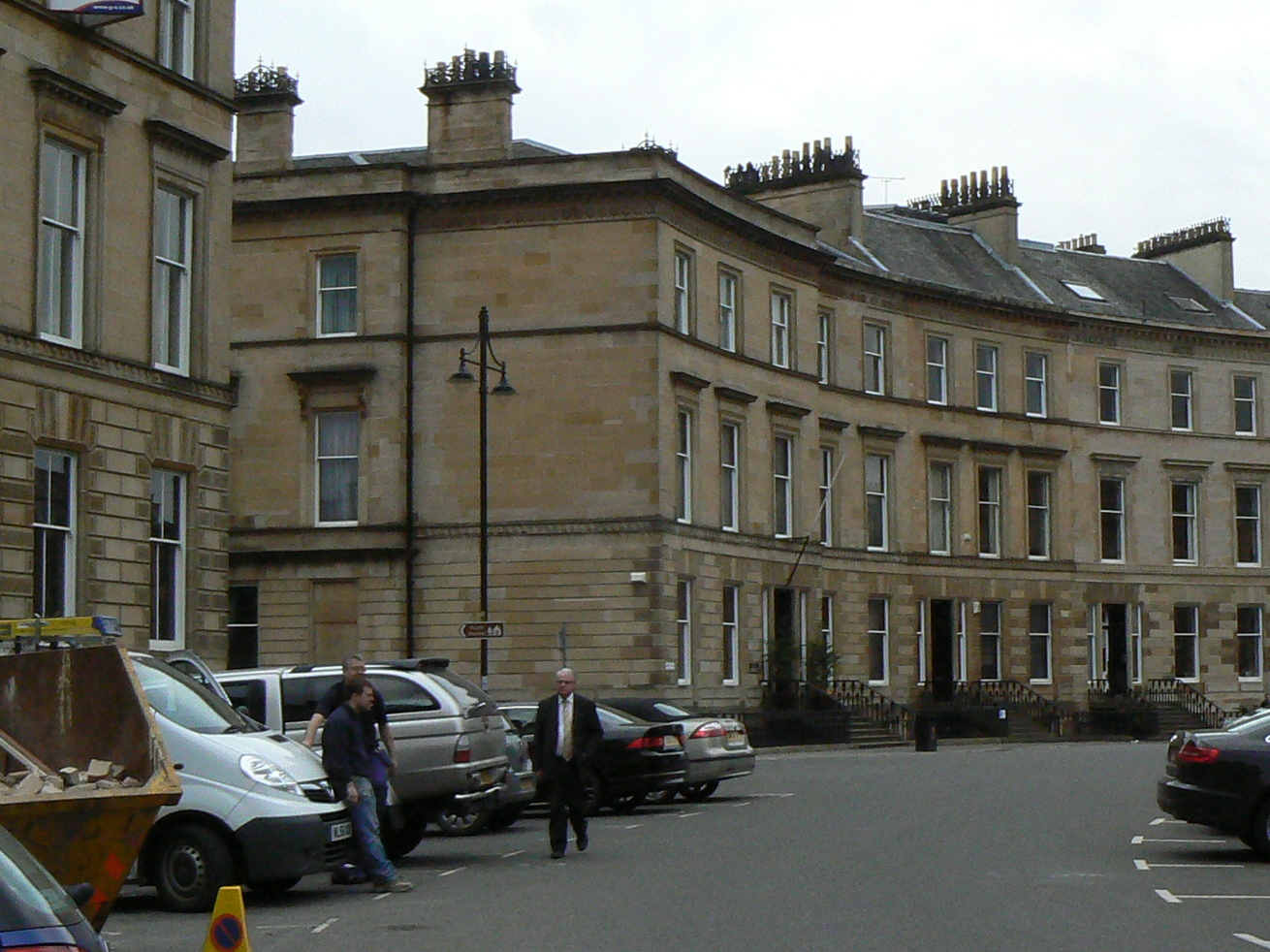
- View of Park Circus featuring No 22 (with side visible)
- Interactive map of the 22 Park Circus area
- Former names: Casa D'Italia

General information
- Type: Townhouse
- Location: Glasgow, 22 Park Circus
- Construction started: 1872
- Completed: 1874

Technical details
- Floor count: 4

Design and construction
- Architect: Charles Wilson
- Main contractor: James Boucher

22 Park Circus is a 19th-century townhouse in the West End of Glasgow, Scotland. Originally a family home, it was later a club and an Italian consulate. From 1994 to 2013 the building housed the city's register office.

== Construction ==
The house forms part of Park Circus, the focal point of the high-end area known as the Park district of the West End of the city. Built to the designs of architect Charles Wilson in the mid-nineteenth century, the area sits atop Woodlands Hill and is named for its proximity to Kelvingrove Park, which it overlooks. Park Circus itself sits on the very top of the hill and is split into four curved terraces around a private garden, and Number 22 sits at the end of the southwest terrace, on the corner with Park Street South. Although Park Circus was constructed between 1857 and 1858, work on Number 22 did not begin until 1872, completed in 1874.

== History ==
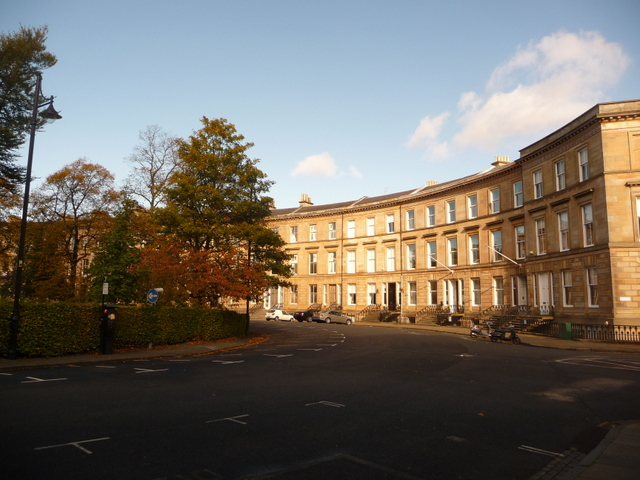
Park Circus

The house was originally built for Walter Macfarlane, a wealthy Glasgow industrialist and founder of the Saracen Foundry. After his death in 1885, the house was taken over by his nephew, Walter Macfarlane II, who employed Glasgow style architects James Salmon and J Gaff Gillespie to modernise the building. Their refurbishments, between 1897 and 1899, included a cast iron conservatory, as well as an Art Nouveau billiards room with glass-domed anteroom. Macfarlane also employed noted sculptors Francis Derwent Wood, Albert Hodge and Johan Keller to make wood carvings for the house, including the new front door.

In 1934, the building was acquired as an Italian social club, known as Casa D'Italia, and after the Second World War was used as a regional Italian consulate. In 1990, the building was acquired by developers, who, in co-operation with Historic Scotland, began a programme of restoration. The renovation work undertaken by the owners meant that all rooms retained their period features, including fireplaces.

In 1994 it was leased to Glasgow City Council, which operated the building as the city's register office for civil marriages. 22 Park Circus was opened as Marriage Suites by James Robison JP. The building offered five marriage suites:

- The Lomond Suite occupied the former Library, overlooking Park Circus and seated fifty-five guests.
- The Kelvin Suite was situated in the former Dining Room, and seated fifty-five guests.
- The Avon Room was located in the conservatory, and seated twenty guests
- The Katrine Suite was in the first floor Drawing Room of the house, and seated fifty-five guests.
- The Clyde Suite was in the former Master Bedroom, and had room for thirty guests.

Behind the conservatory is the former Victorian Turkish bath, where private ceremonies were held without guests.

In July 2013 the council's lease expired and the register office closed.

Together with the rest of Park Circus, no.22 has been protected as a category A listed building since 1970.
