= Park District, Glasgow =

Coordinates: 55.8687°N 4.2804°W

Park District: Scots: Pairk Destrict
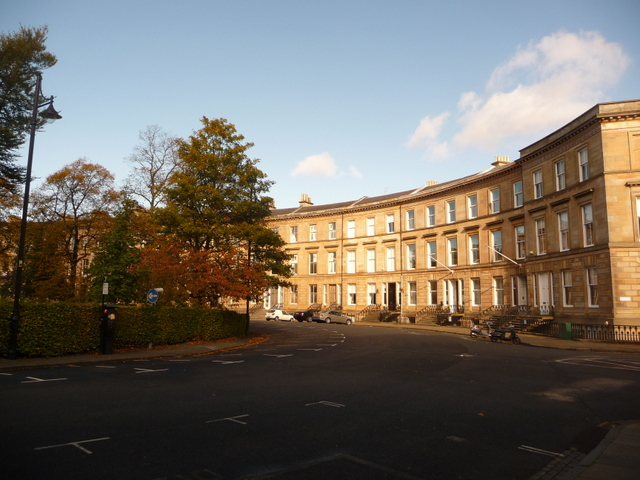
- North side of Park Circus

- Location within the Glasgow City council area Location within Scotland
- OS grid reference: NS574663
- Council area: Glasgow City
- Lieutenancy area: Glasgow
- Country: Scotland
- Sovereign state: United Kingdom
- Post town: GLASGOW
- Postcode district: G3
- Dialling code: 0141
- Police: Scotland
- Fire: Scottish
- Ambulance: Scottish
- UK Parliament: Glasgow Central
- Scottish Parliament: Glasgow Kelvin

The Park District of the West End of Glasgow, Scotland, is an affluent area located around Park Circus, which sits atop Woodlands Hill, beside Kelvingrove Park.

== Overview ==
The Park District area is bordered by the City Centre, Kelvingrove, Kelvingrove Park and Woodlands. Park Circus was built between 1855 and 1863. Many of the area's large townhouses that were converted to offices during the latter half of the 20th century are being returned to residential use. It was declared a Conservation Area in 1970.

Prior to 2013, the Glasgow City Council's civil marriage rooms were located at 22 Park Circus, in the former Italian consulate. The Scottish Football Association (SFA) had its headquarters on Park Gardens in the area, but moved to Hampden Park when the stadium was redeveloped and also became a home for the organisation. A mosaic depicting the badge of the SFA still exists at the entrance to their former headquarters. The Scottish Labour Party formerly had its headquarters in the area; the towers that once formed the University of Glasgow's Trinity College are located on Lynedoch Place and dominate the local skyline, although classes ceased in the early 1970s and the building was converted to apartments in the 1980s, in contrast to the neighbouring Park Church, of which only the distinctive white tower remains, with the church itself replaced by offices in the late 1960s when that function was in demand in the area. As for other organisations, the offices of The Royal Society for the Protection of Birds, The Scottish Council for Development and Industry, The Scottish Catholic International Aid Fund and The Goethe Institute are located here.

== Park Circus ==
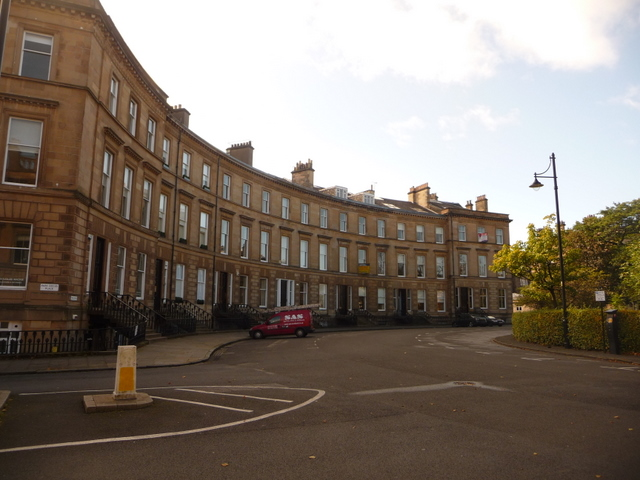
South side of Park Circus.

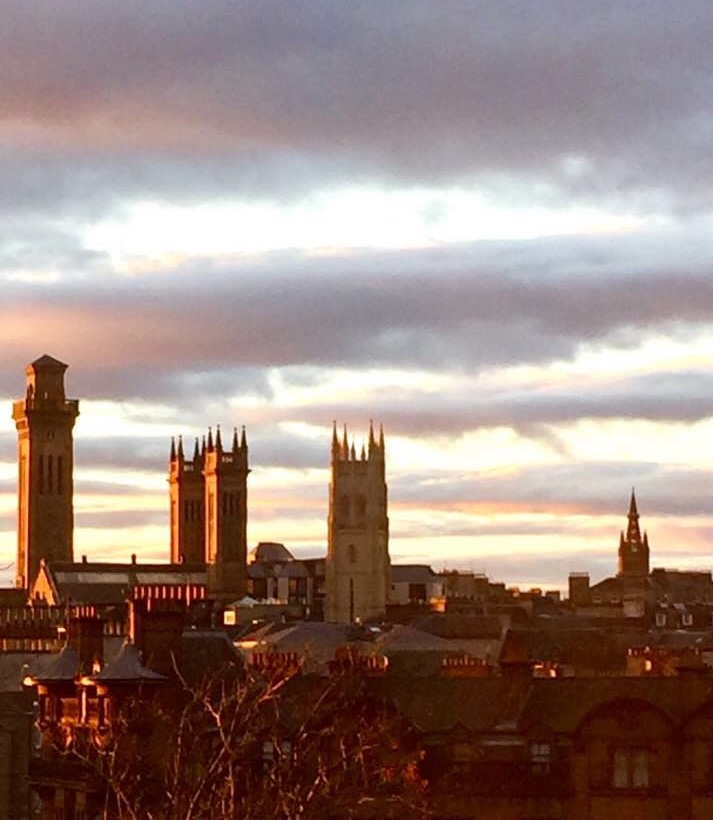
Park district skyline

Park Circus forms a centrepiece of the Park District. It has two gently curving crescents of large 19th-century townhouses, including 22 Park Circus, and an oval garden in the centre.

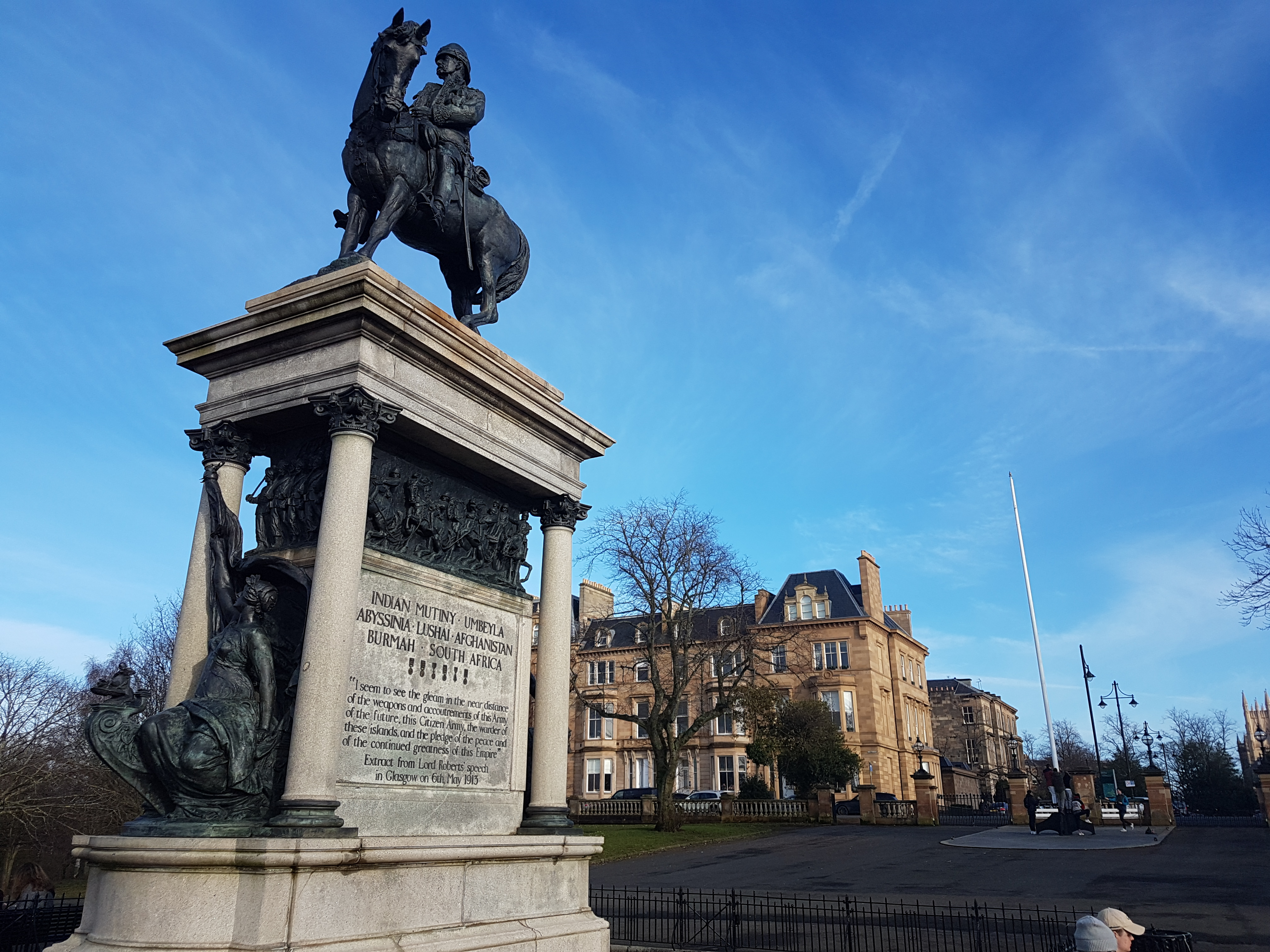
Lord Frederick Sleigh Roberts Monument at Kelvingrove Park

== Maclay Hall ==
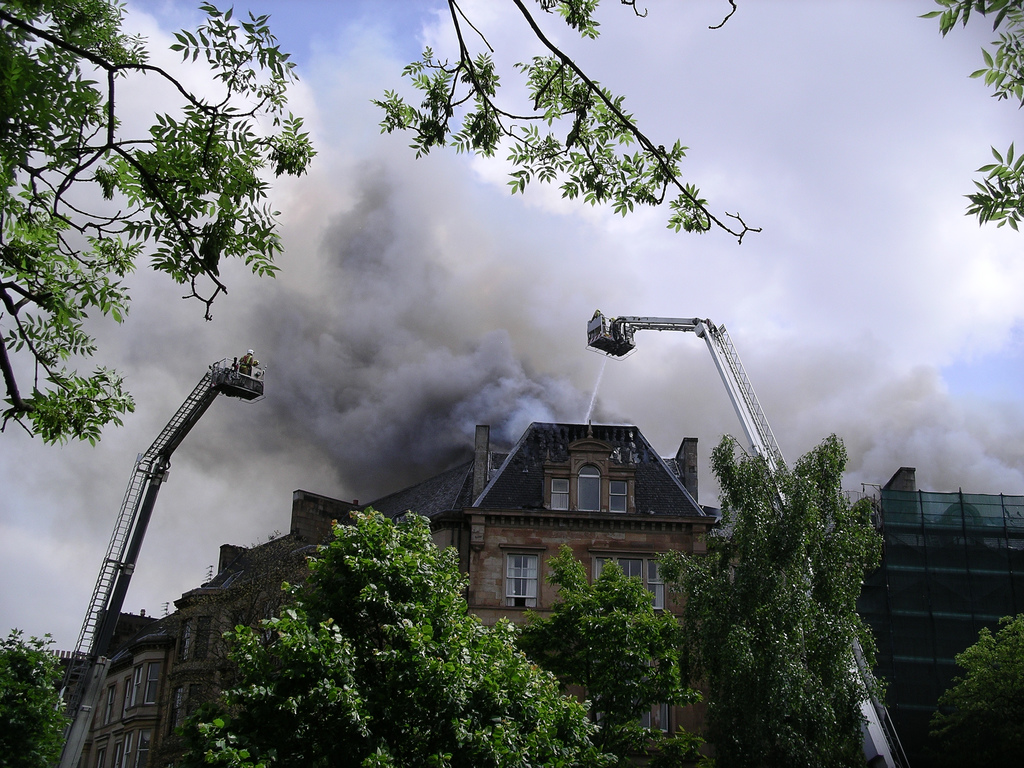
Maclay Hall Fire, June 2006.

The University of Glasgow had a hall of residence on Park Terrace, known as Maclay Hall. It was donated to the university by Lord and Lady Maclay in 1921 in memory of their two sons who fell during the First World War. The hall was sold for private development in 2004. The development suffered a setback on 13 June 2006, when fire swept through House 18 and the surrounding terrace.

== Situation ==
University of Glasgow and Kelvingrove Art Gallery and Museum are approximately 8 minutes of walking away from Park District. Nearby public transport includes Kelvinbridge subway station and Charing Cross (Glasgow) railway station.
