= Gladstone House =

Gladstone House may refer to the following places:

- Gladstone House and Cottage in Australia
- Gladstone Hotel (Toronto) in Canada, also called the Gladstone House
- Gladstone Houses in the United States
- Gladstone House in Yetholm, UK; see List of listed buildings in Yetholm, Scottish Borders, Scotland
- Gladstone House in Glasgow, UK; see List of listed buildings in Glasgow/9, Scotland

== See also ==
- Gladstone (disambiguation)
- House (disambiguation)
