= List of listed buildings in Glasgow/1 =

This is a list of listed buildings in Glasgow, Scotland.

== List ==
| Name | Location | Date Listed | Grid Ref. (Note: Sometimes known as OSGB36, the grid reference (where provided) is based on the British national grid reference system used by the Ordnance Survey. • "Guide to National Grid". Ordnance Survey. • "Get-a-map". Ordnance Survey.) | Geo-coordinates | Notes | LB Number (Note: Historic Environment Scotland assign a unique alphanumeric identifier to each designated site in Scotland, for listed buildings this always begins with "LB", for example "LB12345".) | Image |
|---|---|---|---|---|---|---|---|
| 10-28 (Even Nos) Cleveden Gardens With Boundary Walls, Gatepiers To Road And Gatepiers Flanking Entrances | | | | 55°53′03″N 4°17′58″W | Category B | 44654 | Upload Photo |
| 2-12A (Inclusive Nos) Princes Terrace, Prince Albert Road, With Gatepiers And Railings To Princes Terrace Lane | | | | 55°52′37″N 4°18′06″W | Category B | 44595 | Upload another image |
| 315-349 (Odd Nos) Sauchiehall Street, 148, 150 Holland Street | | | | 55°51′56″N 4°15′55″W | Category B | 43904 | Upload Photo |
| 20 Dykebar Avenue And 17 Foxbar Drive, Knightswood Community Youth Centre | | | | 55°53′20″N 4°21′26″W | Category C(S) | 43117 | Upload Photo |
| 42 Lincoln Avenue, Corpus Christi Roman Catholic Church And Presbytery With Railings And Boundary Wall | | | | 55°53′13″N 4°21′03″W | Category C(S) | 43118 | Upload Photo |
| 833-861 (Odd Nos) Crow Road, Anniesland Court | | | | 55°53′27″N 4°19′31″W | Category A | 43034 | Upload another image |
| 206 Knightswood Road, Knightswood Cross, St Ninian's Roman Catholic Church And Church Hall With Boundary Walls, Gates And Gatepiers | | | | 55°53′43″N 4°20′27″W | Category B | 43038 | Upload another image |
| 212, 214 Newlands Road, Former New Cathcart Church Including Hall, Piers And Railings | | | | 55°49′04″N 4°15′52″W | Category B | 33950 | Upload Photo |
| Pleasance Street, Greenview Street, Clock Tower | | | | 55°49′32″N 4°17′39″W | Category B | 33951 | Upload Photo |
| 1039 Pollokshaws Road, Corona Bar | | | | 55°49′53″N 4°16′44″W | Category C(S) | 33952 | Upload Photo |
| Shawhill Road, St Mary Immaculate Rc Church And Presbytery | | | | 55°49′34″N 4°17′32″W | Category B | 33965 | Upload Photo |
| 42 Spean Street, Scottish Power Building Including Access Bridge | | | | 55°49′16″N 4°15′58″W | Category B | 33967 | Upload Photo |
| 6-76 (Even Nos) Springhill Gardens And 912-924 (Even Nos) Pollokshaws Road | | | | 55°50′00″N 4°16′35″W | Category C(S) | 33968 | Upload Photo |
| 200 Thornliebank Road, Eastwood Cemetery | | | | 55°48′46″N 4°18′39″W | Category B | 33969 | Upload Photo |
| 107-141 (Odd Nos) Saltmarket And 3-7 (Odd Nos) Steel Street | | | | 55°51′17″N 4°14′43″W | Category B | 33972 | Upload another image |
| 9 Armadale Street And Roselea Drive, Dennistoun Central Church Of Scotland | | | | 55°51′32″N 4°13′01″W | Category B | 33885 | Upload Photo |
| 6 Broompark Circus Including Gatepiers | | | | 55°51′45″N 4°13′23″W | Category B | 33887 | Upload Photo |
| 23-49 (Odd Nos) Broompark Drive | | | | 55°51′41″N 4°13′21″W | Category B | 33889 | Upload another image |
| 2A Craigpark, Dennistoun Library | | | | 55°51′33″N 4°13′17″W | Category B | 33893 | Upload another image |
| 1-12 (Inclusive Numbers) Seton Terrace | | | | 55°51′33″N 4°13′22″W | Category C(S) | 33905 | Upload Photo |
| 23 Westercraigs Including Boundary Wall And Piers | | | | 55°51′36″N 4°13′26″W | Category C(S) | 33908 | Upload Photo |
| 380 Clarkston Road, Former Toledo Cinema | | | | 55°48′35″N 4°16′20″W | Category B | 33920 | Upload another image |
| 64, 66, 68 Greenview Street | | | | 55°49′37″N 4°17′43″W | Category C(S) | 33923 | Upload Photo |
| 2 Langside Drive, 37 Riverside Road, Newlands South Church And Hall | | | | 55°49′20″N 4°16′43″W | Category B | 33934 | Upload another image |
| 14 Langside Drive And Corrour Road, Towerdene Including Gatepiers And Perimeter Walls | | | | 55°49′15″N 4°16′42″W | Category B | 33935 | Upload Photo |
| 52-54 (Even Nos) Langside Drive | | | | 55°48′55″N 4°16′43″W | Category A | 33936 | Upload Photo |
| 78, 80 Merrylee Road, Merrylee Parish Church And Halls, Including Gates And Railings | | | | 55°48′50″N 4°16′30″W | Category B | 33940 | Upload Photo |
| Whitemoss Avenue, Muirend Station | | | | 55°48′36″N 4°16′26″W | Category B | 33942 | Upload another image |
| 97-113 (Odd Nos) Greenhead Street 2-12 (Even Nos) James Street, 100 Tullis Street | | | | 55°50′51″N 4°13′52″W | Category B | 33846 | Upload another image |
| 117-127 (Odd Nos) Greenhead Street, 91-101 (Odd Nos) Tullis Street | | | | 55°50′47″N 4°13′50″W | Category B | 33847 | Upload Photo |
| 23 Landressy Street Bridgeton Public Library | | | | 55°50′55″N 4°13′40″W | Category B | 33850 | Upload another image |
| 577-621 (Odd Nos) London Road, 2-4 (Even Nos) Kerr Street And 3-5 (Odd Nos) Orr Street, Former Bridgeton Cross Station And Tenements | | | | 55°50′58″N 4°13′37″W | Category B | 33853 | Upload another image |
| 20 Baldinnie Road And Wardie Road Blairtummock House Including Walled Garden And Garden House | | | | 55°51′55″N 4°07′06″W | Category B | 33864 | Upload Photo |
| 358 Carntynehall Road, High Carntyne Church Including Railings | | | | 55°51′41″N 4°10′50″W | Category B | 33865 | Upload another image |
| 2270-2288 (Even Nos) Gartloch Road, Gartloch Hospital, Gartloch Cottages | | | | 55°52′52″N 4°05′46″W | Category B | 33873 | Upload Photo |
| Robroyston Road, Wallace Monument | | | | 55°53′52″N 4°11′09″W | Category B | 33874 | Upload another image |
| 1-18 (Inclusive Nos) Walmer Crescent And 1, 3, 5A, 5B Cessnock Street | | | | 55°51′07″N 4°17′48″W | Category A | 33876 | Upload another image |
| 637-647 (Odd Nos) Alexandra Parade And 81 Alexandra Park Street | | | | 55°51′48″N 4°12′41″W | Category B | 33878 | Upload Photo |
| 1-16 (Inc Nos) Annfield Place, 1 And 2B Craigpark, Including Garden Walls To South | | | | 55°51′31″N 4°13′21″W | Category B | 33884 | Upload Photo |
| 167-205 (Odd Nos) Wilton Street | | | | 55°52′43″N 4°16′46″W | Category B | 33786 | Upload Photo |
| 4-42 (Even Nos) Garry Street, 29-31 (Odd Nos) Spean Street And 162-172 (Even Nos) Holmlea Road | | | | 55°49′20″N 4°15′46″W | Category C(S) | 33804 | Upload Photo |
| 1-14 (Inclusive Numbers) Hampden Terrace And 991-1015 (Odd Nos) Cathcart Road, Including Boundary Walls | | | | 55°49′40″N 4°15′27″W | Category C(S) | 33805 | Upload another image See more images |
| Holmlea Road, New Bridge | | | | 55°49′05″N 4°15′42″W | Category B | 33806 | Upload another image |
| 352-362 (Even Nos) Holmlea Road, Tulloch Street, Spean Street, Holmlea Primary School Including Janitor's Lodge And Railings | | | | 55°49′09″N 4°15′41″W | Category B | 33807 | Upload another image |
| 149-165 (Odd Nos) Stanmore Road Including Boundary Walls | | | | 55°49′41″N 4°15′11″W | Category B | 33809 | Upload another image See more images |
| 309-341 (Odd Nos) Abercromby Street, Burial Ground | | | | 55°51′03″N 4°13′45″W | Category B | 33811 | Upload another image |
| 26-30 (Even Nos) And 42 Bain Street, 15-25 (Odd Nos) Gibson Street (Calton Street) 73, 99, 99A Moncur Street | | | | 55°51′18″N 4°14′08″W | Category B | 33813 | Upload another image |
| 142, 144 Bell Street And 18 Watson Street | | | | 55°51′25″N 4°14′30″W | Category C(S) | 33816 | Upload another image |
| 5-9 (Odd Nos) Bridgeton Cross, 1-11 (Odd Nos) Dalmarnock Road | | | | 55°50′56″N 4°13′34″W | Category C(S) | 33819 | Upload another image |
| 32-38A Bridgeton Cross | | | | 55°50′57″N 4°13′38″W | Category B | 33820 | Upload another image |
| Glasgow Green At Greenhead Street, James Martin Memorial Fountain And Canopy | | | | 55°50′57″N 4°13′59″W | Category B | 33839 | Upload another image |
| 506 And 548 Bilsland Drive, Staff Houses, 490, 492, 500, 502, 554, 556, 562 And 568 Bilsland Drive, Ruchill Hospital Former Staff Houses And Cottages | | | | 55°53′19″N 4°15′55″W | Category C(S) | 33748 | Upload Photo |
| 520 Bilsland Drive, Ruchill Hospital, Ward Pavilions | | | | 55°53′12″N 4°16′08″W | Category C(S) | 33749 | Upload Photo |
| 165 Glenhead Street, 24 Kippen Street, And Buckley Street, Parkhouse School, Janitor's House With Gatepiers, Retaining Walls And Railings | | | | 55°53′26″N 4°14′37″W | Category B | 33751 | Upload Photo |
| 50-56 (Even Nos) Ruchill Street | | | | 55°53′13″N 4°16′56″W | Category C(S) | 33752 | Upload another image |
| 1-15 (Inclusive Nos) Botanic Crescent | | | | 55°52′50″N 4°17′16″W | Category B | 33754 | Upload Photo |
| 1-11 (Inclusive Nos) Doune Gardens | | | | 55°52′42″N 4°16′47″W | Category B | 33759 | Upload Photo |
| 95 Hotspur Street, Kelbourne School And 109 Hotspur Street, Janitor's House, Gatepiers And Railings | | | | 55°53′01″N 4°17′12″W | Category C(S) | 33767 | Upload another image |
| 4-13 (Inclusive Nos) Kelvin Drive And Gatepiers | | | | 55°52′49″N 4°17′11″W | Category B | 33768 | Upload another image |
| 10 Moncrieff Street, Braid Square, North Woodside Baths And Washhouse | | | | 55°52′18″N 4°15′49″W | Category B | 33775 | Upload Photo |
| St George's Cross, Equestrian Statue | | | | 55°52′16″N 4°16′07″W | Category C(S) | 33778 | Upload another image |
| 67-107 (Odd Nos) Wilton Street And Railings | | | | 55°52′40″N 4°16′28″W | Category B | 33784 | Upload Photo |
| 143-165 (Odd Nos) Wilton Street | | | | 55°52′42″N 4°16′41″W | Category B | 33785 | Upload Photo |
| 345-349, 353, 357, 359, 363 Pollokshaws Road, 7 Butterfield Place | | | | 55°50′31″N 4°15′49″W | Category B | 33697 | Upload Photo |
| 19 Tresta Road, Western Necropolis Including Boundary Walls, Crematorium, Gatepiers, Gates And Railings, Jewish Prayer House, War Memorial And South African War Memorial | | | | 55°54′02″N 4°16′55″W | Category B | 33734 | Upload another image |
| 284-288 (Even Nos) Ashgill Road, Chirnside Primary School And Janitor`S House | | | | 55°53′32″N 4°14′37″W | Category B | 33735 | Upload Photo |
| 426 Balmore Road, Hodge Court, Former Possil School Gymnasium Including Gatepiers And Boundary Walls | | | | 55°53′29″N 4°15′30″W | Category C(S) | 33742 | Upload Photo |
| 479 Balmore Road, Former Possil Station | | | | 55°53′31″N 4°15′36″W | Category C(S) | 33744 | Upload another image See more images |
| 520 Bilsland Drive, Ruchill Hospital Administration Block, Kitchen Block, Enquiry Block, Clearing House, Mortuary Block, Main Stairway And Stables | | | | 55°53′12″N 4°16′08″W | Category B | 33746 | Upload Photo |
| 520 Bilsland Drive, Ruchill Hospital Gate Lodges | | | | 55°53′19″N 4°15′58″W | Category C(S) | 33747 | Upload Photo |
| 1281 London Road And 719, 721 Springfield Road | | | | 55°50′53″N 4°12′08″W | Category C(S) | 33640 | Upload another image |
| 679 Old Shettleston Road, Eastbank Parish Church And Hall With Railings And Gatepiers | | | | 55°51′07″N 4°09′45″W | Category B | 33641 | Upload another image |
| 591 Tollcross Road, Wellshot Road, Former Tollcross House Stables, Now East Lodge, Tollcross Park | | | | 55°50′48″N 4°10′34″W | Category C(S) | 33651 | Upload Photo |
| 1-45 (Odd Nos) Tollcross Road And 2-40 (Even Nos) Westmuir Street | | | | 55°51′04″N 4°11′45″W | Category C(S) | 33652 | Upload Photo |
| 1088 Tollcross Road, Tollcross Central Church Churchyard, Boundary Walls And Gatepiers | | | | 55°50′34″N 4°10′23″W | Category B | 33654 | Upload Photo |
| 1134 Tollcross Road And Causewayside Street, Victoria Tollcross Church And Hall, Gates, Gatepiers And Railings | | | | 55°50′34″N 4°10′13″W | Category C(S) | 33655 | Upload Photo |
| 1, 15, 16, 17 Daldowie Crematorium | | | | 55°49′56″N 4°06′51″W | Category B | 33667 | Upload Photo |
| 2405 London Road Kenmuir Mount Vernon Church Including Halls, Gates And Gatepiers (Church Of Scotland) | | | | 55°50′18″N 4°08′57″W | Category B | 33671 | Upload another image |
| 10 Muirhead Road, Ballieston | | | | 55°50′54″N 4°06′31″W | Category B | 33674 | Upload Photo |
| 1651 Shettleston Road, St Paul's Roman Catholic Church | | | | 55°51′03″N 4°09′09″W | Category B | 33678 | Upload Photo |
| 378-390 (Even Nos) Cathcart Road And 153 Coplaw Street, Savings Bank Buildings | | | | 55°50′22″N 4°15′25″W | Category C(S) | 33686 | Upload another image See more images |
| 221 Crookston Road, Ross Hall (Original Block) | | | | 55°50′21″N 4°21′52″W | Category B | 33593 | Upload another image |
| 1-10 Hillington Park Circus | | | | 55°50′51″N 4°20′50″W | Category C(S) | 33598 | Upload Photo |
| Ralston Avenue 97 (Dunard) And 101 (Raeberry), Including Boundary Walls And Gatepiers | | | | 55°50′31″N 4°22′07″W | Category B | 33605 | Upload Photo |
| Viaduct At Salterland | | | | 55°48′45″N 4°22′31″W | Category B | 33608 | Upload Photo |
| Midwharf Street And North Canalbank Street, Forth And Clyde Canal, Railway Swing Bridge Including Stone Platforms And Revetments | | | | 55°52′20″N 4°15′05″W | Category B | 33616 | Upload another image |
| 201 Springburn Road, Sighthill Cemetery, Including Lodge And Gatepiers And Gateway At Keppochill Road | | | | 55°52′46″N 4°14′16″W | Category B | 33623 | Upload another image |
| 48 Avenue Street, 190, 210 Fielden Street And 35, 51 Barrowfield Street | | | | 55°51′00″N 4°12′59″W | Category B | 33626 | Upload Photo |
| 146 Crownpoint Road | | | | 55°51′08″N 4°13′21″W | Category B | 33629 | Upload Photo |
| 1264 Gallowgate, Eastern Necropolis, Including Lodge Gateway And Boundary Walls | | | | 55°51′09″N 4°12′06″W | Category B | 33633 | Upload another image |
| 52-64 (Even Nos) Helenvale Street | | | | 55°51′00″N 4°11′49″W | Category C(S) | 33635 | Upload Photo |
| 252, 254, 256 Paisley Road West And 2, 4, 6, Harvie Street | | | | 55°51′09″N 4°17′22″W | Category B | 33527 | Upload Photo |
| 17 Milnpark Street With Elevation To Seaward Street, Kinning Park Pumping Station | | | | 55°51′06″N 4°16′40″W | Category B | 33537 | Upload Photo |
| 104-118 Tradeston Street (Even Nos), Return Elevation To Cook Street Former Clydesdale Paint, Colour And Oil Works | | | | 55°51′06″N 4°15′52″W | Category B | 33538 | Upload another image |
| 52 First Gardens, Hazelwood House | | | | 55°50′39″N 4°18′43″W | Category B | 33574 | Upload another image See more images |
| 28-68 (Inclusive Nos) Ibrox Terrace | | | | 55°51′09″N 4°18′11″W | Category B | 33576 | Upload Photo |
| 135 Cardonald Place Road, Cardonald Place Farmhouse And Steading | | | | 55°50′31″N 4°21′22″W | Category C(S) | 33587 | Upload Photo |
| 553-609 (Odd Nos) Shields Road, 271-277 (Odd Nos) Albert Drive, 86-88 (Even Nos) Leslie Street, Knowe Terrace Including Gatepiers And Railings | | | | 55°50′33″N 4°16′34″W | Category B | 33479 | Upload Photo |
| 110 Springkell Avenue, Kelmscott, Including Boundary Walls And Gatepiers | | | | 55°50′23″N 4°18′05″W | Category B | 33485 | Upload Photo |
| 124 Springkell Avenue, Benefrey, Including Boundary Walls And Gatepiers | | | | 55°50′21″N 4°18′17″W | Category A | 33486 | Upload Photo |
| 21, 23, 25 Carlton Court | | | | 55°51′15″N 4°15′27″W | Category B | 33498 | Upload another image |
| 600-614 Eglinton Street (Even Nos), 26 Gourock Street | | | | 55°50′40″N 4°15′45″W | Category B | 33510 | Upload another image |
| 28 And 58 Lorne Street, Lorne Street School And Janitor's House | | | | 55°51′13″N 4°17′17″W | Category B | 33517 | Upload another image |
| 17-57 (Odd Nos) Fotheringay Road | | | | 55°50′14″N 4°16′55″W | Category B | 33405 | Upload Photo |
| 8 Leslie Road, Including Conservatory Boundary Walls And Gatepiers | | | | 55°50′29″N 4°16′45″W | Category B | 33417 | Upload another image See more images |
| 16, 18 Leven Street And 251 Kenmure Street | | | | 55°50′23″N 4°16′23″W | Category B | 33420 | Upload Photo |
| 30-50 (Even Nos) Leven Street, 645-661 (Odd Nos) Shields Road And 45-51 (Odd Nos) Melville Street, Including Railings | | | | 55°50′26″N 4°16′37″W | Category C(S) | 33421 | Upload another image See more images |
| 1, 13, 15 Maxwell Road And 320-328 (Even Nos) Pollokshaws Road | | | | 55°50′34″N 4°15′47″W | Category B | 33426 | Upload another image |
| 336-362 (Even Nos) Maxwell Road, 459 Shields Road | | | | 55°50′41″N 4°16′30″W | Category B | 33427 | Upload Photo |
| 229 Nithsdale Road, Allerly, Including Boundary Walls And Gatepiers | | | | 55°50′34″N 4°17′34″W | Category B | 33442 | Upload Photo |
| 84-112 (Even Nos) Nithsdale Road, 256-280 (Even Nos) Darnley Street And 281-289 (Odd Nos) Kenmure Street | | | | 55°50′19″N 4°16′27″W | Category B | 33444 | Upload another image See more images |
| 2060 Pollokshaws Road, Pollok House Including Service Court, Forecourt, Garden Walling And Pavilions | | | | 55°49′39″N 4°19′04″W | Category A | 33455 | Upload another image See more images |
| 59 St Andrew's Drive, Ardenlea, Including Boundary Walls And Gatepiers | | | | 55°50′38″N 4°17′16″W | Category B | 33462 | Upload Photo |
| Carmunnock, 68, 70 Busby Road, Miln Flat | | | | 55°47′15″N 4°14′35″W | Category C(S) | 33315 | Upload Photo |
| Carmunnock, 8 & 8A Kirk Road, Begg's House | | | | 55°47′27″N 4°14′08″W | Category B | 33321 | Upload Photo |
| Carmunnock, 1, 3 Pathead Road, Weaver's Cottage And Broom Cottage | | | | 55°47′22″N 4°14′09″W | Category C(S) | 33328 | Upload Photo |
| 71 Broomloan Road, Broomloan Road Public School, Now Nursery School And Summertown Centre With Return Elevations To Summertown Road And Neptune Street | | | | 55°51′33″N 4°18′33″W | Category B | 33335 | Upload Photo |
| 2 Water Row, Govan Cross, New Govan Church Of Scotland, Former St Mary's Church | | | | 55°51′47″N 4°18′38″W | Category B | 33358 | Upload another image See more images |
| 5,7,9 Water Row Former Ymca | | | | 55°51′48″N 4°18′42″W | Category B | 33362 | Upload Photo |
| 301 Albert Drive, The Knowe, Including Lodge, Boundary Walls, Gates, Gatepiers And Gateway | | | | 55°50′34″N 4°16′37″W | Category A | 33371 | Upload Photo |
| 352 Albert Drive, The Hollies, Including Boundary Walls And Gatepiers | | | | 55°50′41″N 4°17′29″W | Category B | 33383 | Upload Photo |
| 362 Albert Drive, Park Lodge, Including Boundary Walls, Gatepiers And Railings | | | | 55°50′40″N 4°17′39″W | Category B | 33385 | Upload Photo |
| 49, 49A Aytoun Road, Including Boundary Walls And Gatepiers | | | | 55°50′35″N 4°17′17″W | Category C(S) | 33386 | Upload Photo |
| 3 Bruce Road, Including Boundary Walls And Gatepiers | | | | 55°50′37″N 4°16′38″W | Category B | 33387 | Upload Photo |
| 7 And 7A Bruce Road, Leven View, Including Boundary Walls And Gatepiers | | | | 55°50′38″N 4°16′42″W | Category B | 33388 | Upload Photo |
| 31 Dalziel Drive, Including Boundary Walls And Gatepiers | | | | 55°50′30″N 4°17′43″W | Category B | 33394 | Upload Photo |
| 42 Dalziel Drive, Oak Knowe, Including Boundary Walls And Gatepiers | | | | 55°50′31″N 4°17′31″W | Category B | 33398 | Upload Photo |
| 8 Nelson Mandela Place, Former Athenaeum | | | | 55°51′45″N 4°15′15″W | Category A | 33234 | Upload another image |
| 138, 140 West George Street, Provincial House | | | | 55°51′45″N 4°15′25″W | Category B | 33240 | Upload Photo |
| 250-256 (Even Nos) West George Street (Known As 256) | | | | 55°51′47″N 4°15′43″W | Category B | 33249 | Upload Photo |
| 106 West Nile Street, (Former Victoria Baths) | | | | 55°51′47″N 4°15′15″W | Category B | 33254 | Upload Photo |
| 85-89 (Odd Nos) West Regent Street | | | | 55°51′47″N 4°15′30″W | Category C(S) | 33260 | Upload Photo |
| 62-82 (Even Nos) West Regent Street | | | | 55°51′48″N 4°15′25″W | Category C(S) | 33270 | Upload Photo |
| 146, 146A West Regent Street | | | | 55°51′50″N 4°15′37″W | Category C(S) | 33275 | Upload Photo |
| 152-154A (Even Nos) West Regent Street And 130, 132 (Known As 130) West Campbell Street | | | | 55°51′50″N 4°15′38″W | Category B | 33277 | Upload Photo |
| 133 Balornock Road, Stobhill Hospital, Medical Superintendent's House Including Staff Dining Room | | | | 55°53′33″N 4°13′15″W | Category B | 33291 | Upload Photo |
| 50 Mansel Street And 61, Syriam Street, Springburn Academy, Former Albert Secondary School Including Janitor's Lodge | | | | 55°53′09″N 4°13′29″W | Category B | 33295 | Upload Photo |
| 470, 480, 490, 500 And 510 Shieldhall Road, Hardgate Road, Luma Tower | | | | 55°51′36″N 4°20′50″W | Category B | 33308 | Upload another image |
| 9 Skipness Drive, Linthouse/St Kenneth's Church Including Original Church Hall And Church Officer's House | | | | 55°51′48″N 4°19′50″W | Category B | 33313 | Upload another image |
| 269-305 (Odd Nos) Sauchiehall Street, 123-127 (Odd Nos) Douglas Street, 192-200 (Even Nos) Pitt Street, Osborne Buildings | | | | 55°51′55″N 4°15′51″W | Category B | 33176 | Upload Photo |
| 515-543 (Odd Nos) Sauchiehall Street And 241, 245 North Street | | | | 55°51′57″N 4°16′21″W | Category B | 33182 | Upload Photo |
| 901, 903 Sauchiehall Street | | | | 55°51′55″N 4°17′05″W | Category A | 33184 | Upload Photo |
| 931-979 (Odd Nos) Sauchiehall Street And 10-14 (Even Nos) Gray Street, 21 Derby Street (Wellesley Terrace) | | | | 55°51′57″N 4°17′11″W | Category B | 33185 | Upload Photo |
| 76-82 (Even Nos) Sauchiehall Street And 109-117 (Odd Nos) Renfield Street | | | | 55°51′53″N 4°15′21″W | Category B | 33187 | Upload Photo |
| 518 Sauchiehall Street and 333 Renfrew Street | | | | 55°51′59″N 4°16′11″W | Category B | 33198 | Upload another image |
| 122-136 (Even Nos) Union Street And 41-55 (Odd Nos) Gordon Street And Union Place, Ca d’Oro Building | | | | 55°51′37″N 4°15′24″W | Category A | 33209 | Upload another image |
| 27 Washington Street, Anderston Rice Mills | | | | 55°51′31″N 4°16′05″W | Category B | 33210 | Upload Photo |
| 15-23 (Odd Nos) Waterloo Street, Waterloo Chambers | | | | 55°51′36″N 4°15′36″W | Category B | 33212 | Upload Photo |
| 74 Waterloo Street, Fortune House, 70 Blythswood Street | | | | 55°51′39″N 4°15′47″W | Category B | 33216 | Upload Photo |
| 18-25 (Inclusive Nos) Westminster Terrace, Sauchiehall Street | | | | 55°51′55″N 4°17′01″W | Category B | 33220 | Upload Photo |

== Key ==
The scheme for classifying buildings in Scotland is:

- Category A: "buildings of national or international importance, either architectural or historic; or fine, little-altered examples of some particular period, style or building type."
- Category B: "buildings of regional or more than local importance; or major examples of some particular period, style or building type, which may have been altered."
- Category C: "buildings of local importance; lesser examples of any period, style, or building type, as originally constructed or moderately altered; and simple traditional buildings which group well with other listed buildings."

In March 2016 there were 47,288 listed buildings in Scotland. Of these, 8% were Category A, and 50% were Category B, with the remaining 42% being Category C.

== See also ==
- List of listed buildings in Glasgow
