= List of listed buildings in Glasgow/12 =

This is a list of listed buildings in Glasgow, Scotland.

== List ==
Name	Location	Date Listed	Grid Ref. (Note: Sometimes known as OSGB36, the grid reference (where provided) is based on the British national grid reference system used by the Ordnance Survey. • "Guide to National Grid". Ordnance Survey. • "Get-a-map". Ordnance Survey.)	Geo-coordinates	Notes	LB Number (Note: Historic Environment Scotland assign a unique alphanumeric identifier to each designated site in Scotland, for listed buildings this always begins with "LB", for example "LB12345".)	Image
79-89 (Odd Nos) Glassford Street, The Trades House				55°51′33″N 4°14′57″W	Category A	32713	Upload another image See more images
111 High Street And 2 And 4 Blackfriars Street, The Black Bull				55°51′30″N 4°14′32″W	Category C(S)	32720	Upload Photo
104 Argyle Street				55°51′30″N 4°15′14″W	Category C(S)	32615	Upload Photo
106-114 (Even Nos) Argyle Street				55°51′30″N 4°15′15″W	Category B	32616	Upload another image
23 Saltoun Street, Belmont And Hillhead Parish Church, Church Of Scotland				55°52′39″N 4°17′36″W	Category A	32584	Upload another image
1 Sydenham Road				55°52′46″N 4°18′08″W	Category B	32585	Upload Photo
160 Observatory Road, Notre Dame High School				55°52′42″N 4°17′57″W	Category A	32571	Upload another image
11 And 11A Horselethill Road And 1A Victoria Circus With Balustrading Walls And Gatepiers				55°52′45″N 4°17′54″W	Category B	32525	Upload Photo
25 Hughenden Road, (Hughenden House)				55°52′54″N 4°18′20″W	Category B	32526	Upload Photo
5 Kensington Road, Northbank House And Gatepiers				55°52′45″N 4°18′05″W	Category B	32537	Upload Photo
730 Great Western Road; Botanic Gardens, Footbridge Over River Kelvin				55°52′47″N 4°17′17″W	Category B	32510	Upload another image
20 Bellshaugh Road; Kelvinside Academy With Boundary Railings And Gateways				55°52′58″N 4°17′41″W	Category A	32476	Upload another image See more images
44 And 44A Queen Mary Avenue				55°49′57″N 4°15′36″W	Category B	32443	Upload another image See more images
48 Queen Mary Avenue, Marie Stuart Hotel				55°49′57″N 4°15′34″W	Category C(S)	32444	Upload another image See more images
56 Queen Mary Avenue And 30, 32 Crosshill Avenue				55°49′55″N 4°15′27″W	Category B	32445	Upload another image
40 Queen's Drive, Former Crosshill Queen's Park Church, Including Boundary Walls With Railings And Gatepiers				55°49′56″N 4°15′41″W	Category A	32451	Upload another image See more images
12 Airlie Street, Hyndland Public School				55°52′38″N 4°18′40″W	Category B	32469	Upload Photo
Athole Gardens Piers And Railings To Gardens				55°52′38″N 4°17′45″W	Category B	32470	Upload another image
Pollokshaws Road, Gatepiers To Queen's Park				55°50′06″N 4°16′21″W	Category C(S)	32400	Upload another image See more images
799 Pollokshaws Road, Camphill House (Within Queen's Park)				55°49′56″N 4°16′31″W	Category A	32401	Upload another image
20 Balvicar Drive, Balvicar Street, Camphill, Queen's Park Church And Hall				55°50′03″N 4°16′16″W	Category A	32359	Upload another image See more images
155 Camphill Avenue Thornwood Hall Including Gatepier				55°49′28″N 4°16′42″W	Category C(S)	32363	Upload Photo
2 Falloch Road, 60 Lochleven Road, Former Queen's Park Synagogue				55°49′30″N 4°15′59″W	Category B	32368	Upload Photo
517 Langside Road, Victoria Infirmary Administration Block				55°49′41″N 4°16′06″W	Category B	32370	Upload another image See more images
23 Mansionhouse Road St John Residential Home				55°49′34″N 4°16′28″W	Category B	32372	Upload another image See more images
27 Mansionhouse Road Boswell Country Club				55°49′31″N 4°16′31″W	Category C(S)	32374	Upload another image
603, 605 Pollokshaws Road, Strathbungo Parish Church				55°50′15″N 4°16′06″W	Category B	32397	Upload another image See more images
58 Cleveden Drive, "Amalfi House", Boundary Walls And Gatepiers				55°53′04″N 4°18′23″W	Category B	32311	Upload Photo
1055 Great Western Road, Nurses Home, Gartnavel Royal Hospital				55°52′57″N 4°19′12″W	Category B	32319	Upload Photo
994 Great Western Road "Ravelston" And Gatepiers				55°52′59″N 4°18′15″W	Category B	32332	Upload Photo
11, 11A, B, C Winton Drive				55°53′09″N 4°18′07″W	Category B	32344	Upload Photo
10 Woodend Drive, All Saints Episcopal Church, Jordanhill				55°53′07″N 4°19′37″W	Category B	32346	Upload Photo
Hawick Street, Valve House				55°53′31″N 4°23′03″W	Category C(S)	32276	Upload Photo
8 And 16 Queen Victoria Drive, Dumbarton Road, Scotstoun West Church And Hall, (Church Of Scotland)				55°52′46″N 4°21′03″W	Category B	32279	Upload Photo
14 Victoria Park Drive South, Whiteinch Public Library				55°52′27″N 4°20′00″W	Category B	32283	Upload another image
1 University Avenue/49 Gibson Street, Glasgow University, Sir Charles Wilson Building, Former Hillhead Congregational Church				55°52′21″N 4°17′03″W	Category C(S)	32250	Upload another image
133 Woodlands Road, Church Of St Jude's Congregation (Free Presbyterian Church)				55°52′10″N 4°16′30″W	Category B	32262	Upload Photo
Woodlands Terrace Stairway To Clifton Street				55°52′05″N 4°16′45″W	Category A	32267	Upload another image
517-529 (Odd Nos) Great Western Road				55°52′32″N 4°16′59″W	Category B	32203	Upload Photo
531-535 (Odd Nos) Great Western Road And 1-3 (Odd Nos) Oakfield Avenue				55°52′32″N 4°17′00″W	Category B	32204	Upload Photo
Kelvingrove Park Statue Group Of Tigress, Cubs And Peacock				55°52′06″N 4°16′57″W	Category B	32209	Upload Photo
Kelvingrove Park, Prince Of Wales Bridge				55°52′13″N 4°17′04″W	Category B	32210	Upload Photo
61 Arlington Street And 44 Westend Park Street, Arlington Street Baths				55°52′15″N 4°16′24″W	Category B	32173	Upload another image
65 And 69 Bank Street				55°52′23″N 4°17′02″W	Category B	32178	Upload Photo
Belmont Street Belmont Bridge				55°52′39″N 4°16′47″W	Category B	32182	Upload Photo
Argyle Street, Kelvin Hall, Arena And Museum Of Transport				55°52′06″N 4°17′40″W	Category B	48034	Upload another image
Atlas Road, Springburn Railway Station Including Boundary Wall				55°52′55″N 4°13′51″W	Category B	49898	Upload another image
508-512 (Even Nos) Great Western Road				55°52′33″N 4°16′57″W	Category B	49918	Upload Photo
1 Salisbury Street, Former Cumberland Street Station				55°50′54″N 4°15′24″W	Category B	49934	Upload another image
Partick, Victoria Park, Partick Curling Club Pavilion				55°52′33″N 4°19′44″W	Category C(S)	51588	Upload Photo
101 John Street And 4 Martha Street, University Of Strathclyde Chaplaincy Centre (Former St Paul's Church)				55°51′44″N 4°14′51″W	Category B	45641	Upload Photo
46, 48 Garscadden Road, 19, 21, 23 Balvie Drive, Former Old Drumchapel Primary School With Gateways				55°54′07″N 4°21′56″W	Category C(S)	43385	Upload Photo
2 Anniesland Road, Public Conveniences				55°53′25″N 4°19′36″W	Category C(S)	43033	Upload Photo
1875 Great Western Road, 61-65 (Odd Nos) Munro Place, Former Strathclyde Omnibus Depot With Boundary Walls, Gatepiers And Railings				55°53′30″N 4°20′01″W	Category B	43036	Upload Photo
230 Broomhill Drive, Broomhill Cross, Balshagray Church With Boundary Walls And Gatepiers				55°52′32″N 4°19′12″W	Category B	33973	Upload Photo
480A And 480B Gallowgate, Elcho Street				55°51′20″N 4°13′46″W	Category B	33974	Upload Photo
Cathedral Square, The Necropolis				55°51′46″N 4°13′51″W	Category A	33890	Upload another image
1, 1A Corrour Road, Kingarth Including Perimeter Walls And Gatepiers				55°49′26″N 4°17′09″W	Category C(S)	33921	Upload Photo
29 Langside Drive, Newlands Bowling Club Pavilion				55°49′05″N 4°16′37″W	Category B	33930	Upload Photo
33 Langside Drive, The Grange Including Boundary Walls And Gatepiers				55°49′03″N 4°16′39″W	Category C(S)	33931	Upload Photo
75-77 (Odd Nos) Tobago Street				55°51′07″N 4°13′52″W	Category C(S)	33858	Upload Photo
Auchinlea Road, Provan Hall Road, Provan Hall				55°52′18″N 4°07′52″W	Category A	33863	Upload another image
Gartloch Road, Gartloch Hospital Former Medical Superintendent's House				55°52′41″N 4°06′31″W	Category B	33869	Upload Photo
Gartloch Road, Gartloch Hospital Former Mortuary				55°52′45″N 4°06′28″W	Category B	33870	Upload another image
681 Alexandra Parade And 6 Easter Craigs, St Andrew`s East Church And Railings				55°51′47″N 4°12′31″W	Category A	33879	Upload another image
685 Alexandra Parade, St Andrew`s East Church Hall And Railings				55°51′47″N 4°12′30″W	Category A	48569	Upload another image
Alexandra Parade, Alexandra Park Gateways And Boundary Walls Fronting Alexandra Parade				55°51′47″N 4°12′35″W	Category C(S)	33882	Upload another image
15 Millbrae Road And 18-26 (Even Nos) Overdale Avenue				55°49′38″N 4°16′12″W	Category C(S)	33798	Upload Photo
94 Duke Street St Mungo's Rc School Annexe Including Gatepiers (Formerly Alexander's School)				55°51′34″N 4°14′08″W	Category A	33827	Upload another image
163-179 (Odd Nos) Gallowgate Dovehill Court (Originally J And G Melior Buildings)				55°51′21″N 4°14′20″W	Category C(S)	33831	Upload Photo
Glasgow Green, Saltmarket, Sir William Collins Memorial Fountain				55°51′12″N 4°14′43″W	Category B	33840	Upload another image See more images
6 St George's Place, 20 Great Western Road And Part 9 Clarendon Court/Clarendon Place				55°52′17″N 4°16′06″W	Category B	33779	Upload Photo
325 Carmunnock Road, King's Park, Aikenhead House Walled Garden				55°48′47″N 4°14′29″W	Category C(S)	33710	Upload Photo
Maryhill Road, Killermont Bridge				55°54′25″N 4°18′52″W	Category B	33729	Upload Photo
1346-1364 (Even Nos) Shettleston Road, Eastbank Academy Including Gates And Railings (East End Fe College)				55°51′04″N 4°09′43″W	Category B	33647	Upload Photo
75-89 (Odd Nos) Whitevale Street, Public Baths And Washhouse				55°51′18″N 4°12′59″W	Category B	33658	Upload Photo
197 Crookston Road, Lodge, Gatepiers And Quadrants				55°50′25″N 4°21′52″W	Category B	33591	Upload Photo
510 Crookston Road, Leverndale Hospital, Female Nurses' Home				55°50′02″N 4°21′51″W	Category B	33595	Upload Photo
532 Kennishead Road, Kennishead Farmhouse And Steading				55°48′51″N 4°19′44″W	Category C(S)	33599	Upload Photo
184 Possil Road Corner With Dawson Road, Rockvilla School Retaining Walls				55°52′36″N 4°15′31″W	Category B	33621	Upload Photo
Springburn Road, Sighthill Cemetery Memorial To Baird And Hardie				55°52′34″N 4°14′09″W	Category B	33624	Upload Photo
197-243 (Odd Nos) Pollokshaws Road, St Andrews Power Station				55°50′40″N 4°15′35″W	Category B	33529	Upload another image
8 And 14 Scotland Street				55°51′00″N 4°16′04″W	Category B	33536	Upload Photo
133 Wallace Street And 161 West Street Former Victoria Grain Mills				55°51′08″N 4°15′53″W	Category B	33539	Upload Photo
Windmillcroft Quay (East End)				55°51′20″N 4°15′52″W	Category B	33540	Upload Photo
423 Paisley Road West, Iqra Academy, Former Bellahouston Academy Annexe				55°51′03″N 4°17′55″W	Category B	33577	Upload Photo
101 Terregles Avenue, Fotheringay Road, Maxwell Park Station, Including Footbridges				55°50′15″N 4°17′20″W	Category B	33489	Upload another image
20, 22 Bridge Street And 4 Kingston Street				55°51′14″N 4°15′32″W	Category B	33495	Upload Photo
54, 56 Cook Street, Return Elevation To West Street, Former Tradeston Paint Mills				55°51′06″N 4°15′53″W	Category C(S)	33505	Upload Photo
144-150 (Even Nos) Norfolk Street And 69, 71 Bridge Street				55°51′10″N 4°15′31″W	Category B	33520	Upload Photo
62 Glencairn Drive, Carslogie, Including Boundary Walls And Gatepiers				55°50′21″N 4°17′03″W	Category C(S)	33410	Upload Photo
25, 25A Maxwell Drive, Including Boundary Walls And Gatepiers				55°50′43″N 4°16′57″W	Category B	33424	Upload Photo
231 Nithsdale Road And Albert Drive, Xaverton House (Formerly Oakleigh), Including Gatepiers And Boundary Walls				55°50′34″N 4°17′36″W	Category B	33443	Upload Photo
Carmunnock 80 Busby Road Carnbooth House				55°47′17″N 4°15′07″W	Category B	33316	Upload Photo
Carmunnock, 24 Kirk Road				55°47′24″N 4°14′08″W	Category B	33324	Upload Photo
140 Copland Road				55°51′16″N 4°18′17″W	Category C(S)	33337	Upload Photo
100-170 Edmiston Drive, Ibrox Stadium (The Stand By Edmiston Drive Only)				55°51′10″N 4°18′37″W	Category B	33338	Upload another image
866, 868 Govan Road, Govan Old Parish Church (C Of S)				55°51′53″N 4°18′47″W	Category A	33353	Upload another image See more images
1048 Govan Road, Govan Shipbuilders' Store, Former Engine Works Of Fairfield Shipbuilding And Engineering Company				55°51′56″N 4°19′25″W	Category A	33357	Upload Photo
24, 26 Bruce Road, Including Boundary Walls And Gatepiers				55°50′42″N 4°17′00″W	Category C(S)	33393	Upload Photo
222, 224 Darnley Street And 1 Leven Street				55°50′21″N 4°16′18″W	Category B	33403	Upload another image See more images
150-154 (Even Nos) West George Street				55°51′46″N 4°15′27″W	Category B	33242	Upload Photo
97, 99 West Regent Street				55°51′47″N 4°15′32″W	Category C(S)	33263	Upload Photo
101, 103 West Regent Street				55°51′47″N 4°15′32″W	Category C(S)	33264	Upload Photo
126, 128 West Regent Street And 129 Wellington Street				55°51′49″N 4°15′34″W	Category B	33273	Upload Photo
Stobcross Quay, Stobcross Crane, Otherwise Known As Finnieston Crane				55°51′30″N 4°17′04″W	Category A	33285	Upload another image
133 Balornock Road, Stobhill Hospital, Water Tower Block				55°53′36″N 4°13′13″W	Category B	33289	Upload Photo
1A Drumoyne Drive And Langlands Road, Elder Cottage Hospital				55°51′38″N 4°19′40″W	Category A	33300	Upload Photo
2A Drumoyne Drive And Langlands Road, Elder Cottage Hospital (West Block)				55°51′38″N 4°19′42″W	Category B	33301	Upload Photo
373-387 (Odd Nos) Sauchiehall Street				55°51′56″N 4°16′02″W	Category B	33179	Upload Photo
460, 468 Sauchiehall Street, Baird Hall Of Residence				55°51′58″N 4°16′05″W	Category B	33195	Upload another image
84-100 (Even Nos) Union Street				55°51′35″N 4°15′24″W	Category A	33208	Upload another image See more images
159-167 (Odd Nos) West George Street And 136-140 (Even Nos) Hope Street				55°51′44″N 4°15′28″W	Category B	33226	Upload Photo
81-91 (Odd Nos) St Vincent Street				55°51′40″N 4°15′22″W	Category B	33134	Upload Photo
147 St Vincent Street And 91 Wellington Street				55°51′42″N 4°15′37″W	Category B	33143	Upload Photo
203-207 (Odd Nos) St Vincent Street				55°51′43″N 4°15′45″W	Category C(S)	33147	Upload Photo
130-136A (Even Nos) St Vincent Street, 124-132 (Even Nos) Hope Street And 61, 63 West George Lane				55°51′43″N 4°15′28″W	Category B	33158	Upload Photo
137-143 (Odd Nos) Sauchiehall Street				55°51′52″N 4°15′29″W	Category B	33171	Upload Photo
38 New City Road, Dundas Vale Teachers' Centre, Formerly Normal School				55°52′07″N 4°15′38″W	Category B	33091	Upload Photo
14, 18 St Enoch Square And 5 St Enoch Place				55°51′28″N 4°15′21″W	Category B	33122	Upload another image
52-58 (Even Nos) Gordon Street 6-16 (Even Nos) Renfield Street And 23-27 (Odd Nos) Drury Street				55°51′39″N 4°15′23″W	Category B	33033	Upload Photo
82-92 (Even Nos) Gordon Street And 94-104 (Even Nos), Hope Street, Standard Buildings				55°51′39″N 4°15′30″W	Category B	33035	Upload Photo
125 Hill Street				55°52′02″N 4°16′03″W	Category B	33039	Upload Photo
254-290 (Even Nos) Hope Street, Theatre Royal				55°51′59″N 4°15′22″W	Category A	33061	Upload another image
Kelvingrove Park At Dumbarton Road, Cameronians Monument				55°52′10″N 4°17′32″W	Category B	33072	Upload another image
38, 38A Bath Street And Sauchiehall Lane, Former Mechanics' Institute				55°51′50″N 4°15′18″W	Category B	32965	Upload another image
97-113, 117 (Odd Nos) Berkeley Street, 117 Elderslie Street, 100, Kent Road				55°51′53″N 4°16′35″W	Category B	32974	Upload Photo
95-99 (Odd Nos) Buchanan Street				55°51′36″N 4°15′17″W	Category B	32999	Upload Photo
113-115 (Odd Nos) Buchanan Street And 4 Gordon Street				55°51′38″N 4°15′16″W	Category A	33000	Upload another image
163 Buchanan Street And Nelson Mandela Place, Former St George's Place, St George's Tron Parish Church (Church Of Scotland)				55°51′43″N 4°15′14″W	Category A	33003	Upload another image
298-306 (Even Nos) Clyde Street, Former Custom House, Now Office Of Procurator Fiscal				55°51′23″N 4°15′24″W	Category A	33012	Upload another image
49 Derby Street, 22, 30 Bentinck Street				55°52′00″N 4°17′05″W	Category A	33015	Upload another image
17-21 (Odd Nos) Drury Street, Including The Horseshoe Public House				55°51′39″N 4°15′23″W	Category A	33016	Upload Photo
58 Elliot Street				55°51′35″N 4°16′43″W	Category B	33019	Upload another image
1J Gilmorehill, University Of Glasgow, Natural Philosophy Building				55°52′18″N 4°17′30″W	Category B	32923	Upload another image
82 University Avenue, University Of Glasgow, Reading Room				55°52′22″N 4°17′17″W	Category A	32927	Upload another image
12 University Gardens				55°52′24″N 4°17′26″W	Category A	32932	Upload another image
24 Vinicombe Street, Former Botanic Gardens Garage				55°52′38″N 4°17′24″W	Category A	32935	Upload another image
158, 160 Argyle Street And 1 Mitchell Lane				55°51′30″N 4°15′21″W	Category B	32949	Upload Photo
186, 188 Argyle Street, The Grant Arms				55°51′31″N 4°15′27″W	Category B	32950	Upload Photo
71, B, C, D Partickhill Road				55°52′31″N 4°18′36″W	Category B	32892	Upload Photo
74 Partickhill Road				55°52′32″N 4°18′33″W	Category B	32898	Upload Photo
76 University Avenue, Wellington Church				55°52′21″N 4°17′13″W	Category A	32912	Upload another image
38 Church Street, 10A Dumbarton Road, Western Infirmary, Tennent Memorial Building				55°52′17″N 4°17′48″W	Category B	32856	Upload another image
8-12 (Even Nos) Cranworth Street, Hillhead Western Baths Club				55°52′36″N 4°17′27″W	Category B	32859	Upload Photo
56 Dumbarton Road, University Of Glasgow, Anderson's College Of Medicine				55°52′13″N 4°17′48″W	Category B	32867	Upload Photo
46 Fortrose Street And Gatepiers				55°52′24″N 4°18′29″W	Category B	32869	Upload Photo
Kelvingrove Park Snow Bridge				55°52′11″N 4°17′37″W	Category B	32882	Upload another image
60 Parson Street, St Mungo's Church				55°51′56″N 4°14′17″W	Category B	32814	Upload Photo
111 Queen Street And 46-58 (Even Nos) Royal Exchange Square, Gallery Of Modern Art (Former Stirling's Library, Former Cunninghame Mansion And Former Royal Exchange)				55°51′36″N 4°15′09″W	Category A	32818	Upload another image
151-157 (Odd Nos) Queen Street (St George's Buildings)				55°51′38″N 4°15′08″W	Category A	32819	Upload another image

== Key ==
The scheme for classifying buildings in Scotland is:

- Category A: "buildings of national or international importance, either architectural or historic; or fine, little-altered examples of some particular period, style or building type."
- Category B: "buildings of regional or more than local importance; or major examples of some particular period, style or building type, which may have been altered."
- Category C: "buildings of local importance; lesser examples of any period, style, or building type, as originally constructed or moderately altered; and simple traditional buildings which group well with other listed buildings."

In March 2016 there were 47,288 listed buildings in Scotland. Of these, 8% were Category A, and 50% were Category B, with the remaining 42% being Category C.

== See also ==
- List of listed buildings in Glasgow
