= List of listed buildings in Glasgow/13 =

This is a list of listed buildings in Glasgow, Scotland.

== List ==
Name	Location	Date Listed	Grid Ref. (Note: Sometimes known as OSGB36, the grid reference (where provided) is based on the British national grid reference system used by the Ordnance Survey. • "Guide to National Grid". Ordnance Survey. • "Get-a-map". Ordnance Survey.)	Geo-coordinates	Notes	LB Number (Note: Historic Environment Scotland assign a unique alphanumeric identifier to each designated site in Scotland, for listed buildings this always begins with "LB", for example "LB12345".)	Image
178 Royston Hill Townhead Blochairn Parish Church (Church Of Scotland)				55°52′05″N 4°13′38″W	Category A	32828	Upload another image
205-217 (Odd Nos) Ingram Street With 94-104 (Even Nos) Miller Street				55°51′35″N 4°15′02″W	Category B	32736	Upload Photo
108-112 (Even Nos) Ingram Street And 10-12 (Even Nos) Montrose Street				55°51′36″N 4°14′44″W	Category B	32741	Upload another image
16 Mcphater Street, And Return Elevation To Dunblane Street (Ozalid's)				55°52′02″N 4°15′19″W	Category A	32754	Upload Photo
90 Maxwell Street				55°51′22″N 4°15′15″W	Category B	32756	Upload Photo
53-59 (Odd Nos) Miller Street				55°51′32″N 4°15′05″W	Category B	32757	Upload Photo
260 Clyde Street				55°51′22″N 4°15′19″W	Category C(S)	32670	Upload another image See more images
32 Fox Street				55°51′23″N 4°15′17″W	Category B	32680	Upload Photo
9 George Square, 5 Hanover Street, Lomond House				55°51′38″N 4°15′03″W	Category B	32686	Upload Photo
George Square, Queen Victoria Statue				55°51′41″N 4°15′04″W	Category A	32702	Upload another image See more images
151-59 (Odd Nos) George Street, University Of Strathclyde Alexander Turnbull Building				55°51′39″N 4°14′40″W	Category C(S)	32706	Upload Photo
266 George Street				55°51′42″N 4°14′53″W	Category A	32709	Upload another image
57-59 (Odd Nos) Glassford Street And 83-85 (Odd Nos) Wilson Street With Entrance To Glassford Court				55°51′31″N 4°14′58″W	Category B	32711	Upload Photo
16, 18, 28, 30 And 32 Argyle Street With Return Elevation To Virginia Street				55°51′28″N 4°15′02″W	Category B	32610	Upload another image
116-120 (Even Nos) Argyle Street				55°51′30″N 4°15′16″W	Category B	32617	Upload another image
18 Blackfriars Street, The Babbity Bowster				55°51′31″N 4°14′34″W	Category B	32625	Upload Photo
3 Victoria Circus, (Cairndowan), And Gatepiers				55°52′44″N 4°18′00″W	Category B	32589	Upload Photo
69 Hyndland Road, St Brides Episcopal Church				55°52′48″N 4°18′17″W	Category B	32531	Upload another image See more images
1, 3 Kingsborough Gardens				55°52′45″N 4°18′18″W	Category B	32540	Upload Photo
730 Great Western Road; Botanic Gardens, Gates At Queen Margaret Drive, Gates At Kirklee Quadrant And Boundary Railings				55°52′41″N 4°17′23″W	Category B	32511	Upload Photo
183 Prospecthill Road, Mount Florida Clinic				55°49′41″N 4°15′36″W	Category B	32437	Upload another image See more images
2-8 (Even Nos) Queen Mary Avenue				55°50′00″N 4°15′49″W	Category C(S)	32440	Upload another image See more images
Queen's Park Glass Houses				55°49′44″N 4°16′15″W	Category B	32409	Upload another image See more images
34 Cathkin Road Including Gatepiers				55°49′30″N 4°16′21″W	Category B	32367	Upload another image See more images
Marywood Square Lamp Standard In Front Of No 55				55°50′10″N 4°16′35″W	Category B	32380	Upload another image See more images
Nithsdale Drive And Nithsdale Street, K6 Telephone Kiosk				55°50′15″N 4°16′20″W	Category B	32392	Upload Photo
16-22 (Even Nos) Beaconsfield Road, St John's Renfield Church, Church Of Scotland, Halls And Church Officer's House				55°53′10″N 4°18′22″W	Category B	32301	Upload another image
1 Cleveden Crescent And Cleveden Crescent Lane, Gatepiers, Boundary And Retaining Walls				55°53′03″N 4°18′12″W	Category B	32304	Upload Photo
5 Cleveden Road, Boundary Walls And Gatepiers				55°53′00″N 4°18′11″W	Category B	32314	Upload Photo
1093 Great Western Road, 3 Whittingehame Gardens				55°53′10″N 4°18′56″W	Category C(S)	32324	Upload Photo
76 Southbrae Drive, Jordanhill College Of Education				55°53′05″N 4°20′24″W	Category B	32339	Upload Photo
1996 Great Western Road, Knightswood Cross, Knightswood Road, St Margaret's Church (Church Of Scotland)				55°53′43″N 4°20′30″W	Category B	32274	Upload Photo
739 South Street, North British Engine Works				55°52′23″N 4°20′40″W	Category A	32280	Upload Photo
21 Westland Drive				55°52′40″N 4°20′23″W	Category B	32285	Upload Photo
9 University Avenue Gilmorehill Hall				55°52′20″N 4°17′04″W	Category B	32251	Upload another image
32, 34, 36, 44, 46, 48, 50 Woodlands Road				55°52′06″N 4°16′20″W	Category B	32264	Upload Photo
8-12 Even Nos Glasgow Street And 18 Bank Street				55°52′29″N 4°17′00″W	Category B	32194	Upload Photo
Kelvingrove Park, Stewart Memorial Fountain				55°52′05″N 4°17′02″W	Category A	32213	Upload another image
29 And 30 Lansdowne Crescent And 393 North Woodside Road				55°52′31″N 4°16′37″W	Category C(S)	32216	Upload Photo
Dumbarton Road, Whiteinch, St Paul's Roman Catholic Church Including Boundary Walls, Gatepiers, Gates And Railings				55°52′26″N 4°20′18″W	Category B	48412	Upload Photo
300 Cathedral Street, Charles Oakley Campus, Central College Of Commerce				55°51′48″N 4°14′51″W	Category B	48413	Upload another image See more images
Willowbank Street, Willowbank Primary School Including Boundary Wall, Gatepiers, Railings And Gates				55°52′17″N 4°16′30″W	Category C(S)	48628	Upload Photo
52-62 (Even Nos) Renfield Street, Odeon Cinema And Shops				55°51′46″N 4°15′21″W	Category B	49233	Upload another image
101 Carstairs Street, Laird Business Park (Former Glasgow Cotton Spinning Co Mill)				55°50′22″N 4°13′13″W	Category B	49924	Upload Photo
143 Oxford Street				55°51′13″N 4°15′29″W	Category C(S)	49933	Upload Photo
722 Cumbernauld Road, Nb Leisure Bingo, Former Riddrie Picture House Including Sweet Shop And Power House				55°51′51″N 4°11′47″W	Category B	51104	Upload Photo
Langside Synagogue					Category C	52561	Upload Photo

== Key ==
The scheme for classifying buildings in Scotland is:

- Category A: "buildings of national or international importance, either architectural or historic; or fine, little-altered examples of some particular period, style or building type."
- Category B: "buildings of regional or more than local importance; or major examples of some particular period, style or building type, which may have been altered."
- Category C: "buildings of local importance; lesser examples of any period, style, or building type, as originally constructed or moderately altered; and simple traditional buildings which group well with other listed buildings."

In March 2016 there were 47,288 listed buildings in Scotland. Of these, 8% were Category A, and 50% were Category B, with the remaining 42% being Category C.

== See also ==
- List of listed buildings in Glasgow
