= Gladstone (disambiguation) =

William Ewart Gladstone (1809–1898) was a British Liberal and earlier conservative politician, and four-time prime minister.

Gladstone may also refer to:

== People ==
- Gladstone baronets, members of the extended family of William Ewart Gladstone

=== Persons ===
- Gladstone (surname)
- Gladstone Small (born 1961), Warwickshire and England cricketer
- Gladstone (footballer), Brazilian footballer Gladstone Pereira della Valentina (born 1985)

=== Fictional characters ===
- Gladstone Gander, a Disney character, cousin of Donald Duck
- Joey Gladstone, one of the main characters on TV series Full House
- Mr. Gladstone, a pseudonym taken by character Benjamin Braddock in the film The Graduate (1967)
- William Gladstone, a character in Jonathan Stroud's Bartimaeus series, loosely based on William Ewart Gladstone

=== Figures ===
- Gladstone (cat), a cat who served as the resident Chief Mouser of HM Treasury

== Places ==
=== Australia ===
- Gladstone, New South Wales, in Raleigh County
- Gladstone, Queensland
  - Gladstone Region, a Queensland Local Government Area
  - City of Gladstone, a former Queensland Local Government Area
  - Electoral district of Gladstone, a Queensland Legislative Assembly electoral district
  - Gladstone Harbour, Queensland
- Gladstone, South Australia
- Gladstone, Tasmania, a small town in north-east Tasmania
- County of Gladstone (Northern Territory), a cadastral unit
- County of Gladstone, a cadastral unit in Victoria

=== Canada ===
- Gladstone, Manitoba
- Gladstone, Ontario, a community
- Gladstone Parish, New Brunswick

=== New Zealand ===
- Gladstone, Invercargill, a suburb of Invercargill and a former borough
- Gladstone, New Zealand, an area in the Carterton district in the North Island
- Gladstone (New Zealand electorate), an electorate in the Canterbury region

=== United Kingdom ===
- Gladstone Park, London, a large park in Brent, London

=== United States ===
- Gladstone, California, a former settlement (1887), now part of Azusa
- Gladstone, Illinois
- Gladstone, Michigan
- Gladstone, Missouri
- Gladstone, Nebraska
- Gladstone, New Jersey
- Gladstone, New Mexico
- Gladstone, North Dakota
- Gladstone, Ohio
- Gladstone, Oregon
- Gladstone, Virginia
- Gladstone Peak, Colorado

== Facilities, structures, infrastructure ==
- Gladstone Hotel (disambiguation)
- Gladstone House (disambiguation)
- Gladstone station (disambiguation), stations of the name
- Gladstone Power Station, Callemondah, Gladstone, Queensland, Australia; a coal-fired electric power station
- The Gladstone Arms, a public house in Southwark, England
- Gladstone Pottery Museum, a working pottery museum in Stoke-on-Trent, England
- Gladstone Secondary School, a public secondary school in Vancouver, British Columbia
- Gladstone railway line, a former railway line in South Australia
- Gladstone Branch, a New Jersey Transit commuter rail line

== Groups, organizations, companies ==
- Gladstone, an ABC/Dunhill Records 1970s rock band from Tyler, Texas
- Gladstone Publishing, publisher of Disney Comics in the 1980s and 1990s
- Gladstone Institutes, biomedical research organisation

== Other uses ==
- Gladstone bag, a type of suitcase with flexible sides and a rigid frame
- HMAS Gladstone, two ships of the Australian navy
- Gladstone class or LB&SCR B1 class, a series of steam locomotives in the 1880s

== See also ==
- Gladstones (disambiguation)
