= List of listed buildings in Glasgow/5 =

This is a list of listed buildings in Glasgow, Scotland.

== List ==
Name	Location	Date Listed	Grid Ref. (Note: Sometimes known as OSGB36, the grid reference (where provided) is based on the British national grid reference system used by the Ordnance Survey. • "Guide to National Grid". Ordnance Survey. • "Get-a-map". Ordnance Survey.)	Geo-coordinates	Notes	LB Number (Note: Historic Environment Scotland assign a unique alphanumeric identifier to each designated site in Scotland, for listed buildings this always begins with "LB", for example "LB12345".)	Image
55-61 (Odd Nos) Buchanan Street (Known As 59 Buchanan Street)				55°51′34″N 4°15′18″W	Category B	32993	Upload Photo
83, 85 Buchanan Street And 6 Mitchell Lane				55°51′35″N 4°15′17″W	Category B	32996	Upload Photo
249 Buchanan Street And 1-7 (Odd Nos) Sauchiehall Street "Cleland Testimonial Building"				55°51′51″N 4°15′12″W	Category B	33006	Upload Photo
39 Elmbank Crescent, Scottish Opera				55°51′51″N 4°16′07″W	Category B	33020	Upload Photo
1H Gilmorehill, University of Glasgow, Materia Medica And Physiology Building				55°52′15″N 4°17′33″W	Category B	32924	Upload another image
1L Gilmorehill, University of Glasgow, Zoology Building				55°52′17″N 4°17′35″W	Category A	32928	Upload another image
2-10 (Inclusive Nos) University Gardens				55°52′23″N 4°17′25″W	Category A	32931	Upload another image
14 University Gardens				55°52′24″N 4°17′27″W	Category A	32933	Upload another image
217-221 (Odd Nos) Argyle Street				55°51′29″N 4°15′27″W	Category B	32938	Upload Photo
335-345 (Odd Nos) Argyle Street And 80-92 (Even Nos) York Street				55°51′31″N 4°15′44″W	Category B	32940	Upload Photo
134-156 (Even Nos) Argyle Street, 2-6 (Even Nos) Mitchell Street And 3-7 (Odd Nos) Buchanan Street				55°51′30″N 4°15′20″W	Category B	32948	Upload another image See more images
752-756 (Even Nos) Argyle Street And 3, 5, 7 Shaftesbury Street, Savings Bank of Glasgow				55°51′43″N 4°16′27″W	Category A	32953	Upload another image
1102-1114 (Even Nos) Argyle Street And 3, 9 Kelvingrove Street				55°51′54″N 4°17′05″W	Category B	32955	Upload Photo
1264-1278 (Even Nos) Argyle Street And 5-13 (Odd Nos) Radnor Street				55°52′00″N 4°17′23″W	Category B	32956	Upload Photo
119, 121, Bath Street				55°51′50″N 4°15′35″W	Category B	32957	Upload Photo
51-59 (Odd Nos) Partickhill Road				55°52′27″N 4°18′31″W	Category B	32890	Upload Photo
56 Partickhill Road 'Woodbank', Carriage House, Arch To Service Court, Retaining Walls And Cast-Iron Gates				55°52′28″N 4°18′31″W	Category A	32895	Upload Photo
64, 66 Partickhill Road				55°52′30″N 4°18′34″W	Category C(S)	32897	Upload Photo
1-9 (Inclusive Nos) Ruskin Terrace, 1, 1A, 3 Hamilton Park Avenue				55°52′35″N 4°17′01″W	Category A	32903	Upload Photo
10-18 (Inclusive Nos) Ruskin Terrace, 2, 4, Ruskin Place				55°52′36″N 4°17′05″W	Category B	32904	Upload Photo
1 Gilmorehill, University of Glasgow, Main Block: Quadrangles, Bute Hall, Randolph Hall, Hunterian Museum, Library				55°52′19″N 4°17′20″W	Category A	32913	Upload another image
360-392 (Even Nos) Dumbarton Road, 4-8 (Even Nos) Peel Street, 1-13 (Odd Nos) Fortrose Street And 1 Burgh Hall Street				55°52′15″N 4°18′30″W	Category B	32861	Upload Photo
305 Dumbarton Road, Partick District Library				55°52′14″N 4°18′17″W	Category C(S)	32864	Upload another image See more images
65-73 (Odd Nos) Highburgh Road				55°52′28″N 4°18′06″W	Category B	32877	Upload Photo
46-50 (Even Nos) Hyndland Street, St Peter's Rc Church And Presbytery				55°52′21″N 4°18′06″W	Category B	32880	Upload Photo
34-38 (Even Nos) West George Street And 1 And 1A Dundas Street				55°51′43″N 4°15′10″W	Category B	32801	Upload another image
54-64 Wilson Street With 60-62 (Even Nos) Glassford Street And 69 Hutcheson Street				55°51′32″N 4°14′55″W	Category B	32808	Upload Photo
Buchanan Street, At Royal Bank Place, Police Box				55°51′38″N 4°15′15″W	Category B	32825	Upload another image
1-29 (Odd Nos) And 2-40 (Even Nos) Royal Exchange Square With 145-147 (Odd Nos) Queen Street And Archways				55°51′38″N 4°15′08″W	Category A	32826	Upload Photo
St Enoch Square Travel Centre, Formerly St Enoch Underground Station				55°51′27″N 4°15′19″W	Category A	32833	Upload another image See more images
201 St James Road, Allan Glen's Secondary School Annexe, With Gatepiers Railings And 195 St James Road (Janitor's House)				55°51′53″N 4°14′38″W	Category C(S)	32834	Upload Photo
11-27 (Odd Nos) Saltmarket				55°51′22″N 4°14′38″W	Category B	32842	Upload Photo
5-27 (Odd Nos) Ashton Road				55°52′27″N 4°17′38″W	Category B	32846	Upload another image
1-8 (Inclusive Nos) Belgrave Terrace, 2 Oakfield Avenue And 1, 3 Southpark Avenue				55°52′33″N 4°17′03″W	Category B	32848	Upload Photo
7, 9 Buckingham Street				55°52′40″N 4°17′16″W	Category C(S)	32849	Upload Photo
64-70 (Even Nos) Howard Street				55°51′23″N 4°15′16″W	Category C(S)	32726	Upload Photo
115-137 (Odd Nos) Ingram Street And 118-128 (Even Nos) Brunswick Street				55°51′34″N 4°14′45″W	Category B	32732	Upload Photo
56-64 (Even Nos) Ingram Street, And 132 Albion Street, Albion Buildings				55°51′34″N 4°14′37″W	Category B	32739	Upload Photo
124-140 (Even Nos) Ingram Street				55°51′35″N 4°14′48″W	Category B	32742	Upload Photo
170-176 (Even Nos) Ingram Street				55°51′36″N 4°14′54″W	Category B	32746	Upload Photo
3-11 (Odd Nos) James Morrison Street And 74-76 (Even Nos) London Road				55°51′20″N 4°14′33″W	Category B	32748	Upload another image
9-17 (Odd Nos) John Street And 47 Cochrane Street				55°51′36″N 4°14′53″W	Category B	32750	Upload Photo
84-92 (Even Nos) Miller Street				55°51′35″N 4°15′02″W	Category B	32763	Upload Photo
133-155 (Odd Nos) Stockwell Street, 128-138 (Even Nos) Bridgegate And 1-3 (Odd Nos) Aird's Lane				55°51′18″N 4°15′00″W	Category B	32767	Upload Photo
73-75 (Odd Nos) Trongate				55°51′25″N 4°14′45″W	Category C(S)	32770	Upload Photo
97-101 Trongate				55°51′25″N 4°14′48″W	Category B	32772	Upload Photo
100-104 (Even Nos) Trongate				55°51′26″N 4°14′45″W	Category B	32784	Upload another image
170-174 (Even Nos) Trongate And 10 Hutcheson Street				55°51′27″N 4°14′53″W	Category B	32788	Upload Photo
Virginia Street, Virginia Court (Rear Of 37-47)				55°51′32″N 4°15′01″W	Category B	32794	Upload Photo
70 Cathedral Square, Glasgow Cathedral And Cathedral Graveyard, Boundary Walls And Railings				55°51′50″N 4°14′04″W	Category A	32654	Upload another image See more images
Cathedral Square, Statue Of James Arthur				55°51′46″N 4°14′10″W	Category B	32656	Upload another image
Cathedral Square, Statue To Reverend Norman Macleod				55°51′43″N 4°14′11″W	Category B	32661	Upload another image
60 Fox Street				55°51′23″N 4°15′18″W	Category B	32681	Upload Photo
5 Garth Street With 79-83 (Odd Nos) Hutcheson Street				55°51′33″N 4°14′53″W	Category C(S)	32682	Upload Photo
11 George Square, Monteith House				55°51′38″N 4°15′04″W	Category B	32687	Upload Photo
40 George Square, Millennium (Formerly North British) Hotel				55°51′42″N 4°15′01″W	Category B	32690	Upload another image
187 George Street, Montrose House				55°51′39″N 4°14′41″W	Category B	32707	Upload Photo
119-129 High Street				55°51′31″N 4°14′32″W	Category B	32721	Upload Photo
215 High Street And 7-9 (Odd Nos) Nicholas Street				55°51′36″N 4°14′26″W	Category B	32722	Upload another image
235-287 (Odd Nos) High Street, (Bell O'The Brae Tenements)				55°51′39″N 4°14′20″W	Category B	32723	Upload another image
65-117 (Odd Nos) Argyle Street, Known As No 65 Argyle Street, Former Lewis's Department Store				55°51′28″N 4°15′10″W	Category B	32609	Upload another image
59-83 (Odd Nos) Bell Street And 6 Walls Street Known As 59 Bell Street				55°51′29″N 4°14′36″W	Category B	32621	Upload Photo
74 Brunswick Street And Return Elevation To Wilson Street				55°51′30″N 4°14′49″W	Category C(S)	32626	Upload Photo
108-114 (Even Nos) Brunswick Street And 87-99 (Odd Nos) Candleriggs				55°51′33″N 4°14′48″W	Category B	32628	Upload Photo
12 Buchanan Street				55°51′31″N 4°15′16″W	Category B	32630	Upload Photo
60-62 (Even Nos) Buchanan Street				55°51′34″N 4°15′15″W	Category A	32635	Upload another image
92-100 (Even Nos) Buchanan Street, Known As 98 Buchanan Street				55°51′37″N 4°15′14″W	Category A	32639	Upload another image
1 Victoria Circus (Thorncliffe)				55°52′44″N 4°17′58″W	Category B	32588	Upload Photo
35-37 (Odd Nos) Victoria Crescent Road, (Kings Gate)				55°52′34″N 4°17′53″W	Category B	32596	Upload Photo
10-16 (Even Nos) Kingsborough Gardens				55°52′47″N 4°18′14″W	Category B	32543	Upload Photo
1-7 (Inclusive Nos) Kirklee Gardens And Gatepiers				55°53′00″N 4°17′45″W	Category B	32547	Upload Photo
2, 2A And 4 Lorraine Road				55°52′48″N 4°18′05″W	Category C(S)	32561	Upload Photo
10 Lowther Terrace, With Gatepiers And Railings, Great Western Road				55°52′53″N 4°17′56″W	Category A	32564	Upload Photo
3-13 (Odd Nos) Mirrlees Drive				55°52′56″N 4°17′47″W	Category B	32566	Upload Photo
4, 4A And 6 Prince Albert Road And Gatepiers				55°52′39″N 4°18′07″W	Category B	32573	Upload Photo
1-7 (Inclusive Nos) Hughenden Terrace, Hughenden Road Boundary Walls And 5 And 6 Montague Lane				55°52′53″N 4°18′22″W	Category B	32527	Upload Photo
5-11 (Odd Nos) Kingsborough Gardens				55°52′44″N 4°18′18″W	Category B	32541	Upload Photo
1-5 (Inclusive Nos) Devonshire Gardens, With Boundary Walls And Gatepiers, Great Western Road				55°52′56″N 4°18′15″W	Category B	32495	Upload Photo
78-104 (Even Nos) Dowanhill Street And 38-40 (Even Nos) Highburgh Road				55°52′29″N 4°17′56″W	Category B	32498	Upload Photo
45-55 (Odd Nos) Dowanside Road And 106 Dowanhill Street				55°52′31″N 4°17′54″W	Category B	32499	Upload Photo
57-67 (Odd Nos) Dowanside Road And 115, Dowanhill Street				55°52′32″N 4°17′58″W	Category B	32500	Upload Photo
3 Dundonald Road (Bennochy Lodge) And Gatepiers				55°52′42″N 4°17′52″W	Category B	32505	Upload Photo
5-13 (Odd Nos) Dundonald Road, With Retaining Wall And Railings				55°52′42″N 4°17′52″W	Category B	32506	Upload Photo
1 And 2 Grosvenor Crescent				55°52′41″N 4°17′34″W	Category B	32518	Upload Photo
5-9 (Odd Nos) Bellshaugh Road And 1 And 1A Mirrlees Drive				55°52′57″N 4°17′46″W	Category C(S)	32477	Upload Photo
1-7 (Inclusive Nos) Bowmont Gardens, R C Training College				55°52′40″N 4°17′53″W	Category B	32478	Upload Photo
3 And 3A Cleveden Drive				55°53′01″N 4°17′50″W	Category B	32482	Upload Photo
2-10 (Even Nos) Cleveden Drive, 31 Cleveden Drive Lane And Former 11 Bellshaugh Road (Now Linked To 2 Mirrlees Drive) With Gatepiers Boundary And Retaining Walls				55°52′59″N 4°17′48″W	Category C(S)	32483	Upload Photo
15 Cleveden Gardens With Garage, Gatepiers, Gates, Walls And Railings				55°53′05″N 4°17′59″W	Category A	32486	Upload Photo
5-9 (Odd Nos) Crown Road South				55°52′32″N 4°18′00″W	Category C(S)	32492	Upload Photo
353, 357 And 361 Langside Road				55°50′01″N 4°15′49″W	Category B	32435	Upload another image See more images
3-11 (Odd Nos) Queen Mary Avenue Including Gatepiers				55°50′00″N 4°15′45″W	Category B	32439	Upload another image See more images
34-34A Queen Mary Avenue Crosshill				55°49′58″N 4°15′41″W	Category B	32441	Upload another image See more images
40 And 40A Queen Mary Avenue				55°49′57″N 4°15′39″W	Category C(S)	32442	Upload another image See more images
400, 404, 408 Victoria Road, 124, Allison Street				55°50′11″N 4°15′54″W	Category B	32464	Upload another image See more images
794-802 (Even Nos) Pollokshaws Road, 1 Regent Park Square And 2 Queen Square				55°50′09″N 4°16′19″W	Category B	32404	Upload another image See more images
178 Queen's Drive, Queens Park Baptist Church And Hall				55°50′08″N 4°16′14″W	Category B	32408	Upload another image See more images
23-45 (Odd Nos) Albert Road, 318, 320 Langside Road				55°50′05″N 4°15′52″W	Category B	32416	Upload another image See more images
34-50 (Even Nos) Albert Road				55°50′03″N 4°15′51″W	Category B	32417	Upload another image See more images
17 Shakespeare Street, Ruchill Parish Church Halls And Janitor's House				55°53′12″N 4°17′02″W	Category A	32356	Upload another image See more images
57, 59, 61 Cathkin Road Including Perimeter Walls And Gatepiers				55°49′25″N 4°16′32″W	Category B	32366	Upload another image See more images
Marywood Square Lamp Standard In Front Of No 23				55°50′07″N 4°16′29″W	Category B	32377	Upload another image See more images
Marywood Square Lamp Standard In Front Of No 40				55°50′09″N 4°16′32″W	Category B	32381	Upload another image See more images
Marywood Square Lamp Standard In Front Of No 50				55°50′10″N 4°16′34″W	Category B	32382	Upload Photo
40, 40A-46 (Even Nos) Millbrae Crescent				55°49′21″N 4°16′28″W	Category B	32385	Upload Photo
11-17 And 17A (Inclusive Nos) Moray Place				55°50′13″N 4°16′28″W	Category B	32387	Upload another image See more images
27-33 (Inclusive Nos) Moray Place And 57 Marywood Square				55°50′10″N 4°16′37″W	Category B	32389	Upload another image See more images
697 Pollokshaws Road, 5 Torrisdale Street, Bank Of Scotland Building				55°50′10″N 4°16′12″W	Category B	32398	Upload another image See more images
425, 427 Crow Road				55°52′47″N 4°19′31″W	Category C(S)	32295	Upload Photo
28 ,30A, 30B, 30C, 32, 32A And 32B Victoria Park Gardens South, Broomhill Trinity Congregational Church And Halls				55°52′38″N 4°19′32″W	Category B	32298	Upload Photo
1097 Great Western Road, 5 Whittingehame Gardens				55°53′11″N 4°18′58″W	Category C(S)	32326	Upload Photo
1101 Great Western Road, 7 Whittingehame Gardens				55°53′12″N 4°19′00″W	Category C(S)	32328	Upload Photo
1000 Great Western Road, Glasgow Homoeopathic Hospital, Gatepiers And Retaining Walls				55°53′02″N 4°18′22″W	Category B	32335	Upload Photo
55 Mitre Road				55°52′46″N 4°19′47″W	Category C(S)	32338	Upload Photo
11 Whittinghame Drive, Garden Walls And Gatepiers				55°53′05″N 4°18′54″W	Category A	32342	Upload Photo
1508 Maryhill Road, Maryhill Public Library				55°53′29″N 4°17′26″W	Category B	32352	Upload Photo
1-8 Kingfisher Gardens, Former Glasgow University Sports Pavilion				55°53′43″N 4°21′59″W	Category C(S)	32275	Upload Photo
19 Westland Drive, Whiteinch Homes				55°52′38″N 4°20′24″W	Category B	32284	Upload Photo
23-41 (Odd Nos) Broomhill Drive And 1-15 (Odd Nos) Broomhill Avenue, With Gatepiers And Low Boundary Wall				55°52′20″N 4°19′24″W	Category C(S)	32289	Upload Photo
137-159 (Odd Nos) Broomhill Drive				55°52′34″N 4°19′18″W	Category B	32290	Upload Photo
6-10 (Inclusive) Broomhill Gardens				55°52′32″N 4°19′16″W	Category B	32292	Upload Photo
3-13 (Odd Nos) Crow Road And 482-492 (Even Nos) Dumbarton Road				55°52′15″N 4°18′47″W	Category B	32294	Upload Photo
Queen's Crescent Gardens, Ornamental Fountain				55°52′15″N 4°16′15″W	Category B	32248	Upload Photo
24-40 (Even Nos) Westend Park Street				55°52′14″N 4°16′28″W	Category C(S)	32255	Upload Photo
9, 15, 21 Willowbank Street And 192, 194, 206 Woodlands Road				55°52′15″N 4°16′33″W	Category B	32260	Upload Photo
1-11 And 19 (Odd Nos) Lynedoch Street				55°52′06″N 4°16′25″W	Category B	32224	Upload Photo
31-39 (Odd Nos) Oakfield Avenue				55°52′28″N 4°17′04″W	Category B	32234	Upload Photo
1 - 5 (Odd Nos Inclusive) And 4 Park Gate				55°52′10″N 4°16′49″W	Category A	32242	Upload Photo
4-12 (Even Nos) Burnbank Gardens				55°52′25″N 4°16′18″W	Category C(S)	32183	Upload Photo
Eldon Street Bridge Over River Kelvin				55°52′20″N 4°16′53″W	Category B	32188	Upload another image See more images
40-50 (Even Nos) Gibson Street And 84-86 (Even Nos) Otago Street				55°52′22″N 4°16′59″W	Category B	32191	Upload Photo
1-9 (Odd Nos) Great George Street And 78-80 (Even Nos) Otago Street				55°52′23″N 4°16′59″W	Category B	32195	Upload Photo
300 Great Western Road/Holyrood Crescent St Mary's Episcopal Cathedral				55°52′25″N 4°16′30″W	Category A	32198	Upload another image
Kelvingrove Park Gateway To Kelvingrove Street				55°52′01″N 4°17′01″W	Category C(S)	32208	Upload Photo
Kelvingrove Park, South African War Memorial				55°52′13″N 4°17′02″W	Category B	32212	Upload another image
33-43 (Inclusive Nos) Lansdowne Crescent And 388-400 (Even Nos) Great Western Road				55°52′28″N 4°16′38″W	Category B	32218	Upload Photo
44 Ashley Street Woodside Public School, Albany Annexe				55°52′12″N 4°16′20″W	Category B	32175	Upload Photo
3-27 (Odd Nos) Bank Street				55°52′30″N 4°16′57″W	Category B	32177	Upload another image
6-16 (Even Nos) Bank Street				55°52′31″N 4°16′58″W	Category B	32179	Upload Photo
86- 90 Saracen Street, St Teresa's Roman Catholic Church And Presbytery Including Gateways, Boundary Walls, Railings, Steps And Piers				55°52′48″N 4°15′08″W	Category B	45981	Upload Photo
Property To Rear Of 100 Brunswick Street, 85 Candleriggs Patrick Thomas Court				55°51′31″N 4°14′47″W	Category B	46590	Upload Photo
19 And 21 Aytoun Road With Conservatory				55°50′32″N 4°16′55″W	Category B	47412	Upload another image See more images
70 Hyndland Road, Edward Viii Pillar Box				55°52′47″N 4°18′20″W	Category B	48024	Upload Photo
La Belle Place, Kelvingrove Park Public Convenience And Shelter (Opposite Royal Terrace)				55°52′01″N 4°16′49″W	Category C(S)	48833	Upload Photo
520 Sauchiehall Street And 341 Renfrew Street Including Lamp Posts				55°51′59″N 4°16′11″W	Category B	49921	Upload Photo
61 Bridge Street				55°51′11″N 4°15′30″W	Category B	49930	Upload Photo
4 Rogart Street, Glasgow Metropolitan College, Rogart Street Campus, (Former Mavor & Coulson Stores Building)				55°51′04″N 4°13′32″W	Category C(S)	51735	Upload Photo
Glencairn Drive, Titwood Bowling Clubhouse				55°50′18″N 4°16′57″W	Category C(S)	44655	Upload Photo
Applecross Street, Forth And Clyde Canal Workshops				55°52′38″N 4°15′42″W	Category B	44020	Upload Photo
859 And 869 Crow Road, Temple Anniesland Parish Church (Church Of Scotland) With Hall, Gatepiers, Boundary Walls And Railings				55°53′28″N 4°19′29″W	Category B	43035	Upload Photo

== Key ==
The scheme for classifying buildings in Scotland is:

- Category A: "buildings of national or international importance, either architectural or historic; or fine, little-altered examples of some particular period, style or building type."
- Category B: "buildings of regional or more than local importance; or major examples of some particular period, style or building type, which may have been altered."
- Category C: "buildings of local importance; lesser examples of any period, style, or building type, as originally constructed or moderately altered; and simple traditional buildings which group well with other listed buildings."

In March 2016 there were 47,288 listed buildings in Scotland. Of these, 8% were Category A, and 50% were Category B, with the remaining 42% being Category C.

== See also ==
- List of listed buildings in Glasgow
