= List of listed buildings in Glasgow =

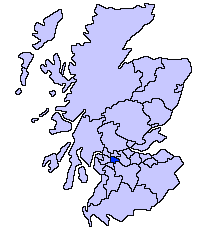
Glasgow shown within Scotland

This is a list of listed buildings in Glasgow. The list is split out in smaller parts.

- List of listed buildings in Glasgow/1
- List of listed buildings in Glasgow/2
- List of listed buildings in Glasgow/3
- List of listed buildings in Glasgow/4
- List of listed buildings in Glasgow/5
- List of listed buildings in Glasgow/6
- List of listed buildings in Glasgow/7
- List of listed buildings in Glasgow/8
- List of listed buildings in Glasgow/9
- List of listed buildings in Glasgow/10
- List of listed buildings in Glasgow/11
- List of listed buildings in Glasgow/12
- List of listed buildings in Glasgow/13

== See also ==
- Scheduled monuments in Glasgow
- List of Category A listed buildings in Glasgow
