= Gladstones =

Gladstones may refer to:

- Sir John Gladstone, 1st Baronet (born Gladstones, 1764–1851), Scottish politician and son of Thomas
- Gladstones Malibu, an American seafood restaurant commonly referred to as Gladstones
- The Gladstones, a working title for the TV series The Flintstones

== See also ==
- Gladstone (disambiguation)
