= Gladstone station =

Gladstone station may refer to:

== Rail ==
- Gladstone station (NJ Transit), in Peapack-Gladstone, New Jersey, USA
- Gladstone station (SEPTA), in Lansdowne, Pennsylvania, USA
- Gladstone station (Manitoba), in Gladstone, Manitoba, Canada
- Gladstone station (Ottawa), in Ottawa, Ontario, Canada
- Gladstone railway station, Queensland, in Gladstone, Queensland, Australia
- Gladstone railway station, South Australia, Gladstone, South Australia, Australia

== Other ==
- Gladstone Power Station, in Gladstone, Queensland, Australia

== See also ==
- Gladstone Park station, Gladstone Park, Chicago, Illinois, USA; a rail transit station
- Gladstone (disambiguation)
