= List of listed buildings in Glasgow/7 =

This is a list of listed buildings in Glasgow, Scotland.

== List ==
Name	Location	Date Listed	Grid Ref. (Note: Sometimes known as OSGB36, the grid reference (where provided) is based on the British national grid reference system used by the Ordnance Survey. • "Guide to National Grid". Ordnance Survey. • "Get-a-map". Ordnance Survey.)	Geo-coordinates	Notes	LB Number (Note: Historic Environment Scotland assign a unique alphanumeric identifier to each designated site in Scotland, for listed buildings this always begins with "LB", for example "LB12345".)	Image
2 Lancaster Crescent, 2 Lancaster Crescent Lane; Great Western Road				55°52′57″N 4°18′09″W	Category B	32555	Upload Photo
1-3 (Inclusive Nos) Lancaster Terrace And Gatepiers, Great Western Road				55°52′54″N 4°18′10″W	Category B	32558	Upload Photo
14-16 (Even Nos) Mirrlees Drive And 18-20 (Even Nos) Mirrlees Drive				55°52′56″N 4°17′51″W	Category C(S)	32569	Upload Photo
124 Observatory Road, Elmslea				55°52′42″N 4°17′49″W	Category B	32570	Upload Photo
2-8 (Even Nos) Kensington Road And Boundary Walls				55°52′47″N 4°18′01″W	Category B	32538	Upload Photo
2-14 (Even Nos) Dowanside Road				55°52′30″N 4°17′41″W	Category C(S)	32501	Upload Photo
27-29 (Odd Nos) Dundonald Road, St Lukes Greek Orthodox Cathedral				55°52′45″N 4°17′57″W	Category B	32508	Upload another image See more images
985 Great Western Road (Westbourne House) With 11 Hyndland Road With Retaining Walls				55°52′56″N 4°18′12″W	Category B	32516	Upload Photo
1-9 (Inclusive Nos) Bowmont Terrace				55°52′37″N 4°17′50″W	Category B	32481	Upload Photo
Daisy Street, Govanhill Church Of Scotland				55°50′10″N 4°15′31″W	Category B	32430	Upload another image See more images
34 Dixon Avenue, Langside Road, Maxwell Exhibitions Ltd. (Former Crosshill Victoria Church And Hall)				55°50′05″N 4°15′46″W	Category B	32431	Upload Photo
120-142 (Even Nos) Queen's Drive, 538-540 (Even Nos) Victoria Road And 3, 5 Maybank Street Including Railings				55°50′03″N 4°16′02″W	Category B	32454	Upload another image See more images
170 Queen's Drive And Albert Avenue, Strathbungo Queen's Park Church Including Hall				55°50′05″N 4°16′10″W	Category B	32457	Upload another image See more images
401-407 (Odd Nos) Victoria Road, Allison Street, Victoria Cross Building				55°50′11″N 4°15′52″W	Category B	32459	Upload another image See more images
Victoria Road Gateway To Queen's Park Including Gatepiers Gates And Railings				55°50′00″N 4°15′57″W	Category B	32414	Upload another image See more images
84 Albert Road Sunnybank				55°50′01″N 4°15′41″W	Category B	32421	Upload another image See more images
83 Craigie Street, St Bride's Primary School, Former Strathbungo Public School Including Janitor's Lodge Gatepiers And Railings				55°50′12″N 4°15′59″W	Category B	32428	Upload another image See more images
Battle Place, Battlefield Monument				55°49′40″N 4°16′14″W	Category B	32360	Upload another image See more images
55 Battlefield Road, Grange Road Battlefield Rest				55°49′38″N 4°15′59″W	Category B	32361	Upload another image See more images
1 Langside Avenue, Langside Hall				55°49′53″N 4°16′39″W	Category A	32369	Upload another image
Millbrae Bridge (Langside Drive - Millbrae Road Over White Cart Water)				55°49′20″N 4°16′39″W	Category B	32383	Upload Photo
41 Nithsdale Drive, Nithsdale Hall Including Gatepiers				55°50′16″N 4°16′10″W	Category B	32390	Upload Photo
11-69 (Odd Nos) Nithsdale Road				55°50′11″N 4°16′17″W	Category B	32393	Upload another image See more images
40-46 (Even Nos) Nithsdale Street				55°50′15″N 4°16′16″W	Category C(S)	32396	Upload Photo
64 Randolph Road, Marlborough Avenue, 4 Rowallan Lane, Broomhill Church And Halls (Church Of Scotland)				55°52′41″N 4°19′14″W	Category C(S)	32296	Upload Photo
3 And 5 Arnwood Drive (Westwood And St Brendan)				55°53′08″N 4°19′03″W	Category B	32300	Upload Photo
45 Chamberlain Road, Jordanhill Training College Demonstration School, Lodge, Gates, Gatepiers And Quadrant Walls				55°53′06″N 4°20′01″W	Category B	32303	Upload Photo
50 Cleveden Drive Boundary Walls And Gatepiers				55°53′02″N 4°18′16″W	Category B	32307	Upload Photo
52 Cleveden Drive, Boundary Walls And Gatepiers				55°53′03″N 4°18′18″W	Category B	32308	Upload Photo
56 Cleveden Drive "Westmount", Boundary Walls And Gatepiers				55°53′04″N 4°18′21″W	Category B	32310	Upload Photo
1055 Great Western Road, Gartnavel Royal Hospital Chapel				55°53′02″N 4°19′01″W	Category B	32320	Upload Photo
1105 Great Western Road, 9 Whittingehame Gardens				55°53′13″N 4°19′03″W	Category C(S)	32330	Upload Photo
1107 Great Western Road, 10 Whittingehame Gardens				55°53′13″N 4°19′04″W	Category C(S)	32331	Upload Photo
998 Great Western Road, St Mungos Academy Centenary Club, Garage, Service Block, Gatepiers And Retaining Walls				55°53′01″N 4°18′17″W	Category A	32334	Upload Photo
9 Winton Drive, Winton Lodge And Gatepiers				55°53′09″N 4°18′08″W	Category B	32343	Upload Photo
28 Woodend Drive Jordanhill Parish Church, Church Of Scotland				55°53′07″N 4°19′45″W	Category B	32347	Upload Photo
24 Gairbraid Avenue, Former Police Station				55°53′26″N 4°17′28″W	Category B	32350	Upload Photo
21 Jardine Street, Lanarkshire Regiment Drill Hall				55°52′37″N 4°16′38″W	Category B	32272	Upload Photo
739 South Street, Former North British Diesel Engine Engine Works, Quayside Titan Crane				55°52′21″N 4°20′44″W	Category A	32281	Upload another image
2 Broomhill Avenue And 1-3 (Odd Nos) Broomhill Terrace				55°52′22″N 4°19′27″W	Category C(S)	32288	Upload Photo
63, 65, 69, 71, 73, 77, 79, 81, 83, 85, 87, 89 St George's Road And 10, 14, 18, 20, 24 28 Woodlands Road				55°52′04″N 4°16′17″W	Category B	32249	Upload another image
Lynedoch Place/Park Circus Place; Park Church Tower				55°52′07″N 4°16′37″W	Category B	32223	Upload Photo
21-25 (Odd Nos) Glasgow Street				55°52′29″N 4°17′02″W	Category B	32193	Upload Photo
Kelvingrove Park, Roberts Memorial				55°52′13″N 4°16′55″W	Category A	32211	Upload another image See more images
Kelvin Way, Paired Gatepiers To Kelvin Way At University Avenue And Sauchiehall Street				55°52′01″N 4°17′19″W	Category C(S)	32214	Upload another image
753 And 755 Westerhouse Road, St Benedict's Roman Catholic Church And Presbytery				55°52′10″N 4°07′08″W	Category B	32159	Upload another image
10, 14-32 (Even Nos) Queen Mary Avenue, Speirs Place				55°49′59″N 4°15′45″W	Category B	32172	Upload another image See more images
118 And 126-136 (Even Nos) Stanley Street, Former Our Lady And St Margaret's Presbytery And Primary School (Roman Catholic) Including Gatepiers, Gates, Railings And Boundary Wall				55°51′03″N 4°16′50″W	Category C(S)	46279	Upload Photo
316 Caledonia Road, Rutherglen Road, Southern Necropolis Cemetery And Boundary Walls				55°50′37″N 4°14′49″W	Category B	47416	Upload another image
197 Crookston Road, Ross Hall Park, Grotto, Rock Garden, Passage, Retaining Wall, Boat House And Ornamental Paths				55°50′19″N 4°21′48″W	Category B	48282	Upload Photo
39-45 (Odd Nos) Washington Street, Royal Scottish Pipe Band Association Headquarters And College				55°51′29″N 4°16′06″W	Category C(S)	48631	Upload Photo
5 And 7 Horselethill Road, Horselethill House With Conservatory				55°52′43″N 4°17′49″W	Category C(S)	48683	Upload Photo
36-40 Golspie Street & 16 Garmouth Street, Salvation Army Citadel				55°51′47″N 4°19′04″W	Category B	49789	Upload Photo
93 Saracen Street, Former Askit Laboratory And Manufactory Including Boundary Wall				55°52′50″N 4°15′17″W	Category B	49923	Upload Photo
243 Centre Street, Former Telephone Exchange				55°51′04″N 4°15′44″W	Category B	49932	Upload Photo
74 Victoria Crescent Road, Former Dowanside House And Former Notre Dame Training College Wing To East Including Gatepiers, Railings And Boundary Walls				55°52′39″N 4°17′57″W	Category C(S)	50027	Upload Photo
242 Castlemilk Road, King's Park Church Including Gates And Railings				55°49′14″N 4°14′04″W	Category B	50119	Upload another image
30 Havelock Street, Dowanhill Primary School, Including Boundary Walls And Gatepiers				55°52′27″N 4°17′55″W	Category C(S)	50273	Upload Photo
Partick Bridge Over River Kelvin				55°52′11″N 4°17′39″W	Category B	50583	Upload Photo
Albert Drive, Edward Viii Pillar Box				55°50′33″N 4°16′30″W	Category B	50819	Upload Photo
Cathedral Square, Police Box				55°51′44″N 4°14′11″W	Category B	51059	Upload another image
7 Broompark Circus, Broompark Day Nursery Including Boundary Walls And Gatepiers				55°51′44″N 4°13′22″W	Category C(S)	51444	Upload Photo
12 Washington Street, Former Washington Street Public School With Boundary Walls, Gatepiers, Steps And Railings				55°51′32″N 4°16′09″W	Category C(S)	45642	Upload Photo
176-178 (Even Nos) Bath Street				55°51′53″N 4°15′42″W	Category C(S)	44597	Upload Photo
52 Speirs Wharf, Wheatsheaf Building				55°52′28″N 4°15′26″W	Category C(S)	44112	Upload Photo
5 And 7 Wellington Street And 306-314 (Even Nos) Argyle Street				55°51′32″N 4°15′41″W	Category C(S)	43902	Upload Photo
Great Western Road, Anniesland Station Bridge				55°53′20″N 4°19′20″W	Category B	43373	Upload another image See more images
55 Crescent Road, Dunronald With Gate, Railings And Gatepiers				55°53′13″N 4°21′26″W	Category B	43115	Upload Photo
12 Dunterlie Avenue, Knightswood Congregational Church And Hall With Railings And Gates				55°53′24″N 4°21′28″W	Category B	43116	Upload Photo
215 Kinfauns Drive, St Laurence (Martyr) Roman Catholic Church And Presbytery With Boundary Wall, Gates, Gatepiers And Railings				55°54′53″N 4°22′30″W	Category B	43029	Upload Photo
29 Newlands Road, 8 Lubnaig Road, Carradale				55°49′14″N 4°16′52″W	Category B	33946	Upload Photo
14, 16 St Bride`S Road				55°49′18″N 4°17′07″W	Category B	33962	Upload Photo
223 Shawbridge Street, Pollokshaws Parish Church				55°49′18″N 4°17′59″W	Category B	33964	Upload another image
6 Onslow Drive, Day Nursery				55°51′41″N 4°13′14″W	Category C(S)	33903	Upload Photo
2 Auldhouse Court, Thornliebank Road				55°48′59″N 4°18′14″W	Category B	33913	Upload Photo
Ellangowan Road And Haggs Road, Electricity Substation Including Gatepiers And Boundary Wall				55°49′43″N 4°17′43″W	Category B	33922	Upload Photo
351-355 (Odd Nos) Kilmarnock Road And Newlands Road, St Margaret's Episcopal Church And Halls, Including Gates And Railings				55°49′18″N 4°17′11″W	Category B	33926	Upload another image See more images
26 Langside Avenue And 1041-1043 (Odd Nos) Pollokshaws Road, Marlborough House Including Maxwells				55°49′52″N 4°16′44″W	Category C(S)	33928	Upload Photo
Glasgow Green, Saltmarket Maclennan Arch				55°51′12″N 4°14′45″W	Category B	33841	Upload another image
14 Monteith Row, Monteith Hotel				55°51′12″N 4°14′15″W	Category B	33854	Upload Photo
18 And 20 Castlefield Court				55°53′03″N 4°10′00″W	Category B	33866	Upload Photo
Gartloch Road, Gartloch Hospital, West Lodge				55°52′54″N 4°06′33″W	Category B	33871	Upload another image
Gartloch Road, Gartloch Hospital, New Nurses Home				55°52′40″N 4°06′39″W	Category B	33872	Upload Photo
1019-1041 (Odd Nos) Cathcart Road And 3 Stanmore Road				55°49′39″N 4°15′32″W	Category C(S)	33799	Upload another image See more images
1123 Cathcart Road, Hampden Drive, Mount Florida Parish Church Including Railings				55°49′33″N 4°15′24″W	Category B	33800	Upload Photo
2-26 (Even Nos) Dalmarnock Road And 1-11 (Odd Nos) Main Street Bridgeton, Bridgeton Cross Mansions				55°50′54″N 4°13′34″W	Category C(S)	33826	Upload Photo
Glasgow Green, Boathouse Nearest Weir And Pipe Bridge				55°51′07″N 4°14′38″W	Category B	33834	Upload Photo
520 Bilsland Drive, Ruchill Hospital, Water Tower				55°53′13″N 4°15′57″W	Category A	33750	Upload Photo
1-6 (Inclusive Nos) Doune Quadrant				55°52′43″N 4°16′55″W	Category C(S)	33760	Upload Photo
251-261 (Odd Nos) Garrioch Road				55°52′57″N 4°17′18″W	Category B	33761	Upload Photo
14 Kelvin Drive And Gatepiers				55°52′50″N 4°17′15″W	Category B	33769	Upload Photo
9 Kelvinside Gardens, St Charles Rc Church				55°52′45″N 4°16′37″W	Category B	33771	Upload Photo
2 Kelvinside Terrace West And 301 Wilton Street With Retaining Walls				55°52′46″N 4°17′02″W	Category B	33773	Upload Photo
405, 407 Cumberland Street, St Francis Church And Presbytery				55°50′47″N 4°14′45″W	Category A	33690	Upload Photo
119 Carmunnock Road, Cathcart Old Parish Church Including Session House, Gates, Gatepiers And Boundary Walls				55°49′05″N 4°15′15″W	Category B	33707	Upload another image
1035 Balmore Road, Lambhill Cemetery, Entrance Arch, Railings And Gates				55°54′09″N 4°16′10″W	Category B	33728	Upload Photo
2064 Maryhill Road				55°53′58″N 4°18′05″W	Category B	33733	Upload Photo
London Road, Belvidere Hospital, Nurses' Home/Administration Block				55°50′42″N 4°12′02″W	Category B	33638	Upload Photo
1147 And 1167 London Road, London Road School Including Lodge, Boundary Walls And Gatepiers				55°50′54″N 4°12′24″W	Category B	33639	Upload Photo
1169 Shettleston Road, Portland Arms Public House				55°51′06″N 4°09′55″W	Category B	33645	Upload Photo
591 Tollcross Road, Tollcross House, Tollcross Park				55°50′47″N 4°10′47″W	Category A	33648	Upload another image
591 Tollcross Road, Tollcross House Conservatory, Tollcross Park				55°50′51″N 4°10′45″W	Category B	33650	Upload Photo
155 Carmyle Avenue, Carmyle Church And Gatepiers, Boundary Walls And Railings				55°49′51″N 4°09′29″W	Category B	33661	Upload another image
315 And 315A Hamilton Road, Boghall Steading				55°50′26″N 4°07′28″W	Category C(S)	33669	Upload Photo
102-106 (Even Nos) Main Street, Church Street, Baillieston				55°51′01″N 4°06′37″W	Category C(S)	33673	Upload Photo
15 Swinton Road, St Bridget's Roman Catholic Church And Presbytery, Boundary Walls, Gates And Railings				55°51′09″N 4°06′36″W	Category B	33679	Upload Photo
161 Crookston Road, Former Stable Block To Ross Hall				55°50′28″N 4°21′50″W	Category C(S)	33590	Upload Photo
510 Crookston Road, Leverndale Hospital, Gate Lodge				55°50′06″N 4°21′51″W	Category C(S)	33594	Upload Photo
21 Lochmaben Road, Former Crookston Station And Stationmaster's Cottage				55°50′33″N 4°21′52″W	Category B	33600	Upload another image
7 Keppochill Road, Keppochhill Court, Blocks A And B, Former Springburn Fire Station With Elevation To Springburn Road				55°52′47″N 4°14′04″W	Category B	33615	Upload Photo
2 Speirs Wharf, Canal House				55°52′18″N 4°15′27″W	Category B	33618	Upload Photo
247-255 (Odd Nos) Springburn Way (Formerly 563-567 (Odd Nos) Springburn Road), And 30 Hillkirk Street Lane, Trustee Savings Bank Building				55°53′00″N 4°13′46″W	Category B	33625	Upload Photo
225 Scotland Street, Scotland Street School, With Janitor's House And Railings				55°50′58″N 4°16′25″W	Category A	33534	Upload another image See more images
2-6 Scotland Street (Even Nos), 220-228 West Street (Even Nos) And 65-75 Paterson Street (Odd Nos)				55°51′00″N 4°16′01″W	Category B	33535	Upload Photo
3 Sydenham Road, Including Mews Cottage				55°52′42″N 4°18′09″W	Category B	33544	Upload Photo
6 Rowan Road Craigie Hall, Dumbreck				55°50′49″N 4°18′32″W	Category A	33583	Upload another image
50 St Andrew's Drive, Glenafton Nursing Home, Including Boundary Walls And Gatepiers				55°50′43″N 4°17′16″W	Category B	33466	Upload Photo
620 Shields Road, Nithsdale Lodge, Former Pollokshields West Church Including Boundary Wall And Gatepiers				55°50′26″N 4°16′40″W	Category B	33482	Upload another image See more images
99 Springkell Avenue, Including Boundary Walls And Gatepiers				55°50′21″N 4°17′53″W	Category B	33483	Upload Photo
129 Abbotsford Place And Pollokshaws Road, School And Janitor's House				55°50′47″N 4°15′32″W	Category B	33490	Upload another image
339 Eglinton Street And Devon Street, Former Eglinton Congregational Church				55°50′47″N 4°15′39″W	Category B	33509	Upload Photo
63 Fotheringay Road, United Reformed Church, Former Pollokshields Congregational Church And Hall				55°50′14″N 4°17′01″W	Category C(S)	33406	Upload Photo
30 Leslie Street And Kenmure Street, Pollokshields District Library				55°50′28″N 4°16′22″W	Category B	33419	Upload another image See more images
8 Matilda Road, Including Boundary Walls And Gatepiers				55°50′40″N 4°17′05″W	Category B	33422	Upload Photo
37, 37A Newark Drive, Including Boundary Walls And Gatepiers				55°50′24″N 4°17′00″W	Category B	33431	Upload Photo
39 Newark Drive, Including Boundary Walls And Gatepiers				55°50′25″N 4°17′02″W	Category B	33432	Upload Photo
202 Nithsdale Road, Castlehill, Including Boundary Walls And Gatepiers				55°50′32″N 4°17′13″W	Category A	33451	Upload Photo
514 And 516 Pollokshaws Road And 1 Albert Drive, St Ninian's Episcopal Church Including Hall				55°50′27″N 4°16′00″W	Category B	33454	Upload another image
55 St Andrews Drive Including Gatepiers, Boundary Walls And Gates				55°50′42″N 4°17′12″W	Category B	33461	Upload Photo
Kittoch Bridge, B759 Over Kittoch Water				55°47′06″N 4°15′03″W	Category C(S)	33332	Upload Photo
Linn Park, Iron Bridge				55°48′20″N 4°15′56″W	Category B	33333	Upload another image
18 Clydebrae Street, Govan Graving Docks				55°51′39″N 4°18′03″W	Category A	33336	Upload another image See more images
577-581 Govan Road, Former Govan Press Buildings				55°51′37″N 4°18′13″W	Category B	33341	Upload Photo
Near 801 Govan Road, Junction With Burleigh Street, Sir William Pearce, Statue				55°51′48″N 4°18′46″W	Category B	33343	Upload another image
816, 818 Govan Road, 1, 3 Water Row, Former British Linen Bank, And Flats				55°51′48″N 4°18′42″W	Category A	33351	Upload Photo
100-132 (Even Nos) Albert Drive And Darnley Street				55°50′30″N 4°16′11″W	Category B	33375	Upload Photo
330 And 330A Albert Drive, Including Boundary Walls And Gatepiers				55°50′39″N 4°17′06″W	Category B	33380	Upload Photo
110 West George Street				55°51′45″N 4°15′21″W	Category B	33237	Upload another image
144, 146 West George Street, Cornhill House				55°51′46″N 4°15′26″W	Category A	33241	Upload Photo
110-126 (Even Nos) West Nile Street And 17, 19 Bath Street				55°51′48″N 4°15′15″W	Category C(S)	33255	Upload Photo
79 West Regent Street And 183-191 (Odd Nos) Hope Street				55°51′47″N 4°15′29″W	Category B	33258	Upload Photo
91, 93 West Regent Street				55°51′47″N 4°15′31″W	Category C(S)	33261	Upload Photo
172-186 (Even Nos) West Regent Street				55°51′50″N 4°15′42″W	Category B	33279	Upload another image
74 York Street And 55-61 (Odd Nos) Robertson Lane				55°51′30″N 4°15′44″W	Category B	33284	Upload Photo
166 Broomfield Road, Immaculate Heart Of Mary, Rc Church				55°53′14″N 4°13′29″W	Category B	33294	Upload Photo
Elder Park, Cottage				55°51′49″N 4°19′37″W	Category B	33302	Upload Photo
Elder Park, Statue Of John Elder				55°51′46″N 4°19′19″W	Category B	33305	Upload another image
1345 Govan Road, Southern General Hospital				55°51′47″N 4°20′15″W	Category B	33307	Upload another image
336-356 (Even Nos) Sauchiehall Street And 1 Scott Street				55°51′57″N 4°15′54″W	Category A	33193	Upload another image
396-450A (Even Nos) Sauchiehall Street, And 2 Garnet Street				55°51′58″N 4°16′00″W	Category B	33194	Upload another image

== Key ==
The scheme for classifying buildings in Scotland is:

- Category A: "buildings of national or international importance, either architectural or historic; or fine, little-altered examples of some particular period, style or building type."
- Category B: "buildings of regional or more than local importance; or major examples of some particular period, style or building type, which may have been altered."
- Category C: "buildings of local importance; lesser examples of any period, style, or building type, as originally constructed or moderately altered; and simple traditional buildings which group well with other listed buildings."

In March 2016 there were 47,288 listed buildings in Scotland. Of these, 8% were Category A, and 50% were Category B, with the remaining 42% being Category C.

== See also ==
- List of listed buildings in Glasgow
