= Gladstone Hotel =

Gladstone Hotel may refer to:

- The Gladstone Hotel (Toronto), a historic hotel and noted performance venue in Toronto, Ontario, Canada
- Gladstone Hotel (Circle, Montana), listed on the National Register of Historic Places in McCone County, Montana, United States
- Hotel Gladstone, Frostburg, Maryland, USA

== See also ==
- Gladstone Inn, Gladstone, New Zealand
- Gladstone (disambiguation)
