= List of listed buildings in Glasgow/9 =

This is a list of listed buildings in Glasgow, Scotland.

== List ==
Name	Location	Date listed	Grid ref. (Note: Sometimes known as OSGB36, the grid reference (where provided) is based on the British national grid reference system used by the Ordnance Survey. • "Guide to National Grid". Ordnance Survey. • "Get-a-map". Ordnance Survey.)	Geo-coordinates	Notes	LB number (Note: Historic Environment Scotland assign a unique alphanumeric identifier to each designated site in Scotland, for listed buildings this always begins with "LB", for example "LB12345".)	Image
4-7 (Odd Nos) Chalmers Gate (Formerly 394 Gallowgate)				55°51′20″N 4°13′57″W	Category B	33823	Upload Photo
71A, 73-77 (Odd Nos) Clouston Street And Railings				55°52′55″N 4°17′21″W	Category C(S)	33757	Upload Photo
275-277 (Odd Nos) Garrioch Road And 72, 74, 76 Clouston Street With Railings And Gatepiers				55°52′56″N 4°17′20″W	Category C(S)	33763	Upload Photo
485 St George's Road, Former St George In The Fields				55°52′27″N 4°15′50″W	Category A	33782	Upload another image See more images
35 Cuthbertson Street And Coplaw Street, Cuthbertson Primary School Including Janitors Lodge, Playground Walls And Gatepiers				55°50′22″N 4°15′52″W	Category B	33691	Upload another image
Adelphi Street/Glasgow Green, St Andrews Suspension Bridge				55°50′56″N 4°14′18″W	Category A	33692	Upload another image See more images
170 Langside Road, Calder Street Govanhill Library				55°50′16″N 4°15′42″W	Category B	33695	Upload another image See more images
Richmond Park, Footbridge Over Polmadie Burn, (Opposite Queensferry Street)				55°50′19″N 4°13′55″W	Category C(S)	33699	Upload Photo
201 Ardencraig Road, Castlemilk, St Martin's Roman Catholic Church And Presbytery				55°48′05″N 4°13′13″W	Category B	33701	Upload another image
325 Carmunnock Road, King's Park, Aikenhead House, Gatepiers On Main Drive				55°48′58″N 4°14′46″W	Category B	33709	Upload Photo
325 Carmunnock Road, King's Park, Aikenhead House Stable Block				55°48′45″N 4°14′34″W	Category B	33711	Upload Photo
Machrie Road, Barlia Terrace, Castlemilk House Bridge				55°48′29″N 4°13′14″W	Category B	33721	Upload Photo
100 Acre Road, Acre House With Boundary Walls And Gatepiers				55°54′14″N 4°18′24″W	Category C(S)	33727	Upload Photo
Maryhill Road, Martyrs Memorial Pillar				55°53′50″N 4°17′58″W	Category C(S)	33732	Upload Photo
Bilsland Drive Aqueduct				55°53′05″N 4°16′45″W	Category B	33745	Upload another image
14 Orr Street, Olympia Street, County Bingo				55°50′58″N 4°13′34″W	Category B	33642	Upload another image See more images
179 Shettleston Road, Including Gates And Railings, Employment Exchange				55°51′17″N 4°11′48″W	Category B	33643	Upload Photo
316 Caledonia Road, Rutherglen Road, Southern Necropolis Lodge				55°50′38″N 4°14′43″W	Category A	33685	Upload another image See more images
500 Corselet Road, Darnley Mill				55°48′27″N 4°19′57″W	Category B	33589	Upload Photo
510 Crookston Road, Leverndale Hospital, Towerview Unit				55°50′04″N 4°22′14″W	Category A	33597	Upload Photo
Ralston Avenue 109 (Westfield) And 113 (Auldersyde) Including Boundary Walls And Gatepiers				55°50′31″N 4°22′10″W	Category B	33606	Upload Photo
Salterland Road, Bridge At Salterland				55°48′45″N 4°22′30″W	Category C(S)	33607	Upload Photo
104 Elmvale Street, 712 Hawthorn Street, Elmvale Primary School Including Janitor's Lodge And Playground Walls				55°53′10″N 4°14′02″W	Category B	33611	Upload Photo
110-136 (Even Nos) Flemington Street, Former Springburn College Including Range To East				55°52′47″N 4°13′50″W	Category A	33612	Upload Photo
48, 54 Gourlay Street, Springburn Nursery School, Former Springburn Primary School				55°52′51″N 4°14′07″W	Category C(S)	33613	Upload Photo
6, 10 Hillkirk Street St Aloysius Rc Church And Presbytery				55°53′00″N 4°13′47″W	Category B	33614	Upload Photo
1448-1456 (Even Nos) Gallowgate And Burgher Street				55°51′04″N 4°11′51″W	Category B	33634	Upload another image
8, 10 Haugh Road And 9 Overnewton Street, St Vincent Masonic Halls				55°51′58″N 4°17′24″W	Category C(S)	33545	Upload Photo
5 Sydenham Road Including Gatepiers And Coachhouse				55°52′41″N 4°18′07″W	Category B	33547	Upload Photo
Lainshaw Drive, Linn Crematorium Including Canopies, Gatepiers, Railings And Lodges				55°48′02″N 4°15′43″W	Category B	33549	Upload Photo
995 Paisley Road West, Lodge To Bellahouston Park				55°50′55″N 4°19′02″W	Category C(S)	33578	Upload another image
520-532 (Even Nos) Paisley Road West, 8 Ibroxholm Place, 33 Ibroxholm Avenue				55°51′03″N 4°18′16″W	Category B	33581	Upload Photo
20 Corkerhill Gardens, Maryland House				55°50′45″N 4°19′57″W	Category C(S)	33588	Upload another image See more images
32 St Andrews Drive				55°50′48″N 4°16′52″W	Category B	33465	Upload Photo
11 Sherbrooke Avenue And Nithsdale Road, Sherbrooke Hotel, Including Boundary Walls, Railings And Gatepiers				55°50′35″N 4°17′50″W	Category B	33468	Upload Photo
34 Sherbrooke Avenue Cairn O'Mount, Including Gatepiers And Boundary Walls				55°50′28″N 4°18′00″W	Category B	33475	Upload Photo
30, 30A Sutherland Avenue, Ardtornish, Including Boundary Walls And Gatepiers				55°50′27″N 4°17′52″W	Category B	33487	Upload Photo
1, 3 Bridge Street And 87 Carlton Place				55°51′16″N 4°15′29″W	Category B	33492	Upload Photo
Govan Road And Paisley Road Junction, Piazza At North Side, Toll Gate Pier				55°51′14″N 4°16′45″W	Category B	33514	Upload Photo
56-64 Kingston Street And Return Elevation To Centre Street				55°51′15″N 4°15′43″W	Category B	33516	Upload Photo
27 Newark Drive, Including Boundary Walls, Gatepiers And Gates				55°50′23″N 4°16′54″W	Category B	33429	Upload Photo
16 Newark Drive, Including Boundary Walls And Gatepiers				55°50′24″N 4°16′46″W	Category B	33436	Upload Photo
193 Nithsdale Road, Including Boundary Walls And Gatepiers				55°50′29″N 4°17′07″W	Category B	33439	Upload Photo
195 Nithsdale Road, Including Boundary Walls And Gatepiers				55°50′29″N 4°17′08″W	Category C(S)	33440	Upload Photo
174 Nithsdale Road, Ashbank, Including Boundary Walls And Gatepiers				55°50′29″N 4°16′48″W	Category C(S)	33446	Upload another image See more images
200 Nithsdale Road, Ellisland, Including Boundary Walls And Gatepiers				55°50′32″N 4°17′11″W	Category A	33450	Upload Photo
2060 Pollokshaws Road, Pollok House Former Stables, Including Courtyard Ranges				55°49′35″N 4°18′59″W	Category A	33457	Upload another image
2060 Pollokshaws Road, Pollok House, Shawmuir Lodge On Pollok Avenue, Including Gates And Gatepiers				55°49′36″N 4°18′03″W	Category B	33459	Upload Photo
2060 Pollokshaws Road, Pollok House Walled Gardens, Including Drybridge				55°49′38″N 4°18′56″W	Category B	33460	Upload another image See more images
61 St Andrew's Drive, 46 Aytoun Road, Doralee, Including Boundary Walls And Gatepiers				55°50′37″N 4°17′17″W	Category B	33463	Upload Photo
65 St Andrews Drive, Including Boundary Walls And Gatepiers				55°50′30″N 4°17′20″W	Category B	33464	Upload Photo
Carmunnock, 107 Waterside Road, (2-Storey Range Only)				55°47′29″N 4°14′08″W	Category C(S)	33329	Upload Photo
831 Govan Road, St Anthony's Rc Church				55°51′48″N 4°18′52″W	Category B	33345	Upload Photo
908 Govan Road And Return Elevation To Mckechnie Street, County Bingo Social Club, Former Lyceum Cinema				55°51′51″N 4°18′55″W	Category B	33355	Upload Photo
1030, 1048 Govan Road, Govan Shipbuilders Ltd, General Offices (Excluding 1956 Extension To W)				55°51′56″N 4°19′25″W	Category A	33356	Upload Photo
137-143 (Odd Nos) Albert Drive And 100, 102 Forth Street				55°50′29″N 4°16′16″W	Category B	33366	Upload Photo
165-193 (Odd Nos) Albert Drive, 159 Kenmure Street And 50-54 (Even Nos) Glenapp Street				55°50′31″N 4°16′21″W	Category B	33368	Upload Photo
328 Albert Drive, Craigholme School Infant Department, Including Gatepiers And Boundary Walls				55°50′39″N 4°17′02″W	Category B	33379	Upload Photo
354 Albert Drive, Including Boundary Walls And Gatepiers				55°50′41″N 4°17′30″W	Category B	33384	Upload Photo
48 And 48A Dalziel Drive, Including Boundary Walls And Gatepiers				55°50′32″N 4°17′36″W	Category B	33399	Upload Photo
58, 58A Dalziel Drive, Including Boundary Walls And Gatepiers				55°50′34″N 4°17′47″W	Category B	33400	Upload Photo
Darnley Road/Moray Place, Former Strathbungo Station, Footbridge				55°50′15″N 4°16′28″W	Category C(S)	33401	Upload Photo
95 West Regent Street				55°51′47″N 4°15′31″W	Category C(S)	33262	Upload Photo
140, 142 Balgrayhill Road, Including Redclyffe				55°53′18″N 4°13′49″W	Category A	33288	Upload Photo
Springburn Park, Column				55°53′23″N 4°13′35″W	Category B	33296	Upload Photo
Springburn Park, Statue Of James Reid				55°53′23″N 4°13′29″W	Category B	33297	Upload Photo
87,91 Holmfauld Road, Linthouse Buildings				55°51′57″N 4°19′55″W	Category B	33309	Upload Photo
228A Langlands Road And Elder Park Street, Elder Park Library				55°51′43″N 4°19′19″W	Category A	33310	Upload Photo
202-212 (Even Nos) Sauchiehall Street And 8-12 (Even Nos) Cambridge Street				55°51′55″N 4°15′36″W	Category B	33191	Upload another image
474 Sauchiehall Street				55°51′59″N 4°16′08″W	Category B	33196	Upload Photo
101-115 (Odd Nos) Union Street And 59-69 (Odd Nos) Gordon Street				55°51′37″N 4°15′27″W	Category B, Destroyed in the 2026 Glasgow fire	33205	Upload Photo
64 Waterloo Street				55°51′39″N 4°15′45″W	Category B	33215	Upload Photo
139, 141 West George Street				55°51′44″N 4°15′25″W	Category B	33225	Upload Photo
299-311 (Odd Nos) West George Street And 103-109 (Odd Nos) Douglas Street				55°51′47″N 4°15′53″W	Category B	33232	Upload Photo
47 St Vincent Street And 131-137 (Odd Nos) Buchanan Street, Royal Bank Buildings				55°51′40″N 4°15′16″W	Category B	33130	Upload another image
105-113 (Odd Nos) St Vincent Street				55°51′41″N 4°15′27″W	Category B	33137	Upload Photo
189, 191 St Vincent Street				55°51′43″N 4°15′43″W	Category C(S)	33146	Upload Photo
209-213 (Odd Nos) St Vincent Street				55°51′43″N 4°15′46″W	Category C(S)	33148	Upload Photo
1 La Belle Place And 7, 11 Clifton Street And La Belle Allee, Hindu Mandir, Former Queen's Rooms				55°52′00″N 4°16′45″W	Category A	33082	Upload Photo
147-159 (Odd Nos) North Street				55°51′50″N 4°16′18″W	Category B	33094	Upload Photo
121-125 (Odd Nos) Renfield Street And Renfrew Street, The Pavilion Theatre				55°51′54″N 4°15′21″W	Category A	33103	Upload another image
12 Rose Street, Glasgow Film Theatre				55°51′57″N 4°15′40″W	Category B	33118	Upload another image
46-64 (Even Nos) St Enoch Square And 27-35 (Odd Nos) Howard Street				55°51′26″N 4°15′22″W	Category B	33126	Upload Photo
20-40 (Even Nos) Gordon Street And 1, 3 West Nile Street				55°51′39″N 4°15′22″W	Category A	33031	Upload Photo
45-47 (Odd Nos) Hill Street, And 21 Dalhousie Street, St Aloysius College				55°52′01″N 4°15′50″W	Category B	33037	Upload another image
133, 135 Hill Street				55°52′02″N 4°16′05″W	Category B	33041	Upload Photo
140-150 (Even Nos) Hill Street, Former Beatson Hospital Annexe				55°52′04″N 4°16′05″W	Category B	33047	Upload another image
19-23 (Odd Nos) Hope Street				55°51′33″N 4°15′35″W	Category B	33049	Upload Photo
154-158 (Even Nos) Hope Street				55°51′47″N 4°15′27″W	Category C(S)	33057	Upload Photo
27-59 (Odd Nos) James Watt Street And 42-52 (Even Nos) Brown Street				55°51′27″N 4°15′52″W	Category B	33067	Upload Photo
44-54 (Even Nos) James Watt Street (Known As 60 James Watt Street)				55°51′30″N 4°15′50″W	Category A	33069	Upload Photo
12-20 (Even Nos) Kelvingrove Street And 26-28 Westminster Terrace				55°51′55″N 4°17′02″W	Category B	33073	Upload Photo
152-154 (Even Nos) Bath Street				55°51′52″N 4°15′39″W	Category C(S)	32966	Upload Photo
256A Bath Street, Renfield St Stephen's Church, Former St Matthew's Blythswood (Church Of Scotland)				55°51′55″N 4°16′01″W	Category B	32970	Upload another image
48-52 (Even Nos) Bothwell Street				55°51′41″N 4°15′39″W	Category B	32986	Upload Photo
45 Buchanan Street And 34-50 (Even Nos) Mitchell Street, Former Wylie And Lochead's				55°51′33″N 4°15′19″W	Category A	32992	Upload another image
16-20 (Even Nos) Cambridge Street				55°51′55″N 4°15′36″W	Category B	33007	Upload another image
3 Gilmorehill, University Of Glasgow, John Macintyre Building, University Avenue, Former Students Union				55°52′20″N 4°17′20″W	Category B	32921	Upload another image
646-654 (Even Nos) Argyle Street, The Buttery				55°51′39″N 4°16′18″W	Category B	32952	Upload Photo
30 Queen Margaret Drive, Bbc				55°52′43″N 4°17′13″W	Category B	32902	Upload Photo
64 Southpark Avenue, Southpark House				55°52′26″N 4°17′13″W	Category B	32907	Upload another image
10 Dumbarton Road, Maggie's Centre, Former Western Infirmary Gate Lodge				55°52′12″N 4°17′42″W	Category C(S)	32866	Upload Photo
93-95 (Odd Nos) Hyndland Street, Cottier Theatre Complex, Former Dowanhill Church And Halls				55°52′27″N 4°18′07″W	Category A	32879	Upload Photo
Wilson Street, Police Box				55°51′31″N 4°14′55″W	Category B	32803	Upload another image
34-36 North Frederick Street, "Gladstone House"				55°51′42″N 4°14′54″W	Category B	32811	Upload Photo
134-148 (Even Nos) Queen Street With 13-14 George Square, Olympic House				55°51′38″N 4°15′05″W	Category B	32821	Upload Photo
1 St Andrews Square, St Andrews Parish Church (Church Of Scotland)				55°51′17″N 4°14′34″W	Category A	32830	Upload another image
118-126 (Even Nos) Howard Street, Known As 126 Howard Street				55°51′21″N 4°15′10″W	Category B	32728	Upload another image See more images
177 Ingram Street With 99 Glassford Street				55°51′35″N 4°14′56″W	Category A	32734	Upload Photo
184-188 (Even Nos) Ingram Street And Return Elevation To South Frederick Street				55°51′36″N 4°14′57″W	Category B	32747	Upload Photo
13-21 (Odds) James Morrison Street And 2 St Andrew's Square				55°51′19″N 4°14′34″W	Category B	32749	Upload Photo
48-54 (Even Nos) Miller Street, (Formerly Stirling's Library)				55°51′32″N 4°15′03″W	Category A	32761	Upload Photo
62-70 (Even Nos) Miller Street Known As 70 Miller Street				55°51′33″N 4°15′02″W	Category B	32762	Upload Photo
23-25 (Odd Nos) Montrose Street And 8 Cochrane Street				55°51′37″N 4°14′46″W	Category B	32764	Upload Photo
Smith's Court, South Side (Access From Pend At No 62 Brunswick Street)				55°51′28″N 4°14′48″W	Category B	32766	Upload Photo
157-159 (Odd Nos) Trongate Terleys				55°51′26″N 4°14′54″W	Category B	32777	Upload Photo
2-16 (Even Nos) Trongate/High Street, Quadrant With Bank Of Scotland				55°51′25″N 4°14′38″W	Category B	32780	Upload Photo
106-110 (Even Nos) Trongate And 3-9 (Odd Nos) Candleriggs				55°51′26″N 4°14′47″W	Category B	32785	Upload Photo
59-61 (Odd Nos) Virginia Street				55°51′33″N 4°15′01″W	Category C(S)	32797	Upload Photo
3 Castle Street, Provand's Lordship With Railings				55°51′45″N 4°14′13″W	Category A	32648	Upload another image
Cathedral Square, Memorial Stone				55°51′46″N 4°14′10″W	Category C(S)	32659	Upload Photo
Cathedral Square, Statue Of William Iii				55°51′43″N 4°14′11″W	Category A	32660	Upload another image See more images
52 Charlotte Street				55°51′16″N 4°14′27″W	Category A	32663	Upload another image
Clyde Street, Albert Bridge				55°51′09″N 4°14′50″W	Category A	32667	Upload another image
30 George Square And 7 West George Street, The Merchants' House				55°51′41″N 4°15′06″W	Category A	32689	Upload another image
George Square, Field Marshal Lord Clyde Statue				55°51′39″N 4°15′01″W	Category B	32694	Upload another image
George Square, Robert Peel Statue				55°51′41″N 4°15′04″W	Category B	32704	Upload another image See more images
George Square Thomas Graham Statue				55°51′39″N 4°14′58″W	Category B	32705	Upload another image
145-195 (Odd Nos) Albion Street				55°51′36″N 4°14′38″W	Category A	32607	Upload another image
20 Buchanan Street				55°51′31″N 4°15′16″W	Category B	32632	Upload Photo
34-58 (Even Nos) Buchanan Street With 7-17 (Odd Nos) Springfield Court, Formerly Prince Of Wales Buildings Now Known As Princes Square				55°51′33″N 4°15′16″W	Category B	32634	Upload another image
156-164 (Even Nos) Buchanan Street With 48-50 (Even Nos) West George Street, Tower Building				55°51′44″N 4°15′12″W	Category B	32642	Upload another image
20-26 (Even Nos) Roxburgh Street And 33-35 (Odd Nos) Saltoun Street				55°52′37″N 4°17′39″W	Category B	32583	Upload another image
7 Victoria Circus, (Greenbank), With Outbuildings And Gatepiers				55°52′43″N 4°18′02″W	Category B	32591	Upload Photo
4 Victoria Circus, (Northcote) And Gatepiers				55°52′45″N 4°18′02″W	Category C(S)	32592	Upload Photo
8-12 (Inclusive Nos) Kirklee Quadrant				55°52′54″N 4°17′39″W	Category B	32548	Upload Photo
8 Prince Albert Road And 7 Sydenham Road With Boundary Wall And Gatepiers				55°52′40″N 4°18′09″W	Category B	32574	Upload Photo
24 Highburgh Road, And 3 And 7 Caledon Street, Western Telephone Exchange				55°52′29″N 4°17′49″W	Category B	32521	Upload Photo
1 Dundonald Road (Fern Tower) And Gatepiers				55°52′41″N 4°17′51″W	Category B	32504	Upload Photo
730 Great Western Road; Botanic Gardens, Curators House				55°52′46″N 4°17′20″W	Category B	32509	Upload Photo
174 Queen's Drive, Seventh Day Adventist Church				55°50′07″N 4°16′13″W	Category B	32458	Upload another image See more images
519-537 (Odd Nos) Victoria Road				55°50′03″N 4°15′55″W	Category C(S)	32463	Upload another image See more images
Victoria Road, Queen's Park Station				55°50′07″N 4°16′02″W	Category B	32466	Upload another image See more images
35-53 (Odd Nos) Westmoreland Street, 165 Allison Street				55°50′11″N 4°15′48″W	Category C(S)	32468	Upload Photo
Sandbank Street, Maryhill High Church, (Church Of Scotland) And Halls To 7 Aray Street				55°53′33″N 4°17′37″W	Category C(S)	32357	Upload Photo
30-36 (Even Nos) Sandy Road, 120-124 (Even Nos) Beith Street, Former Partick Fire Station				55°52′09″N 4°18′55″W	Category B	32297	Upload another image
Forth And Clyde Canal Aqueduct (Adjoining Skaethorn Road Bridge)				55°53′33″N 4°18′06″W	Category A	32316	Upload Photo
1051 Great Western Road And Adjoining Retaining Walls And Balustrade (Carriages Restaurant)				55°53′03″N 4°18′34″W	Category B	32317	Upload Photo
1055 Great Western Road Gartnavel Royal Hospital, Garden, Boundary And Retaining Walls				55°53′01″N 4°19′09″W	Category A	32318	Upload another image
1099 Great Western Road, 6 Whittingehame Gardens				55°53′11″N 4°18′59″W	Category C(S)	32327	Upload Photo

== Key ==
The scheme for classifying buildings in Scotland is:

- Category A: "buildings of national or international importance, either architectural or historic; or fine, little-altered examples of some particular period, style or building type."
- Category B: "buildings of regional or more than local importance; or major examples of some particular period, style or building type, which may have been altered."
- Category C: "buildings of local importance; lesser examples of any period, style, or building type, as originally constructed or moderately altered; and simple traditional buildings which group well with other listed buildings."

In March 2016 there were 47,288 listed buildings in Scotland. Of these, 8% were Category A, and 50% were Category B, with the remaining 42% being Category C.

== See also ==
- List of listed buildings in Glasgow
