= List of listed buildings in Yetholm, Scottish Borders =

This is a list of listed buildings in the parish of Yetholm in the Scottish Borders, Scotland.

== List ==
Name	Location	Date Listed	Grid Ref. (Note: Sometimes known as OSGB36, the grid reference (where provided) is based on the British national grid reference system used by the Ordnance Survey. • "Guide to National Grid". Ordnance Survey. • "Get-a-map". Ordnance Survey.)	Geo-coordinates	Notes	LB Number (Note: Historic Environment Scotland assign a unique alphanumeric identifier to each designated site in Scotland, for listed buildings this always begins with "LB", for example "LB12345".)	Image
The Crescent, Cheviot Villa				55°32′44″N 2°17′18″W	Category C(S)	19426	Upload another image
Catch-A-Penny Cottage				55°33′14″N 2°18′58″W	Category C(S)	19453	Upload Photo
Cherrytrees Steading With Clocktower/Dovecot				55°33′24″N 2°18′04″W	Category B	19456	Upload Photo
Cherrytrees, East Lodge With Gatepiers And Quadrant Wall				55°33′24″N 2°18′06″W	Category C(S)	19457	Upload Photo
Cherrytrees Road, Bridge Over Thirlestane Burn				55°33′15″N 2°18′57″W	Category C(S)	19460	Upload Photo
By Town Yetholm, Virtue Well				55°33′04″N 2°17′06″W	Category C(S)	19470	Upload Photo
War Memorial Between Town Yetholm And Kirk Yetholm				55°32′44″N 2°16′50″W	Category C(S)	19478	Upload another image
Primary School Including Playsheds				55°32′52″N 2°17′04″W	Category C(S)	15400	Upload Photo
1 Mount View				55°32′50″N 2°17′10″W	Category C(S)	15401	Upload Photo
Mill Drive, Waukford Bridge				55°32′53″N 2°16′40″W	Category C(S)	15404	Upload Photo
Yetholm Mill Including House, Mill And Farm Buildings				55°32′45″N 2°16′44″W	Category C(S)	15413	Upload another image See more images
The Crescent, Craiglea And Post Office				55°32′43″N 2°17′19″W	Category C(S)	19422	Upload another image
The Crescent, Rowanbank Including Outbuildings				55°32′45″N 2°17′17″W	Category C(S)	19428	Upload another image
Main Street, Frandor				55°32′47″N 2°17′13″W	Category C(S)	19437	Upload Photo
Main Street, Wauchope Hall				55°32′49″N 2°17′14″W	Category B	19438	Upload Photo
1 Bowmont Terrace Including Outbuilding And Boundary Walls				55°32′51″N 2°17′12″W	Category C(S)	19445	Upload Photo
Peniel Revival Centre And Halterburn, Including Boundary Walls				55°32′11″N 2°15′12″W	Category C(S)	19463	Upload another image
Lochtower Farm, Byre				55°32′50″N 2°18′41″W	Category C(S)	19464	Upload Photo
Primsidemill, Cottage 1				55°31′57″N 2°17′48″W	Category B	19465	Upload Photo
Main Street, Montrose Cottage				55°32′46″N 2°17′12″W	Category C(S)	19400	Upload Photo
Main Street, Chevoit House And Eildon House Including Outbuildings				55°32′45″N 2°17′12″W	Category B	19405	Upload another image See more images
Morebattle Road, Copeswood				55°32′33″N 2°17′17″W	Category C(S)	19410	Upload Photo
High Street, Hillview				55°32′49″N 2°16′31″W	Category C(S)	15395	Upload another image
The Green, Water Pump				55°32′51″N 2°16′35″W	Category C(S)	15407	Upload another image
The Green, Mrs Turnbull				55°32′52″N 2°16′33″W	Category C(S)	15409	Upload another image
Parish Church And Graveyard, Including Gatepiers And Boundary Walls				55°32′46″N 2°16′40″W	Category B	15414	Upload another image
The Crescent, Cheviot Cottage Including Outbuildings				55°32′44″N 2°17′18″W	Category C(S)	19427	Upload another image
The Crescent, Greenbank				55°32′45″N 2°17′16″W	Category C(S)	19430	Upload another image
The Crescent, Twizel House Including Outbuildings				55°32′46″N 2°17′16″W	Category C(S)	19432	Upload another image
3 Bowmont Terrace				55°32′51″N 2°17′12″W	Category C(S)	19443	Upload Photo
2 Bowmont Terrace				55°32′51″N 2°17′12″W	Category C(S)	19444	Upload Photo
Cherrytrees, Main Lodge With Gates, Gatepiers And Quadrant Walls				55°33′21″N 2°18′17″W	Category B	19455	Upload Photo
Main Street, Ivy Cottage				55°32′47″N 2°17′11″W	Category C(S)	19398	Upload Photo
Main Street And Yew Tree Road, Myrtle Cottage				55°32′41″N 2°17′16″W	Category B	19408	Upload another image See more images
Main Street, Church View				55°32′48″N 2°16′35″W	Category B	15398	Upload another image
Venchen Road, Old Manse				55°32′52″N 2°17′09″W	Category C(S)	19448	Upload Photo
C48 Road Bridge Over Bowmont Water Between Town And Kirk Yetholm				55°32′46″N 2°16′56″W	Category B	19452	Upload another image See more images
Cherrytrees Brook Cottage				55°33′23″N 2°18′04″W	Category B	19458	Upload Photo
Primsidemill, Cottage 2				55°31′57″N 2°17′49″W	Category B	19466	Upload Photo
Dow Brae, Smithy House Including Boundary Wall				55°32′49″N 2°17′10″W	Category C(S)	19396	Upload Photo
Main Street, Thatched Cottage Including Outbuildings				55°32′45″N 2°17′11″W	Category C(S)	19404	Upload another image
Main Street, Lowriewell				55°32′37″N 2°17′20″W	Category C(S)	19412	Upload another image
Main Street, Hilton View				55°32′40″N 2°17′17″W	Category C(S)	19417	Upload another image
Main Street, Cross Keys House				55°32′50″N 2°16′34″W	Category B	15403	Upload another image
The Green, The Vardo				55°32′52″N 2°16′33″W	Category C(S)	15408	Upload another image
The Green, Mrs E Hirst				55°32′52″N 2°16′31″W	Category C(S)	15410	Upload another image
Main Street, The Cottage M E Whitelaw				55°32′49″N 2°16′35″W	Category C(S)	15418	Upload another image
Main Street, Dalveen				55°32′43″N 2°17′15″W	Category C(S)	19420	Upload another image
The Crescent, Hillcote				55°32′43″N 2°17′19″W	Category C(S)	19423	Upload another image
The Crescent, Dean Cottage				55°32′44″N 2°17′18″W	Category C(S)	19425	Upload another image
Main Street, Gladstone House				55°32′46″N 2°17′15″W	Category C(S)	19434	Upload Photo
4 Bowmont Terrace				55°32′51″N 2°17′12″W	Category C(S)	19442	Upload Photo
Main Street, Wauchope Monument Including Railings				55°32′45″N 2°17′14″W	Category C(S)	19450	Upload another image See more images
Primsidemill, Bridge				55°31′56″N 2°17′48″W	Category B	19468	Upload Photo
Main Street, Dunbridge House And Hudson House				55°32′47″N 2°17′11″W	Category B	19397	Upload Photo
Main Street, Hirsel Cottage				55°32′39″N 2°17′18″W	Category C(S)	19415	Upload another image
Main Street, Hawthorn Cottage				55°32′41″N 2°17′19″W	Category C(S)	19416	Upload another image
Main Street, The Manse Including Boundary Walls				55°32′43″N 2°16′42″W	Category C(S)	15399	Upload another image
2 Mount View				55°32′50″N 2°17′10″W	Category C(S)	15402	Upload Photo
Mill Drive, 1 Waukford				55°32′53″N 2°16′39″W	Category C(S)	15405	Upload Photo
Main Street, Staerough View				55°32′48″N 2°16′36″W	Category C(S)	15416	Upload another image
The Crescent, Balcherry				55°32′44″N 2°17′18″W	Category C(S)	19424	Upload another image
The Crescent, Myrtle Cottage				55°32′45″N 2°17′17″W	Category C(S)	19429	Upload another image
The Crescent, J V Adams & Sons, Provisions				55°32′45″N 2°17′16″W	Category C(S)	19431	Upload another image See more images
Main Street, Greenlea				55°32′47″N 2°17′14″W	Category C(S)	19436	Upload Photo
Main Street, K6 Telephone Kiosk	Town Yetholm			55°32′45″N 2°17′14″W	Category B	19449	Upload another image See more images
B6352, Bridge Over The Stank				55°33′02″N 2°17′05″W	Category C(S)	19451	Upload Photo
Cherrytrees House				55°33′24″N 2°18′10″W	Category B	19454	Upload Photo
Thirlestane House				55°33′10″N 2°18′47″W	Category B	19469	Upload Photo
Main Street, Greystone House				55°32′47″N 2°17′12″W	Category C(S)	19399	Upload Photo
Main Street, Greengarth				55°32′46″N 2°17′12″W	Category C(S)	19401	Upload another image See more images
Main Street, Rutherford House				55°32′46″N 2°17′12″W	Category B	19402	Upload another image See more images
Main Street, Plough Hotel Including Outbuildings And Boundary Walls				55°32′44″N 2°17′13″W	Category B	19406	Upload another image
High Street, Valley Dene				55°32′48″N 2°16′28″W	Category C(S)	15411	Upload another image
High Street, Clifton Cottage				55°32′48″N 2°16′29″W	Category C(S)	15412	Upload another image
Main Street, Hillview Including Outbuildings				55°32′46″N 2°17′15″W	Category B	19433	Upload Photo
Main Street, Oxton Cottage				55°32′47″N 2°17′14″W	Category C(S)	19435	Upload Photo
5 Bowmont Terrace				55°32′50″N 2°17′13″W	Category C(S)	19441	Upload Photo
Kelso Road, Yetholm Hall Including Boundary Walls				55°32′53″N 2°17′14″W	Category B	19446	Upload Photo
Venchen Road, Rosebank				55°32′52″N 2°17′11″W	Category C(S)	19447	Upload Photo
Duncanhaugh, Cartshed And Granary				55°32′14″N 2°17′16″W	Category C(S)	19461	Upload Photo
Primsidemill, Cottage 3				55°31′57″N 2°17′50″W	Category B	19467	Upload Photo
3 Mount View				55°32′51″N 2°17′09″W	Category C(S)	19395	Upload Photo
Main Street, Paramount				55°32′46″N 2°17′12″W	Category B	19403	Upload another image
Morebattle Road, Romany House				55°32′32″N 2°17′18″W	Category B	19411	Upload another image
Main Street, Lintalee				55°32′37″N 2°17′20″W	Category C(S)	19413	Upload Photo
Main Street, Rose Cottage				55°32′41″N 2°17′17″W	Category C(S)	19418	Upload another image
High Street, Glenview				55°32′49″N 2°16′29″W	Category C(S)	15393	Upload another image
Main Street, Rowantree Cottage Including Boundary Walls				55°32′49″N 2°16′33″W	Category B	15397	Upload another image See more images
Montgomery Place, The Workshop				55°32′42″N 2°17′17″W	Category C(S)	19419	Upload another image
Main Street, Greenside				55°32′44″N 2°17′15″W	Category C(S)	19421	Upload Photo
Bowmont Terrace, Pinfarthings				55°32′49″N 2°17′13″W	Category C(S)	19439	Upload Photo
Bowmont Terrace, Arkle Cottage				55°32′50″N 2°17′13″W	Category C(S)	19440	Upload Photo
Cherrytrees, Walled Garden				55°33′24″N 2°18′17″W	Category B	19459	Upload Photo
Duncanhaugh Mill				55°32′13″N 2°17′16″W	Category C(S)	19462	Upload Photo
Main Street, Hall House And George Lees Butcher				55°32′43″N 2°17′14″W	Category B	19407	Upload another image
Grafton Bank, Grafton House Including Boundary Wall				55°32′42″N 2°17′15″W	Category C(S)	19409	Upload another image
Main Street, Mertoun Cottage				55°32′38″N 2°17′19″W	Category B	19414	Upload another image
High Street, Lintonrig				55°32′49″N 2°16′31″W	Category C(S)	15394	Upload another image
Main Street, K6 Telephone Kiosk	Kirk Yetholm			55°32′49″N 2°16′33″W	Category B	15396	Upload another image See more images
Mill Drive, 2 Waukford				55°32′54″N 2°16′39″W	Category C(S)	15406	Upload Photo
Main Street, Kirk Cottage				55°32′48″N 2°16′37″W	Category C(S)	15415	Upload another image
Main Street, The Cottage And Mr Poole				55°32′48″N 2°16′36″W	Category C(S)	15417	Upload Photo

== Key ==
The scheme for classifying buildings in Scotland is:

- Category A: "buildings of national or international importance, either architectural or historic; or fine, little-altered examples of some particular period, style or building type."
- Category B: "buildings of regional or more than local importance; or major examples of some particular period, style or building type, which may have been altered."
- Category C: "buildings of local importance; lesser examples of any period, style, or building type, as originally constructed or moderately altered; and simple traditional buildings which group well with other listed buildings."

In March 2016 there were 47,288 listed buildings in Scotland. Of these, 8% were Category A, and 50% were Category B, with the remaining 42% being Category C.
