= List of listed buildings in Campbeltown =

This is a list of listed buildings in the parish of Campbeltown in Argyll and Bute, Scotland.

== List ==
Name	Location	Date listed	Geo-coordinates	Notes	Category	LB number	Image
48 Shore Street, With Boundary Wall			55°25′23″N 5°36′09″W		C(S)	43134	Upload Photo
Witchburn Road And Dell Road, Municipal Offices, Including Boundary Walls And Garden			55°25′26″N 5°36′36″W		C(S)	43140	Upload Photo
Castlehill, Royal Bank Of Scotland, With Walls, Railings And Gates			55°25′23″N 5°36′24″W		C(S)	43056	Upload Photo
2 Castlehill And Lorne Street, With Railing, Boundary Wall, And Outbuilding			55°25′24″N 5°36′24″W		C(S)	43059	Upload Photo
1-7 (Odd Nos) Glebe Street And Big Kiln Street			55°25′25″N 5°36′28″W		C(S)	43069	Upload Photo
10-12 (Even Nos) Glebe Street, With Boundary Walls, Railing, And Outbuilding			55°25′28″N 5°36′30″W		B	43070	Upload another image
Hall Street, Between New Quay And Old Quay, Harbour Wall			55°25′26″N 5°36′09″W		C(S)	43073	Upload Photo
19-33 (Odd Nos) John Street, 1-21 (Odd Nos) Princes Street, 18 And 20 (Even Nos) Princes Street, 3 Queen Street And 20-30 (Even Nos) High Street Dalintober, With Boundary Walls And Gatepiers			55°25′43″N 5°36′16″W		B	43081	Upload another image
68 Kirk Street			55°25′21″N 5°36′09″W		B	43097	Upload Photo
9 Longrow, And Burnside Street, Galbraith & Cochrane			55°25′29″N 5°36′23″W		B	43102	Upload Photo
69-73 (Odd Nos) Longrow, Including Boundary Walls			55°25′33″N 5°36′28″W		B	43108	Upload another image
Low Askomil, Belmount, With Service Wing, Boundary Walls, Retaining Wall, And Gatepiers			55°25′41″N 5°35′28″W		C(S)	43110	Upload Photo
Low Askomil, Hawthorne, Including Boundary Walls And Gates			55°25′41″N 5°35′30″W		B	43112	Upload Photo
40-48 (Even Nos) Main Street And 1-21 (Odd Nos) Longrow South			55°25′27″N 5°36′20″W		B	43124	Upload another image
6-34 (Even Nos) Argyll Street, Barochan Place, Including Wall, Wash-Houses, And Railings			55°25′22″N 5°36′20″W		B	43051	Upload Photo
Low Askomil, Rosemount, With Gardener's Cottage, Conservatory, Coach-House, And Boundary Walls			55°25′41″N 5°35′34″W		B	22938	Upload Photo
New Quay Street, Highland Kirk (Church Of Scotland), With Boundary Walls And Gate Piers			55°25′17″N 5°36′15″W		B	22942	Upload another image See more images
Kirk Street And St John Street, Highland Church Hall (Formerly Lowland Church)			55°25′24″N 5°36′13″W		B	22944	Upload another image
Kirk Street, The Manse, With Garage, Gatepiers, And Boundary Walls			55°25′23″N 5°36′10″W		B	22945	Upload Photo
54-56 (Even Nos) Kirk Street, With Gatepiers And Gate			55°25′22″N 5°36′11″W		C(S)	22947	Upload Photo
New Quay Street And Kilkerran Road, Pensioners Row			55°25′22″N 5°36′05″W		C(S)	22952	Upload Photo
Kilkerran Road, Courthill, With Coach House, Boundary Walls, Gates, And Gatepiers			55°25′18″N 5°36′03″W		B	22955	Upload Photo
Kilkerran Road, North Park And Tudor Court, With Garage, Outbuildings, Boundary Walls, Gates And Gatepiers			55°25′11″N 5°35′54″W		B	22958	Upload Photo
St John Street And Hall Street, Public Library And Museum, With Librarian's House, Garden, Railings, Gates, And Gatepiers			55°25′26″N 5°36′11″W		A	22964	Upload another image
2-14 (Even Nos) Main Street, Maclean Place, With Outbuilding			55°25′29″N 5°36′17″W		B	22914	Upload Photo
50-52 (Even Nos) Main Street And Cross Street			55°25′27″N 5°36′21″W		B	22917	Upload Photo
Lossit Home Farm			55°25′11″N 5°44′23″W		C(S)	4918	Upload Photo
Lodge And Gate Kilellan Policies			55°22′26″N 5°39′33″W		C(S)	4919	Upload Photo
Davaar Lighthouse			55°25′41″N 5°32′26″W		B	4920	Upload another image See more images
Cross Street, Feathers Inn			55°25′27″N 5°36′23″W		B	43061	Upload another image
15 To 53 Dalaruan Street, Dalaruan Terrace, With Boundary Walls And Gates			55°25′52″N 5°36′35″W		B	43063	Upload Photo
Gallowhill Road, Gallowhill Farm, Including Boundary Walls And Gatepiers			55°25′28″N 5°36′43″W		B	43066	Upload Photo
Hall Street And Old Quay Head, Christian Institute			55°25′28″N 5°36′14″W		C(S)	43072	Upload another image See more images
High Askomil, Dunara, With Outhouses, Retaining Wall, Boundary Walls, Gates, And Gatepiers			55°25′44″N 5°35′31″W		C(S)	43077	Upload Photo
Kilkerran Road, Knockbay, With Boundary Walls, Gates And Gatepiers			55°25′03″N 5°35′34″W		C(S)	43085	Upload Photo
Kilkerran Road, Rockwood, With Outbuilding, Boundary Walls, Gates And Gatepiers			55°25′07″N 5°35′44″W		B	43089	Upload Photo
1-3 (Odd Nos) Longrow, New Quay Chandlers			55°25′28″N 5°36′23″W		C(S)	43100	Upload Photo
23 To 29 Longrow, Including Outbuildings			55°25′30″N 5°36′25″W		B	43105	Upload Photo
Low Askomil, Craigard, With Boundary Walls And Railings			55°25′42″N 5°35′16″W		B	43111	Upload Photo
North Shore Street, Sandbank			55°25′43″N 5°36′02″W		C(S)	43127	Upload Photo
Saddell Street, Former Benmore Distillery (West Coast Motors), Including Warehouse, Kiln, Offices, Cooperage, And Boundary Wall			55°25′46″N 5°36′25″W		B	43129	Upload another image
Kinloch Public Park, To South Of Swimming Baths, Statue Of William Mackinnon			55°56′28″N 4°35′02″W		B	24899	Upload another image
Low Askomil, Rockbank, Including Boundary Walls, Gatepiers, Retaining Walls And Outbuildings			55°25′41″N 5°35′37″W		B	22937	Upload Photo
Low Askomil, Seaside, With Boundary Wall, Gatepiers, And Outbuilding			55°25′36″N 5°34′58″W		C(S)	22939	Upload Photo
Argyll Street And New Quay Street, Kirklea, (Caber Feidh) Including Boundary Walls			55°25′19″N 5°36′13″W		B	22943	Upload Photo
58-60 (Even Nos) Kirk Street, With Walls And Outhouse			55°25′22″N 5°36′11″W		B	22948	Upload Photo
Hall Street, the Wee Picture House			55°25′26″N 5°36′12″W		A	22965	Upload another image
Main Street, Old Post Office			55°25′25″N 5°36′21″W		C(S)	22912	Upload Photo
5 Bolgam Street, Former Gaol And Courthouse			55°25′28″N 5°36′19″W		B	22915	Upload Photo
Castlehill, Drumfin And Former Lowland Church Manse, With Walls, Railings, And Gatepiers			55°25′23″N 5°36′25″W		B	22920	Upload Photo
High Street Dalintober, Springfield House, With Stables And Gatepiers			55°25′45″N 5°35′59″W		B	22933	Upload Photo
Low Askomil, Lilybank, With Retaining Walls, And Gatepiers			55°25′41″N 5°35′39″W		C(S)	22936	Upload Photo
Dell Road, Stanley Place, Including Railings			55°25′28″N 5°36′37″W		B	43064	Upload Photo
Esplanade, War Memorial			55°25′38″N 5°36′16″W		C(S)	43065	Upload another image
Kilkerran Road, Former Lifeboat House, With Boundary Wall And Gatepiers			55°25′05″N 5°35′39″W		B	43086	Upload another image
15-17 (Odd Nos) Longrow, Hardware Stores			55°25′29″N 5°36′24″W		C(S)	43103	Upload Photo
Main Street, Argyll Arms Hotel			55°25′26″N 5°36′22″W		B	43121	Upload another image
North Shore Street, Dalintober Quay			55°25′41″N 5°36′02″W		B	43126	Upload Photo
Argyll Street, St Kiaran's Episcopal Church, Including Boundary Wall, Gates And Gatepiers			55°25′24″N 5°36′19″W		C(S)	43048	Upload another image
64 And 66 Kirk Street, With Outbuilding			55°25′21″N 5°36′09″W		B	22949	Upload Photo
Kilkerran Road, Stronvaar, With Outbuildings, Railings, Boundary Walls And Gatepiers			55°25′16″N 5°36′02″W		B	22956	Upload Photo
Kilkerran Road, East Cliff, With Garage, Boundary Wall, Gates And Gatepiers			55°25′07″N 5°35′46″W		B	22960	Upload Photo
Kilkerran Road, Kilkerran Cottage With Gatepiers, Outbuildings, And Castle Remains			55°25′00″N 5°35′22″W		C(S)	22961	Upload Photo
58-62 (Even Nos) Main Street			55°25′25″N 5°36′22″W		B	22919	Upload Photo
Former Lowland Church Manse, Off Castlehill			55°25′23″N 5°36′30″W		C(S)	22921	Upload Photo
6-10 (Even Nos) Union Street			55°25′27″N 5°36′22″W		B	22922	Upload Photo
St John Street, St Kieran's Chapel House, (Roman Catholic), Including Boundary Wall, Gates, And Gatepiers			55°25′23″N 5°36′15″W		C(S)	43131	Upload another image
18-24 (Even Nos) Shore Street, With Boundary Wall			55°25′26″N 5°36′14″W		B	43133	Upload Photo
Square Between Union Street And Burnside, Warehouse			55°25′28″N 5°36′23″W		B	43135	Upload Photo
34-36 (Even Nos) Union Street			55°25′29″N 5°36′21″W		C(S)	43138	Upload Photo
Witchburn Road, Former Cottage Hospital, With Steps, Retaining Wall, And Boundary Walls			55°25′23″N 5°36′48″W		C(S)	43139	Upload Photo
Castlehill And Argyll Street, White Hart Hotel			55°25′24″N 5°36′23″W		B	43058	Upload another image
Glebe Street And Well Close, Springbank Distillery			55°25′32″N 5°36′33″W		B	43067	Upload another image
Hall Street, Royal Avenue Mansions			55°25′27″N 5°36′14″W		B	43074	Upload Photo
47-49 (Odd Nos) Longrow			55°25′32″N 5°36′27″W		C(S)	43107	Upload Photo
83-103 (Odd Nos) Millknowe Road With Boundary Wall, Retaining Wall, And Steps			55°25′49″N 5°36′43″W		C(S)	43125	Upload Photo
Ralston Road, Police Station, With Boundary Walls And Gatepiers			55°25′21″N 5°36′25″W		C(S)	43128	Upload Photo
Argyll Street And New Quay Street, Muneroy, Annfield And Benroy, With Boundary Walls And Gates			55°25′20″N 5°36′11″W		C(S)	43047	Upload Photo
Big Kiln Street, Former Free Church School			55°25′24″N 5°36′26″W		B	43053	Upload another image
Kirk Street, New Quay Street And Shore Street, Craigdhu Mansions, With Wash-House, Boundary Wall, And Gates			55°25′21″N 5°36′08″W		B	22950	Upload Photo
Lochend Street, Warehouse			55°25′40″N 5°36′30″W		B	22966	Upload another image
Castlehill, Fleming's Land, With Wash-Houses, Garden Walls, And Gates			55°25′23″N 5°36′23″W		B	22911	Upload Photo
Main Street, Town Hall, Including Lamp Standards			55°25′26″N 5°36′21″W		B	22918	Upload another image
38-48 (Even Nos) Longrow			55°25′32″N 5°36′25″W		B	22926	Upload Photo
Millknowe Road, Former Hazelburn Distillery, Including Tenement, Managers Offices, Warehouses, Gatepier, And Boundary Wall			55°25′42″N 5°36′35″W		B	22929	Upload Photo
Low Askomil, Springbank House, With Retaining And Boundary Walls, Gatepiers And Summerhouse			55°25′42″N 5°35′45″W		B	22934	Upload Photo
Kilkivan Chapel (St. Kevin's) Kilkivan Burial Ground			55°25′07″N 5°42′44″W		B	4916	Upload Photo
Lussa Hyrdo Electric Scheme, Lussa Power Station, Including Boundary Walls			55°28′34″N 5°35′05″W		B	51689	Upload another image
St John Street And Stewart Road, St Kieran's Primary School, With Boundary Wall, Railings, Playshelters, Gates, And Gatepiers			55°25′21″N 5°36′21″W		C(S)	43132	Upload Photo
Big Kiln Street, Heritage Centre, (Formerly Lorne Street Free Gaelic Church) With Hall, Boundary Walls, Railings, Gates, And Gatepiers			55°25′24″N 5°36′29″W		C(S)	43054	Upload another image See more images
Glengyle Road, Former Glengyle Distillery, Including Warehouses And Office Building			55°25′38″N 5°36′41″W		B	43071	Upload another image
High Askomil, Airdaluinn With Railings, Gatepiers, Retaining And Boundary Walls			55°25′45″N 5°35′45″W		B	43075	Upload Photo
High Street Dalintober, Braefoot House, With Railings, Gate, Boundary Walls, And Outhouses			55°25′45″N 5°36′04″W		C(S)	43078	Upload Photo
Kilkerran Road, Markland, With Gate, Retaining Wall And Boundary Walls			55°25′13″N 5°35′58″W		C(S)	43087	Upload Photo
Low Askomil, Beach Hill, With Outbuildings, Garage, Boundary Walls, And Gatepiers			55°25′42″N 5°35′24″W		B	43109	Upload Photo
Low Askomil, 1-3 (Inclusive Nos) St Clair Terrace, With Boundary Walls And Gates			55°25′43″N 5°35′54″W		B	43120	Upload Photo
31 Argyll Street, Barochan House, With Boundary Wall And Railings			55°25′21″N 5°36′14″W		B	43050	Upload Photo
High Askomil, Bellgrove, With Stable, Laundry, Outbuildings, Boundary Walls, Gates, And Gatepiers			55°25′45″N 5°35′23″W		A	22940	Upload Photo
52 Kirk Street, Cnocbaan, With Boundary Wall And Gate			55°25′23″N 5°36′12″W		B	22946	Upload Photo
Kilkerran Road, 'Ailsa', With Railing And Garden Wall			55°25′20″N 5°36′03″W		B	22954	Upload Photo
Kilkerran Road, South Park, With Outbuildings, Boundary Walls, Gates, And Gatepiers			55°25′08″N 5°35′50″W		B	22959	Upload Photo
Kilkerran Road, Kilkerran Churchyard And Cemetery, Including Calen Maceachern's Cross And Cristin's Cross, Boundary Walls, Entrance Gates And Gatepiers			55°24′55″N 5°35′29″W		B	22962	Upload Photo
Whinhill House, Including Outbuildings, Gates, And Gatepiers			55°25′35″N 5°37′19″W		C(S)	22963	Upload Photo
Old Quay Head, Campbeltown Cross			55°25′29″N 5°36′14″W		A	22913	Upload another image
Kilchrist Castle			55°24′04″N 5°38′49″W		B	4921	Upload another image
11-13 (Odd Nos) Union Street			55°25′28″N 5°36′23″W		C(S)	43136	Upload Photo
High Street Dalintober, Glen Scotia Distillery (Formerly Scotia Distillery) With Warehouses			55°25′46″N 5°36′16″W		B	43079	Upload another image
7-11 (Odd Nos) Kirk Street			55°25′26″N 5°36′18″W		B	43091	Upload Photo
65 Kirk Street			55°25′26″N 5°36′17″W		C(S)	43095	Upload Photo
70 Kirk Street And New Quay Street, Ivybank, With Boundary Wall			55°25′21″N 5°36′09″W		B	43099	Upload Photo
5-7 (Odd Nos) Longrow, Streetwise			55°25′29″N 5°36′23″W		B	43101	Upload Photo
41-45 (Odd Nos) Longrow, Including Boundary Wall			55°25′31″N 5°36′26″W		B	43106	Upload Photo
Main Street, The Club			55°25′25″N 5°36′23″W		B	43122	Upload Photo
St John Street, St Kieran's Chapel, (Roman Catholic), Including Boundary Wall, Gates, And Gatepiers			55°25′23″N 5°36′16″W		C(S)	43130	Upload another image
27-29 (Odd Nos) Argyll Street, With Gate And Gatepiers			55°25′21″N 5°36′15″W		B	43049	Upload Photo
Balegreggan House And The Stables, Including Boundary Wall			55°26′05″N 5°36′07″W		C(S)	43052	Upload Photo
2-4 Kilkerran Road And New Quay Street, Including Boundary Wall And Gate			55°25′20″N 5°36′08″W		C(S)	22951	Upload Photo
16-20 ( Even Nos) Main Street And 1-3 (Odd Nos) Bolgam Street			55°25′28″N 5°36′19″W		B	22916	Upload Photo
12-18 (Even Nos) Burnside Street			55°25′28″N 5°36′26″W		B	22923	Upload Photo
11-13 (Odd Nos) Longrow And Burnside Street, Corner Shop			55°25′29″N 5°36′24″W		B	22924	Upload Photo
61-67 (Odd Nos) Longrow, Including Boundary Wall			55°25′33″N 5°36′28″W		B	22927	Upload Photo
81 Millknowe Road, With Boundary Wall			55°25′48″N 5°36′43″W		C(S)	22930	Upload Photo
Kilchousland Chapel (St. Constantine's) Chapel Kilchousland Burial Ground			55°26′26″N 5°33′22″W		B	4915	Upload another image
Oatfield House			55°24′05″N 5°39′51″W		B	4922	Upload Photo
30-32 (Even Nos) Union Street			55°25′29″N 5°36′21″W		B	43137	Upload another image
Castlehill, Sheriff Court House, With Boundary Wall			55°25′22″N 5°36′26″W		B	43057	Upload another image
Cross Street, Wee Toon Lounge Bar			55°25′26″N 5°36′22″W		C(S)	43062	Upload Photo
13-15 (Odd Nos) Kirk Street			55°25′26″N 5°36′18″W		C(S)	43092	Upload Photo
49 Kirk Street And St John Street, With Boundary Wall			55°25′24″N 5°36′12″W		C(S)	43094	Upload Photo
32 Kirk Street			55°25′25″N 5°36′16″W		B	43096	Upload Photo
19-21 (Odd Nos) Longrow, Clydesdale Bank, With Railings And Gatepiers			55°25′30″N 5°36′24″W		B	43104	Upload Photo
Main Street, Royal Hotel			55°25′30″N 5°36′15″W		C(S)	43123	Upload another image
Longrow, Lorne And Lowland Church (Church Of Scotland), With Hall, Boundary Walls, Gates And Gatepiers			55°25′29″N 5°36′30″W		B	22925	Upload another image
Tarbert Road, Drumore House, Including Boundary Walls And Gatepiers			55°25′56″N 5°36′42″W		C(S)	22931	Upload Photo
High Street Dalintober, The Hall, With Boundary Walls And Gatepiers			55°25′45″N 5°36′02″W		C(S)	22932	Upload another image
Lossit House			55°25′09″N 5°44′27″W		B	4917	Upload Photo
Witchburn Road, Entrance Arch To Former Poorhouse (Witchburn House)			55°25′23″N 5°36′42″W		C(S)	43141	Upload Photo
Burnside Street, Burnside Bar			55°25′28″N 5°36′24″W		C(S)	43055	Upload Photo
Cross Street And Burnside Street, Commercial Inn			55°25′27″N 5°36′24″W		B	43060	Upload another image
Glebe Street, Former Springside Distillery, Duty Free Warehouse No 1			55°25′27″N 5°36′29″W		B	43068	Upload Photo
High Askomil, Auchinlee, With Boundary Walls, Gate, And Gatepiers			55°25′45″N 5°35′27″W		B	43076	Upload Photo
High Street Dalintober, Springfield Terrace, Including Boundary Walls And Gatepiers			55°25′44″N 5°36′02″W		C(S)	43080	Upload Photo
Kilkerran Road, Redholme, With Outbuilding, Boundary Walls, Gates And Gatepiers			55°25′10″N 5°35′52″W		A	43088	Upload Photo
Kinloch Road And Lochend Street, Former Mission Hall, Including Boundary Wall, Railings, And Gates			55°25′38″N 5°36′28″W		B	43090	Upload Photo
17-19 (Odd Nos) Kirk Street			55°25′26″N 5°36′17″W		C(S)	43093	Upload Photo
Low Askomil, Seabank, Including Boundary Walls And Gatepiers			55°25′43″N 5°35′49″W		B	43119	Upload Photo
Argyll Street, Episcopal Church Rectory, With Boundary Wall, Gates And Gatepiers			55°25′23″N 5°36′18″W		B	43046	Upload Photo
High Askomil, Rothmar, With Garage, Terrace, Boundary And Retaining Walls, Gates And Gatepiers			55°25′44″N 5°35′35″W		A	22941	Upload Photo
Hutcheon Road, Limecraigs House, Including, Pavilions, Steading, Stables Cottage, Boundary Walls, And Gatepiers			55°25′06″N 5°36′02″W		C(S)	22957	Upload Photo
Castlehill, Castlehill Mansions, (Formerly Lowland Church Of Scotland) With Boundary Walls, Railings, And Gatepiers			55°25′21″N 5°36′27″W		B	22910	Upload another image
Low Askomil, Fairview, With Boundary Walls And Gatepiers			55°25′41″N 5°35′40″W		B	22935	Upload Photo

== Key ==
The scheme for classifying buildings in Scotland is:

- Category A: "buildings of national or international importance, either architectural or historic; or fine, little-altered examples of some particular period, style or building type."
- Category B: "buildings of regional or more than local importance; or major examples of some particular period, style or building type, which may have been altered."
- Category C: "buildings of local importance; lesser examples of any period, style, or building type, as originally constructed or moderately altered; and simple traditional buildings which group well with other listed buildings."

In March 2016 there were 47,288 listed buildings in Scotland. Of these, 8% were Category A, and 50% were Category B, with the remaining 42% being Category C.

== See also ==
- List of listed buildings in Argyll and Bute
