= Harry Edward Clifford =

Scottish architect (1852–1932)

- Clifford circa 1900
- Born: Henry Edward Clifford; 12 September 1852; North Naparima, Trinidad
- Died: 14 October 1932 (aged 80); Campbeltown, Scotland
- Occupation: Architect
- Awards: FRIBA

Henry Edward Clifford FRIBA (12 September 1852 – 14 October 1932) was a Scottish architect, prominent in the late 19th and early 20th centuries. His design genre was wide, from churches to schools to golf clubhouses, but he was focussed in the Glasgow area and the west coast of Scotland.

== Early life ==
Clifford's family was originally from Wexford, Ireland, but settled in Trinidad not long after its capture in 1797.

Clifford was born on 12 September 1852 at Woodbrook estate in North Naparima, Trinidad, into a Scots-Irish family. He was the second son and fourth child of F. Henry Clifford, a sugar planter, and Rebecca Anderson. He and his siblings were raised in Glasgow by their single mother after the death of their father in 1859.

== Career ==
In 1867, Clifford was articled to John Burnet for five years. He remained with him for an additional five years as draughtsman.

Clifford began his own practice, firstly at 113 West Regent Street in Glasgow, then at 196 St Vincent Street.

He achieved national fame in 1901, when he won he Glasgow Royal Infirmary competition, but an internal disagreement led to its commission instead being given to James Miller.

In 1909, Clifford began a partnership with his principal assistant Thomas Lunan, who was connected in the golfing world; however, Lunan fought in the Great War and returned with post-traumatic stress disorder and found himself unable to work. Clifford bought him out and continued alone.

Clifford retired on medical advice in December 1923. His practice was merged with that of Watson & Salmond.

=== Selected works ===
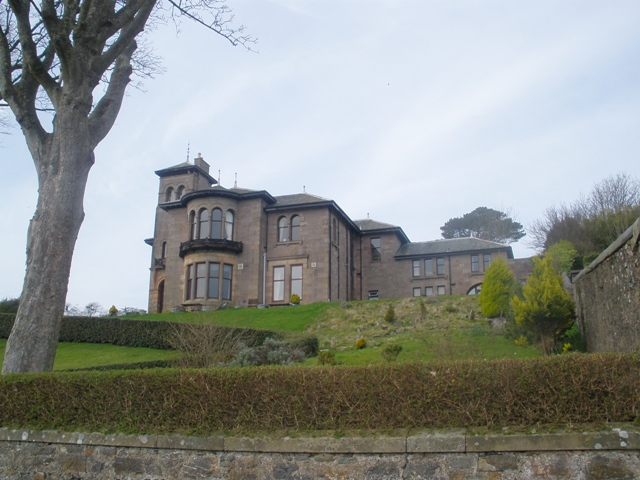
Craigard, Low Askomil, Campbeltown 1882

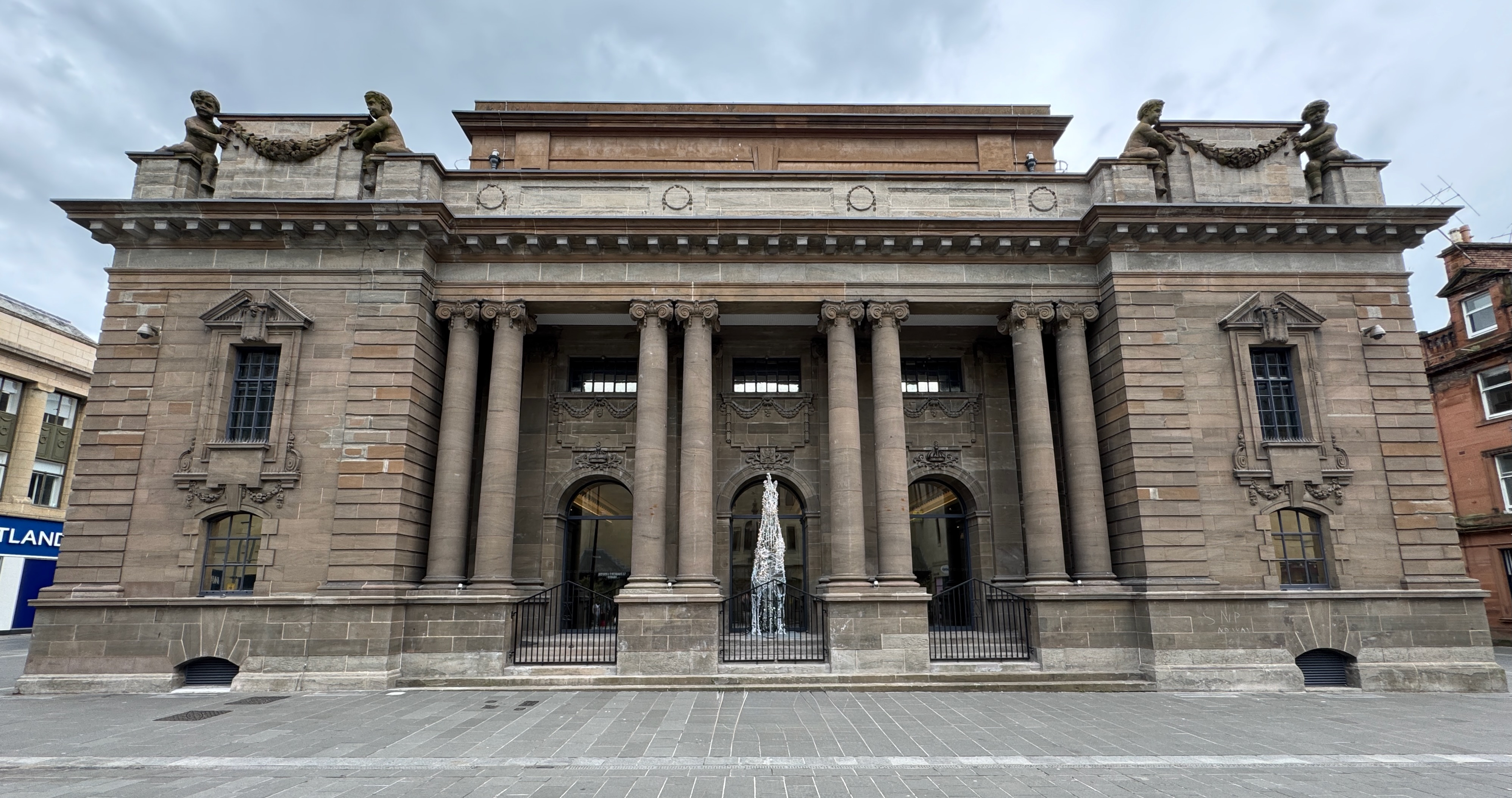
Perth City Hall, Clifford's design with Thomas Melville Lunan, pictured in 2024

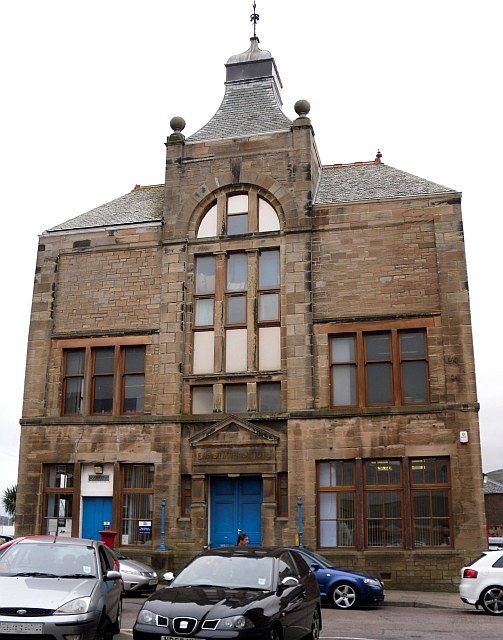
Christian Institute, Campbeltown 1885-87

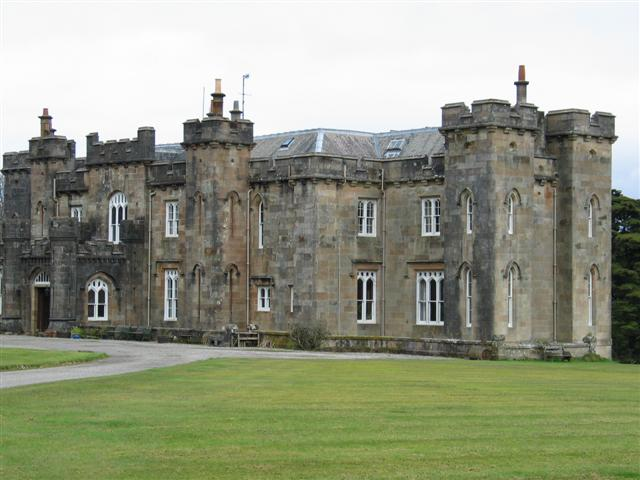
Torrisdale Castle north wing 1900, south wing 1910

- Bellahouston Park gate lodge
- Craigard (house), Campbeltown 1882
- Rectory for St Kiaran's Episcopal Church, Campbeltown 1885
- Royal Troon Golf Club clubhouse 1886
- Victoria Holl, Kinloch Road, Cambeltown 1886
- Mission Hall, Lochend, Campbeltown 1886
- Kiloran Church, Carradale 1887
- Christian Institute, Campbeltown 1887
- Pollokshields Burgh Hall 1890
- Ladies’ Golf Clubhouse, Machrihanish 1890
- Killean Home Farm Buildings 1890
- Kirn Pier buildings 1895
- Club, Main Street, Campbeltown 1895
- Auchinelee (house), Campbeltown 1896
- Knockbay (house), Campbeltown 1896
- Redholme (house), Campbeltown 1896
- The Hall, Dalintober 1896 (alterations)
- Redcliffe (house), Kilkerran Road, Campbeltown 1897
- Bellview (Ravescraig) (house), Campbeltown 1897
- Norwood (house), Campbeltown 1898
- Eastcliffe (house), Kilkerran Road 1898 (rebuilt)
- Dalintober Infant School 1899
- The Grammar School, Campbeltown 1899
- Lochhead Distillery Warehouse, Cambeltown 1899 (demolished)
- Dunlossit (house), Machrihanish 1900
- Torrisdale Castle, Carradale 1900 (north wing)
- Swallowholme (house), Machrihanish 1901
- Glasgow Victoria Infirmary 1902
- Campbeltown and Kintyre District Combination Hospital 1903 (additions)
- Hall for Highland Parish Church, Kirk Street, Campbeltown 1904
- St Kieran’s Primary School, Campbeltown 1906
- Torrisdale Castle, Carradale 1910 (south wing)
- Masonic Lodge, St John’s Street, Campbeltown 1912 (additions)
- Perth City Hall 1914
- Campbeltown Cottage Hospital 1914 (additions)
- Hall for Lorne Street Church, Campeltown

== Personal life ==
Clifford's mother was from Campbeltown, Argyll and Bute, and it was there that he met his wife, Alice Gibson, who was twenty years his junior. They married on 7 December 1904 at Longrow Free Church in Campbeltown. Their only child, William Henry Morton Clifford, was born in 1909.

In the early 1890s, Clifford built himself a weekend house, namely Redclyffe in Troon, but he lived with his mother and sisters in Pollokshields during the week.

Upon retiring in 1923, he bought a two-acre plot in the English town of Reigate, Surrey, on which he built a "substantial house" which he also named Woodbrook.

He came out of retirement to design Crosshill, at Wendover, for friends from Campbeltown.

Clifford's health improved somewhat, but his fortune was diminished by the 1929 Wall Street Crash and the subsequent impact on the London Stock Exchange. He suffered a severe heart attack in July 1930, and his wife endured phlebitis the following year.

== Death ==
Due to nursing costs, Clifford put Woodbrook on the market, but before it could be sold he died of a stroke on 14 October 1932, aged 80. Alice died the following summer.

Clifford was buried in Kilkerran Cemetery in Campbeltown.
