= List of listed buildings in Lochmaben, Dumfries and Galloway =

This is a list of listed buildings in the civil parish of Lochmaben in Dumfries and Galloway, Scotland.

== List ==
| Name | Location | Date listed | Grid ref. (Note: Sometimes known as OSGB36, the grid reference (where provided) is based on the British national grid reference system used by the Ordnance Survey. • "Guide to National Grid". Ordnance Survey. • "Get-a-map". Ordnance Survey.) | Geo-coordinates | Notes | LB number (Note: Historic Environment Scotland assign a unique alphanumeric identifier to each designated site in Scotland, for listed buildings this always begins with "LB", for example "LB12345".) | Image |
|---|---|---|---|---|---|---|---|
| Castle Street, Bruce Arms | | | | 55°07′43″N 3°26′31″W | Category B | 37538 | Upload another image See more images |
| High Street, Lochmaben Parish Church Boundary Wall and Gatepiers (St Magdalene's) | | | | 55°07′35″N 3°26′19″W | Category A | 37539 | Upload another image See more images |
| 61 (Castle Grove), 63, 65 High Street (also known as 1, 2, 3 Church Place) | | | | 55°07′36″N 3°26′21″W | Category B | 37548 | Upload Photo |
| 34 High Street, The Old Schoolhouse | | | | 55°07′41″N 3°26′24″W | Category B | 37553 | Upload Photo |
| Corncockle Farmhouse | | | | 55°09′57″N 3°26′27″W | Category B | 9968 | Upload Photo |
| 5, 7 High Street | | | | 55°07′44″N 3°26′31″W | Category B | 37542 | Upload Photo |
| 4 High Street | | | | 55°07′45″N 3°26′30″W | Category B | 37549 | Upload Photo |
| 6 High Street, Balcarres | | | | 55°07′45″N 3°26′28″W | Category B | 37550 | Upload Photo |
| Halleaths Lodge at Stables | | | | 55°07′35″N 3°25′05″W | Category C(S) | 9972 | Upload Photo |
| Kinnel Bridge | | | | 55°09′04″N 3°25′50″W | Category A | 9950 | Upload another image |
| Lochmaben Market Cross | | | | 55°07′44″N 3°26′37″W | Category B | 37554 | Upload another image See more images |
| St Mary Magdalene's Churchyard | | | | 55°07′42″N 3°26′33″W | Category B | 37555 | Upload Photo |
| 9 Bruce Street including Oliver's Shop | | | | 55°07′45″N 3°25′49″W | Category B | 37533 | Upload Photo |
| Woodfoot Farmhouse | | | | 55°05′04″N 3°25′45″W | Category C(S) | 9967 | Upload Photo |
| Elshieshields Tower and adjoining House, Walled Garden and Gatepiers at South | | | | 55°09′03″N 3°27′47″W | Category A | 9970 | Upload Photo |
| 41 High Street | | | | 55°07′40″N 3°26′26″W | Category C(S) | 37546 | Upload Photo |
| High Street, Victoria House (Former Free Church Manse) | | | | 55°07′37″N 3°26′24″W | Category C(S) | 37547 | Upload Photo |
| Heck Village Lake House and detached Outbuilding | | | | 55°06′28″N 3°25′11″W | Category C(S) | 9948 | Upload Photo |
| High Street, Tolbooth including Iron Lamps | | | | 55°07′44″N 3°26′30″W | Category A | 37541 | Upload another image |
| 17, 19 High Street | | | | 55°07′43″N 3°26′29″W | Category C(S) | 37544 | Upload Photo |
| 21 High Street, Royal Bank Of Scotland | | | | 55°07′43″N 3°26′29″W | Category C(S) | 37545 | Upload Photo |
| 12 (Kismet), 14 Bruce Street | | | | 55°07′43″N 3°26′37″W | Category B | 37536 | Upload Photo |
| Bruce Street, Old Bank House | | | | 55°07′43″N 3°26′38″W | Category B | 37537 | Upload Photo |
| Halleaths Home Farm, House and Steading | | | | 55°07′38″N 3°25′08″W | Category B | 9944 | Upload Photo |
| Heck Village, Heck Hill Farm Steading Row to Roadside including Cottages | | | | 55°06′27″N 3°25′07″W | Category C(S) | 9947 | Upload Photo |
| Kinnel Bridge, Todhillmuir Cottage | | | | 55°09′05″N 3°25′49″W | Category C(S) | 9951 | Upload another image |
| Shaw Bridge | | | | 55°09′46″N 3°26′52″W | Category B | 9956 | Upload Photo |
| Mayfield House and Outbuildings | | | | 55°07′38″N 3°25′53″W | Category C(S) | 9953 | Upload Photo |
| 10 High Street, Dalveen | | | | 55°07′44″N 3°26′28″W | Category C(S) | 37551 | Upload Photo |
| 6 Bruce Street. Former Manse and Walled Garden | | | | 55°07′44″N 3°26′35″W | Category B | 37534 | Upload Photo |
| 8 Bruce Street, Crown Hotel | | | | 55°07′43″N 3°26′36″W | Category C(S) | 37535 | Upload another image See more images |
| Spedlins Tower | | | | 55°10′26″N 3°25′06″W | Category A | 9965 | Upload another image See more images |
| Elshieshields Bridge | | | | 55°09′09″N 3°27′50″W | Category B | 9969 | Upload another image |
| Millhouse Bridge Village, Millhouse Bridge | | | | 55°09′21″N 3°24′24″W | Category A | 9954 | Upload Photo |
| Moss-Side Cottages | | | | 55°07′09″N 3°25′02″W | Category C(S) | 9955 | Upload Photo |
| High Street, Statue of Robert Bruce | | | | 55°07′44″N 3°26′29″W | Category B | 37540 | Upload another image |
| 15 High Street, Kings Arms Hotel | | | | 55°07′43″N 3°26′29″W | Category C(S) | 37543 | Upload another image See more images |
| 14 High Street, Library and Freemason's Hall | | | | 55°07′44″N 3°26′28″W | Category C(S) | 37552 | Upload Photo |
| Vendaceburn | | | | 55°07′03″N 3°26′24″W | Category B | 9966 | Upload Photo |
| Halleaths former Stables (Houses and SSEB Stores and Workshops) | | | | 55°07′37″N 3°25′02″W | Category A | 9971 | Upload Photo |
| Halleaths, Lodge at Innerfield | | | | 55°07′26″N 3°25′09″W | Category B | 9973 | Upload Photo |

== Key ==
The scheme for classifying buildings in Scotland is:

- Category A: "buildings of national or international importance, either architectural or historic; or fine, little-altered examples of some particular period, style or building type."
- Category B: "buildings of regional or more than local importance; or major examples of some particular period, style or building type, which may have been altered."
- Category C: "buildings of local importance; lesser examples of any period, style, or building type, as originally constructed or moderately altered; and simple traditional buildings which group well with other listed buildings."

In March 2016 there were 47,288 listed buildings in Scotland. Of these, 8% were Category A, and 50% were Category B, with the remaining 42% being Category C.
