= Campbeltown Sheriff Court =

Judicial building in Campbeltown, Scotland

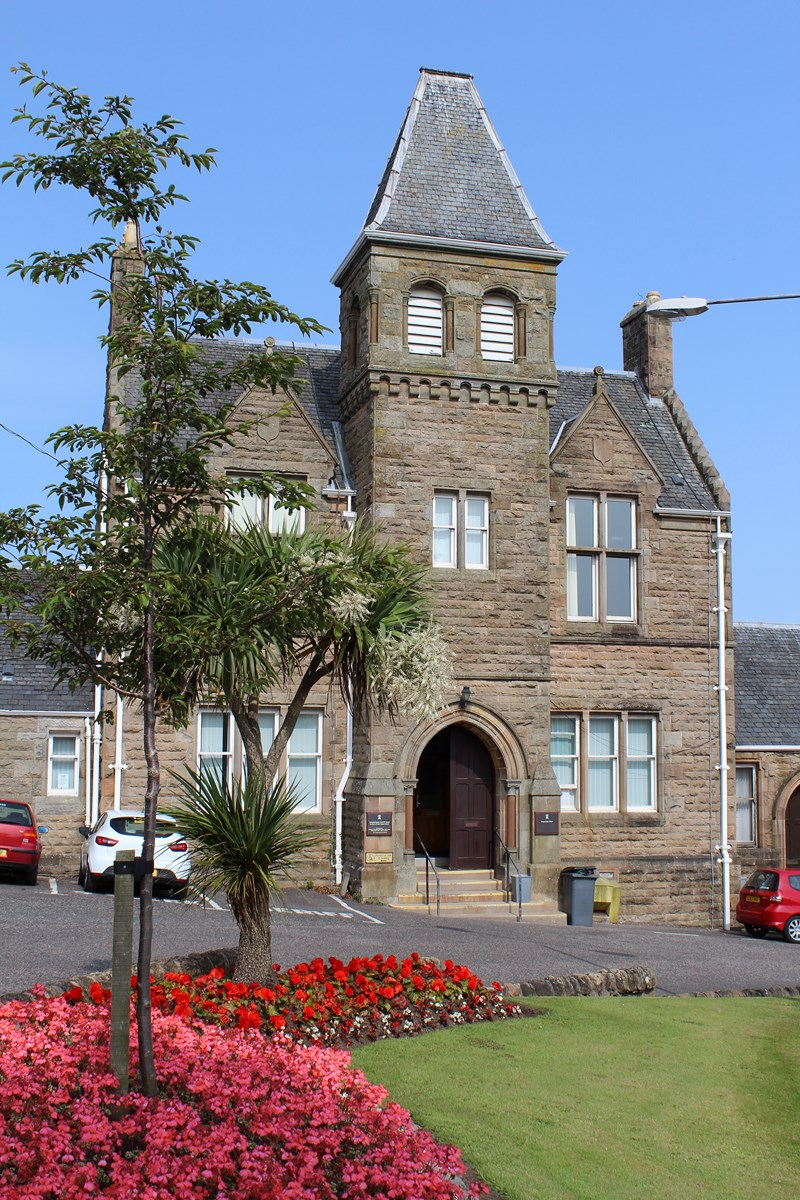
- The building in 2013

- Shown within Argyll and Bute
- 55.4228°N 5.6073°W
- Location: Castlehill, Campbeltown

History
- Built: 1871

Site notes
- Architect: David Cousin
- Architectural style: Gothic Revival style

Listed Building – Category C(S)
- Official name: Campbeltown Sheriff Court and Justice Of The Peace Court including boundary wall, Castlehill, Campbeltown
- Designated: 28 March 1996
- Reference no.: LB43057

Campbeltown Sheriff Court is a judicial building on Castlehill in Campbeltown, Argyll and Bute in Scotland. The building, which continues to be used as a courthouse, is a Category C listed building.

== History ==
During the first half of the 19th century, court hearings took place at Campbeltown Town Hall in Main Street. However, in the mid-19th century, court officials decided that a dedicated courthouse was needed. The burgh council converted a mid-18th-century building at 5 Bolgam Street for judicial use but was unable to reach agreement with court officials over the annual rent. Court officials decided instead to commission a new building: the site they selected was appropriately placed, close to the old prison on Castlehill.

The new building was designed by David Cousin in the Gothic Revival style, built by a local contractor, Robert Weir, in rubble masonry and was completed in 1871. The design involved a symmetrical main frontage of three bays facing onto Castlehill. The central bay, which was slightly projected forward, was formed by a three-stage tower. There was an arched doorway flanked by colonettes supporting a moulded surround in the first stage, a pair of narrow windows in the second stage, and a belfry with louvred openings in the third stage, all surmounted by a mansard roof. The outer bays were fenestrated by tripartite mullioned windows on the ground floor and by bipartite mullioned and tramsomed windows with pediments and finials on the first floor. Internally, the principal rooms were the courtroom on the first floor, which featured a vaulted ceiling, and two prison cells.

A single storey wing to the west formed part of the original design and a single storey wing to the east was added in 1903.

In March 1973, Paul and Linda McCartney appeared in the court, accused of illegal cultivation of cannabis at their property, High Park Farm near Campbeltown: they were both found guilty and were required to pay £100 fines.

An extensive programme of refurbishment works, involving replacement of the boilers, was completed in 2022, enabling the building to continue to serve as the venue for sheriff court hearings in the area.

== See also ==
- List of listed buildings in Campbeltown
