= Torrisdale =

Torrisdale is the name of several places:

- Torrisdale, Argyll, in Kintyre, in Scotland
- Torrisdale, Sutherland, in Scotland
- Torresdale, Philadelphia, formerly known as Torrisdale
