= St Kiaran's Episcopal Church, Campbeltown =

St Kiaran’s Episcopal Church, Campbeltown
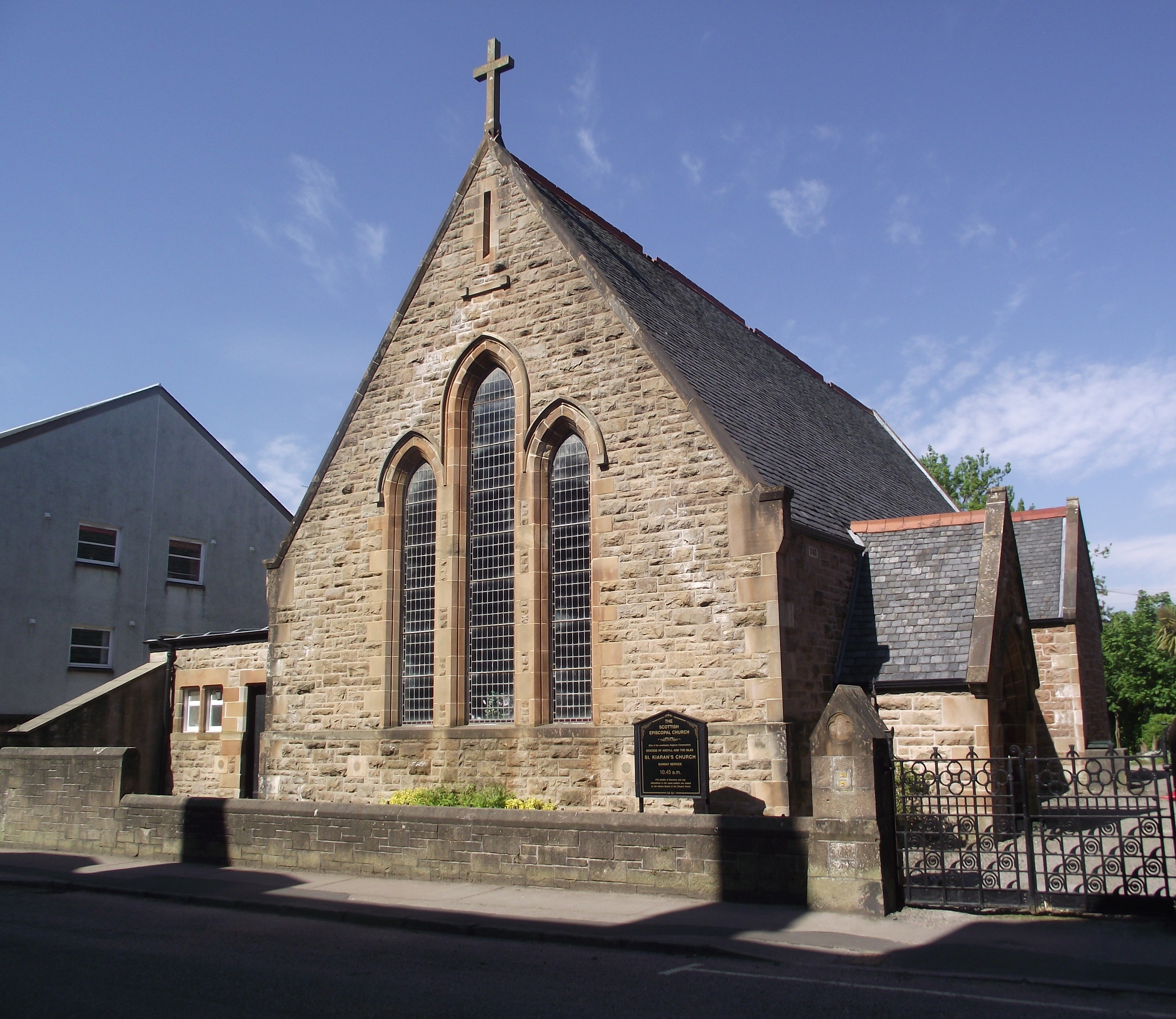
- St Kiaran’s Episcopal Church, Campbeltown
- St Kiaran’s Episcopal Church, Campbeltown
- 55°25′23.2″N 5°36′19″W
- Location: Campbeltown, Argyll and Bute
- Country: Scotland
- Denomination: Scottish Episcopal Church

History
- Status: Parish church
- Dedication: Ciarán of Clonmacnoise
- Consecrated: 8 September 1897

Architecture
- Functional status: Active
- Heritage designation: Category C listed building
- Designated: 28 March 1996
- Architect: Ronald Walker Stirling
- Style: Gothic
- Groundbreaking: 1890
- Completed: 1891
- Construction cost: £3,300 (equivalent to £362,500 in 2025)

Administration
- Diocese: Argyll and the Isles
- Parish: Campbeltown

St Kiaran's Church, Argyll Street is a Category C listed building in Campbeltown, Argyll and Bute.

== History ==
The congregation formed in Campbeltown in 1848 in the Town Hall. They prepared plans for a church of their own, but schemes were not accepted and they bought the United Session Church in Argyll St in 1850.

In 1885 the rectory and gates were erected to the designs of Henry Edward Clifford, but the church was designed by Ronald Walker Stirling and completed in 1891.

The church was consecrated by Alexander Chinnery-Haldane the Bishop of Argyll in 1897.

== Organ ==
The church contains a pipe organ dating from ca. 1860 by J. Brook of Glasgow which was renovated in 1973 by Harrison and Harrison.
