= Lochmaben Town Hall =

Municipal building in Lochmaben, Scotland

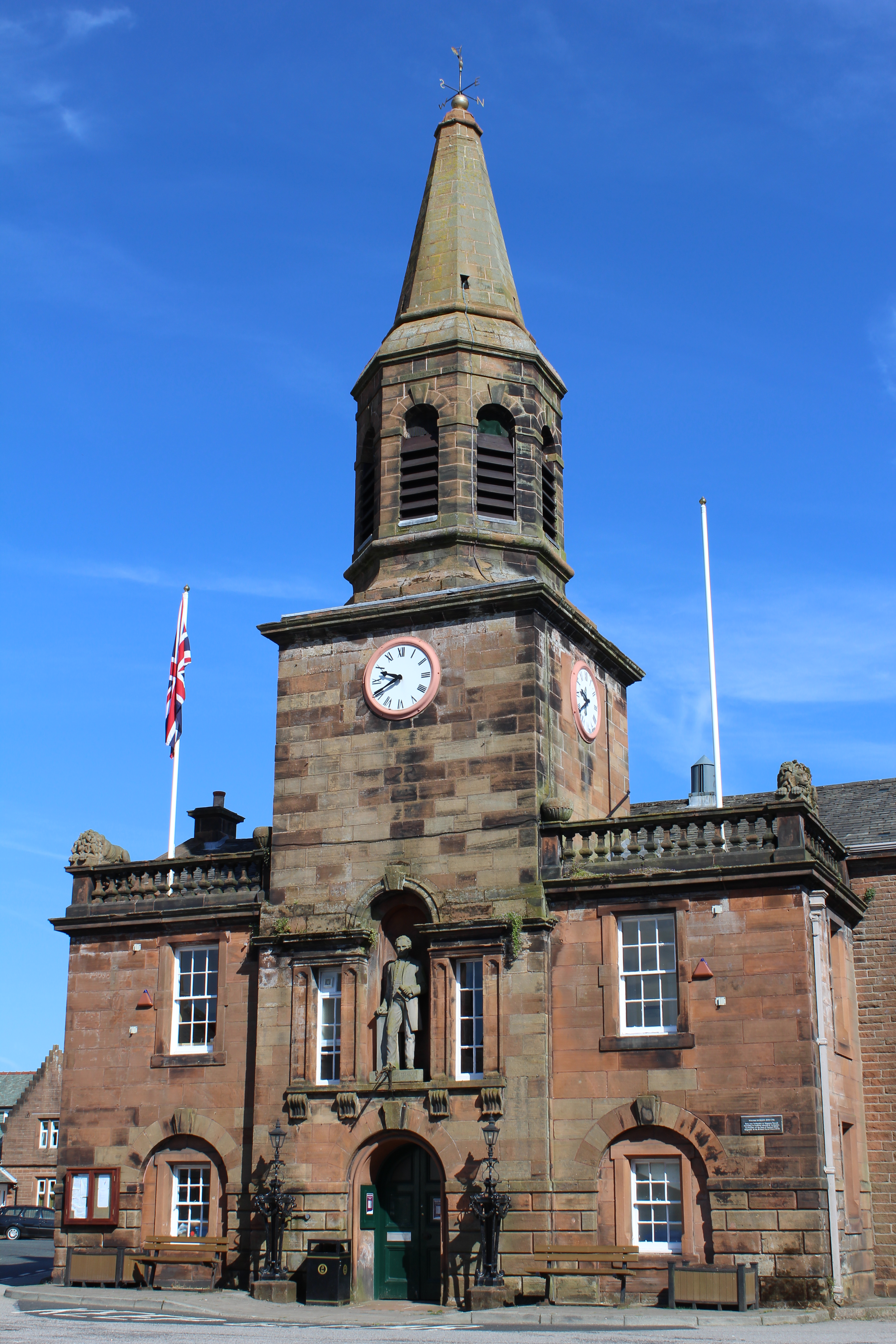
- Lochmaben Town Hall

- Shown in Dumfries and Galloway
- 55.1292°N 3.4417°W
- Location: High Street, Lochmaben

History
- Built: 1723

Site notes
- Architectural style: Scottish baronial style

Listed Building – Category A
- Official name: High Street, Tolbooth including iron lamps
- Designated: 3 August 1971
- Reference no.: LB37541

Lochmaben Town Hall is a municipal building in the High Street in Lochmaben, Dumfries and Galloway, Scotland. The structure, which accommodates a library and a local customer services point, is a Category A listed building.

== History ==
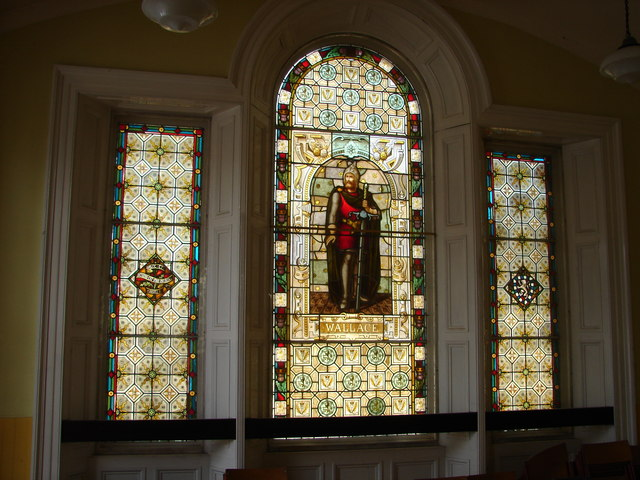
The stained glass window depicting William Wallace in the council chamber

The first municipal building was an early tolbooth which was commissioned on the orders of King James VI and was completed in 1627. It accommodated prison cells on the ground floor and a courtroom on the first floor. Despite some repairs being carried in 1705, it was in a dilapidated state by the early 1720s.

The current building was designed in the Scottish baronial style, built in red sandstone and was completed in 1723. The design involved a symmetrical main frontage with three bays facing south down the High Street; the central bay, which was slightly projected forward, took the form of a three-stage tower with a round headed doorway with voussoirs and a keystone in the first stage, a Venetian window in the section stage and a blind wall in the third stage. The outer bays, which were single storey, featured round headed openings with voussoirs and, at roof level there was a cupola. Internally, the principal rooms was the prison cells on the ground floor and the burgh council chamber on the first floor.

The building was significantly enhanced at the expense of George Vanden-Bempde, 3rd Marquess of Annandale in 1741. The improvements, which were undertaken to a design by John Douglas, included the replacement of the cupola with an octagonal belfry and steeple. A clock, which was designed and manufactured in Edinburgh, was added to the tower in 1862.

Further enhancements were made to a design by David Bryce and his nephew, John Bryce, and undertaken by a local contractor, William Ballantyne, in 1877. These works included replacing the Venetian window with a niche flanked by tall windows with window cills and cornices, heightening the outer bays to two storeys, extending the building to the rear and adding a balustraded parapet at roof level. Stained glass windows depicting William Wallace and Robert the Bruce were installed in the east and west windows of the council chamber respectively at this time.

A statue of Robert the Bruce sculpted by John Hutchison was erected on a pedestal in front of town hall in 1879, and a statue of a local priest, the Reverend William Graham, who had been the main driver behind the improvements designed by Bryce and the statue of Robert the Bruce, was installed in the niche on the front of the building after his death in 1887.

The town hall continued to serve as the meeting place of the burgh council for much of the 20th century but ceased to be the local seat of government when the enlarged Annandale and Eskdale District Council was formed in 1975. An extensive programme of refurbishment works, which involved the installation of a lift, the relocation of the library onto the first floor and the creation of a customer service point, was completed in August 2014. A roll of honour recording the 85 local service personnel who had served in the First World War was restored and mounted in the library in time for the re-opening.

== See also ==
- List of listed buildings in Lochmaben, Dumfries and Galloway
- List of Category A listed buildings in Dumfries and Galloway
