= John Douglas (Scottish architect) =

John Douglas of Pinkerton (c.1709 – 20 June 1778) was a Scottish architect who designed and reformed several country houses in the Scottish Lowlands. His work deserves to be noted for what the 2002 history of Scottish architecture remarks as an approach "of relentless surgery or concealment.". His most notable works are Killin and Ardeonaig Church, Stirlingshire (1744); Archerfield House, East Lothian (1745); Finlaystone House, Renfrewshire (1746–47), Wardhouse (Gordonhall), Insch, Aberdeenshire (1757); and Campbeltown Town Hall, Argyll and Bute (1758–60). Several of these are listed buildings.

== Biography ==
His date and place of birth are not known. In his will, he appears as John Douglas of Pinkerton, late architect in Leith, who died on 20 June 1778. The Edinburgh Recorder (records of the Edinburgh Friendly Fire Insurance Company, which began in 1720 as a loose-knit association of Edinburgh property owners for mutual financial protection against loss by fire), shows that he owned properties in High Street North at Fleshmarket Close East (Thomson’s Close) (records 2754-2757) and at Old Provost Close, East Head (record 2717).

== Work as architect ==
John Douglas designed and renovated several country houses during the middle of the 18th century. He was considered an efficient designer and many of his projects are characterised by a horizontal hierarchy which is signposted by a central projecting body (for example, Archerfield House and Campbeltown Town House).

A cache of his drawings was discovered, curated and exhibited in 1989 by Ian Gow at the Royal Commission on the Ancient and Historical Monuments of Scotland, entitled "John Douglas – William Adam's Rival?". This material has been further analysed, to reveal more about his style in both executed and unexecuted designs (Archerfield House, Galloway House, Finlaystone House, and two designs for Blair Castle). A broader study of his work shows how his designs explored the plastic treatment of the volume and the materiality of elevation in rather eclectic manners beyond his period, often though deemed too fashionable or personal. He is an interesting less-known case of the early 18th century context in Scotland characterised by the professional establishment of architectural practice and a more conscious exploration of personal styles and external influences, often treatises.

Analysis of his major buildings (Archerfield (1745-9), Finlaystone House (1746-7), Wardhouse (1757); student halls in St. Salvator’s (1754–58); the disastrous intervention in Holyrood Abbey church (1760); and the town halls for Lochmaben (1756) and Campbeltown (1760)) show a characteristic treatment of the materiality of elevations and a mannerism that is restrained and more influenced by the earlier Palladianism of Inigo Jones than James Gibbs. More on his professional practice can be revealed from the study of the building contracts for Archerfield and Finlaystone for example, as also the litigation with his journeyman George Paterson, which also confirm disputed authorship of his work

== List of buildings ==
A book by Howard Colvin lists several of his projects, but some of the facts are incorrect (for example, Douglas was indeed responsible for the disastrous repair of the church of Holyrood Abbey in 1760 and the dispute over non-payment of the rest of his fees was resolved only after his death). A map of the buildings on which he worked shows their distribution across Scotland.

- Freeland House, Forgandenny, Perth and Kinross (1733)
- Traquair House (1733–38)
- Quarrell House, Stirlingshire (1735–36). Douglas collaborated with James Gibbs in the reform of the house
- Murthly Castle (1735). Entrance block.
- Ardmaddy Castle (1737). Attributed
- Lochnell House (1737–39)
- Abercairny House, Perth and Kinross (1737–38). Design for improvements
- Galloway House, Garlieston, Dumfries and Galloway (1740). Unexecuted design
- Glasserton House, Dumfries and Galloway (1740–41). Unexecuted design
- Arbroath Harbour (1741). Advised on how to alleviate silting
- Lochmaben Town Hall, Dumfries and Galloway (1743). Design of a steeple
- Taymouth Castle (Balloch Castle), Perth and Kinross (1743–50). Work on the new sash windows, dining room and new entry to the house
- Amulree and Strathbraan Parish Church, Perth and Kinross (1743–52)
- Killin and Ardeonaig Parish Church (1744)
- Kilmahew Castle (1744). Attributed. A ruin
- Archerfield House (1745)
- Fullarton House, South Ayrshire (1745). Attributed
- Finlaystone House, Renfrewshire (1746–47)
- Blair Castle (1748–56). Unexecuted design for remodelling the castle in the Palladian style
- Edmonstone House, (1744–49)
- Dysart, Hot Pot Wynd, Carmelite Monastery (1748). Unexecuted design
- St Salvator’s College (1754–58). University halls of residence (demolished)
- Wardhouse (Gordonhall), Aberdeenshire (1757)
- Holyrood Abbey church, Edinburgh (1758–60). Replacement of roof timber truss with diaphragm walls. Collapsed 2 December 1768
- Campbeltown Town Hall (1758–60)
- Dalhousie Castle, Midlothian (1770s)
- Largo House. Attributed
