= Thomas Melville Lunan =

Scottish architect, born 1878

Thomas Lunan
- Born: Thomas Melville Lunan; 1878; Scotland
- Occupation: Architect
- Awards: FRIBA

Thomas Melville Lunan FRIBA (1878–?) was a Scottish architect, prominent in first half of the 20th century. His design genre mainly included municipal buildings and churches, and he was focussed in the Glasgow area and the west coast of Scotland.

== Career ==
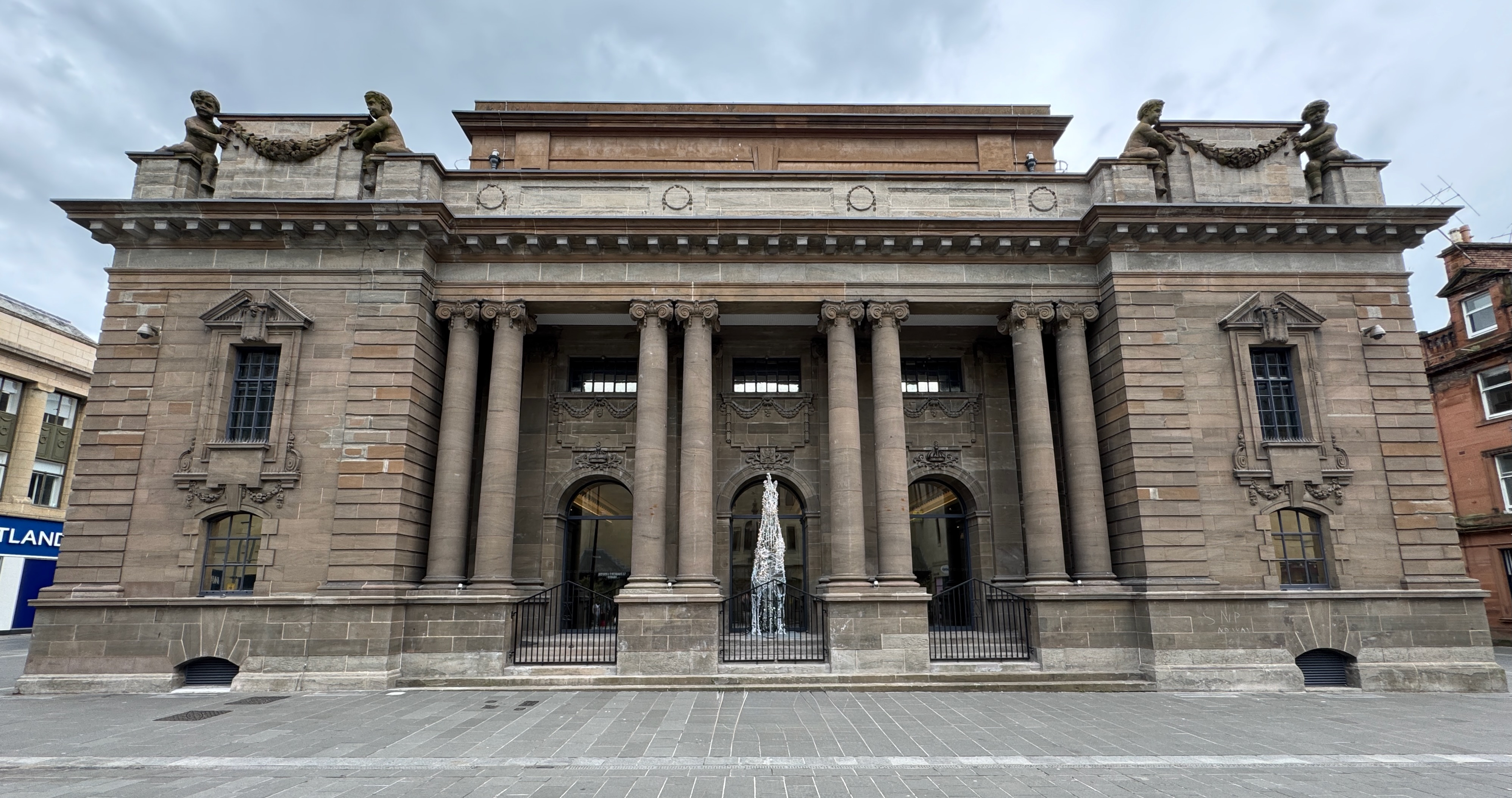
Perth City Hall, Lunan's design with Harry Edward Clifford, pictured in 2024

Lunan began his architectural training in 1895 at the Glasgow School of Art, where he studied under William James Anderson. He apprenticed under James Miller the following year while still at college.

After completing his apprenticeship, in 1901, he joined the firm of Watson & Salmond as senior assistant. They were based at 225 St Vincent Street in Glasgow, adjacent to the offices of Harry Edward Clifford, with whom staff was regularly shared.

Lunan became Clifford's assistant in 1903, then his partner six years later.

He was admitted as a Fellow of the Royal Institute of British Architects in 1911.

In 1914, the duo won the competition for Perth's new City Hall. It was assessed by John Burnet.

Lunan fought in the Great War and returned with post-traumatic stress disorder (PTSD), finding himself unable to work. Clifford bought him out and continued alone.

=== Selected notable works ===
- Perth City Hall (1914)

== Personal life ==
After retiring due to PTSD, Lunan moved to Leeds, where he "married a good wife who restored his morale".
