= Torrisdale Bay, Argyll =

Coastal embayment within Kilbrannan Sound in Scotland

Coordinates: 55.566996°N 5.492806°W

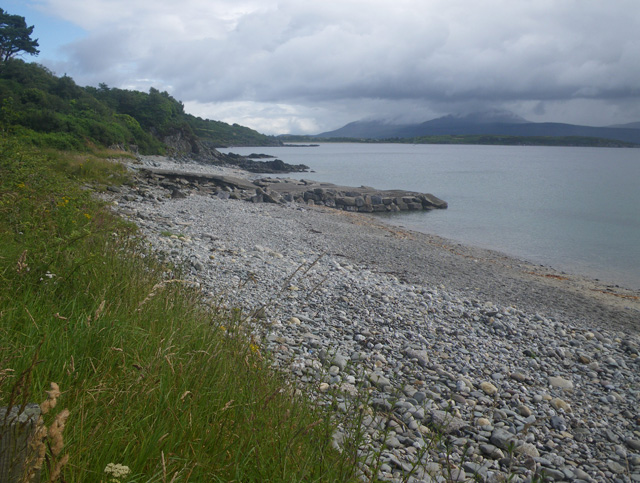
Torrisdale Bay

Torrisdale Bay is a coastal embayment along the east side of the Kintyre Peninsula within Kilbrannan Sound in Scotland. The shoreline of the bay consists partially of a shingle beach. Nearby is located Torrisdale Castle. The villages of Torrisdale and Bridgend lie along Torrisdale Bay with Carradale directly to the north. Bottlenose dolphins and harbor porpoises are often sighted.

== See also ==
- Dippen Bay
