= List of listed buildings in Glasgow/10 =

This is a list of listed buildings in Glasgow, Scotland.

== List ==
Name	Location	Date listed	Grid ref. (Note: Sometimes known as OSGB36, the grid reference (where provided) is based on the British national grid reference system used by the Ordnance Survey. • "Guide to National Grid". Ordnance Survey. • "Get-a-map". Ordnance Survey.)	Geo-coordinates	Notes	LB number (Note: Historic Environment Scotland assign a unique alphanumeric identifier to each designated site in Scotland, for listed buildings this always begins with "LB", for example "LB12345".)	Image
1012 Great Western Road, Boundary Walls And Gatepiers				55°53′03″N 4°18′26″W	Category B	32336	Upload Photo
Victoria Park Drive North, North Gatepiers To Victoria Park And Gates				55°52′40″N 4°19′57″W	Category B	32341	Upload another image
7, 11, 13, 21, 29 And 35 Winton Lane				55°53′10″N 4°17′54″W	Category B	32345	Upload Photo
Gairbraid Avenue, Former Fire Station				55°53′26″N 4°17′29″W	Category C(S)	32351	Upload Photo
70 Earlbank Avenue, Scotstoun East Church And Halls				55°52′46″N 4°20′48″W	Category C(S)	32277	Upload Photo
140-142 Medwyn Street, Whiteinch Baths				55°52′29″N 4°20′08″W	Category B	32278	Upload Photo
78 - 104 (Even Nos) Park Road And 9 South Woodside Road				55°52′22″N 4°16′47″W	Category C(S)	32244	Upload Photo
Park Terrace Balustrade Railings And Gateway To Kelvingrove Park				55°52′12″N 4°16′52″W	Category A	32246	Upload another image
2, 12, 18, 24, 30 Willowbank Street And 176, 178, 180, 182, 184, 188 Woodlands Road				55°52′14″N 4°16′32″W	Category B	32261	Upload Photo
52-68 (Even Nos) Woodlands Road And 4 Baliol Street				55°52′07″N 4°16′22″W	Category B	32265	Upload Photo
11A, 15, 17 Lynedoch Street				55°52′06″N 4°16′27″W	Category B	32225	Upload Photo
Park Gardens, Stairway To Park Street South				55°52′05″N 4°16′49″W	Category A	32241	Upload another image
Colebrooke Street/Great Western Road Glasgow Academy War Memorial And School Boundary Wall				55°52′31″N 4°16′50″W	Category B	32187	Upload Photo
Eldon Street/Park Road St Silas English Church (Episcopal Church)				55°52′20″N 4°16′48″W	Category B	32189	Upload Photo
2, 4 And 10 Great George Street And 63 Bank Street				55°52′25″N 4°17′01″W	Category B	32196	Upload Photo
380 Bearsden Road, Canal Restaurant (Former Robinson Dunn Offices)				55°53′42″N 4°19′19″W	Category C(S)	32170	Upload Photo
31, 33, 35 Lynedoch Street And 92, 96 Woodside Terrace Lane, Former Trinity College				55°52′05″N 4°16′34″W	Category A	32171	Upload another image
60 North Hanover Street And 63 North Frederick Street, Glasgow College Of Building And Printing				55°51′45″N 4°14′57″W	Category B	48414	Upload another image
Clyde Street, Statue Of Dolores Ibarruri, La Pasionaria				55°51′23″N 4°15′30″W	Category B	49920	Upload another image
79 Springkell Avenue, `Whitehall' Including Gatepiers And Boundary Walls				55°50′17″N 4°17′33″W	Category B	49928	Upload Photo
12-20 (Even Nos) Coburg Street				55°51′11″N 4°15′28″W	Category C(S)	50012	Upload Photo
74 Victoria Crescent Road, Former Notre Dame Training College Chapel And Practising School Including Boundary Walls				55°52′38″N 4°18′00″W	Category C(S)	50028	Upload Photo
30 Maitland Street, Scottish Ambulance Service And 54 Milton Street, St Andrew's House, St Andrew's Ambulance Association				55°52′04″N 4°15′24″W	Category A	50073	Upload another image See more images
35 Dowanhill Street, Dowanvale Free Church Of Scotland				55°52′19″N 4°18′03″W	Category C(S)	50182	Upload another image
58 Bridge Street And 2 And 4 Nelson Street, The Laurieston Bar				55°51′11″N 4°15′33″W	Category C(S)	51537	Upload Photo
Victoria Park, Clock				55°52′31″N 4°19′51″W	Category C(S)	51738	Upload Photo
Glencairn Drive, Titwood Tennis Clubhouse				55°50′18″N 4°17′01″W	Category C(S)	44656	Upload Photo
372 Albert Drive, Knowehead With Gatepiers, Gates And Boundary Walls				55°50′34″N 4°17′41″W	Category B	44113	Upload Photo
129 Holehouse Drive, Blawarthill Hospital Reception/ Administration Block, Gates, Gatepiers And Boundary Walls				55°53′23″N 4°22′04″W	Category C(S)	43475	Upload Photo
11 Newlands Road, Dunstaffnage Including Perimeter Walls And Gatepiers				55°49′16″N 4°17′04″W	Category B	33945	Upload Photo
181 Shawbridge Street, Pollokshaws Uf Church				55°49′21″N 4°17′56″W	Category B	33963	Upload Photo
73 Craigpark, Our Lady Of Good Counsel Roman Catholic Church				55°51′45″N 4°13′21″W	Category A	33891	Upload another image
247-249 (Odd Nos) Duke Street, Former Duke Street Hospital				55°51′31″N 4°13′33″W	Category B	33896	Upload Photo
285-295 (Odd Nos) Duke Street And 3, 5, 7 Westercraigs				55°51′31″N 4°13′28″W	Category B	33897	Upload Photo
176 Duke Street, Kirkhaven				55°51′32″N 4°13′48″W	Category A	33899	Upload Photo
202-210 (Even Nos) Hunter Street				55°51′32″N 4°13′55″W	Category B	33901	Upload Photo
129 Roslea Drive, Meadowpark Street And Finlay Drive, Dennistoun Public School, St Dennis Rc Primary School				55°51′34″N 4°12′50″W	Category B	33904	Upload Photo
130-132 Springburn Road, Office To St Rollox Railway Works (Block Fronting Street)				55°52′25″N 4°13′58″W	Category B	33906	Upload Photo
31 Westercraigs				55°51′38″N 4°13′27″W	Category C(S)	33909	Upload Photo
47 Greenhead Street, 22 And 24 Macphail Street, Buchanan House (Formerly Greenhead School), Including Gatepiers And Railings				55°50′53″N 4°13′54″W	Category B	33845	Upload Photo
89 James Street				55°50′54″N 4°13′45″W	Category B	33849	Upload Photo
35 Tureen Street, Tureen Street School, Three Main Blocks Including Janitor's Lodge				55°51′17″N 4°13′49″W	Category B	33860	Upload Photo
17 Watson Street				55°51′25″N 4°14′33″W	Category A	33862	Upload Photo
1127 Cathcart Road And Carmunnock Road, Mount Florida Primary School Including Playground Walls, Gatepiers And Railings				55°49′28″N 4°15′27″W	Category B	33801	Upload another image
29-35 (Odd Nos) East Campbell Street, Lodging House Mission Including Hall, Vestry				55°51′23″N 4°14′14″W	Category B	33829	Upload Photo
Glasgow Green, Doulton Fountain In Front Of People's Palace				55°51′06″N 4°14′10″W	Category A	33836	Upload another image See more images
62 Belmont Street, 93 And 99 Garriochmill Road, Kelvin Stevenson Memorial Church (Church Of Scotland) And Caretaker's House				55°52′38″N 4°16′44″W	Category A	33753	Upload another image
36-42 (Even Nos) Clouston Street And 1-7 (Odd Nos) Sanda Street With Railings				55°52′53″N 4°17′13″W	Category B	33758	Upload Photo
115 Kelvin Drive, Lismore House, With Gates, Gatepiers And Retaining Walls				55°52′52″N 4°17′25″W	Category B	33770	Upload Photo
343-7 (Odd Nos) St George's Road, Woodside Library				55°52′20″N 4°16′02″W	Category B	33780	Upload another image
Croftfoot Road, Mill Street, Gatepiers, Formerly To Castlemilk House				55°48′53″N 4°12′53″W	Category C(S)	33715	Upload Photo
Delvin Road Bridge, Over River Cart				55°49′03″N 4°15′34″W	Category B	33716	Upload Photo
118, 120 Carmunnock Road, Kilmailing Road, Old Cathcart Parish Church (Fragments), Churchyard Including Boundary Walls				55°49′05″N 4°15′23″W	Category B	33719	Upload Photo
Old Castle Road, Railway Bridge Over River Cart And Old Castle Road				55°49′04″N 4°15′35″W	Category B	33723	Upload Photo
Old Castle Road, Cathcart Castle				55°48′47″N 4°15′23″W	Category C(S)	33724	Upload Photo
2317 Maryhill Road, Gates, Gatepiers Quadrant Walls And Railings To West Of Scotland Science Park (Formerly To Garscube Estate)				55°54′13″N 4°18′42″W	Category C(S)	33730	Upload Photo
Balmore Road, Lambhill Bridge				55°53′49″N 4°15′57″W	Category C(S)	33740	Upload Photo
591 Tollcross Road, Tollcross House Lodge, Tollcross Park				55°50′46″N 4°11′02″W	Category B	33649	Upload Photo
Hamilton Road, Daldowie Dovecot				55°50′27″N 4°07′45″W	Category A	33668	Upload another image
Ballater Street, King's Bridge				55°50′48″N 4°14′15″W	Category C(S)	33680	Upload Photo
99 Calder Street, Kingarth Lane, Calder Street Public Baths And Wash House				55°50′18″N 4°15′47″W	Category B	33683	Upload another image See more images
311 (Odd Nos) Calder Street, Council Social Work Department, Formerly Holy Cross Infants Rc School, Formerly Batson Street School				55°50′12″N 4°15′21″W	Category B	33684	Upload another image See more images
183 Meiklerig Crescent And Templeland Road St James' Pollok Church Of Scotland Including Hall And Gatepiers				55°50′04″N 4°20′55″W	Category B	33601	Upload Photo
179 Braidfauld Street, St Margaret's Tollcross Church Including Boundary Walls Gates And Railings				55°50′30″N 4°10′39″W	Category B	33627	Upload another image
41 Broad Street (Engineering Works)				55°51′03″N 4°13′25″W	Category B	33628	Upload Photo
330-346 (Even Nos) Paisley Road, Former Kingston Public Halls, Library And Police Office				55°51′15″N 4°16′28″W	Category B	33524	Upload another image
1 & 3 Paisley Road West And 2 & 4 Admiral Street Including Old Toll Bar Public House				55°51′13″N 4°16′45″W	Category B	33525	Upload Photo
25 And 27 Paisley Road West And 1, 7, 9 And 11 Stanley Street				55°51′12″N 4°16′47″W	Category B	33541	Upload Photo
11 Eldon Street, Park Drive, Park Avenue, St Andrew's Teachers Training College, Former Queen's College, With Railings				55°52′17″N 4°16′45″W	Category B	33548	Upload Photo
18 Carillon Road, 67 Clifford Street, Ibrox Parish Church				55°50′59″N 4°18′05″W	Category B	33575	Upload another image
598-612 (Even Nos) And 612A Shields Road, Including Boundary Walls And Gatepiers				55°50′27″N 4°16′39″W	Category B	33481	Upload Photo
37, 39, 45 Bridge Street				55°51′12″N 4°15′29″W	Category C(S)	33493	Upload Photo
63, 65, 67 Bridge Street				55°51′11″N 4°15′30″W	Category B	33494	Upload Photo
71 Oxford Street, 78 Nicholson Street And 3, 15 Oxford Street				55°51′11″N 4°15′19″W	Category B	33522	Upload Photo
67 Glencairn Drive, Fragment Of Pollokshields - Glencairn Church, Including Boundary Walls				55°50′18″N 4°16′43″W	Category C(S)	33408	Upload Photo
70 And 72 Glencairn Drive, Pollokshields Burgh Hall, Including Lodge And Gateway To Maxwell Park				55°50′19″N 4°17′15″W	Category A	33411	Upload another image
10 Leslie Road, Including Boundary Walls And Gatepiers				55°50′29″N 4°16′47″W	Category C(S)	33418	Upload another image See more images
41 Newark Drive, Newark Lodge (Original Part), Including Boundary Walls				55°50′25″N 4°17′04″W	Category B	33433	Upload Photo
14 Newark Drive, Including Boundary Walls And Gatepiers				55°50′23″N 4°16′44″W	Category B	33435	Upload Photo
Carmunnock, 80 Busby Road Carnbooth House, Lodge And Gatepiers				55°47′12″N 4°14′42″W	Category C(S), destroyed by fire 2023	33317	Upload Photo
881, 883, 885, 887 Govan Road, 2, 4 Shaw St				55°51′50″N 4°18′59″W	Category B	33346	Upload Photo
Govan Road, Auxiliary Accumulator Tower, West End Of Princes Dock				55°51′22″N 4°17′58″W	Category C(S)	33347	Upload Photo
1 Pacific Quay And Return Elevation To Govan Road, Former Prince's Dock Hydraulic Power Station				55°51′25″N 4°17′15″W	Category A	33360	Upload Photo
199-221 (Odd Nos) Albert Drive, Tower Buildings				55°50′31″N 4°16′24″W	Category B	33369	Upload Photo
332 Albert Drive, Including Boundary Walls And Gatepiers				55°50′40″N 4°17′08″W	Category B	33381	Upload Photo
10 Bruce Road Castramont, Including Boundary Walls And Gatepiers				55°50′40″N 4°16′43″W	Category B	33391	Upload Photo
68 West George Street, 12 Nelson Mandela Place, Royal Faculty of Procurators				55°51′44″N 4°15′17″W	Category A	33235	Upload another image
134, 134A, 136 West George Street				55°51′45″N 4°15′24″W	Category B	33239	Upload Photo
81, 83 West Regent Street				55°51′47″N 4°15′30″W	Category C(S)	33259	Upload Photo
111, 113 West Regent Street, 121-127 (Odd Nos) Wellington Street And 86 West Regent Lane				55°51′48″N 4°15′35″W	Category B	33266	Upload Photo
19-23 (Odd Nos) West Nile Street And 2-6 (Even Nos) Drury Street				55°51′40″N 4°15′20″W	Category B	33286	Upload Photo
133 Balornock Road, Stobhill Hospital				55°53′36″N 4°13′05″W	Category B	33290	Upload Photo
Elder Park, Statue Of Mrs John Elder				55°51′41″N 4°19′32″W	Category A	33304	Upload another image
1345 Govan Road, Southern General Hospital, Administration Block				55°51′43″N 4°20′16″W	Category B	33306	Upload Photo
612 Old Renfrew Road Shiels House				55°52′17″N 4°21′20″W	Category B	33311	Upload Photo
1055-1065 (Odd Nos) Sauchiehall Street, 23 Radnor Street				55°52′01″N 4°17′22″W	Category C(S)	33186	Upload Photo
3-7 (Odd Nos) Scott Street				55°51′57″N 4°15′54″W	Category B	33200	Upload Photo
75-95 (Odd Nos) Union Street, Caledonian Chambers				55°51′35″N 4°15′26″W	Category B	33204	Upload another image
30-46 (Even Nos) Washington Street				55°51′30″N 4°16′09″W	Category C(S)	33211	Upload Photo
261 St Vincent Street, St Vincent Street Church (Originally Up, Former United Free Church Of Scotland, Now Free Church)				55°51′44″N 4°15′56″W	Category A	33150	Upload another image
78 St Vincent Street				55°51′41″N 4°15′20″W	Category B	33151	Upload Photo
250 St Vincent Street				55°51′45″N 4°15′50″W	Category B	33166	Upload another image
217 Sauchiehall Street, And 114, 116 Sauchiehall Lane, Formerly Willow Tea Rooms				55°51′54″N 4°15′40″W	Category A	33173	Upload another image
King George V Bridge Over River Clyde, From Oswald Street To Commerce Street				55°51′23″N 4°15′35″W	Category B	33081	Upload another image
52 Lumsden Street And Overnewton Street, Overnewton Centre, Former Overnewton School				55°51′58″N 4°17′34″W	Category B	33084	Upload Photo
26, 32 Minerva Street				55°51′48″N 4°16′57″W	Category B	33086	Upload Photo
13, 15 And 17 Renfield Street				55°51′40″N 4°15′26″W	Category B	33101	Upload Photo
28-36 (Even Nos) Renfield Street				55°51′43″N 4°15′22″W	Category B	33104	Upload Photo
256-262 (Even Nos) Renfrew Street				55°52′01″N 4°16′05″W	Category B	33110	Upload Photo
22, 24 St Enoch Square				55°51′28″N 4°15′21″W	Category B	33123	Upload another image
38-44 (Even Nos) St Enoch Square				55°51′26″N 4°15′21″W	Category B	33125	Upload Photo
42-50 (Even Nos) Gordon Street				55°51′39″N 4°15′23″W	Category B	33032	Upload Photo
86-94 (Even Nos) Hill Street				55°52′02″N 4°15′54″W	Category B	33043	Upload another image
122 Hill Street				55°52′03″N 4°16′01″W	Category B	33046	Upload Photo
43, 45, 47 Hope Street And 1A Cadogan Street, 'Atlantic Chambers'				55°51′35″N 4°15′34″W	Category A	33050	Upload another image
106, 108, 110 Hope Street (Known As 108)				55°51′40″N 4°15′30″W	Category A	33056	Upload another image
65-73 (Odd Nos) James Watt Street (Known As 69 James Watt Street), Atlantic Apartments				55°51′30″N 4°15′51″W	Category A	33068	Upload Photo
21-31 (Odd Nos) (Known As 21) Buchanan Street And 8-28 (Even Nos) Mitchell Street				55°51′31″N 4°15′20″W	Category A	32991	Upload another image
63-69 (Odd Nos) Buchanan Street, Former Glasgow Herald Building				55°51′34″N 4°15′18″W	Category B	32994	Upload Photo
235-245 (Odd Nos) Buchanan Street, The George Hotel				55°51′50″N 4°15′12″W	Category B	33005	Upload Photo
2-6 (Even Nos) Corunna Street And 1147-1153 (Odd Nos) Argyle Street				55°51′53″N 4°17′07″W	Category B	33014	Upload Photo
1G Gilmorehill, University Of Glasgow, Engineering Building				55°52′17″N 4°17′11″W	Category B	32919	Upload Photo
1K Gilmorehill, University of Glasgow, Pearce Lodge, Comprising Gateway, Janitor's House and Classrooms				55°52′19″N 4°17′09″W	Category A	32925	Upload another image
1 University Gardens, Hillhead				55°52′22″N 4°17′21″W	Category B	32929	Upload another image
44-46 (Even Nos) Ashton Lane				55°52′28″N 4°17′36″W	Category B	32937	Upload Photo
127, 129 Bath Street				55°51′51″N 4°15′36″W	Category B	32958	Upload Photo
207 Bath Street				55°51′52″N 4°15′51″W	Category B	32962	Upload Photo
20 Lawrence Street, Partick East Church Of Scotland And Halls				55°52′24″N 4°17′56″W	Category B	32884	Upload Photo
1 And 1C Gilmorehill, University Of Glasgow, West Range And Memorial Chapel				55°52′18″N 4°17′23″W	Category A	32914	Upload Photo
53 Hillhead Street, Florentine House				55°52′25″N 4°17′16″W	Category B	32878	Upload Photo
69-71 (Odd Nos) Queen Street				55°51′34″N 4°15′09″W	Category B	32816	Upload Photo
170-180 (Even Nos) Howard Street With 37 Ropework Lane, Former Stockwell Free Church				55°51′20″N 4°15′04″W	Category B	32729	Upload another image See more images
19 John Street And 45-49 (Odd Nos) Cochrane Street				55°51′37″N 4°14′54″W	Category B	32751	Upload Photo
4-8 (Even Nos) John Street				55°51′36″N 4°14′51″W	Category B	32752	Upload Photo
30-34 Mcphater Street And 3 And 5 Larbert Street, The Piping Centre, Cowcaddens Former Free Church And Hall				55°52′02″N 4°15′24″W	Category B	32755	Upload another image
42 Miller Street				55°51′31″N 4°15′03″W	Category A	32760	Upload Photo
151-153 (Odd Nos) Trongate				55°51′26″N 4°14′53″W	Category B	32776	Upload Photo
190 Trongate And 2-4 (Even Nos) Glassford Street				55°51′27″N 4°14′56″W	Category A	32789	Upload another image
20 Turnbull Street, 21 Steel Street, Tent Hall				55°51′17″N 4°14′41″W	Category B	32791	Upload Photo
42 Virginia Street				55°51′31″N 4°14′59″W	Category A	32798	Upload another image
24-28 (Even Nos) Walls Street				55°51′30″N 4°14′36″W	Category B	32799	Upload Photo
29 College Street, Telephone Exchange				55°51′34″N 4°14′31″W	Category B	32676	Upload Photo
George Square, Thomas Campbell Statue				55°51′40″N 4°15′00″W	Category B	32693	Upload another image
George Square, Lamp Standards				55°51′40″N 4°15′00″W	Category B	32700	Upload another image
George Square, Robert Burns Statue				55°51′40″N 4°15′02″W	Category B	32703	Upload another image
68-74 (Even Nos) Glassford Street				55°51′33″N 4°14′55″W	Category C(S)	32715	Upload Photo
64 Buchanan Street				55°51′35″N 4°15′14″W	Category B	32636	Upload Photo
66-72 (Even Nos) Buchanan Street, Rowan House				55°51′35″N 4°15′14″W	Category B	32637	Upload Photo
164A-168 (Even Nos) Buchanan Street With 10 Dundas Lane, Brittania Buildings				55°51′45″N 4°15′11″W	Category A	32643	Upload another image
39-69 (Odd Nos) Candleriggs And 5-15 (Odd Nos) Wilson Street				55°51′30″N 4°14′45″W	Category B	32644	Upload Photo

== Key ==
The scheme for classifying buildings in Scotland is:

- Category A: "buildings of national or international importance, either architectural or historic; or fine, little-altered examples of some particular period, style or building type."
- Category B: "buildings of regional or more than local importance; or major examples of some particular period, style or building type, which may have been altered."
- Category C: "buildings of local importance; lesser examples of any period, style, or building type, as originally constructed or moderately altered; and simple traditional buildings which group well with other listed buildings."

In March 2016 there were 47,288 listed buildings in Scotland. Of these, 8% were Category A, and 50% were Category B, with the remaining 42% being Category C.

== See also ==
- List of listed buildings in Glasgow
