= Pollokshields Burgh Hall =

Municipal building in Pollokshields, Scotland

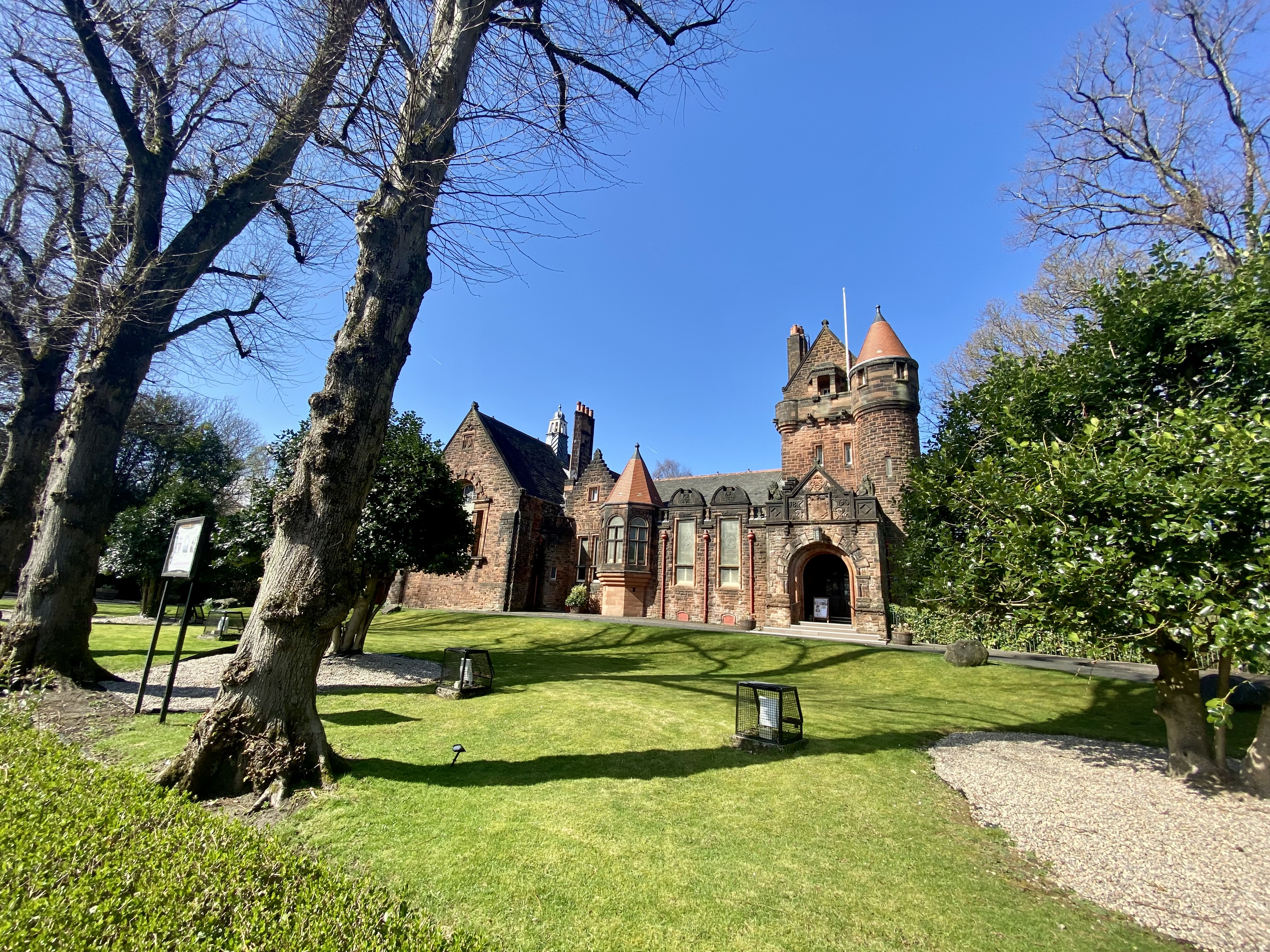
- Pollokshields Burgh Hall

- Shown in Glasgow
- 55.83891°N 4.28706°W
- Location: Glasgow

History
- Built: 1890

Site notes
- Architect: Harry Edward Clifford
- Architectural style: Scottish Baronial style
- Website: www.pollokshieldsburghhall.com

Listed Building – Category A
- Designated: 15 December 1970
- Reference no.: LB33411

The Pollokshields Burgh Hall is a municipal building at the edge of Maxwell Park, Glasgow, Scotland. The burgh hall, which was briefly the headquarters of Pollokshields Burgh Council, is a Category A listed building.

== History ==
The building was commissioned and endowed for future maintenance by the politician, Sir John Stirling Maxwell of Pollok House, as a gift for the people of Pollokshields. The site he selected in Glencairn Drive had formed part of the Old Pollok Estate, which had been home to the Maxwell family for over 700 years.

The burgh hall was designed by Harry Edward Clifford in the Scottish Baronial style and built with dark red sandstone from the Ballochmyle Estate in Ayrshire. A ceremony was held at which Maxwell laid a memorial stone to commemorate the opening of the burgh hall and also the opening of Maxwell Park, which he had also gifted to the local people, on 25 October 1890. The design involved an asymmetrical main frontage facing Glencairn Drive; the main hall, which projected forward was on the left; the right bay featured a gabled porch with a round-headed doorway on the ground floor and a tower above; there is a bartizan on the left-hand corner of the tower, seen on the photos above and below.

The building was initially used as a masonic meeting place by masonic lodge no. 772 and was also briefly used as the headquarters of the independent burgh of Pollokshields until 1891, when the burgh was absorbed into the city of Glasgow. It was extended in 1935.

After functioning as a day centre for Glasgow Corporation and then, from 1975, for Strathclyde Regional Council, it was deemed surplus to requirements in 1982 and was acquired by the Pollokshields Burgh Hall Trust for a nominal sum in 1986. Following refurbishment by the trust it reopened for community use in 1997. The lower ground floor was refurbished and converted for conference use with financial support from the National Heritage Memorial Fund in the late 1990s. The actress, Keira Knightley, attended her brother's wedding at the hall in April 2011.

== Architecture ==
The dominant external feature of the building is the 60-foot (18 m) high tower, while the entrance porch exhibits the Maxwell family coat of arms flanked by two Scottish lions.

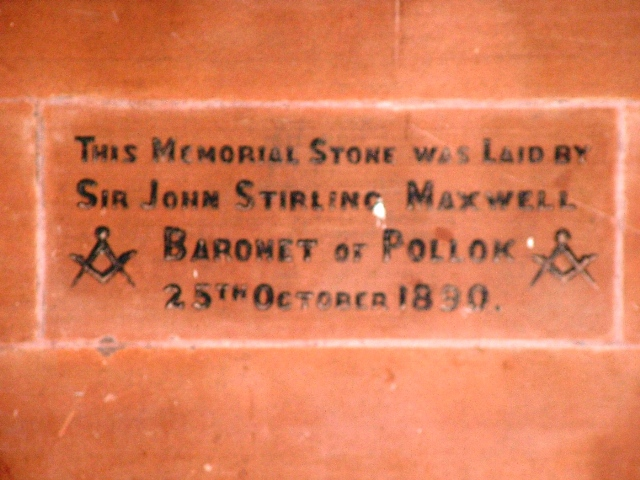
Foundation Stone

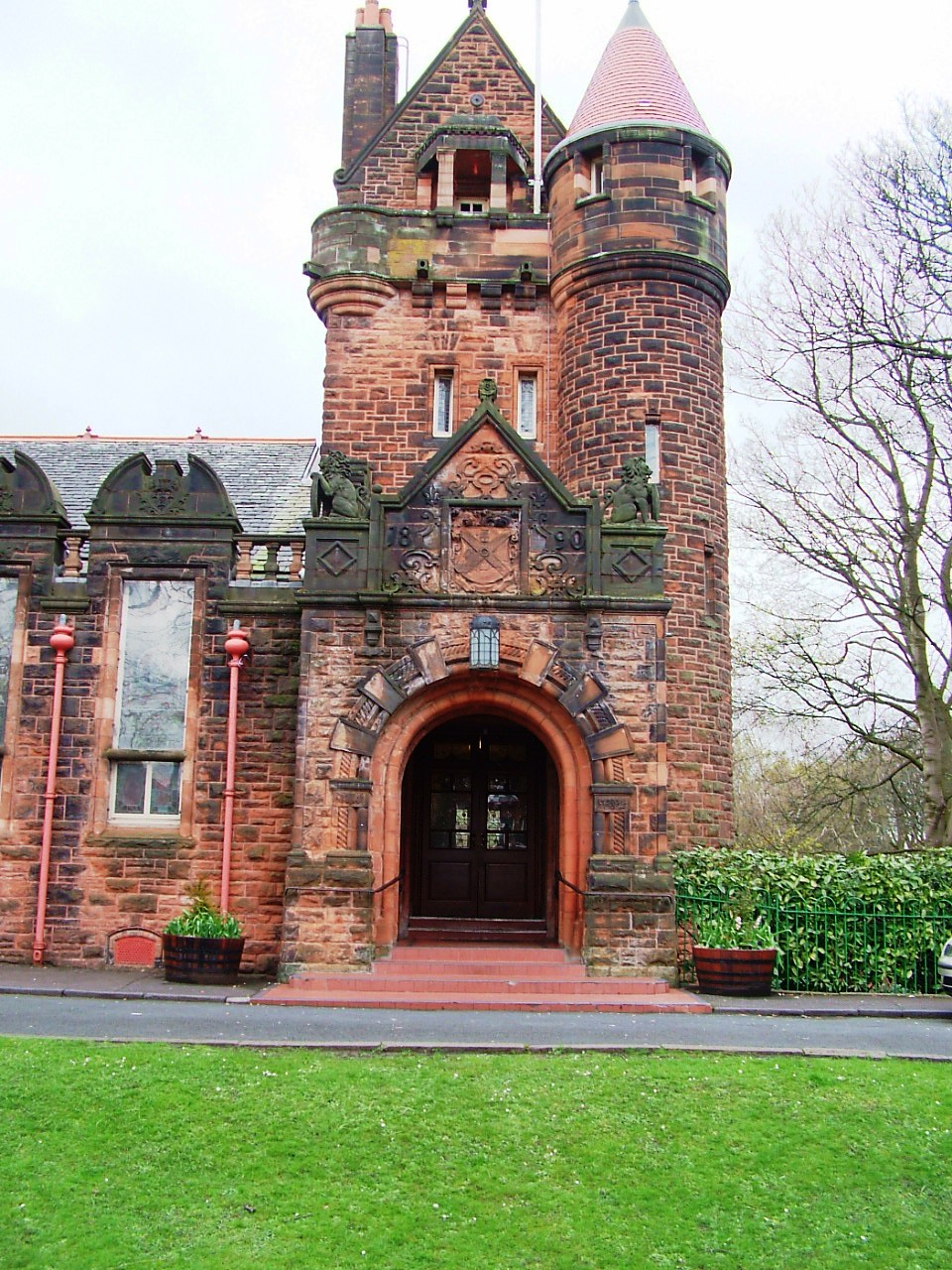
The Tower with bartizan at top left

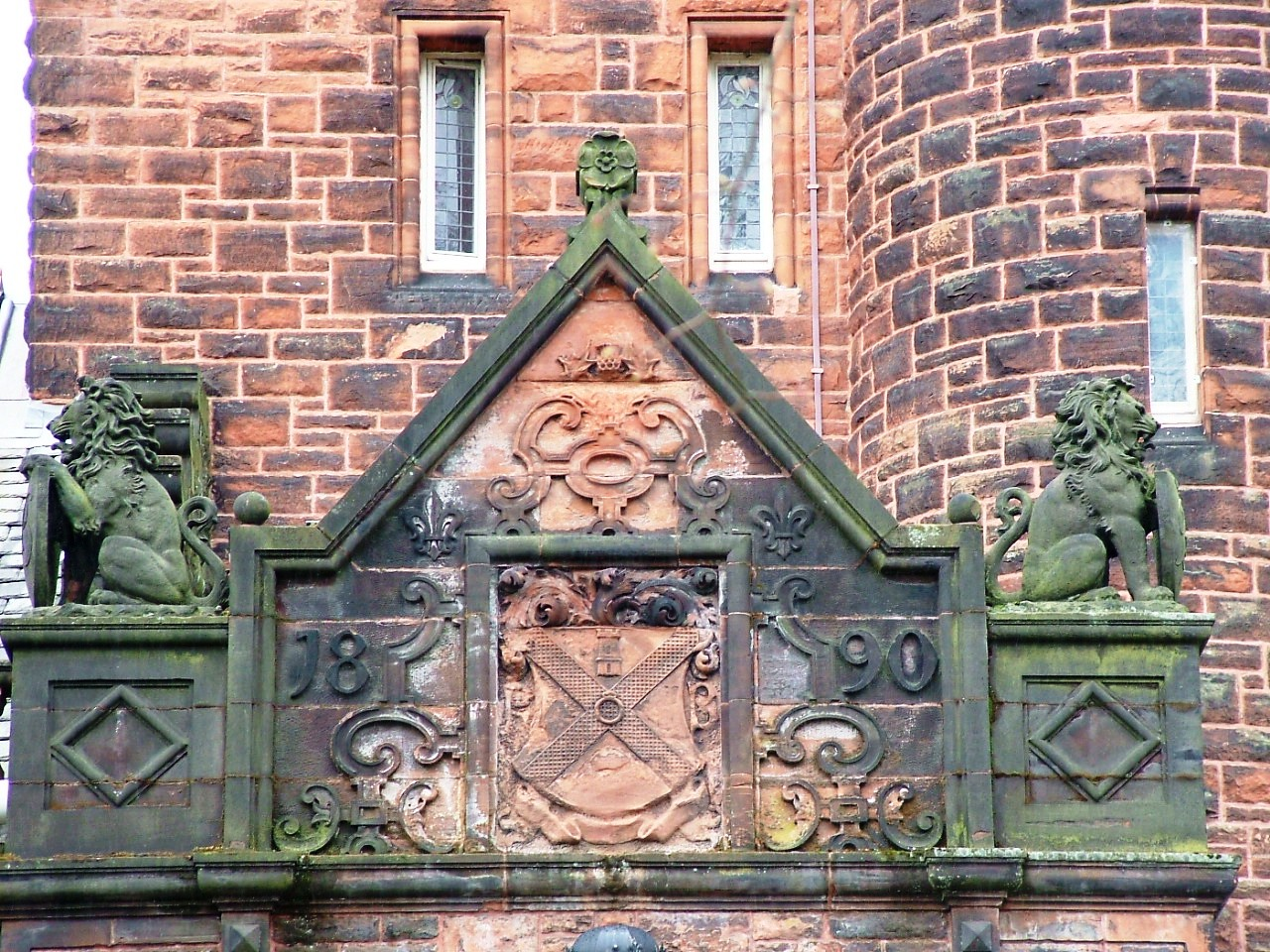
Maxwell Coat of Arms

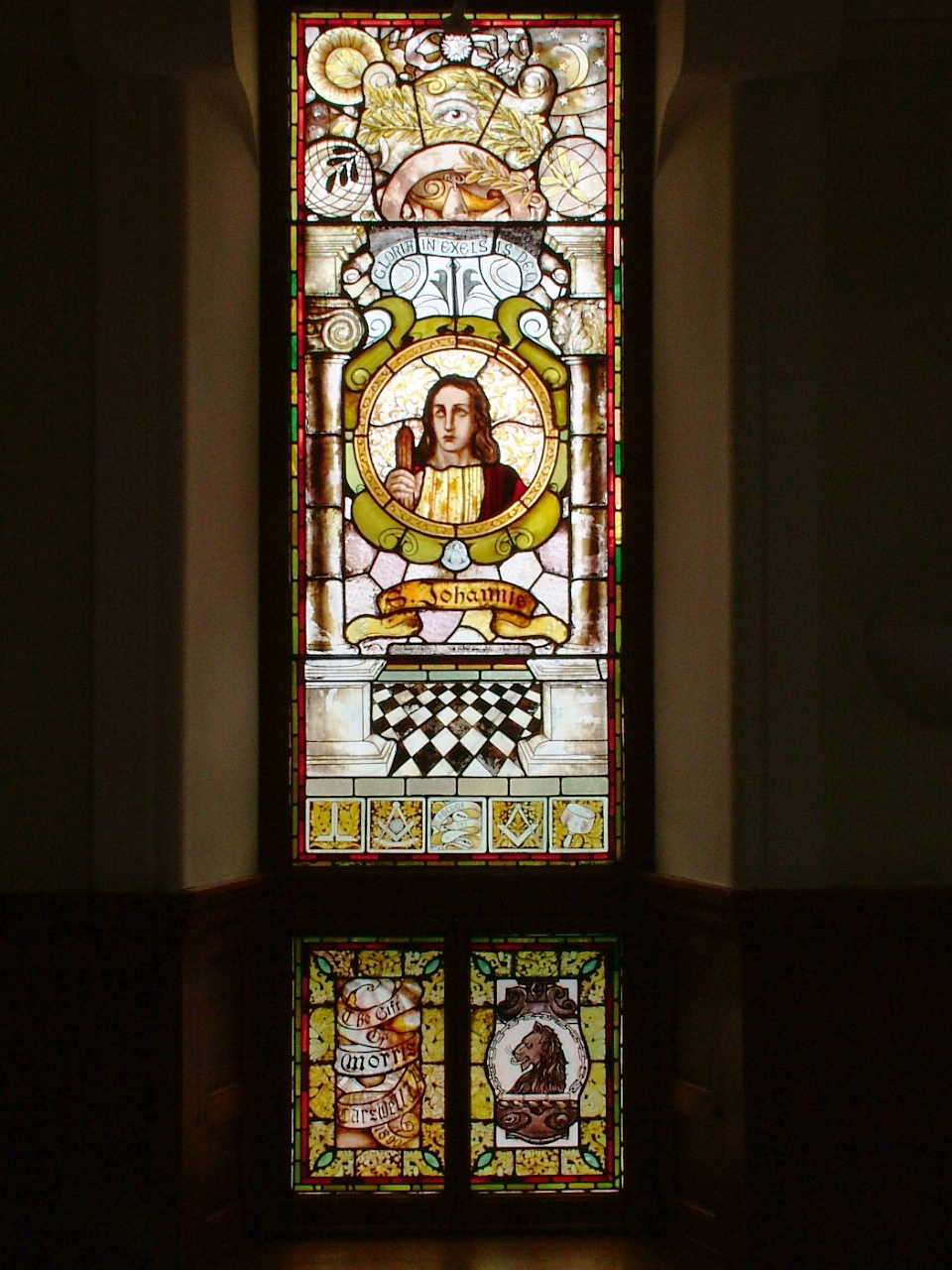
Stained Glass Window donated by Lodge Pollok's 1st Master Morris Carswell

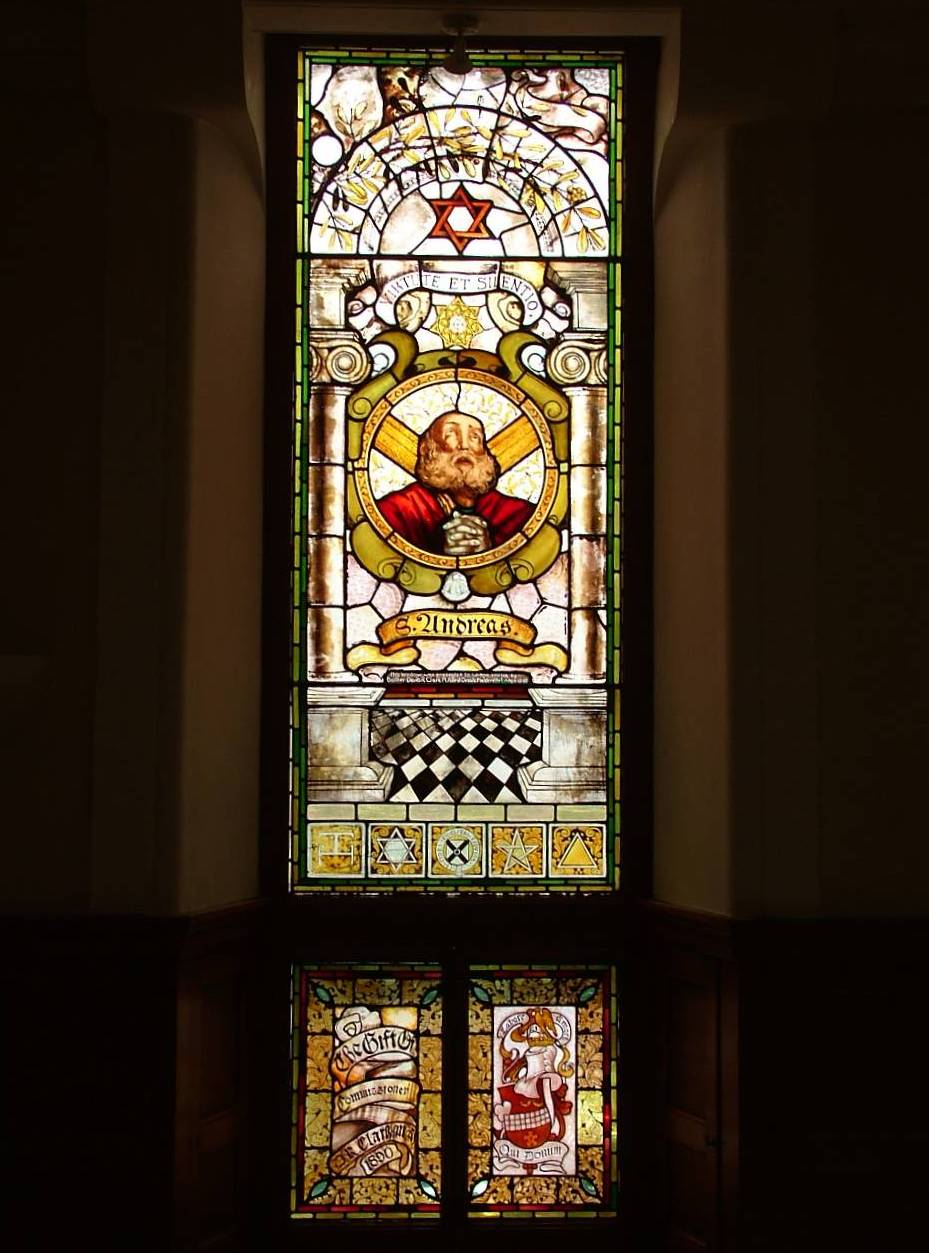
Stained Glass Window donated by Lodge Pollok's 2nd Master David R Clark

== See also ==
- List of Category A listed buildings in Glasgow
- List of listed buildings in Glasgow/10
