= Christian Institute, Campbeltown =

The Christian Institute, Campbeltown
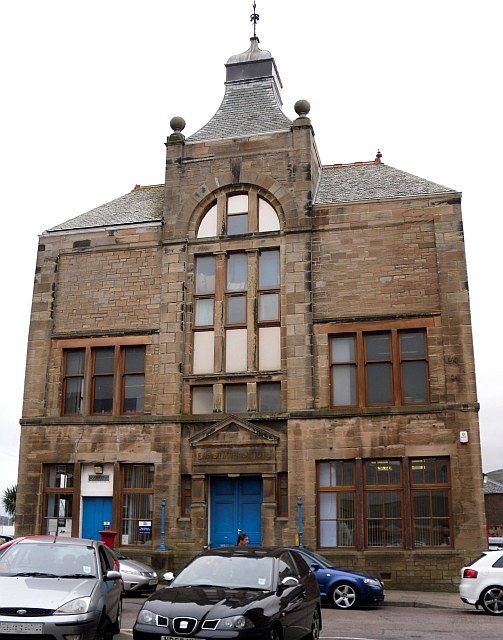
- The Christian Institute, Campbeltown
- Interactive map of the The Christian Institute, Campbeltown area

General information
- Architectural style: French Renaissance
- Location: Campbeltown, Argyll and Bute, Old Quay Head, Scotland
- Coordinates: 55°25′28.2″N 5°36′14″W
- Opened: 28 June 1887
- Cost: £2,683 (equivalent to £305,000 in 2025)
- Client: Campbeltown YMCA

Design and construction
- Architect: Henry Edward Clifford
- Designations: Category C listed building

The Christian Institute, Campbeltown is a Category C listed building in Campbeltown, Argyll and Bute.

== History ==
The Campbeltown YMCA was formed in 1882 with 18 members. By 1885 the numbers had grown to 100 and the membership decided to erect their own premises. The site on Old Quay Head was donated by Miss Mactavish. The building was intended not only as a meeting place for the YMCA, but also for meetings of the Campbeltown YWCA, Bible classes, Sabbath-School work, seamen’s meetings, lectures, music classes etc.

The building was designed by the architect Henry Edward Clifford and opened on 27 June 1887 by Arthur Kinnaird, 11th Lord Kinnaird. A circle headed doorway 6 feet (1.8 m) wide opened into an entrance hall which provided access to the upper floor for the large hall 45 feet (14 m) by 44 feet 6 inches (13.56 m) and reading-room 19 feet (5.8 m) square. On the same floor was a reading room and committee room.

Above the doorway was a large circle-headed mullioned and transomed window 10 feet (3.0 m) wide by 25 feet (7.6 m) high, having projecting butts on each side, and finished on top with a mansard roof tower and crown cresting.

On the left of the principal entrance was the refreshment rooms of the Bread and Flour Company measuring 19 feet (5.8 m) square, and on the right the entrance to the small hall 40 feet (12 m) by 19 feet 6 inches (5.94 m) seated for 148 persons. The windows on each side of the lower floor rooms were 6 feet (1.8 m) wide by 12 feet (3.7 m) high divided by wood astragals. The lower floor also comprised three offices and a janitor’s house of two apartments.
