= Torrisdale, Argyll =

Village on the eastern coast of the Kintyre Peninsula of Scotland

Coordinates: 55.571818°N 5.496516°W

Torrisdale is a small village on the eastern coast of the Kintyre Peninsula of Scotland. The village is along Torrisdale Bay, an inlet of the Kilbrannan Sound. It is the location of Torrisdale Castle, a 19th-century castle that is now a tourist destination.
