= Torrisdale Castle =

Historic mansion residence in Scotland

Coordinates: 55°34′8″N 5°30′5″W

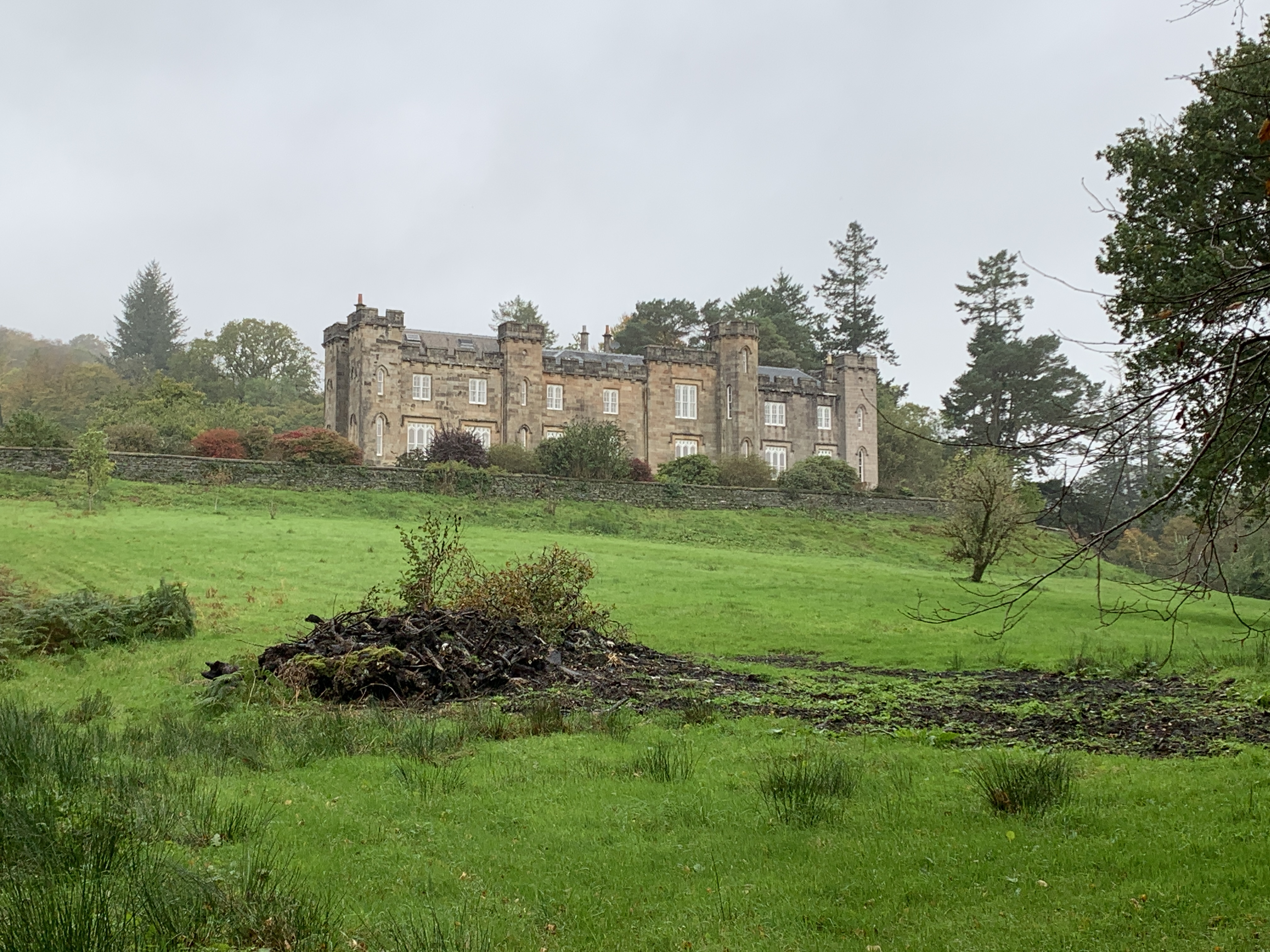
- The castle in 2021
- Interactive map of Torrisdale Castle

Torrisdale Castle is a historic mansion residence, overlooking Torrisdale Bay, Argyll, south of Carradale, Kintyre, Scotland. The castle is situated at the edge of the village of Torrisdale. It is a category B listed building.

== History ==
The mansion was built in 1815, by General Keith Macalister, of Loup and Torrisdale in 1815. Designed by architect James Gillespie Graham, the mansion is castellated and consists of two storeys and a basement. Further extensions occurred in the 1900s.

The estate is home to the Macalister Hall family who have owned Torrisdale since 1890. A number of lodges, cottages, houses and even an apartment within the castle are available as self-catering accommodation. An organic Tannery & gin distillery also run on the estate.
