= Campbeltown Town Hall =

Municipal building in Campbeltown, Scotland

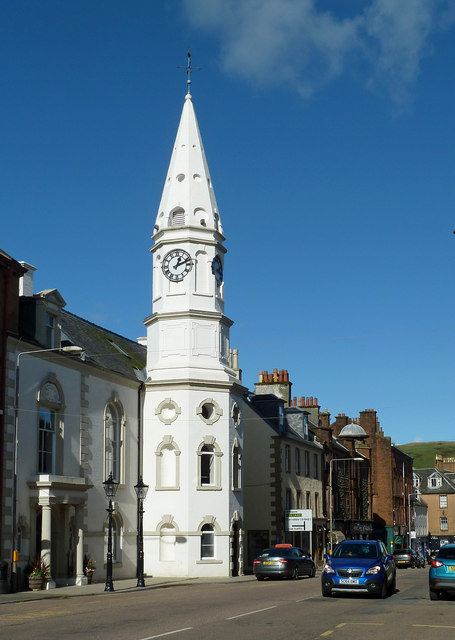
- Campbeltown Town Hall

- Shown in Argyll and Bute
- 55.4239°N 5.6059°W
- Location: Main Street, Campbeltown

History
- Built: 1760

Site notes
- Architect: John Douglas
- Architectural style: Italianate style

Listed Building – Category B
- Official name: Main Street, Town Hall, including lamp standards
- Designated: 20 July 1971
- Reference no.: LB22918

Campbeltown Town Hall is a municipal structure on Main Street in Campbeltown, Argyll and Bute, Scotland. It serves as a venue for community events and is a Category B listed building.

== History ==
The first municipal building in the town was a tolbooth which dated back to the appointment of Archibald Campbell, 9th Earl of Argyll as the local laird in the 17th century. It consisted of a prison on the ground floor and an assembly room on the first floor. By the mid-18th century, it had become dilapidated and the burgh council decided to demolish it and to erect a new building on the same site. The new building was financed by a combination of an annual tax on the burgh inhabitants, by borrowing and by contributions from the local freemasons' lodge and from the Commissioner of Supply. The new building was designed by John Douglas, built in ashlar stone with a paint finish and was completed in 1760.

The design involved a symmetrical main frontage with three bays facing onto Main Street. The central bay was formed by a five-stage octagonal tower. There was a round headed doorway with a Gibbs surround flanked by round headed windows in the first stage, a series of round headed windows in the second stage, a row of oculi with voussoirs at the cardinal points in the third stage, a series of blind panels in the fourth stage and alternating niches and clock faces in the fifth stage, with a timber spire and weather vane above. The outer bays were fenestrated by squat round headed windows on the ground floor and tall round headed windows on the first floor. Internally, the principal rooms were the prison cells on the ground floor and the assembly hall on the first floor.

The original timber spire was replaced by a stone structure to a design by John Brown of Inveraray in 1778 and, a clock, designed and manufactured by John Townsend of Greenock, together with a bell, cast in Bristol, were installed in a new tower in 1779. Following a critical report by a prisons inspector, the prisoners in the cells were relocated to a new prison facility in Castlehill in 1848, and the building was extended by one bay to the southwest to a design by Campbell Douglas in 1866. The extra bay contained a portico formed by Doric order columns supporting an entablature on the ground floor, and by a round headed window, containing the burgh coat of arms in the tympanum of the window, on the first floor. There was a dormer window at roof level. The interior of the building was also remodelled at that time with the disused prison cells being converted to form a council chamber. The building continued to serve as the meeting place of the burgh council for much of the 20th century but ceased to be the local seat of government when the enlarged Argyll District Council was formed in 1975.

The building was acquired by the South Kintyre Development Trust in October 2014 and a major programme of refurbishment works, to a design by Coltart Earley, was completed in August 2016. The programme of works, which cost some £2 million and involved the conversion of the ground floor to commercial offices and the installation of a new lift to the assembly hall on the first floor, was financed by various bodies including Historic Scotland, the Heritage Lottery Fund, Highlands and Islands Enterprise, Argyll and Bute Council and the Townscape Heritage Initiative. The project, which also allowed the assembly hall to continue to operate as a venue for community events, won the Judges' Award in the Herald Property Awards in September 2016.

== See also ==
- List of listed buildings in Campbeltown
