= 17 cm mittlerer Minenwerfer =

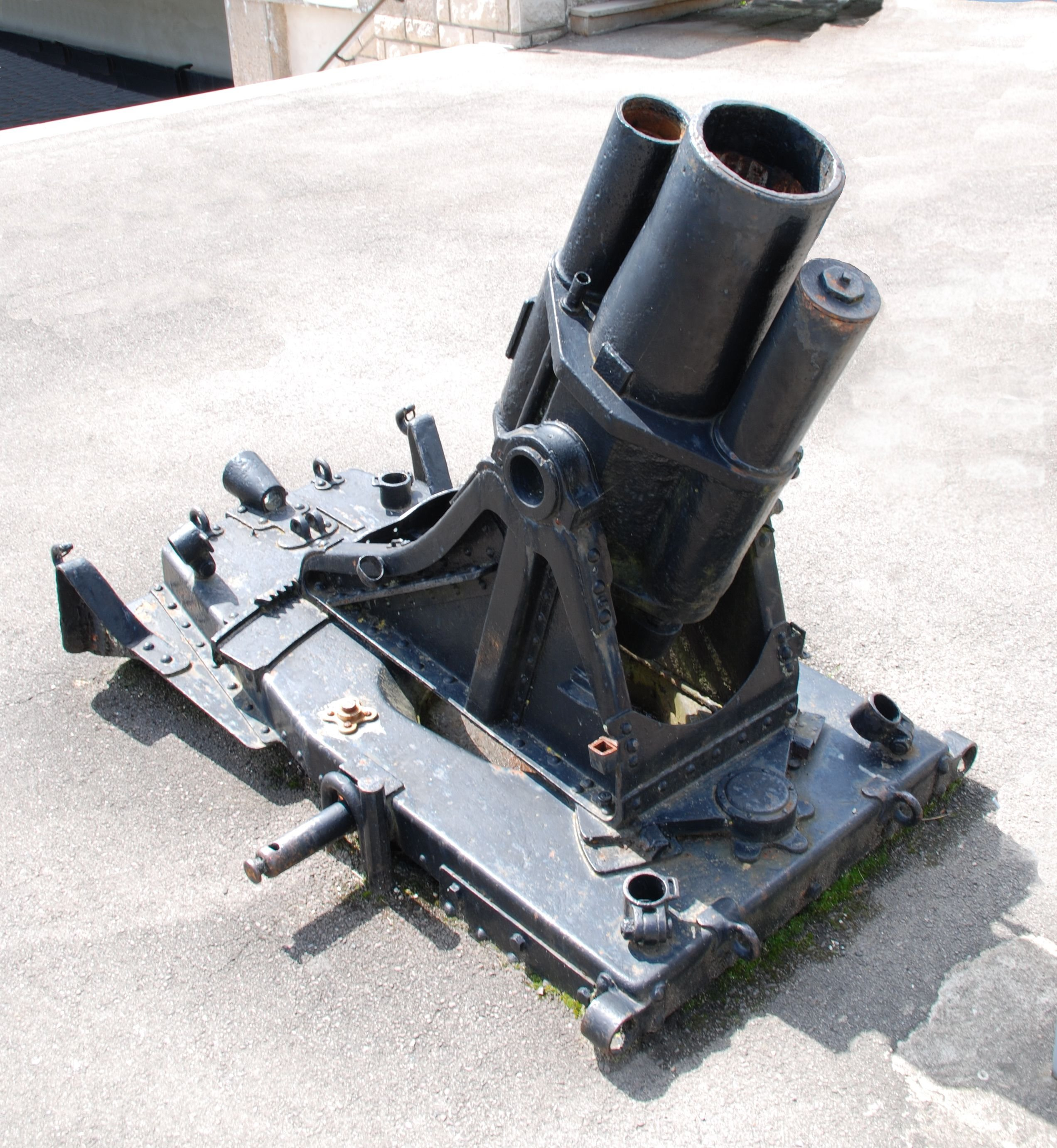
- 17 cm Minenwerfer n/A at the Verdun Memorial, Verdun, France
- Type: Medium trench mortar
- Place of origin: German Empire

Service history
- In service: 1913–1918
- Used by: German Empire; Latvia
- Wars: World War I

Production history
- Designer: Rheinmetall
- Manufacturer: Rheinmetall
- Produced: 1913–1918
- No. built: approx. 2361
- Variants: 17 cm mMW n/A

Specifications
- Mass: 483 kg (1,065 lbs)
- Barrel length: a/A: 64.6 cm (2 ft 1 in) L/3.8 n/A: 76.5 cm (2 ft 6 in) L/4.5
- Calibre: 170 mm (6.69 in)
- Recoil: hydro-spring
- Carriage: box trail
- Elevation: +45° to 90°
- Traverse: 25°
- Rate of fire: 20 rpm
- Muzzle velocity: 200 m/s (656 ft/s)
- Effective firing range: 300 m (325 yards)
- Maximum firing range: 1,600 meters (1,700 yd)
- Sights: panoramic

The 17 cm mittlerer Minenwerfer (17 cm mMW) was a mortar used by Germany in World War I.

== Development and use ==
The weapon was developed for use by engineer troops after the Siege of Port Arthur during the Russo-Japanese War of 1905, designed to combat heavier mortars by flinging a lighter shell further in defense of a fortress. It was a muzzle-loading, rifled mortar that had a standard hydro-spring recoil system. It fired 50 kilogram (110 lb) HE shells, which contained far more explosive filler than ordinary artillery shells of the same caliber. The low muzzle velocity allowed for thinner shell walls, hence more space for filler. Furthermore, the low velocity allowed for the use of explosives like ammonium nitrate-carbon that were less shock-resistant than TNT, which was in short supply. This caused a large number of premature detonations that made crewing the Minenwerfer riskier than normal artillery pieces. It was also capable of firing 40 kg gas shells.

A new version of the weapon, with a longer barrel, was put into production at some point during the war. It was called the 17 cm mMW n/A (neuer Art) or 'new pattern', while the older model was termed the a/A (alter Art) or 'old pattern'. The a/A models were also modified into the 16a & 16b, with the 16a having a barrel extension screwed onto the old barrel, and the b being created by replacing the barrel of the old model with a rifled barrel blank which was 4cm shorter than the new model barrels.

In action the mMW was emplaced in a pit, after its wheels were removed, not less than 1.5 meters deep to protect it and its crew. It could be towed short distances by four men or carried by 17. Despite its extremely short range, the mMW proved to be very effective at destroying bunkers and other field fortifications. Consequently, its numbers went from 116 in service when the war broke out to some 2,361 in 1918.

Two pieces of 17 cm mMW was also used by SS Heimwehr Danzig troops during the invasion of Poland.

== Surviving examples ==
- The Central Museum of The Royal Regiment of Canadian Artillery, Shilo, Manitoba
- At the Australian War Memorial, Canberra
- Also in Auburn, Massachusetts, an early short barrel model survives at the American Legion Hall
- a/A (1917 Rh.MF. Nr.4490) at the Queensland Museum, Brisbane
- n/A (1917 Rh.MF. Nr.5988) at the Perth Zoo (entrance), West Australia
- n/A (1917 ZWC. Nr.4986) at the War Memorial Garden, Berry, NSW
- n/A (1917 Sächsische Maschinen Fabrik Nr 5184) at the Campbeltown Heritage Centre, Scotland
- 4980 outside the District Council Service Center, Roxburgh, Otago New Zealand.
- Wilbur Avenue, Cranston, Rhode Island
- Memorial Hall, Monson, Massachusetts
- Falls Park, Pendleton, Indiana USA
- Stavely Centennial Park in Stavely, Alberta has a short-barrelled version (serial number 1972) of the mortar on display along with a Spandau machine gun.
- The Vytautas the Great War Museum Home
- Royal Canadian Legion Branch #15 Harbour Grace
- Monuments aux Morts, Saint-Vran, Côtes d'Armor, France
- National Museum of the Marine Corps, Quantico, Virginia (2)
- Royal Canadian Legion Branch #138 Sydney, Nova Scotia

== See also ==
- Minenwerfer
- 7.58 cm leichte Minenwerfer
- 25 cm schwerer Minenwerfer

== Photo Gallery ==
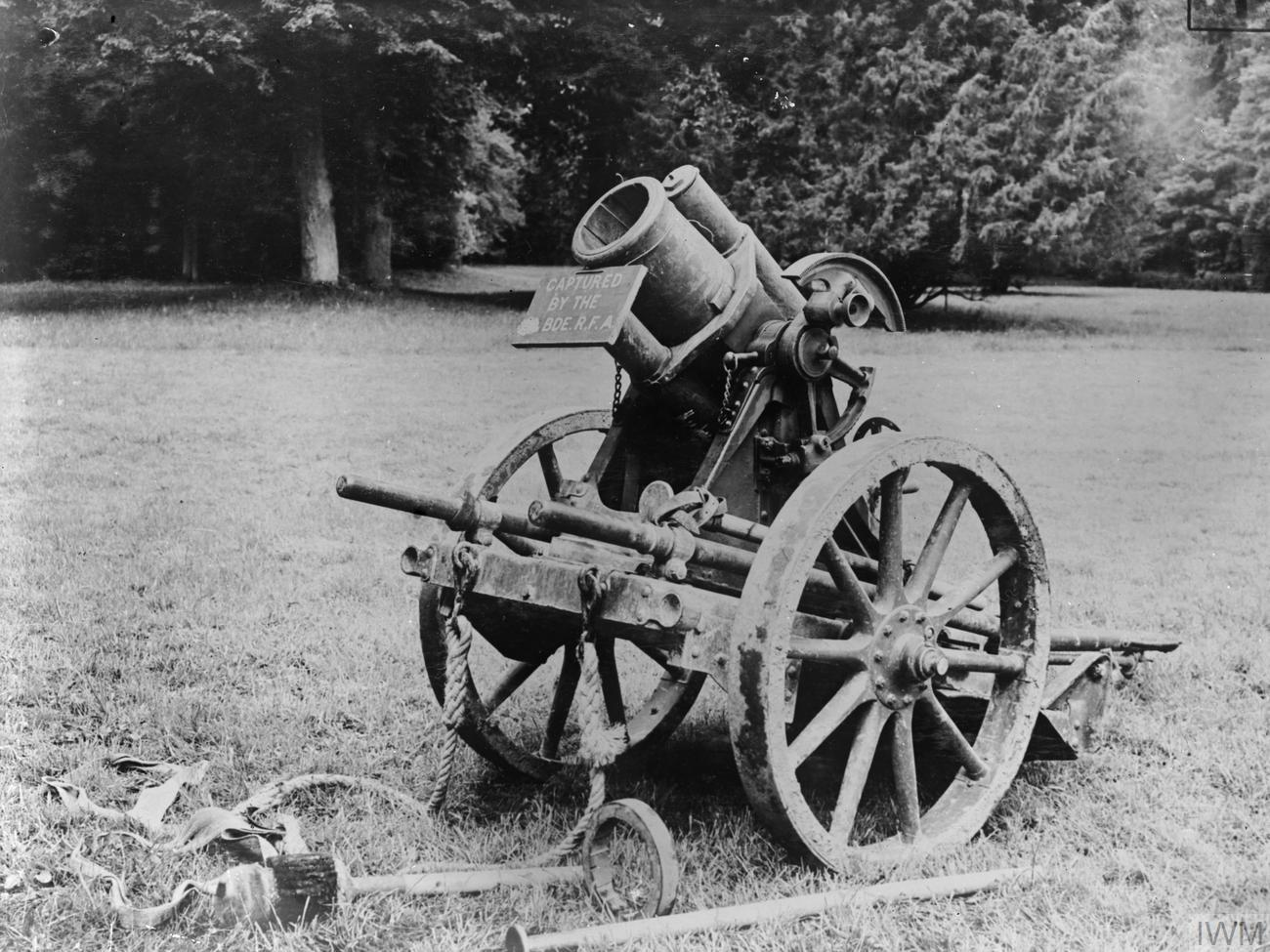
An early short barreled version on its carriage

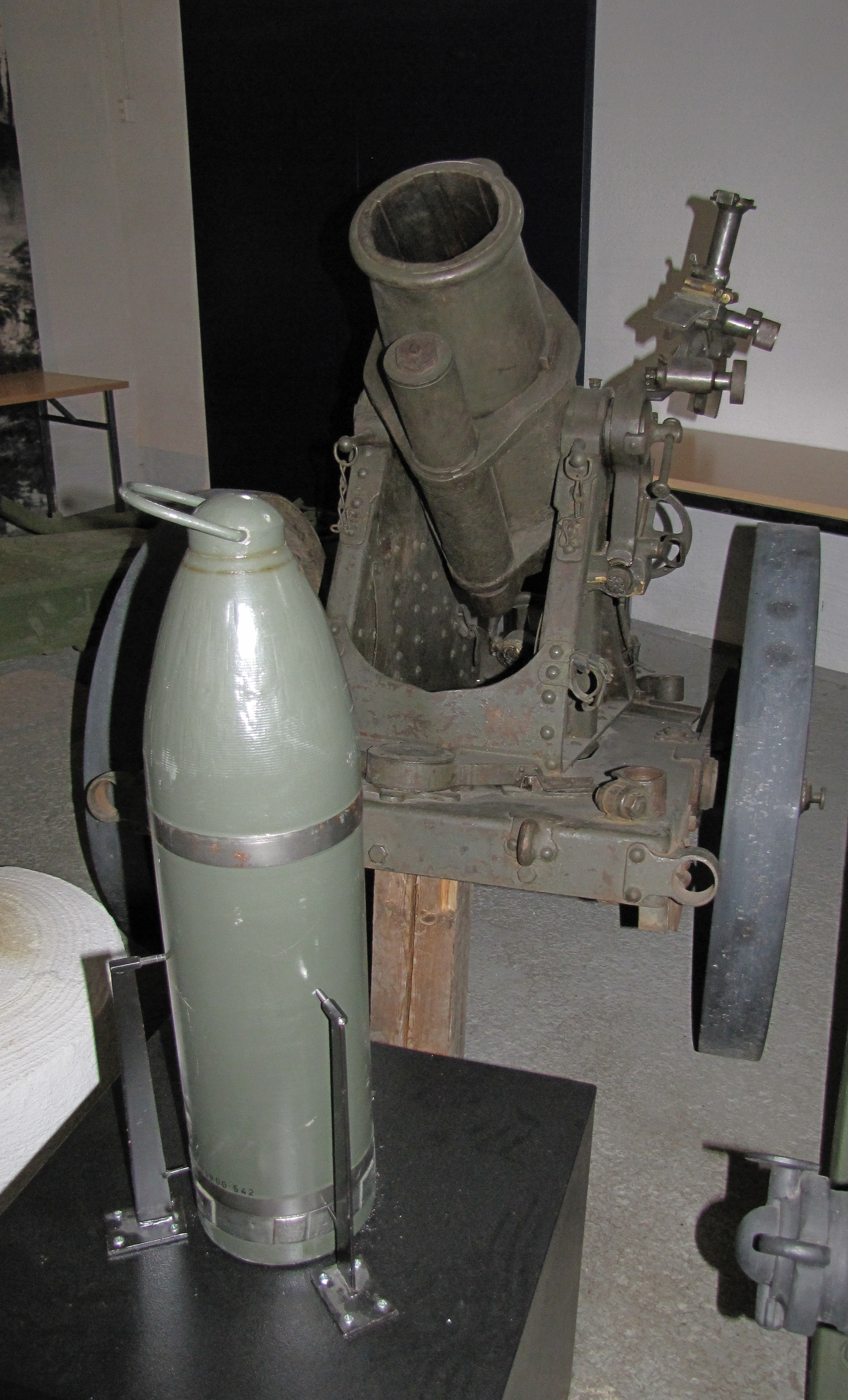
The a/A model in transport mode, with wheels attached

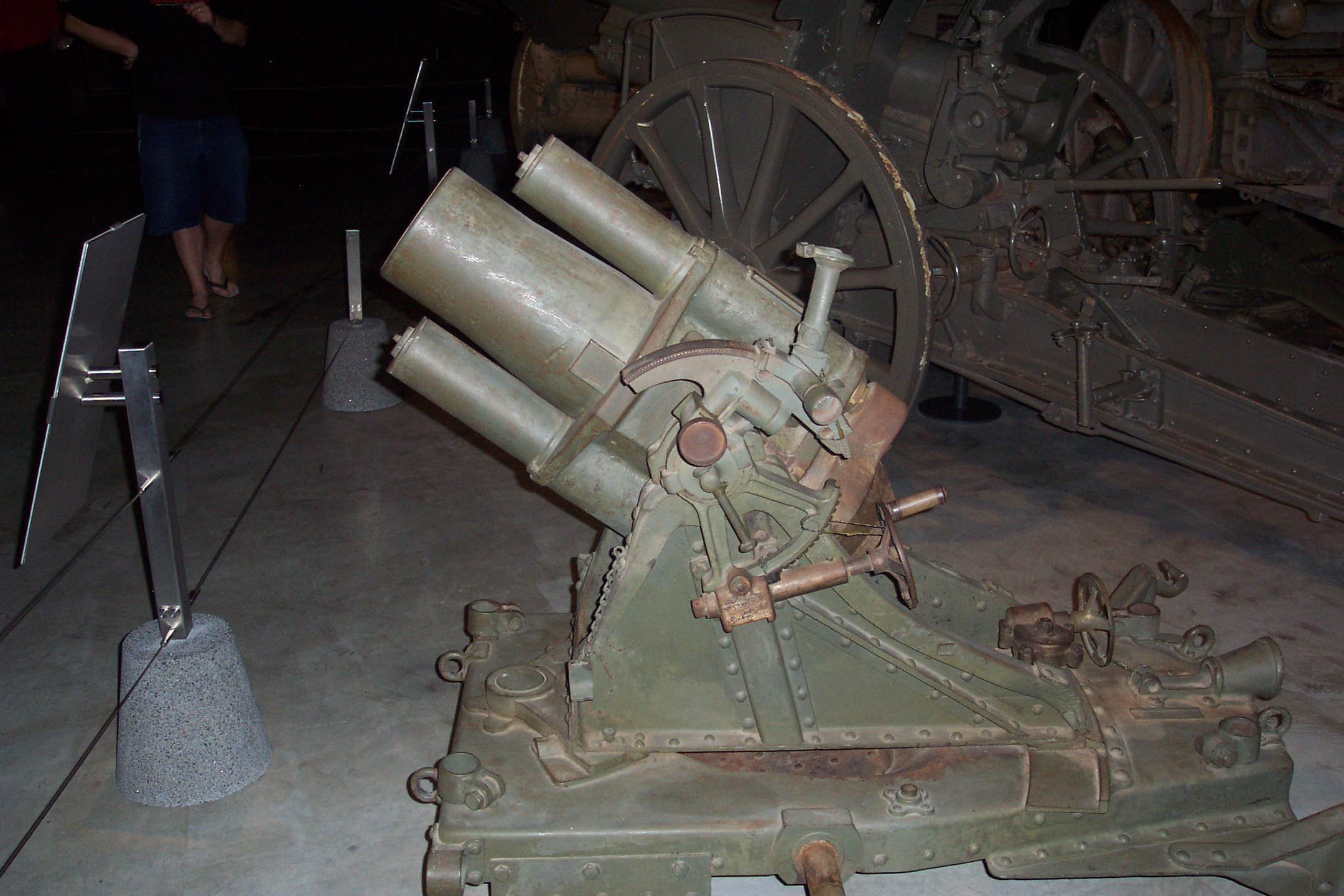
The n/A model (with long barrel), at the Australian War Memorial, Canberra

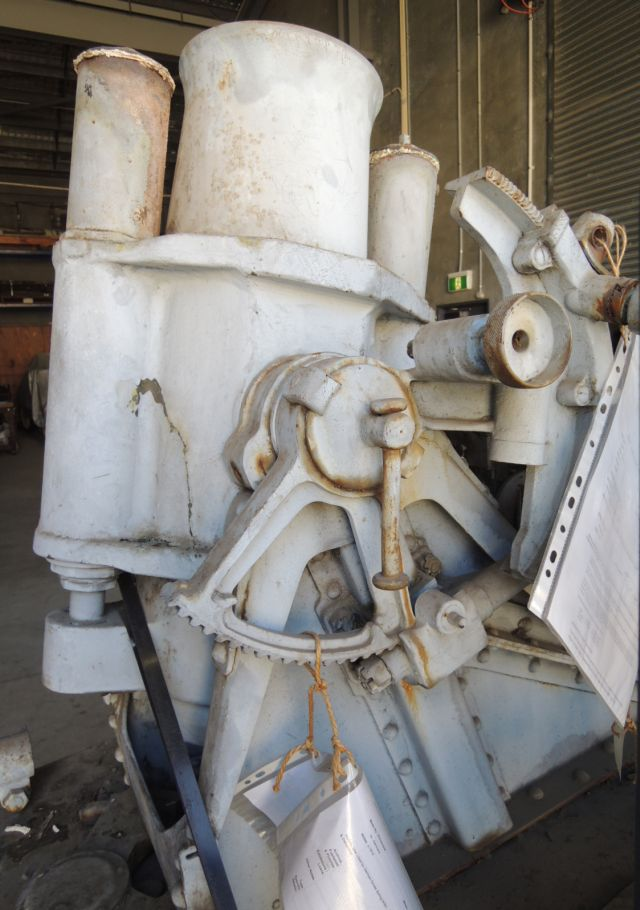
1917 a/A mMW Nr.5753 at the Queensland Museum, Brisbane

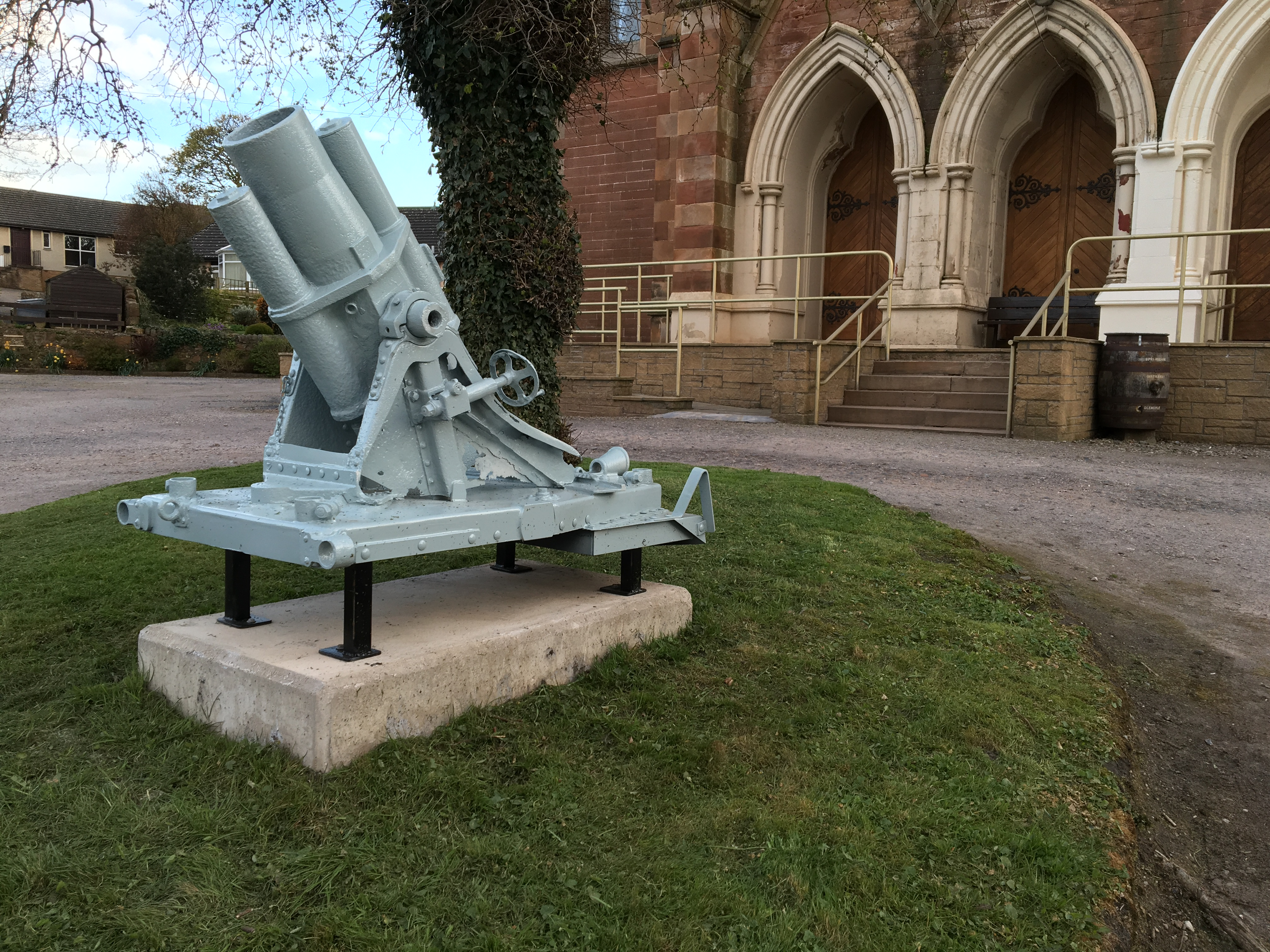
The 1917 n/A model Minenwerfer in the grounds of Campbeltown Heritage Centre, Scotland

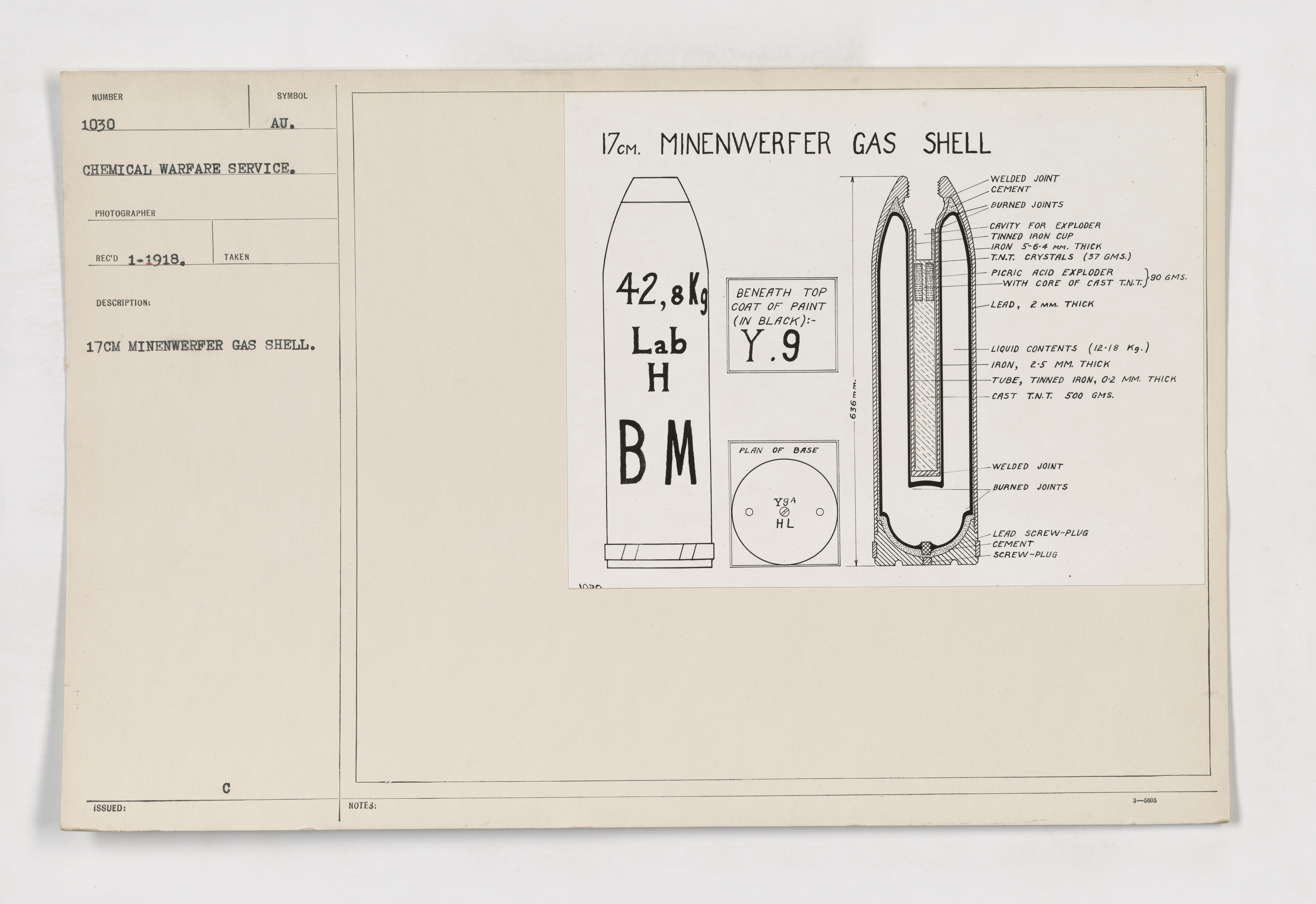
A diagram of a 17 cm chemical shell

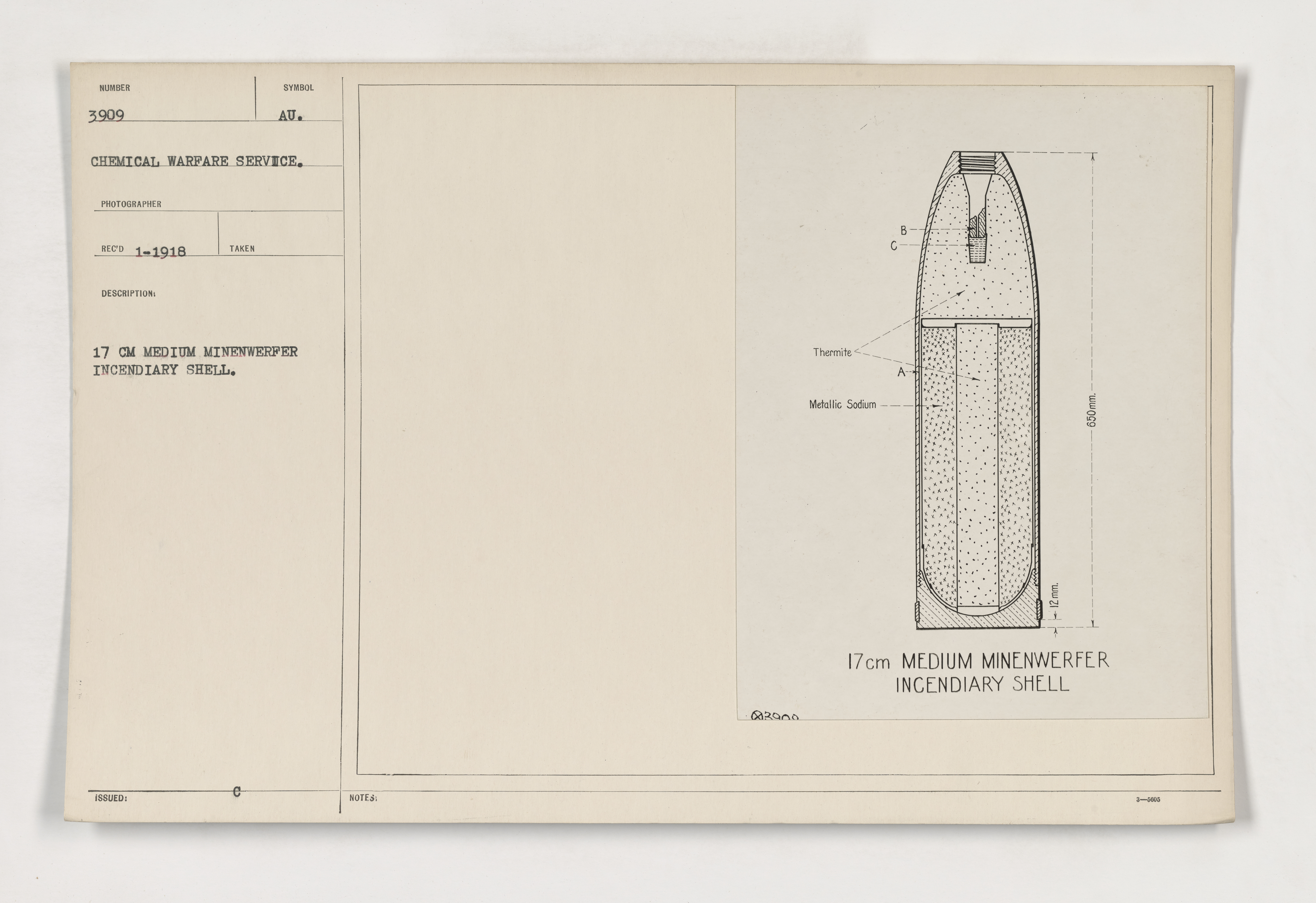
A diagram of a 17 cm incendiary shell

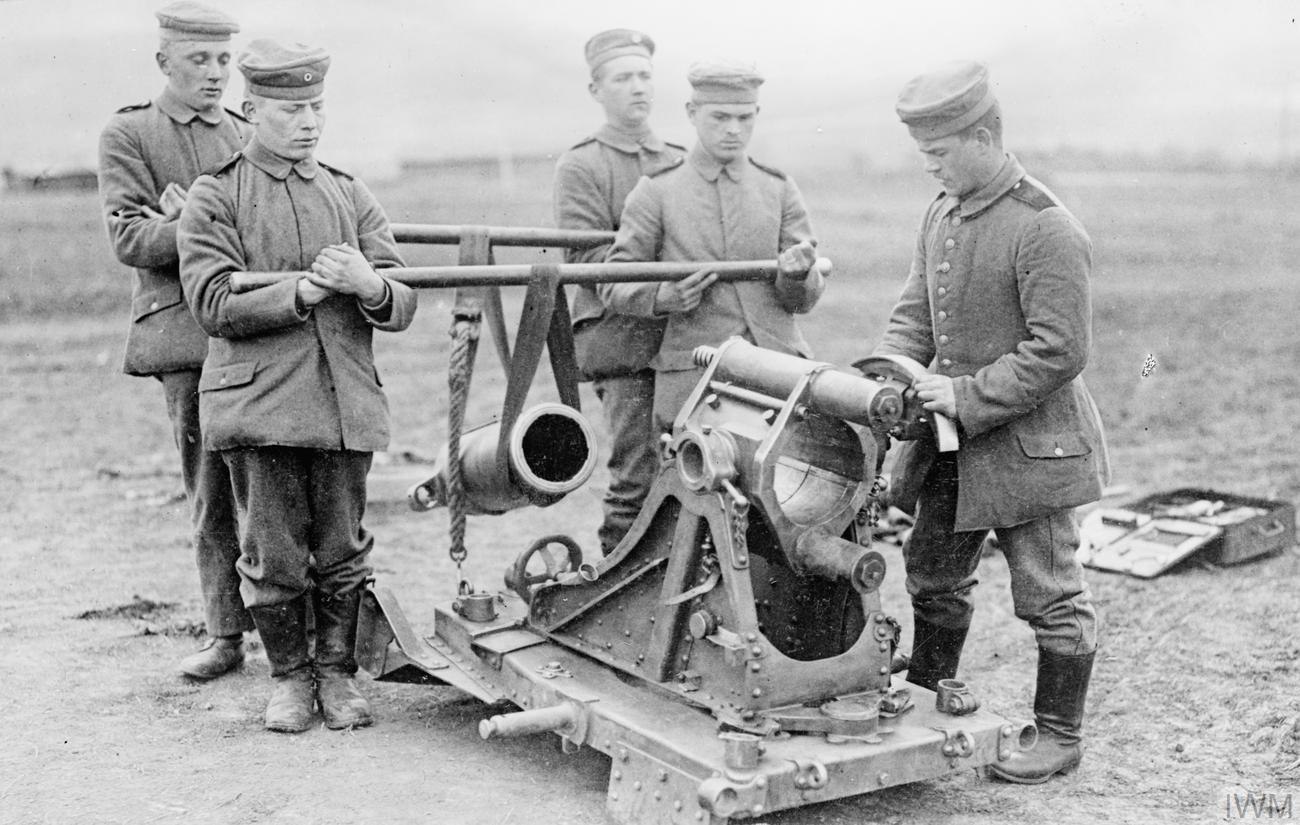
A 17 cm Minenwerfer being assembled

== Bibliography ==
- Jäger, Herbert. (2001). German Artillery of World War One. Ramsbury, Marlborough, Wiltshire: Crowood Press. ISBN 1-86126-403-8.
