= Denzil Meyrick =

Scottish writer (1965–2025)

- Born: 28 November 1965; Glasgow, Scotland
- Died: 14 February 2025 (aged 59)
- Education: Paisley University
- Writing career
- Genre: Crime fiction

Denzil Meyrick (28 November 1965 – 14 February 2025) was a Scottish bestselling novelist. Prior to that, he served as a police officer with Strathclyde Police then a manager with Springbank Distillery in Campbeltown, Argyll. From 2012 onwards, Denzil Meyrick worked as a writer of Scottish crime fiction novels. He was also an executive director of media production company Houses of Steel.

== Life and career ==
Denzil Meyrick was educated at Campbeltown Grammar School, Argyll and then completed tertiary education at the University of Paisley. He was an author and his main series of novels are eleven books of the Detective Chief Inspector (DCI) Jim Daley crime thriller series, set in the fictitious town of 'Kinloch', which is modelled on Campbeltown. Denzil Meyrick draws from experience during his twenties when he saw service as a police officer with Strathclyde Police. After his time there he followed a varied career, including the management of a distillery in Campbeltown. He had many diverse roles, ranging from the director of a large engineering company to freelance journalism in both print and on radio.

In 2012, his first crime fiction novel, Whisky From Small Glasses was published. It was the first of his DCI Daley series. This novel was reprinted in 2014 by Polygon, a division of Birlinn. Following publication of that first story, Meyrick signed with Birlinn, where his next crime novels were published under the Polygon imprint. He is also published by HarperCollins Germany, and Aria in the United States.

Meyrick died on 14 February 2025, at the age of 59.

== Novels ==
=== DCI Jim Daley series ===
- Whisky From Small Glasses (2012)
- The Last Witness (2014)
- Dark Suits & Sad Songs (2015)
- The Rat Stone Serenade (2016)
- Well of the Winds (2017)
- The Relentless Tide (2018)
- A Breath on Dying Embers (2019)
- Jeremiah’s Bell (2020)
- For Any Other Truth (2021)
- The Death of Remembrance (2022)
- No Sweet Sorrow (2023)
- Last Orders (2025)

=== Frank Grasby series ===
- Murder at Holly House (2023)
- The Christmas Stocking Murders (2024)
- The Misletoe Wedding Murders (2026)

== Anthology and short stories ==
- Dalintober Moon (2014)
- Two One Three (2015)
- Empty Nets and Promises (2016)
- Single End (2016)
- One Last Dram Before Midnight (2017) (anthology of DCI Daley short stories)
