= Lorne Street Church, Campbeltown =

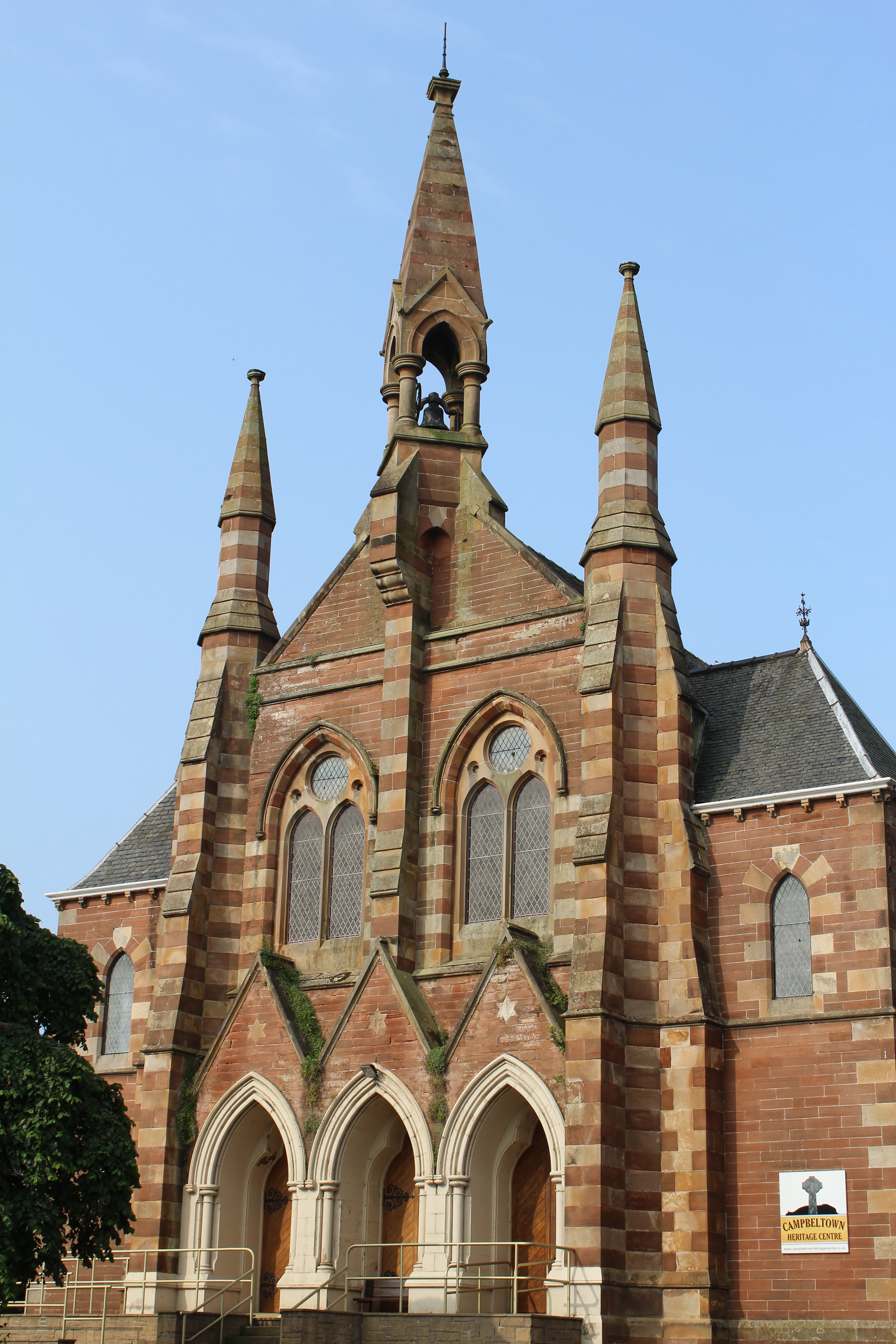
- Lorne Street Church, Campbeltown
- Lorne Street Church, Campbeltown
- 55°25′29.3″N 5°36′27″W
- Location: Campbeltown, Argyll and Bute
- Country: Scotland
- Denomination: Church of Scotland
- Previous denomination: Gaelic Free Church

History
- Status: Parish church

Architecture
- Functional status: Closed
- Heritage designation: Category C listed building
- Designated: 28 March 1996
- Architect: James Boucher
- Style: Polychromatic gothic
- Completed: 30 August 1868
- Closed: 30 December 1990

Specifications
- Capacity: 1,000 persons

Lorne Street Church is a Category C listed building in Campbeltown, Argyll and Bute.

== History ==
The foundation stone for the new church was laid on 27 November 1867 by Revd. Dr. Thomas McLachlan of St Columba's Edinburgh and Provost Beith.

It was opened for worship on 30 August 1868 having been designed by Glasgow architect James Boucher and bears a striking resemblance to the Church and Friary of St Francis, Gorton, Manchester by Edward Pugin which was built between 1866 and 1872. The layers of alternate red and white sandstone led to the building becoming known as the "Tartan Kirk".

Church halls were added in 1889.

== Organ ==
The church originally had an organ by Hamlin and Mason which was installed at a cost of £120 (equivalent to £12,500 in 2025) shortly after the appointment of Revd. J.M. Macnaughton in 1907. This was replaced in 1920 by a 2 manual and pedal pipe organ by Lewis & Co which was given by Councillor D. Smith and C.C. Maxtone, the organist. It was moved from Landsdowne Church, Glasgow.

== Closure ==
In 1989 the General Assembly of the Church of Scotland ruled that Campbeltown should reduce the number of ministers in the town from three to two. The presbytery of South Argyll was left to make the necessary changes. Lorne Street Church merged with Lowland Church and the decision taken to close Lorne Street.

It is now Campbeltown Heritage Centre.
