= Campbeltown Parish Church =

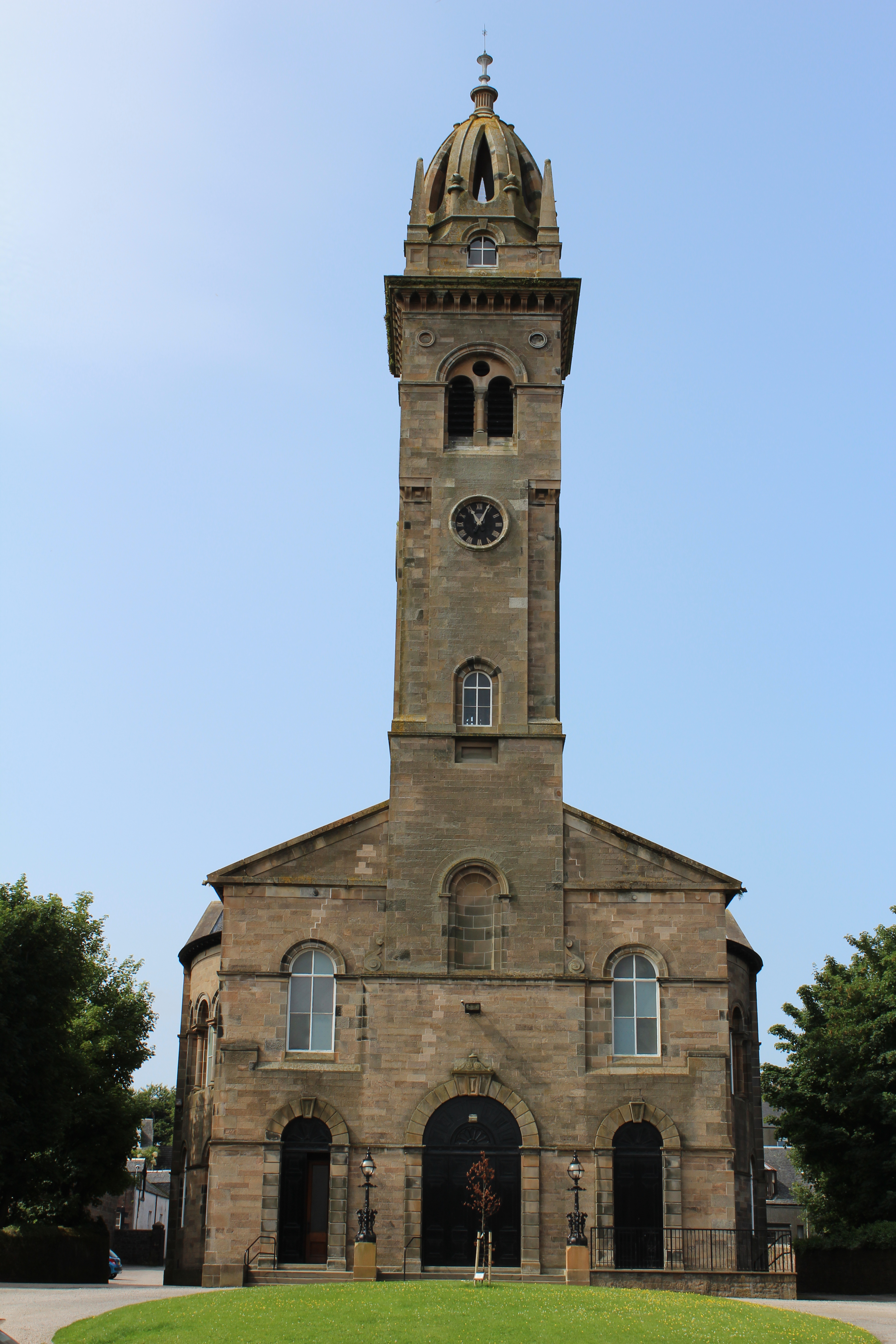
- Campbeltown Parish Church
- Campbeltown Parish Church
- 55°25′28.7″N 5°36′31″W
- Location: Campbeltown, Argyll and Bute
- Country: Scotland
- Denomination: Church of Scotland
- Previous denomination: United Presbyterian

History
- Former name(s): Campbeltown Lorne and Lowland Parish Church (1990-2023); Campbeltown Lowland Parish Church (1971-90); Campbeltown Longrow Parish Church (1929-71); Campbeltown Longrow United Free Church (1900-29); Campbeltown United Presbyterian Church (1847-1900)
- Status: Parish church

Architecture
- Functional status: Active
- Heritage designation: Category B listed building
- Designated: 28 August 1980
- Architect: John Burnet
- Style: Greco-Italian
- Completed: 14 July 1872
- Construction cost: £11,000 (equivalent to £1,075,500 in 2025)

Specifications
- Capacity: 950 persons

Administration
- Parish: Campbeltown

Campbeltown Parish Church is a Category B listed building in Campbeltown, Argyll and Bute.

== History ==
The church began life as a United Presbyterian Church. In the early seventeenth century a colony of Lowlanders crossed from Ayrshire and settled in Kintyre. A second influx came during the Protectorate of Cromwell which comprised Covenanters. This was followed by Lowland emigrants from Galloway and Wigtown around the start of the eighteenth century. As they spoke no Gaelic, they kept themselves separate from the local population and by voluntary effort built their first church. By 1706 it was too small and a new building was opened. This was replaced again in 1767 by the Longrow Relief Church just to the north of the site of the present building.

Construction of the new church started in June 1870 and it was opened for worship on 14 July 1872. It was built to the designs of Glasgow architect John Burnet.

In 1989 the General Assembly of the Church of Scotland ruled that Campbeltown should reduce the number of ministers in the town from three to two. The presbytery of South Argyll was left to make the necessary changes. Lorne Street Church merged with Lowland Church and the decision taken to close Lorne Street.

In 2023 Highland Parish Church, Campbeltown was closed and the congregations joined to create Campbeltown Parish Church.

== Organ ==
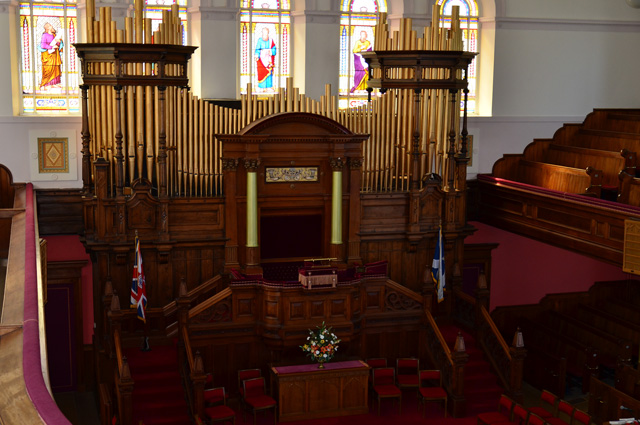
The organ

The church contained a 2 manual and pedal pipe organ by Brindley & Foster dating from 1895 but this has now been replaced.
