= Campbeltown Heritage Centre =

Coordinates: 55°25′23″N 5°36′28″W

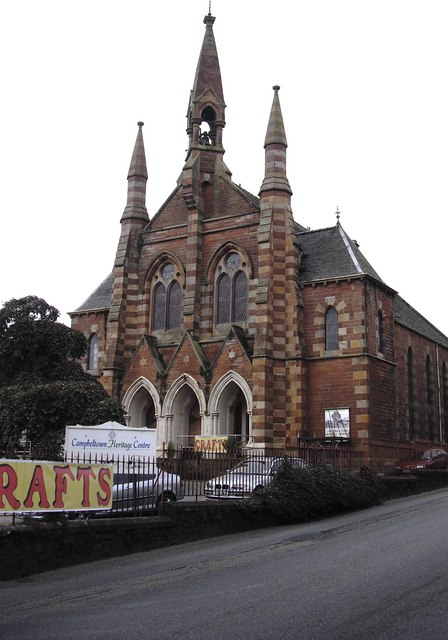
- Established: 1995
- Location: 3 Big Kiln St, Campbeltown PA28 6JF, United Kingdom
- Type: Museum and Heritage Centre
- Website: https://campbeltownheritagecentre.co.uk

The Campbeltown Heritage Centre is a museum and heritage centre in Campbeltown, Argyll, Scotland. The centre is the main repository for social history for the Kintyre Peninsula from around 1700 to the present day, and is run by the Kintyre Amenity Trust.

== History ==
Kintyre Amenity Trust (KAT) was formed in 1998 to lease the recently redundant Lorne Street Church from the Church of Scotland and open a Heritage Centre to complement the existing Campbeltown Museum whose exhibits focused on archaeology and natural history. With grants and contributions from the local community the trustees established a museum that highlighted the different aspects of Campbeltown's success - it had the highest per capita income for any town in Scotland. This was based not only on the herring fishing industry but also coal, shipbuilding, whisky and agriculture. Exhibits were donated by many local people and the museum now holds a premier collection.

In 2012 KAT opened Campbeltown Backpackers in the old Free Church School. This provides a modest revenue stream to support the activities in the museum.

The Lorne Street Church was built in 1868 as a result of the Disruption in the Church of Scotland. The architect was James Boucher of Glasgow, perhaps inspired by a church recently built in Manchester by the leading Gothic architect of the day, E.W. Pugin. The highly unusual stripy pattern that emerged from the use of differently coloured bands of stone on the east front, rapidly led to the church being named colloquially as The Tartan Kirk.

In 2016 KAT celebrated The Year of Scottish Architecture with a display of pictures of key Campbeltown buildings using contemporary pictures by the McGory Brothers, pioneer photographers from the early twentieth century. Also the very rare Minenwerfer that had come to the care of KAT was conserved and redisplayed.

== Features ==
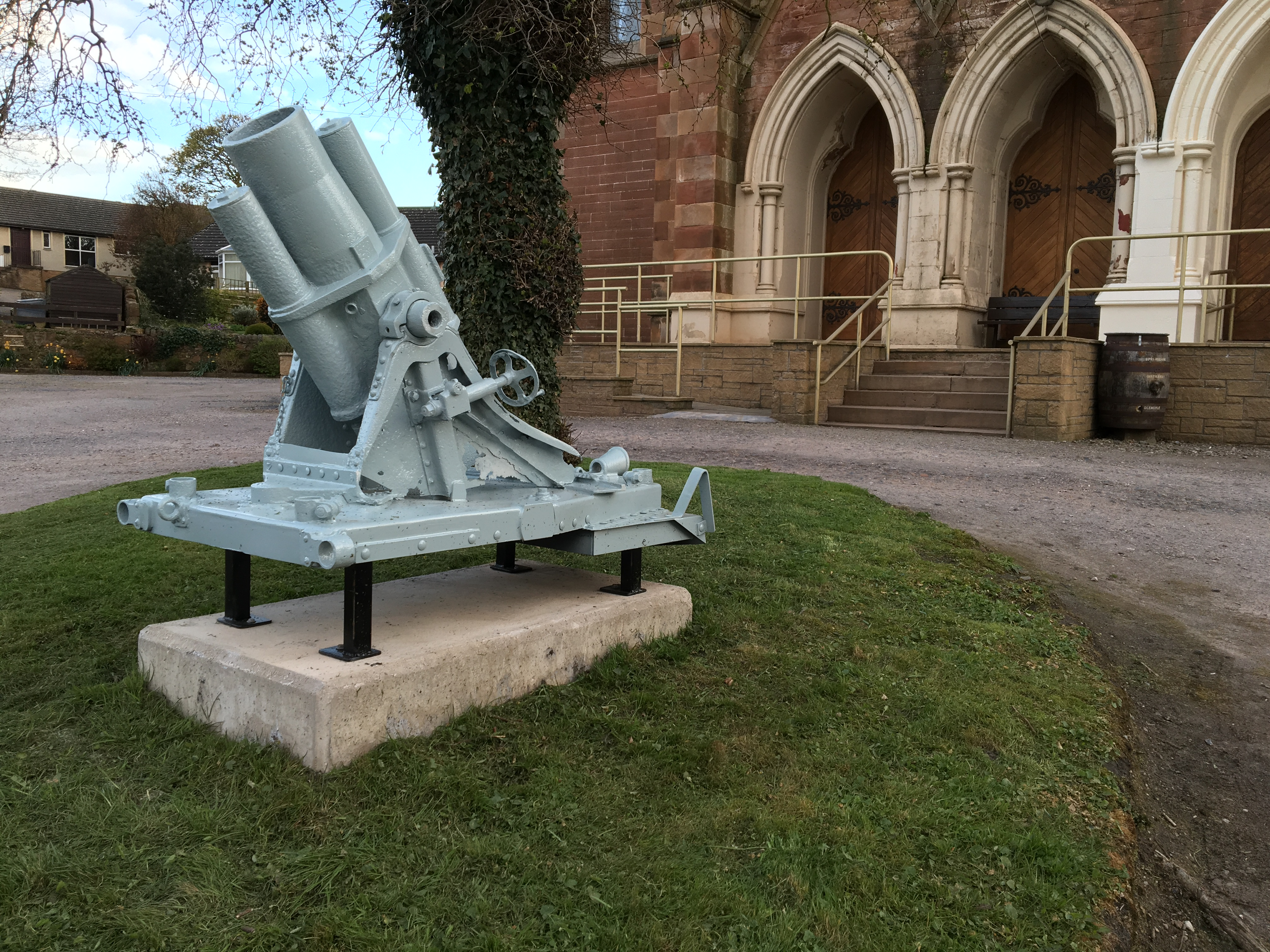
The n/A model in the grounds of Campbeltown Heritage Centre, Scotland

Social history of Campbeltown. Steamers were regular visitors to Campbeltown, as were navy vessels. Exports have included coal, whisky and herring, whilst shipbuilding was a major industry.

Coal mining has been mined in Kintyre since the 15th Century, although the grade of coal was not the best it was a popular export. A model village includes the light railway that ran between Machrihanish and Campbeltown.

A farming display showcases 400 years of farming in Kintyre and highlights the dairy and meat industries that are key to the prosperity of the area.

William McTaggart - a popular artist and one of Scotlands finest landscape painters whose work was inspired by the coastal landscapes.

In 2016, a conserved and stabilised German 17 cm mittlerer Minenwerfer (bomb thrower or mortar) was put on display in the grounds of the heritage centre. It is believed to be one of just eight surviving examples worldwide.
