= Highland Parish Church, Campbeltown =

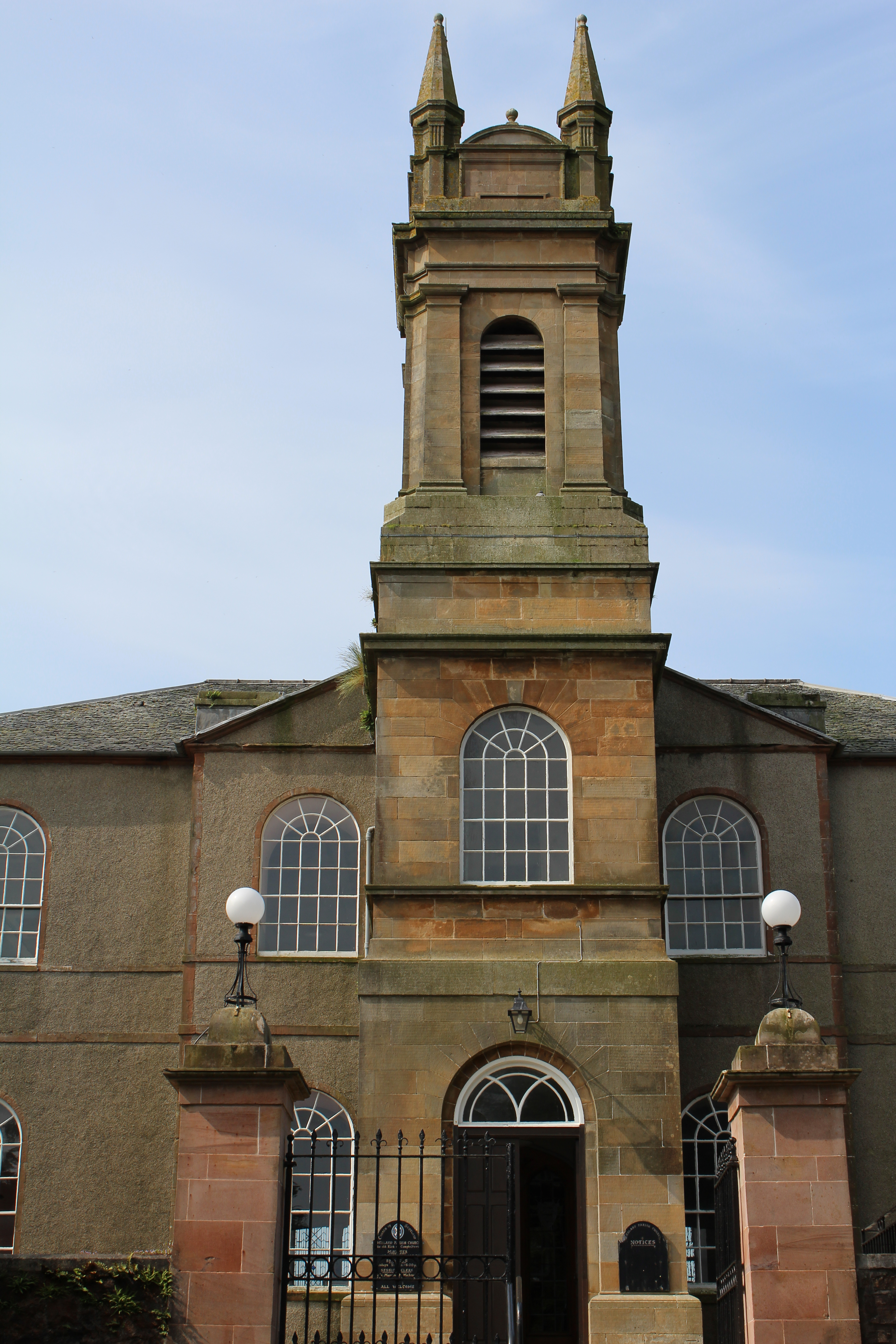
- Highland Parish Church, Campbeltown
- Highland Parish Church, Campbeltown
- 55°25′16.5″N 5°36′15″W
- Location: Campbeltown, Argyll and Bute
- Country: Scotland
- Denomination: Church of Scotland
- Previous denomination: Gaelic Church

History
- Status: Parish church

Architecture
- Functional status: Closed
- Heritage designation: Category B listed building
- Designated: 20 July 1971
- Architect: George Dempster
- Style: Classical
- Completed: 1808
- Closed: July 2023

Highland Parish Church is a Category B listed building in Campbeltown, Argyll and Bute.

== History ==
A Gaelic Church was built in 1642 at the south-east end of Kirk Street. By the early 19th century it was decided to replace it with a new building, and the congregation built Highland Parish Church between 1803 and 1808 at a cost of £2,395 (equivalent to £182,900 in 2025). The architect was George Dempster of Greenock and the superintendent for building was Robert Watt of Glasgow.

During construction the design of the steeple was changed, which resulted in the partial collapse of the building. On 18 November 1830 the steeple was struck by lightening. Damage was estimated at £300. It was rebuilt again in 1833 by John Baird of Glasgow. It was struck again by lightening on 19 December 1884 when 30 to 40 ft of the steeple was demolished and rebuilt in 1885.

A substantial renovation of the building was undertaken in 1924. The walls of the church were strapped and plastered, and the ceiling panelled with broad bands. The old gallery seating and flooring was cleared out, new flooring laid, and the seating rearranged and modernised. The two windows either side of the pulpit were replaced with new leaded glass. Two sunlights were installed in the ceiling, and the gas lighting was improved. The building was re-painted, the woodwork stained, and the passages laid with cork carpet.

== Organ ==
The first pipe organ in the church was installed in 1934. It was obtained second hand, having been built by Forster and Andrews of Hull in 1890 for Bothwell Parish Church in Glasgow. It was installed in Campbeltown by H. Hildson of Glasgow who re-built it with improvements.

A new small two manual and pedal pipe organ with 11 speaking stops by Harrison and Harrison was installed in 1954.

== Closure ==
In 2022 the Presbytery of Argyll decided to combine the two parish churches in Campbeltown and the congregation was merged with that of Lorne & Lowland Parish Church.

The church closed in 2023 and the building was offered for sale by the Church of Scotland.
