= Lochend Castle, Campbeltown =

Coordinates: 55.4224°N 5.6074°W

Lochend Castle (Scottish Gaelic: Caislen Cean Loch, Anglicised Castle of the loch end), was a castle located at Campbeltown, Argyll and Bute. The castle once stood at the top of Castlehill, Campbeltown and was once occupied by Clan MacDonald of Dunnyveg.

The castle was rebuilt by Archibald Campbell, 7th Earl of Argyll, around 1609. During the Wars of the Three Kingdoms, the castle appears to have been razed to the ground in 1647. A church was built on the remains of the castle in 1778.
