= Campbeltown =

Coordinates: 55.423°N 5.608°W

Campbeltown: Scottish Gaelic: Ceann Loch Chille Chiarain; Scots: Cammeltoun
- Town and former royal burgh
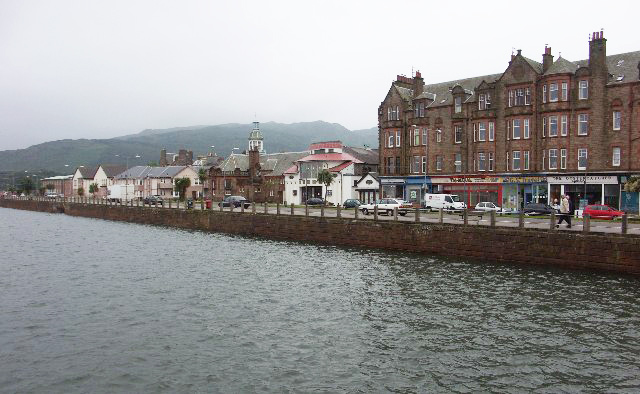
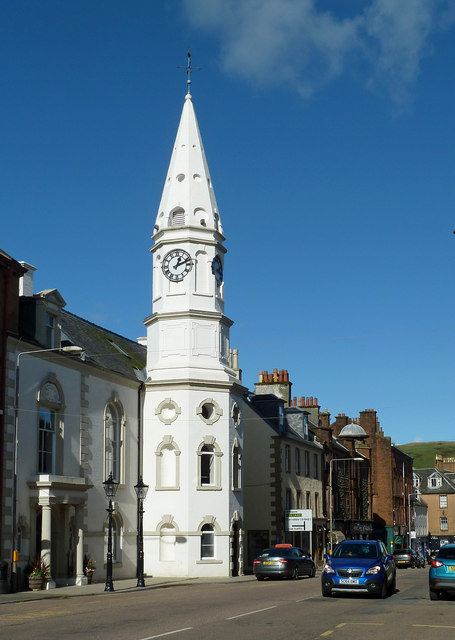
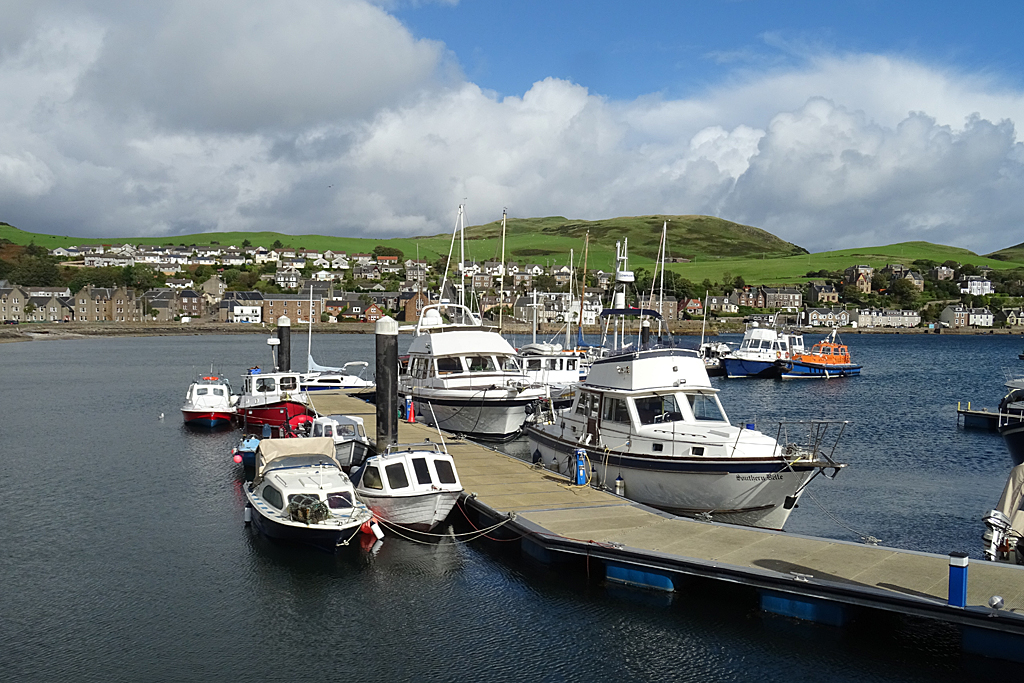
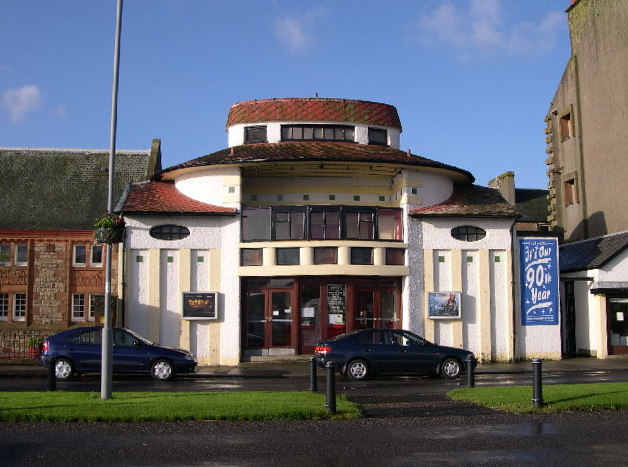
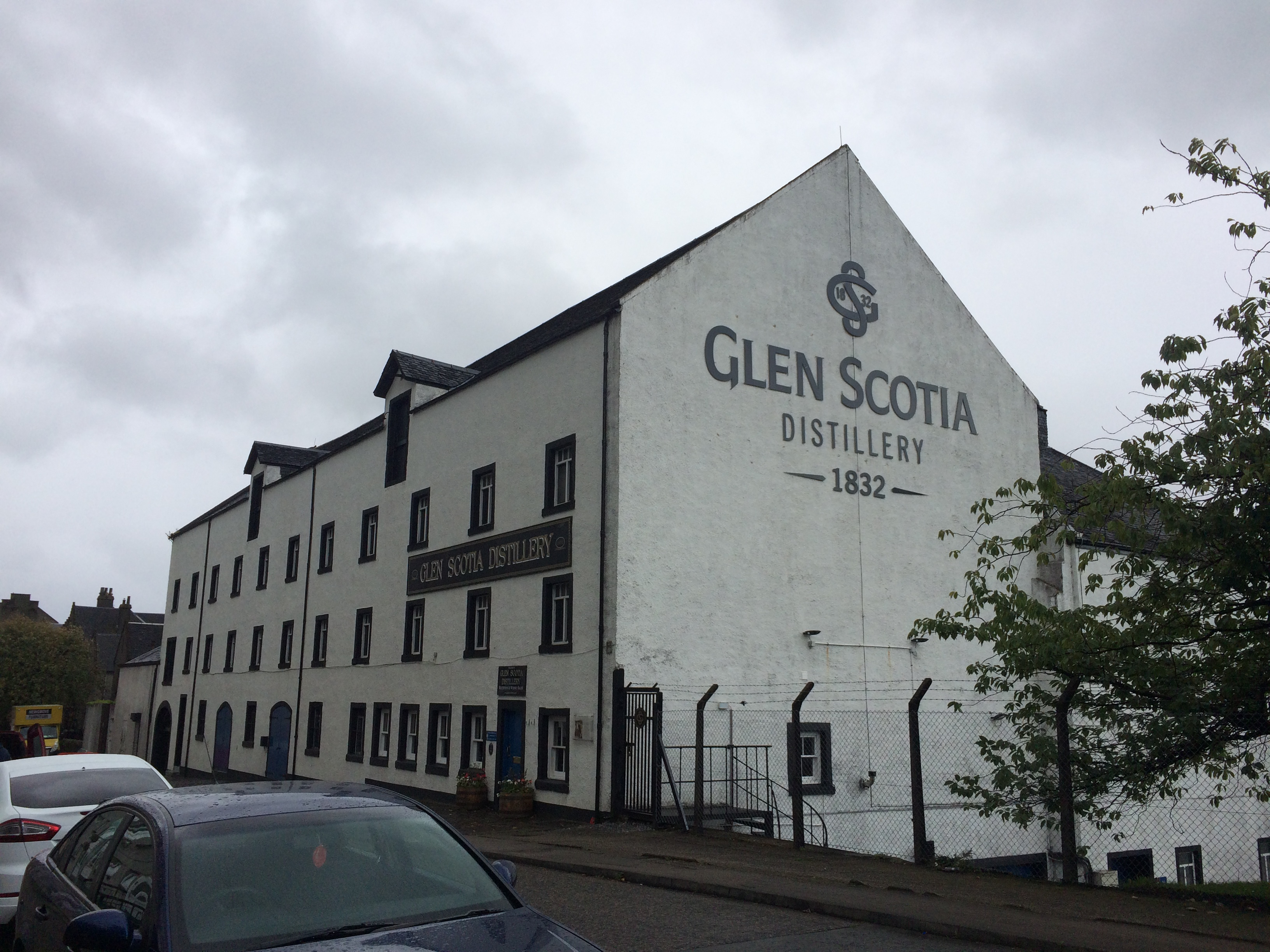
- Campbeltown Seafront Campbeltown Town Hall Campbeltown Harbour The Wee Picture House Glen Scotia distillery

- Location within Argyll and Bute
- Population: 4,425 (2022)
- OS grid reference: NR 71800 20300
  - Edinburgh: 101 mi (163 km)
  - London: 352 mi (566 km)
- Council area: Argyll and Bute
- Lieutenancy area: Argyll and Bute
- Country: Scotland
- Sovereign state: United Kingdom
- Post town: Campbeltown
- Postcode district: PA28
- Dialling code: 01586
- Police: Scotland
- Fire: Scottish
- Ambulance: Scottish
- UK Parliament: Argyll, Bute and South Lochaber
- Scottish Parliament: Argyll and Bute

Campbeltown (/ˈkæmbəltən/; Scottish Gaelic: Ceann Loch Chille Chiarain or Ceann Locha) is a town and former royal burgh in Argyll and Bute, Scotland. It lies by Campbeltown Loch on the Kintyre Peninsula. The population of Campbeltown was 4,425 in 2022, indicating a decrease since the 2011 census. Campbeltown is an important centre for Scotch whisky, and a busy fishing port.

== History ==
Originally known as Kinlochkilkerran (an anglicisation of the Gaelic, which means 'head of the loch by the kirk of Ciarán'), Campbeltown was renamed in the 17th century as Campbell's Town after Archibald Campbell (Earl of Argyll) was granted the site in 1667. Campbeltown Town Hall was completed in 1760.

The Royal National Lifeboat Institution opened Campbeltown Lifeboat Station in 1861. The present building dates from 1996.

=== Fishing ===
The Annual Reports of the Fishery Board for Scotland provide an insight into the state of fishing from Campbeltown and Machrihanish in the years before the First World War. The results below were accumulated for both places. In the report for 1898 we learn that "most of the herrings caught are sold at sea to buying steamers. All the herrings caught in Kilbrennan Sound are included in the Campbeltown returns". In the report for 1913 we learn that there was a "large increase in [the] quantity and value of herrings". The Kilbrennan Sound was still the location of the principal fishing grounds, but no mention is made of steamers.

Fishery Statistics

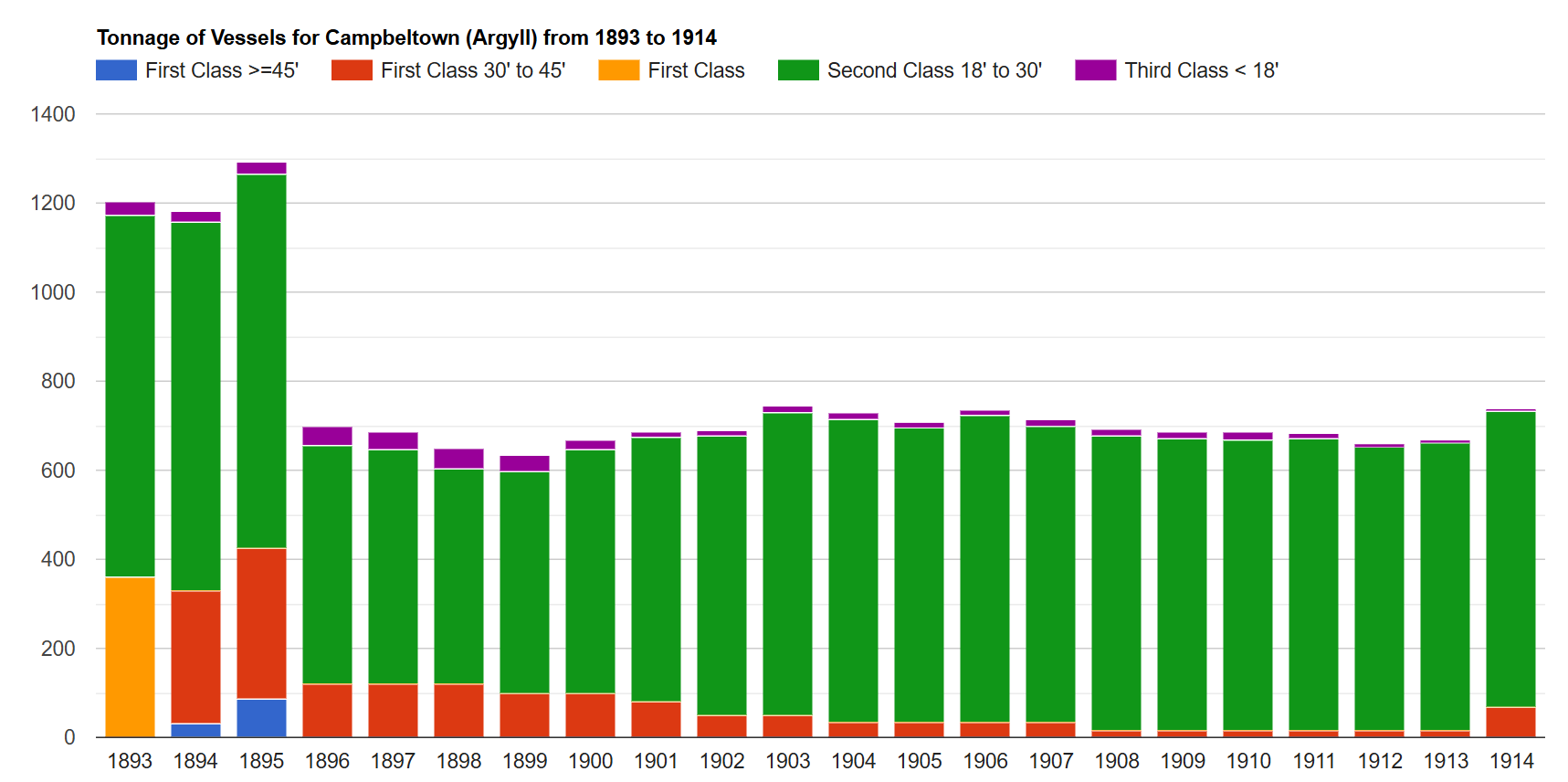
Tonnage of vessels

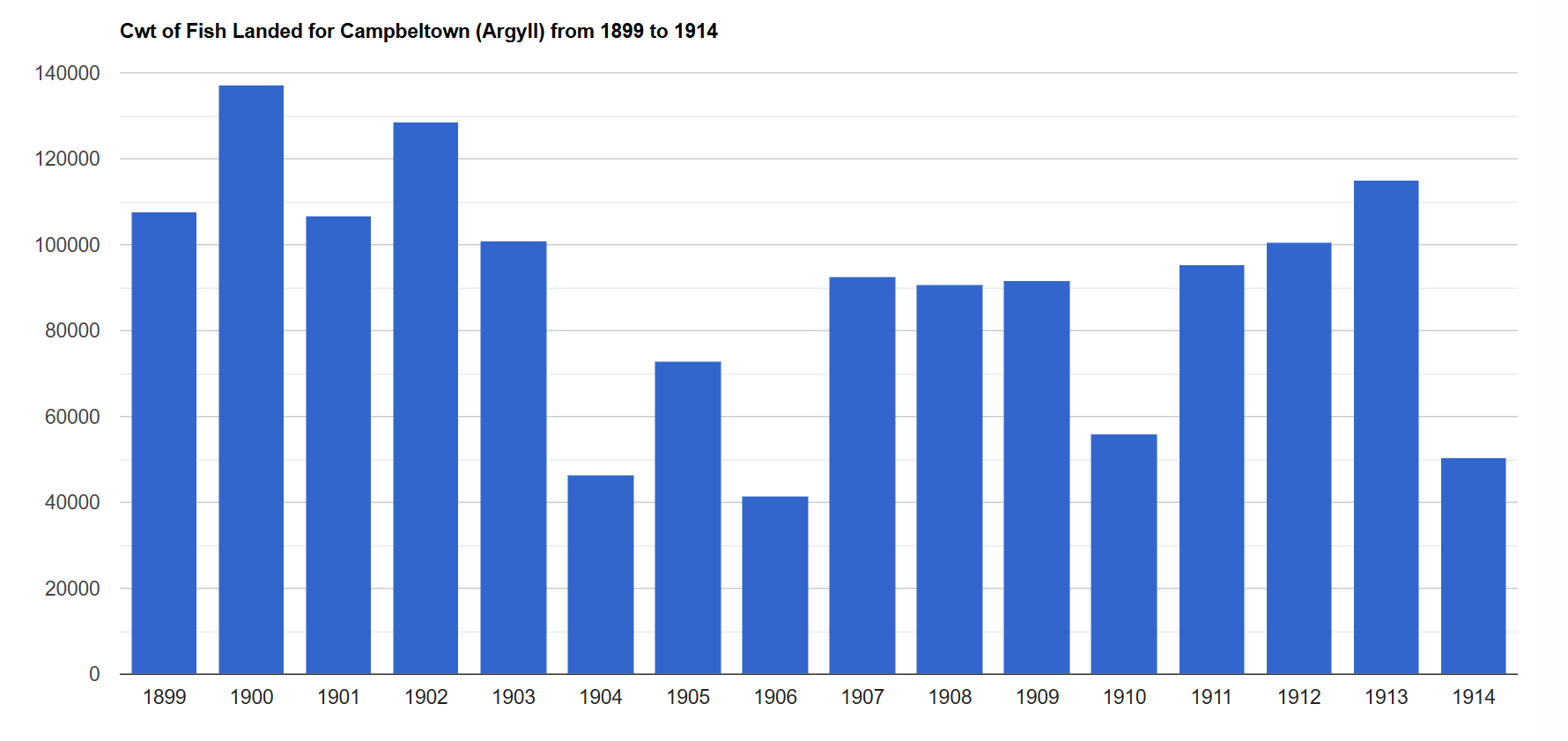
Cwt of fish landed

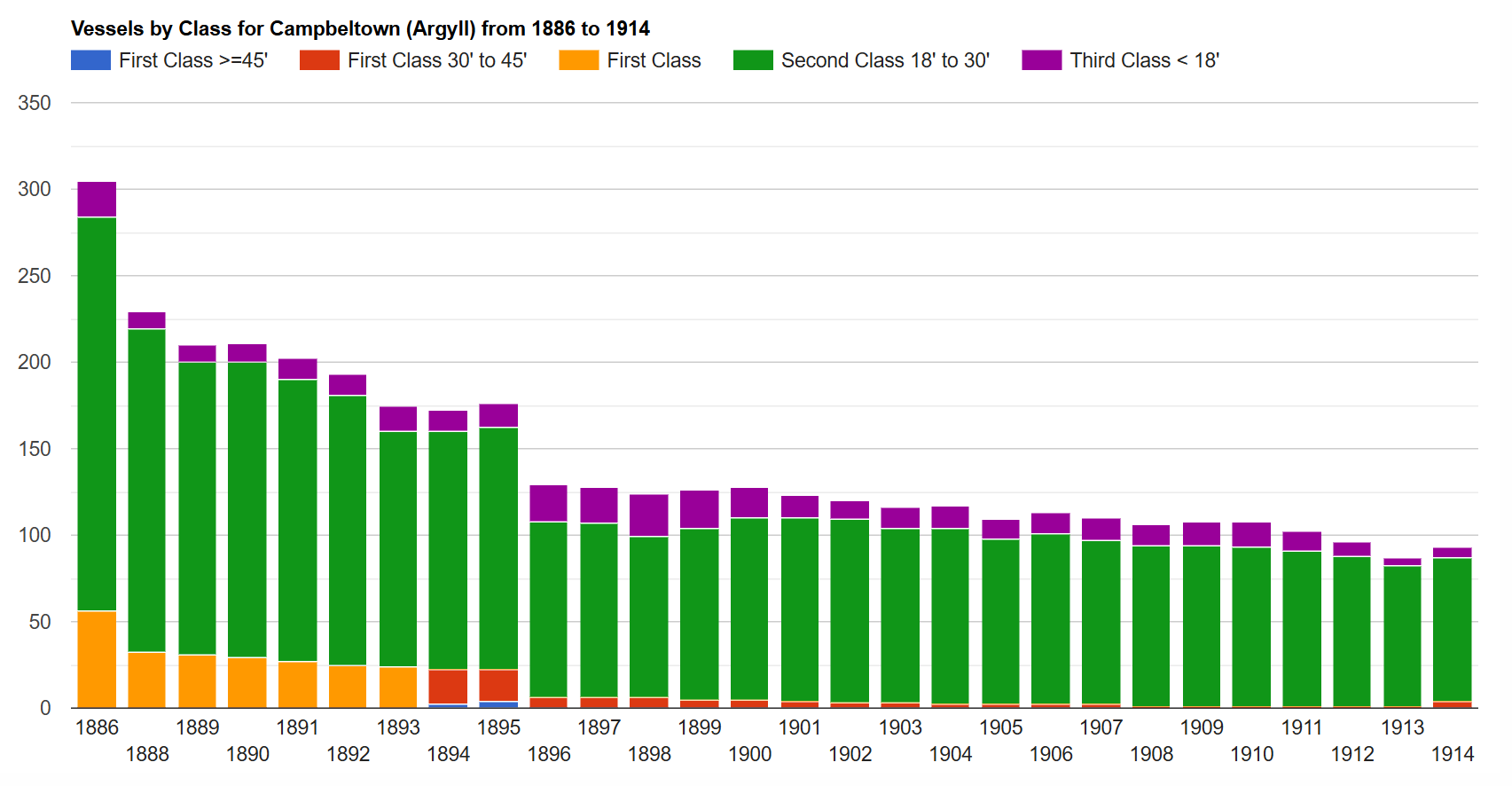
Vessels by class

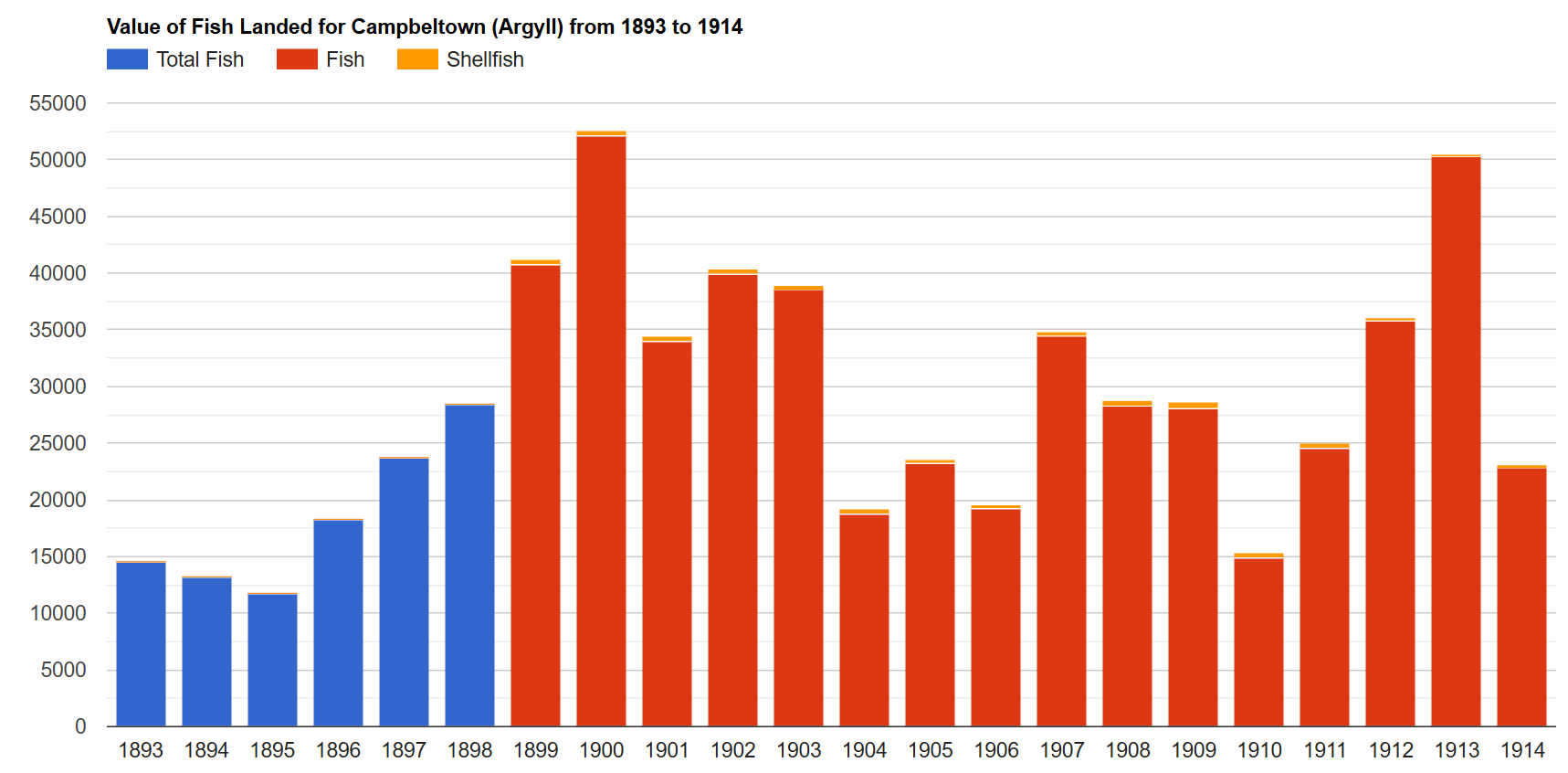
Value (£) of fish landed

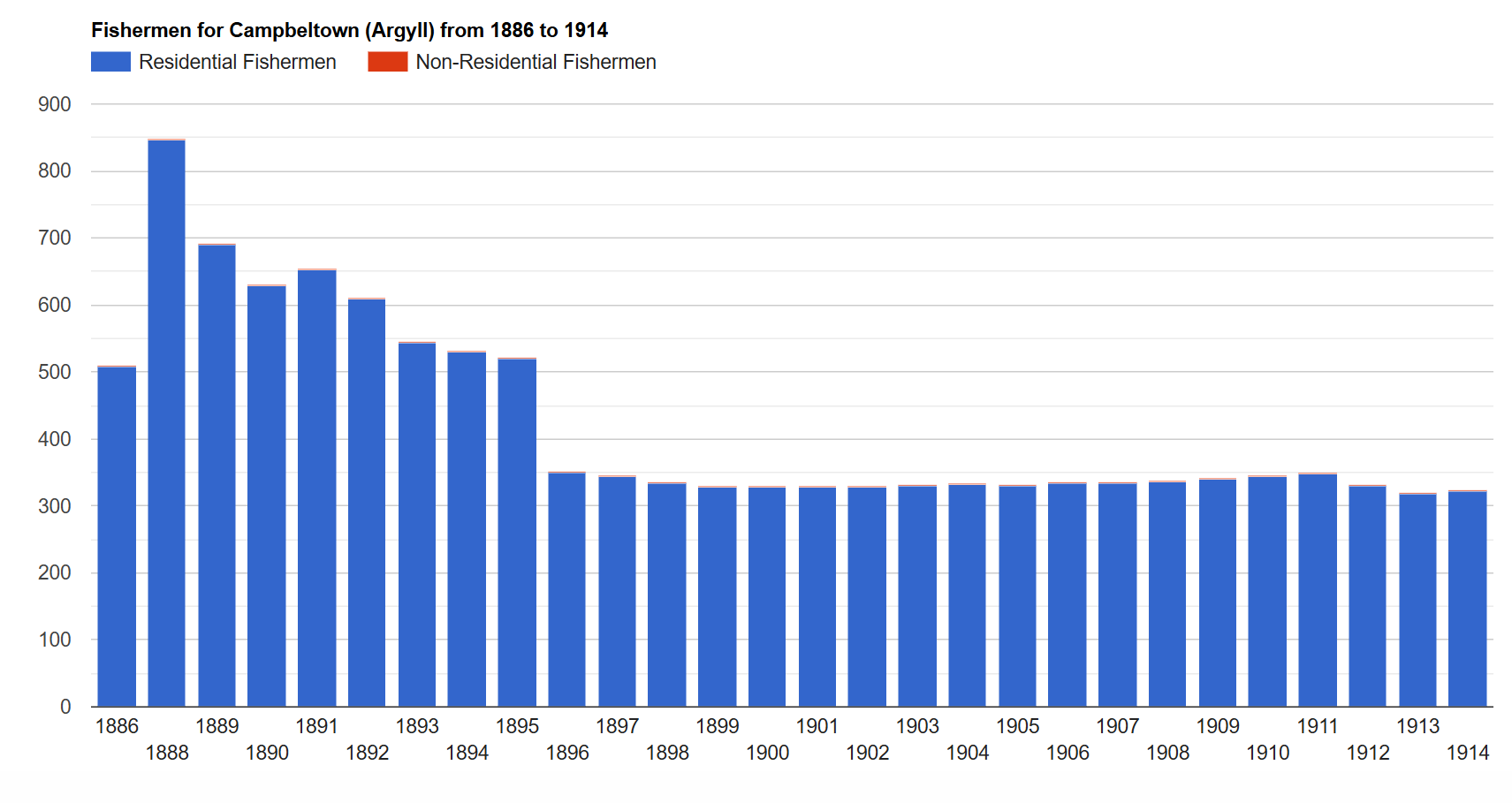
Fishermen

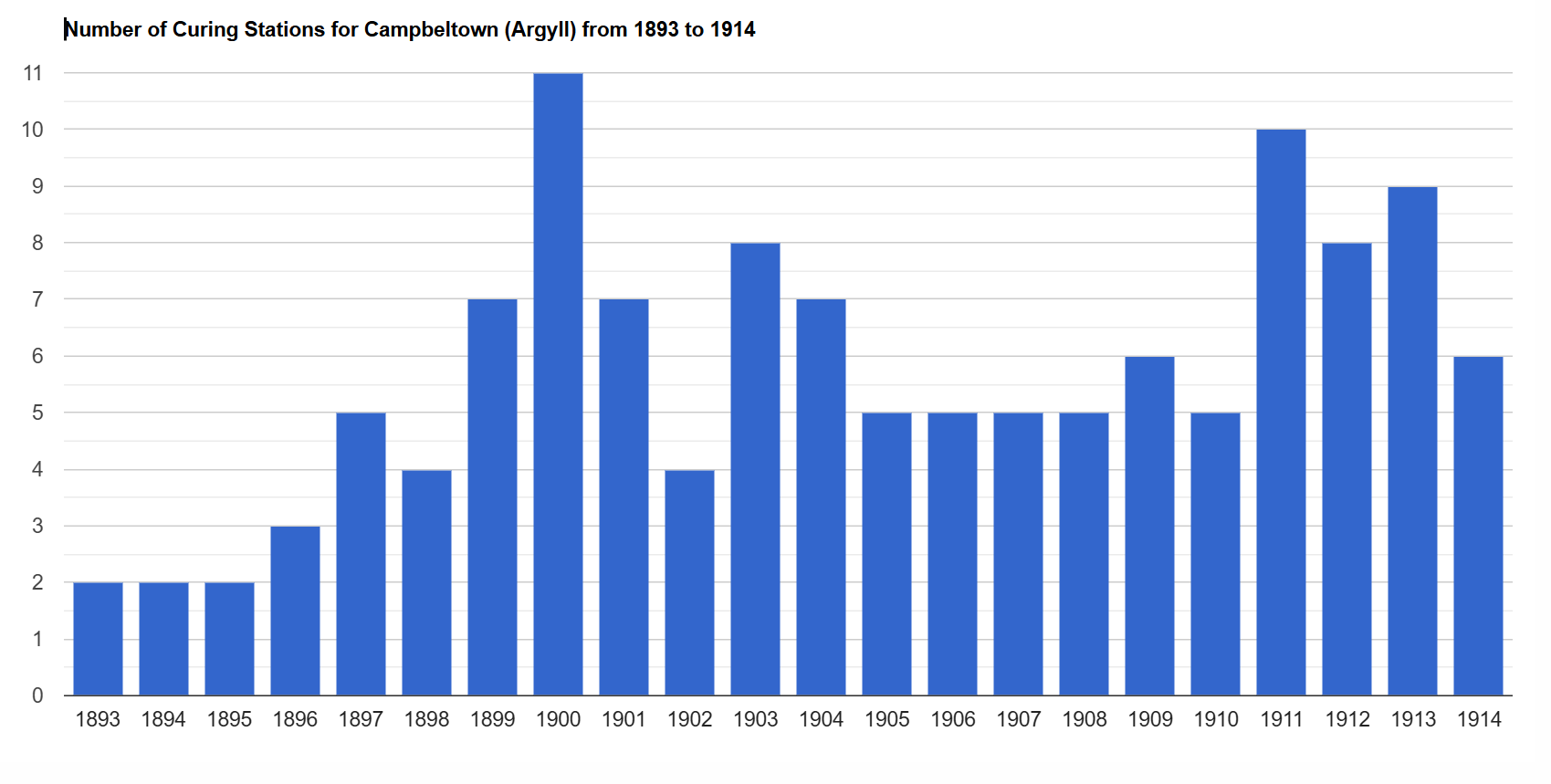
Number of curing stations

== Economy ==
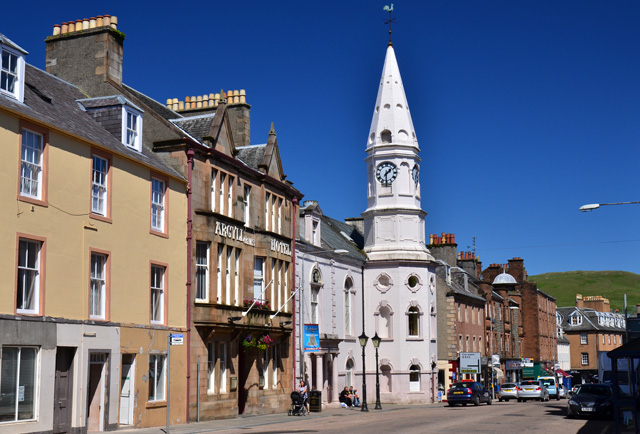
Main street, with Campbeltown Town Hall visible

In addition to the benefits of distilling, and whisky tourism, there were two major employers in 2018, Campbeltown Creamery and CS Wind UK, who provided "a substantial portion of the Campbeltown area’s high skilled jobs and are a vital part of the local economy," according to the Scottish government. A report in October 2019 had raised warning signs for the economy of Argyll & Bute; the report also suggested that up to 70 jobs at CS Wind UK could be lost but did not specify a timeframe.

Both companies confirmed the prediction of job redundancies, leading the Scottish government to hold an emergency summit in November 2019 to discuss steps that might be taken for improving the local economy. Participants included Argyll & Bute Council, Highlands & Islands Enterprise, trades unions and local employers. After the summit, a "working group" was formed in late November 2019.

The number of dairy farms supplying Campbeltown Creamery reduced from 147 to 28 and the number of dairy cows fell from 6600 to 2500. Consequently, the Creamery became unviable. A plan by a small number of local dairy farmers to take over the running of the Creamery failed in early December 2019. The milk produced in Kintyre is now transported by road tankers to Lockerbie and Mull of Kintyre Cheddar is no longer available.

By early December 2019, CS Wind UK had declared 22 jobs redundant. The Scottish government was working with the company to search for long-term solutions. Preliminary discussions did not produce optimism about the future stability of the company. The Unite union indicated that while CS Wind had been profitable, it was not receiving an adequate number of orders to sustain full employment. The plant was shut down in 2019 and production shifted to CS Wind's cheaper Vietnam plant in Phú Mỹ.

=== Whisky ===
Campbeltown is one of five areas in Scotland categorised as a distinct malt whisky producing region, and is home to the Campbeltown single malts. At one point it had over 30 distilleries and proclaimed itself "the whisky capital of the world". However, a focus on quantity rather than quality, and the combination of Prohibition and the Great Depression in the United States, led to most distilleries going out of business. Today only three active distilleries remain in Campbeltown: Glen Scotia, Glengyle, and Springbank.

Campbeltown is a "protected locality" for Scotch Whisky distilling under the UK's Scotch Whisky Regulations 2009.

The folk song titled "Campbeltown Loch, I wish you were whisky" is based on the town's history in this industry.

== Climate ==
As with the rest of Scotland, Campbeltown experiences a maritime climate with cool summers and mild winters. The nearest official Met Office weather station for which online records are available is at Campbeltown Airport/RAF Machrihanish, about 3 mi (4.8 km) west of the town centre.

The lowest temperature to be reported in recent years was −12.9 °C (8.8 °F) during December 2010.

Climate data for Campbeltown Airport, 10 m (33 ft) ASL, 1991–2020
Month	Jan	Feb	Mar	Apr	May	Jun	Jul	Aug	Sep	Oct	Nov	Dec	Year
Mean daily maximum °C (°F)	8.0 (46.4)	8.2 (46.8)	9.5 (49.1)	11.5 (52.7)	14.2 (57.6)	16.2 (61.2)	17.6 (63.7)	17.7 (63.9)	16.2 (61.2)	13.3 (55.9)	10.4 (50.7)	8.6 (47.5)	12.6 (54.7)
Mean daily minimum °C (°F)	2.9 (37.2)	2.7 (36.9)	3.4 (38.1)	4.7 (40.5)	6.9 (44.4)	9.6 (49.3)	11.3 (52.3)	11.4 (52.5)	10.1 (50.2)	7.6 (45.7)	5.1 (41.2)	3.1 (37.6)	6.6 (43.9)
Average rainfall mm (inches)	130.3 (5.13)	104.4 (4.11)	91.2 (3.59)	71.1 (2.80)	69.2 (2.72)	71.4 (2.81)	86.5 (3.41)	99.0 (3.90)	94.1 (3.70)	136.2 (5.36)	140.6 (5.54)	135.4 (5.33)	1,229.3 (48.40)
Average rainy days (≥ 0.1 mm)	18.8	15.7	14.7	12.4	12.6	12.0	14.0	14.8	14.9	17.3	18.8	18.0	184.0
Mean monthly sunshine hours	46.9	78.3	108.4	170.3	216.4	180.6	160.1	162.5	130.7	89.7	54.9	42.3	1,441.2
Source: Met Office

== Culture ==
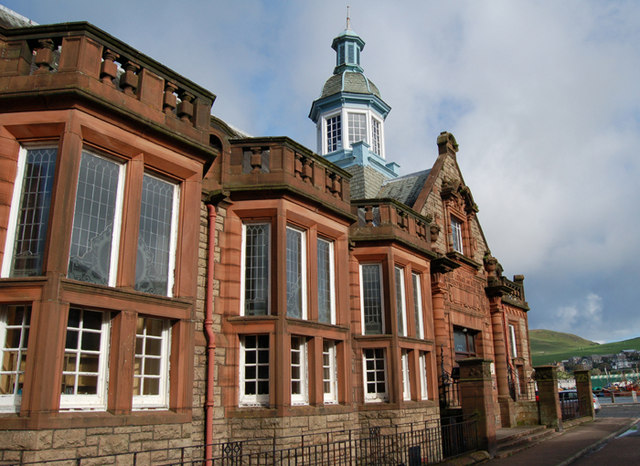
The old Library and Museum 1897-99

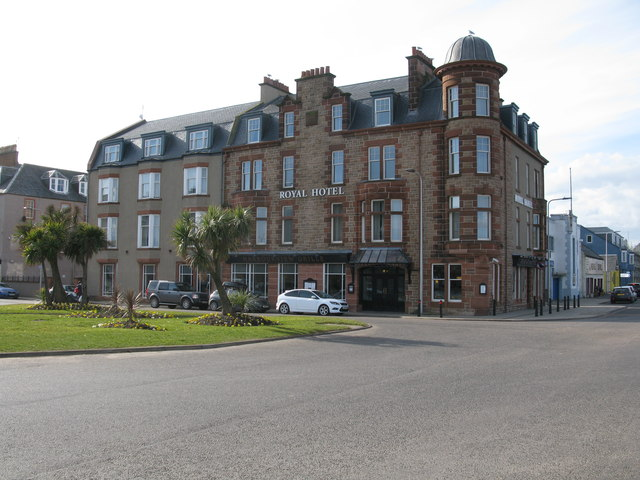
The Royal Hotel of 1907-08

Campbeltown boasts a museum and a heritage centre. The museum has a varied collection of items from Campbeltown's past, and prehistoric items excavated from sites around Kintyre, such as axeheads, jewellery and combs. The 19th-century building, by John James Burnet, also houses the Registrars office and Customer Service Point for Argyll and Bute council and has plaques or exhibits related to famous Kintyre people: for example, William McTaggart and William Mackinnon. Near the museum is the cinema known as the Wee Picture House, a small but distinctive Art Nouveau building of the Glasgow School dating from 1913 and believed to be the oldest surviving purpose-built cinema in Scotland. These buildings are on the waterfront, as is a 14th-century Celtic cross that also served as a mercat cross.

St Kieran (Ciarán of Clonmacnoise) lived in this area before the town existed. A cave named after him can be visited at low tide, as can the cave on nearby Island Davaar where pilgrims and tourists go to see a 19th-century crucifixion painting.

Campbeltown also hosts the annual Mull of Kintyre Music Festival, which has seen acts ranging from up-and-coming local bands to well-established groups such as Deacon Blue, The Stranglers and Idlewild perform.

The Kintyre Songwriters Festival, a fairly low-key annual gathering aimed at promoting the wealth and variety of original music across the area, which started in 2009. The festival is held during the last weekend of May and is open to anyone interested in performing.

On Friday 16 June 2006, First Minister Jack McConnell flew to Campbeltown to officially open Campbeltown's new 'Aqualibrium' Centre. Aqualibrium, designed by Page\Park Architects, replaced the old Campbeltown swimming pool, which was previously closed due to safety concerns; the centre houses Campbeltown's library (with the old building being the museum only), swimming pool, gym and conference centre.

The Kintyre Camanachd are a local shinty team that belongs to the Camanachd Association.

The local amateur football team, Campbeltown Pupils AFC, are members of the West of Scotland Football League Division 4 which largely comprises clubs based in the Greater Glasgow and Inverclyde areas, requiring the Campbeltown team to make a round trip of over 200 miles (320 km) for away fixtures most weekends.

Argyll FM is a local radio station based in Campbeltown on 106.5, 107.1 and 107.7.

In May 2012 Campbeltown and Dunoon were jointly named in a report by the Scottish Agricultural College as the rural places in Scotland most vulnerable to a downturn. The "vulnerability index" ranked 90 Scottish locations according to factors associated with economic and social change.

== Education ==
The town's secondary education is served by the Campeltown Grammar School. There are two primary schools the Castlehill Primary School and the Dalintober Primary School.

== Politics ==
Campbeltown is part of the Argyll, Bute and South Lochaber constituency for elections to the House of Commons of the United Kingdom.

== Infrastructure ==
=== Telecommunications ===
The West Highland Telegraph was extended to Campbeltown in 1865 when the Universal Private Telegraph Company opened a telegraph office.

The first telephone exchange was opened by the National Telephone Company in the early 1900s. It was modernised in 1939 with the introduction of direct dialling and went digital in 1991 following the upgrade of the Lochgilphead exchange.

=== Electricity ===
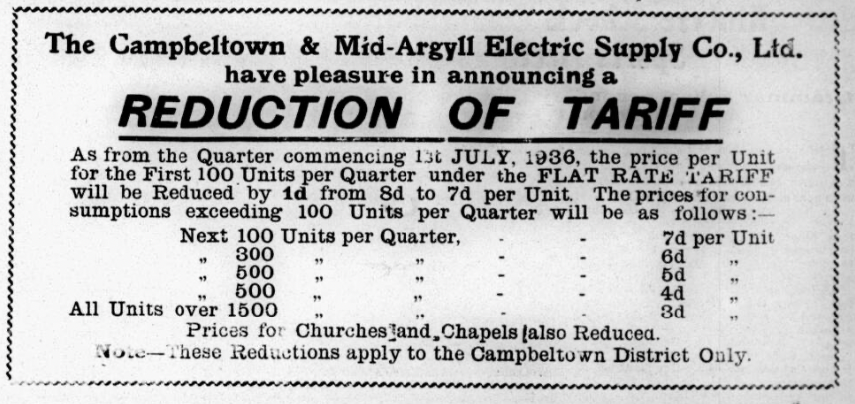
Reduction in tariffs from the Campbeltown Courier Saturday 27 June 1936

Electricity for domestic consumption arrived on 17 October 1935 when the Campbeltown and Mid Argyll Electric Power Company’s new power station in Glebe Street was inaugurated. The power station was built in the former premises of the Co-operative Society’s laundry. Two 150 h.p. oil fired engines drove the generators built by Ruston and Honsby. The street lighting in the town was converted from gas to electricity in 1936.

== Transport ==
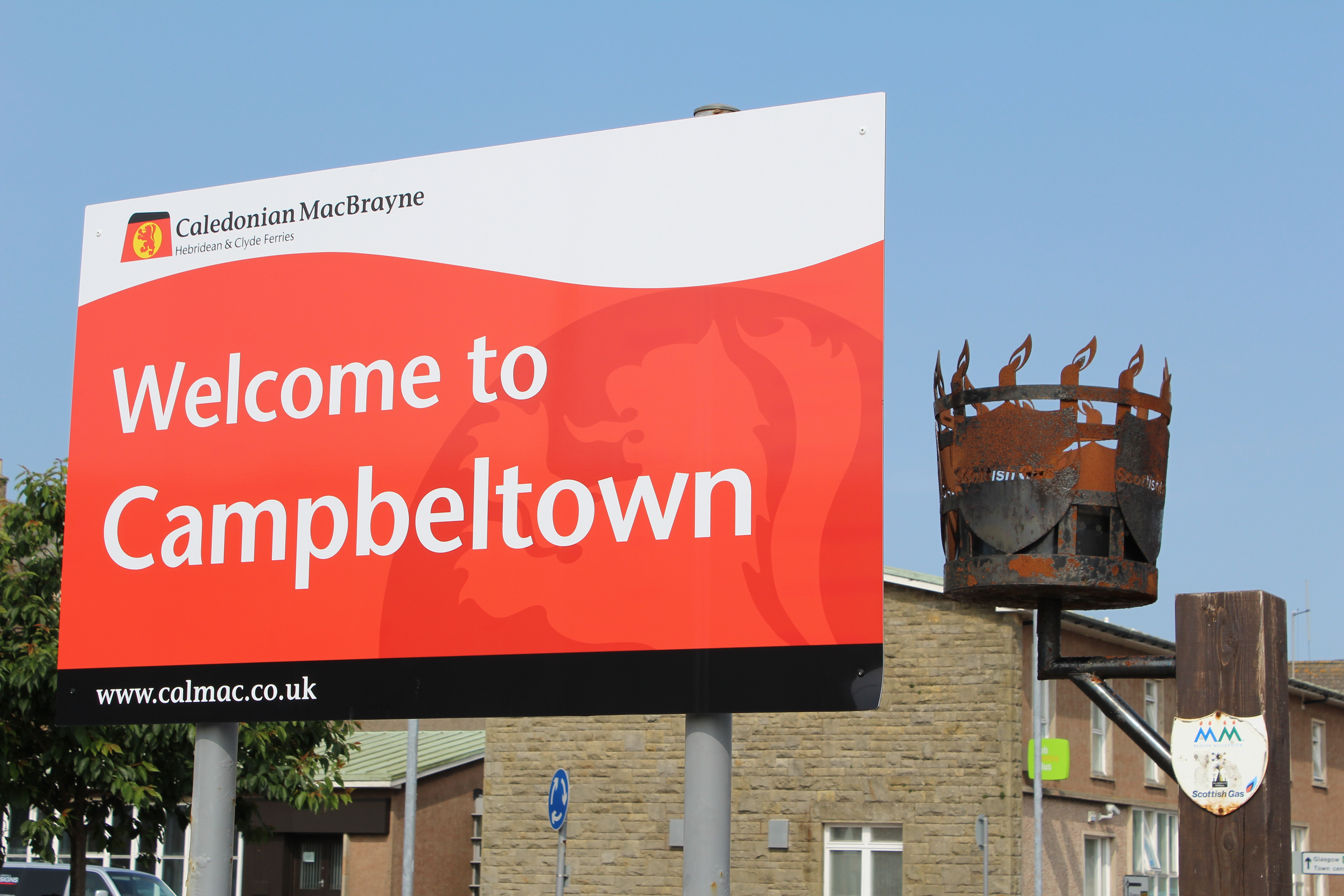
Campbeltown Ferry Terminal

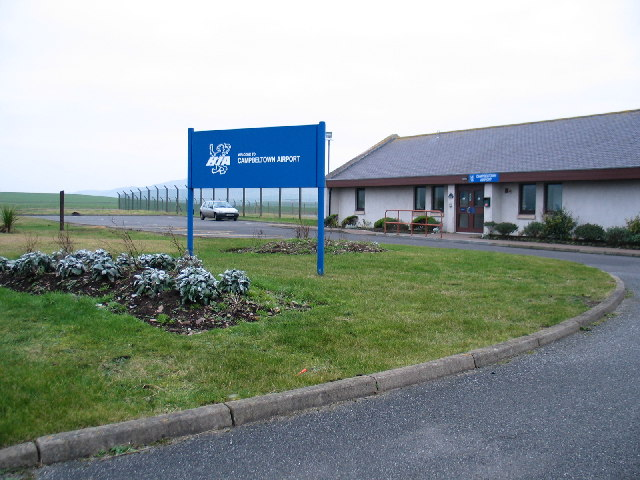
Campbeltown Airport terminal building

Campbeltown Airport is near the town, and has a scheduled service to/from Glasgow International Airport on weekdays and some summer Sundays.

The town is the westernmost town in the island of Great Britain (if the port of Mallaig is not counted as a town). It has the population of a large village, but lays claim to its town status based on its port and its central close grid of streets. Its position near the end of a long peninsula makes for a time-consuming road journey, and to some extent the area relies on sea and air transport, like the Inner Hebrides. However it is linked to the rest of Scotland by the A83 (to Tarbet) and A82 (from Tarbet to Glasgow). Bus service is provided by West Coast Motors, who also operate services to Glasgow for Scottish Citylink.

Ferries sail from Campbeltown to Ballycastle in Northern Ireland, operated by Kintyre Express. The service, which runs to Ballycastle every Friday to Monday during summer months and on Mondays and Fridays during the winter months, commenced in 2011.

In 2006 a foot passenger ferry operated by Kintyre Express ran between Campbeltown and Troon every Monday, Wednesday and Friday with a crossing time of one hour in calm weather. By 2007 this ferry no longer ran, although the vessel can be chartered privately.

Starting 23 May 2013, Caledonian MacBrayne began operating a ferry service across the Firth of Clyde to Ardrossan, calling at Brodick on Saturdays.

Campbeltown was linked to Machrihanish by a canal (1794 – mid-1880s) that was superseded by the Campbeltown and Machrihanish Light Railway, which closed in 1932. The railway, which was originally built to serve the Machrihanish Coalfield, ran from Campbeltown railway station to Machrihanish railway station.

Preceding station	Ferry	Following station
Terminus	Caledonian MacBrayne; Kintyre Ferry (Suspended for the summer 2025 season)	Ardrossan
Terminus	Caledonian MacBrayne; Kintyre Ferry (Suspended for the summer 2025 season)	Brodick
Terminus	Kintyre Express; Ferry	Ballycastle

== Language ==
Campbeltown is one of the few communities in the Scottish Highlands where the Scots language predominated in recent centuries, rather than the previously widespread Scottish Gaelic, an enclave of Lowland Scots speech surrounded by Highland Scottish speech.

== Notable people ==
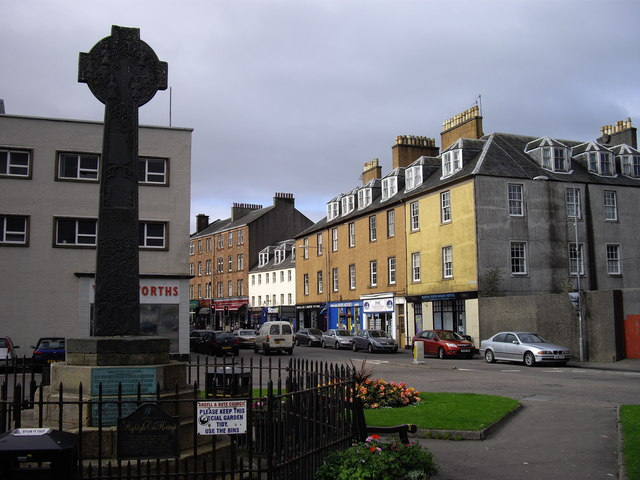
Main Street and Campbeltown Cross

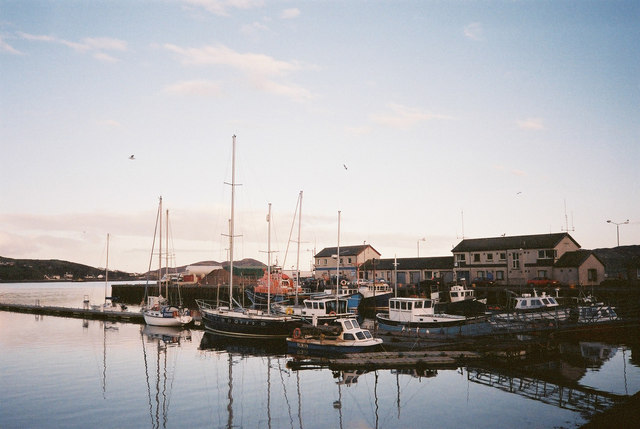
Campbeltown harbour

- Denzil Meyrick (1965–2025), author of Kinloch novels
- John Neil Munro, journalist and author of biographies
- Alexander Beith (1799–1891), minister and author in Gaelic and English. Free Church Moderator
- Hugh Henry Brackenridge (1748–1816), American writer, lawyer, judge, and justice of the Pennsylvania Supreme Court
- John Campbell Mitchell (1861–1922), landscape artist
- T. Lindsay Galloway (1854–1921), civil and mining engineer and coal master of Argyll Colliery
- James Gulliver (1930–1996), founder of Argyll Foods
- Sir William Mackinnon, 1st Baronet, Scottish ship-owner and businessman
- Norman Macleod (Caraid nan Gaidheal), Scottish divine and miscellaneous writer, served at the parish of Campbeltown, father of Norman Macleod (below)
- Norman Macleod, Scottish clergyman and author
- Angus MacVicar, author and broadcaster
- Neil McBain, professional footballer and football manager
- Paul McCartney, musician, singer, songwriter, ex-member of the Beatles and an ex-leader of Wings, owns a farm (named High Park) near the town
- Jill McGown, British writer of mystery novels
- Duncan McNab McEachran, Canadian veterinarian and academic
- Dan McPhail, professional footballer who made 437 appearances in the Football League
- William McTaggart, landscape artist
- George Pirie, artist who was associated with the Glasgow Boys in the 1880s
- Kieran Prendergast, diplomat and a former Under-Secretary-General for Political Affairs at the United Nations
- Bob Pursell, footballer who played for Liverpool F.C. in the early 20th century
- Peter Pursell, footballer, who won one cap for Scotland in 1914
- Very Rev James Curdie Russell, Moderator of the General Assembly of the Church of Scotland minister of Campbeltown
- David Smith (Rhodesian politician), Deputy Prime Minister of Rhodesia
- Angus Stewart, Lord Stewart, lawyer and Senator of the College of Justice, a judge of the Supreme Courts of Scotland
- John Stewart, Australian politician
- Gerald Tait, Olympic sailor
- Lawrence Tynes, placekicker in the National Football League. Grew up in Campbeltown when his father was with the US Navy
- George Wylie, member of the Wisconsin State Assembly and State Senate

== Town twinnings ==
Campbeltown is twinned with:

- Kümmersbruck, Bavaria, Germany.

== Gallery ==
Campbeltown
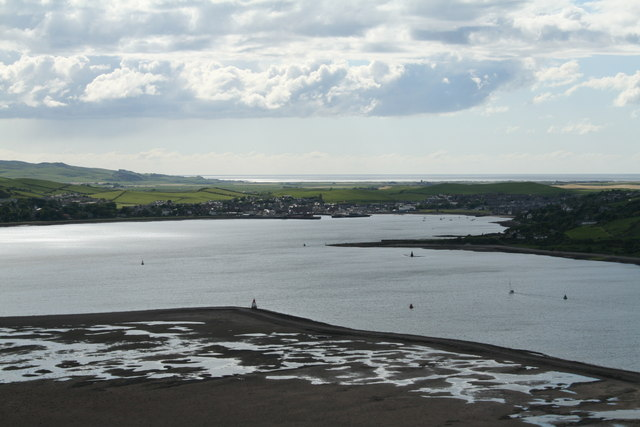
Campbeltown Loch and Campbeltown. Looking down from the top of Davaar. In the foreground is the Doirlinn, then the loch. On the western side of the loch is Campbeltown and beyond that Machrihanish Bay can be seen.

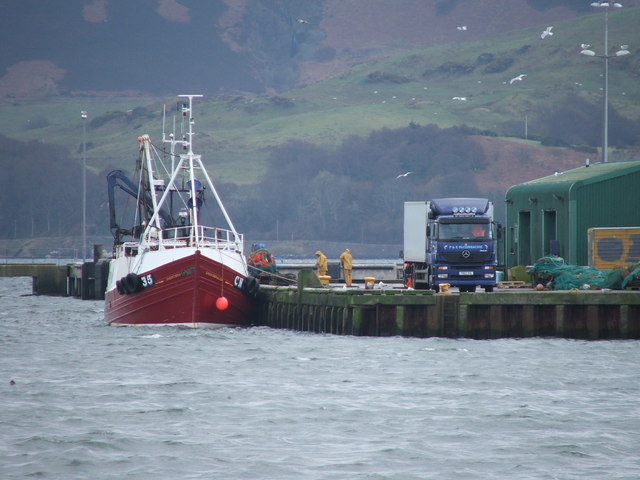
Unloading the catch at Campbeltown

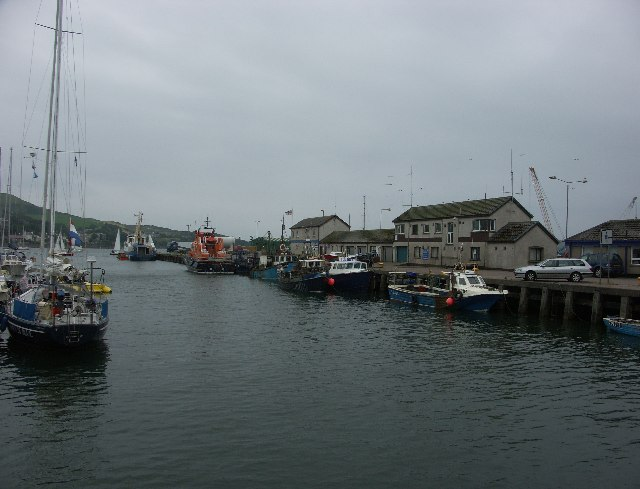
Campbeltown Pier

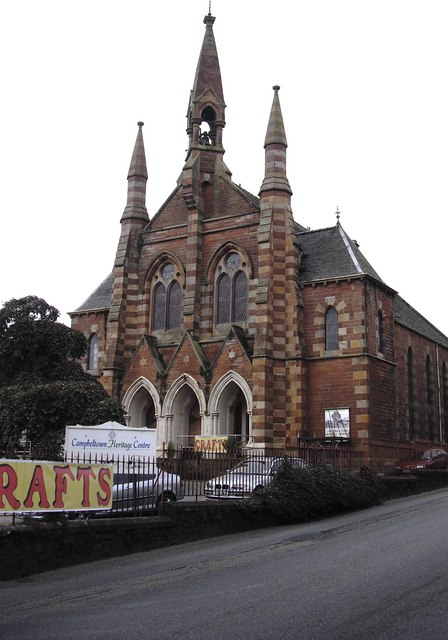
Campbeltown Heritage Centre

== See also ==
- Lochend Castle, Campbeltown
- Charles Campbell (member for Campbeltown)
- Christian Institute, Campbeltown
- Hazelburn distillery
- Highland Parish Church, Campbeltown
- Lorne & Lowland Parish Church
- Lorne Street Church, Campbeltown
- St Kiaran's Episcopal Church, Campbeltown
- St Kieran's R.C. Church, Campbeltown
- HMS Minona
