= Campbeltown Creamery =

Dairy and cheese maker

Coordinates: 55°25′21.5″N 5°36′42.3″W

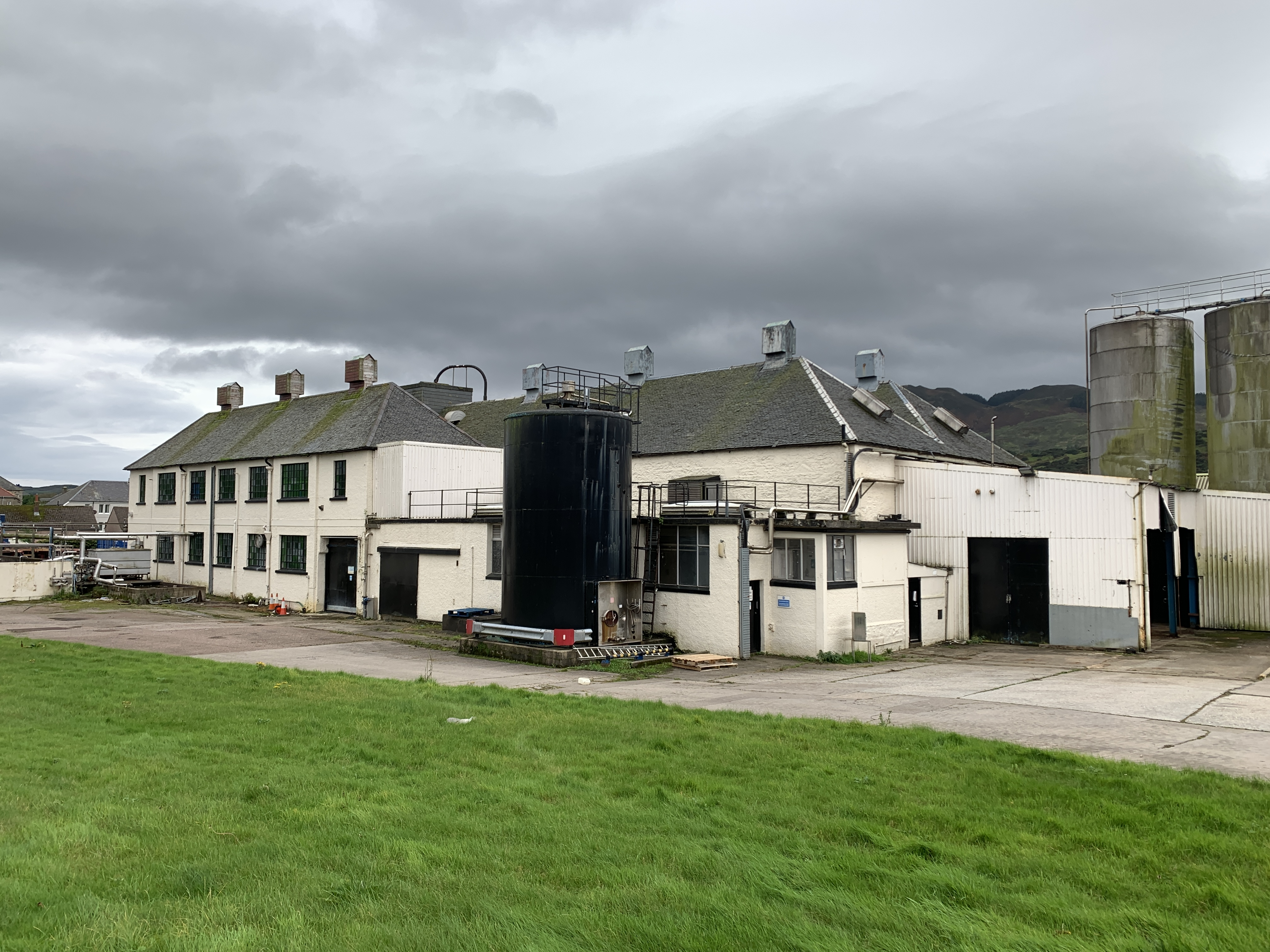
- The Creamery site in 2021
- Type: Limited company
- Industry: Dairy products
- Founded: 1 March 1920; 106 years ago in Campbeltown
- Defunct: 1 January 2017
- Fate: Closed
- Headquarters: Campbeltown, United Kingdom
- Products: Milk, condensed milk, cheese, butter

Campbeltown Creamery was a British dairy business based in Campbeltown, Argyll and Bute from 1920 to 2017.

== History ==
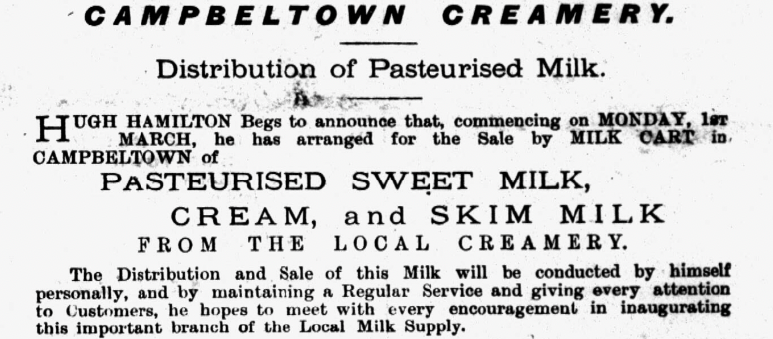
From the Campbeltown Courier - 21 February 1920

A creamery was first established on the site of Burnside Whisky distillery in 1919 by United Creameries Ltd to produce products such as cheese, condensed milk, butter and industrial casein from milk taken from farms in Kintyre. It opened for the reception of milk on 1 March 1920.

By 1935 the cheese manufactured at the dairy by local cheesemaker Alexander McSporran of Clochkeil, Campbeltown won awards at the Kilmarnock Produce Show. The business expanded in 1938 with the construction of an additional factory. In early 1939 additional improvements were approved in the Campbeltown Dean of Guild Court which included the construction of a laboratory, a canteen, a kitchen, a rest room, a room for drying clothes and four cheese stores.

In 1974 Unigate sold the creamery to Swannay Farm Cheese Ltd of Orkney, thus establishing The Campbeltown Creamery Ltd which began the production of Cheddar cheese. By 1982 the company was employing 40 people and making 3,000 tons of Cheddar cheese per year.

In 1985 the European Economic Community introduced the first milk quotas to manage an over supply of butter in Europe. The quotas for Kintyre were reduced by about 6% but by 1987 the Creamery was forced to buy in milk from outside of Kintyre to maintain production and was only operating at around 55% of capacity. At this time its products including Campbeltown Cheese and Scottish mature cheddar were being sold in Marks and Spencer, Sainsburys, Fine Fare, Safeway and St Ivel.

In 1990 Campbeltown Creamery Ltd was acquired by a joint venture between Scottish Pride, the Scottish Milk Marketing Board’s commercial division which took a two-thirds share and 3i Investment Company which took one-third. At this point annual production was 3,500 tonnes of Cheddar cheese and a turnover of £11m.

Scottish Pride went into receivership in 1997 when it was acquired by Scottish Milk Ltd and continued trading until 2017.
