= Kintyre Camanachd =

Kintyre
- Full name: Kintyre Camanachd Club
- Gaelic name: Comann Camanachd Chinn Tire
- Founded: 1985
- Ground: The Meadows Park, Campbeltown
- League: In Abeyance
Home

Kintyre Camanachd is a shinty team from Campbeltown, Kintyre, Scotland. It no longer holds membership of the Camanachd Association and has not fielded a senior side or a ladies' side for several years. However, it has youth teams which compete from time to time.

== History ==
Shinty was traditionally played, as in other Highland areas, at New Year. One game was notorious for being cancelled due to fighting and indeed a man was alleged to have committed murder at one game in the 1830s.

Kintyre was formed in 1985 and won the South Division Four Championship in 1992. The club also played a team from Islay for the Camanachd Ile Cup around the early 90s.

The club has had a history of abeyance, hampered by the remoteness of the Mull of Kintyre. The Under 17 side sometimes play in the South Area League. Some older players go to Kilmory Camanachd to play at a senior level.

Shinty is being kept alive in Kintyre by the ladies' team although they have not entered competition since 2009.

A campaign to get an all-weather park for Campbeltown appeared to have been a success with an announcement of funding by the Argyll & Bute Council in early 2011 and may help assist the club reach senior status again. The Camanachd Association was involved in youth development in 2011 and this will hopefully lead to a re-emergence of Kintyre in future.
