= History of Partick =

This article deals with the history of the Partick area of Glasgow in Scotland.

== Etymology of Partick ==
The place name Partick is derived from the Cumbric word for 'thicket'. This etymology reflects the fact that the inhabitants of the Glasgow/Strathclyde region were speakers of this Old Welsh dialect. Gaelic only became of predominant in this area with the waning and disappearance of the British Kingdom of Alt Clut/Strathclyde, perhaps in the eleventh century.

== Dark Ages Royal centre ==
There is some evidence that Partick was an important centre for the Kings of Alt Clut/Strathclyde. According to the Cistercian monk and hagiographer of St Kentigern, Jocelin of Furness, King Rhydderch had a residence in 'Pertnech' (Partick). Some archaeologists have deduced that the royal Partick estate was part of a larger elite centre of the kingdom, which included the ecclesiastical establishment just across the River Clyde at Govan. Partick and Govan may have come to prominence as a political centre following the Vikings' sack of Dumbarton in 870. The lands of Partick remained royal property until King David granted them to the Bishops of Glasgow on the cathedral's dedication to Saint Kentigern, along with the lands of Govan.

== Bishop's Residence ==
Coat of arms of the Burgh of Partick, showing the castle and mitre of the Bishop of Glasgow

From the time of King David's grant of land to the Bishops of Glasgow, the country residence of the Bishops was situated in Partick. This is supported by the existence of a deed of 1277 in which Maurice, Lord of Luss made a contract at Perthec for the sale of timber to the authorities at Glasgow Cathedral.

The Bishops' residence is depicted on the former Burgh of Partick's coat of arms as a castle. In 1362, a settlement of a dispute between the Bishop and his chapter house was made at his manor-house of Perthic. Glasgow's Bishops continued to use their residence in Partick until the reformation in 1560, when Bishop James Beaton II fled to France from there, taking with him the sacred relics from Glasgow Cathedral.

== The Reformation and after ==
After the reformation in 1560, ownership of the lands returned to the Scottish Crown. From that time on to the nineteenth century, Partick was part of Govan parish and therefore in Renfrewshire. The boundary between Glasgow and Partick was the River Kelvin (but with a small area over the river at Pointhouse also in Partick).

Partick was the main crossing point of the River Kelvin for the road between Glasgow and Dumbarton. From earliest times, the river was crossed by a ford. Later came a wooden bridge for foot passengers. It is commonly thought that the first permanent stone bridge over the river was built by Captain Thomas Crawford of Jordanhill, who was Provost of Glasgow at the start of the seventeenth century.

The building known as Partick Castle lay close to Partick's original ford. It was built by the Glasgow benefactor, George Hutcheson, and was derelict by the late eighteenth century.

== Milling Centre ==
Partick remained a relatively small village until the early nineteenth century. The steep drop of the River Kelvin between what is now Glasgow's Botanic Gardens and the river's mouth, led to Partick becoming an important centre of milling, especially grain milling. While Glasgow's Molendinar Burn powered a few mills during the medieval period, its flow was insufficient for the needs of the growing burgh, perhaps as early as the twelfth century. So the city came to depend on the rapidly flowing River Kelvin for its milling as well as two other locations: Bedlay (Cadder) and Clydesmill (Carmyle).

Records of Partick as a milling centre go back to the Middle Ages. A prophecy of Thomas the Rhymer (thirteenth century) predicts:

'you may walk across the Clyde on men's bodies, and the miller of Partick Mill (muileann Pearraig), who is to be a man with seven fingers will grind for two hours with blood instead of water.'

Before the reformation, the inhabitants of Glasgow used to grind their grain at either the Town Mill of Partick or at a nearby small mill belonging to Glasgow's Archbishop.

By 1820, Partick was a major milling centre, with several located in its vicinity. These included: the Old Mill (on the site of the building now known as the Bishop's Mill), the Slit Mill, the Archbishop's Mill (later Bunhouse/Regent Mill), the Waulk Mill (now Scotstoun Mill) and the Wee Mill. A little way upstream of Partick, there was also Clayslaps Mill (just below what is now Kelvingrove Museum & Art Gallery). Such a concentration of mills eventually resulted in the Clyde Navigation Trust building its colossal granaries at Meadowside in Partick in 1911–1913 (with subsequent extensions in 1936, 1960 and 1967). These were demolished in 2004 to make way for the Glasgow Harbour residential development

Of Partick's mills, Scotstoun Mill in Dunaskin Street, owned by Rank Hovis MacDougall, was the last to remain in operation. It closed in 2013.

== Nineteenth Century Development ==
During the nineteenth century Partick developed from a small village into a relatively populous centre as a result of the fast pace of industrial development along the River Clyde and improving communications. The table below summarises the population of the Burgh of Partick during the nineteenth century:

| Year | Population |
|---|---|
| 1820 | 1,235 |
| 1834 | 1,842 |
| 1841 | 3,184 |
| 1851 | 5,043 |
| 1861 | 10,917 |
| 1871 | 17,707 |
| 1881 | 27,410 |
| 1891 | 36,538 |
| 1901 | 54,274 |
| 1911 | 66,848 |

The development of the Clydeside ship building industry, in particular, gave momentum to Partick's rapid expansion. This in turn was made possible by the steady canalisation of the River Clyde between 1773 and the 1830s, which deepened and narrowed the river, to make it navigable by large ships. Canalisation also created 'firmer' banks along great stretches of the River Clyde, enhancing the prospect of their industrial development. In 1844 Messrs David Tod & John McGregor moved their shipbuilding operation from Govan to Partick. In 1858 a major step for their enterprise, was the opening of a new graving dock at their Meadowside site. Subsequently, several other shipyards opened along the north bank of the Clyde, including one directly across the mouth of the River Kelvin at Pointhouse (in 1845). Further west along the River Clyde, Barclay Curle's shipyard opened in 1855, precipitating the rapid development of the Whiteinch area. This was followed by the opening of Connell's shipyard (1861) and the Yarrow shipyard (1906) both yet further west in Scotstoun.

The transport of people and goods along the north bank of the River Clyde (between residential and industrial areas) was facilitated by the construction of the Lanarkshire and Dunbartonshire Railway, which opened in stages between 1894 and 1896.

== A Police Burgh ==
The Police of Towns (Scotland) Act, 1850 (Lock's Act) made it easier for Police Burghs to be created. Any "populous place" from this time on was able to adopt a police system and become a burgh.

The pressures caused by Partick's very rapid demographic and industrial expansion proved to be too much for the village's mid-nineteenth century infrastructure. In June 1852, at a public meeting, the householders of Partick agreed to constitute themselves into a Police Burgh to remedy a range of common concerns including:

...the defective state of the drainage, the disrepair of the streets and roads, the number and increase of nuisances in the locality, and the inability of the inhabitants to either to compel a proper and efficient system of drainage or to control or abate any nuisance, or to make any sanitary or other regulations for the well being of the community...

Twelve householders were elected as Commissioners. From among them, the shipbuilder David Tod was elected Partick's first Provost. According to the contemporary local historian, James Napier, these Commissioners (including himself) acted immediately:

The Commissioners now began to carry out a system of drainage and other sanitary measure with considerable promptitude, and, as the following facts show to great advantage. The first three years after 1854, the average death rate was 34.5 per 1000 of the population; the average of the last three years (he was writing in 1875), including 1872, is 21 per 1000 of the population, showing a saving of many hundred of lives to the community.

By 1853, the Commissioners had built a small administrative building for the burgh in a palazzo style. This eventually became Partick's police building which can still seen in Anderson Street (though Partick's Police Station has now been moved to the Thornwood stretch of Dumbarton Road). In 1872, the larger Partick Burgh Hall was built (in a Francois I style) to a design by William Leiper.

In 1912, the Burgh of Partick ceased to exist having been incorporated into the ever-expanding Glasgow Corporation. A contemporary account relates:

While the Burgh Organist played "Lochaber no More", the Provost's chain of office was removed from his neck, and as his robe was laid aside the Provost said, "There they lie, the abandoned habits of the Provost of Partick, taken from him by Act of Parliament."

== List of Provosts of Partick ==
- 1852–1857 David Tod
- 1857–1860 John White
- 1860–1863 Robert Robinson
- 1863–1869 Allan Arthur
- 1869–1872 Robert Hunter
- 1872–1875 George Thomson
- 1875–1878 John Ferguson
- 1878–1883 Hugh Kennedy
- 1883–1891 Andrew Maclean
- 1891–1898 James Caird
- 1898–1902 Alexander Wood
- 1902–1905 William Kennedy
- 1905–1908 John White
- 1908–1911 Thomas Logan
- 1911–1912 Thomas Stark Brown

Partick's last Provost was born in Markinch, Fife on 8 January 1855 to Robert Brown and Mary Stark; the 4th of 7 children.
