= List of listed buildings in Glasgow/6 =

This is a list of listed buildings in Glasgow, Scotland.

== List ==
Name	Location	Date listed	Geo-coordinates	Notes	Category	LB number	Image
6 Spencer Street, Temple Primary School With Boundary Walls, Gates And Railings			55°53′41″N 4°19′32″W		C(S)	43039	Upload another image See more images
147-149 (Odd Nos) Newlands Road, Weir Pumps Ltd Cathcart Works, Offices And Amenity Building			55°49′06″N 4°15′57″W		B	33947	Upload Photo
1110 Pollokshaws Road, 4 Moss-Side Road, TSB Bank			55°49′51″N 4°16′51″W		B	33955	Upload Photo
Pollokshaws Road, Pollockshaws West Station Including Embankment Wall To Street			55°49′26″N 4°18′06″W		B	33959	Upload another image
Shawhill Road, War Memorial At St Mary Immaculate RC Church			55°49′33″N 4°17′33″W		B	33966	Upload another image
1, 13 Circus Drive, Golfhill Public School Including Janitor's Lodge, Gates And Railings			55°51′45″N 4°13′34″W		B	33892	Upload Photo
116-120A (Even Nos) Duke Street, And 214 Hunter Street			55°51′33″N 4°13′56″W		C(S)	33898	Upload Photo
288-294 (Even Nos) Duke Street, 98-106 (Even Nos) Bellgrove Street			55°51′29″N 4°13′27″W		B	33900	Upload Photo
300 Barrhead Road, Lodge And Gateway To Pollock House			55°49′21″N 4°19′07″W		B	33916	Upload Photo
83 Langside Drive, The Beeches Including Gatepiers			55°48′43″N 4°16′43″W		B	33933	Upload Photo
217 London Road 18, 20 Stevenson Street, St Alphonsus RC Church And Presbytery			55°51′15″N 4°14′15″W		B	33852	Upload Photo
62 Templeton Street, Templeton Carpet Factory			55°51′01″N 4°13′58″W		A	33857	Upload another image
9, 11, 13 Watson Street, 31 Gallowgate			55°51′24″N 4°14′34″W		B	33861	Upload Photo
105-169 (Odd Nos) Bell Street			55°51′27″N 4°14′31″W		A	33814	Upload Photo
174 Bell Street			55°51′25″N 4°14′27″W		B	33817	Upload Photo
40-42 (Even Nos) Bridgeton Cross And 3 Landressy Street			55°50′57″N 4°13′39″W		B	33821	Upload Photo
2 Claythorn Street (Formerly 374, 378 Gallowgate)			55°51′20″N 4°13′59″W		B	33824	Upload Photo
231 Dalmarnock Road, Bridgeton Free Church And Hall			55°50′42″N 4°13′11″W		B	33825	Upload Photo
447-451 (Odd Nos) Gallowgate And 4 Graham Square			55°51′20″N 4°13′39″W		C(S)	33833	Upload Photo
4 Florence Street/ Glasgow Green, Weir And Pipe Bridge			55°51′07″N 4°14′45″W		B	33835	Upload another image
1, 1A Glasgow Green, People's Palace Museum And Winter Garden			55°51′04″N 4°14′15″W		A	33838	Upload another image
2-40 (Even Nos) Clarendon Place/ Maryhill Road And 281-297 (Odd Nos) St George's Road, Including Bank Of Scotland			55°52′17″N 4°16′04″W		B	33755	Upload another image
292-316 (Even Nos) Maryhill Road, Community Centre And Shops			55°52′35″N 4°16′15″W		C(S)	33774	Upload another image
61 Jessie Street, Sentinel Works			55°50′07″N 4°14′32″W		A	33693	Upload Photo
192 Mcneil Street, Hutcheson Town Public Library (Now Day Nursery)			55°50′46″N 4°14′32″W		B	33696	Upload Photo
110 Polmadie Road, St Margaret's Polmadie Church, Halls And Manse			55°50′20″N 4°14′22″W		B	33698	Upload Photo
115 Carmunnock Road, Cathcart Old Parish Manse			55°49′06″N 4°15′17″W		B	33706	Upload Photo
325 Carmunnock Road, King's Park, Aikenhead House, Sundial			55°48′49″N 4°14′27″W		B	33712	Upload Photo
114 Crofthill Road, Croftpark Avenue, Croftfoot School			55°48′54″N 4°14′02″W		C(S)	33713	Upload Photo
Snuffmill Road, Cathcart Old Bridge			55°48′49″N 4°15′33″W		B	33722	Upload Photo
694 Balmore Road, St Agnes Church (Roman Catholic) With Gatepiers, Boundary Walls And Railings			55°53′45″N 4°15′49″W		B	33738	Upload Photo
127 Allander Street, Possilpark Library			55°52′56″N 4°15′17″W		B	33741	Upload Photo
445 Balmore Road, Former Possil Goods Shed			55°53′30″N 4°15′37″W		C(S)	33743	Upload Photo
85, 111 Killin Street, Shettleston Old Parish Church And Hall, Boundary Wall And Railings			55°51′00″N 4°09′33″W		B	33637	Upload Photo
6-10 (Inclusive), 20-24 (Inclusive) And 30-43 (Inclusive) Parklands View, Former Leverndale Hospital, Kelburne Unit			55°49′59″N 4°22′01″W		B	33596	Upload Photo
179 Ayr Street Springburn Library And Museum			55°52′54″N 4°13′53″W		B	33610	Upload Photo
Midwharf Street And North Canalbank Street, Forth And Clyde Canal, Bascule Bridge Including Stone Platforms/Abutments			55°52′20″N 4°15′04″W		B	33617	Upload Photo
4-38 (Even Nos) Speirs Wharf			55°52′20″N 4°15′27″W		B	33619	Upload Photo
122 Helenvale Street, Calton Parkhead Church Including Hall, Boundary Wall, Gates And Railings			55°51′01″N 4°12′59″W		B	33636	Upload Photo
2-20 (Even Nos) Paisley Road West And Return Elevation To Govan Road			55°51′14″N 4°16′47″W		B	33526	Upload Photo
100 Govan Road, Glasgow Harbour Tunnel, Otherwise Known As Finnieston Tunnel Shaft And Rotunda			55°51′23″N 4°17′06″W		B	33528	Upload another image
140 Salkeld Street And Return Elevation To Mauchline Street, Former Garage Now Strathclyde Police Mounted And Dog Branch			55°50′52″N 4°15′43″W		B	33531	Upload Photo
173 Scotland Street, Former Subway Power Station			55°50′57″N 4°16′18″W		B	33532	Upload Photo
1121 Paisley Road West, Palace Of Art			55°50′51″N 4°19′06″W		B	33579	Upload another image
494-8 (Even Nos) Paisley Road West			55°51′04″N 4°18′03″W		B	33580	Upload Photo
Crookston Castle, 170 Brockburn Road			55°50′06″N 4°21′21″W		A	33586	Upload Photo
100 St Andrews Drive, Haggs Castle, Including Outbuilding			55°50′11″N 4°17′45″W		B	33467	Upload Photo
35 Sherbrooke Avenue And 103 Springkell Avenue, Patrick House, Including Boundary Walls And Gatepiers			55°50′21″N 4°17′55″W		B	33473	Upload Photo
85 Adelphi Street And 5 Florence Street, Glasgow College Of Building & Printing Annexe (Former Adelphi Terrace Public School), Including Gatepiers And Railings			55°51′05″N 4°14′48″W		B	33491	Upload another image
36-54 (Even Nos) Bridge Street, Former Bridge Street Station			55°51′12″N 4°15′33″W		B	33496	Upload another image
1 Caledonia Road, Former Caledonia Road UP Church			55°50′50″N 4°15′17″W		A	33497	Upload another image
27-117 (Odd Nos) Cook Street (Westbridge Gardens) And 181 And 183 West Street, Former Eglinton Engine Works			55°51′03″N 4°15′54″W		A	33504	Upload Photo
119 Gorbals Street Citizens Theatre			55°51′03″N 4°15′11″W		B	33512	Upload another image See more images
73 Milnpark Street, Kinning Park Colour Works			55°51′06″N 4°16′57″W		B	33518	Upload Photo
187-203 (Odd Nos) Old Rutherglen Road			55°50′57″N 4°14′49″W		B	33521	Upload Photo
50, 52 Glencairn Drive, Including Boundary Walls And Gatepiers			55°50′21″N 4°16′58″W		B	33409	Upload Photo
23 Maxwell Drive, Including Boundary Walls And Gatepiers			55°50′43″N 4°16′55″W		C(S)	33423	Upload Photo
33 Newark Drive, Including Boundary Walls And Gatepiers			55°50′24″N 4°16′58″W		B	33430	Upload Photo
58 Newark Drive, Ardlui, Including Boundary Walls And Gatepiers			55°50′27″N 4°17′13″W		C(S)	33437	Upload Photo
198 Nithsdale Road, Including Boundary Walls And Gatepiers			55°50′32″N 4°17′08″W		B	33449	Upload Photo
99 Dougrie Road, St Margaret Mary's RC Church And Presbytery			55°48′11″N 4°14′38″W		B	33331	Upload Photo
401 Govan Road, Summertown Road Carmichael Street 1-11 Merryland Street (Odd Nos) Former Govan Town Hall			55°51′24″N 4°18′00″W		B	33340	Upload another image See more images
784-796 (Even Nos) Govan Road, New Govan, Formerly St Mary's, Church Hall And Shops Below			55°51′46″N 4°18′40″W		B	33349	Upload Photo
Govan Road, Govan Cross Drinking Fountain			55°51′47″N 4°18′40″W		B	33350	Upload Photo
840, 860 Govan Road And Return Elevation To Pearce Street, Pearce Institute			55°51′49″N 4°18′46″W		A	33352	Upload Photo
149-153 (Odd Nos) Albert Drive, St Alberts' Roman Catholic Church And Hall			55°50′29″N 4°16′18″W		B	33367	Upload Photo
363 (Dunmorlie), 363A Albert Drive, Including Boundary Walls And Gatepiers			55°50′37″N 4°17′33″W		B	33373	Upload Photo
50 Dalziel Drive, Including Boundary Walls And Gatepiers			55°50′32″N 4°17′37″W		B	33374	Upload Photo
150-174 (Even Nos) Albert Drive And 88-92 (Even Nos) Forth Street, 59, 61 Glenapp Street			55°50′31″N 4°16′15″W		B	33376	Upload Photo
336, 338 Albert Drive, Including Boundary Walls And Gatepiers			55°50′40″N 4°17′11″W		B	33382	Upload Photo
23 Bruce Road			55°50′40″N 4°17′02″W		B	33389	Upload Photo
38 And 38A Dalziel Drive, Hazliebrae, Including Boundary Walls And Gatepiers			55°50′30″N 4°17′28″W		B	33396	Upload Photo
4 Nelson Mandela Place			55°51′44″N 4°15′13″W		A	33233	Upload another image
112, 114 West George Street And 46-50 (Even Nos) Renfield Street, Scottish Widows			55°51′45″N 4°15′22″W		B	33238	Upload Photo
278 West George Street, Former St Jude's Church			55°51′49″N 4°15′54″W		B	33250	Upload another image
58, 60 West Nile Street and 23 Nelson Mandela Place, West George Street			55°51′43″N 4°15′17″W		B	33253	Upload another image
130-134 (Even Nos) West Nile Street			55°51′49″N 4°15′15″W		C(S)	33256	Upload another image
51-57 (Odd Nos) West Regent Street, 59-69 (Odd Nos) Renfield Street And 18-22 (Even Nos) West Regent Lane, Castle Chambers			55°51′46″N 4°15′24″W		B	33257	Upload another image
121 West Regent Street, Ailsa Court			55°51′48″N 4°15′36″W		C(S)	33267	Upload Photo
98-104 (Even Nos) West Regent Street (Known As 100)			55°51′49″N 4°15′30″W		B	33272	Upload Photo
130, 132 West Regent Street			55°51′49″N 4°15′35″W		C(S)	33274	Upload Photo
148, 150 West Regent Street			55°51′49″N 4°15′37″W		B	33276	Upload Photo
Springburn Park, Winter Gardens			55°53′20″N 4°13′37″W		A	33298	Upload another image
200 Shieldhall Road, Drumoyne Primary School, Janitor's Lodge Gatepiers And Boundary Walls			55°51′22″N 4°19′55″W		B	33312	Upload Photo
201, 203 Pitt Street And 309-313 (Odd Nos) Sauchiehall Street			55°51′55″N 4°15′54″W		C(S)	33177	Upload Photo
429-453 (Odd Nos) Sauchiehall Street			55°51′57″N 4°16′10″W		B	33181	Upload another image
94-102 (Even Nos) Sauchiehall Street, Crown Rooms			55°51′53″N 4°15′23″W		B	33188	Upload another image
116-120 (Even Nos) Sauchiehall Street And 257A, 259 Hope Street			55°51′54″N 4°15′27″W		B	33189	Upload another image
500-516 (Even Nos) Sauchiehall Street, Known As 516			55°51′59″N 4°16′10″W		B	33197	Upload Photo
528-538 (Even Nos) Sauchiehall Street, Albany Chambers			55°51′59″N 4°16′12″W		A	33199	Upload another image
2-14 (Inclusive Nos) Somerset Place And 2, 4 Clifton Street (Sauchiehall Street)			55°51′59″N 4°16′37″W		B	33202	Upload Photo
54-76 (Even Nos) Union Street And 55, 57, 63 Mitchell Street			55°51′34″N 4°15′23″W		B	33206	Upload Photo
50 Waterloo Street With 81 Wellington Street, Former Waterloo Street Post Office, Parcels Office			55°51′38″N 4°15′40″W		A	33214	Upload Photo
65 St Vincent Street And 26, 28 West Nile Street			55°51′40″N 4°15′18″W		B	33132	Upload Photo
125, 127 St Vincent Street And 127, 129 Hope Street, Norwich Union Chambers			55°51′41″N 4°15′31″W		B	33140	Upload another image
145 St Vincent Street, Wellington Street And 60-66 St Vincent Lane			55°51′42″N 4°15′35″W		B	33142	Upload another image
110, 120 St Vincent Street And 29-37 (Odd Nos) Renfield Street And West George Lane, Bank Of Scotland			55°51′43″N 4°15′26″W		A	33156	Upload another image
188-192 (Even Nos) St Vincent Street			55°51′44″N 4°15′38″W		C(S)	33161	Upload another image
2-5 (Inclusive Nos) La Belle Place			55°52′00″N 4°16′47″W		A	33083	Upload Photo
60-76 (Even Nos) Mitchell Street, Former Glasgow Herald Building			55°51′35″N 4°15′20″W		A	33087	Upload another image
1-11 (Odd Nos) Renfield Street And 60-70 (Even Nos) Gordon Street			55°51′39″N 4°15′26″W		B	33100	Upload another image
194 Renfrew Street			55°52′00″N 4°15′54″W		C(S)	33109	Upload Photo
71-75 (Odd Nos) Robertson Street And 58, 60 Robertson Lane			55°51′30″N 4°15′42″W		A	33112	Upload Photo
15 - 21 (Odd Nos) Gordon Street			55°51′37″N 4°15′19″W		B	33026	Upload Photo
2-10 (Even Nos) Bath Street And 229 Buchanan Street, Commercial Hotel			55°51′49″N 4°15′12″W		C(S)	32964	Upload Photo
8-13 (Inclusive Nos) Known As 8 Blythswood Square, 173 West Regent Street, 258 West George Street, 135 West Regent Lane, Royal Scottish Automobile Club			55°51′48″N 4°15′43″W		B	32976	Upload another image
179 Buchanan Street, Former Athenaeum Theatre			55°51′45″N 4°15′14″W		A	33004	Upload another image
1-9 (Odd Nos) Corunna Street And 1131-1143 (Odd Nos) Argyle Street			55°51′52″N 4°17′05″W		B	33013	Upload Photo
34, 38 Elliot Street (Known as 38 Elliot Street)			55°51′43″N 4°16′45″W		B	33018	Upload another image
17 Vinicombe Street, The Salon Including Boundary Wall and Railings			55°52′37″N 4°17′26″W		A	32934	Upload another image
145-167 (Odd Nos) Bath Street, 257 West Campbell Street, And 144-148 (Even Nos) Bath Lane			55°51′51″N 4°15′42″W		B	32959	Upload Photo
201-205 (Odd Nos) Bath Street, Adelaide Place (South)			55°51′52″N 4°15′51″W		C(S)	32961	Upload Photo
University Avenue, University Of Glasgow, Gatepiers And Railings Quincentenary Gates			55°52′20″N 4°17′17″W		B	32915	Upload another image
3-9A (Odd Nos) Burgh Hall Street, Partick Burgh Halls			55°52′17″N 4°18′31″W		B	32852	Upload another image
174, 176 Byres Road And 1, 3 Ashton Road			55°52′28″N 4°17′39″W		B	32854	Upload another image
41 Cresswell Street And 30 Cranworth Street, Hillhead Baptist Church			55°52′34″N 4°17′29″W		B	32860	Upload Photo
121 Great George Street, Extension To Laurel Bank School, Former Belmont Church			55°52′29″N 4°17′27″W		B	32871	Upload another image
56 Glassford Street And 53 Hutcheson Street			55°51′31″N 4°14′55″W		C(S)	32804	Upload Photo
76-84 (Even Nos) Wilson Street With 58-68 (Even Nos) Virginia Street			55°51′32″N 4°14′58″W		B	32809	Upload Photo
4-6 (Even Nos) North Court			55°51′39″N 4°15′09″W		B	32810	Upload another image
32-44 (Even Nos) Queen Street			55°51′31″N 4°15′07″W		B	32820	Upload Photo
Queen Street Station, Train Shed And Bridge Over Railway On Cathedral Street			55°51′45″N 4°15′04″W		A	32822	Upload another image See more images
Queen Street Duke Of Wellington Statue			55°51′36″N 4°15′07″W		A	32823	Upload another image
6 Rottenrow East And 1 Macleod Street, Castle Street, And Cathedral Square, Barony Church And Church Hall With War Memorial, Retaining Wall, Railings And Gatepiers			55°51′43″N 4°14′14″W		A	32824	Upload another image See more images
102 Royston Road, Royston School, Formerly St Rollox School			55°52′09″N 4°13′44″W		B	32829	Upload Photo
2 St Vincent Place And 2 And 4 Anchor Lane			55°51′40″N 4°15′07″W		A	32838	Upload another image
141-197 (Odd Nos) Howard Street With 63 Dunlop Street And 98-100 (Even Nos) Stockwell Street			55°51′20″N 4°15′01″W		B	32725	Upload another image See more images
72-82 (Even Nos) Howard Street			55°51′23″N 4°15′14″W		B	32727	Upload Photo
150 (Even Nos) Ingram Street			55°51′35″N 4°14′50″W		B	32743	Upload Photo
61-63 (Odd Nos) Miller Street			55°51′33″N 4°15′05″W		A	32758	Upload Photo
109-121 (Odd Nos) Trongate And 9 New Wynd, Including Britannia Panopticon Music Hall			55°51′25″N 4°14′49″W		A	32774	Upload another image
82-92 (Even Nos) Castle Street, Royal Infirmary, Including Clock Tower Building And Archway, Gates And Railings			55°51′54″N 4°14′08″W		B	32650	Upload another image
Cathedral Square, Bridge Of Sighs, Gates, Gatepiers, And Lodge To Bridge Of Sighs With 50 Cathedral Square (Superintendent's House)			55°51′45″N 4°14′08″W		A	32651	Upload another image
20 Cathedral Square, Glasgow Evangelical Church; (Former Barony North Church) And Boundary Walls And Railings, And Church House, 14 Cathedral Square			55°51′41″N 4°14′06″W		A	32652	Upload another image
55-57 (Odd Nos) Cochrane Street And 20 South Frederick Street			55°51′38″N 4°14′56″W		C(S)	32674	Upload Photo
9 Garth Street With 76 Glassford Street			55°51′33″N 4°14′55″W		B	32684	Upload Photo
80 George Square Glasgow City Chambers And Lampbrackets To George Square			55°51′40″N 4°14′55″W		A	32691	Upload another image
44 Glassford Street			55°51′30″N 4°14′56″W		B	32714	Upload Photo
252-284 (Even Nos) High Street And 1-5 (Odd Nos) Duke Street (Bell O'The Brae Tenements)			55°51′38″N 4°14′20″W		B	32724	Upload another image
49-51 (Inclusive Nos) Westbourne Gardens			55°52′53″N 4°18′12″W		B	32604	Upload Photo
63 Argyle Street (Buck's Head Buildings)			55°51′27″N 4°15′05″W		A	32608	Upload another image
6-20 (Even Nos) Bell Street			55°51′29″N 4°14′43″W		B	32622	Upload Photo
26-36 (Even Nos) Bell Street And 45 Albion Street			55°51′28″N 4°14′42″W		B	32623	Upload Photo
102-104 Brunswick Street, Known As 104 Brunswick Street			55°51′32″N 4°14′48″W		B	32627	Upload Photo
16 Buchanan Street			55°51′31″N 4°15′16″W		B	32631	Upload another image
116-128 (Even Nos) Buchanan Street And 41 St Vincent Place (St Vincent Chambers)			55°51′39″N 4°15′13″W		B	32641	Upload another image
125-127 (Odd Nos) Candleriggs			55°51′34″N 4°14′44″W		C(S)	32646	Upload Photo
1 Princes Terrace, Prince Albert Road, With Gatepiers And Railings To Princes Terrace Lane			55°52′37″N 4°18′03″W		A	32576	Upload another image
33 Victoria Crescent Road, (Kings Gate)			55°52′34″N 4°17′53″W		B	32595	Upload Photo
1 Lancaster Crescent, Gatepiers And Railings, Great Western Road			55°52′58″N 4°18′09″W		B	32554	Upload Photo

== Key ==
The scheme for classifying buildings in Scotland is:

- Category A: "buildings of national or international importance, either architectural or historic; or fine, little-altered examples of some particular period, style or building type."
- Category B: "buildings of regional or more than local importance; or major examples of some particular period, style or building type, which may have been altered."
- Category C: "buildings of local importance; lesser examples of any period, style, or building type, as originally constructed or moderately altered; and simple traditional buildings which group well with other listed buildings."

In March 2016 there were 47,288 listed buildings in Scotland. Of these, 8% were Category A, and 50% were Category B, with the remaining 42% being Category C.

== See also ==
- List of listed buildings in Glasgow
