= Partick Police Station =

Municipal building in Partick, Scotland

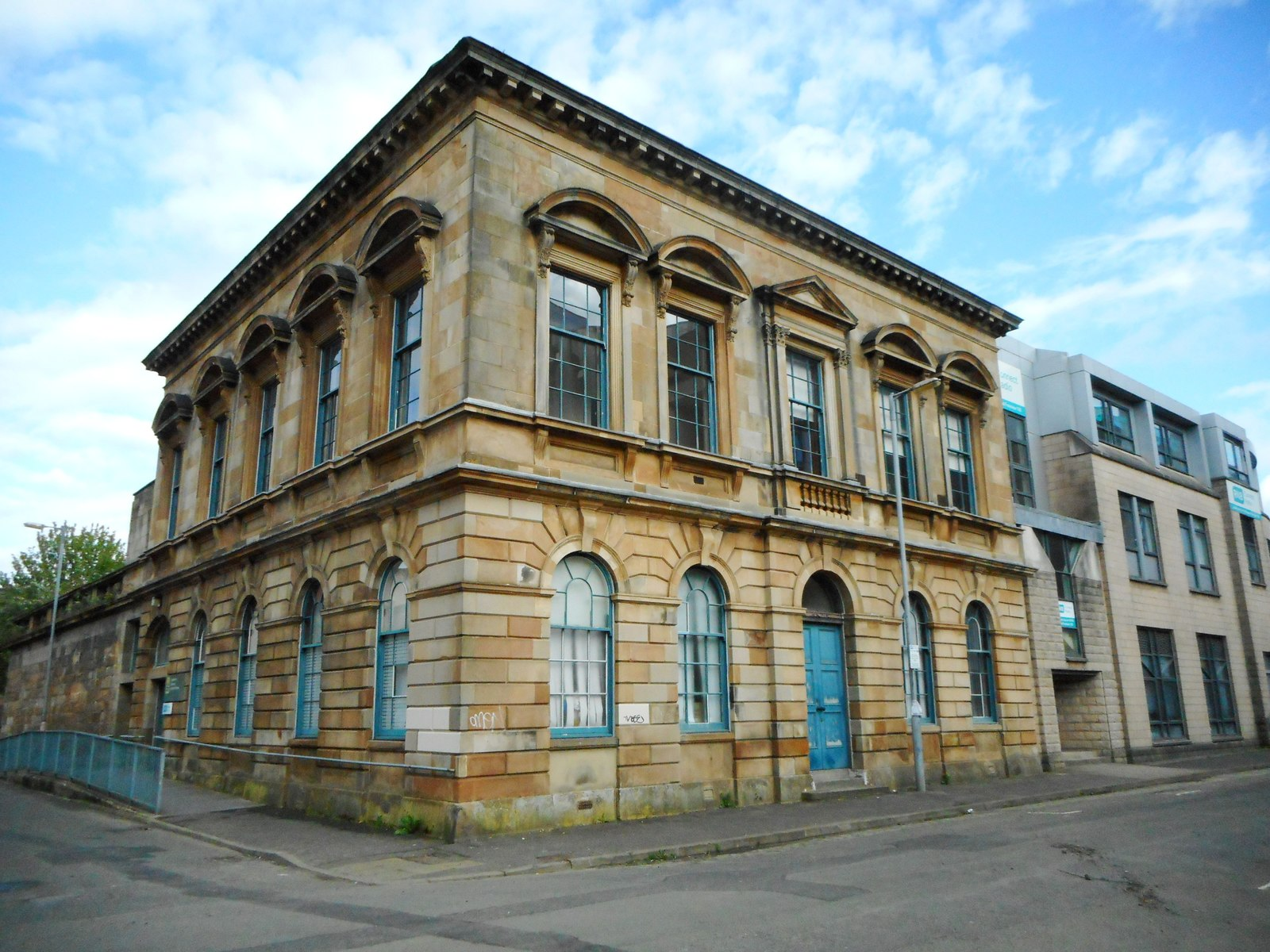
- The building in 2019

- Shown in Glasgow
- 55.8697°N 4.3055°W
- Location: Anderson Street, Partick

History
- Built: 1853

Site notes
- Architect: Charles Wilson
- Architectural style: Palazzo-style

Listed Building – Category B
- Official name: 47 Anderson Street, 23 Gullane Street, Partick Police Station
- Designated: 6 February 1989
- Reference no.: LB32845

Partick Police Station, previously known as Partick Police Court and also as the Old Burgh Hall, is a former municipal and judicial building on Anderson Street in Partick, Scotland. The building, which was previously the meeting place of the burgh council and now serves as the offices of the Centre for Sensory Impaired People, is a Category B listed building.

== History ==
Civic leaders in Partick decided to form a police burgh in 1852. The new police commissioners immediately set about procuring a new meeting place: the site they selected was on the corner of Anderson Street and Wilson Street (now Gullane Street), just north of the River Kelvin. The new building was designed by Charles Wilson in the Palazzo-style, built in ashlar stone and was completed in 1853.

The design involved a symmetrical main frontage of five bays facing onto Anderson Street. The ground floor was rusticated and the central bay featured a round headed doorway with a fanlight, voussoirs and a keystone. On the first floor, there was a sash window, fronted by a balustrade, and enclosed in an aedicula, formed by pilasters supporting brackets and a triangular pediment. The other bays were fenestrated with round headed casement windows with voussoirs and keystones on the ground floor, and by sash windows flanked by pilasters supporting brackets and segmental pediments on the first floor. At roof level, there was a modillioned cornice. Internally, the principal rooms were the offices for the police constables, the police court and cells for the prisoners.

The building continued to serve as the meeting place of the burgh commissioners until they relocated to the new Partick Burgh Hall in Burgh Hall Street in 1872. Meanwhile, the old building in Anderson Street continued to operate as the local police station: a long single-storey cell block extending along Gullane Street was added in the late 19th century. After Partick was annexed by Glasgow in 1912, the building became the headquarters of 'L' (Partick) Division of the City of Glasgow Police and, after 'L' (Partick) Division merged with 'B' (Western) Division, it became the headquarters of 'B' (Marine) Division, which took on responsibility for policing the riverside quays and warehouses.

The building played a central role in the investigations into the Bible John murders in the 1960s and then played a fictional role in the ITV television programme Taggart starring Mark McManus in the 1980s. The building ceased serving as a police station when the police service relocated to a new headquarters in Dumbarton Road in 1993. Since then it has served as the offices of the Centre for Sensory Impaired People. An extension to the southeast was designed in the modern style, built in yellow stone and completed in 2000.

== See also ==
- List of listed buildings in Glasgow/11
