= Glasgow City Chambers =

Municipal building in Glasgow, Scotland

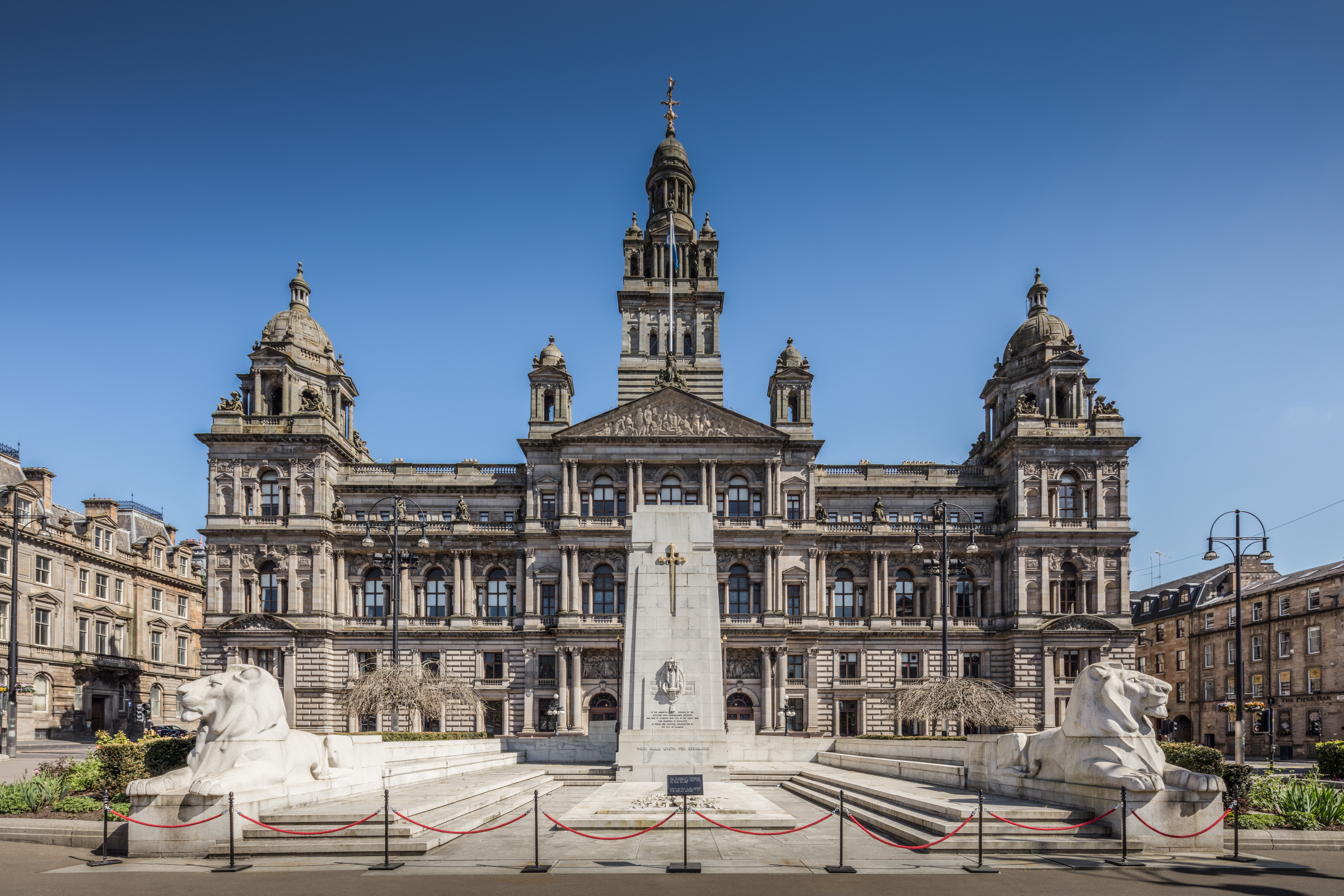
- The front of the City Chambers, from George Square
- Interactive map of the Glasgow City Chambers area

General information
- Type: Municipal building
- Architectural style: Victorian
- Location: George Square; G2 1DU, Glasgow, Scotland
- Coordinates: 55°51′40″N 4°14′55″W
- Construction started: 1882
- Completed: 1888
- Owner: Glasgow City Council

Design and construction
- Architect: William Young
- Other designers: John Mossman and George Lawson (sculptors)
- Main contractor: Morrison and Mason

Other information
- Public transit: Buchanan Street

Website
- Official website

Listed Building – Category A
- Designated: 15 December 1970
- Reference no.: LB32691

The City Chambers or Municipal Buildings in Glasgow, Scotland, has functioned as the headquarters of Glasgow City Council since 1996, and of preceding forms of municipal government in the city since 1889. It is located on the eastern side of the city's George Square. It is a Category A listed building.

== History ==
The need for a new city chambers had been apparent since the 18th century, with the old Glasgow Tolbooth at Glasgow Cross becoming insufficient for the purposes of civic government in a growing town with greater political responsibilities. In 1814, the tolbooth was sold – with the exception of the steeple, which still remains – and the council chambers moved to the public buildings in the Saltmarket, near Glasgow Green. A subsequent move took the city council to the city and county buildings between Wilson Street and Ingram Street in 1844. In the early 1880s, City Architect John Carrick was asked to identify a suitable site for a purpose-built City Council Chambers. Carrick identified the east side of George Square, which was then bought.

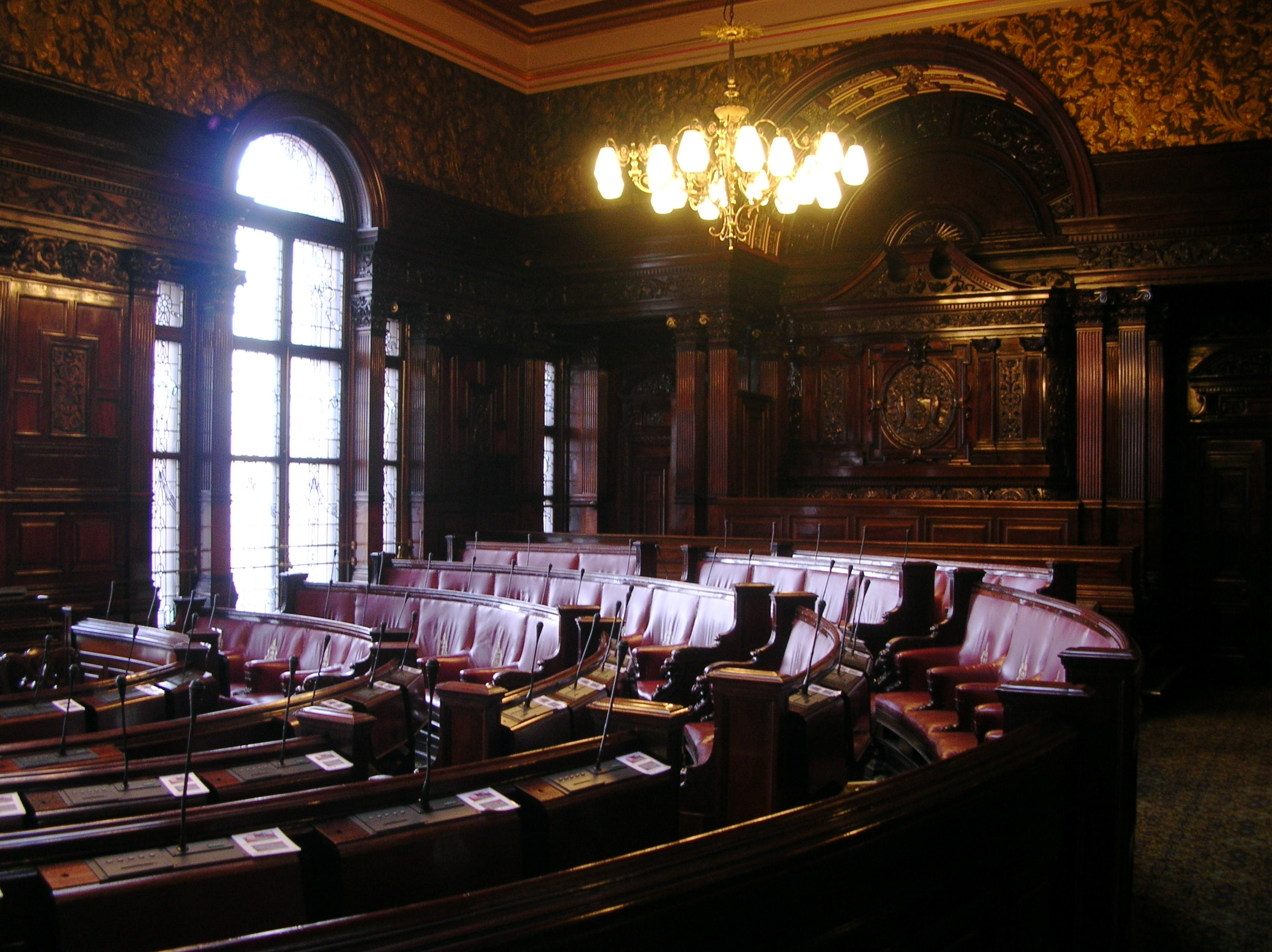
The Council Chamber

Following a design competition, the building was designed by the Scottish architect William Young in the Victorian style and construction started in 1882. The building was inaugurated by Queen Victoria in August 1888 and the first council meeting held within the chambers took place in October 1889. An extension connected by pairs of archways across John Street was completed in 1912 and Exchange House in George Street was completed in the mid-1980s.

The new City Chambers initially housed Glasgow Town Council from 1888 to 1895, when that body was replaced by Glasgow Corporation. It remained the corporation's headquarters until it was replaced by Glasgow District Council under the wider Strathclyde Regional Council in May 1975. It then remained the Glasgow District Council headquarters until the abolition of the Strathclyde Region led to the formation of Glasgow City Council in April 1996.

== Architecture ==
=== Exterior ===
The building is in the Beaux arts style, an interpretation of Renaissance Classicism incorporating Italianate styles with a vast range of ornate decoration, used to express the wealth and industrial export-led economic prosperity of the Second City of the Empire. The exterior sculpture, by James Alexander Ewing, included the central Jubilee Pediment as its centrepiece. Although originally intended to feature a figure symbolising Glasgow 'with the Clyde at her feet sending her manufactures to all the world', the Pediment was redesigned to celebrate Queen Victoria's Golden Jubilee. It depicts Victoria enthroned, surrounded by emblematic figures of Scotland, England, Ireland and Wales, alongside the colonies of the British Empire (mostly British India). Ewing also designed the apex sculptures of Truth, Riches, and Honour, and the statues of The Four Seasons on the Chamber's tower. The central apex figure of Truth is popularly known as Glasgow's Statue of Liberty, because of its close resemblance to the similarly posed, but very much larger, statue in New York harbour.

=== Interior ===
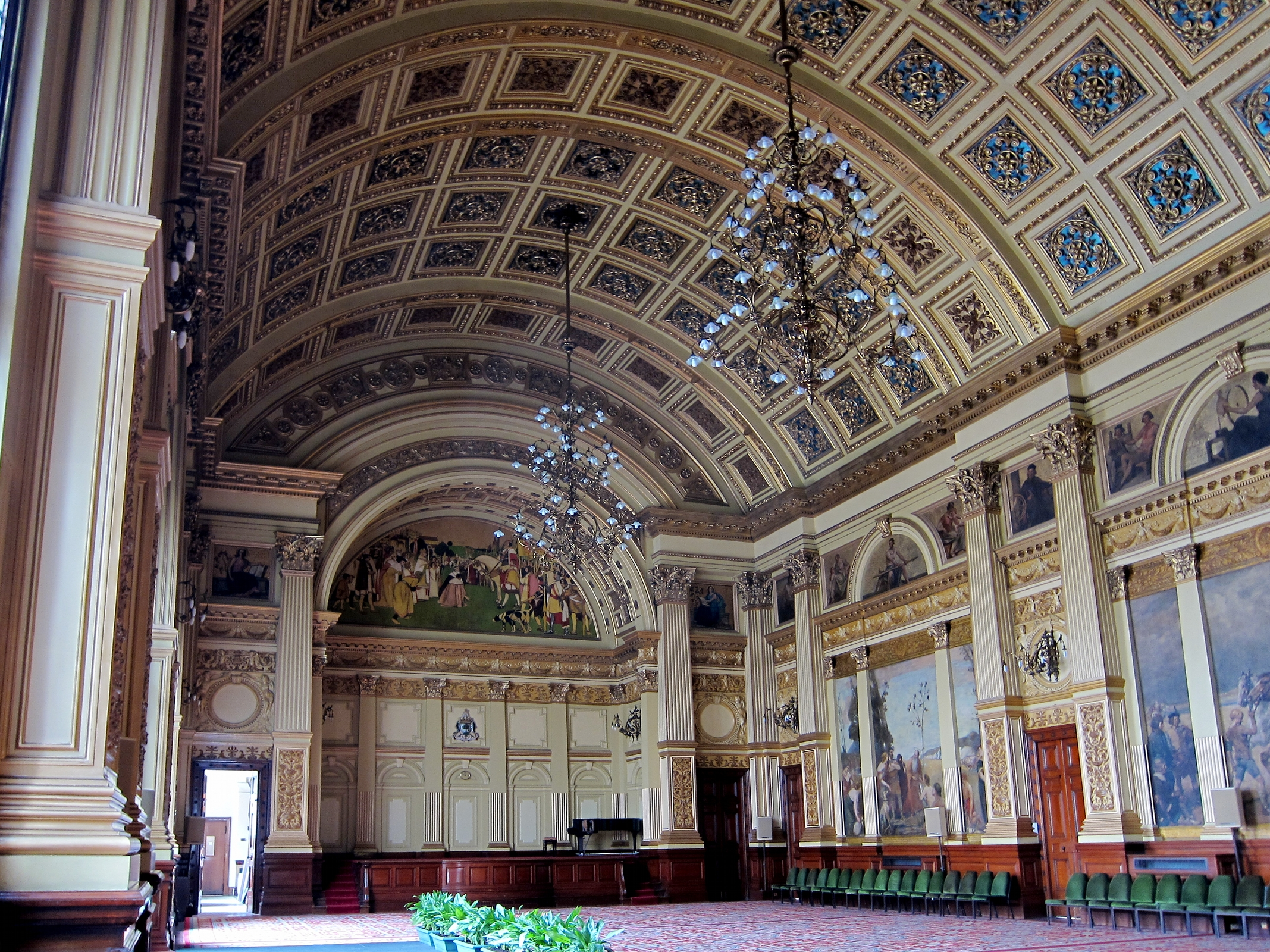
The Banqueting Hall

The entrance hall of the Chambers displays a mosaic of the city's coat of arms on the floor, which dates from the 1950s when the city's coat of arms was last modified. The arms reflect legends about Glasgow's patron saint, Saint Mungo, and include four emblems – the bird, tree, bell, and fish – as remembered in the following verse:

Here's the Bird that never flew
Here's the Tree that never grew
Here's the Bell that never rang
Here's the Fish that never swam

The ornate banqueting hall, which is 33.5 m (110 ft) long by 14.6 m (48 ft) wide and 15.8 m (52 ft) high, is decorated with huge murals by the Glasgow Boys. The decoration was co-ordinated by architect William Leiper. The room hosted Nelson Mandela and Sir Alex Ferguson when they received the Freedom of the City in 1993 and 1999, respectively. In March 2015, it hosted the medal ceremony for Bob Fulton, Robert Somerville and John Keenan, three retired Rolls-Royce factory workers, honoured for their boycott against the Chilean Air Force during the dictatorship of General Pinochet of Chile. The ceremony is part of the documentary Nae Pasaran. The Council Chamber is clad in Spanish mahogany panelling and its windows are made of Venetian stained glass.

== In popular culture ==
The building was used as a stand in for the British Embassy in Moscow in the film An Englishman Abroad in 1983, and as the Vatican in Heavenly Pursuits in 1986. It was also used for the film The House of Mirth in 2000 and featured more recently in the television series Outlander.

== Gallery ==
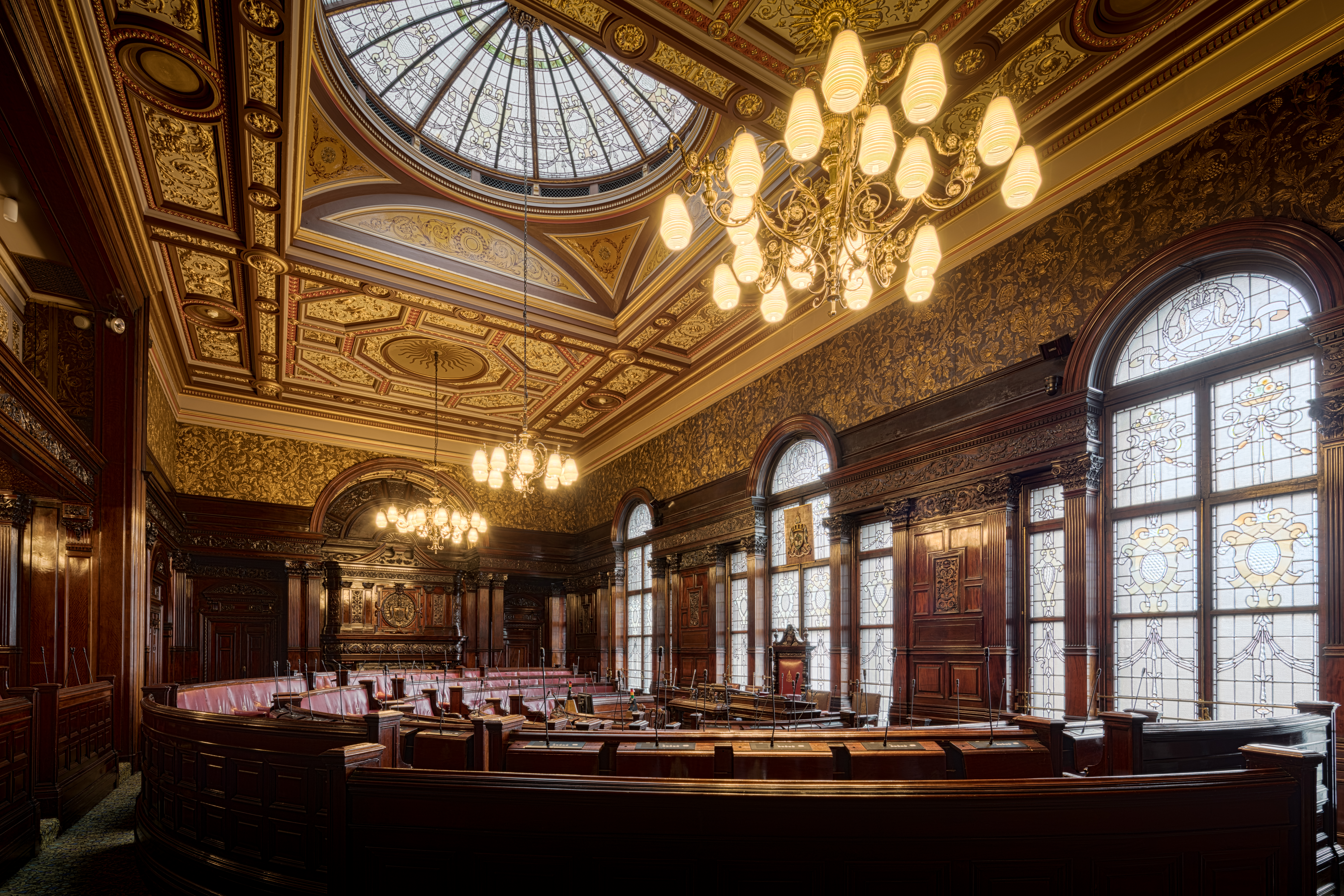
The Council Chambers

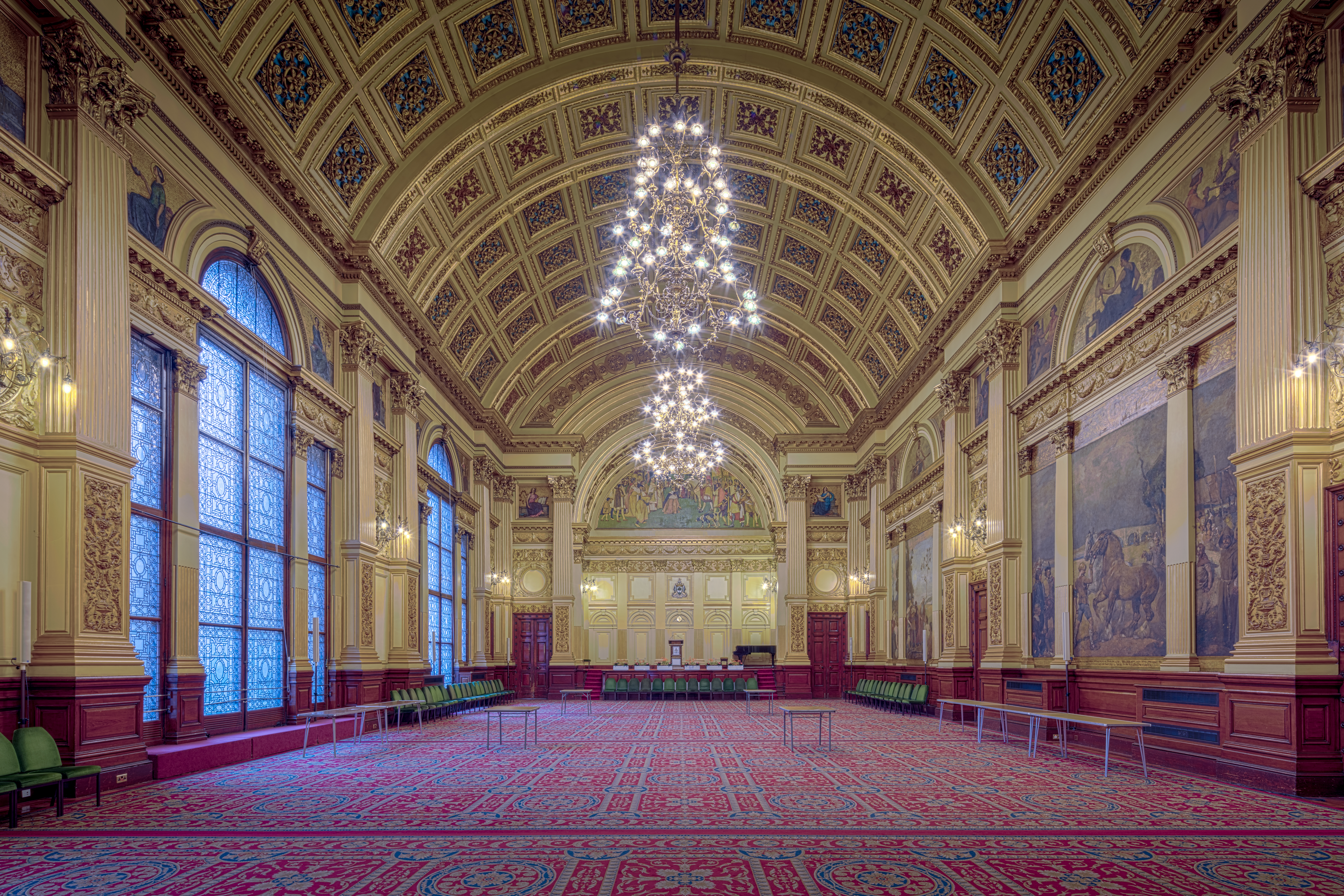
The Banqueting Hall

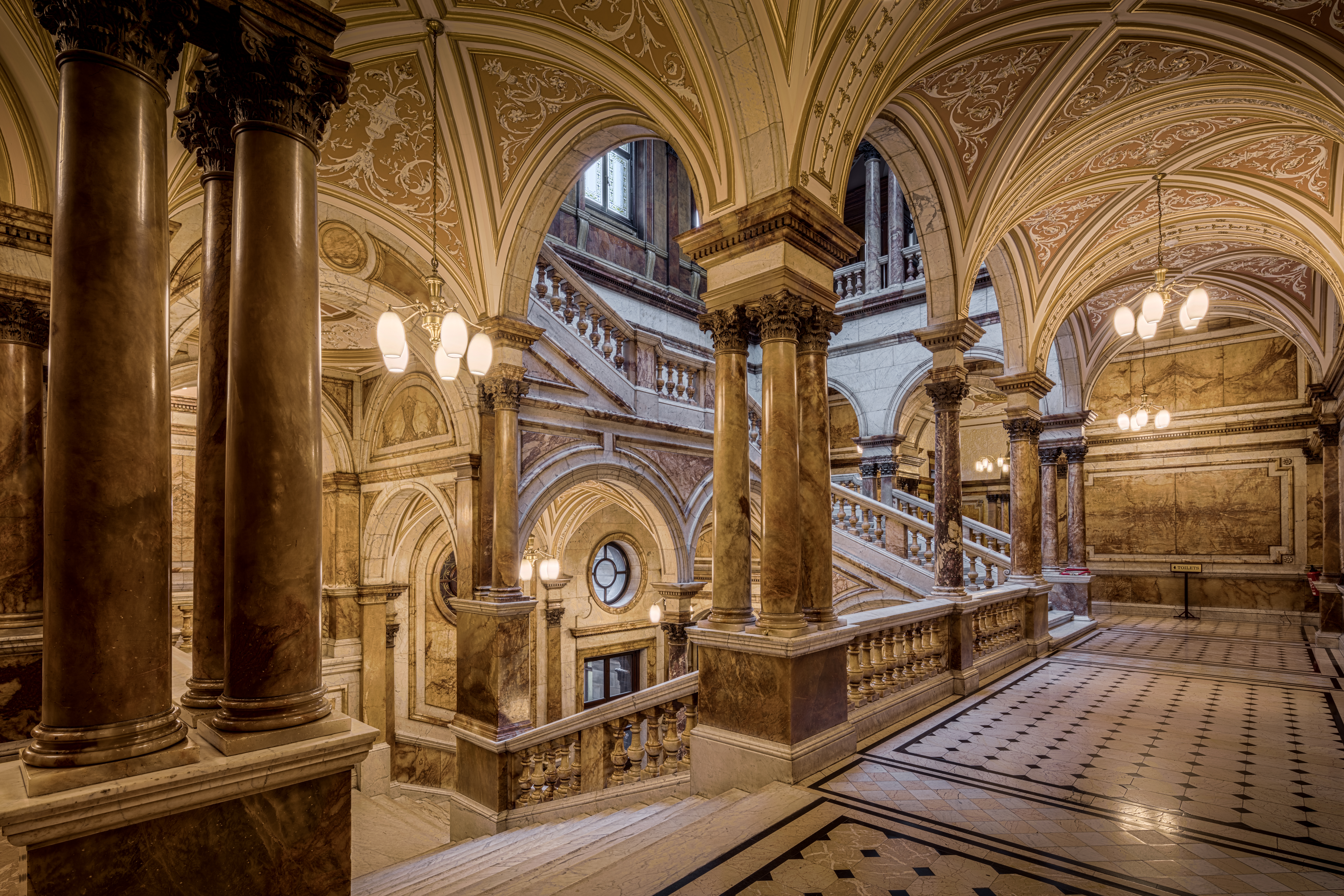
The Staircase

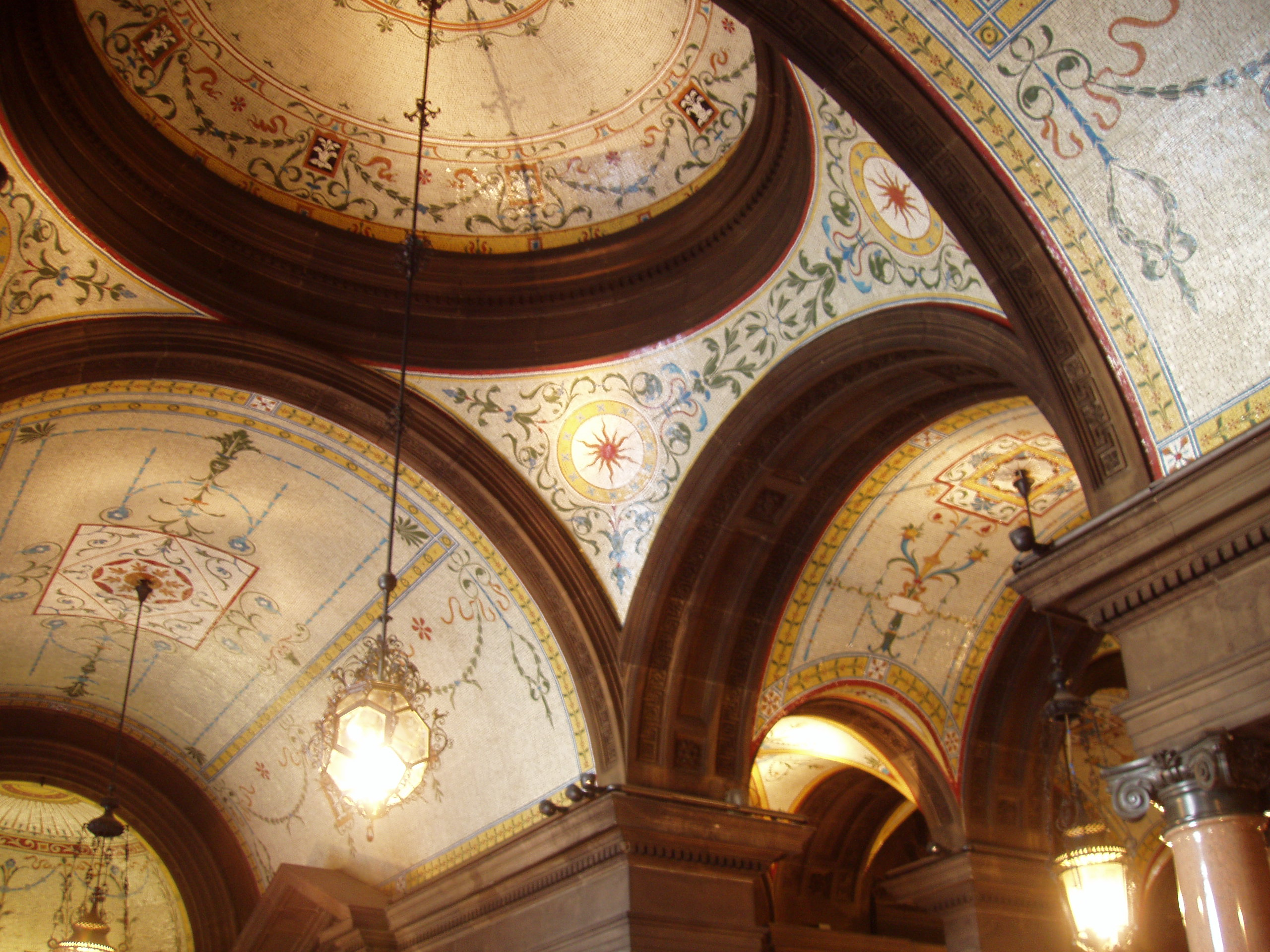
Mosaic ceiling of the ground floor Loggia

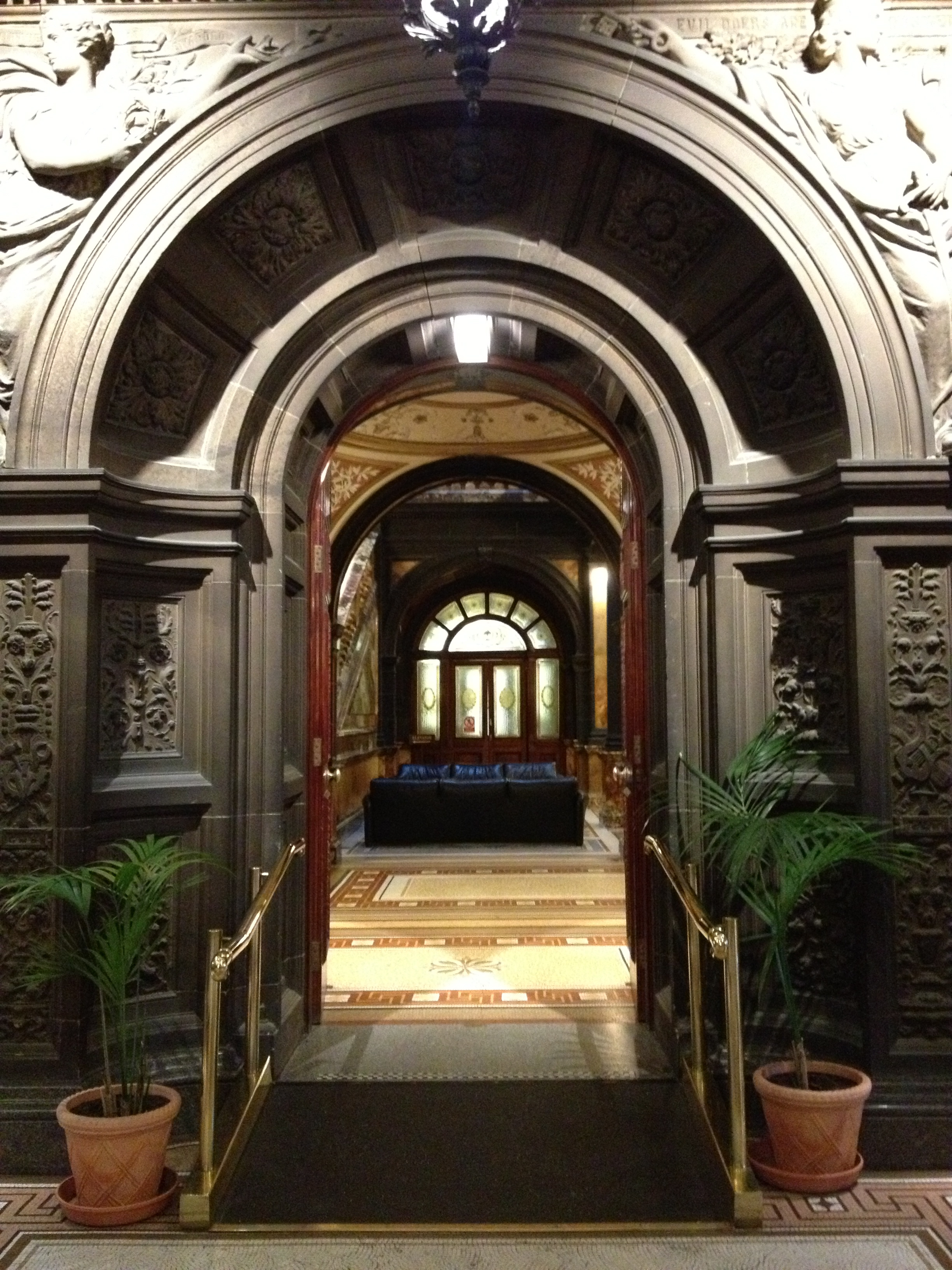
The main entrance

== See also ==
- List of listed buildings in Glasgow/6
- List of Category A listed buildings in Glasgow
- Dunfermline City Chambers
- Edinburgh City Chambers
- List of tallest buildings and structures in Glasgow
