= Whiteinch =

Area of Glasgow, Scotland

Coordinates: 55.872239°N 4.331805°W

Whiteinch: Scottish Gaelic: Innis Bhàn
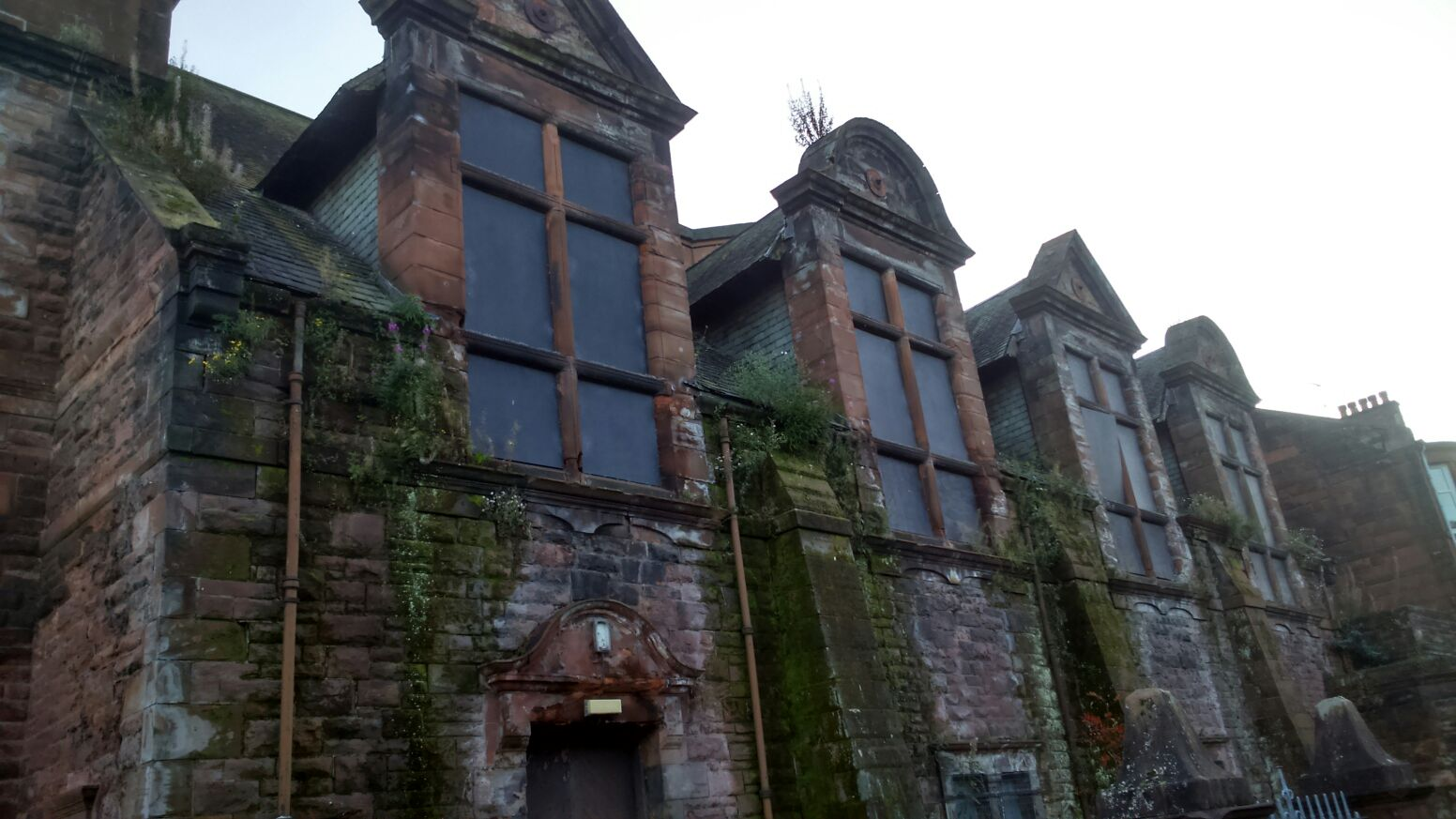
- Whiteinch Burgh Hall

- Location within Glasgow
- OS grid reference: NS542668
- Council area: Glasgow City Council
- Lieutenancy area: Glasgow
- Country: Scotland
- Sovereign state: United Kingdom
- Post town: GLASGOW
- Postcode district: G14
- Dialling code: 0141
- Police: Scotland
- Fire: Scottish
- Ambulance: Scottish
- UK Parliament: Glasgow North West
- Scottish Parliament: Glasgow Kelvin

Whiteinch (Scottish Gaelic: Innis Bhàn) is an area in the city of Glasgow, Scotland. It is situated directly north of the River Clyde, between the Partick and Scotstoun areas of the city. Whiteinch was at one stage part of the burgh of Partick, until that burgh's absorption into the expanding city of Glasgow in 1912, and part of the Parish of Govan.

== History ==
White Inch was originally an island in the Clyde, called Whyt Inch (inch being an anglicisation of "innis", meaning an island in the Scottish Gaelic language). However, this was during the time when the Clyde flowed naturally as a shallow and wide river. When it was dredged and narrowed as a man-made enterprise to allow for shipbuilding, the island disappeared, but the name lived on in the area that now sat on the north bank of the river.

The population growth of Whiteinch was linked to industrial growth, primarily shipbuilding. The Clydeholm shipyard of the Barclay Curle company occupied much of the Whiteinch riverbank and was opened in 1855. Whiteinch Burgh Hall was completed in 1894.

Whiteinch was an important Clyde ferry crossing. A rowing boat ferry was replaced by a steam ferry in 1891 and the Clyde's second vehicular "horse" ferry was introduced in 1905. Both passenger and vehicle ferries, which ran from the foot of Ferryden Street, were withdrawn in 1963 with the opening of the Clyde Tunnel.

Besides having a football club called Whiteinch F.C. between 1874 and 1879, Partick Thistle F.C. were based in the Whiteinch district for a short while; they played at Jordanvale Park in the area from 1881 to 1883 before moving to Muir Park in the centre of Partick. They then returned to the Whiteinch area in 1885 when they moved into the Inchview home of their defunct rivals Partick, remaining there until 1897; today this is near the location of the Clyde Tunnel's north entrance.

Whiteinch is the location of the Fossil Grove, a site within Victoria Park, Glasgow discovered in 1887 and containing the fossilized stumps of 11 extinct Lepidodendron ("Giant club moss") trees. It has been a popular tourist attraction since early times.

In late 2006 the new Whiteinch Community Centre opened at Dumbarton Road and Haldane Street. The building cost £1.1m and was a joint project between Glasgow City Council, Whiteinch and Scotstoun housing association and the Whiteinch Community Council. Buildings lost include the 1920s public baths on Medwyn Street which included a Victorian-style Turkish bath and which closed in 1995.

St Paul's Church, (1957) designed by architect Charles W Gray of Reginald Fairlie and Partners. Coloured glass by Gabriel Loire of Chartres, France. Listed on account of the windows as Category B.

With regard to schools, non-denominational education is provided at Whiteinch Primary School in Medwyn Street, followed by Hyndland Secondary School. Roman Catholic Education is provided at St. Paul's Primary School in Primrose Street, followed by St. Thomas Aquinas Secondary School in Jordanhill.

In popular culture, the district lends half of its name to the fictional Shieldinch area which is the setting for the BBC Scotland soap opera River City (the other half deriving from Shieldhall on the opposite bank of the Clyde) - the show's set is located in Dumbarton).

== See also ==
- History of Partick
