= Whiteinch Burgh Hall =

Municipal building in Whiteinch, Scotland

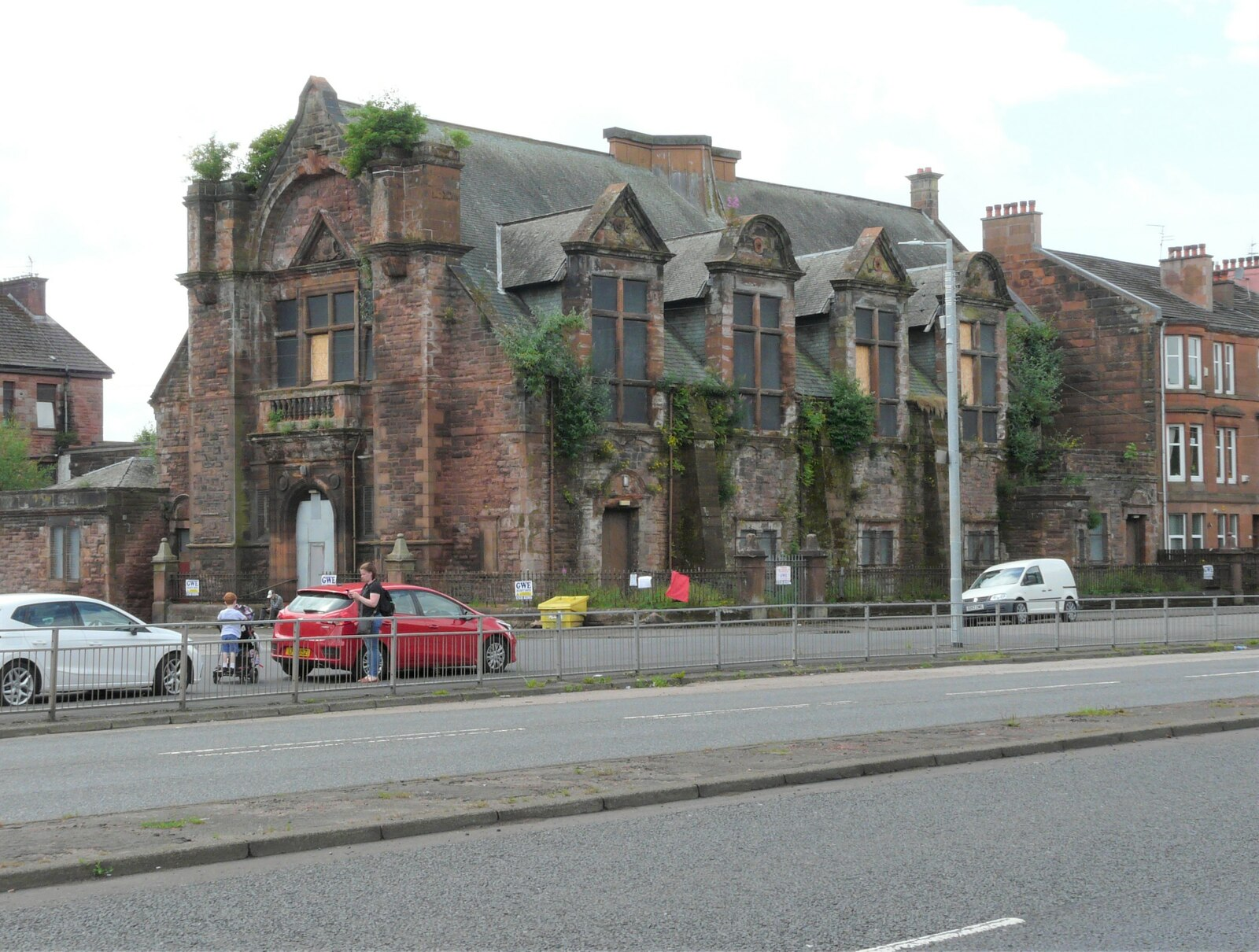
- The building in 2021

- Shown in Glasgow
- 55.8744°N 4.3343°W
- Location: Victoria Park Drive South, Glasgow

History
- Built: 1894

Site notes
- Architectural style: Scottish Renaissance style

Listed Building – Category B
- Official name: 35 Inchlee Street, 15, 16 Victoria Park Drive South Former Whiteinch Burgh Hall and former police station, former fire station including boundary wall, gatepiers and railings
- Designated: 16 May 2006
- Reference no.: LB50283

Whiteinch Burgh Hall is a municipal building on Victoria Park Drive South in Whiteinch, part of Glasgow, Scotland. The burgh hall, which is currently derelict, is a Category B listed building.

== History ==
Following significant population growth in the area, largely associated with the shipbuilding industry, Partick Burgh Council decided to commission a local events venue for the Whiteinch area. The site they selected was adjacent to Victoria Park, which had been part of the Oswald family estate, centred on Scotstoun House.

The new building was designed in the Scottish Renaissance style, built in red sandstone and was completed in 1894. The design involved an asymmetrical main frontage of four bays facing onto Victoria Park Drive. The first bay on the left featured a doorway with a curved pediment. On the ground floor, the other bays contained small bi-partite windows while the first floor was fenestrated by tall mullioned and transomed dormer windows with alternating triangular and curved pediments. The bays were separated by buttresses and there was originally a central roof lantern. At the east end, there was a round doorway with a keystone and roundels in the spandrels; on the first floor, there was a mullioned and transomed window with a triangular pediment, set in a large round headed arch, all surmounted by a gable. The east end also featured a pair of full-height towers flanking the central bay. Internally, the principal room was the main assembly hall which featured a stage and some fine plasterwork.

A single-storey police station was erected to the immediate south of the burgh hall and a three-storey fire station was erected to the south of the police station. A gabled two-storey extension was erected to the west of the fire station in 1905: this accommodated the local masonic lodge, St John's, throughout much of the 20th century.

The burgh hall continued to be administered by Partick Burgh Council until the burgh of Partick was annexed by Glasgow Corporation in 1912. The congregation of the local Baptist church met in the burgh hall in the early part of the 20th century. It became a popular venue for concerts, with the pianist, Desirée MacEwan, who was a preceptor at the Royal Academy of Music, performing there in 1926. During the Second World War, dances were frequently held there.

In the 1990s, the building was adapted for use by Glasgow City Council as a community centre. However, this use came to an end in 2002, and the building was deemed surplus to requirements in 2006. It subsequently became dilapidated and was placed on the Buildings at Risk Register for Scotland.

== See also ==
- List of listed buildings in Glasgow/11
