= Partick Castle =

Coordinates: 55.868389°N 4.304559°W

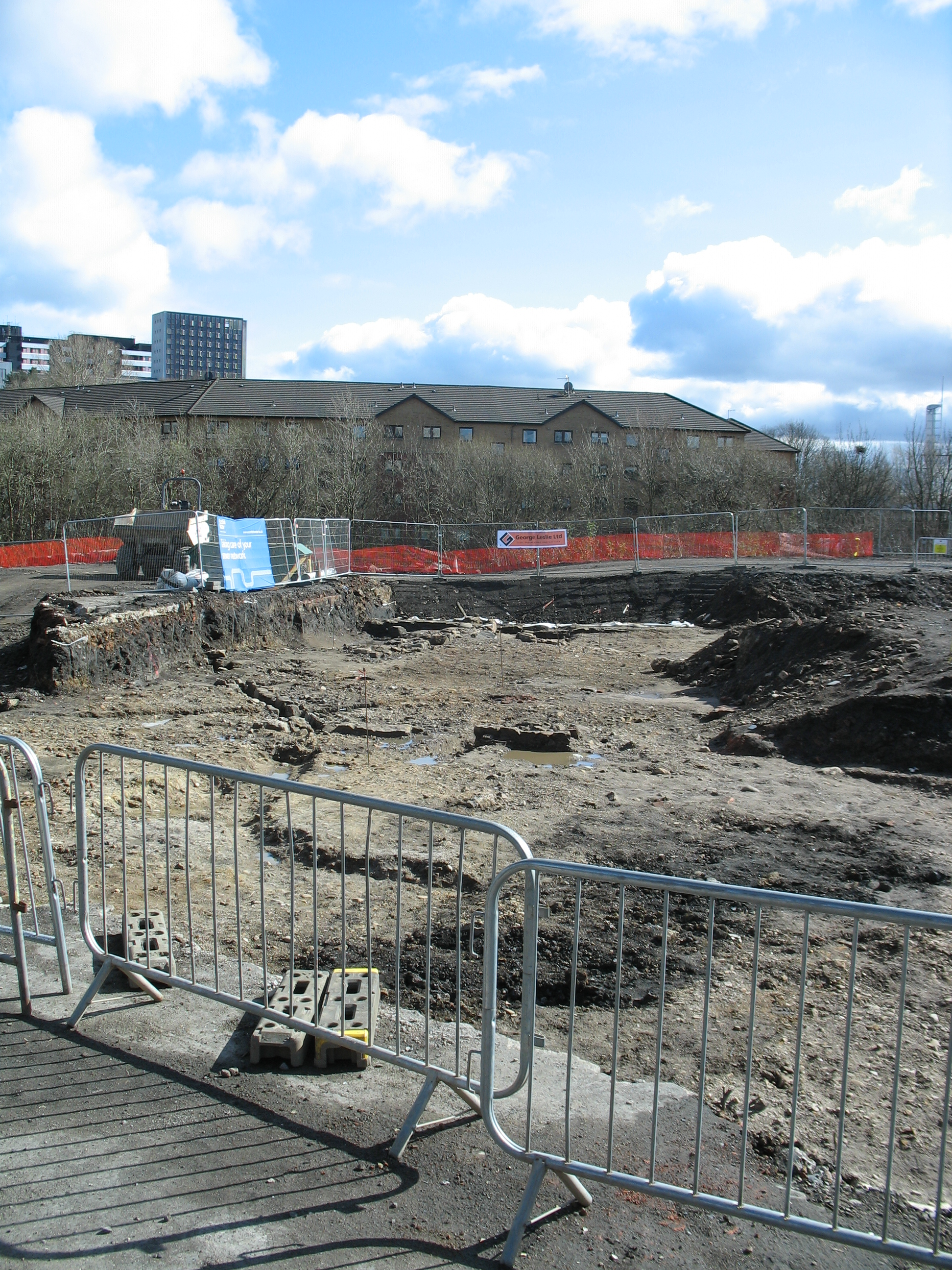
The archaeological dig of the site of Partick Castle, seen from Castlebank Street looking towards the Kelvin.

Partick Castle was located in Partick, now a Western suburb of Glasgow. It was built in 1611 for the Glasgow benefactor George Hutcheson and situated on the west bank of the River Kelvin.

== Description ==
Writing in the early eighteenth century, Hamilton of Wishaw described the building:

"...where Kelvin falls into Clyde, is the house of Pertique, a well-built and convenient house, well planted with barren timber and large gardens, which are enclosed with stone walls, and which formerly belonged to George Hutcheson in Glasgow, but now to John Crawford of Myltoun."

According to the local historian James Napier, it was left empty in 1770 and was unroofed and in ruins by 1783. It was demolished during the 1830s. Another local writer records that its remains were removed in a single night to 'form dykes in the neighbouring fields'. This happened in 1836 or 1837. Napier also provides an anecdotal description of the building in its later days when it was a tenanted property:

The account of the house given to me by a person who had often been in it when it was inhabited, was, that the under flat was partially sunk & vaulted. The second flat was entered by a few steps up, and had a stone floor laid on the arches. There were several apartments in this flat, which formed a sort of hostelry. The top flat had a deal floor and consisted of a large hall which was used for public gatherings, balls, and dancing parties, and over this flat were attics, which were used as bedrooms and for holding lumber. There was a well outside the house. The main entrance door was covered with large-headed nails, so also was a two-leafed door which formed the outer entrance to the grounds. The grounds being surrounded by a stone wall.

A poem published locally (in the Glasgow Magazine or the Bee) in the nineteenth century describes it thus:

Lo, Partick Castle, drear and lone,
Stands like a silent looker-on,
Where Clyde and Kelvin meet;
The long rank grass waves o’er its walls;
No sound is heard within its halls,
Save noise of distant waterfalls,
Where children lave their feet."

The castle's remains are likely to lie under the south-western end of the Tesco development site in Partick. The site was most recently a scrapyard but before that a dye-works, a foundry and a laundry. Unlike most of the old village of Partick, the castle's site was not removed by the excavations involved in the construction of the now disused Partick Central railway station. Rather, the castle site's solum was preserved under the aforementioned industrial buildings. As part of Scottish Water's Glasgow environmental improvement programme, part of the castle was uncovered & excavated by GUARD Archaeology.

== Bishop's Castle ==
Coat of arms of the Burgh of Partick, showing the castle and mitre of the Bishop of Glasgow

According to some sources, the site of Hutcheson's building was also the site of a castle and country residence of the Bishops of Glasgow. This is the castle depicted on the former Burgh of Partick's coat of arms. In 1136, King David had granted to the land of Partick (Perdeyc) to the See of Glasgow. In 1362, a settlement of a dispute between the Bishop and his chapter house was made at his manor-house of Perthic. Glasgow's Bishops continued to use their residence in Partick until the reformation in 1560, when Bishop James Beaton II fled to France from there, taking with him the sacred relics from Glasgow Cathedral. The remains of that castle may have been discovered near the mouth of the River Kelvin during work to install sewage pipes in 2016.

At the marriage of Sir George Elphinstone of Blythswood to Agnes Boyd in 1600, James VI promised the couple a bigger house. Sir George was given the New Park of Partick in order to manage the woodland, introduce deer, and build an 'ample' house for himself and for the king to resort to after hunting. This may have been built on the site of the Bishop's residence.

== Dark Ages Royal residence ==
There is some evidence that Partick was an important centre for the Kings of Alt Clut/Strathclyde. According to the Cistercian monk and hagiographer of St Kentigern, Jocelin of Furness, King Rhydderch had a residence in 'Pertnech' (Partick). Some archaeologists have deduced that the royal Partick estate was part of a larger elite centre of the kingdom, which included the ecclesiastical centre just across the River Clyde at Govan. The lands of Partick remained royal property until King David granted them to the Bishops of Glasgow.

There is no primary evidence that the site of Hutcheson's castle was the same as this royal residence.

== See also ==
- History of Partick
