= Port Dundas bascule bridge =

Bridge in Glasgow, Scotland

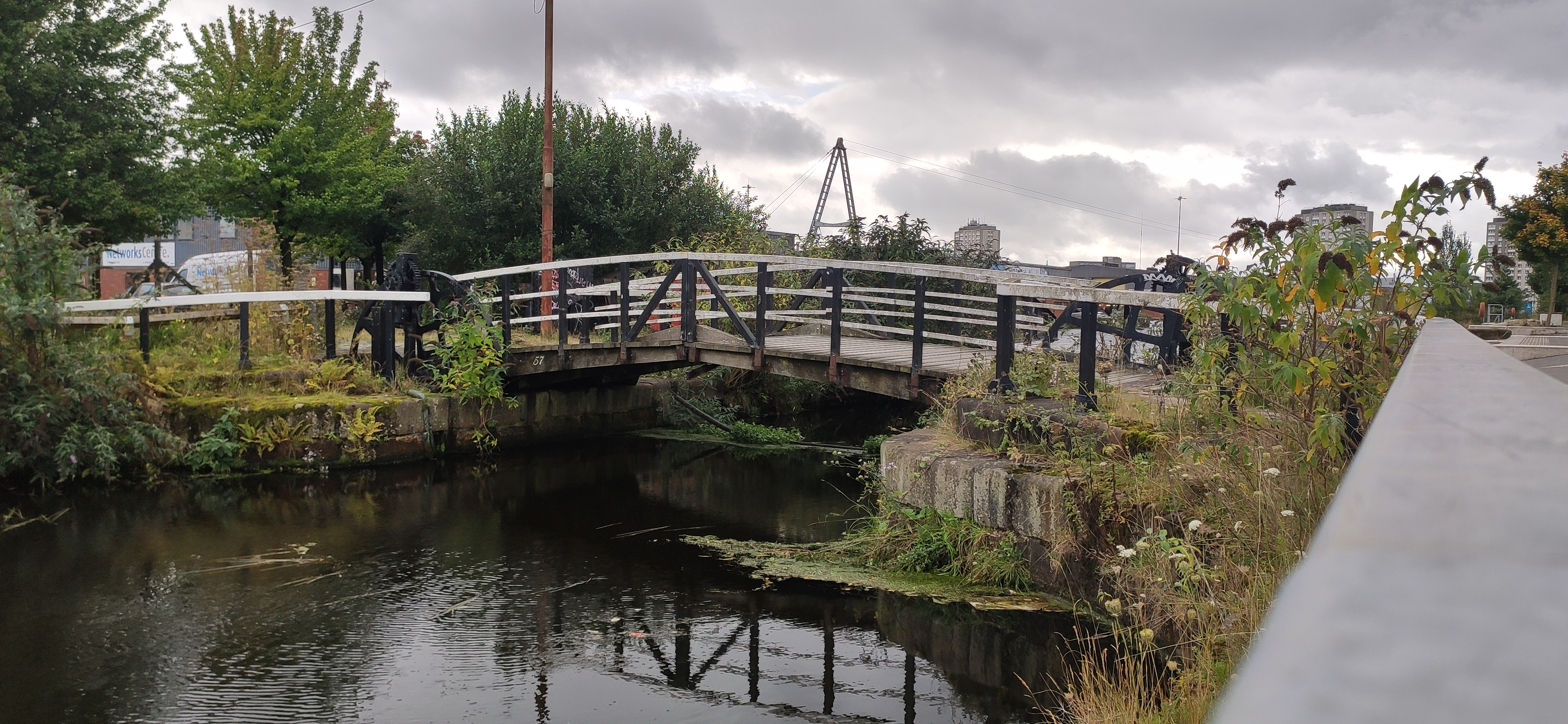
- The bridge viewed from the east
- Coordinates: 55°52′20.17″N 4°15′4.17″W
- Crosses: Forth and Clyde Canal
- Locale: Glasgow

Characteristics
- Design: Bascule
- No. of spans: 1

History
- Inaugurated: Early 1800s

Listed Building – Category B
- Official name: Midwharf Street And North Canalbank Street, Forth And Clyde Canal, Bascule Bridge Including Stone Platforms/abutments
- Designated: 17 February 1992
- Reference no.: LB33617

Scheduled monument
- Official name: Forth and Clyde Canal, Port Dundas canal basin, Glasgow
- Designated: 27 April 1999
- Reference no.: SM6689

Location
- Interactive map of Port Dundas bascule bridge

Port Dundas bascule bridge is a bridge on the Forth and Clyde canal in Glasgow, Scotland.

The bridge is a Category B listed building and is part of the Port Dundas basin which has been a scheduled monument since 1999.

The bridge was constructed in the early 19th century and is now the last operational Bascule bridge on the canal. It consists of two wooden leaves, joined to hollow stone piers which contain balancing weights, and has hand operated cast iron gear.

== See also ==
- List of bridges in Scotland
