= List of listed buildings in Glasgow/11 =

This is a list of listed buildings in Glasgow, Scotland.

== List ==
Name	Location	Date Listed	Grid Ref. (Note: Sometimes known as OSGB36, the grid reference (where provided) is based on the British national grid reference system used by the Ordnance Survey. • "Guide to National Grid". Ordnance Survey. • "Get-a-map". Ordnance Survey.)	Geo-coordinates	Notes	LB Number (Note: Historic Environment Scotland assign a unique alphanumeric identifier to each designated site in Scotland, for listed buildings this always begins with "LB", for example "LB12345".)	Image
Queen Margaret Drive, Queen Margaret Bridge				55°52′46″N 4°17′11″W	Category B	32577	Upload Photo
8 And 8A Sydenham Road, (Newhall), With Terraces And Gatepiers				55°52′43″N 4°18′12″W	Category B	32587	Upload Photo
5 Victoria Circus, (Elstow)				55°52′43″N 4°18′01″W	Category B	32590	Upload Photo
43 Victoria Crescent Road And Walls				55°52′35″N 4°17′54″W	Category B	32597	Upload Photo
40 Kingsborough Gardens				55°52′43″N 4°18′15″W	Category B	32545	Upload Photo
Kirklee Road Kirklee Bridge				55°52′57″N 4°17′24″W	Category B	32549	Upload Photo
8 Lowther Terrace, Great Western Road				55°52′53″N 4°17′55″W	Category B	32562	Upload Photo
9 Lowther Terrace, Great Western Road				55°52′53″N 4°17′56″W	Category A	32563	Upload another image
2 Mirrlees Drive				55°52′58″N 4°17′47″W	Category B	32568	Upload Photo
2 Prince Albert Road, (Holmhurst)				55°52′39″N 4°18′05″W	Category B	32572	Upload Photo
1 Horselethill Road, (Marleybank House)				55°52′42″N 4°17′45″W	Category B	32524	Upload another image
79 Hyndland Road, Hyndland Parish Church, Church Of Scotland				55°52′45″N 4°18′19″W	Category A	32532	Upload Photo
5 And 5B Cleveden Gardens And Gatepiers				55°53′05″N 4°18′05″W	Category B	32485	Upload Photo
2-8 (Even Nos) Crown Road North With 68 Dowanside Road And 2A-6A (Even Nos) Kinnoul Lane				55°52′35″N 4°18′00″W	Category B	32491	Upload another image
1 Queen Mary Avenue				55°50′01″N 4°15′48″W	Category B	32438	Upload another image See more images
34 Queen's Drive, Southfield, Including Gatepiers				55°49′54″N 4°15′38″W	Category C(S)	32449	Upload another image See more images
452-462 (Even Nos) Victoria Road/Prince Edward Street				55°50′09″N 4°15′55″W	Category C(S)	32465	Upload another image See more images
734-752 (Even Nos) Pollokshaws Road And 2-16 (Even Nos) Nithsdale Road				55°50′12″N 4°16′13″W	Category B	32402	Upload another image See more images
2 Sinclair Drive And Battlefield Road, Langside Public Library				55°49′37″N 4°16′04″W	Category B	32412	Upload another image See more images
62 Albert Road And 327 Langside Road Including The Albert				55°50′02″N 4°15′47″W	Category C(S)	32419	Upload another image See more images
82 Albert Road				55°50′01″N 4°15′43″W	Category B	32420	Upload another image See more images
15 Shakespeare Street, Ruchill Parish Church, (Church Of Scotland)				55°53′12″N 4°17′00″W	Category B	32355	Upload another image
Marywood Square Lamp Standard In Front Of No 45				55°50′09″N 4°16′33″W	Category B	32379	Upload Photo
295 Southbrae Drive, Formerly 523 Anniesland Road, Tower Dene				55°53′07″N 4°20′57″W	Category C(S)	32299	Upload Photo
1091 Great Western Road, 2 Whittingehame Gardens				55°53′10″N 4°18′54″W	Category C(S)	32323	Upload Photo
1095 Great Western Road, 4 Whittingehame Garden				55°53′11″N 4°18′57″W	Category B	32325	Upload Photo
1544 Great Western Road, Formerly County Bingo Hall And Ascot Cinema				55°53′21″N 4°19′16″W	Category B	32337	Upload another image
14-18 (Even Nos) Westend Park Street				55°52′12″N 4°16′29″W	Category B	32254	Upload another image
25 Lynedoch Street				55°52′06″N 4°16′31″W	Category B	32227	Upload another image
Great Western Road Bridge Over River Kelvin				55°52′29″N 4°16′47″W	Category A	32197	Upload another image
31 And 32 Lansdowne Crescent And 401 North Woodside Road				55°52′30″N 4°16′38″W	Category C(S)	32217	Upload Photo
340-342 (Even Nos) Cathedral Street, The Christian Centre				55°51′48″N 4°14′55″W	Category C(S)	46517	Upload Photo
58 Port Dundas Road, Buchanan House, Locomotion Statue				55°52′01″N 4°15′15″W	Category C(S)	47411	Upload Photo
28-40 (Even Nos) Union Street				55°51′32″N 4°15′23″W	Category B	49900	Upload Photo
Partick Bridge Street, St Simon's Roman Catholic Church And Presbytery				55°52′10″N 4°17′57″W	Category B	49910	Upload another image
74 And 76 Netherlee Road, Braehead Villa, Including Gatepiers And Boundary Walls				55°48′47″N 4°15′37″W	Category B	50033	Upload Photo
35 Inchlee Street, 15, 16 Victoria Park Drive South Former Whiteinch Burgh Hall, Former Police Station And Former Fire Station Including Boundary Wall, Gatepiers And Railings				55°52′28″N 4°20′03″W	Category B	50283	Upload another image
304-332 (Even Nos) Sauchiehall Street, Former Abc Regal Cinema, The O2				55°51′57″N 4°15′51″W	Category C(S)	51547	Upload Photo
23-25 (Odd Nos) Belmont Street And 27 And 31 Lacrosse Terrace				55°52′38″N 4°16′50″W	Category B	44935	Upload Photo
61 Cleveden Drive And Cleveden Crescent Lane, Gatepiers, Boundary And Retaining Walls				55°53′06″N 4°18′23″W	Category B	44594	Upload Photo
5 Bridge Street And 15 Carlton Court, Cumbrae House				55°51′15″N 4°15′28″W	Category B	44041	Upload Photo
197 Nithsdale Road				55°50′28″N 4°17′10″W	Category B	43903	Upload Photo
165 Castlebank Street, Scotway House				55°52′04″N 4°18′30″W	Category B	43569	Upload Photo
Linkwood Crescent, Campbell Colquhoun Burial Ground				55°54′39″N 4°21′59″W	Category B	43030	Upload Photo
436 Kinfauns Drive, Kinfauns Centre, Former Church Of Jesus Christ Of The Latter Day Saints				55°54′48″N 4°21′22″W	Category B	43032	Upload Photo
1114 Pollokshaws Road And 7 Moss-Side Road, Shawlands Cross Church And Hall				55°49′50″N 4°16′55″W	Category B	33956	Upload another image
12, 14 Regwood Street And Deanston Drive, South Shawlands Church And Halls				55°49′32″N 4°17′06″W	Category B	33961	Upload Photo
120 Sydney Street/Wellpark Street, Wellpark Occupational Centre				55°51′30″N 4°13′48″W	Category B	33907	Upload Photo
Kilmarnock Road, Macquisten Bridge				55°49′30″N 4°17′10″W	Category C(S)	33925	Upload Photo
10, 12 Kilmarnock Road And 1155 Pollokshaws Road, Including The Granary, Crossmyloof Mansions				55°49′48″N 4°16′55″W	Category B	33927	Upload another image
5 Mansewood Road, Eastwood Parish Church, Church Of Scotland				55°49′03″N 4°18′05″W	Category B	33938	Upload another image
1 Saltmarket, Glasgow Cross The Mercat Cross				55°51′23″N 4°14′37″W	Category B	33856	Upload another image
46 Keppochill Road, 1, 11 Millarbank Street Sports Centre, Formerly Springburn Public Halls				55°52′48″N 4°14′06″W	Category B	33877	Upload another image
99 Abercromby Street, St Mary's Rc Church				55°51′14″N 4°13′37″W	Category A	33810	Upload another image
120 Carstairs Street, Former Strathclyde Public School				55°50′21″N 4°13′18″W	Category C(S)	33822	Upload Photo
100 Duke Street, 1 And 3 Duke Wynd, Former Great Eastern Hotel				55°51′34″N 4°14′03″W	Category B	33828	Upload Photo
15 Clarendon Street				55°52′23″N 4°16′07″W	Category B	33756	Upload Photo
870 Garscube Road, Queens Cross Church And Hall (Formerly St Cuthberts And Queens Cross)				55°52′49″N 4°16′19″W	Category A	33764	Upload another image
74 And 76 Hopehill Road, St Columba Of Iona Rc Church And Presbytery, Retaining Wall And Gates				55°52′35″N 4°16′00″W	Category A	33765	Upload another image See more images
75 Hotspur Street, Shakespeare Primary School, Gatepiers, Gates And Railings (Formerly Garrioch School)				55°52′59″N 4°17′10″W	Category B	33766	Upload Photo
71-79 (Odd Nos) Queen Margaret Drive				55°52′49″N 4°17′06″W	Category C(S)	33777	Upload Photo
65 Wilton Street				55°52′41″N 4°16′27″W	Category C(S)	33783	Upload Photo
325 Carmunnock Road, King's Park, Aikenhead House				55°48′55″N 4°14′30″W	Category A	33708	Upload Photo
318 Croftpark Avenue, Crofthill Road, Croftfoot Parish Church (Church Of Scotland), Hall, Gates And Railings				55°48′53″N 4°13′55″W	Category B	33714	Upload Photo
59 Machrie Road, Barlia Terrace, Castlemilk House Stables				55°48′29″N 4°13′18″W	Category B	33720	Upload Photo
38, 40 Snuffmill Road, Lindsay Tenement				55°48′50″N 4°15′32″W	Category B	33726	Upload Photo
101, 103 Inzievar Terrace, Carmyle, St Joachim's Roman Catholic Church And Presbytery				55°50′05″N 4°09′14″W	Category C(S)	33670	Upload Photo
513 Cathcart Road, 283 Calder Street, Candlish Polmadie Church Including Hall				55°50′13″N 4°15′24″W	Category B	33687	Upload Photo
197 Crookston Road, Ross Hall Park, Chimney Stalk At Walled Garden				55°50′23″N 4°21′47″W	Category B	33592	Upload Photo
1647 Paisley Road West, Nazareth House Including Chapel				55°50′43″N 4°20′16″W	Category C(S)	33602	Upload Photo
1435 Gallowgate And Duke Street				55°51′05″N 4°11′52″W	Category B	33632	Upload another image
534 Paisley Road West, Former Ibrox Methodist Church				55°51′03″N 4°18′19″W	Category B	33582	Upload Photo
17 Sherbrooke Avenue 44 Hamilton Avenue, Sherbrooke House, Including Boundary Walls, Gates And Gatepiers				55°50′31″N 4°17′54″W	Category B	33469	Upload Photo
21 Sherbrooke Avenue, Balmory, Including Boundary Walls And Gatepiers				55°50′28″N 4°17′55″W	Category B	33470	Upload Photo
42 Sherbrooke Avenue And Springkell Avenue, Redhills, Including Gatepiers And Boundary Walls				55°50′21″N 4°18′02″W	Category B	33476	Upload Photo
525-529 (Odd Nos) Shields Road And Albert Drive, War Memorial Within Enclosure Of Pollokshields Church (C Of S)				55°50′35″N 4°16′34″W	Category B	33478	Upload another image See more images
9, 11 Hamilton Avenue, Including Boundary Walls And Gatepiers				55°50′25″N 4°17′34″W	Category B	33413	Upload Photo
1 And 1A Leslie Road Belhaven Including Boundary Walls Gates And Gatepiers				55°50′28″N 4°16′39″W	Category B	33416	Upload Photo
43, 43A And 43B Maxwell Drive Including Boundary Walls And Gatepiers				55°50′44″N 4°17′21″W	Category B	33425	Upload Photo
227 Nithsdale Road, Including Boundary Walls And Gatepiers				55°50′34″N 4°17′32″W	Category C(S)	33441	Upload Photo
240 Nithsdale Road, Sherbrooke St Gilbert's Church And Hall				55°50′39″N 4°17′56″W	Category B	33453	Upload another image
Carmunnock, 22 Kirk Road				55°47′24″N 4°14′08″W	Category B	33323	Upload Photo
Carmunnock, 26 And 28 Kirk Road				55°47′24″N 4°14′09″W	Category C(S)	33325	Upload Photo
Carmunnock, 32 Kirk Road Brae House				55°47′23″N 4°14′09″W	Category C(S)	33326	Upload Photo
Carmunnock, 145 Waterside Road				55°47′18″N 4°14′04″W	Category C(S)	33330	Upload Photo
20 Linn Park, Linn Park House				55°48′18″N 4°15′42″W	Category B	33334	Upload Photo
638-646 (Even Nos) Govan Road, 3 Napier Street, Napier House				55°51′41″N 4°18′21″W	Category B	33348	Upload Photo
62, 64 Langlands Road And Return Elevation To Roseneath Street, St Anthony's Rc Presbytery				55°51′47″N 4°18′54″W	Category C(S)	33359	Upload Photo
25 Albert Drive And 522 Pollokshaws Road, Tramway				55°50′26″N 4°16′02″W	Category B	33365	Upload another image
361 And 361A Albert Drive, The Laurels, Including Boundary Walls And Gatepiers				55°50′38″N 4°17′32″W	Category C(S)	33372	Upload Photo
194-198 (Even Nos) Albert Drive And 143-147 (Odd Nos) Kenmure Street				55°50′32″N 4°16′21″W	Category B	33377	Upload Photo
8 Bruce Road, Including Boundary Walls And Gatepiers				55°50′39″N 4°16′40″W	Category C(S)	33390	Upload Photo
92, 98 West George Street				55°51′44″N 4°15′19″W	Category B	33236	Upload Photo
158, 160 West George Street 150 Hope Street And West Regent Lane				55°51′46″N 4°15′27″W	Category B	33243	Upload Photo
196, 198 West George Street And 118 Wellington Street				55°51′46″N 4°15′33″W	Category A	33246	Upload Photo
230-248 (Even Nos) West George Street				55°51′47″N 4°15′42″W	Category B	33248	Upload Photo
9, 11, 13 West Graham Street				55°52′05″N 4°15′41″W	Category B	33251	Upload Photo
99-105 (Odd Nos) West Nile Street				55°51′48″N 4°15′17″W	Category B	33252	Upload Photo
88 West Regent Street And 168 Hope Street				55°51′48″N 4°15′27″W	Category C(S)	33271	Upload Photo
188 West Regent Street And 116 And 116A Blythswood Street				55°51′50″N 4°15′43″W	Category B	33280	Upload Photo
100 Belmont Road, Mosesfield House				55°53′30″N 4°13′40″W	Category B	33292	Upload Photo
52 Broomfield Road, Balgray Tower				55°53′14″N 4°13′46″W	Category B	33293	Upload Photo
Elder Park, Fragments Of Linthouse Mansion				55°51′48″N 4°19′37″W	Category B	33303	Upload Photo
545-557 (Odd Nos) Sauchiehall Street				55°51′58″N 4°16′23″W	Category B	33183	Upload Photo
45 Scott Street And 71 Buccleuch Street, Garnethill Convent Nursery School				55°52′03″N 4°15′51″W	Category B	33201	Upload Photo
78-82 (Even Nos) Union Street				55°51′35″N 4°15′23″W	Category B	33207	Upload Photo
133-137 (Odd Nos) West George Street And 39-45 (Odd Nos) Renfield Street, Pearl Assurance Buildings				55°51′44″N 4°15′24″W	Category B	33224	Upload Photo
129 St Vincent Street				55°51′41″N 4°15′32″W	Category B	33141	Upload Photo
96 St Vincent Street				55°51′42″N 4°15′22″W	Category B	33154	Upload Photo
122-128 (Even Nos) St Vincent Street				55°51′43″N 4°15′27″W	Category B	33157	Upload Photo
242 St Vincent Street, Royal College Of Physicians				55°51′45″N 4°15′49″W	Category B	33165	Upload another image
300 St Vincent Street, St Columba's (Gaelic) Parish Church, Church Of Scotland				55°51′47″N 4°16′00″W	Category B	33168	Upload another image See more images
235 Sauchiehall Street, 147 Blythswood Street, Bank Of Scotland				55°51′54″N 4°15′44″W	Category B	33175	Upload another image
78-94 (Even Nos) Mitchell Street, 10, 14 And Gordon Public House, Mitchell Lane And 17-19 (Odd Nos) Gordon Lane, Gordon Chambers				55°51′36″N 4°15′19″W	Category B	33088	Upload another image
188 Pitt Street, And 209 Bath Street, Adelaide Place Baptist Church				55°51′53″N 4°15′52″W	Category B	33097	Upload Photo
71-79 (Odd Nos) Renfield Street With 48-50 (Even Nos) West Regent Street				55°51′48″N 4°15′23″W	Category B	33102	Upload Photo
23-27 (Odd Nos) Gordon Street And 96-100 (Even Nos) Mitchell Street				55°51′37″N 4°15′19″W	Category B	33027	Upload Photo
29-35 (Odd Nos) Gordon Street 101 Mitchell Street				55°51′37″N 4°15′22″W	Category B	33028	Upload Photo
129 Hill Street And 29 Garnet Street, Hill Street Synagogue				55°52′02″N 4°16′04″W	Category A	33040	Upload another image See more images
36 Jamaica Street And 10 Midland Street Gardner's				55°51′27″N 4°15′27″W	Category A	33065	Upload Photo
Kelvinway Bridge Over Kelvin				55°52′05″N 4°17′15″W	Category B	33076	Upload another image
335 Bath Street And Elmbank Street, King's Theatre				55°51′54″N 4°16′07″W	Category A	32963	Upload another image
39-69 (Odd Nos) Bothwell Street, Mercantile Chambers				55°51′40″N 4°15′40″W	Category A	32980	Upload another image
75 And 77 Bothwell Street				55°51′40″N 4°15′42″W	Category B	32981	Upload Photo
No 4 Clairmont Gardens				55°52′00″N 4°16′38″W	Category A	33008	Upload Photo
286 Clyde Street And 1-5 (Odd Nos) Dixon Street				55°51′23″N 4°15′22″W	Category B	33011	Upload Photo
1125 And 1129 Argyle Street				55°51′53″N 4°17′04″W	Category C(S)	32944	Upload Photo
10 Partickhill Road, St Kentigern's Hostel (Front Building Only)				55°52′27″N 4°18′12″W	Category B	32893	Upload Photo
67 And 69 Partickhill Road				55°52′30″N 4°18′37″W	Category B	32896	Upload Photo
72 Peel Street,				55°52′27″N 4°18′38″W	Category B	32900	Upload Photo
42 Bute Gardens, Lilybank House				55°52′27″N 4°17′25″W	Category A	32853	Upload another image
15, 21 Cecil Street, Hillhead Primary School				55°52′34″N 4°17′14″W	Category B	32855	Upload Photo
731 Great Western Road Bible Training Institute				55°52′39″N 4°17′23″W	Category B	32872	Upload Photo
89 Wilson Street With 52 Virginia Street				55°51′31″N 4°14′59″W	Category B	32806	Upload Photo
38 Parnie Street Tron Theatre, (Former Tron Kirk) And Curtain Wall And Railings To Chisholm Street				55°51′24″N 4°14′45″W	Category A	32812	Upload another image
212 Saltmarket Justiciary Courts With Flank To Clyde Street				55°51′13″N 4°14′49″W	Category A	32844	Upload another image
47 Anderson Street, 23 Gullane Street, Partick Police Station				55°52′11″N 4°18′19″W	Category B	32845	Upload another image
159-161 (Odd Nos) Ingram Street With 103 Hutcheson Street				55°51′35″N 4°14′53″W	Category B	32733	Upload Photo
103 Trongate				55°51′25″N 4°14′49″W	Category B	32773	Upload Photo
137 Trongate				55°51′25″N 4°14′52″W	Category B	32775	Upload Photo
33 Turnbull Street, Former Church Of St Andrew By The Green				55°51′15″N 4°14′39″W	Category A	32790	Upload another image
28-32 (Even Nos) Cathedral Square, John Knox Street, Cathedral House Hotel With Gatepiers And Gate				55°51′43″N 4°14′06″W	Category B	32653	Upload another image
Cathedral Square, Statue Of James Lumsden				55°51′47″N 4°14′09″W	Category B	32658	Upload another image
72 Charlotte Street, Former Lady And St Francis Secondary School				55°51′13″N 4°14′29″W	Category A	32662	Upload another image See more images
72 Clyde Street, Bridgegate, Merchants Steeple, Now Enclosed Within The Briggait				55°51′17″N 4°14′57″W	Category A	32665	Upload Photo
51-53 (Odd Nos) Cochrane Street				55°51′37″N 4°14′55″W	Category B	32673	Upload Photo
3-7 (Odd Nos) Dundas Street				55°51′44″N 4°15′09″W	Category B	32679	Upload Photo
1 George Square, 192-208 (Even Nos) Ingram Street, 4 Hanover Street, And 3 And 5 South Frederick Street, Former General Post Office				55°51′37″N 4°15′00″W	Category A	32685	Upload another image
204 George Street, University Of Strathclyde, (Former Royal College Of Science And Technology)				55°51′41″N 4°14′48″W	Category B	32708	Upload Photo
61-65 (Odd Nos) Glassford Street				55°51′32″N 4°14′57″W	Category B	32712	Upload Photo

== Key ==
The scheme for classifying buildings in Scotland is:

- Category A: "buildings of national or international importance, either architectural or historic; or fine, little-altered examples of some particular period, style or building type."
- Category B: "buildings of regional or more than local importance; or major examples of some particular period, style or building type, which may have been altered."
- Category C: "buildings of local importance; lesser examples of any period, style, or building type, as originally constructed or moderately altered; and simple traditional buildings which group well with other listed buildings."

In March 2016 there were 47,288 listed buildings in Scotland. Of these, 8% were Category A, and 50% were Category B, with the remaining 42% being Category C.

== See also ==
- List of listed buildings in Glasgow
