= Partick Burgh Hall =

Municipal building in Partick, Scotland

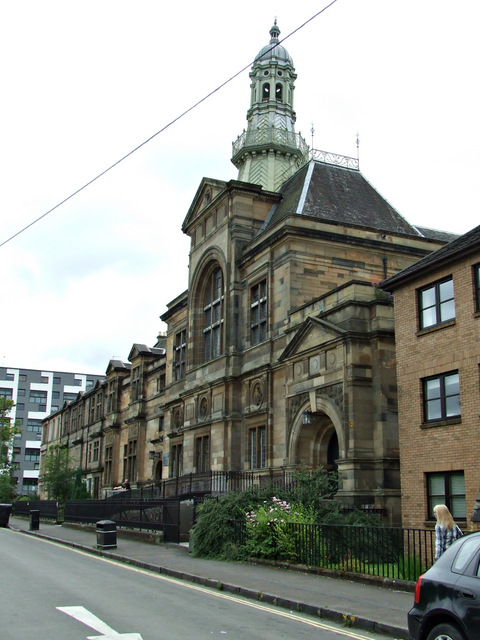
- Partick Burgh Hall

- Shown in Glasgow
- 55.8713°N 4.3085°W
- Location: Burgh Hall Street, Partick

History
- Built: 1872

Site notes
- Architect: William Leiper
- Architectural style: French Renaissance style

Listed Building – Category B
- Designated: 15 December 1970
- Reference no.: LB32852

Partick Burgh Hall is a municipal facility in Burgh Hall Street, Partick, Scotland. The hall, which was the headquarters of Partick Burgh Council in the early 20th century, is a Category B listed building.

== History ==
The building was commissioned to replace the old burgh hall which had been completed in 1853. After a period of rapid population expansion associated with the growth in the shipbuilding industry, civic leaders decided to procure a purpose-built burgh hall: the site selected was the southern section of piece of open ground, the rest of which was developed at the same time as Hamilton Crescent, the home of the West of Scotland Cricket Club.

The new building, which was designed by William Leiper in the French Renaissance style, was completed in 1872. The design involved an asymmetrical main frontage with thirteen bays facing Burgh Hall Street; the western section of five bays, the middle three of which projected slightly forward, formed the main frontispiece; there were windows in the middle three bays on the ground floor with an arched doorway in the western bay; there were panels carved by John Mossman depicting compassion, truth and justice above the ground floor windows and a large round-headed window in the middle bay on the first floor with a pediment above; there was also an ornate bell tower at roof level.

The burgh hall was the headquarters of Partick Burgh Council until the burgh was annexed by Glasgow in 1912. A comprehensive refurbishment of the hall costing £800,000 was carried out a design by ZM Architecture and completed in 2004; the work, which involved the creation of a 10 metres (33 ft) high foyer giving access to all three of the main halls as well as the restoration to the stained glass windows, was commended at the Scottish Design Awards in 2004.

In June 2019 it was announced that the hall, which continues to function as a community centre, would also become a "Space for Growth Hub" providing support for start-up businesses.

== See also ==
- List of listed buildings in Glasgow/6
