= Outline of Glasgow =

Most populous city in Scotland

The following is an outline and topical guide of Glasgow:

Glasgow is the most populous city in Scotland, located on the banks of the River Clyde in west central Scotland.

Flag of Glasgow City Council

Coat of arms of Glasgow City Council

== General reference ==
- Common English name(s):
  - Glasgow
- Common names in other languages:
  - Glaschu (Scottish Gaelic)
  - Glesga (Scots)
- Nicknames
  - "The Dear Green Place"
- Languages:
- English
- Scottish Gaelic
- Scots
- Demonym:
  - Glaswegian

== Geography of Glasgow ==
- Population:
  - 622,820 (Council area)
  - 632,350 (Locality)
  - 1,028,220 (Settlement)
  - 1,861,315 (Metropolitan area)
- Area:
  - 68 sq mi (175 km2) (Council Area)
  - 142.3 sq mi (368.5 km2) (Urban area)
  - 190 sq mi (492 km2) (Metropolitan area)

=== Location ===
- Northern Hemisphere, Eastern Hemisphere
  - Europe
    - Northwestern Europe
      - Great Britain
        - United Kingdom
          - Scotland

=== Parks and gardens ===
- Alexandra Park
- Glasgow Green
- Linn Park
- Queen's Park
- Victoria Park
- Kelvingrove Park

== Government and politics of Glasgow ==
=== Glasgow in Scottish Parliament elections ===
- 1999
- 2003
- 2007
- 2011
- 2016
- 2021

=== Glasgow parliamentary constituencies ===
==== Westminster constituencies ====
- Glasgow Central
- Glasgow East
- Glasgow North
- Glasgow North East
- Glasgow North West
- Glasgow South
- Glasgow South West

==== Holyrood constituencies ====
===== Current (since 2011) =====
  - Glasgow Anniesland
  - Glasgow Cathcart
  - Glasgow Kelvin
  - Glasgow Maryhill and Springburn
  - Glasgow Pollok
  - Glasgow Provan
  - Glasgow Shettleston
  - Glasgow Southside

===== Historic (1999 to 2007) =====
  - Glasgow Baillieston
  - Glasgow Govan
  - Glasgow Maryhill
  - Glasgow Springburn
  - Glasgow Rutherglen

== Culture of Glasgow ==
- Architecture of Glasgow
- Glasgow art

=== Cinema of Glasgow ===
- Glasgow Film Festival

=== Religion in Glasgow ===
- Sectarianism in Glasgow

==== Archdioceses and dioceses ====
- Diocese of Glasgow and Galloway
- Roman Catholic Archdiocese of Glasgow

===== Historical archdioceses and dioceses =====
- Archdiocese of Glasgow

== Transportation in Glasgow ==
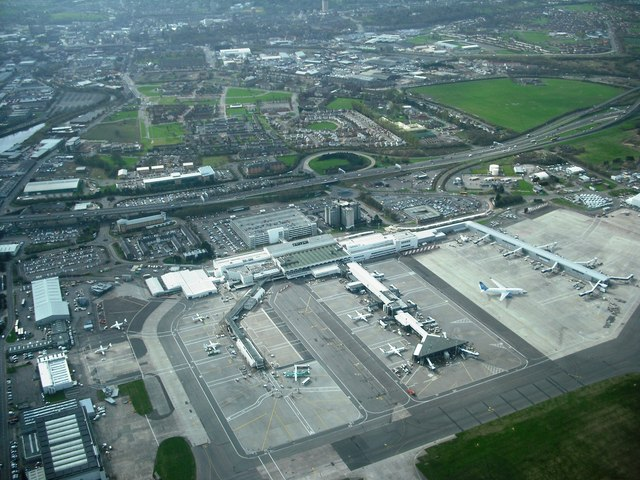
View of Glasgow International Airport from the air

=== Airports ===
- Glasgow Airport (Note: Also known as Glasgow International Airport)
- Glasgow Prestwick Airport

=== Motorway network ===
- M73
- M74
- M77
- M8
- M80
- M898

=== Roads ===
- A8
- A74
- A77
- A80
- A81
- A89
- A82
- A724
- A725
- A726
- A727
- A728
- A730
- A736
- A737
- A739
- A749
- A761
- A803
- A804
- A814
- A879

== Education in Glasgow ==
=== Universities ===
- Glasgow Caledonian University
- University of Glasgow
- University of Strathclyde

== See also ==
- Outline of Scotland
- Outline of the United Kingdom
