= Shawfield F.C. =

Association football club in Glasgow City, Scotland

Shawfield
- Full name: Shawfield Football Club
- Founded: 1918
- Dissolved: 1960
- Ground: Rosebery Park; Glasgow
- League: Glasgow Junior League; 1921–1927; Scottish Intermediate League; 1927–31; Central Junior League; 1931–60

Shawfield Football Club was a Scottish football team that competed in the Junior set-up and won the Scottish Junior Cup in 1946–47. There are also a number of references to them being called Shawfield Juniors.

== History ==
Shawfield was founded in 1918 and disbanded in 1960. Their home ground was Rosebery Park, located in the Oatlands area of Glasgow – this is close to, but not within, the Shawfield district of the town of Rutherglen which includes Shawfield Stadium.

The club's first season in the Glasgow Junior League was in 1921–22. They remained a mid-table finishing side through five seasons in that league and four in its successor competition, the Scottish Intermediate League.

In 1931–32, the first season of the next reorganisation — the Central Junior League — Shawfield won the championship, beating Yoker Athletic in the deciding match. In 1937, they were overall runners-up to Arthurlie, but in 1944 they finished dead last, only improving by one place the following year. They were bottom again in 1954, but generally were a middle-ranking club up to their last season, 1959–60.

In the knockout competitions, Shawfield lost the 1939 Scottish Junior Cup final by 2–1 to neighbours Rutherglen Glencairn (whose ground was in Shawfield itself) in the final at Celtic Park, watched by 22,363 although they gained some consolation that year by winning the West of Scotland Cup in a 2–0 victory over Clydebank Juniors. They got their hands on the biggest prize of the Junior grade in 1947, defeating Bo'ness United in the Scottish Cup Final at Hampden Park, The first match before a crowd of 56,410 finished 1–1; the replay drew 26,521 with Shawfield prevailing 2–1. Bo’ness would go on to lift the trophy the following year. One of Shawfield's players, Tommy Farrell, played in both the 1939 and 1947 finals either side of World War II.

The club disbanded in 1960, having lost much of their local base for players and supporters – Glasgow's housing improvement programme was in full swing, with much of the population of the crowded, substandard tenements decanted to new overspill estates on the edge of town – for residents of the areas surrounding Rosebery Park like Oatlands, Hutchesontown, Gorbals and Polmadie this typically meant Castlemilk and Pollok, although no new Junior teams were established in these vast schemes (Pollok F.C. are not based in the residential district of that name). Shawfield were only the first Junior club in that part of the city to fold, followed by Bridgeton Waverley (1962), Parkhead (1963), Strathclyde (1965) and Dennistoun Waverley (1968). Clyde also suffered from a diminishing fanbase and would leave the area in the 1980s.

== Former players ==
See: Category:Shawfield F.C. players

The Post-war Scottish internationals that had played for Shawfield were Bobby Dougan and Frank McLintock.

== Honours ==
List of Shawfield honours;

- Scottish Junior Cup: 1946–47
  - Runners-up: 1938–39
- Central Junior League: 1931–32
  - Runners-up: 1936–37
- West of Scotland Junior Cup: 1938–39
- Glasgow Junior League Cup: 1925–26
- Glasgow Junior Cup: 1931–32, 1938–39
- North Eastern Junior Cup: 1923–24, 1935–36, 1946–47
- Glasgow Junior Charity Cup: 1933–34
- Glasgow Eastern Charity Cup: 1933–34, 1950–51
- Smyllum Charity Cup: 1931–32, 1932–33
- Elder Cottage Hospital Cup: 1926–27
