= Metal Bridge =

Metal Bridge may refer to:

- Metal Bridge, Cumbria
- Metal Bridge, County Durham
- Bridges that are made out of metal
