= A728 road =

Road in Scotland

Coordinates: 55.8553°N 4.2037°W

A728

Route information
- Length: 4.0 mi (6.4 km)

Major junctions
- South end: Oatlands / King's Park
- North end: Parkhead / Gorbals

Location
- Country: United Kingdom
- Constituent country: Scotland

Road network
- Roads in the United Kingdom; Motorways; A and B road zones
← A727	→ A730

The A728 is a route number in Glasgow, Scotland applied to two connected roads.

The eastern branch, known as the Glasgow East End Regeneration Route runs from Polmadie to the Forge Shopping Centre in Camlachie in the east of the city. The first phase was opened in 2011 with the second phase opened in mid-2012; these two phases are officially known as the A728 Clyde Gateway. An extension to junction 13 of the M8, which is also the terminus of the M80, was planned as well, for construction in 2018. After delay, it was scrapped in 2021 due to climate concerns.

The western branch of the route runs from the Albert Bridge near the city centre, where it meets the A8 and A74, and converges with the other branch near Toryglen Park in Polmadie. Both branches continue along the same road south towards King's Park.

== Eastern branch ==
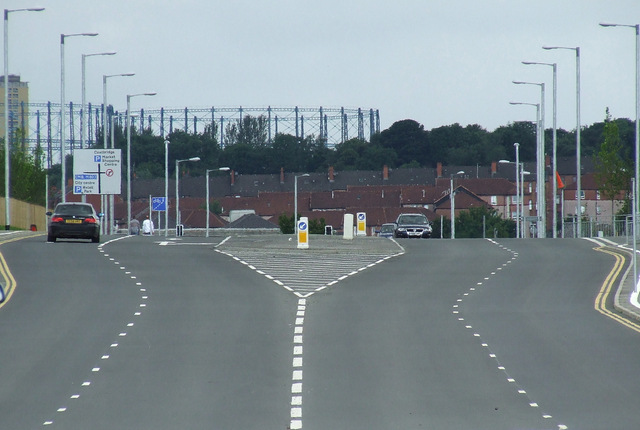
2012 view of the newly-opened Glasgow East End Regeneration Route from its junction with the A74 (London Road) looking northwards towards Gallowgate (with the Provan Gas Works beyond)

=== Inner Ring Road plans ===
The history of the route goes back to the Glasgow Inner Ring Road (IRR) project of the 1960s. Owing largely to public opposition, only the northern and western flanks of this were ever built (this is now the central section of the M8). With the resultant chronic traffic congestion on the M8, only in 2011 was the southern flank, the M74 Completion, finally opened after much local opposition. The construction of the EERR link is intended to provide an 'inner circle' connecting the new section of M74 at Polmadie Road with the M8 at Provan.

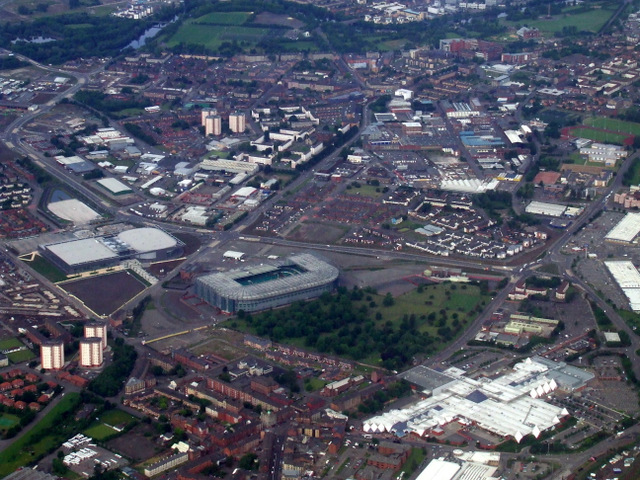
2012 aerial view of the road's route from the east, from the point of it crossing the River Clyde at Rutherglen Bridge (top left), running through Dalmarnock, passing Celtic Park and terminating north of Parkhead at Duke Street (bottom right)

The route of the EERR was planned as early as 1965 by the then Glasgow Corporation after the Glasgow Inner Ring Road proposals originating from the Bruce Report, and was originally a continuation of the Stirling Motorway (which would be realised as the M80) which would have run directly south beyond the interchange with the Monkland Motorway (the present-day M8) at Provan Gas Works. This road would have driven south towards the extended South Link Motorway (now the M74) and would have served as an "outer ring" for the city. As the appetite for further inner urban motorway developments waned in the 1970s following the backlash when the city centre section of the IRR was built in the late 1960s, the route evolved into an urban thoroughfare instead.

=== 1990s - 2012: Parkhead Bypass and Clyde Gateway Phase 1 & 2 ===
The M80, when eventually built in the early 1990s, now terminated at the Provan Gas Works interchange, whilst the Parkhead bypass, constructed in 1988 as part of the Parkhead Forge shopping development, was effectively the first section of the EERR. From Parkhead, the road would cut northward, through Hogarth Park, a former railway embankment now used as public open space. The new road would run between Haghill and Carntyne, under Edinburgh Road and Cumbernauld Road continuing along the old Caledonian Railway "Switchback" line to the M8/M80 junction at Provan.

A planning application was submitted for the southern section of the EERR, named the Clyde Gateway, in October 2005, but the winning of Host City for the 2014 Commonwealth Games provided the necessary impetus. Phase 1, from junction 1A of the now-completed M74 extension Polmadie Road to Shawfield opened in April 2007 as part of the Oatlands development. Phase 2 was completed in April 2012 and designated as the A728. It passes Shawfield Stadium, over the River Clyde at Rutherglen Bridge and past Dalmarnock railway station (where it meets the A749), before linking up with the Parkhead bypass (A74) and the new stadia district (Celtic Park and the Sir Chris Hoy Velodrome), joining the existing road network at the Forge Retail Park.

=== 2016 - present: Clyde Gateway Phase 3 ===
Construction of phase 3, linking north from the A89 Parkhead Bypass to the M8 at Provan along a disused railway line, was planned to commence after the 2014 Commonwealth Games. In January 2016, Glasgow City Council approved the construction of this 0.9 miles (1.4 km) phase with works then expected to start in 2018 and to be complete in 2021, at an estimated cost of £60 million. As of 2020, the plan was reported to have been quietly forgotten in 2019 as funding was unlikely to be made available. It was confirmed subsequently that the project was still under consideration, with a motion to cancel it officially on environmental grounds being rejected by the council in June 2021. In October 2021, the route was formally cancelled.

== Western branch ==
The creation of the Glasgow East End Regeneration Route led to it being designated as the A728; however there was already a major road in Glasgow, located nearby but entirely separate, with this designation. The 'old' A728 is a suburban route of 2.4 miles (3.9 km) length which runs southwards from the Gorbals district starting at a junction with the A74 road (Ballater Street) at the City of Glasgow College just south of the River Clyde – northwards from this junction (Albert Bridge leading to Saltmarket) is considered to be the A8. Known as Laurieston Road at this point, it briefly joins the A730 as they pass the ruined Caledonia Road Church on either side, then continues south as Cathcart Road while the A730 turns eastwards.

It crosses over the M74 motorway without linking to it, as well as over the West Coast Main Line railway, then turns southeast as Aikenhead Road, passing the east side of the Govanhill district. After crossing the B763 (Calder Street, leading on to Junction 1A of the M74) at Polmadie, it passes close to Holyrood Secondary School, Cathkin Park, Toryglen Regional Football Centre and Hampden Park, terminating at the east/west-running King's Park Avenue (B766, changing to the B762 from this point eastwards). The north/south road continues under the Cathcart Circle Line railway bridge and onwards, mostly uphill, to Simshill, Castlemilk and Carmunnock as the B766.

After the completion of both the GEERR and the M74, the 0.6 miles (0.97 km) stretch of Polmadie Road – between the 'old' A728 and the M74 Junction 1A, for which it is the on/off slip feeder road – subsequently took the A728 designation as well (according to motorway gantry signage and Google Maps as of 2021, whereas local signs still indicate it as being the B763); this had previously been blocked off from Aikenhead Road until construction on the motorway began and a junction was created as a new access route, particularly for Hampden Park traffic. Irrespective of whether Polmadie Road is officially the A728, technically the GEERR does not connect to the motorway under that name, instead this ends at Shawfield Stadium, with the section of new road between the stadium and Hutchesontown (skirting around the reconstructed Oatlands neighbourhood with the motorway junction halfway along) labelled as part of the A730, which in the other direction continues south-eastwards to Rutherglen.

=== Public transport ===
The '75' bus service, one of the primary routes by the major operator in the region, First Glasgow, runs along the entire length of the 'old' A728 in both directions from the point of passing Caledonia Road Church (coincidentally also the location of the company's headquarters and depot since 2014).
