= Rutherglen Bridge =

Bridge in Glasgow, Scotland

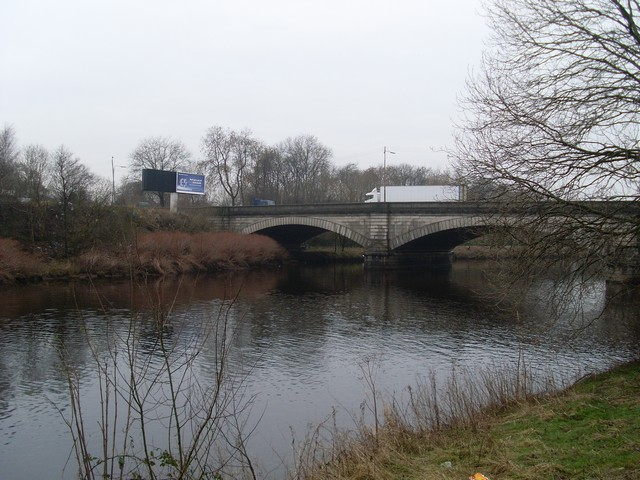
- Bridge crossing the River Clyde
- Coordinates: 55.8408°N 4.2277°W
- Carries: A728
- Crosses: River Clyde
- Locale: Glasgow
- Other name: Shawfield Bridge
- Preceded by: Shawfield Smartbridge
- Followed by: Polmadie Bridge

History
- Construction start: 1893
- Construction end: 1896

Location
- Interactive map of Rutherglen Bridge

The Rutherglen Bridge or the Shawfield Bridge is a bridge which was built 1893–96, which crosses the River Clyde, in Scotland.

It connects Shawfield, the most northerly district in the town of Rutherglen, and the south-side Glasgow district of Oatlands, with the Glasgow East End districts of Dalmarnock, Glasgow Green and Bridgeton. Bridgeton is in fact named after the first bridge at the site that was constructed in 1776 and designed by James Watt, which stood until 1890.

The road is part of the Glasgow East End Regeneration Route running between the M8 and M74 motorways. The Glasgow side of the bridge is a convenient point for walkers and cyclists to join the Clyde Walkway or National Cycle Route 75 which share a tarmac path along the river at this point.

It should not be confused with the nearby Dalmarnock Bridge which also connects Rutherglen to Dalmarnock, nor with a modern pedestrian 'Smartbridge' between Shawfield and Dalmarnock.

== See also ==
- List of bridges in Scotland
