= A74 road =

Road in Scotland

Coordinates: 55.83679°N 4.1556°W

A74

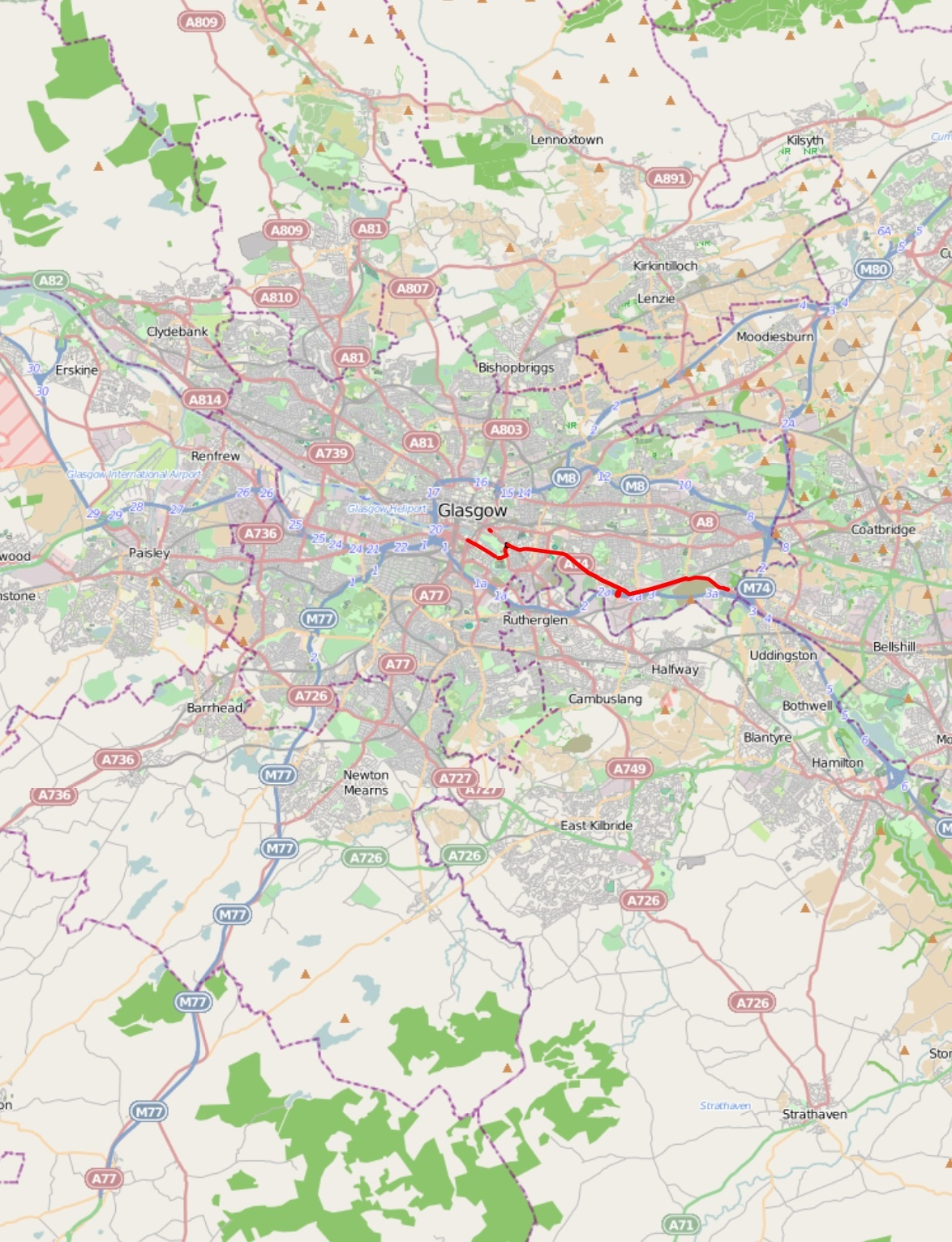

Route information
- Length: 7.1 mi (11.4 km)

Major junctions
- West end: A8 / A728 in Gorbals, Glasgow

- M74 in Carmyle, Glasgow; M74 in Broomhouse, Glasgow; M73 in Uddingston, Glasgow

- East end: A721 in Uddingston, Glasgow

Location
- Country: United Kingdom
- Constituent country: Scotland
- Council areas: Glasgow
- Municipalities: Glasgow

Road network
- Roads in the United Kingdom; Motorways; A and B road zones
← A73	→ A75

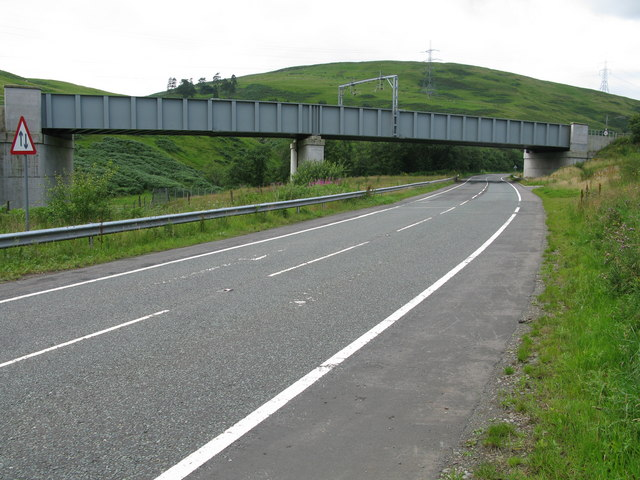
The former A74, now B7076, with the Caledonian Railway crossing overhead via the Harthope Viaduct, on the West Coast Main Line in Dumfries and Galloway. One half of the former dual carriageway has been removed.

The A74, also known historically as the Glasgow to Carlisle Road, is a formerly major road in the United Kingdom, linking Glasgow in Scotland to Carlisle in North West England, passing through Clydesdale, Annandale and the Southern Uplands. It formed part of the longer route between Glasgow and London. A road has existed in this area since Roman Britain, and it was considered one of the most important roads in Scotland, being used as a regular mail service route.

The road received a substantial upgrade in the early 19th century under the direction of Thomas Telford, who made significant engineering improvements, including a new route over the Beattock Summit and the Metal Bridge just in England just south of the border. Engineering improvements continued throughout the century and into the 20th, and it became one of the first trunk roads in Britain in 1936. From the 1960s the road started to be replaced by a parallel motorway, largely designated the M74. The last remaining section of all-purpose road on Telford's original alignment, the so-called "Cumberland Gap" between Carlisle and Metal Bridge, was replaced by a motorway in 2008 after years of delays due to a breakdown in discussions between the Westminster and Scottish governments. Currently the A74 is a suburban route of local importance that links the Gorbals and Broomhouse districts of Glasgow, via neighbourhoods in the city's East End.

The road was infamous for its allegedly high accident rate, being dubbed a "killer road", which exacerbated the need to provide an alternative motorway route. Several high-profile accidents occurred, most notoriously the debris of Pan Am Flight 103 in December 1988, which partially fell on the road near Lockerbie and caused several fatalities.

== Route ==
=== Original route ===
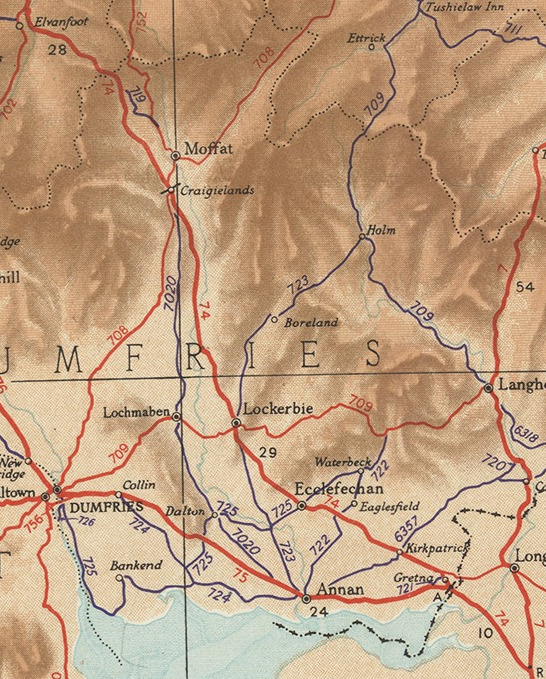
The southern section of the A74 through Dumfriesshire in 1932

The original route as classified by the Ministry of Transport was published as "Carlisle (Kingstown)–Gretna Green–Lockerbie–Crawford–Hamilton–Cambuslang–Glasgow". It started at the junction of Parkhouse Road and Kingstown Road to the north of Carlisle city centre, and followed a northwest route, crossing the River Esk at Metal Bridge and the Caledonian Railway at the Mossband Viaduct before crossing the Scottish border at the River Sark.

After passing through Gretna and Gretna Green, it followed the general line of the Caledonian railway toward Lockerbie and crossed the River Annan over a 24.4-metre (26.7 yd) bridge at Johnstonebridge. It followed the Annan valley into a rural area away from any settlements as it crossed the Beattock Summit between the Annan and Clyde valleys towards Elvanfoot. This section is on a different alignment from the Roman Road, which, as might be expected, took a straighter route across more mountainous terrain, particularly at the Roman signal station near Black Fell.

At Elvanfoot it crossed the River Clyde on a 27.4-metre (30.0 yd) span single-arch bridge, and continued to follow the Clyde Valley past the Roman Fort at Crawford towards Abington, where the Roman road to Edinburgh (now the A702) branched to the right. It left this sparsely populated section in the Southern Uplands and entered the Clydesdale communities of Lesmahagow, Kirkmuirhill and Larkhall, crossing the River Avon into Hamilton.

Beyond Hamilton, it followed the Glasgow Road north-west, crossing the Clyde at the Dalmarnock Bridge. It ended at the junction of Trongate and Gallowgate in the east end of Glasgow city centre. According to a summary in a report by the Institution of Civil Engineers, the length was 150 kilometres (93 miles).

=== Current route ===
The original road has been largely downgraded and renumbered and now only one short stub remains outside the Glasgow area; within the city boundaries it contains various remnants of a project from the 1930s that rerouted the road to run from Hamilton to Glasgow via Uddingston and the King's Bridge.

According to contemporary Ordnance Survey mapping, the A74 starts in the Gorbals as Ballater Street, meeting the A8 (the A728 also starts here) and crosses the Clyde at the King's Bridge, runs through Glasgow Green and into the East End suburbs (Bridgeton, Celtic Park football stadium / Parkhead, Lilybank, Braidfauld, Foxley and Mount Vernon, all as London Road), then becoming Hamilton Road and running eastwards as far as Broomhouse where it ends at the Black Bear Roundabout, a feeder for the M74 Junction 3A (Daldowie). The road continues as the dual carriageway A721 for a short distance underneath the elevated lanes of the M73 Maryville Interchange until a small roundabout towards either Birkenshaw (B7001) or Uddingston – the latter route becomes the A74 again (on its original alignment) for a matter of a few hundred yards to Powburn junction, where New Edinburgh Road eastwards then takes on the A721 designation leading on to Viewpark and Bellshill, while Uddingston Main Street southwards downgrades to the B7071.

== History ==
=== 19th century ===
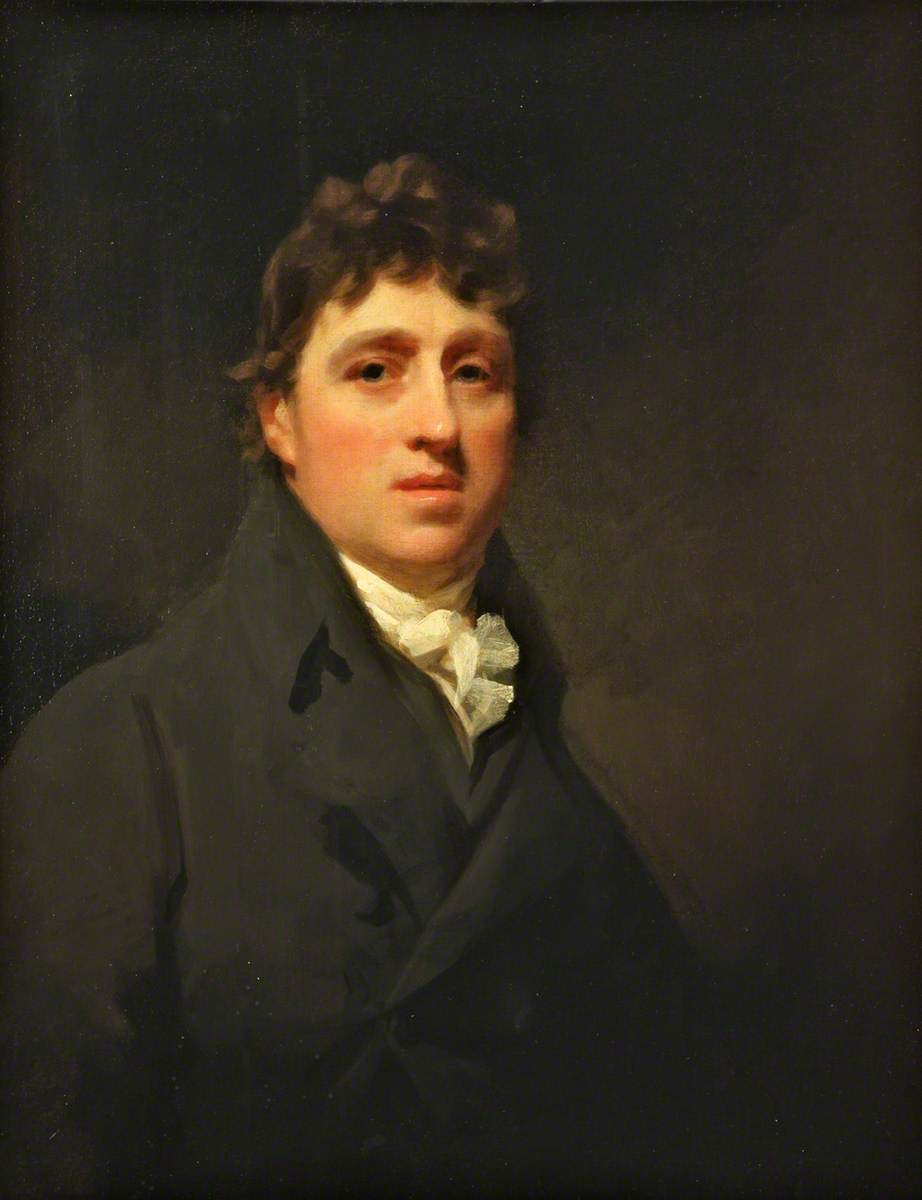
Thomas Telford, who was responsible for creating the route of what became the A74 as it existed for much of the 19th and 20th centuries

The A74 evolved from the Glasgow – Carlisle mail route. Originally, this followed the course of Roman roads, but by the early 19th century, this had become impractical as a fast through route for mail coaches. The problem had been exacerbated by the ineffective use of turnpike tolls, most of which consisted of little more than trying to fill potholes with stones. After an accident at a bridge crossing Evan Water, which killed two horses and destroyed a coach, the Post Office became fed up with trying to improve the route through the turnpike system and, considering it to be one of the most important roads in Scotland, decided to seek alternative means to improve it. Thomas Telford stated that "the existing road is in such as ruinous state as to occasion much delay", and he managed to obtain a grant under the guise of the Commissioners of Highland Roads and Bridges, to design engineering improvements to the route.

Telford was particularly concerned about being able to reduce gradients and improve drainage on roads, and recommended an improved route of a width no less than 34 feet, the central 18 feet being metalled, and the remainder being two gravel verges. The route was surveyed by William Alexander Provis in 1814–15, and commenced construction in 1816. The project was completed in 1825 at a total cost of £50,000, and like the earlier route, it was tolled. While the various turnpike trusts retained control for a few sections, the vast majority was rebuilt under the direction of Telford. Eight new toll-houses were constructed – one of these, at Dinwoodie Lodge near Johnstonebridge still exists today, and became a Grade I Listed building in December 1988.

Notable engineering feats included taking the road over the Beattock Summit, construction of the original Metal Bridge just south of the Scottish Border in 1820, and carrying the road over Cartland Craigs by a 130-foot viaduct. According to author Frederick Mort, the Glasgow to Carlisle road "became a model for future engineers."

=== 20th century ===
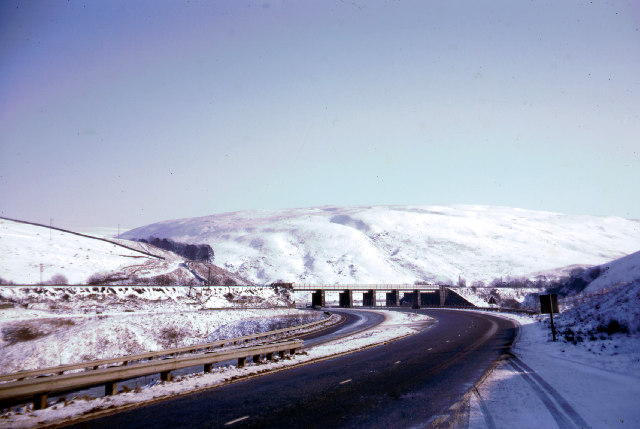
The A74 south of Beattock Summit in February 1969

In 1916, Telford's original metal bridge was replaced by a modern concrete structure at a cost of £16,000. A small section of the original bridge was housed in Tullie House Museum in Carlisle.

Roads started to be classified with route numbers in 1921, with the Glasgow – Carlisle road receiving the number A74, mostly following the route as designed by Telford. On 16 May 1936, the road was diverted away from Telford's route to run from Glasgow to Motherwell via Uddingston — it is a portion of this realignment that forms the modern A74 route within Glasgow. It became a trunk road when the act was first published in 1936. A contemporary report also suggested renumbering the entire A74, along with the A82 as an extension of the A6 to Inverness, matching the London — Carlisle — Glasgow — Inverness trunk road as used in internal Ministry of Transport documentation, but this was rejected as the cost of replacing signs would be prohibitively expensive.

Due to its continued status as one of the most important connections between England and Scotland, talks began in the 1950s to improve its quality to cater for modern motor traffic. While a 4 1/2-mile (7.2 km) section of dual carriageway had already been completed before World War II, Tom Steele, then MP for Lanark, was particularly keen on the entire route from Carlisle to Uddingston being dualled before the mid-1960s. On 2 August 1956, he received a memo from the Secretary of State for Transport about the matter, which stated "the plan is to complete the conversion in about 10 years. When this work is completed there will be a dual carriageway leading from the Border to Uddingston with no built-up areas along its length."

By the early 1960s, these plans had changed to consider building a motorway in preference for the more straightforward online upgrades. The original section of the M74 in the mid-1960s ran from just north of Kirkmuirhill in South Lanarkshire, connecting to an earlier dual carriageway bypass, to Hamilton. It was completed northwards in two stages, initially to Bothwell Bridge, and then Uddingston. In 1987, the then Secretary of State for Scotland, Malcolm Rifkind, announced the intention of completing the M74 from Glasgow to Carlisle. This commenced with a series of "fast track" road improvements, the initial two being between Abington and Millbank, then from Kirkpatrick Fleming to Gretna.

By 2008, the A74(M) motorway extended southwards to the northern terminus of the M6, at the Scottish border, and was extended northwards in the mid-1990s as far as the Glasgow suburbs of Carmyle and Tollcross. In 2011 it was further extended to meet the M8. The parallel road which was the A74 has been mostly downgraded in two sections as the B7076 and B7078.

=== Cumberland Gap ===
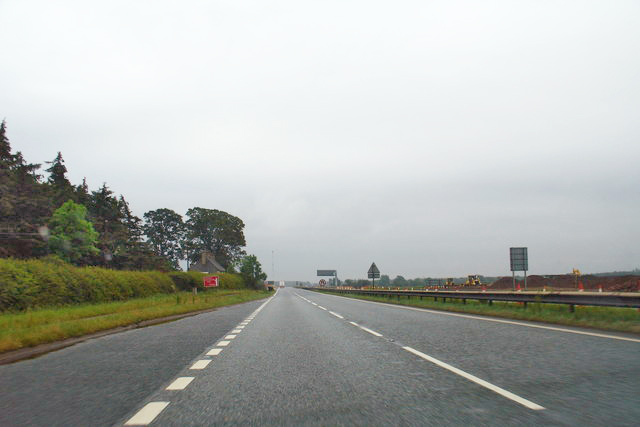
The A74 Cumberland Gap in 2007

The Cumberland Gap (named after the historic county of Cumberland, now part of Cumbria) was the 5.8 miles (9.3 km) of A74 between the northern terminus of the M6 at Carlisle, and the south end of the A74(M) at the Scottish border. It existed as an isolated stub from 1992, when the A74 was improved to motorway standard around Gretna, to 2008, when the M6 was extended northwards. Scottish ministers had previously expressed disappointment at slow progress over the border; in 1964, Dumfries MP Hector Monro stated "there is widespread feeling in the south of Scotland that the advance south over the Border of this important new road is being delayed because England is dragging her feet."

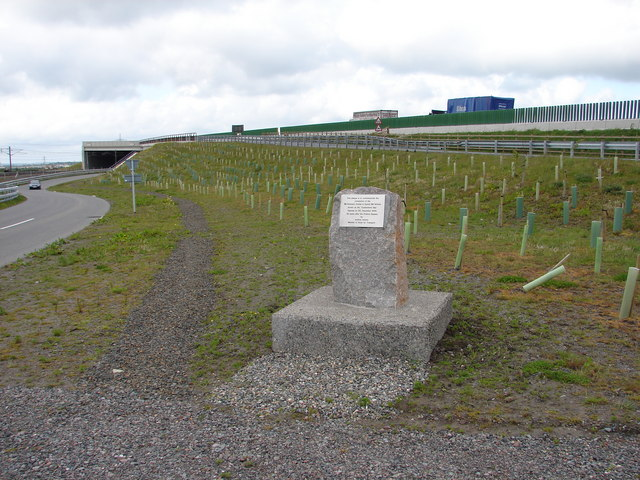
A plaque commemorating the opening of the northern section of M6, replacing the final southern section of A74

When the M6 was complete around Carlisle in 1971, a new 4.5-mile (7.2 km) section of dual carriageway A74 was created to tie in with the original road running from Kingstown. The 1916 Metal Bridge also had to be replaced, in order to accommodate the increased traffic levels.

An offer from the Scottish Executive to build the road to meet the M6 was not accepted by the English Highways Agency. This left a remnant of the old A74 as a stretch of two-lane dual carriageway between two long, three-lane motorways. Lex Gold, the director of the Scottish Confederation of British Industry, said "We are very disappointed indeed by this part of the programme revision. This will mean that for now and many years, road users will face a six-mile [9.6 km] dual carriageway between an excellent Scottish motorway and before the road widens for the existing M6." On 1 July 1999, following devolution, control of the A74 improvements passed over to the Scottish Parliament, meaning that they could only improve the route as far as the border.

After years of political battles between the English Highways Agency and the Scottish Executive, followed by a lengthy design and public enquiry phase, the "M6 Motorway Extension Carlisle to Guards Mill" became part of the government's targeted plan of improvements in 2002, with the intention to start work around 2005–06 at a cost of £65 million. Due to delays with the G8 Conference in 2005, construction work started on 25 July 2006, and included a replacement for the 1971 Metal Bridge, and a new VOSA testing site. The new stretch of road was officially opened by Lord Adonis on 5 December 2008, the 50th anniversary of the opening of the first motorway in the UK, the Preston Bypass, now also part of the M6. It subsequently became one of the finalists for the Prime Minister's Award for Better Public Building (losing to Joseph Chamberlain Sixth Form College).

== Safety and accidents ==
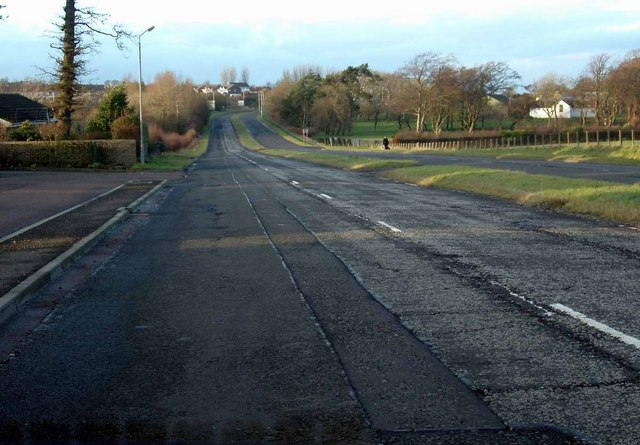
A section of former A74 near Lesmahagow. Its comparatively primitive specification compared to modern motorways drew strong criticism regarding the road's safety

The A74 drew regular criticism over its perceived lack of safety. Some motorists had criticised the A74 as being a "killer road" due to its perceived high number of accidents. MPs, however, were keen to stress that the rate of accidents was no different from any other road of comparable traffic size. In 1976, Frank McElhone, then the Under-Secretary of State for Scotland, stated that "the A74 has gained a bad reputation. Whether this is justified in comparison with other roads is to some extent a matter of opinion."

By the 1970s, following completion of the M6 to north of Carlisle, the remaining all-purpose section of the A74 was becoming increasingly outdated and unsafe, and so a special speed limit of 60 mph (97 km/h) (40 mph (64 km/h) for HGVs) was imposed. Hector Monro MP was particularly concerned about the speed of heavy goods vehicles along the road, and wanted to erect signs reminding lorry drivers of what the correct limit for that class of vehicle was. He claimed that they did not realise they were driving on an all-purpose route and ignored the different speed limits.

On 16 June 1975, an articulated lorry travelling southbound in heavy rain crossed the central reserve of the A74 near Beattock, hitting a coach that was travelling northbound. Ten passengers travelling in the coach were killed, including the driver, and twenty were seriously injured. Since the accident involved traversing a grass-covered central reserve, concerns were raised about retrofitting crash barriers along the entirety of the road.

On 22 December 2004, a major road accident occurred on the Cumberland Gap section of the A74 near Metal Bridge, after high winds tipped a lorry travelling southbound onto the opposite carriageway, causing it to collide with two other goods vehicles. Because one of the lorries carried chemicals, the entire road had to be shut for 24 hours, causing widespread congestion across the area. David Maclean, MP for Penrith and The Border, said "I'm fed up nagging about the Cumberland gap", adding "I know the government considers railways to be a higher priority, but Cumbria cannot survive without decent roads."

In August 2008, when the A74 was still an all-purpose road across the Cumberland Gap, the Highways Agency took out a special order to ban cyclists and pedestrians from the route, advising them to use the A7 to Longtown instead. Despite warning signs for cyclists being erected, traffic officer Glenn Lamont still found that "some cyclists are ignoring this and with the roadworks and contra flow in place there is a really high risk of an accident".

=== Pan Am Flight 103 ===
In December 1988, the A74 around Lockerbie received international media attention, when Pan Am Flight 103 was destroyed by an explosive device above the town, scattering debris around the local area. The wing section of the aircraft landed in Sherwood Crescent, which runs parallel to what was then the A74 Lockerbie Bypass, destroying houses and striking several vehicles. According to eyewitness reports, the resulting fires caused cars to be set alight on the road, and took "a huge bite out of the southbound lane".

In 1994, the Prime Minister, John Major, said the government would take civil action against Pan Am for the damage caused to the A74. He stressed the action was concerned with negligence by the company over its aircraft and had no connection with the ongoing investigation of terrorism.

== Junction list ==
Council area	Location	mi	km	Destinations	Notes
Glasgow	Glasgow	0.0	0.0	Crown Street / Ballater Street (A8) / Laurieston Road (A728 south)	Western terminus; northern terminus of A728
Glasgow	Glasgow	0.8	1.3	A749 south (James Street) / The Green – East Kilbride, Shawfield, Polmadie, Rutherglen, Dalmarnock	Dalmarnock signed eastbound only, A749, East Kilbride, Shawfield and Polmadie signed westbound only; western terminus of A749 concurrency
Glasgow	Glasgow	1.0	1.6	A749 north (London Road) / Abercromby Street – City centre, Glasgow Cross, Dennistoun	Information signed eastbound only; eastern terminus of A749 concurrency
Glasgow	Glasgow	1.9	3.1	A728 (The Clyde Gateway) to M8 / M74 / M77 / M80 – Stirling, Edinburgh, East Kilbride	To M74 signed westbound only
Glasgow	Glasgow	3.6	5.8	M74 to M73 – Stirling, Edinburgh, Carlisle, Cambuslang, Rutherglen	To M73, Stirling, Edinburgh and Carlisle signed westbound only; M74 junction 2A
Glasgow	Glasgow	4.0	6.4	A763 south (Clydeford Road) / B765 (Carmyle Avenue) to M74 – Carmyle, Cambuslang, Tollcross, Shettleston	Tollcross signed eastbound only, Cambuslang westbound only; northern termius of A763
Glasgow	Glasgow	6.0	9.7	M73 north to M74 / M8 – Glasgow, Stirling, Edinburgh	M74 and Glasgow signed westbound only
Glasgow	Glasgow	7.0	11.3	M74 southeast – Carlisle	Access only to M74 southeast
Glasgow	Glasgow	7.1	11.4	A721 southeast (New Edinburgh Road) / B7071 (Glasgow Road) – Bellshill, Uddingston	Eastern terminus; northwestern terminus of A721
1.000 mi = 1.609 km; 1.000 km = 0.621 mi: Concurrency terminus; Incomplete access

== See also ==
A74(M) and M74 motorways, which have largely replaced the A74
