= A730 road =

Road in Scotland running from the centre of Glasgow to Cathkin

Coordinates: 55.830723°N 4.221099°W

A730

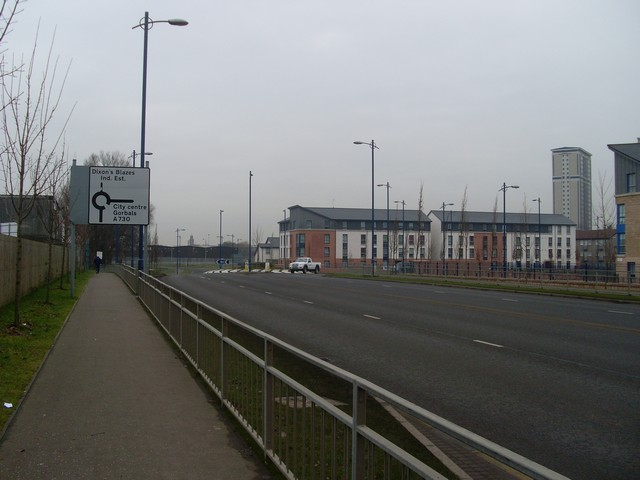
- A730 New Rutherglen Road, Oatlands

Route information
- Length: 5.1 mi (8.2 km)

Major junctions
- Northwest end: Glasgow (Gorbals)
- Southeast end: Rutherglen (Cathkin)

Location
- Country: United Kingdom
- Constituent country: Scotland

Road network
- Roads in the United Kingdom; Motorways; A and B road zones
| ← A728 | → A735 |

The A730 road in Scotland runs between the centre of Glasgow and the south-eastern edge of the city's urban area at Cathkin.

== Route ==
=== Glasgow ===
The A730 starts at Gorbals Cross in the Laurieston neighbourhood just south of the River Clyde; it is a continuation of the road flanked by Glasgow Sheriff Court and Glasgow Central Mosque that crosses the river on the Victoria Bridge, designated as an 'arm' of the A8 although marked on some maps as the A730. It heads southwards through the district as Gorbals Street, passing the Citizens' Theatre, and merges with the A728 for a short distance as they pass the ruined Caledonia Road Church. It then turns east as Caledonia Road (the A728 continues south as Cathcart Road), running south-eastwards past Hutchesontown (directly past two of the city's taller tower blocks), Dixon's Blazes Industrial Estate and the Southern Necropolis to Oatlands, where it was once a straight route (Rutherglen Road) passing Richmond Park, but since the reconstruction of the neighbourhood from the 2000s is now an angular bypass (The Boulevard / Kilbride Street) which allows closer access to Junction 1A of the M74 motorway which opened in 2011.

=== Rutherglen ===
After a junction at Shawfield Stadium with the Glasgow East End Regeneration Route (also known as the Clyde Gateway, a separate 21st century section of dual carriageway also designated the A728 though not directly connected to the older labeled route), the A730 then runs south out of the city as Glasgow Road into the Shawfield industrial district, becoming a dual carriageway and going under the elevated M74 but offering no access (earlier plans for the motorway included a junction at this location), over the West Coast Main Line railway tracks, then into Rutherglen. Meeting the town's Main Street (B768) at a crossroads with no access to the Burnhill neighbourhood for pedestrians, who are instead directed to an underpass, it continues south as Mill Street, a bypass through the burgh that commenced in the 1970s and continued in the early 1990s – remnants of the older streets it replaced are still visible on either side.

A pedestrian overbridge is followed by a fairly steep incline as the road passes Overtoun Park (average speed cameras have been installed on this section), shortly before it meets the B762 King's Park Avenue at Rutherglen Cemetery.

After passing under the Cathcart Circle Line railway bridge, the A730 becomes single carriageway just prior to what was previously a staggered junction with an unclassified road for Spittal, Croftfoot and Castlemilk, and turned east along Blairbeth Road, a narrow residential street in some places, joining the A749 (East Kilbride Road) just under a mile further on at a junction to the north of Springhall. The A730 was redesignated following the opening of the Cathkin Relief Road, a section of bypass of around the same length, planned for decades but opened in 2016 amid protests from local residents to draw traffic from existing routes such as Blairbeth Road and the Fernhill neighbourhood – a new four-way junction was also added at Spittal to ease congestion, while Blairbeth Road became a continuation of the B762 towards Burnside. The relief road now joins a much older section of the bypass at the west side of Cathkin, passes to the south of Springhall and terminates where it meets the A749 at a roundabout to the south of Whitlawburn.

=== Public transport ===
The '267' bus service, one of the primary routes by the major operator in the region, First Glasgow, runs along the length of the A730 within the city, turning east on the B768 Rutherglen Main Street (within South Lanarkshire it mainly follows the A724). The less frequent '21' uses almost the entire A730 route, other than still going into Fernhill rather than using the new bypass. In the first half of the 20th century, Glasgow Corporation Tramways also operated on part of the route, specifically the 10 which had its terminus at Rutherglen.
