= Polmadie Bridge =

Footbridge in Glasgow, Scotland

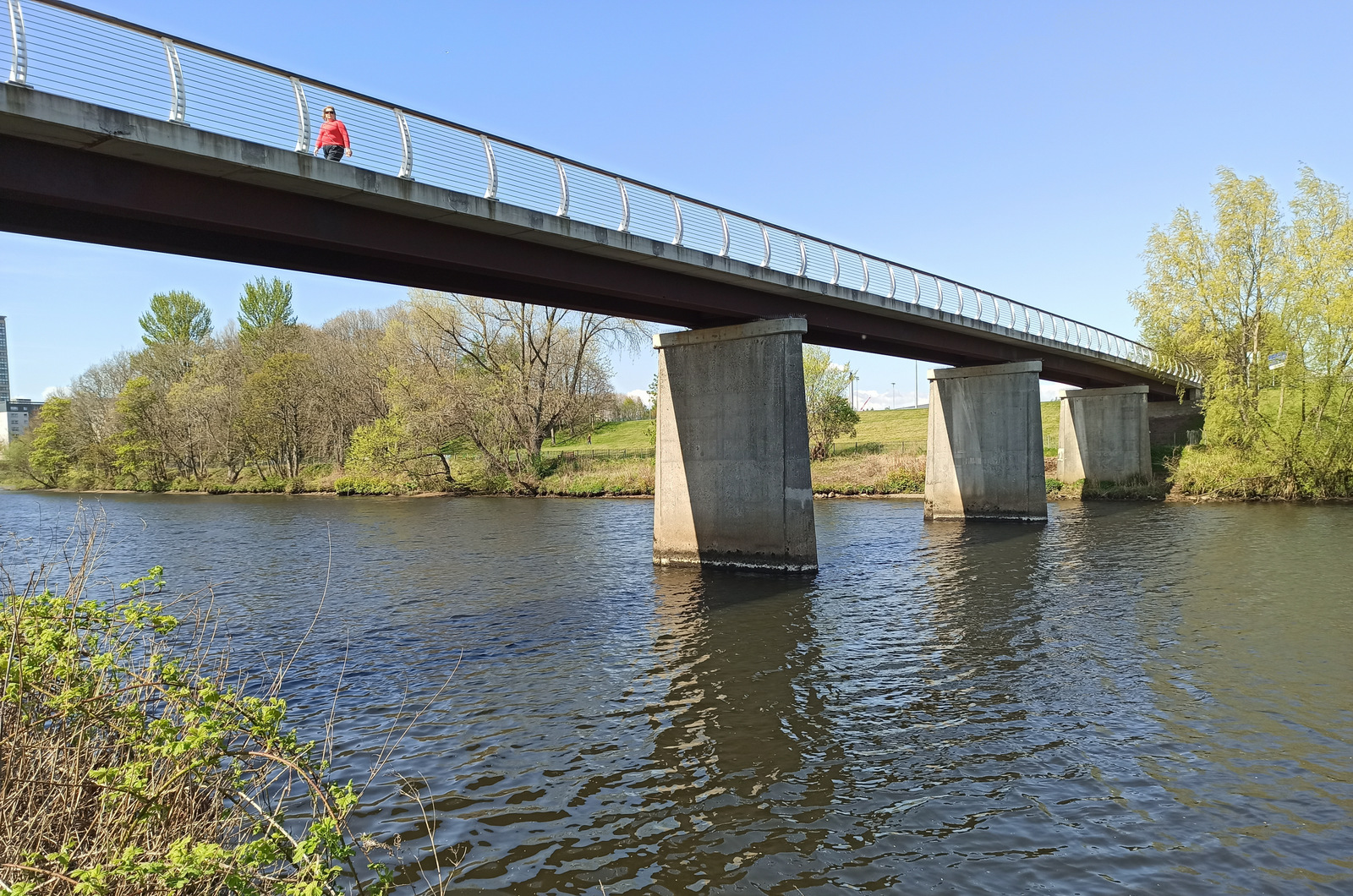
- The new bridge in place, seen from the south bank
- Coordinates: 55.8425°N 4.2354°W
- Crosses: River Clyde
- Locale: Glasgow
- Preceded by: Rutherglen Bridge
- Followed by: King's Bridge, Glasgow

Location
- Interactive map of Polmadie Bridge

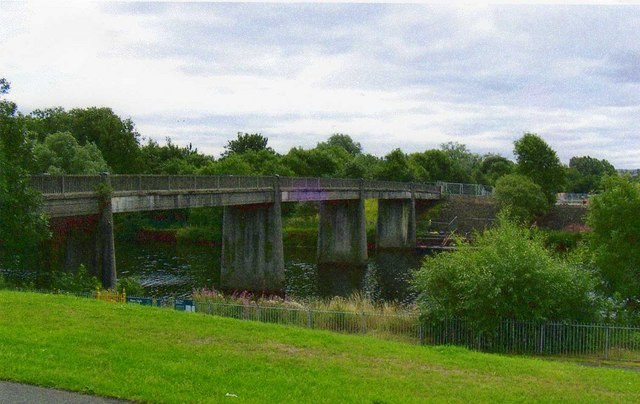
The original bridge prior to its demolition, seen from the north bank (2005)

The Polmadie Bridge is a footbridge that crosses the River Clyde, Glasgow, Scotland between Glasgow Green (the Flesher's Haugh area which is largely football pitches) to its north, and Oatlands (at the west side of Richmond Park) to its south.

== History ==
The first version of a bridge at the site was wooden, constructed from 1899 and completed in 1901, opening on the same day (13 June) as the original version of the nearby King's Bridge. This structure was partly destroyed by fire in 1921 and rebuilt by Sir William Arrol & Co., closing in 1939.

The replacement bridge, being four feet (1.2 metres) narrower than its predecessor, was constructed in 1954–1955, made from prestressed concrete. It was closed by Glasgow City Council on 14 May 2015, for reasons of public safety. Press Reports dated 16 July 2015 indicated the bridge was to be demolished – leaving concrete piers, and allowing restrictions on the stretch of river to be removed. Work to remove the bridge deck, leaving the concrete piers in place, began in October 2015. Demolition took about five months, after which access to footpaths along the riverbanks was restored.

In their 2017/2018 budget announced 16 February 2017, Glasgow City Council listed plans to "Build a new cycle and footbridge between Oatlands and Glasgow Green – replacing the demolished Polmadie Bridge" as one of the key projects for the financial year. Construction of the new bridge began in late 2017, with the initial £1.3 million cost funded by the local authority augmented by an additional £500,000 from the sustainable transport charity Sustrans. By May 2018, the five 25-tonne beams comprising the base had been lifted into place using a large crane. The new bridge was completed and formally opened in August 2018.

== See also ==
- Bridges in Glasgow
