= Rosebery Park =

Stadium in Glasgow, Scotland

- Location within Glasgow council area
- Location: Oatlands, Glasgow, Scotland
- Coordinates: 55.838°N 4.236°W
- Owner: Glasgow City Council (after 1961)
- Type: Stadium
- Surface: Grass

Construction
- Opened: 1918
- Closed: 1990s
- Demolished: 2000s

Tenants
- Shawfield F.C. 1918–1960; Pollok F.C. 1926?–1928? Glasgow schools' football 1963–1990s

Rosebery Park was a football ground in the Oatlands area of Glasgow, Scotland. It was the home of Shawfield F.C. from 1918 to 1960, before being acquired by Glasgow Corporation as a venue for schools' football matches. The discovery that the site was contaminated led to the ground becoming derelict in the 1990s, and it was subsequently demolished.

== History ==
Rosebery Park was named after the former Prime Minister, the 5th Earl of Rosebery. Located on the south-west side of Toryglen Street near Polmadie Road, it was the home of Shawfield from 1918 to 1960. Pollok also sometimes used the ground in the late 1920s whilst they were without a permanent ground.

Following the demise of Shawfield, the Glasgow Corporation Education Committee arranged to buy the ground in 1961 in order to provide a venue for the schools' football competitions they organised. After being refurbished at a total cost of £14,000, the ground was reopened for schools' matches in April 1963.

Rosebery Park fell into disuse after it was discovered that the site had become contaminated by Chrome waste from factories in nearby Shawfield, Rutherglen. It had not hosted football for a number of years prior to being cleared and redeveloped to make way for the M74 motorway extension.
