= Provan =

Provan may refer to:

- Andy Provan, Scottish footballer
- Charles D. Provan, American revisionist scholar and Christian theologian
- Chris Provan, Born 1978 served 1st Bn Scots Guards 1996-2004
- David Provan (disambiguation)
  - David Provan (footballer, born 1941) (1941–2016), Scottish footballer who played with Rangers and Scotland
  - David Provan (footballer, born 1956) (born 1956), Scottish footballer who played with Celtic and Scotland
- Jaimee Provan, New Zealand field hockey olympian
- James Provan, British politician
- Norm Provan, Australian rugby league footballer and coach (brother of Peter)
- Peter Provan, Australian rugby league footballer (brother of Norm)
- Robert Provan, polio survivor and lawyer
- Susan Provan, Australian performing arts producer, director of the Melbourne International Comedy Festival
- Provan Gas Works, Scottish industrial gas holding plant
