= Dalmarnock =

District of Glasgow, Scotland

Coordinates: 55.84229°N 4.211369°W

Dalmarnock: Scottish Gaelic: Dail Mheàrnaig
- Location within Glasgow
- OS grid reference: NS611630
- Council area: Glasgow City Council
- Lieutenancy area: Glasgow
- Country: Scotland
- Sovereign state: United Kingdom
- Post town: GLASGOW
- Postcode district: G40
- Dialling code: 0141
- Police: Scotland
- Fire: Scottish
- Ambulance: Scottish
- UK Parliament: Glasgow Central
- Scottish Parliament: Glasgow Shettleston

Dalmarnock (/dælˈmɑːrnək/, Scottish Gaelic: Dail Mheàrnaig) is a district in the Scottish city of Glasgow. It is situated east of the city centre, directly north of the River Clyde opposite the town of Rutherglen. It is also bounded by the Glasgow neighbourhoods of Parkhead to the north-east and Bridgeton to the north-west.

== History ==
The area was once heavily industrialised. Sir William Arrol & Co. had its extensive engineering works at Dunn Street and Baltic Street from 1873. From its beginnings in boiler making, the firm later became renowned for its achievements in the field of structural engineering. Amongst the many bridges constructed throughout Britain were the Forth Railway Bridge, the Forth Road Bridge, the Humber Bridge and London's Tower Bridge. The company was eventually taken over by Clarke Chapman in 1969 and the Dalmarnock Works closed in 1986. There was also a large coal-fired power station located near Dalmarnock Bridge. It was built by Glasgow Corporation in two stages, with phase one opening in 1920 and phase two in 1926. It was closed in 1977 by the South of Scotland Electricity Board.

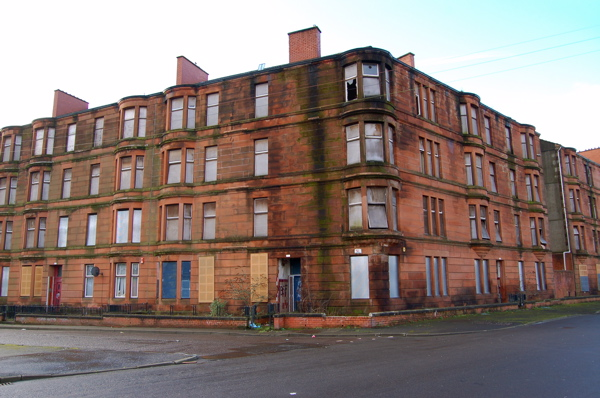
Victorian sandstone tenements in Ardenlea Street that were originally renovated as part of the GEAR (Glasgow Eastern Area Renewal) scheme in the late 1970s, but had their residents systematically rehoused, which led them to fall into a dilapidated state once more. They were totally demolished as part of the 2014 Commonwealth Games Athletes' Village masterplan by RMJM.

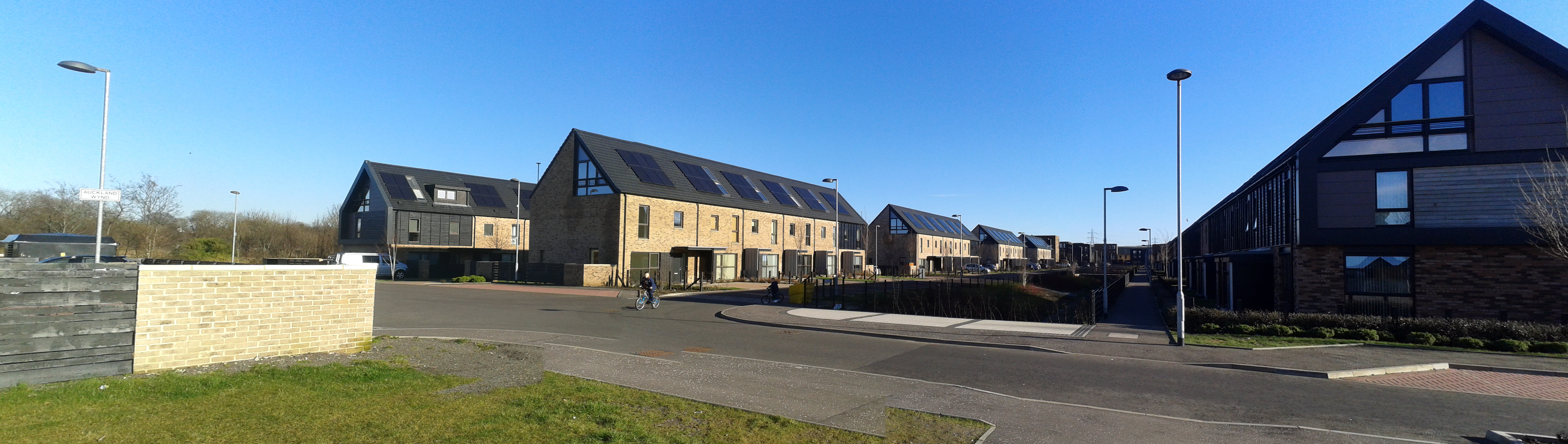
The same general area in 2016, now Auckland Wynd (road layout changes mean there is now no direct counterpart to Ardenlea Street)

The east side of Allan Street was bombed during the Second World War. Most of the Victorian red sandstone tenements on Dalmarnock Road and Springfield Road were demolished in the 1960s and early-1970s, although some were renovated as part of the Glasgow Eastern Area Renewal (GEAR) scheme in the late 1970s. In the 1960s, a new housing scheme was built, consisting of four twenty-two storey tower blocks and "H-block" maisonettes. Two of the towers, 40 & 50 Millerfield Road, were demolished on 3 February 2002. One other tower was demolished on 1 July 2007, and the final one on 9 September 2007. This physical transformation featured in Chris Leslie's 'Disappearing Glasgow' book.

Dalmarnock was the location chosen for the athletes' village when Glasgow hosted the 2014 Commonwealth Games, and by August 2011, there was no remaining housing on Ardenlea Street/Sunnybank Street side of the area, due to the preparations and land need for the construction in the area pertaining to the Games and City Legacy.

From 19 May to 2 June 2014, BBC One Scotland aired a documentary entitled "Commonwealth City", narrated by actor Martin Compston, which showed how the people and community in Dalmarnock had been affected since the games were announced in November 2007. The documentary featured local resident Margaret Jaconelli (evicted to make way for the Games), David Stewart (youth and community campaigner) Darren Faulds (local entrepreneur) and local councillors George Redmond & Yvonne Kucuk.

The Sir Chris Hoy Velodrome, constructed for the Games, is located at the intersection of Springfield Road, London Road and the Glasgow East End Regeneration Route, opposite Celtic Park football stadium which denotes the district's boundary with Parkhead. A triangular piece of land to the east of the arena was the proposed location of a modern skyscraper, East One; however as of 2020 this site was still undeveloped. To the south of this is the 'Legacy Hub' building, a multi-function community facility belatedly installed to replace the previous hall at Lily Street. It opened in 2015 but by January 2019 had closed suddenly amid financial problems at the People's Development Trust charity which ran its operations; the council purchased the building to secure its future, while an investigation found funds had been embezzled by charity leaders including former councillor Yvonne Kucuk.

Clyde Gateway is a large-scale regeneration programme which includes Dalmarnock. It is a partnership between Glasgow City Council, South Lanarkshire Council and Scottish Enterprise, backed by funding and direct support from the Scottish Government. Residential developments in the area following the Commonwealth Games include Riverside, a project on the site of the former large power station overlooking the river (approximately 550 homes for purchase and social rent), and a site near the railway station (200 homes, in planning as of 2018).

After the departure of all local retailers from the area, all that remained was a small shop which was set up by the workers in the Community Centre; This was a welcome boon for the area residents as the nearest shops were not within walking distance. There is a petrol station on Dalmarnock Road and a car wash, with a pub a short distance further north past the railway station (this has been the location of a licensed premises under various names since the 1830s). There are also a lot of small business units in the Nuneaton Street area and the Calder Millerfield factory which supplies meat-based products to the fast-food market.

== Education ==
The area once had four schools: Springfield Road Primary, Springfield Primary, Riverside Secondary and Our Lady of Fatima RC Primary School on Springfield Road have now closed. There is still a 'Dalmarnock Primary School', but it is situated in nearby Bridgeton and should not be counted among the schools within the area. A new primary school was developed by Glasgow City Council; Riverbank Primary School, opened in August 2019.

== Transport ==
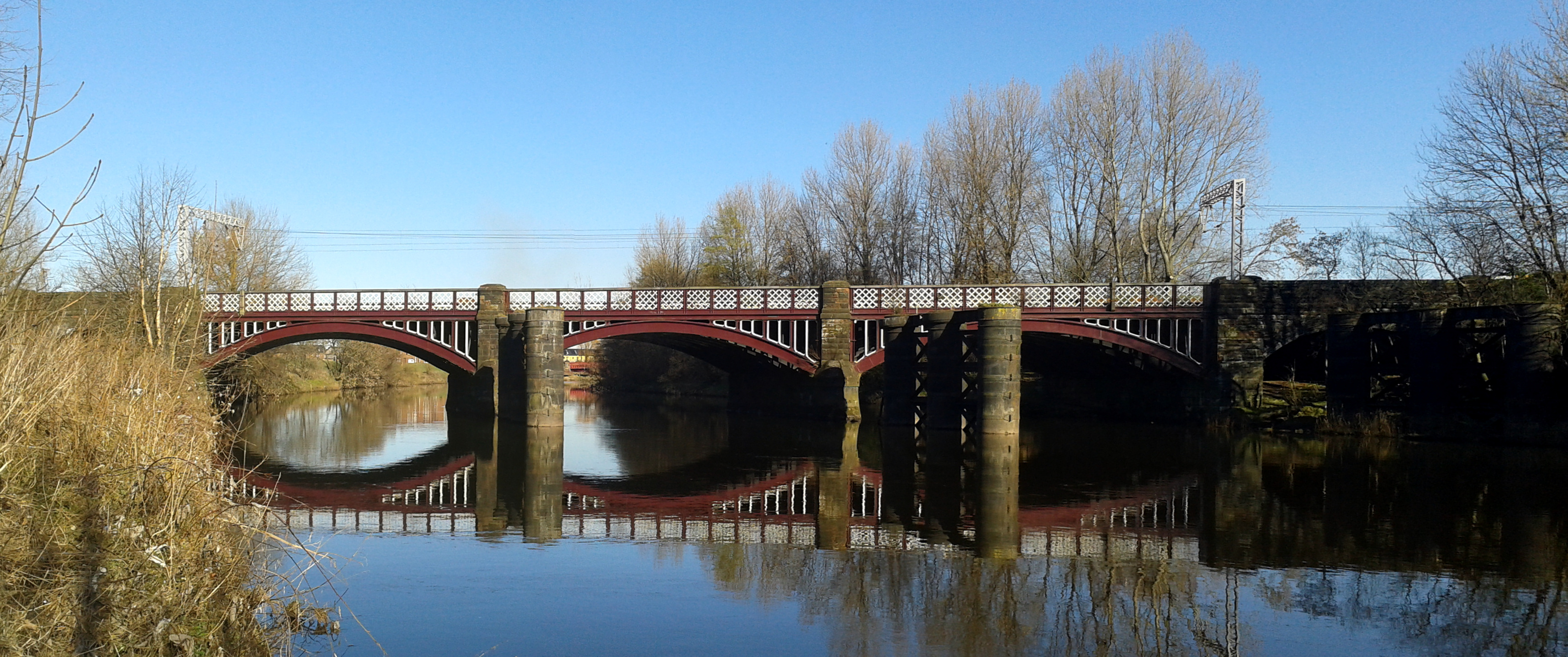
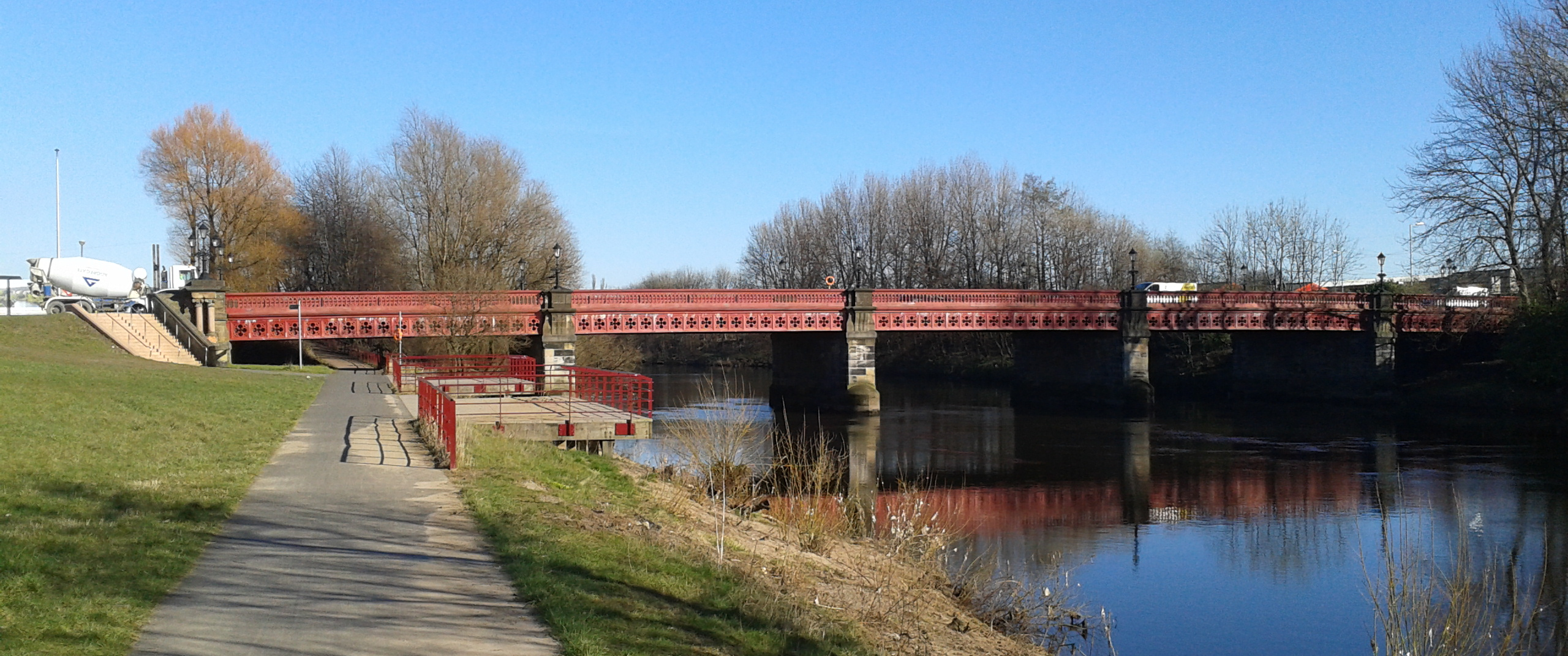
Dalmarnock bridges, 2016: railway bridge (including piers of earlier bridge) upper; road bridge lower.

Dalmarnock railway station, on the Argyle Line, serves the local area. The station was upgraded for the 2014 Commonwealth Games. Glasgow Corporation Tramways had routes serving the area in the first half of the 20th century, using tracks on Dalmarnock Road, London Road and Springfield Road.

=== Dalmarnock Railway Bridges ===
There have been two railway bridges in Dalmarnock crossing the River Clyde. The first bridge was built in 1861, and was augmented in 1897, by a wider bridge to accommodate the Dalmarnock branch line. The stone pillars of the old bridge are still in situ adjacent to the newer bridge, with the track deck having been removed when it was no longer necessary to have so many lines. Both bridges were designed by George Graham.

=== Dalmarnock Bridge ===
There is also a road bridge over the River Clyde on Dalmarnock Road (A749) called Dalmarnock Bridge. The first bridge at the location was wooden, erected in 1821 to connect Dalmarnock and the Farme Cross area of Rutherglen. It was replaced by a new timber bridge in 1848, and in 1891 by the current Dalmarnock Bridge, designed by Glasgow consulting engineers, Crouch & Hogg; it is Category B listed.

The Glasgow side of the bridge is a convenient point for walkers and cyclists to join the Clyde Walkway or National Cycle Route 75 which share a tarmac path along the river at this point.

This structure should not be confused with the nearby Rutherglen Bridge which also connects Rutherglen and Dalmarnock (as well as Glasgow Green, Oatlands, Shawfield and Bridgeton), nor with two modern pedestrian bridges: one also connecting to Shawfield, and the other between the 2014 Athletes' Village homes and the Cuningar Loop, an area of open ground on a meander of the river, known locally as 'The Vallies' and converted to a park as part of the area's redevelopment).

== Notable people ==
- Professional footballer Kenny Dalglish who played for Celtic F.C. and Liverpool was born in Dalmarnock although he grew up in Milton. He officially opened the Dalmarnock Legacy Hub on 9 October 2015.
- George Chisholm, trombonist, was born in Dalmarnock.
- Glasvegas, rock band.

== See also ==
- Glasgow tower blocks
