= Hutchesontown =

Area of Glasgow, Scotland

Coordinates: 55.847119°N 4.243909°W

Hutchesontown: Scottish Gaelic: Baile MacUisdein; Scots: Hutchesontoun
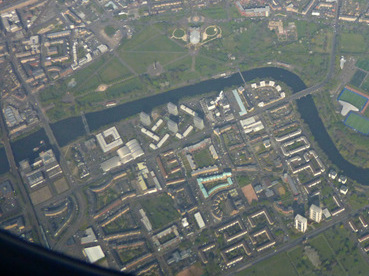
- Aerial photo of Hutchesontown on the south bank of the River Clyde (with Calton and Glasgow Green on the north bank)

- Location within Glasgow
- OS grid reference: NS594636
- Council area: Glasgow City Council
- Lieutenancy area: Glasgow
- Country: Scotland
- Sovereign state: United Kingdom
- Post town: GLASGOW
- Postcode district: G5 0
- Dialling code: 0141
- Police: Scotland
- Fire: Scottish
- Ambulance: Scottish
- UK Parliament: Glasgow Central
- Scottish Parliament: Glasgow Shettleston

Hutchesontown is an inner-city area in Glasgow, Scotland. Mostly residential, it is situated directly south of the River Clyde and forms part of the wider historic Gorbals district, which is covered by the Southside Central ward under Glasgow City Council.

The area is linked to Glasgow Green public park on the north side of the river by St. Andrew's Suspension Bridge and King's Bridge. At its north-western edge, Albert Bridge is the closest crossing point towards Glasgow city centre. In McNeill Street, Hutchesontown has one of Glasgow's original Carnegie libraries, deftly designed by the Inverness-born architect James Robert Rhind. James Stokes, recipient of the Victoria Cross, was from the area.

== Comprehensive Development Area ==
Following the Second World War, Hutchesontown was declared a Comprehensive Development Area (CDA) in 1957, in the aftermath of the Bruce Report. This called for the mass gentrification of the area which took the form of slum clearance and the replacement of overcrowded, insanitary tenement housing with new homes in high rise tower blocks. The area became almost unrecognisable from its previous appearance, with blocks of tenements swept away along with several Victorian and Edwardian-era churches and civic buildings which in later times would have been considered to be of architectural merit.

Hutchesontown was, in effect, used as a testing ground for similar schemes around the city. It was decided to divide the area into five "zones" which were given to different architects to implement a mixture of different schemes.

- Area A – on the northern side of the CDA was devoted to conventional maisonette style housing - today close to the Gorbals Health Centre and Gorbals Sports Centre.
- Area B – nowadays known as the Riverside estate, was assigned to architect Robert Matthew (RMJM). The four 18-storey blocks – built in 1964 to the distinctive "scissor section" configuration – on the banks of the River Clyde still stand, and are widely regarded as the most successful of the Gorbals high-rises and have received numerous refurbishments in their lifetime. The Strathclyde Grain distillery lies directly to the east. After the demolition of the two remaining Area D towers in 2025 (see below), these are now the only remaining high rise blocks in the Gorbals.
- Area C – was the responsibility of Basil Spence, and became the most infamous of the five schemes. The Queen Elizabeth Square blocks encountered numerous structural and social problems, and were demolished in 1993.
- Area D – This sector in the south of the CDA is close to the Oatlands neighbourhood, the Southern Necropolis cemetery and the 'Dixon's Blazes' industrial estate; it was redeveloped by the newly created Scottish Special Housing Association and consisted of four 24-storey blocks on Old Rutherglen Road, Cumberland Street and Caledonia Road (the latter - part of the A730 - also being the main bus route through the area between Glasgow and Rutherglen) and an estate of smaller maisonettes and 8-storey "mini-multis". The Old Rutherglen Road and Cumberland Street towers were demolished in early 2006; the remaining two blocks (known to locals as the "Cali flats") had been refurbished in the mid 1990s, but in 2020 it was confirmed that they too would be demolished in the near future due to issues with the cladding that was applied in the previous work and the prohibitive cost of remedying these faults. Stripping of the external fittings began in mid-2024, and after delays the flats were demolished on 29 June 2025.
- Area E – closest to Gorbals Cross and Laurieston, consisted of an estate of twelve seven-storey deck-access blocks and two 24-storey towers at Sandiefield Road, constructed in the late 60s and early 70s. Within a few years, however, the low-rise buildings became badly affected by dampness and condensation problems and were presently declared unfit for habitation; they were finally demolished in 1987. The two towers were condemned in 2010 and were demolished at 14:00 on 21 July 2013.

=== Gallery ===
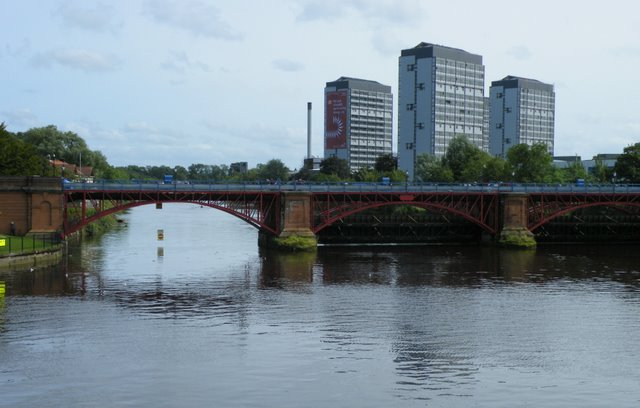
River Clyde and Waddell Court towers ('Hutchie B'), 2009

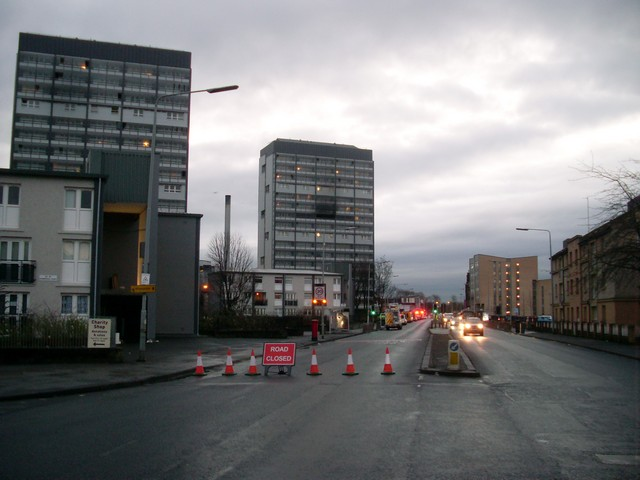
Ballater Street, 2009

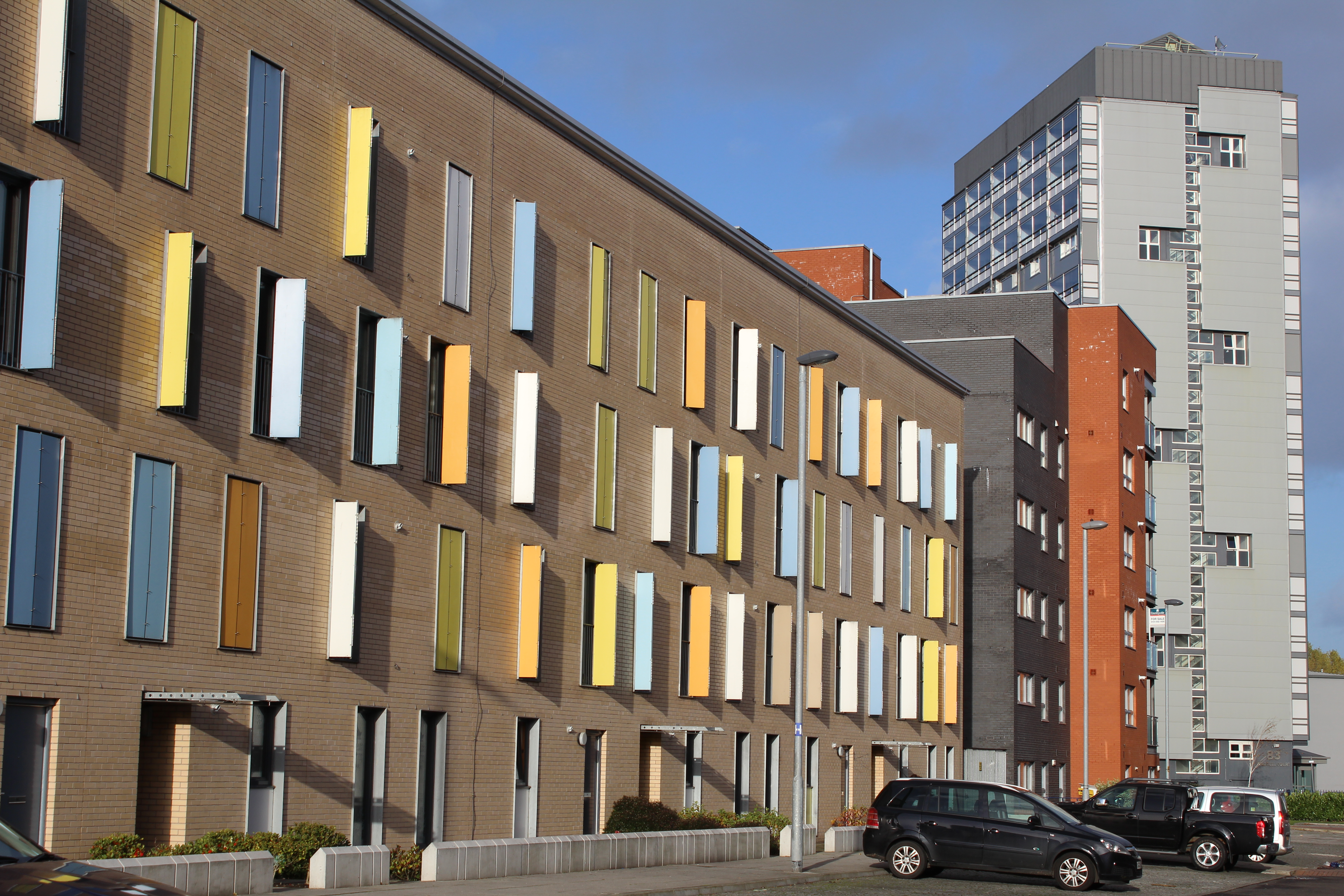
Waddell Street, 2013

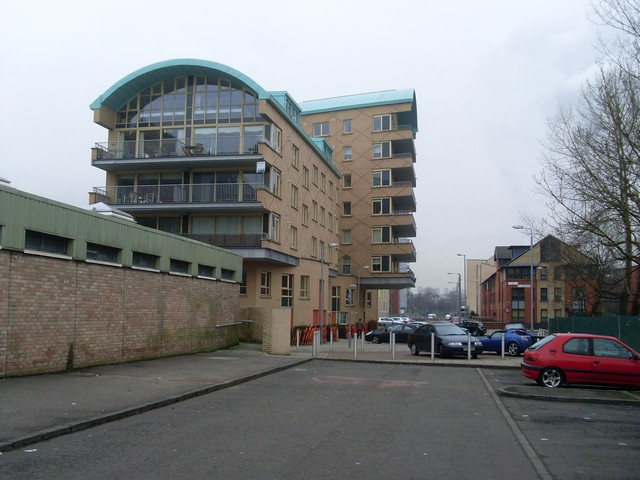
Modern apartments on the site of Queen Elizabeth Square

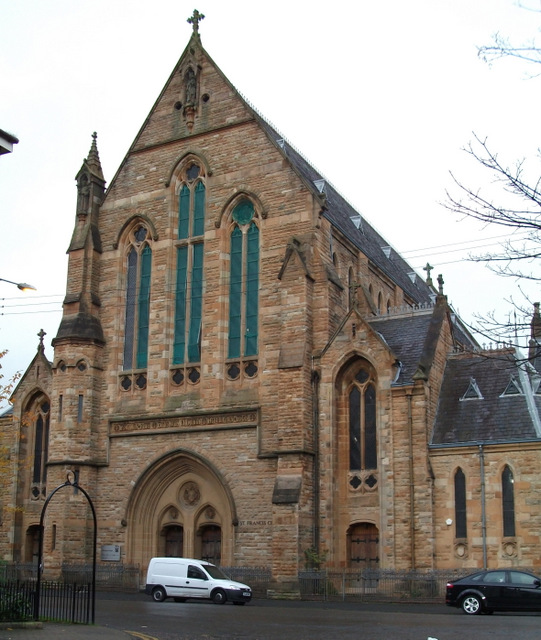
19th-century St Francis Church, in 'Hutchie C' area but spared from the wrecking ball, now a community centre, 2012

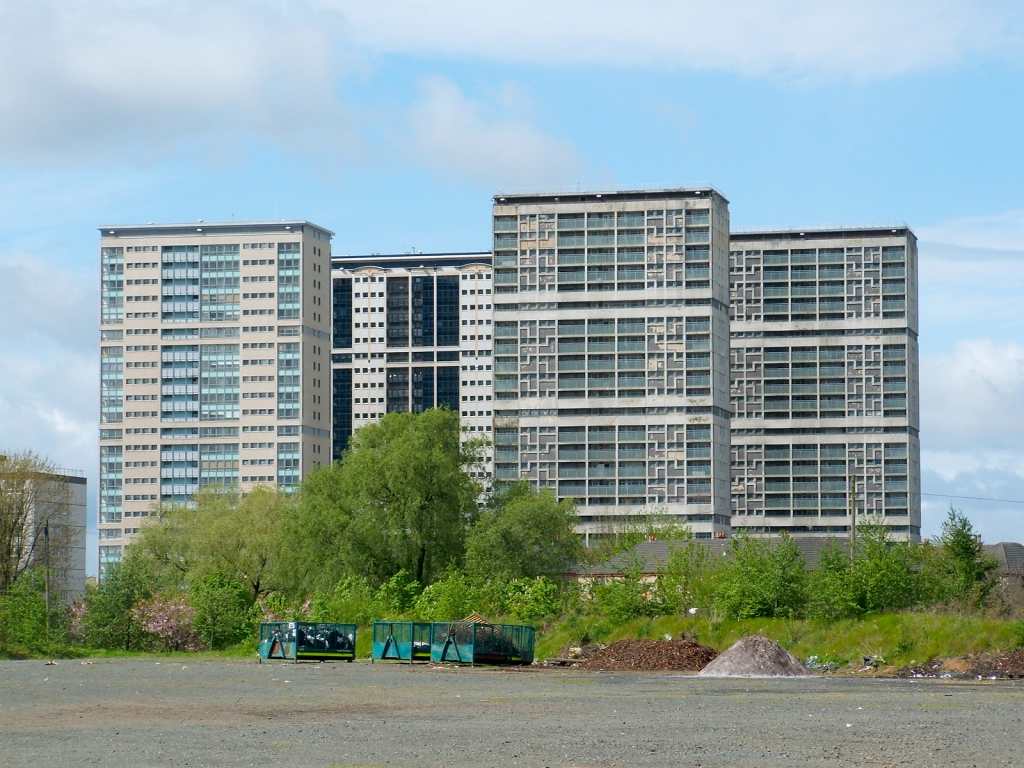
'Hutchie D' tower blocks in 2005, shortly before the demolition of two on right (Old Rutherglen Road and Cumberland Street)

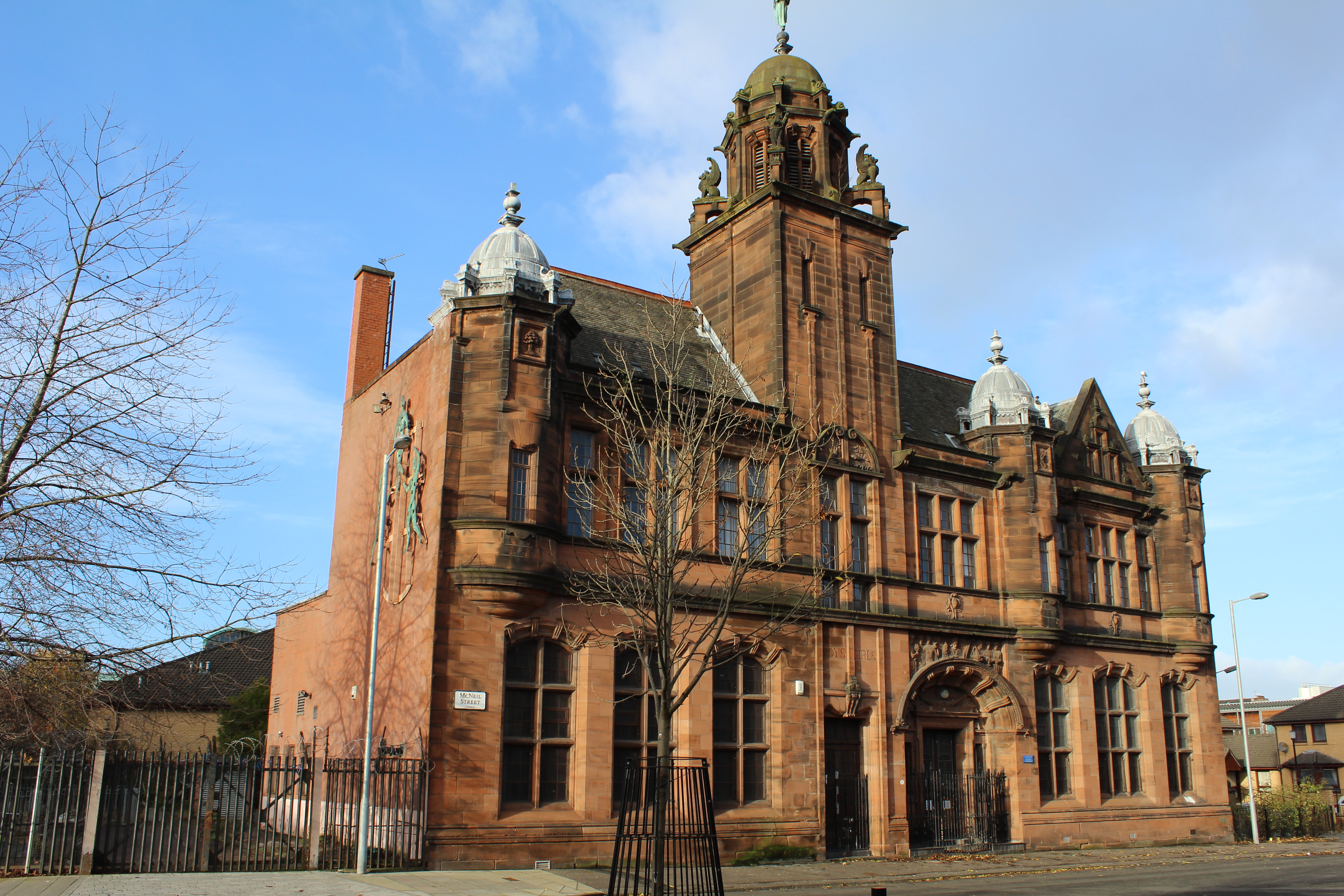
Gorbals Training Centre, McNeill Street (formerly Hutchesontown Library), 2013

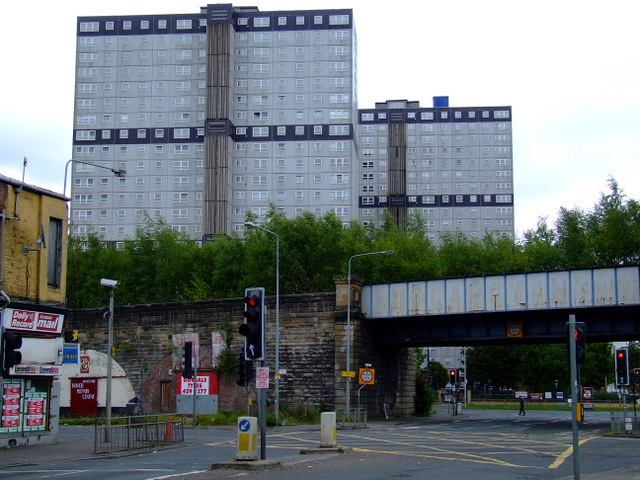
Sandiefield Road towers ('Hutchie E'), 2011

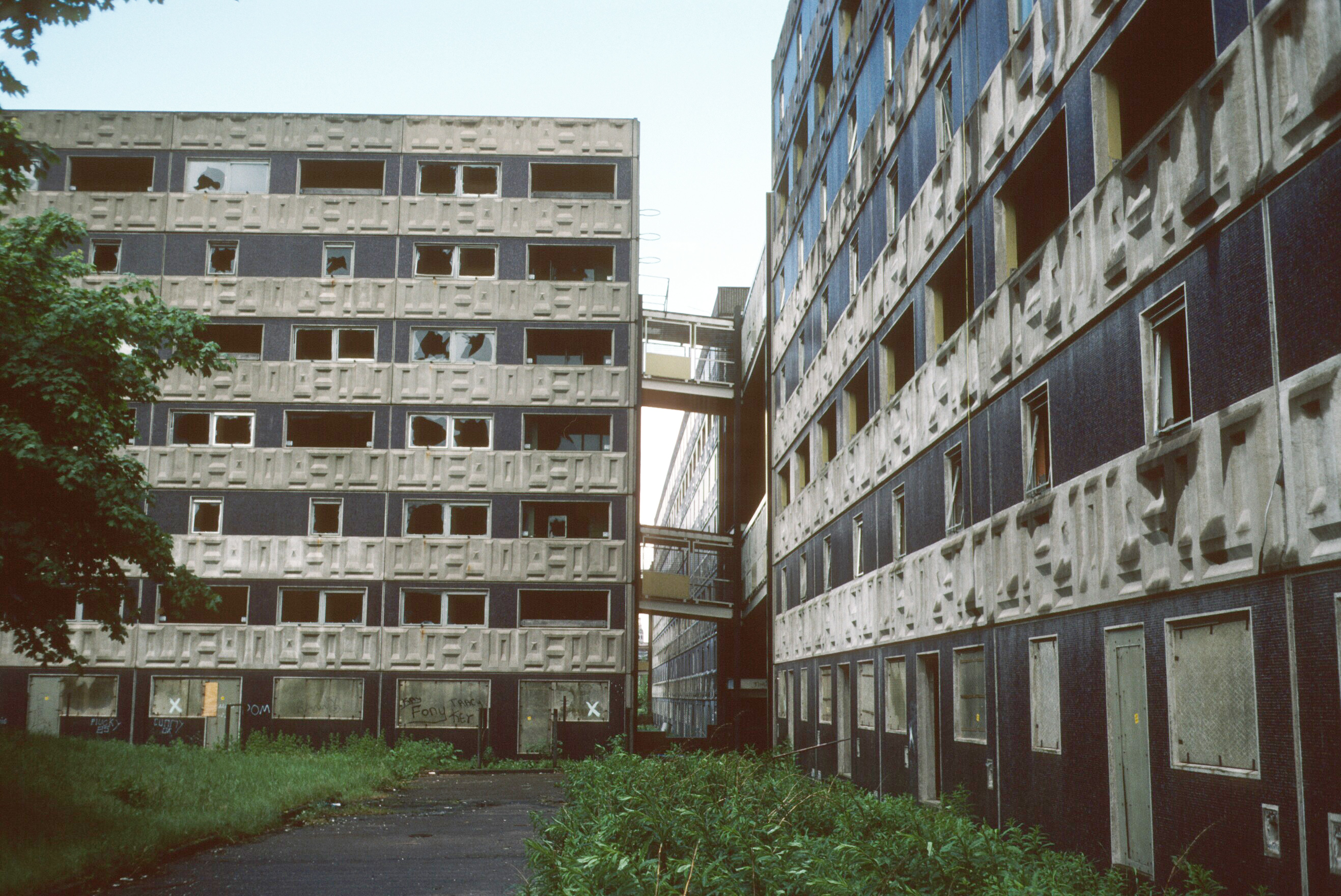
Low-rise Area "E" flats in 1987, shortly prior to demolition

== See also ==
- Glasgow tower blocks
- List of tallest voluntarily demolished buildings
