= A749 road =

Road in Scotland

A749

Route information

Major junctions
- South end: East Kilbride; 55.7759°N 4.1633°W
- North end: Glasgow; 55.8564°N 4.2438°W

Location
- Country: United Kingdom
- Constituent country: Scotland
- Primary destinations: East Kilbride; Nerston; Rutherglen; Glasgow Cross

Road network
- Roads in the United Kingdom; Motorways; A and B road zones

The A749 road in Scotland connects East Kilbride with Glasgow city centre via Rutherglen and Bridgeton.

== Route ==
=== East Kilbride ===
The road starts off as a dual carriageway at a roundabout called "The Whirlies", with a junction for the A725 road. Running north it quickly meets another roundabout for the A749 spur which connects onto the A725 (added in the 1990s to bypass the Whirlies where possible to ease congestion); another exit provides access to the former Rolls-Royce engineering works, which closed in 2010s and was converted mostly to housing to complement existing commercial and retail property. The road continues past a third roundabout with exits for the Stewartfield district (as of 2020, a proposal was in place to upgrade this to a dual carriageway for better links to the A726 on the western side of the town), and for the Kingsgate Retail Park (Nerston). After a traffic light junction the road becomes National Speed Limit, descending down a long hill flanked by fields towards Rutherglen, offering panoramic views over much of Greater Glasgow. In this rural section it is known as Glasgow Road.

=== Rutherglen ===
Around two miles north-west there is a grade separated staggered junction for the B759 road to Greenlees Road (for Cambuslang/Kirkhill) to the east followed by Cathkin Braes Road (for Carmunnock) to the west, and the permitted speed reduces to a 40-mile-per-hour limit. The junction can be dangerous due to the speeds involved, and the fact that the traffic for Cambuslang queued in the fast lane at busy times and crosses the southbound lanes, as does traffic from the B road onto the northbound carriageway. Fatalities have occurred and the construction of a new residential development in the adjacent fields led to safety measures being proposed in 2017 and introduced two years later.

The road continues on to another roundabout where it meets the end of the A730 road – the Cathkin bypass. Now known as East Kilbride Road, the A749 continues north for another brief spell as a 40-mile-per-hour dual carriageway passing the Springhall and Whitlawburn housing schemes, but soon afterwards drops to a 30-mile-per-hour zone and the dual carriageway section ends at a junction with Blairbeth Road (formerly the A730 until a re-designation upon the completion of the bypass in 2017). it travels into Burnside as East Kilbride Road until reaching Burnside railway station.

Turning north onto Stonelaw Road, it meets the start of the B762 (Dukes Road), forms the traditional 'high street' retail zone for the area, then and continues north and downhill to Rutherglen town centre, directly overlooked by houses at a few points but generally open space – two small parks, a care home complex set back from the road, and a bowling green – or civic buildings including the local health centre, a church and the converted building of Rutherglen Academy. It goes through a long-established cutting – concrete walls approximately 13 feet (4.0 m) high on either side, topped by vegetation – through higher ground known as Clincarthill on the west side and Wardlawhill on the east side, soon meeting the historic Main Street (B768) at Rutherglen Cross. Becoming the narrow Farmeloan Road, it crosses over the West Coast Main Line railway beside Rutherglen railway station, and under the elevated M74 motorway (however offers no access). A junction with the end of the A724 (Cambuslang Road) at Farme Cross results in another name change, to Dalmarnock Road; this is followed by crossing the River Clyde. Passing the Clyde Walkway, the road enters the City of Glasgow proper still heading in a northwesterly direction.

=== Glasgow ===
The road enters Glasgow at Dalmarnock and where it meets the Glasgow East End Regeneration Route (A728) at Dalmarnock railway station and continues past the B763 road (Dunn Street), then enters the Bridgeton District as Dalmarnock Road.

At Bridgeton Cross and Bridgeton railway station, the A749 label switches onto London Road (with small sections swapping designation with the A74 near to Glasgow Green) and carries on west to Glasgow city centre, passing Calton and The Barras flea market. It forms a brief part of the one-way system along with the A89 road (Gallowgate) on the eastern edge of the Merchant City.

It ends at Glasgow Cross, a grade junction with the A8 (High Street/Saltmarket); thereafter the road continues as the Trongate (historically part of the A82 road) into the heart of the city centre unclassified.

=== Public transport ===
The '18' bus service, one of the primary routes by the major operator in the region, First Glasgow, runs along the entire length of the A749 in both directions. In the first half of the 20th century, Glasgow Corporation Tramways also operated on the route, specifically the 9A which had its terminus at Burnside.
