= David Provan =

David Provan may refer to:

- David Provan (footballer, born 1941) (1941–2016), Scottish footballer who played with Rangers and Scotland
- David Provan (footballer, born 1956) (born 1956), Scottish footballer who played with Celtic and Scotland
