= Bridgeton, Glasgow =

District in Glasgow, Scotland

Coordinates: 55.8500°N 4.2218°W

Bridgeton: Scottish Gaelic: Baile na Drochaid; Scots: Brigtoun
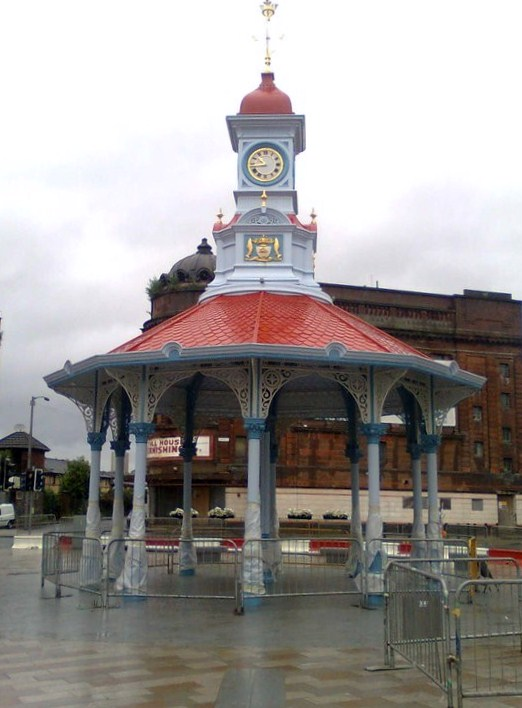
- Bridgeton Umbrella

- Location within the Glasgow City council area Location within Scotland
- OS grid reference: NS610641
- Council area: Glasgow City
- Lieutenancy area: Glasgow
- Country: Scotland
- Sovereign state: United Kingdom
- Post town: GLASGOW
- Postcode district: G40
- Dialling code: 0141
- Police: Scotland
- Fire: Scottish
- Ambulance: Scottish
- UK Parliament: Glasgow East
- Scottish Parliament: Glasgow Central

Bridgeton (Scots: Brigtoun, Scottish Gaelic: Baile na Drochaid) is a district to the east of Glasgow city centre. Historically part of Lanarkshire, it is bounded by Glasgow Green to the west, Dalmarnock to the east and south, Calton to the north-west at Abercromby Street/London Road and Broad street to the north-east.

== History ==
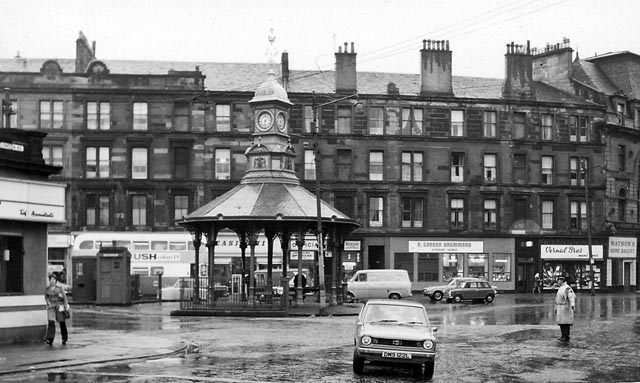
1974 image of Bridgeton Cross

It started as a small weaving village in 1705, when the third John Walkinshaw marked out a portion of his Goosefauld estate for rent. However, not much interest was shown until 1776 when Rutherglen Bridge was built over the River Clyde and the area became known as Bridge Town (or Brig Toun in Scots). The area was incorporated into the city of Glasgow officially in 1846. A major employer was carpet manufacturer James Templeton & Co. Bridgeton used to be bounded by a village named Mile-End to the north, however this district seems to have vanished over the years, resulting in Bridgeton's boundary moving north to Crownpoint Road.

== Bridgeton Cross ==
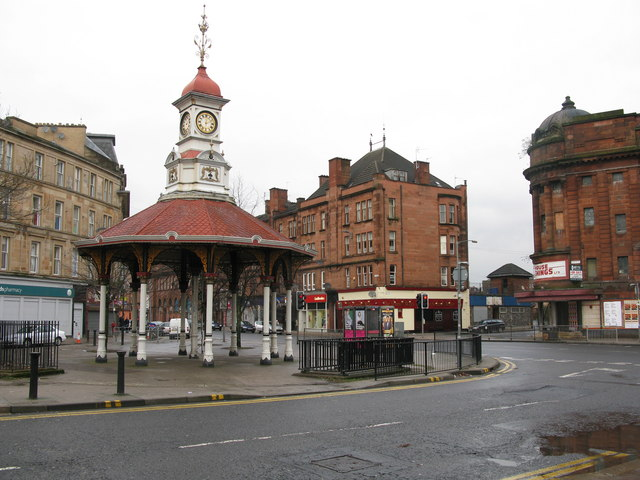
Bridgeton Cross with the Bridgeton Umbrella, former station building (background centre) and Olympia theatre (right) prior to renovation work.

Bridgeton Cross, also known as 'The Toll', is a major junction, the meeting point of London Road (A74 towards Celtic Park), Dalmarnock Road (A749), Main Street, James Street (leading to Glasgow Green), Olympia Street and Orr Street.

The intersection is notable for the Bridgeton Umbrella, a Victorian (1875) cast iron bandstand covering the centre of the Cross. The Category A listed landmark structure and surrounds was renovated in the early 21st century, resulting in improved public realm areas and the complete refurbishment of the Umbrella.

Bridgeton Cross is the location for Bridgeton railway station (opened in 1895, closed in 1964, reopened in 1979) which is on the Argyle Line connecting the area to central Glasgow. The Category B listed building which previously housed Bridgeton Central railway station (1892–1979) is a short distance away. A number of local buses also pass along London Road and Dalmarnock Road.

The Cross is also the location for the Olympia Theatre (built 1911), which after lying abandoned for many years has undergone rebuilding and reopened in 2012 as a library and community facility for the people of Bridgeton. There are several public houses in the vicinity, with most themed around Rangers F.C.

In 1893 William Millard started Millers Linoleum Stores, renting sheds in Charles Street (now Olympia Street) from the North British Railway Company. On 26 June 1913 planning permission was granted to build a two-storey warehouse on this land, which had now been purchased by Millard. Under the directorship of William's great-grandson David Millard, the building was sympathetically renovated in 2013. Believed to be the only surviving family business from the 1800s in the area, Millers 1893 continues to operate.

== Points of interest ==
Bridgeton has one of Glasgow's original Carnegie libraries, designed by the Invernesian architect, James Robert Rhind. Since 2014, the library has been in use by the Glasgow Women's Library, holding a lending library, archive and museum collection, who have made significant renovations both inside and out.

After the 2014 Commonwealth Games was held in Glasgow, Bridgeton now has international-class sporting facilities within walking distance: the Commonwealth Arena and Sir Chris Hoy Velodrome are located in nearby Dalmarnock, with the Crownpoint Sports Complex, a modern outdoor athletics track, also located in the area adjacent to St Mungo's Academy.

Bridgeton has been the centre of the Orange Order in Scotland. Their marches are a fairly common sight in Glasgow during the summer months but reach a peak around the Twelfth of July when the parades commemorating the Battle of the Boyne are in full flow. In 2019, the Sunday Times reported that concerns over an incident during the 2018 Apprentice Boys of Derry (Bridgeton) march had led to suggestions that Glasgow council reroute the march to avoid passing near two Catholic churches.

The Glasgow Vintage Vehicle Trust, one of the largest voluntary commercial and passenger vehicle preservation groups in Scotland are based at Bridgeton Bus Garage which opened on 5 June 1965 on a site bordered by London Road to the south, Fordneuk Street to the West, Broad Street to the north and Rimsdale Street to the east. It replaced the former tram depot at Dalmarnock which had suffered fire damage. In 1870 a grocer by the name of John Wilson of 13 Main Street and a few friends from the local bowling club founded Bridgeton Burns Club, a charity which continues to this day, assisting local children.

Bridgeton's use as a Glasgow Bus Garage was brief, the tendency was to use a smaller fleet of larger buses and that led to the garage being closed in 1976, however it was then taken on by Strathclyde Regional Council for its Internal Transport fleet, servicing everything from light vans to Gritting Lorries. In this capacity it later passed to Glasgow City Council who when they ceased using it for that purpose were prevailed upon to rent it out for vehicle preservation.

== Football ==
For four decades in the mid-20th century, Bridgeton was represented in the Scottish Junior Football Association by Bridgeton Waverley F.C. Initially a local Juvenile team, upon joining the Junior setup they played at Shawfield Stadium (home of Clyde F.C.), then moved to Barrowfield Park which was bought and demolished by Glasgow Corporation for the construction of the housing scheme of the same name in the 1930s. Waverley then moved to New Barrowfield on the edge of the Parkhead district. After they folded in the 1960s, that site became the training ground of Celtic F.C.

Another Junior club which became defunct around the same time, Strathclyde F.C., was also based in the area. Strathclyde's predecessor senior league club Thistle F.C. had their roots in Bridgeton/Dalmarnock, as did the aforementioned Clyde and the 19th century side Eastern F.C. who both once played at another Barrowfield Park.

Although Celtic's stadium is nearby the district is now known for its Rangers following.

== Notable people ==
- Elky Clark, boxer
- Jim Diamond, singer and musician
- Lonnie Donegan, skiffle musician
- Bobby Dougan, footballer
- Don Greenlees, footballer
- David Hayman, actor
- Lorraine Kelly, TV presenter
- Archie Kyle, footballer
- Hugh MacDonald, journalist
- Billy Mack, actor
- Henry May, recipient of the Victoria Cross
- Lorraine McIntosh, singer with Deacon Blue
- Frankie Miller, rock musician
- Willie Miller MBE, footballer
- William Sheret, showjumper
- Jim Watt, boxer
- John Paul Young, singer
- Rev William John Thomson (born 1852 in Ireland) Free Church minister of Bridgeton 1879 to 1882. The only known minister "loosed" (fired) for constant intoxication.

== See also ==
- Glasgow tower blocks
- Sectarianism in Glasgow
