= Metal Bridge, County Durham =

Hamlet in County Durham, England

Coordinates: 54.70914°N 1.53902°W

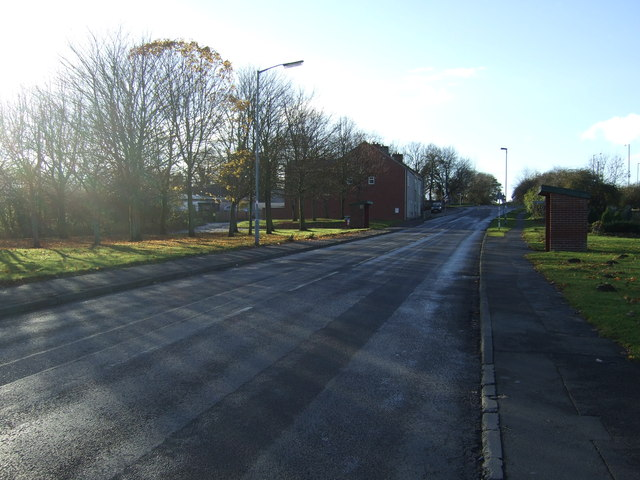
Bridge Street, Metal Bridge

Metal Bridge is a hamlet in County Durham, England, situated a few miles south of Durham. The East Coast Main Line runs directly through Metal Bridge but trains do not stop.

Metal Bridge is situated within the civil parish of Ferryhill. The boundary with Croxdale and Hett parish is immediately to the north, between the hamlet and the A688 road.
