= Shawfield =

Area of Rutherglen, Scotland

Coordinates: 55.833°N 4.223°W

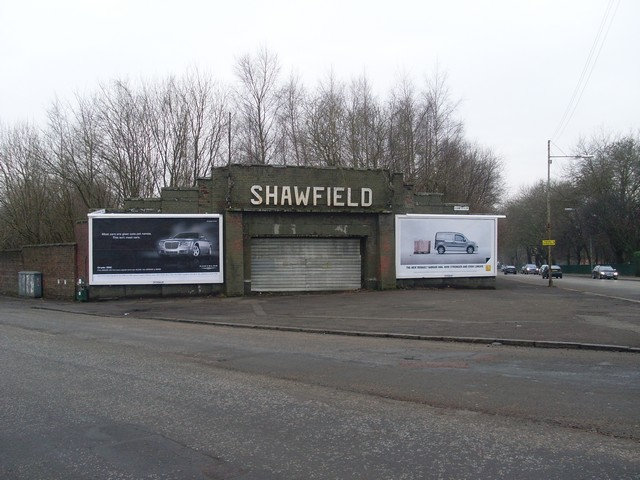
- Old entrance to Shawfield Stadium, at the north of the stadium, at the junction of Shawfield Road and Shawfield Drive, 2009

- Location within Scotland Shawfield (Scotland)
- OS grid reference: NS60749622
- Country: Scotland
- Sovereign state: United Kingdom
- Post town: GLASGOW
- Postcode district: G73 1
- Dialling code: 0141
- Police: Scotland
- Fire: Scottish
- Ambulance: Scottish
- UK Parliament: Rutherglen and Hamilton West
- Scottish Parliament: Rutherglen

Shawfield is an industrial/commercial area of the Royal Burgh of Rutherglen in South Lanarkshire, Scotland, located to the north of the town centre. It is bordered to the east by the River Clyde, to the north by the Glasgow neighbourhood of Oatlands and the adjacent Richmond Park, to the south-west by Glasgow's Polmadie and Toryglen districts, and to the south-east by Rutherglen's historic Main Street and its Burnhill neighbourhood, although it is separated from these southerly areas by the West Coast Main Line railway tracks and the M74 motorway. A road bridge connects Shawfield to the Dalmarnock, Bridgeton and Glasgow Green areas.

Shawfield is a familiar name to many Scottish sports fans, as the stadium of that name is the national venue for greyhound racing and the former home of Clyde F.C.

== Early history ==
Documentation states that in 1611 the estate of Shawfield was in the hands of the family of Claud Hamilton. His grandson James Hamilton was forced to sell the estate and it was later possessed by the Member of Parliament and tobacco lord Daniel Campbell in 1707. He built a mansion in the centre of Glasgow also named Shawfield, but this was destroyed in a tax-related riot in 1725. Campbell received compensation from Glasgow for the mansion as city officials were found to have encouraged the rioting mob. He used this money to buy the entire island of Islay which his family held for over a century. Shawfield in Rutherglen also remained a possession of the Campbell family (including Walter Campbell of Shawfield) until 1788.

In 1821, Shawfield House was listed as the place of death of noted chemist Robert Cleghorn, who may have been there in connection with the fledgling business of that nature described below.

== J & J White Chemicals ==
J & J White Chemicals, also referred to as Shawfield Chemical Works, was established in 1820 by brothers James and John White (each suffixed hereafter with 'I' for clarity as there were various 'J Whites' connected to the family enterprise) after a soap business on the same site, in which John White I was a partner from 1810, had failed. John White I had also purchased Shawfield estate and its policies including Shawfield House and Hayfield, and in the following years the business flourished, particularly in the manufacture of bichromate of potash, with their premises expanding over the previously rural estate.

Subsequently John White I’s sons, John White II and James White II, took over. With the family’s homes in Rutherglen now part of the chemical processing facility, in 1859 James White II purchased land near Dumbarton for a grand new mansion far from the atmosphere of the works: Overtoun House was built in 1862. By the time of James White II's death in 1884 the works employed 500 in Rutherglen and had an output similar to all other such businesses in Britain combined.

The ownership thereafter passed to the son of James White II, John White III and his cousin William James Chrystal.

=== Lord Overtoun and Keir Hardie ===
John White III was strongly religious and involved in numerous philanthropic concerns. He also became involved in politics and in 1893 became a peer in the House of Lords as Baron Overtoun, alternatively "Lord Overtoun", taking the name from his family’s estate. However his reputation for godliness and upstanding generosity was tarnished in 1899 by the figurehead of the Labour Movement, Keir Hardie, to whom the employees had turned for help regarding their situation after appeals to management and an attempted strike had proved unsuccessful.

Hardie produced a series of pamphlets entitled White Slaves: Chrome, Charity, Crystals and Cant describing in scathing terms the terrible working conditions and the demands on the workforce at Shawfield works – the pay was far lower than in comparable occupations of the time, and the owners demanded 12-hour shifts without a meal break and a seven-day working week (although in his other guise as a prominent churchman, Lord Overtoun campaigned for strict Sunday observance including the cessation of public transport for recreational purposes).

However the most damning evidence was linked to the effects on the workers’ health. Safety regulations introduced in 1893 had been ignored, and ineffective protective equipment in unventilated sheds left the employees exposed to the harmful chemical dust at all times. In the short term this led to widespread perforation of the septum in their noses and ‘chrome holes’ (ulcerations burnt into the flesh), as well as lung cancer, digestive disorders and skin diseases over longer periods. The exact number of workers affected is unknown due to unreliable figures and reluctance among authorities of the time to acknowledge and document any direct link between the chrome dust and the health dangers. The exposure to the dust was such that the workers were referred to locally as ‘White’s Dead Men’ or ‘White’s Canaries’ due to their bleached faces and yellow chrome dust-covered clothing. The pamphlets proved very popular and exposed the conditions at Whites works to the wider public. Another Glasgow tycoon of the day Thomas Lipton received similar treatment from Hardie in response to practices at his facilities.

According to the Oxford Dictionary of National Biography: "There was no effective rebuttal of the charges and Overtoun stood accused of hypocrisy, not least because his passionate sabbatarianism did not extend to closing his chemical works on Sundays. While Overtoun was somewhat distanced from the daily running of the Rutherglen works, it was impossible for him to escape some of the odium for conditions in a third-generation family firm of which he was sole proprietor."

Soon afterwards, improvements in the works were introduced, including baths and recreational facilities on-site, although the sanitary issues were addressed to a satisfactory standard only after a further damning report into Whites by the Medical Inspector of Factories Thomas Morison Legge.

=== Twentieth century ===
Despite the criticism of the situation at his chemical works, in 1905 Lord Overtoun was made a freeman of Rutherglen after he donated land to the town for a public park - this was named Overtoun Park. Lord Overtoun/John Campbell White III died in 1908, by which time the Shawfield works were the largest of their kind in the world.

William Chrystal took full control of the firm until his own death in 1921. By the mid-1920s the works, now controlled by another cousin in the White family, Hill Hamilton Barrett (died 1934), employed around 900 and the site had expanded further, to 30 acres.

In 1953 the firm merged with Eaglescliffe Chemical Company from County Durham and became British Chrome and Chemicals. In 1958 the company was renamed Associated Chemical Companies. It was bought over by Albright and Wilson in 1965 and the Shawfield works closed down; the chain of companies producing chemicals (although no longer at any locations in Scotland) continues with Elementis.

=== Toxic legacy ===
Although production of chemicals at Shawfield ceased in the 1960s, the impact on the Rutherglen area due to the activities of J & J White lasted for decades afterwards due to the presence of the carcinogenic by-product hexavalent chromium (Chromium VI) produced at the works. Its dangers were highlighted in the Hollywood movie Erin Brockovich.

The 12-acre (7 ha) area set aside within the confines of the Shawfield works for waste (coincidentally the same as that bequeathed to the town by Lord Overtoun for the public park – giving some idea as to the size of the area in question) proved inadequate due to the output volume.

In the early 1990s, surveys carried out on blaes playing fields due to be built on for a nursing home revealed dangerously high levels of hexavalent chromium. Further investigations confirmed that J & J White Chemicals had been routinely discarding up to 2.5 million tonnes of their waste materials (Chromate Ore Processing Residue, COPR) at locations around Rutherglen, Cambuslang and Glasgow (such as Carmyle) for many years, and at the time this was permitted. These sites were often old quarries or mines requiring suitable landfill for reuse.

=== Known sites ===
The most prominent dumping ground identified was an area of parkland and playing fields on a former quarry in the Eastfield district adjacent to two main roads, which was fenced off and lay abandoned for a decade before suitable decontamination could be carried out. This land was well known to locals and was casually referred to as 'The Toxic'. A new park and a housing development were laid out on the site, but concerns in the community are such that the alarm was raised immediately when attempts were made to carry out test drilling for sewer works in 2014. Other sites either confirmed or strongly rumoured to have been contaminated with COPR – most of which are now believed to have been sufficiently decontaminated – include:

- the Eastfield burn to the south of The Toxic park at Dukes Road (now a small park area)
- the playgrounds of the first incarnation of Trinity High School, also in Eastfield (once a quarry, now the site of the new school and sports facilities)
- the playing fields at Overtoun Park in Rutherglen (now a nursing home)
- the site of Rutherglen Maternity Hospital adjacent to the playing fields (once a mine, hospital from 1977–1998, now the local health centre)
- open ground at the north of the Burnhill district across the railway lines from Shawfield (now the new stadium for Rutherglen Glencairn F.C. as well as a local sports centre)
- blaes playing fields on both sides of Prospecthill Road, Toryglen in Glasgow (once a brick works, now a supermarket and football training centre)
- spectator banking at Lesser Hampden football ground
- Morriston Park estate in Cambuslang (now a supermarket and housing development)
- Rosebery Park football ground in Oatlands (now the Glasgow East End Regeneration Route)
- the former Phoenix Tube Works (latterly Stewarts & Lloyds, at Farme Cross) – it is thought the COPR material had been in another area and was then discarded at this derelict site when the issues became apparent (now a retail park)

The issue was highlighted in some detail by the then MP Tommy McAvoy during a debate in the House of Commons in 1995. However, a study published in 1999 and a further study in 2000 suggested there was little evidence that those living in areas contaminated with COPR suffered from poorer health than those in unaffected areas.

=== Effects at Shawfield ===
Within Shawfield the contamination was at its worst. In the late 1960s all visible traces of the works – including Shawfield House which had survived the 150 years of intense industrial activity by serving as an administrative building within the complex – were removed and an industrial estate was constructed in its place. The tenants included factories concerned in food preparation such as the Scottish base of Greggs. However at that time the extent and the severity of the chromium contamination was not known.

The spectator bankings of Southcroft Park, the original ground of Glencairn FC, were formed with chromium waste to a significant extent.

The waste ground to the rear of the stadium also had a very high level of contamination, which caused great concern as this land fell along the exact route due to be taken by the M74 motorway and would lead to the chemicals being disturbed.

The COPR permeates the water table due to its prolonged existence in the soil, with polluted water entering Clyde tributaries the Cityford/West Burn and the Malls Mire/Polmadie Burn (which run along the western side of the site, largely underground) and thereafter flowing into the main river. This may also have led to vegetation at affected sites absorbing the contamination. In 2019, it was observed that the pollution from the residual COPR in the Polmadie Burn was still present to the extent that the water turned green, causing the matter to be discussed by local politicians. Glasgow City Council stated in response that the substance was only of risk if people came into direct contact with the contaminated water, and that measures had been taken to redirect the West Burn into the Clyde before it joined the Polmadie Burn (which has open sections within a public park), reducing the potential for exposure. Two years later the burn was found to have turned bright yellow.

== Twenty-first century ==
Due to the contamination issues at Shawfield, an expensive and comprehensive cleanup operation – anticipated to last 20 years – is ongoing to allow the large site to be utilised safely in the future. Most of the abandoned warehouses have been dismantled. Although Greggs bakers left the area in 2007, moving to new modern facilities in Cambuslang, other businesses remained including a sizeable Arnold Clark Automobiles showroom/servicing centre, which eventually closed in early 2021 with the site quickly cleared for decontamination.

The project, operated by Clyde Gateway, will allow high value business and industrial units to be installed, with favourable road links to central and eastern Glasgow (via Rutherglen Bridge) and access to the motorway network. The agency came under scrutiny for its financial dealings relating to the site in 2013.

The Clyde Gateway projects aims to reinvest in this region and create new business parks and make the River Clyde accessible in Rutherglen once again. The town's old port is accessible where the railway line passes over the riverside path; this area is overgrown. The presence (since 1894) of a sewage treatment plant just across the river does not add to the aesthetic appeal of the area.

A new (2015) administrative headquarters for Police Scotland on the Glasgow side of the river at Rutherglen Bridge is one of the most recognisable new premises. The first building of the new development within Shawfield, the flagship Red Tree Magenta business centre, was completed in 2018 and formally opened the following year with good tenancy uptake levels.

Further investigations found that the levels of Chromium VI at the zone to the west of Glasgow Road were five times greater than at the cleared east zone near to the new bridge, and would require more intensive remediation treatment to address.

The Morris furniture firm, in operation since the 1900s (initially based in Cowcaddens, then at Castlemilk from 1990 followed by the Oatlands end of Shawfield from 2000) was once famed for providing fittings in luxury ocean liners, but was also at the centre of a bitter industrial dispute in the 1980s, and further controversy occurred in the 2000s when they were awarded substantial compensation payments for relocation due to the M74 motorway. By 2015, the third-generation owner Robert Morris closed down and sold on the furniture aspect of the business, but four years later completed the first phase of a new 'Morris Park' business centre adjacent to their old premises. A temporary concert venue, Junction 1, was set up within the grounds of Morris Park for the summer season in 2022 but issues were encountered, including multiple complaints from nearby residential areas regarding excessive noise, the cancellation of several acts at short notice, and delays in refunding customers for cancelled shows.

=== Shawfield Smartbridge ===
A new pedestrian bridge with associated landscaping has been constructed between Shawfield and Dalmarnock (a project related to the 2014 Commonwealth Games) to encourage people working in the area to make use of the nearby Dalmarnock railway station; the bridge also carries communications and power connections over the river.

== T B Seath & Co Shipbuilders ==
Another industry in the area was shipbuilding as exemplified by T.B. Seath & Co. which operated between the 1850s and the 1900s.

== Sports ==
In the early 21st century, the completion of the M74 motorway cut through the area resulting in the demolition of some industrial units as well as Southcroft Park, the historic home of Glencairn FC, forcing the team to relocate its playing facilities to Burnhill – although the social club was rebuilt at the original location.

There was also a Junior team named Shawfield F.C.; however their stadium Rosebery Park (also contaminated with industrial waste and also demolished in the motorway construction) was in Oatlands.

A further amateur football team named Shawfield Amateurs competed in the Scottish Cup on several occasions. Details on this team are scarce but they appear to have been the works team of J & J White Chemicals as there were recreational facilities amidst the industrial buildings, and the team disbanded around the time the business left Rutherglen.

Shawfield Stadium (the former home of Clyde F.C. for over 80 years) was the home of greyhound racing in Scotland for many years. Although not immediately noticeable, the building has Art Deco features. In 2022, with the venue unused for two years following the COVID-19 pandemic, it was reported that the owners were looking to redevelop the site for housing, pending the results of an environmental report on the contamination there.

Shawfield is also home to the West Of Scotland Indoor Bowling Club situated across from the stadium, and Flip Out, a large indoor trampolining facility (claiming to be the world's largest) based in a former furniture warehouse next to the motorway.
