= King's Bridge, Glasgow =

Bridge in Glasgow, Scotland

King's Bridge
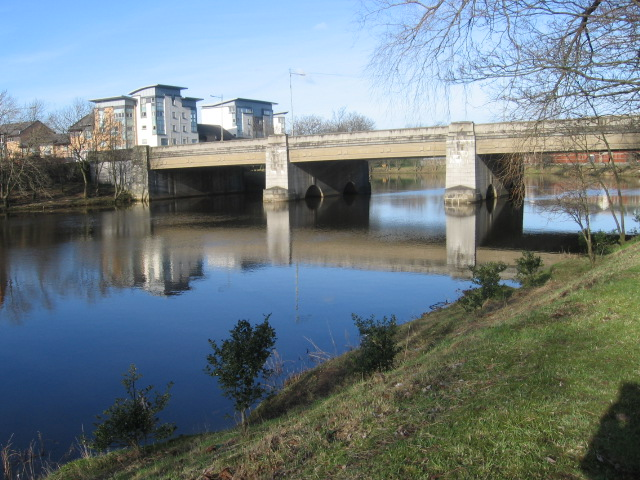
- Coordinates: Bridge spanning the River Clyde in Glasgow55.846825°N 4.23745°W
- Carries: A74
- Crosses: River Clyde
- Locale: Glasgow

Location
- Interactive map of King's Bridge

King's Bridge, which carries the A74, is the second such structure crossing the river at that point. The original was wooden and completed in 1901, opening on the same day as the original Polmadie Bridge nearby. The current, wider version was built in 1933 and has four 21-metre spans containing a series of rivetted steel plate girders which support the reinforced concrete bridge deck. With deep foundations, the piers divide at low level to create the arches. The bridge is a low-level bridge and was built by the Sir William Arrol & Co. firm to a design by TPM Somers.

== See also ==
- List of bridges in Scotland

Next bridge upstream	River Clyde	Next bridge downstream
Polmadie Bridge	King's Bridge; Grid reference NS6000663771	St. Andrew's Suspension Bridge
