= Metal Bridge, Cumbria =

Settlement in Cumbria, England

Coordinates: 54.9740°N 3.0054°W

Metal Bridge
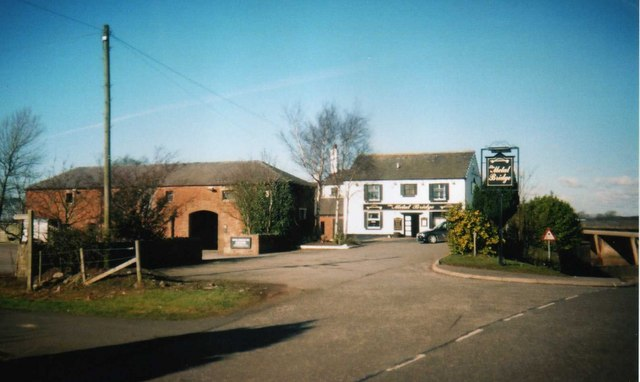
- Metal Bridge Inn

- Location in the former Carlisle district, Cumbria Location within Cumbria
- OS grid reference: NY356648
- Civil parish: Rockcliffe; Westlinton
- Unitary authority: Cumberland
- Ceremonial county: Cumbria
- Region: North West
- Country: England
- Sovereign state: United Kingdom
- Post town: CARLISLE
- Postcode district: CA6
- Dialling code: 01228
- Police: Cumbria
- Fire: Cumbria
- Ambulance: North West
- UK Parliament: Carlisle

Metal Bridge is a small settlement in Cumbria, England between Carlisle and Gretna, formerly on the main A74 road.

The settlement consists of a few properties clustered around a public house (now a restaurant) of the same name, on the south bank of the River Esk, in a corner of Rockcliffe parish.

The settlement and pub (and nearby forest plantation) derive their name from the Thomas Telford designed metal bridge that spanned the river at this point on the road to Scotland.

The M6 motorway extension opened in December 2008 and bypasses the village, replacing the A74 road dual carriageway as the main route across the Scottish border.
