= Oatlands, Glasgow =

Area of Glasgow, Scotland

Coordinates: 55°50′23″N 4°14′03″W

Oatlands
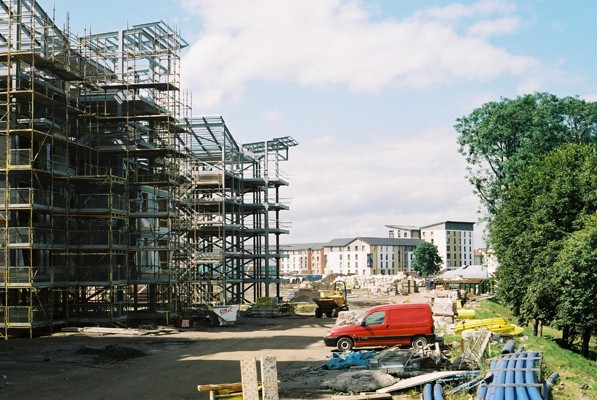
- New apartments on Haughview Terrace

- Location within Glasgow
- Population: 1,827 (2018)
- Council area: Glasgow City Council
- Lieutenancy area: Glasgow
- Country: Scotland
- Sovereign state: United Kingdom
- Post town: GLASGOW
- Postcode district: G5
- Dialling code: 0141
- Police: Scotland
- Fire: Scottish
- Ambulance: Scottish
- UK Parliament: Glasgow Central
- Scottish Parliament: Glasgow Southside

Oatlands is an area in the city of Glasgow, Scotland. It is situated south of the River Clyde, falls within the Southside Central ward under Glasgow City Council, and is part of the Gorbals historic area. Its boundaries are Hutchesontown and the Southern Necropolis cemetery to the west, Polmadie to the south (across the M74 motorway and West Coast Main Line railway), Shawfield (part of the town of Rutherglen) to the east, and Glasgow Green public park to the north (across the River Clyde).

Oatlands is connected to the Green via Polmadie Bridge which was dismantled in 2015 due to structural safety concerns and replaced in 2018.

== History ==
Until the 1990s, the area was characterised by four-storey red sandstone tenements built at the end of the 19th century and the start of the 20th, and three-storey Rehousing (low build quality) grey reconstituted stone tenements from the 1930s. A continuous line of tenements faced Richmond Park – a typical large urban park with boating pond, opened in 1899 and named after the Lord Provost of the time, Sir David Richmond whose tube works were located nearby – across busy Rutherglen Road, one of Glasgow's main arterial routes.

Notable features included a small cinema and a place of worship designed by John Honeyman, known as the Buchanan Memorial Church and later St Bonaventure's RC Church (after being used as a factory); its associated schools were sited just off the main road at the western end of the neighbourhood (the secondary school was extended and renamed as John Bosco Secondary School in the 1970s) with the nondenominational Woseley Street Primary School and the local 'steamie' (washhouse) also nearby. By the mid-1990s, almost all of these amenities had either been knocked down or were scheduled for demolition along with the housing, the main exception being St Margaret's Church which was earmarked as the site of a new community centre, but its conversion was delayed by various factors including the poor condition of the building.

Richmond Park School, a specially designed facility for children with physical disabilities, was built on the site of Woseley Street School, but its roll merged with Kelbourne School in the west end of the city in 2009, in spite of protests by parents and staff. The intention was to move pupils from another ASN school, Hampden School in Toryglen, into the Richmond Park site, and this process was accelerated when the existing Hampden buildings were subject to an arson attack in 2010. The Oatlands facility was subsequently renamed Hampden School and is the only educational provision in the area.

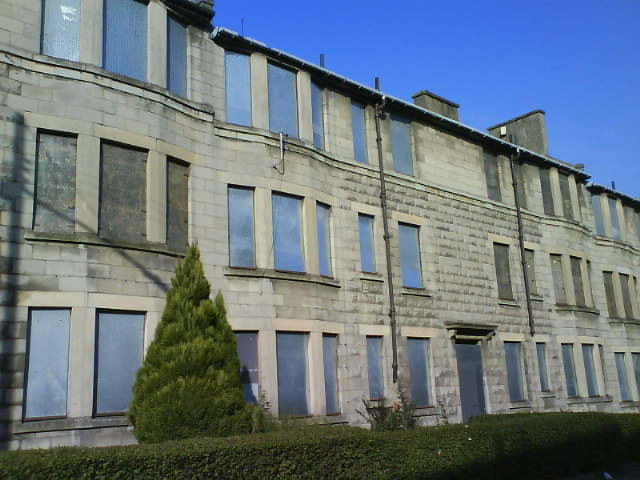
'Rehousing' tenements in Granton Street awaiting demolition (2008)

After a long process of demolitions –beginning with the red sandstone tenements which had been redeveloped just a few years earlier, leading to more problems being created than solved – in April 2005 work started on a comprehensive redevelopment scheme to create a new neighbourhood consisting of around 1,510 houses (1,217 or 81% new private and 293 or 19% for social rental, 213 of which are new). The award-winning project was promoted by Glasgow City Council, the lead developer being Bett Homes (later Avant Homes) with involvement from the Link and Glasgow Housing Associations, the local housing stock of the latter now being owned and managed by the New Gorbals Housing Association. By September 2007, part of the traffic by-pass (including a new Boulevard), 44 private houses and 172 social-rented dwellings had been constructed.

Progress was severely impacted by the Great Recession from 2007 onwards, however the walkway by the River Clyde, linking to Hutchesontown, was reopened in 2011. Also at that time, the M74 extension motorway project was completed, with a junction serving Oatlands. Part of the land clearance in the area (including the removal of the derelict Rosebery Park football ground) had been for the construction of the motorway and the reconfiguration of its major road to meet this new junction and connect to the Glasgow East End Regeneration Route, but had also encountered safety problems and attracted protests due to the presence in the ground of carcinogenic Chromium VI which had been dumped by a large chemicals firm that had operated nearby. That contamination also affected the burn running through Richmond Park into the River Clyde, causing the water to turn unnatural shades of green or yellow at times.

Over 500 houses had been completed by 2014, with detailed planning permission given that year for another 378 private houses. The new tenements around Oatlands Square (a name previously in use in the district's 19th century street plan, although not in the same location) involved the installation of public artwork. A steel sculpture on a prominent junction, named 'Oatlands Girl' and featuring references to the district's past, was unveiled by Nicola Sturgeon in 2016. Two allotment sites were laid out, and the Oatlands Development Trust created a new play area as the first phase of the £2 million extension and upgrading of Richmond Park. (Note: There is also another 'Richmond Park' a few miles to the east, bordering the Rutherglen neighbourhood of Eastfield; this name was familiar to Glasgow bus users as the terminus for the First Glasgow No 12 service and was the site of a large laundry throughout the 20th century (to add to the confusion, several other bus services towards Rutherglen run via Oatlands, including the 267 which passes both Richmond Parks).)

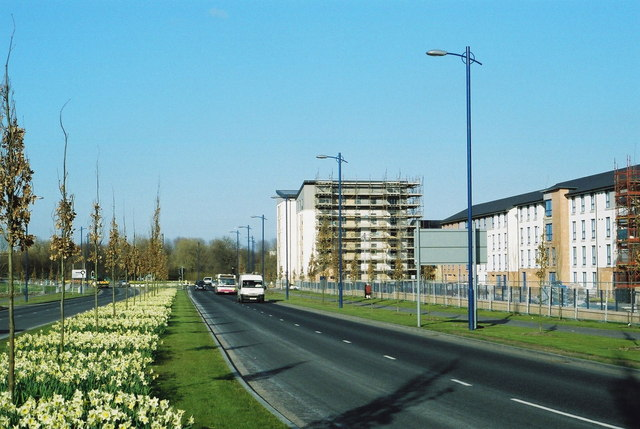
The Boulevard looking north

The diversion of Rutherglen Road to the southern edge of the site was designed to allow integration of nearly all the housing with Richmond Park. Future plans include a community centre, shop units, and school improvements. The project is almost entirely funded by Avant Homes in lieu of payment to Glasgow City Council for the land.

The regeneration project was not without controversy. For many years, redevelopment was prevented because of the risk of fire or explosion from propane stored nearby; 756 flats in red sandstone tenements were demolished after the failure of a £7 million refurbishment scheme. Attempts to regenerate the area were initially stymied by proposals for a business park and resistance from Housing Department officials. Later, although the area's character reflects the outcome of an intensive process of community engagement, the area's design is occasionally the subject of criticism by modernist architects, but signs indicate that the new Oatlands will, if completed in accordance with current plans, become one of Glasgow's more popular residential neighbourhoods.

== Notable people ==
- Jimmy Boyle, artist, reformed criminal
- James Dornan, politician
- David Holt, footballer with Queen's Park, Hearts
- Eddie Large, comedian (Little and Large), born Edward McGinnis
- Frank McLintock (b. 1939), football player and pundit (Arsenal)
- Alex Wright, footballer with Partick Thistle, East Fife; manager of St Mirren, Dunfermline Athletic, Dumbarton
