= Germiston, Glasgow =

Coordinates: 55.87277°N 4.2119°W

Germiston
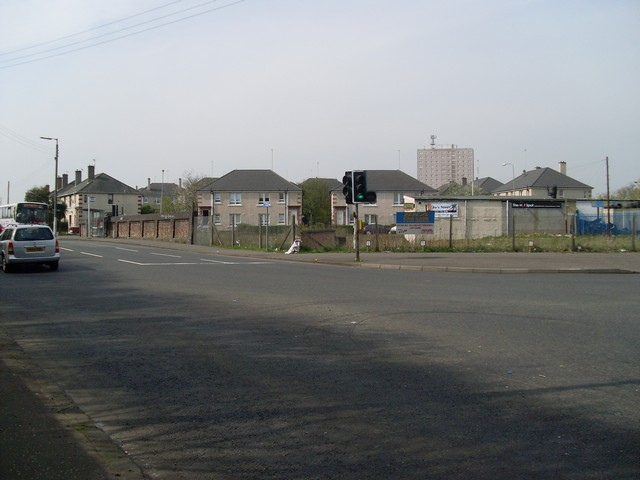
- Royston Road, Germiston at Broomfield Road looking west (2009)

- Location within Glasgow
- OS grid reference: NS617666
- Council area: Glasgow City Council
- Lieutenancy area: Glasgow
- Country: Scotland
- Sovereign state: United Kingdom
- Post town: GLASGOW
- Postcode district: G21 2
- Dialling code: 0141
- Police: Scotland
- Fire: Scottish
- Ambulance: Scottish
- UK Parliament: Glasgow North East
- Scottish Parliament: Glasgow Maryhill and Springburn

Germiston is a neighbourhood in the city of Glasgow, Scotland, north of the River Clyde.

The area forms part of the suburb of Springburn for political purposes, but is more commonly referred to as part of the 'Royston Road corridor' flanked by the Cumbernauld Line railway and the M8 motorway (previously the Monkland Canal), its location midway between Blackhill to its east and Royston (Garngad) to its west earning it a position as the 'wee sister' of both of those better-known neighbourhoods.

== History ==
It formerly centred around Germiston House, a mansion built in 1690 by Robert Dinwiddie, a tobacco lord in Virginia and father of Robert Dinwiddie, governor of Virginia, and Lawrence Dinwiddie, Lord Provost of Glasgow, both of whom were born there.

Lawrence Dinwiddie inherited the house and raised his 21 children there.

In 1864, the house was acquired by Rev Dr George Stewart Burns, minister of Glasgow Cathedral. The setting of the house was ruined by a railway line being placed beside it and it was used as housing for labourers from around 1890.

During Glasgow's growth during the Industrial Revolution, Germiston was a vital part of the city's locomotive manufacturing industry as well as sitting upon a major railway junction. Germiston Works, one of such locomotive factories was sold onto the Cape Asbestos Company, who used it to manufacture fireproof insulation materials. The plant still exists to this day, under the ownership of Promat, and now uses the safer Calcium Silicate for such material.

A narrow gauge underground railway used to exist at Germiston, but most of the path it once took has now been filled in to develop the land for house building. Its tunnel, known locally as the "Blind Tunnel", now carries a single-track road from Darnick Street Tunnel to Royston Road and Forge Street, and is controlled by traffic lights with lighting for pedestrians. It is often confused with an adjacent tunnel, which has now been blocked completely by metal fencing to prevent unauthorised access to the local Provan Gas Works. The underground railway from Germiston transported coke to Provan Gas Works for the manufacture of natural gas.

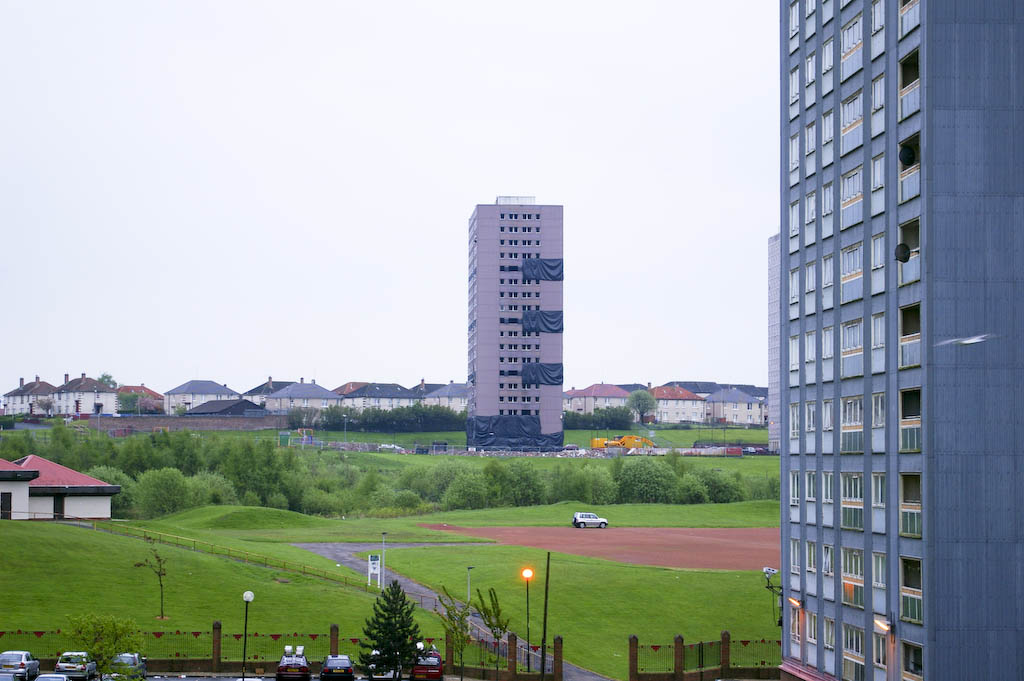
15 Forge Place, Germiston (one of the area's three tower blocks) just before demolition, 2008

From 1967, three 18-storey tower blocks were built on Coll Place and Forge Place in Germiston. The Coll Street project provided 306 new dwellings. The blocks were demolished in 1992, 2008, and 2011.

In the early 21st century, construction of private housing injected some new investment into what was a decaying area, with most residents surviving on low incomes following the collapse of local heavy industries and most of the housing stock dating from the 1930s; combined with new developments on the old railway yards on Royston Road, this has done much to breathe new life into the area.

== Education ==
Barmulloch Primary School (with its core community about one-half mile or one kilometre to the north) is located in Germiston on Forge Street, with the school previously based at that location, St Gilbert's RC Primary, having closed at the same time as the original incoming school (Berryburn Road, Barmulloch) in 2009 as part of a Glasgow City Council closure and re-alignment programme amid declining populations in both areas (St Gilbert's pupils were reassigned to St Philomena's in the Provanmill area, and to St Roch's in Royston). Barmulloch Primary is affiliated to Springburn Academy, but other local children who attend Royston Primary School would attend Smithycroft Secondary School in Riddrie, as do those from Wallacewell Primary which serves North Balornock and Robroyston further north of Barmulloch, although Riddrie is geographically closer to Germiston than Robroyston, North Balornock or Royston. Local Catholic pupils have a different issue, with those who attend St Roch's Primary transferring to the secondary school of the same name, but those going to St Philomena's Primary expected to move to All Saints Secondary in Barmulloch.

== Transport ==
Germiston is served by bus routes 19 (Glasgow - Easterhouse) run by First Glasgow, 19A (Glasgow - Robroyston) run by JMB Travel and First, and 329 (Glasgow - Stobhill Hospital via Roystonhill) run by PVT Transfer Ltd on behalf of Strathclyde Partnership for Transport.

It was formerly served by the Glasgow tram route number 2 (Polmadie - Provanmill).It was replaced with the trolleybus service 102 in 1949, which ran until 1966.

Despite the extensive rail infrastructure that shapes the area, Germiston has no passenger railway station, the closest being Barnhill.

== See also ==
- Glasgow tower blocks
