= Glasgow Corporation Tramways =

Closed urban tramway system in Glasgow, Scotland

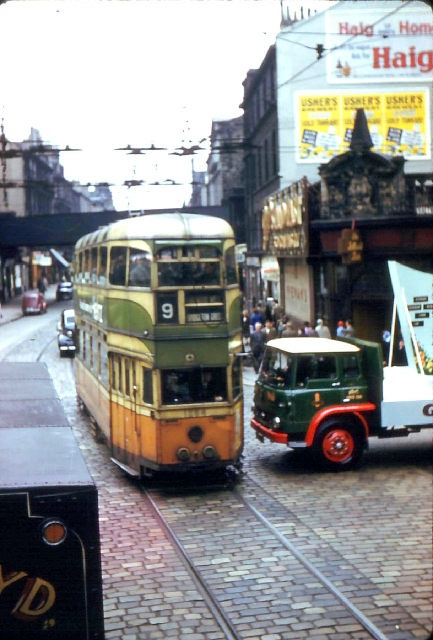
- A "Coronation" tram in Trongate, in June 1962, three months before the final closure of the system

Operation
- Locale: Glasgow
- Open: 1 July 1872
- Close: 4 September 1962
- Status: Closed

Infrastructure
- Track gauge: 4 ft 7 3/4 in (1,416 mm)
- Propulsion systems: Horse, steam and later electric

Statistics
- Route length: 141.37 miles (227.51 km)

Glasgow Corporation Tramways were formerly one of the largest urban tramway systems in Europe. Over 1,000 municipally owned trams served the city of Glasgow, Scotland, with over 100 route miles (160 route kilometres) by 1922. The system closed in 1962 and was the last city tramway in Great Britain (prior to the construction of new systems in the 1990s).

== Creation ==
Glasgow Street Tramways Act 1870
- Act of Parliament
- Parliament of the United Kingdom
- Long title: An Act to authorise the construction of Street Tramways in certain parts of the city of Glasgow and its suburbs; and for other purposes.
- Citation: 33 & 34 Vict. c. clxxv

Dates
- Royal assent: 10 August 1870
Other legislation
Repealed by	Glasgow Corporation (Tramways Consolidation) Order Confirmation Act 1905

Status: Repealed

Text of statute as originally enacted

Trams in Glasgow, filmed by the Mitchell & Kenyon film company in 1901 or 1902

The Glasgow Street Tramways Act 1870 (33 & 34 Vict. c. clxxv) was enacted by Parliament in August 1870. This legislation allowed Glasgow Town Council to decide whether or not to have tramways within Glasgow. In 1872, the Town Council laid a 2 1/2-mile (4.0 km) route from St George's Cross to Eglinton Toll (via New City Road, Cambridge Street, Sauchiehall Street, Renfield Street and the Jamaica Bridge).

The Glasgow Street Tramways Act 1870 prohibited the town council from directly operating a tram service over the lines. The act further stipulated that a private company be given the operating lease of the tram-lines for a period of 22 years. The St George's Cross to Eglinton Toll tram line was opened on 19 August 1872 with a horse-drawn service by the Glasgow Tramway and Omnibus Company. The Glasgow Tramway and Omnibus Company operated the tram-line and subsequent extensions to the system until 30 June 1894.

In declining to renew the Glasgow Tramway and Omnibus Company operating lease, Glasgow Town Council formed the Glasgow Corporation Tramways and commenced their own municipal tram service on 1 July 1894.

Large crowds took to the streets to mark the service's golden jubilee in 1922.

== Track gauge ==
Glasgow's tramlines had a highly unusual track gauge of 4 ft 7 3/4 in (1,416 mm). This was to permit 4 ft 8 1/2 in (1,435 mm) standard gauge railway wagons to be operated over parts of the tram system (particularly in the Govan area) using their wheel flanges running in the slots of the tram tracks. This allowed the railway wagons to be drawn along tramway streets to access some shipyards. The shipyards provided their own small electric locomotives, running on the tramway power, to pull these wagons, principally loaded with steel for shipbuilding, from local railway freight yards.

== Electrification ==
The electrification of the tram system was instigated by the Glasgow Tramways Committee, with the route between Springburn and Mitchell Street chosen as an experiment. With a fleet of 21 newly built tramcars, the experimental electric route commenced on 13 October 1898 and was considered a success. The citywide horse-drawn tram service was withdrawn at the end of April 1902.

An additional 400 new trams were built and fitted with electrical equipment, with the Glasgow Corporation Tramways workshops at Coplawhill (Pollokshields) heavily involved in the construction of the new trams.

To provide the electrical supply, a generating station was built at Port Dundas: the Pinkston Power Station opened in 1901. Pinkston and substations located at Coplawhill, Dalhousie, Kinning Park, Whitevale and Partick also powered the Glasgow Subway. The power station operated for 57 years, until it was handed over to the South of Scotland Electricity Board in 1958 and ceased operating in the early 1960s. The plant’s massive cooling tower, which dominated the skyline of the city, was demolished in 1977. The rest of the plant was removed the following year, and the first chimney was demolished on a Sunday in April 1978, followed by the second chimney on the following Sunday.

Following electrification, Glasgow trams were initially fitted with trolley poles to take electricity from the overhead wires. The trolley poles were later replaced with bow collectors.

== Closure ==
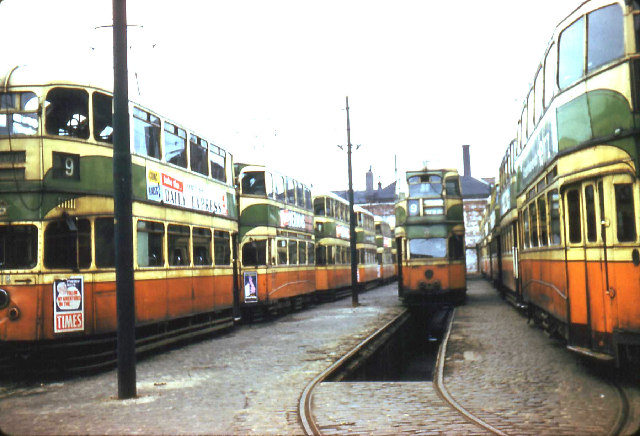
Glasgow trams in 1962, shortly before final withdrawal of services (Cunarder on the left, Coronation in middle row)

The tram system was gradually phased out between 1949 and 1962 (in favour of trolley and diesel-powered buses), with the final trams operating on 4 September 1962. By that time only one route remained in operation, the number 9 which ran from Auchenshuggle to Dalmuir. On the final day of service there was a procession of 20 trams through the city between the depots at Dalmarnock and Coplawhill, an event attended by 250,000 people. Apart from the Blackpool tramway, Glasgow became the last city or town in the UK to operate trams until the opening of the Manchester Metrolink in 1992.

One effect of the closure of the system was the loss of a rare example (for that period) of gender equality in the workplace. During World War I, the Corporation had allowed women to become tram drivers. After the war, again a very rare decision, women were allowed to continue as tram drivers. This continued until the system closed. Women were not allowed to be bus drivers; this was partly due to the physical strength required as prior to the 1970s most buses had no power steering and, especially when fully loaded, required significant strength to steer. By contrast the trams were guided by their tracks and did not require physical strength to operate. This was noted in the short film "No 9 to Dalmuir" directed by Kevin Brownlow in 1962.

In 1949 two tram lines were converted to trolleybus operation. Thereafter Glasgow developed several trolleybus routes, but these were all replaced by diesel buses by 1967.

== Legacy ==
Following the closure of the tram system, the Glasgow Corporation Tramways workshops at Coplawhill in Pollokshields were converted into the Glasgow Museum of Transport which opened in 1964. The museum was relocated to the Kelvin Hall in Yorkhill in 1987 before eventually moving in 2010 to its present home at the Riverside Museum which opened at Pointhouse in Partick in 2011, and the buildings were subsequently adapted to become the Tramway visual and performing arts venue. In 2007, plans began to relocate Scottish Ballet to its new location alongside Tramway; this entailed knocking down or renovating the five most eastern bays of the Tramway building, and it officially opened on 17 September 2009. Track infrastructure has been reused for 'tramrail bridges' in rural areas.

== Routes ==
The Glasgow system's initial network of a few lines expanded greatly in the early years of the 20th century, extending to burghs and rural areas outside the city boundaries which were soon incorporated into it (Note: Govan, Kinning Park, Knightswood, Mosspark, Partick, Pollokshaws, Riddrie, Shettleston.) as well as outlying neighbouring towns (Note: Airdrie, North Lanarkshire, Baillieston, Barrhead, Bishopbriggs, Cambuslang, Clydebank, Coatbridge, Giffnock, Milngavie, Paisley, Renfrew, Rutherglen.)

The time of the 1938 Empire Exhibition held in the city's Bellahouston Park is viewed by some as the apex of the system's timeline, with new cars recently put into service and special routes added for the exhibition, while the city was as yet undisturbed by World War II and subsequent redevelopments, with the trams winding through the dense network of tenements and factories which characterised industrial Glasgow in the first part of the 1900s, but also into some new 'garden suburb' developments with widened streets to accommodate the tracks. After the war the trams began to be phased out, although periodic reviews of routes were still conducted. Tellingly, the routes were not extended to any of the large 1950s peripheral housing schemes (Note: Barmulloch, Castlemilk, Drumchapel, Greater Easterhouse, Milton, Greater Pollok.) nor to the new towns being developed outside the city.

=== 1938 route list and map ===
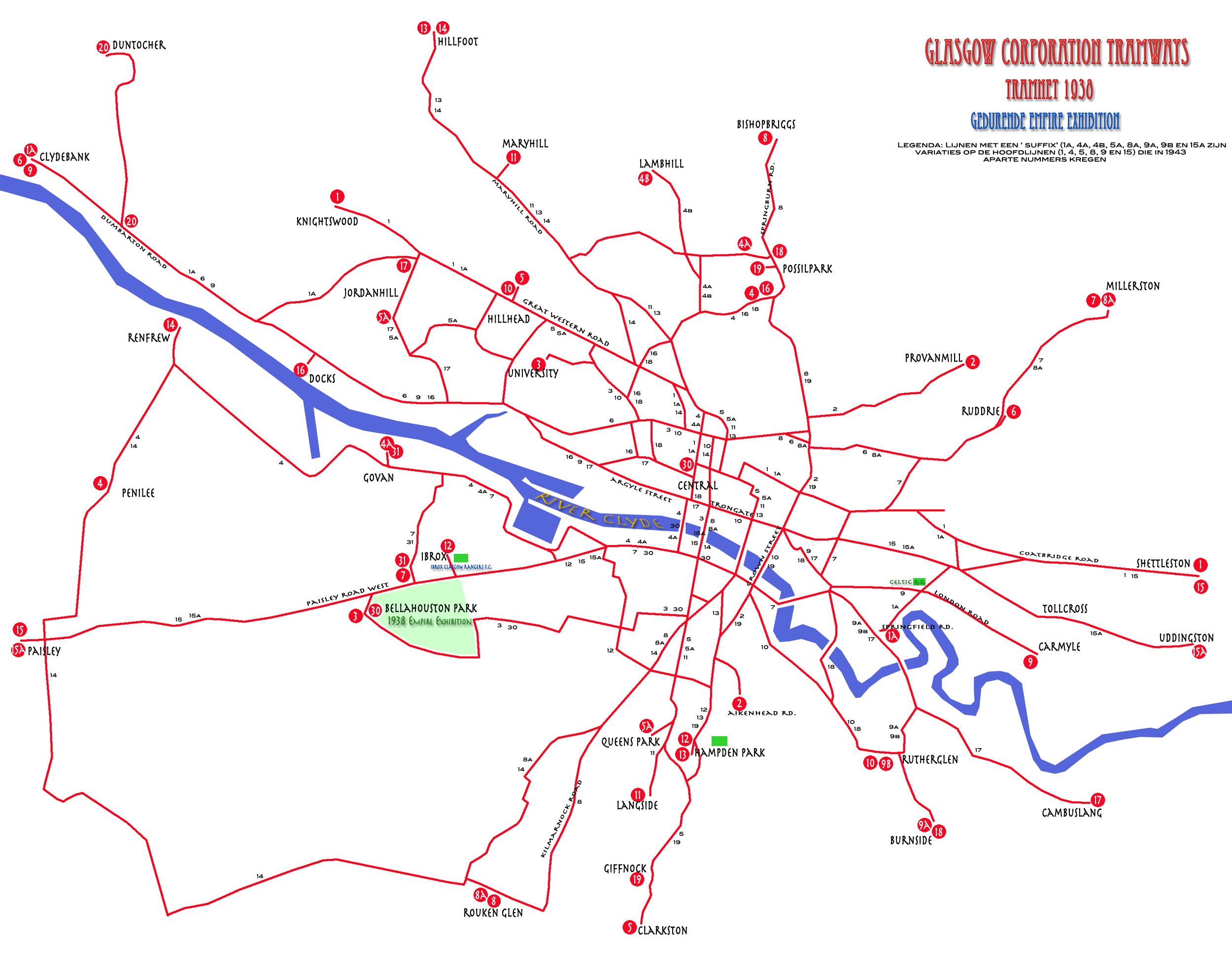
1938 Glasgow Corporation Tramways route map

Routes listed from west to east, or from south to north.

- 1: Knightswood Cross, Anniesland Cross, Great Western Road, St George's Cross), Cambridge Street, Sauchiehall Street, Hope Street, St Vincent Street, George Square (Queen Street Station), George Street, Duke Street (Dennistoun), Shettleston Road, Baillieston Main Street, Bargeddie, Coatbridge Main Street, Coatdyke, Airdrie (Clark Street).
- 1A: Dalmuir (Dumbarton Road), Clydebank, Yoker, Kingsway, Anniesland Road, then as 1 between Anniesland Cross and Haghill, then Parkhead Cross, Springfield Road, Dalmarnock (Dalmarnock Road).
- 2: Polmadie (Aikenhead Road), Cathcart Road, Gorbals (Crown Street), Albert Bridge, Saltmarket / Glasgow Green, High Street, Townhead / Glasgow Royal Infirmary (Castle Street), Garngad, Germiston, Provanmill (Royston Road).
- 3: Mosspark, (Mosspark Boulevard / Bellahouston Park), Dumbreck, Pollokshields (Nithsdale Road, Albert Drive, Maxwell Road), St Andrew's Cross, Eglinton Street, Laurieston (Bridge Street), Glasgow Bridge, Union Street, Renfield Street, Sauchiehall Street, Charing Cross, Woodlands Road, Gibson Street (University of Glasgow).
- 4: Renfrew (Paisley Road from Arkleston Road), High Street, Shieldhall (Renfrew Road), Govan Road (Linthouse, Govan Cross, Prince's Dock), Paisley Road Toll, Kingston (Paisley Road), Tradeston (Commerce Street), George V Bridge, Hope Street, Cowcaddens Street, Garscube Road (Woodside), Possil Cross, Keppochhill (Carlisle Street).
- 4A: Linthouse (Holmfauld Road), then as 4 between Govan Road and Possil Cross, then Possilpark (Saracen Cross, Hawthorn Street), Springburn (Springburn Road).
- 4B: As 4A to Saracen Cross, then Balmore Road, Parkhouse, Lambhill (Strachur Street).
- 5: Clarkston (Busby Road), Stamperland, Netherlee, Muirend, Cathcart (Clarkston Road), Holmlea Road, Battlefield, Victoria Infirmary, Crosshill (Victoria Road), St Andrew's Cross, Gorbals Street, Victoria Bridge, Glassford Street, George Square, Renfield Street, Sauchiehall Street (Charing Cross, Sandyford), Yorkhill / Kelvingrove Park), Partick / Western Infirmary (Church Street), Dowanhill (Highburgh Road), then a loop via Hyndland, Botanic Gardens (Great Western Road), Hillhead (Byres Road).
- 5A: As 5 from Victoria Infirmary to Highburgh Road, then Broomhill (Clarence Drive, Crow Road).
- 6: Dalmuir (Dumbarton Road), Clydebank, Scotstoun, Whiteinch, Partick / Western Infirmary), Sauchiehall Street (Kelvingrove, Charing Cross), Townhead (Parliamentary Road), Alexandra Parade, Haghill (Cumbernauld Road), Riddrie (Smithycroft Road).
- 7: Craigton (Jura Street), Drumoyne (Craigton Road), Govan Cross, Prince's Dock, Paisley Road Toll, Kingston, Tradeston, Laurieston (Norfolk Street), Hutchesontown (Ballater Street), King's Bridge, Glasgow Green, Bridgeton Cross, London Road, Calton (Abercromby Street), Dennistoun, Haghill, Riddrie, Smithycroft Road, (Blackhill (Cumbernauld Road), Hogganfield, Millerston (Station Road).
- 8: Rouken Glen Park (Rouken Glen Road), Eastwood Toll, Giffnock (Fenwick Road), Auldhouse (Kilmarnock Road), Shawlands Cross), Crossmyloof, Strathbungo, St Andrew's Cross, Laurieston, Glasgow Bridge, Union Street, Renfield Street, Sauchiehall Street, Parliamentary Road, St Rollox, Colston (Springburn Road), Bishopbriggs (Kirkintilloch Road, Kenmure Avenue).
- 8A: Rouken Glen Park (Rouken Glen Road), Thornliebank Main Street, Mansewood, Pollokshaws Road, then as 8 between Shawlands and Parliamentary Road, then Alexandra Parade, Haghill, Riddrie, Blackhill, Hogganfield, Millerston (Station Road).
- 9: Dalmuir (Dumbarton Road), Clydebank, Scotstoun, Whiteinch, Partick Cross, Yorkhill / Kelvingrove Park (Argyle Street), Anderston, Central Station, St Enoch Station), Trongate, Glasgow Cross, Bridgeton (London Road), Celtic Park, Auchenshuggle (Causeyside Street).
- 9A: As 9 from Scotstoun to Bridgeton Cross, then Dalmarnock Bridge, Farme Cross, Farmeloan Road, Stonelaw Road, Burnside (Duke's Road).
- 9B: As 9A to Farmeloan Road, then Rutherglen (Main Street).
- 10: Kelvinside (Great Western Road), Hillhead, Kelvinbridge, Woodlands Road, Charing Cross, Sauchiehall Street, Hope Street, Argyle Street (Central Station, St Enoch Station), Trongate, Glasgow Cross, Saltmarket / Glasgow Green, Albert Bridge, Crown Street, Hutchesontown, Oatlands (Rutherglen Road), Shawfield Stadium), Rutherglen (Main Street).
- 11: Battlefield (Sinclair Drive), Victoria Road, St Andrew's Cross, Gorbals Street, Victoria Bridge, Glassford Street, George Square, West Nile Street, Cowcaddens Street, Woodside (Garscube Road), Firhill Stadium / Queen's Cross, North Kelvinside (Maryhill Road), Maryhill (Gairbraid Avenue).
- 12: Ibrox Park (Broomloan Road), Cessnock, Plantation (Paisley Road West), Kinning Park (Admiral Street), Pollokshields (Shields Road, Nithsdale Road), Govanhill (Allison Street, Cathcart Road), Cathkin Park, Mount Florida (Hampden Park, Clincart Road).
- 13: Mount Florida (Clincart Road), Cathkin Park, Govanhill (Cathcart Road), Gorbals Cross, Victoria Bridge, Glassford Street, George Square, West Nile Street, Cowcaddens Street, Woodside (Garscube Road), Firhill Stadium / Queen's Cross, North Kelvinside, Wyndford, Maryhill (Maryhill Road), Bearsden (Milngavie Road), Milngavie (Main Street).
- 14: Renfrew (Ferry Road, High Street, Paisley Road), Paisley (Renfrew Road, Gilmour Street Station, Causeyside Street, Neilston Road), Barrhead (Cross Arthurlie Street, Main Street, Darnley Road), Nitshill Road, Jenny Lind, Thornliebank Main Street, Mansewood, Pollokshaws Road, Shawlands Cross, Strathbungo, St Andrew's Cross, Laurieston, Glasgow Bridge, Union Street, Renfield Street, Sauchiehall Street, Cambridge Street, Gartnethill, St George's Cross, Queen's Cross, Wyndford, Maryhill (Maryhill Road), Bearsden (Milngavie Road), Milngavie (Main Street).
- 15: Paisley (Ferguslie Main Road, Broomlands Street, High Street, Gauze Street, Glasgow Road), Ralston, Crookston, Cardonald, Halfway, Bellahouston Park, Ibrox, Cessnock, Kinning Park (Paisley Road West), Kingston, Tradeston, Glasgow Bridge, Argyle Street (Central Station, St Enoch Station), Trongate, Glasgow Cross, Calton, Camlachie (Gallowgate), Parkhead Cross, Westmuir Street, Shettleston, Baillieston Main Street, Bargeddie, Coatbridge Main Street, Coatdyke, Airdrie (Clark Street).
- 15A: As 15 to Parkhead Cross, then Tollcross Road, Foxley, Mount Vernon, Broomhouse (Hamilton Road), Uddingston (Glasgow Road, Main Street).
- 16: Whiteinch (Primrose Street), Partick, Yorkhill / Kelvingrove Park (Argyle Street), Finnieston, St Vincent Street, North Street, Charing Cross, St George's Road, Garscube Cross, Possil Cross, Keppochhill, Cowlairs (Springburn Road).
- 17: Anniesland (Crow Road), Jordanhill, Broomhill, Thornwood, Partick Cross, Yorkhill / Kelvingrove Park (Argyle Street), Finnieston, St Vincent Street, Bothwell Street, Hope Street, Central Station, St Enoch Station, Trongate, Glasgow Cross, Bridgeton Cross, Dalmarnock Bridge, Farme Cross, Eastfield, Silverbank, Cambuslang (Main Street / Clydeford Road).
- 18: Burnside (Duke's Road), Rutherglen (Main Street), Shawfield, Rutherglen Bridge, Bridgeton (Main Street, London Road), Glasgow Cross, Trongate, St Enoch Station, Central Station, Hope Street, Bothwell Street, Elmbank Street, Charing Cross, St George's Cross, North Woodside, Queen's Cross, North Kelvinside (Maryhill Road), Ruchill (Bilsland Drive), Possilpark (Hawthorn Street), Springburn (Springburn Road).
- 19: Netherlee (McLaren Place), Muirend, Cathcart (Clarkston Road), Holmlea Road, Mount Florida, Hampden Park, Cathkin Park, Govanhill (Cathcart Road), Gorbals (Crown Street), Albert Bridge, Saltmarket / Glasgow Green, High Street, Townhead / Glasgow Royal Infirmary (Castle Street), St Rollox (Springburn Road), Springburn (Elmvale Street).
- 20: Clydebank (Glasgow Road), Singer Works, Parkhall (Kilbowie Road), Hardgate (Glasgow Road), Duntocher (Dumbarton Road).
- 30: 1938 Empire Exhibition Special Route: Mosspark (Mosspark Boulevard / Bellahouston Park), Dumbreck, Pollokshields (Nithsdale Road, Albert Drive, Maxwell Road), St Andrew's Cross, Eglinton Street, Laurieston (Bridge Street), George V Bridge, Hope Street, St Vincent Place.
- 31: 1938 Empire Exhibition Special Route: Craigton (Jura Street / Bellahouston Park), Drumoyne (Craigton Road), Govan Cross, Elder Park, Linthouse (Holmfauld Road).

== Rolling stock ==
=== "Room and Kitchen" cars ===
Glasgow's first purpose-built electric trams were 20 bogie single deck vehicles with a central entrance, entering service in 1898. They were not successful and lasted only 8 years in service, however one (car no. 672) was converted to a mains testing car and was subsequently restored to its original condition for preservation in Glasgow's Riverside Museum.

=== Former horse cars ===
The electrification of the Glasgow system was rapid and the city needed cars quickly to fill the demand. 120 of the best horse car bodies were placed on new 4-wheel underframes with the same trucks and electrical equipment as the standards. They lasted until around World War I, although one (car no. 92) survived until the 1930s, having been converted into a single-deck one-man-operated car for use on the Finnieston – Stobcross and then Paisley – Abbotsinch services.

=== Standard cars ===
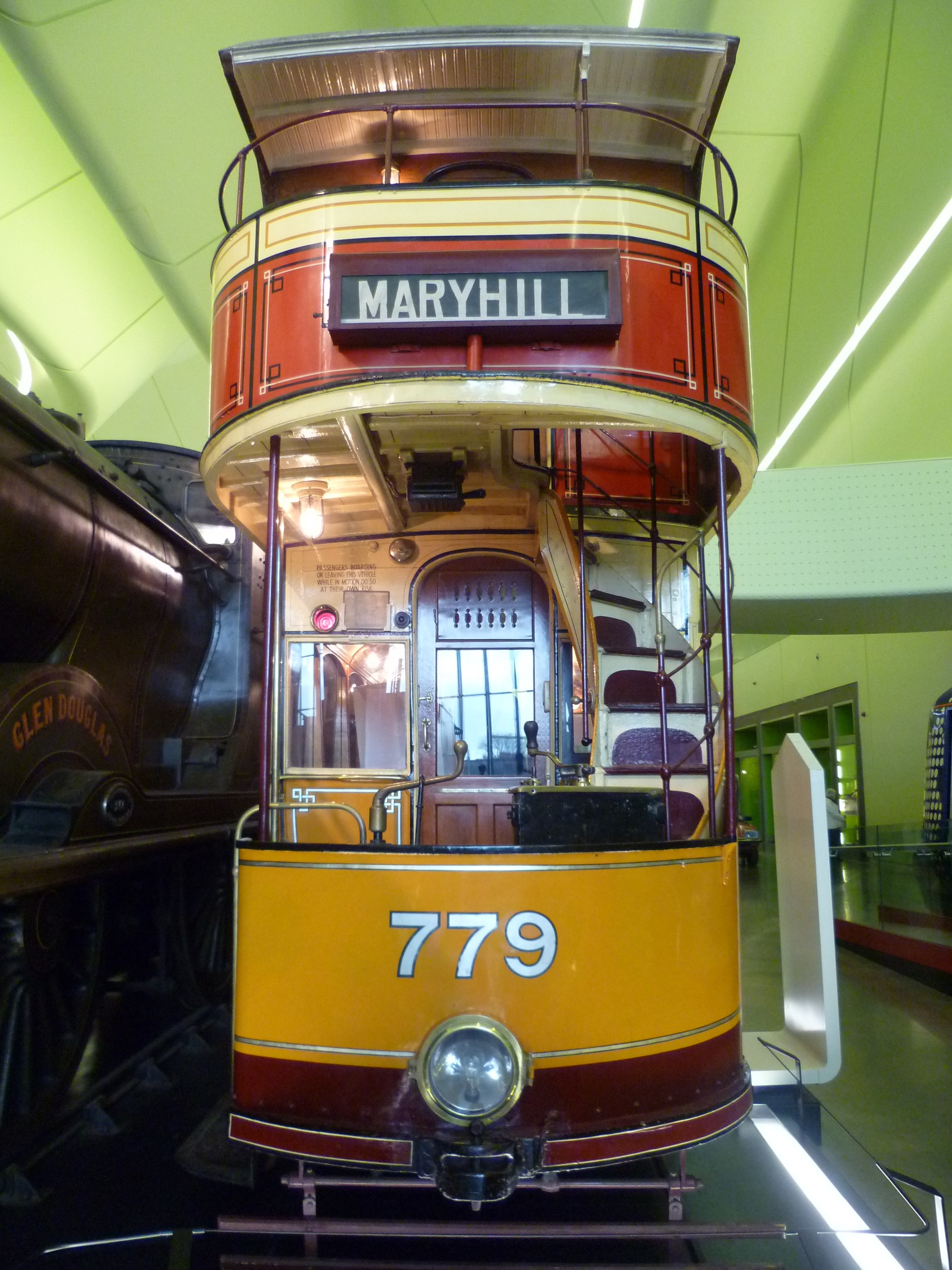
Glasgow Standard (round dash) tram with top cover

These four-wheeled, double-deck tramcars were the mainstay of the Glasgow tram fleet from electrification until the late 1950s (only being withdrawn due to the imminent closure of the system). Over 1000 were built between 1898 and 1924. They were progressively modernised in four phases, although not all went through each phase. The first cars were open-top unvestibuled four-wheelers (phase one). They then received top covers with open balconies (phase two), platform vestibules and roll-top draught covers (phase three) and finally fully enclosed top covers (phase four). Electrical equipment and running gear was also upgraded at each modernisation phase. The earlier cars had rounded front dash panels, but later cars which were built with vestibule glazing from new had hexagonal profile dash panels. When early cars were upgraded to receive vestibule glazing they retained their round dash panels, and latterly the main visual difference within the fleet was between the "round dash" and "hex dash" variants. A few cars were also cut down to single deckers for use on the Clydebank - Duntocher route which passed under low railway bridges.

Six examples of the Standard car are preserved: Nos. 779 and 1088 in Riverside Museum; nos.22 and 812 at the National Tramway Museum in Crich; no. 585 stored in the Science Museum at Wroughton; and no. 488 undergoing restoration for display at the East Anglia Transport Museum.

=== Former Airdrie & Coatbridge cars ===
Glasgow purchased Airdrie and Coatbridge Tramways at the end of 1921 and its 15 cars were taken into stock as nos. 1073 to 1087. These were double deck trams dating from 1904–05 and all were withdrawn by the end of 1934.

=== Former Paisley cars ===
Glasgow purchased the Paisley District Tramways Company in 1923 and inherited its fleet. They were numbered into the Glasgow system by adding 1000 to their Paisley number, becoming nos. 1001 to 1072. Most of the fleet were small open-top double-deckers. Some of them were cut down and used for the Duntocher route in Clydebank. The more modern cars were upgraded to a similar specification to the Glasgow Standard cars with fully enclosed roofs, and the last of these were withdrawn in 1953. Three former Paisley cars are preserved: No. 1068 at Crich; no. 1016 undergoing restoration at the Glasgow Bus Museum; and single-deck conversion no.1017 at Summerlee (Coatbridge).

=== "Bailie Burt's Car" ===
The one-off bogie single deck car (no. 1089) was built in 1926 for evaluation on longer distance interurban routes where traffic was being lost to privately operated motor buses. It was later used on the Duntocher service and for shipyard workers' extras. It is now preserved in the Riverside Museum.

=== "Kilmarnock Bogie" cars ===
After the Corporation constructed two prototypes (no.1090 built new and no. 142 rebuilt from a Standard car), an order for 50 new 'Maximum Traction' trams was placed in the mid-1920s (nos. 1091 to 1140). These were delivered in 1927-1929 and resembled an elongated version of the hex-dash Standard trams, but with eight wheels (two four-wheeled bogies) and four-bay saloons with larger windows. The production batch were constructed by four different manufacturers to a common design, but all used bogies ordered from the Kilmarnock Engineering Company (hence the nickname). These eight-wheeled trams were restricted to several comparatively straight routes to avoid the risk of derailing on tight curves. Car no. 1100 was rebuilt in 1941 with streamlined ends resembling the later Coronation class. Both no. 1100 and a more typical example of the type (car no. 1115) are now preserved at Crich.

=== "Coronation" cars ===
By the mid-1930s Glasgow Corporation had spent a substantial amount of money modernising its fleet of Standard cars, but even so the Glasgow tram fleet was becoming increasingly dated and unattractive. Other British cities had taken decisions to either abandon or modernise their tramway systems. The Empire Exhibition at Bellahouston Park in 1938 would also require additional vehicles to transport the expected visitors. Glasgow Corporation therefore built two prototype streamlined bogies cars in 1936 and 1937. Car no. 1141 featured EMB bogies and a body with 5 window bays, whereas no. 1142 had Maley & Taunton bogies and a 4-bay body. Both had different interiors which were far more luxurious than any earlier Glasgow tramcars.

Following evaluation of these prototypes 150 production cars (nos. 1143 to 1292) were built at Coplawhill between 1937 and 1941. These used the 4-bay body, but with EMB bogies and interiors based on that of car 1141, and became known as the Coronation class due to their appearance in the year of the Coronation of King George VI. They were built to a very high specification and were described as the finest short stage carriage vehicles in Europe.

A further six cars were constructed in 1954 on secondhand bogies salvaged from a Liverpool depot fire (nos. 1393 to 1398). These featured slightly modified bodies and more austere interiors, as did several earlier Coronations which received replacement bodies as a result of accidents or war damage.

Four Coronation cars are preserved: No. 1173 at Riverside Museum; no.1245 at Summerlee; no. 1274 at the Seashore Trolley Museum in Maine, USA; and no. 1282 at Crich.

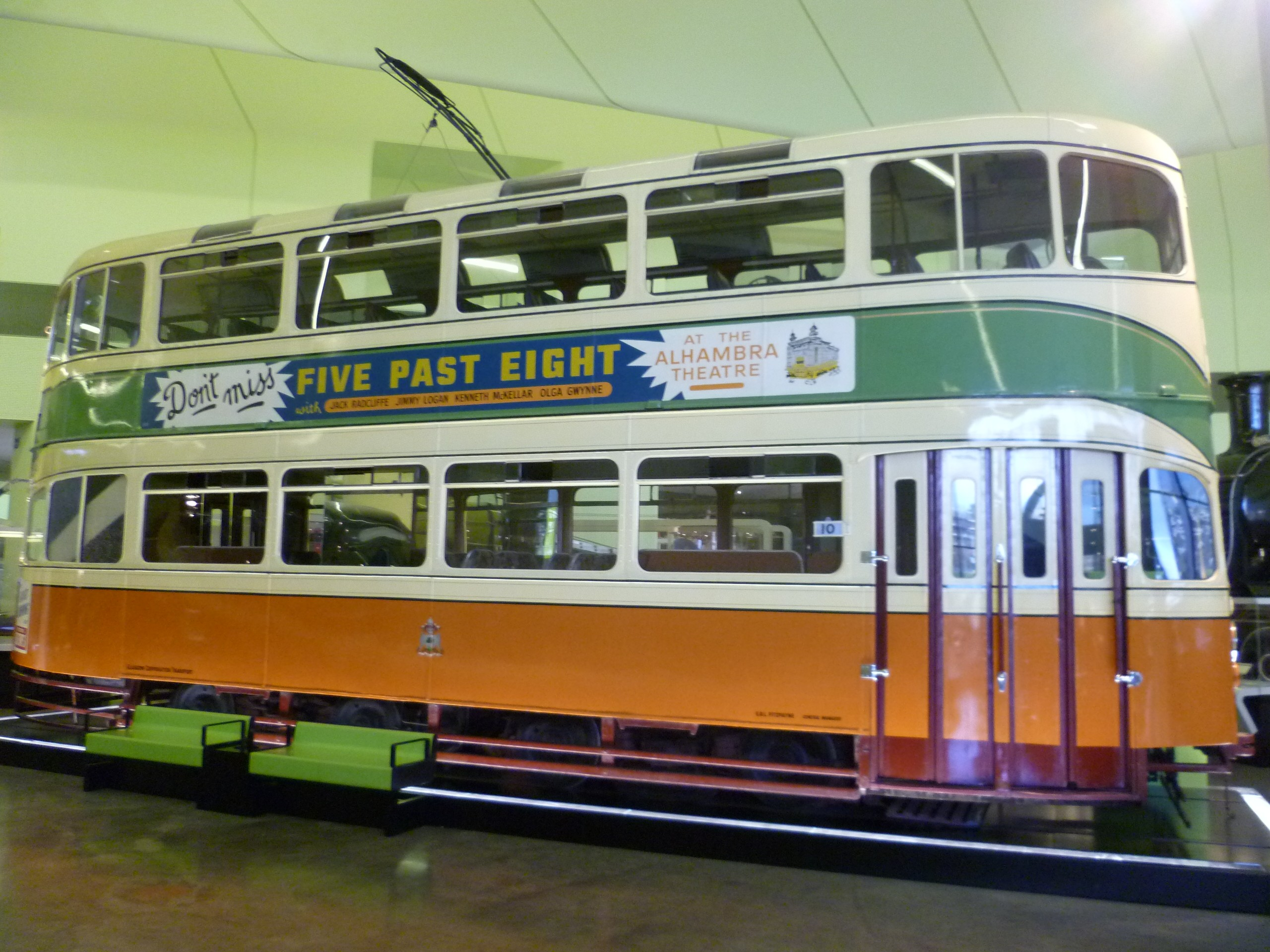
Last British-built double-decker, Cunarder car no.1392

=== Lightweight 4-Wheel cars ===
Although the Coronations were very highly regarded, they were expensive to build and operate and were not suitable for routes with tight curves, so a cheaper alternative was considered. Four experimental 4-wheel cars were built in 1939–40 (nos. 1001 to 1004) and more would likely have followed had it not been for the Second World War, which prevented large scale fleet renewal. One additional lightweight car (no. 6) was built in 1943 as a replacement for a Standard car which had been destroyed in the Clydeside Blitz. They spent most of their lives working Paisley area local services, but after the closure of the Paisley routes in 1957 they were mainly used on Govan shipyard workers' extras. All five were scrapped in 1959.

=== Experimental One-Way car ===
The first new tram after the war was an oddball built in 1947 to test the practicality of trams with separate entrances and exits (as opposed to the norm of both boarding and alighting taking place at the rear platform, with the front offside platform not used). The resultant car (no. 1005) was a bogie double decker with a driving cab at one end only, and both doors on the nearside. The car was therefore confined to circular services where it did not need to reverse direction. Initially passengers were supposed to board at the front and alight at the rear, but as every other tram in the fleet was rear-entrance this was confusing to passengers and the entrance/exit doors were subsequently reversed, although some passengers still attempted to alight at the rear. Ultimately the experiment was not judged to be successful, but aside from its novel layout no. 1005 was also effectively a prototype for the subsequent Cunarder cars. In 1956 it was rebuilt as a conventional bi-directional car resembling a Cunarder, in which form it lasted until 1962.

=== "Cunarder" cars ===
One hundred Coronation mk.II or "Cunarder" bogie cars were built between 1948 and 1952 as nos. 1293 to 1392. The Cunarders were fairly similar in design to the Coronations, with notable differences being their slightly less angular bodywork and the provision of route number indicators above the side window of the cabs rather than on the front of the tram (which made them easier to read in a line of trams). Though comfortable, they were not regarded as being as quite as reliable or capable as the Coronation trams.

Car no. 1297 is preserved at the National Tramway Museum in Crich, whilst no. 1392 (the very last all-new double deck car built in the UK) is preserved in Glasgow's Riverside Museum.

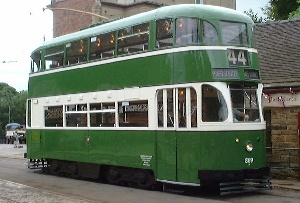
A "Green Goddess" tram (Liverpool Corporation no. 869) preserved at the National Tramway Museum

=== The Green Goddesses: ex-Liverpool trams ===
In 1953 and 1954, with the impending closure of Liverpool's tram system (in 1957), 46 of that city's relatively modern streamlined bogie trams were purchased by Glasgow Corporation to replace some of the ageing Standard cars. The acquired cars had been built in 1936-37 and were contemporaries of Glasgow's own Coronation trams, with which they were inevitably compared. At 36 feet (11.0 m), they were 2 feet (0.6 m) longer than the Coronations; accordingly they were normally confined to only two routes (15 and 29) with relatively few sharp curves. They were not wholly successful in Glasgow as their original construction had not been as robust as that of the Coronations, and with the running down of the Liverpool system they had been allowed to deteriorate into a poor condition. They therefore gave only a few more years service in Glasgow and the last was withdrawn in July 1960, more than two years before the final closure of the tramway system. One Green Goddess (Liverpool no. 869 / Glasgow no. 1055) is preserved at Crich in Liverpool livery.

Glasgow rejected an offer from Liverpool to purchase more Green Goddesses or the newer four-wheeled version, known as "Baby Grands". Glasgow had also rejected an earlier offer from London Transport for its surplus E3 type tramcars.

=== Preservation ===
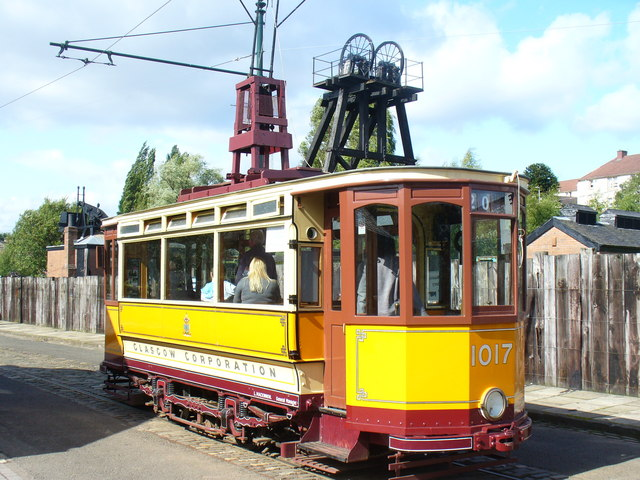
Preserved Glasgow tramcar in operation at the Summerlee Museum of Scottish Industrial Life

Some of the rolling stock was preserved and the largest collection can now be found at Glasgow's Riverside Museum, including the only remaining horse-drawn tram. Seven Glasgow trams can also be seen at the National Tramway Museum in Crich.

The Summerlee Museum of Scottish Industrial Life, in Coatbridge, runs a former Glasgow Corporation tram on its electric tramway.

== See also ==
- Glasgow Subway
- Glasgow and Ibrox Tramway
- National Tramway Museum
- Scottish Tramway and Transport Society
- Strathclyde Partnership for Transport
- Summerlee Heritage Park
- Transport in Glasgow
- Glasgow Museum of Transport
- Clyde Metro
- Tramway
