= John Coulter =

John Coulter, Coalter, or Colter may refer to:

- John Coalter (1771–1838), Virginia lawyer
- John Colter (c. 1774–1812 or 1813), member of the Lewis and Clark Expedition
- John Coulter (Lord Provost) (c. 1680–1747), Lord Provost of Glasgow from 1736 to 1738
- John Coulter (playwright) (1888–1980), Irish-born Canadian playwright
- John Coulter (politician) (born 1930), Australian politician
- John Merle Coulter (1851–1928), American botanist
- John B. Coulter (1891–1983), American general
- Jackie Coulter (1912–1981), Northern Irish footballer
- Jackie Coulter (loyalist) (1954–2000), Northern Irish loyalist
