= Provan Gas Works =

Gas storage and distribution facility in Glasgow, Scotland

Coordinates: 55°52′21″N 4°12′13″W

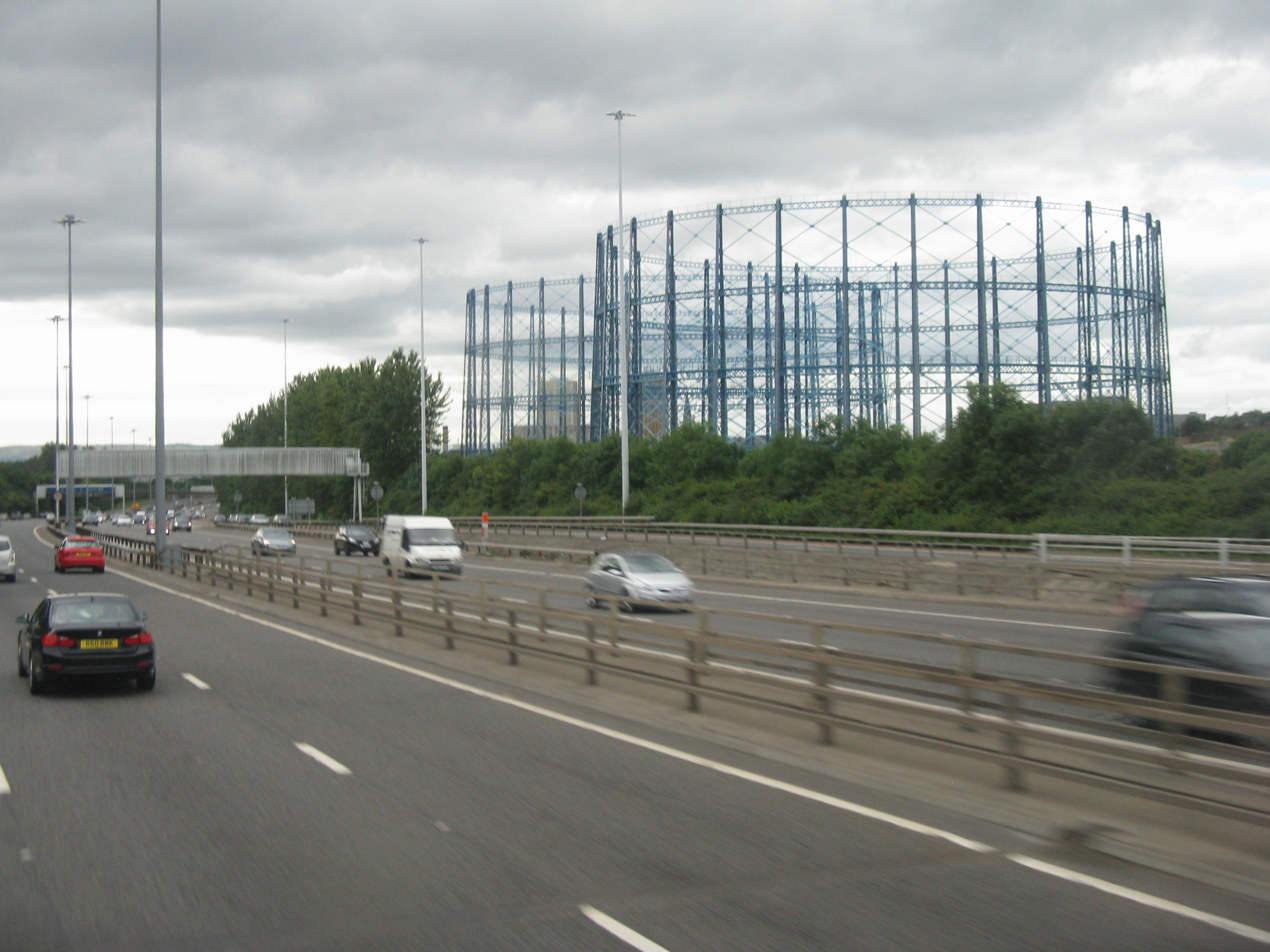
- The twin gasometer frames of Provan Gas Works, next to the M8 motorway
- Interactive map of Provan Gas Works
- Location: Provanmill, Glasgow, Scotland
- Built: 1903
- Built for: Glasgow Corporation
- Original use: Manufacture of town gas from coal Natural gas / LPG storage
- Current use: Future site of HMP Glasgow
- Governing body: Glasgow City Council

Listed Building – Category B
- Official name: Provan Gasworks, Blochairn Road; No. 1 Gasholder and No. 2 Gasholder, excluding tanks and shells.
- Designated: 5 December 2017
- Reference no.: LB45641

Provan Gas Works is a decommissioned industrial gas holding plant in the city of Glasgow, Scotland. The plant lies between the Blackhill, Blochairn, Germiston and Provanmill areas of the city, The plant is best known for its two massive column-guided gasometers, which have become an iconic industrial landmark in Glasgow's East End. Most of the plant has now been demolished and will be the site of the future HMP Glasgow, which is under construction as of 2026, with the only surviving element being the two gasometer frames which are now preserved as Grade B-listed structures.

The plant was originally built by Glasgow Corporation between 1900 and 1904. It later became part of British Gas, and subsequently Transco, and its final owner Scotia Gas Networks (previously a subsidiary of Scottish and Southern Energy). Originally the plant was a gasworks, manufacturing town gas via the cooking of coal. The plant was expanded after 1919. Following nationalisation of the gas supply in 1948, the plant passed to the Scottish Gas Board, and then to British Gas in 1973. In 1972, supplies of inexpensive natural gas from North Sea oilfields became available. The gasworks was downsized significantly in the 1980s in response to changing economic conditions arising as the British gas industry was privatised under Prime Minister Margaret Thatcher.

The two gasholders were the largest of their kind in the UK, each of the towers can hold 283,000 m^{3} (9,994,000 cu ft) of gas, and is 85.4 metres (280 ft) in diameter. Their combined storage capacity is 566,000 m^{3} (19,988,000 cu ft) – each enough to supply a city the size of York for an entire day.

Since the construction of the M8 and M80 motorways in the 1970s and 1980s, which run directly next to the plant, the twin gasholders have become an unofficial portal into the city's central area for drivers from Edinburgh and the north. The towers have also gained an affectionate following among locals since they are often used to display huge placards showcasing the various promotional slogans for the city, the most memorable being the "Glasgow's Miles Better" and "Everyone's Glasgowing On" campaigns.

The future of the plant was discussed when Glasgow City Council proposed plans for decontaminating the unused land on the brownfield site and redeveloping it for commercial use. In 2012, Scotia Gas Networks announced that the twin column-guided and single spiral-guided gasometers were to be decommissioned, with no decision made on their future. The twin column-guided gasholders were protected as Category B listed structures in 2018 by Historic Environment Scotland (with associated buildings on the site listed at Category C), a decision which the owners disputed due to the high maintenance costs involved, particularly when no longer being used for their originally designed purpose. However, the listed status (along with a pair of similar structures located in the city's Temple / Kelvindale area) was upheld after appeal, supported by local MP Paul Sweeney, who called for the creative reuse of the structures, citing other examples from around the UK such as Granton Gasworks in Edinburgh, and internationally such as Gasometer Vienna, Gasometer Oberhausen, Østre Gasværk Teater and Newstead Gasworks.

In 2020, the Scottish Prison Service announced that it intended to buy 22 hectares (54 acres) of land adjacent to the gas works to build a replacement for HM Prison Barlinnie.

Demolition of the unlisted spiral-guided gasometer began in 2020.
