= Glasgow Tramway and Omnibus Company =

Tramway service in Glasgow, Scotland

Operation
- Locale: Glasgow
- Open: 19 August 1872
- Close: 1 July 1894
- Status: Closed

Infrastructure
- Track gauge: 4 ft 7 3/4 in (1,416 mm)
- Propulsion system: Horse

Statistics
- Route length: 30.21 miles (48.62 km)

The Glasgow Tramway and Omnibus Company operated a horse-drawn tramway service in Glasgow between 1872 and 1894. The tram system was then taken into municipal ownership, becoming Glasgow Corporation Tramways.

== History ==
The Glasgow Street Tramways Act 1870 (33 & 34 Vict. c. clxxv) was enacted by Parliament. This legislation allowed Glasgow Town Council to decide whether or not to have tramways within Glasgow. In 1872, the town council laid a 2½-mile route from St George's Cross to Eglinton Toll (via New City Road, Cambridge Street, Sauchiehall Street, Renfield Street and the Jamaica Bridge).

The Glasgow Street Tramways Act 1870 prohibited the town council from directly operating a tram service over the lines. The act further stipulated that a private company be given the operating lease of the tram-lines for a period of 22 years. The St George's Cross to Eglinton Toll tram line was opened on 19 August 1872 with a horse-drawn service by the Glasgow Tramway and Omnibus Company.

The company expanded in 1893 by leasing the Glasgow and Ibrox Tramway and the Vale of Clyde Tramway.

== Municipal takeover ==
The tramway business was acquired by Glasgow Corporation in 1894 (except for the routes of the Glasgow and Ibrox Tramway and the Vale of Clyde Tramway). With modernisation, including electrification, Glasgow Corporation Tramways continued operating until 1962.
