= Molendinar Burn =

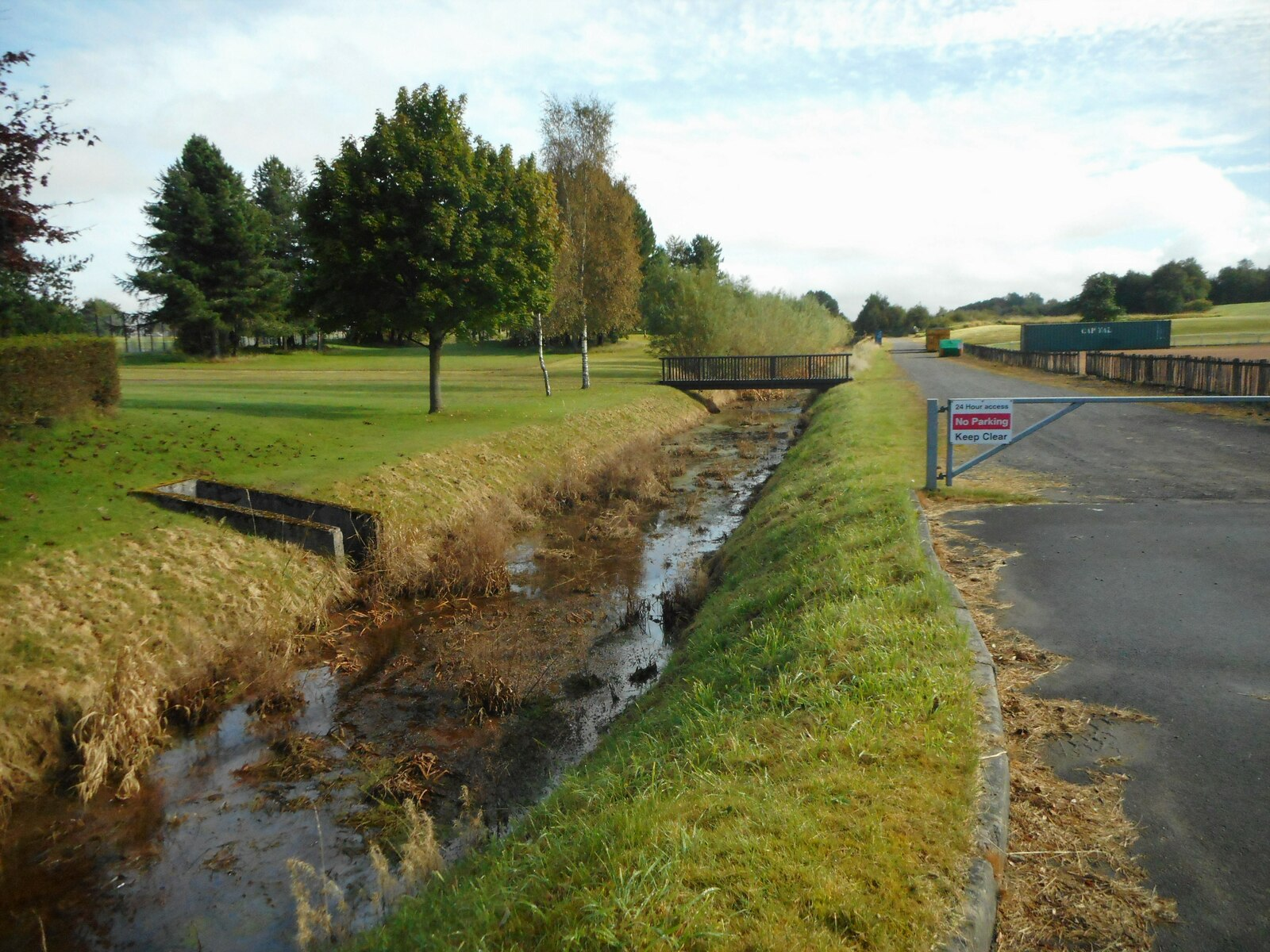
- The Molendinar Burn at Stepps

Physical characteristics
- Source: Frankfield Loch
  - location: Cardowan, Glasgow
  - coordinates: 55°53′04.8″N 4°09′05.5″W
  - elevation: 82 m (269 ft)
- Mouth: River Clyde
  - location: Glasgow Green
  - coordinates: 55°51′08.9″N 4°14′44.8″W
  - elevation: 0 m (0 ft)
- Length: 7 km (4.3 mi)

The Molendinar Burn is a small tributary of the Clyde in Glasgow, Scotland, now largely culverted. It is popularly associated with Saint Mungo, who is said to have founded his church on its banks. The name may stem from Mellingdenor, a place mentioned in Jocelin of Furness's biography of Mungo. The further etymology of the name is obscure; the first element may be Cumbric melin, meaning "mill".

== Historic course (late 1700s) ==
Richard Thomas' 1795 "map of the town of Glasgow & country seven miles round" clearly shows the course of the burn. The source at that time was a small loch at "Huggenfield" to the north east of the city (the present day Hogganfield Loch). The course then headed generally south west, passing through the virtually undeveloped areas of Craighead, Blackhill and Blochairn, where it passed under the Monkland Canal. Approaching the city, the course turned south past Glasgow Cathedral and down the route of the present day Wishart Street, passing under what are now Duke Street and Gallowgate to pass in front of St Andrew's Church. Saltmarket south of Bridgegate did not exist at that time, the burn ran through fields there to enter the Clyde at the present day Clyde Street at Mart Street. Peter Fleming's 1807 "Map of the City of Glasgow and suburbs" shows the city centre area of the burn in greater detail. It can be seen from both of these maps that the burn ran almost entirely above ground at that time.

== Present course (2020) ==
The present source of the burn is Frankfield Loch in Cardowan. This loch did not exist (or was not mapped) when Thomas published his 1795 map. A short manmade cut connects Frankfield Loch to the 900-metre-distant (9/16-mile) Hogganfield Loch. The route from Hogganfield Loch to the Clyde is fairly similar to that of 1795. However the majority of the length of the burn has been culverted in stages since the 1870s. Short stretches of the burn can be seen above ground in Molendinar Park (in the Blackhill / Provanmill area) and beside the former Great Eastern Hotel on Duke Street.

The final 250-metre (275 yd) stretch from Greendyke to the Clyde was rerouted at some time in the past. The burn now enters the Clyde 125 m (140 yd) upstream of the 1795 confluence point, near the Tidal Weir.

== Gallery ==
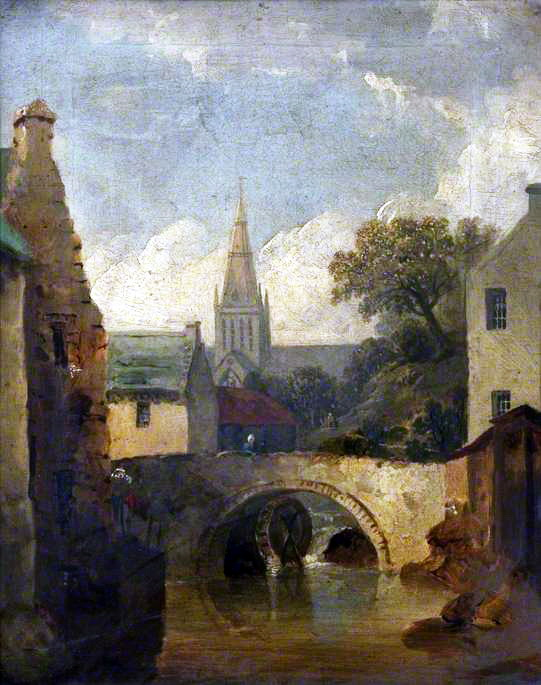
The Molendinar Burn by Elizabeth Walker, c. 1850

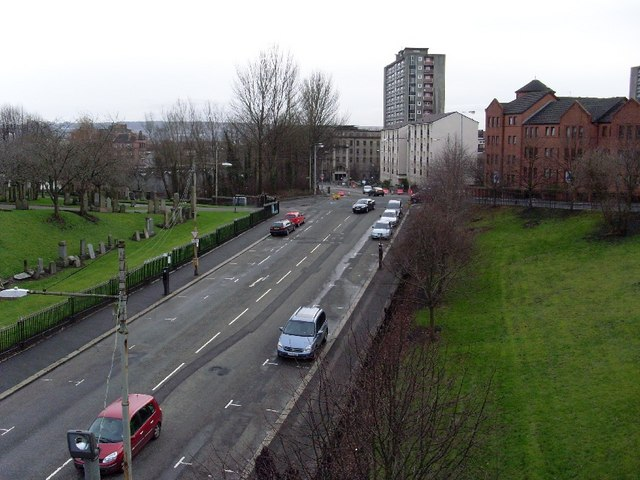
Wishart Street, built on top of the culvert carrying the Molendinar Burn

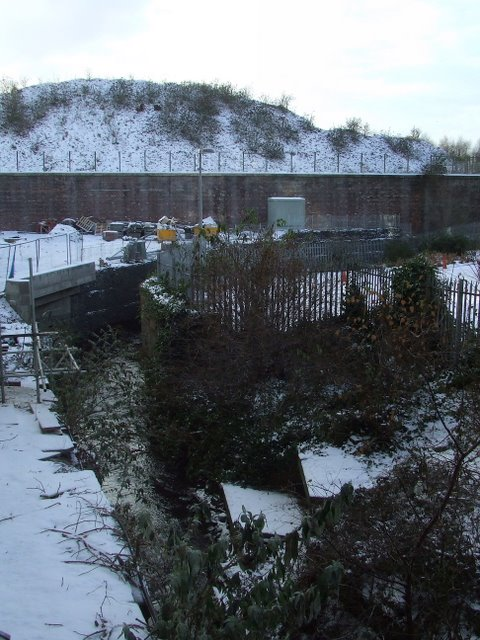
The Molendinar Burn at Duke Street

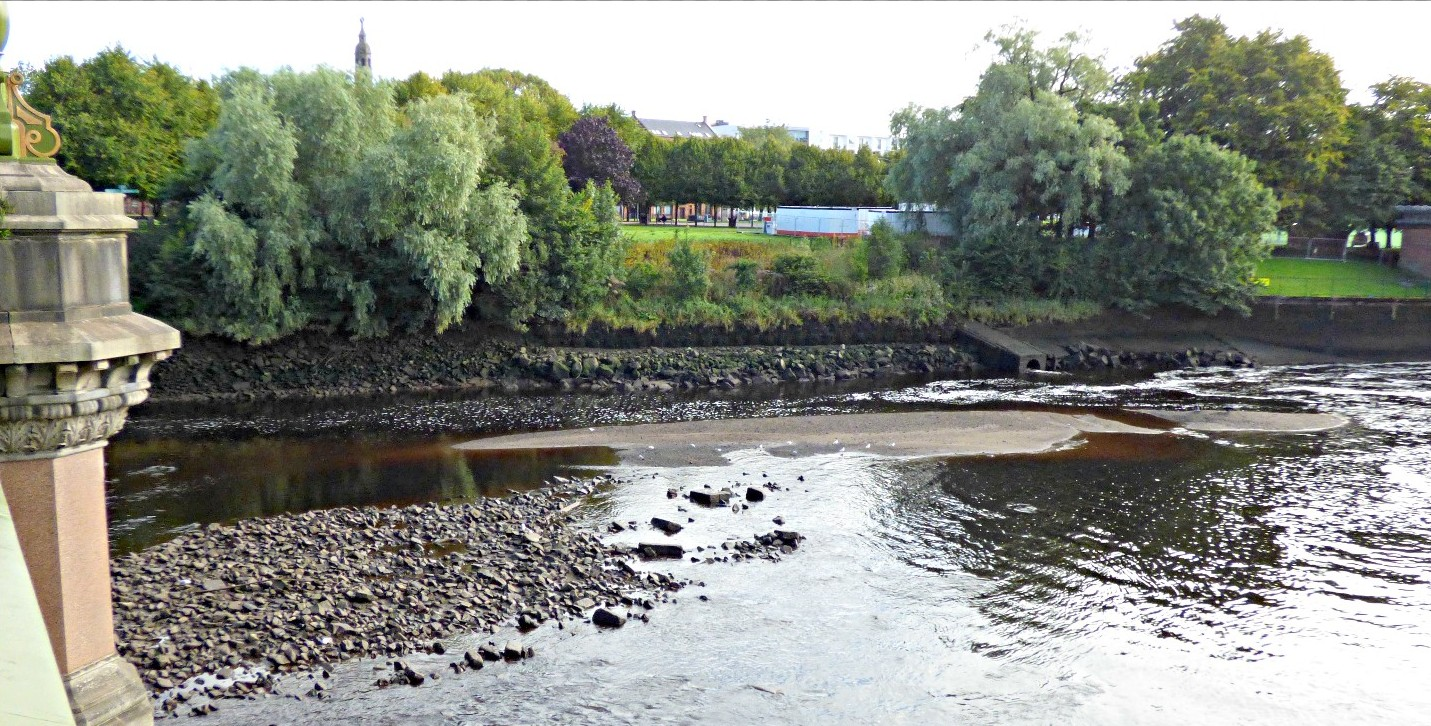
The culverted Molendinar Burn entering the Clyde at Glasgow Green (2020)
