= Molendinar =

Molendinar can refer to:

- Molendinar, Queensland in Australia
- Molendinar Burn in Glasgow
