= St Roch =

St Roch may refer to:

- Saint Roch (traditionally c.1295 – 16 August 1327)
- St. Roch (ship), a Royal Canadian Mounted Police exploration vessel
- St. Roch, New Orleans, a section of the city of New Orleans, Louisiana
- St. Roch's Secondary School, a Roman Catholic secondary school in Glasgow
- St Roch's F.C., a Scottish football club in Glasgow
