= Hogganfield =

Coordinates: 55.881394°N 4.176042°W

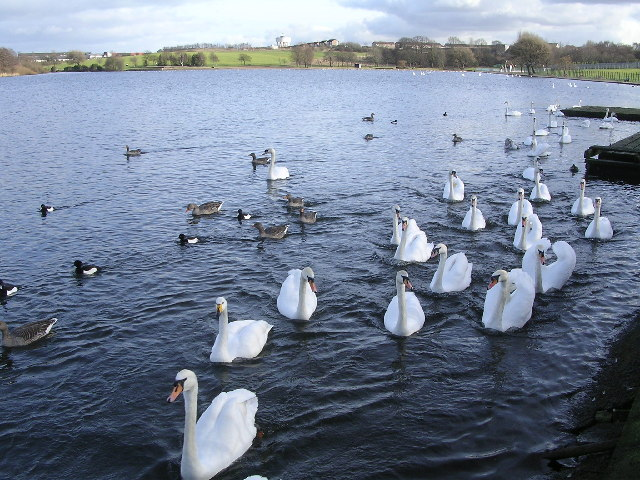
- Hogganfield Loch

- Location within Glasgow
- OS grid reference: NS638674
- Civil parish: Glasgow
- Council area: Glasgow City Council
- Lieutenancy area: Glasgow
- Country: Scotland
- Sovereign state: United Kingdom
- Post town: GLASGOW
- Postcode district: G33
- Dialling code: 0141
- Police: Scotland
- Fire: Scottish
- Ambulance: Scottish
- UK Parliament: Glasgow North East
- Scottish Parliament: Glasgow Provan

Hogganfield (/ˈhʌɡənˌfild/ HUG-ən-feeld) is a district in the Scottish city of Glasgow, located to the north east of the city centre. Hogganfield is surrounded by the Glasgow districts of Blackhill, Craigend, Millerston, Provanmill, Riddrie, Robroyston, Ruchazie and Stepps. The M80, Stepps bypass, separates Hogganfield from Robroyston.

== History ==
The Molendinar Burn, a key influence in the siting of the city of Glasgow by St Kentigern, flows from Frankfield Loch through Hogganfield Loch.

Hogganfield is four to five miles (six to eight kilometres) from Glasgow city centre and is situated off Junction 12 of the M8 eastbound motorway.

Hogganfield Loch is mentioned in the Thomas Richardson map of 1795 mainly as bogland around the neighbouring Frankfield Loch. The area was mainly marsh and farmland until the 1950s, when large scale housing began in the area.

== Areas ==
=== Lochview ===
Some of the older generation still refer to Lochview, which is an estate in Hogganfield, as the "rhubarb fields". It was owned by the Pinkertons (mathematics teachers) and they brought about the estate of Lochview by allowing it to be used for housing construction use. A private housing development was constructed from the early-to-mid-1980s. It consists of 4 roads all named Lochview: Drive, Place, Gardens and Crescent. The main road is Lochview Drive.

Lochview's common ground maintenance is privately factored. Lochview Residents Association is made up of a group of volunteers, approved by residents at an annual meeting.

=== Meadowview and Willowpark ===
These estates sit behind Lochview. Streets are named Colintraive Avenue/Crescent and Mossbank Avenue/Drive. The houses on Lochiew, Meadowview and Willowpark are formed exclusively with common/engineering brick, both blonde and red and consist of flats, villas, semi-villas and bungalows.

=== Hogganfield Manor ===
This estate is built around Avenue End Road side of the loch.

=== Lochside View ===
A local company, A.B. Hamilton, moved from their original site, to former Esso Petrol Station site, where it remains, under the name of Kenmore/Highmore. These headquarters sit across from the loch on Cumbernauld Road. Kenmore/Highmore used the old A.B. Hamilton's site to construct Lochside View - a complex of luxury apartments and townhouses and named the street Lochview Gate. It is a consort of Lochview Estate.

=== Hogganfield Loch ===
The area in and around Hogganfied, including Riddrie, is historically called the "Sheeps Craig". Hogganfield gets its name from first year castrated rams (Hoggs/hoggets) that grazed there prior to being moved on to the slaughterhouse (c.17th/18th cent). The names of Craigend, Westercraigs and Eastercraigs can still be found in the area today within the local Housing areas.

Hogganfield Loch is part of a series of kettle ponds in the area, caused by glacial slip dating from the last ice age. Other kettle ponds in the area include, Bishop's, Frankfield, Woodend and Lochend Lochs – the latter are part of Drumpellier country park.

In 1923 a pre-refrigeration business was started at Hogganfield selling ice to the cafes, restaurants & eateries around Glasgow, until it became fashionable to use Scandinavian ice from Norway, thus ending Hogganfield Loch as a commercial enterprise.

Hogganfield Loch is now part of a public park and bird sanctuary – the rare jack snipe as it travels from Siberia has been seen in the park.

Hogganfield Loch attracts a few non-competitive fishermen. The park, together with an 18-hole golf course, is maintained by Glasgow City Council.

An unknown natural gas seepage has affected the loch in the past, possibly caused by rotting vegetation or seepage from old coal mines.
