= Glasgow and Ibrox Tramway =

Tramway operator in Scotland

Operation
- Locale: Glasgow
- Open: 18 July 1879
- Close: 25 May 1891
- Status: Closed

Infrastructure
- Track gauge: 4 ft 7 3/4 in (1,416 mm)
- Propulsion system: Horse

Statistics
- Route length: 1.55 miles (2.49 km)

Glasgow and Ibrox Tramway Act 1877
- Act of Parliament
- Parliament of the United Kingdom
- Long title: An Act to authorise the construction of Tramways from Glasgow to Ibrox; and for other purposes.
- Citation: 40 & 41 Vict. c. cxcii

Dates
- Royal assent: 2 August 1877

Text of statute as originally enacted

The Glasgow and Ibrox Tramway operated a horse tramway service in Glasgow, Scotland, between 1879 and 1891.

== History ==
The Glasgow and Ibrox Tramway Company built this line from Ibrox to the Paisley Toll Road on the Govan boundary with Glasgow where it connected with the Vale of Clyde Tramways.

== Closure ==
Unable to make a profit, the company went bankrupt on 25 May 1891 and sold the line to the Glasgow Commissioners of Police on 10 July 1893. From 1891 the services were operated by Glasgow Tramway and Omnibus Company. It was taken over by Glasgow Corporation Tramways on 10 November 1896.
