= Garngad railway station =

Disused railway station in Scotland

Coordinates: 55°52′20″N 4°13′03″W

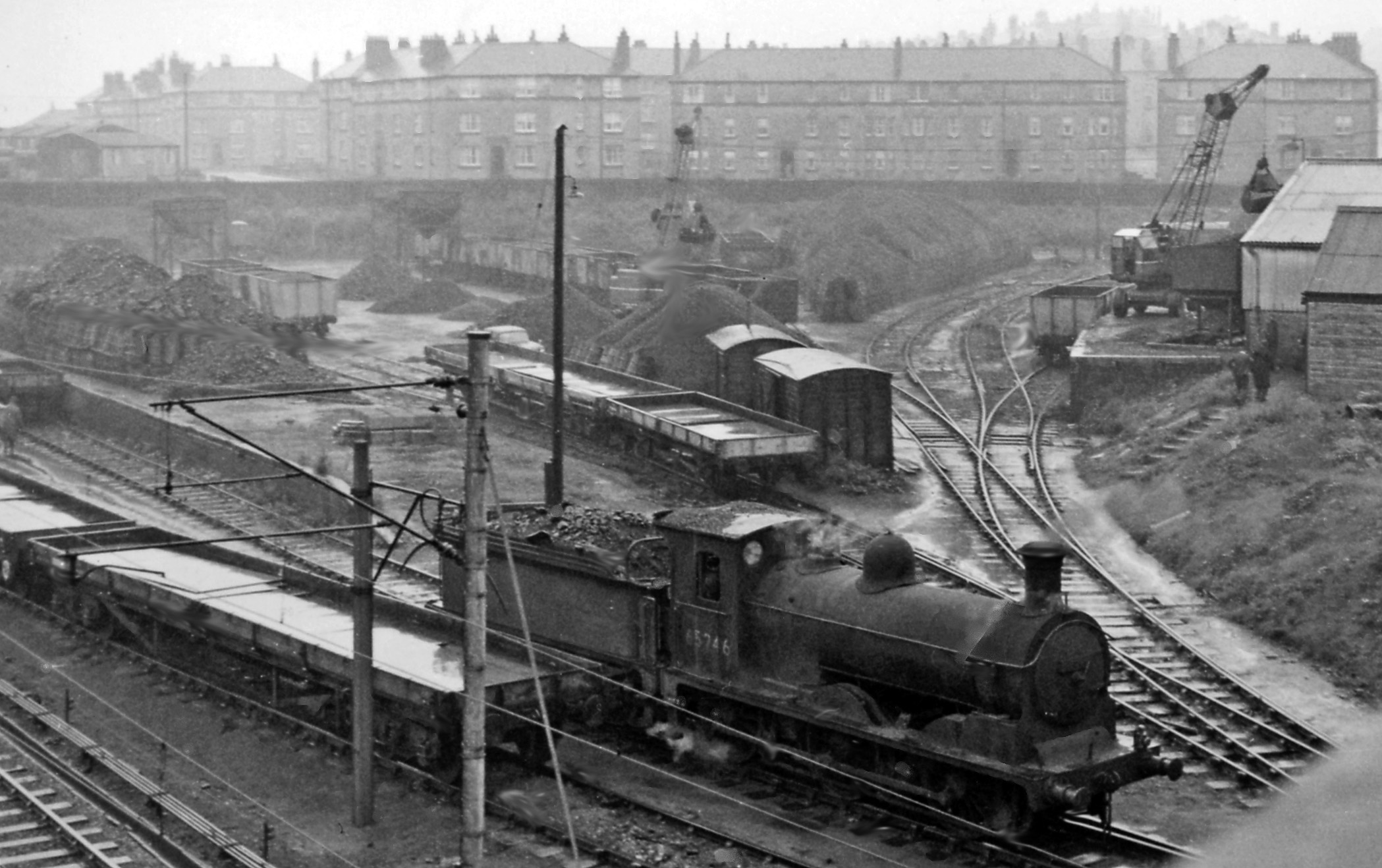
Garngad Sidings in 1961

Garngad railway station was a railway station in Royston, Glasgow on the City Union Line, on the Garngad chord. It closed for passenger traffic in 1910.

The station opened on 1 October 1883. It was known as Blochairn station until 1885, when it was renamed to Garngad. The station closed on 1 March 1910. It was operated by the North British Railway. Passenger trains still operate through the station site to and from Springburn, the line having been AC electrified since 1960.
