= Francis Fauquier =

British colonial administrator (1703–1768)

Francis Fauquier FRS
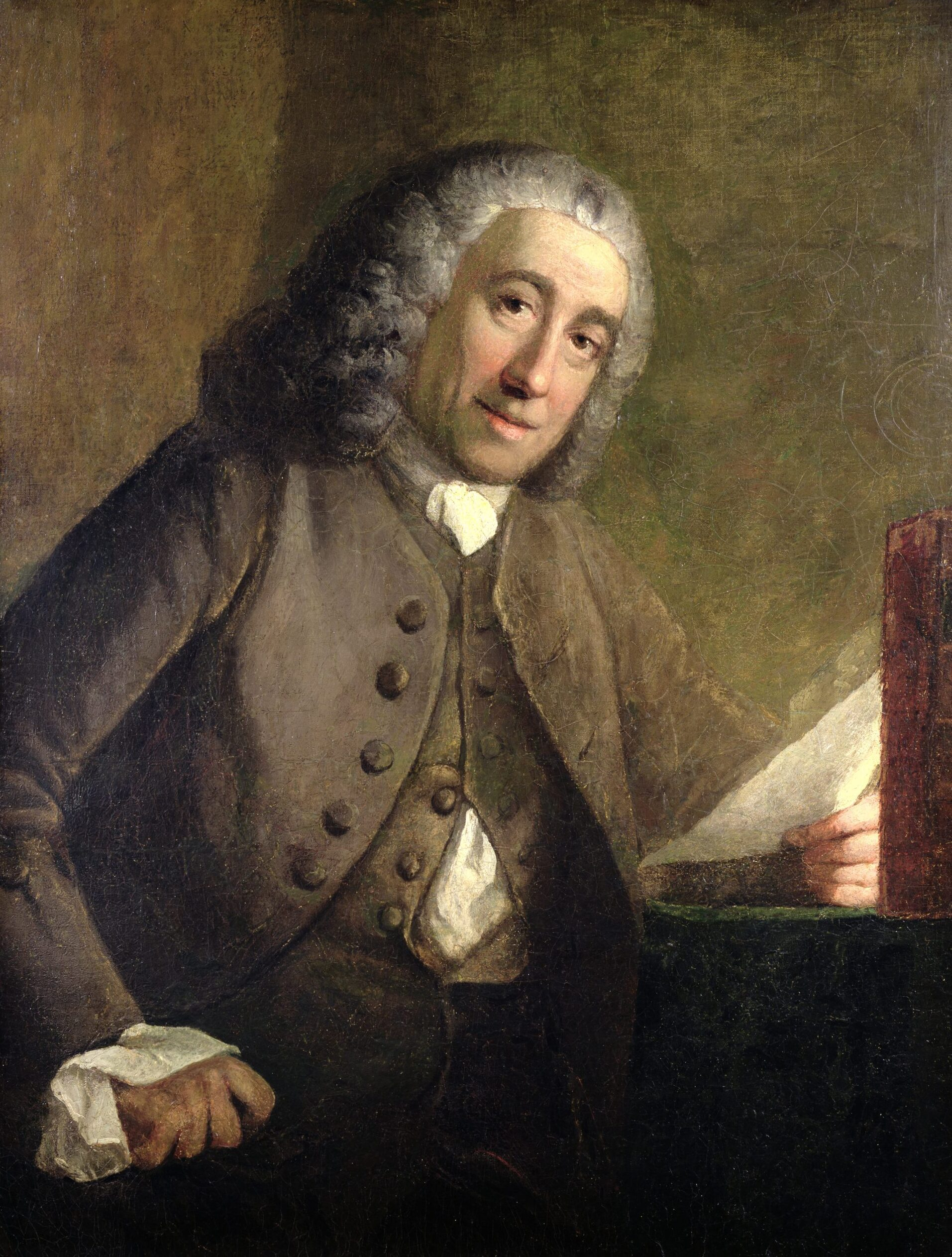
- Portrait by Benjamin Wilson, c. 1757

Lieutenant governor of Virginia
- In office 1758–1768
- Monarchs: George II; George III
- Preceded by: Robert Dinwiddie
- Succeeded by: Norborne Berkeley, 4th Baron Botetourt

Personal details
- Born: 1703 England
- Died: 3 March 1768 (aged 64–65) Williamsburg, Virginia
- Occupation: Colonial administrator

Francis Fauquier (1703 – 3 March 1768) was a British colonial administrator who served as the lieutenant governor of Virginia from 1758 to 1768. Born in England to a Huguenot family, he emigrated to the British colony of Virginia to take up of the office of lieutenant governor. A teacher and close friend of Thomas Jefferson, Fauquier frequently hosted lavish parties for the American gentry as governor. Fauquier County in present-day Virginia, a campus building at the College of William & Mary, and The Fauquier Society, a secret society at the College of William & Mary, are named for him.

== Background ==
Fauquier's coat of arms

Francis Fauquier was born in England in 1703. His father, John Francis Fauquier, was a French Huguenot from Clairac who relocated to England where he worked as a financial agent and deputy master of the mint under Sir Isaac Newton. Later in life John became director of the Bank of England and left his son a sizeable fortune. In c. 1729 John married Catherine Dalston and had two sons with her, including Fauqier.

Like his father, Fauquier was brought up to be a renaissance man with expertise in both science and industry, with interests in the arts and charity. He became director of the South Sea Company in 1751. In that same year he also became one of the governors of the charitable Foundling Hospital for abandoned children. He was elected a Fellow of the Royal Society in 1753. He came to the colony of Virginia as lieutenant governor in 1758, succeeding Robert Dinwiddie, and remained in that position until his death. He published several financial essays, among them the idea Raising Money for Support of the War, which was published in 1756, and served as an audition for the replacement of his Virginian predecessor.

In the absence of the governors—the 4th Earl of Loudoun (1756–63) and Jeffery, Lord Amherst (1763–68)—he was the chief administrative officer. Instructions sent with him demanded that the office of treasurer of the colony be taken from the Speaker of the House of Burgesses, but he disobeyed these instructions and gained and maintained the friendship of the house. He commissioned in 1759 Andrew Burnaby to write a series of observations upon the state of the colonies. In 1760 he informed the government of the colonial trend toward opposition to British policies in the colony and proposed that British tax policy be changed. On 1 June 1765, however, he dissolved the House of Burgesses when it passed a resolution against the Stamp Act. Patrick Henry was a thorn in Fauquier's side for some time; he always called Henry "young and hotheaded".

Except in combating disloyalty, he sympathized with the colonists, and was one of the ablest and most popular of the royal governors. Fauquier died in the Governor's Palace at Williamsburg, Virginia on 3 March 1768 at the age of 65. A residence hall at the College of William & Mary is named after Fauquier. In his will and testament, he lamented that his lifestyle in Virginia required him to own slaves, and he stipulated that his 12 adult slaves be allowed to choose their new enslavers and that female slaves not be separated from their children.

== Works ==
- An Essay on Ways and Means for Raising Money for the Support of the Present War, without Increasing the Public Debts (1756): Fauquier wrote this essay, which generated significant public debate, in the context of the Seven Years' War with France. In it, he argued that the war would be too expensive for the government to finance by increasing taxes on manufacturers or workers, and suggested that taxes be levied on houses instead. In a second edition he added arguments in favour of a capitation tax based on estates and consumption.

== See also ==
- Age of Enlightenment
- George Wythe and William Small, close friends and contemporaries of Fauquier
