= Lawrence Dinwiddie =

Lawrence Dinwiddie of Germiston (1696–1764) was an 18th-century Scottish tobacco lord who served as Lord Provost of Glasgow from 1742 to 1744.

Dinwiddie Street in the Germiston area of north Glasgow is named in his honour.

== Life ==
He was born at Germiston House in Glasgow on New Year's Eve 31 December 1696, the son of Robert Dinwiddie and his wife Elizabeth Cumming. His older brother Robert Dinwiddie was Lieutenant Governor of Virginia. His father had built Germiston House in 1690 with monies from his tobacco investments (one of the first Scots in this field).

Lawrence was a Virginia tobacco lord, inheriting the business from his father, one of the first Scottish tobacco lords. Lawrence created the firm Dinwiddie Crawford & Company.

In 1734 he served as a Bailie under Lord Provost Andrew Ramsay in Glasgow Town Council.

He succeeded Andrew Buchanan of Drumpellier as Lord Provost in 1742 and in turn was replaced by Andrew Cochrane in 1744.

In 1761, with 25 others, including Andrew Cochrane he founded the Glasgow Arms Bank. He was also a founder of the Delftfield Pottery Company in Glasgow.

He died in Glasgow on 3 May 1764, leaving the poor of the Merchants' House 200 Scots Merks in his will.

== Family ==
He married twice, firstly to Janet Coulter, sister of Provost John Coulter. Following her death he married Elizabeth Kennedy of Auchtyfardle. Between his two wives he had 21 children.
