= John Coulter (Lord Provost) =

John Coulter (c.1680–1747) was an 18th-century Scottish sugar and tobacco merchant who served as Lord Provost of Glasgow from 1736 to 1738.

== Life ==
He was the son of James Coulter (d.1708) a prominent Glasgow merchant originally from Dumfriesshire.

John Coulter and estates in the West Indies cultivating sugar. The family also had tobacco plantations in Virginia.

When Coulter succeeded Andrew Ramsay as Lord Provost in 1736 the population of the city was just under 15,000 people.

He owned the estate of Auchinraith near Blantyre, originally called Whistleberry. The house was in the 18th century called The Grove and only later was called Auchinraith House. Aichinraith House was demolished and rebuilt in 1809.

He died on 17 November 1747 in Glasgow.

== Family ==
His sister, Janet Coulter, married Lawrence Dinwiddie.

His daughter, Margaret Coulter, died unmarried in 1794. The family estates then passed to Robert Dinwiddie, her cousin. Robert sold it to a distant cousin William Lockhart MP for Lanarkshire.

His brother Lawrence (Lawrie) Coulter was portrayed by John Kay in 1793.
