= Blackhill, Glasgow =

Coordinates: 55.8729°N 4.1959°W

Blackhill: Scottish Gaelic: Cnoc Dubh; Scots: Blackhull or Mirkhull
- Location within the Glasgow City council area Location within Scotland
- OS grid reference: NS627666
- Council area: Glasgow City
- Lieutenancy area: Glasgow
- Country: Scotland
- Sovereign state: United Kingdom
- Post town: GLASGOW
- Postcode district: G33 1
- Dialling code: 0141
- Police: Scotland
- Fire: Scottish
- Ambulance: Scottish
- UK Parliament: Glasgow North East
- Scottish Parliament: Glasgow Provan

Blackhill (Scottish Gaelic: Cnoc Dubh) is an area of north east Glasgow, Scotland. It is directly bordered by the M80 motorway to the west and the M8 motorway to the south. The neighbourhood falls within the North East ward under Glasgow City Council.

== History ==
Blackhill was developed as a council housing estate in the 1930s. Most of the new development was designated Rehousing, the lowest grade of council housing intended for those cleared from Glasgow's 19th century slums, particularly those in the Garngad (now Royston) area. The new buildings were three-storey, slate-roofed tenements built of reconstituted stone. The eastern side of Blackhill, nearer to Provanmill and Riddrie, was designated Intermediate, a grade up from Rehousing, and housing was of the cottage flat-type with front and rear gardens and a measure of landscaping in the streets ("Rehousing" areas cost £250 per house to build, while "Intermediate" areas cost £1000). A large swathe of the area was destroyed in 1990 to make way for the construction of the M80 motorway.

The area has historically been one of deprivation and violence, and became notorious for ruthless crime gangs and drug dealing - however the local St. Paul's church started a youth forum which aimed to combat these issues and create better lives and opportunities for the young people of Blackhill. Since starting up St. Paul's has been responsible for a 96% decrease in violence within the area since 2006.

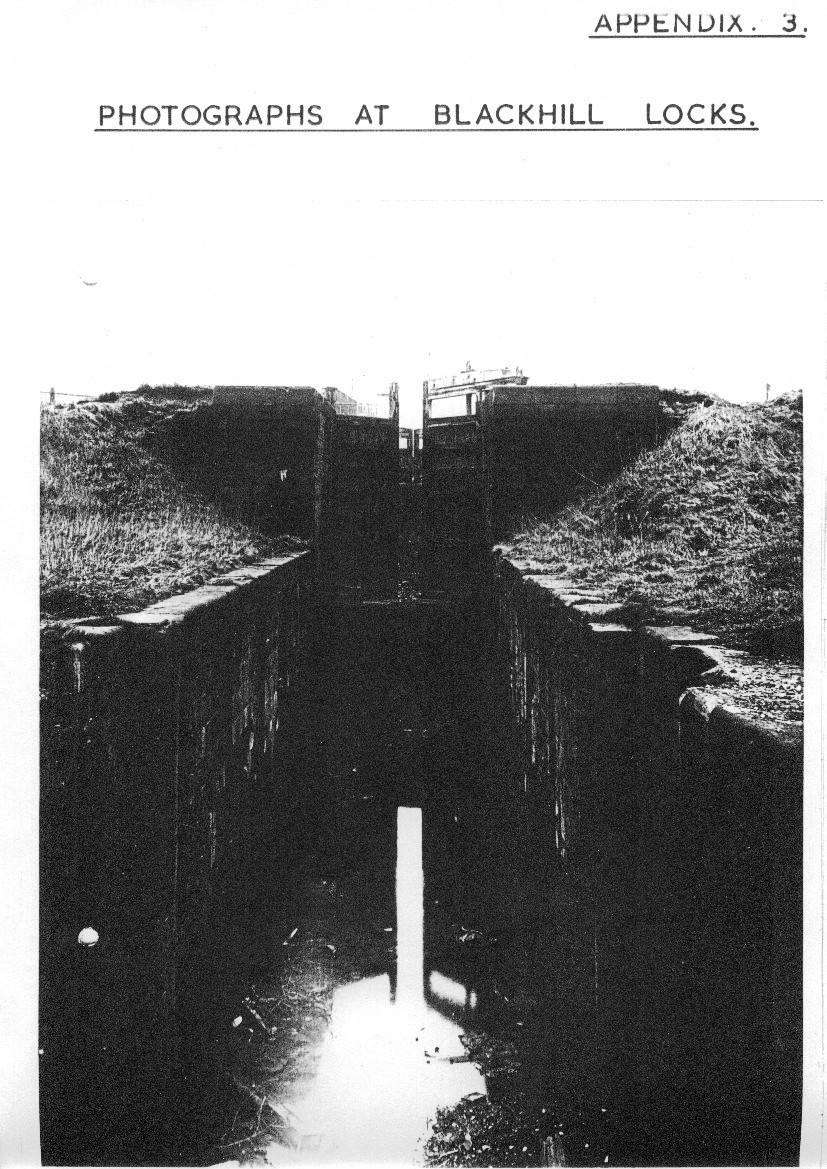
Blackhill Locks on the Monkland Canal

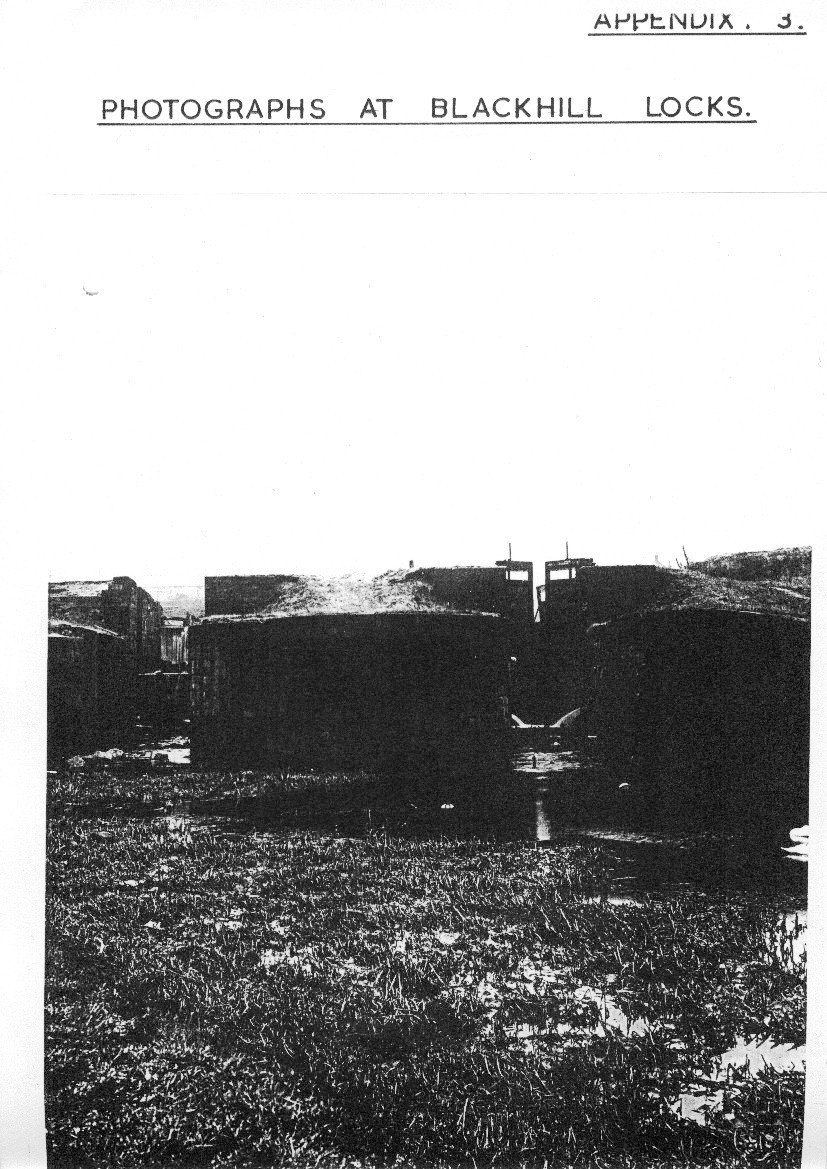
Blackhill Locks lower basin

Blackhill was built on a country golf course (see Glasgow Golf Club), near the Monkland Canal with its Blackhill Locks. Many early residents report summers of country rambles, often along the Molendinar Burn – now the only place this historic burn is still visible on the surface – to the loch at Hogganfield. There was (and is) a strong sense of neighbourliness, partly encouraged by the enclosed nature of the site, due to industry, railways and main roads cutting it off from other districts. It was, however, built close to a gasworks (Provan Gas Works) and a distillery, which did not add to the health of the area and, perhaps for this reason, it gained a reputation for being "difficult to let".

Much of the 1930s housing was demolished in the early 1990s with the rest of the area redeveloped in the early 21st century, with all of its remaining tenement stock demolished and replaced with Newfields, a housing development built by Mansell Homes featuring new build detached and semi-detached houses. A landscaped park was created around the Molendinar Burn. A 2007 community survey reported residents' concerns were similar to those in other urban areas:

"In the last issue we reported the findings of a local survey that helped to pinpoint the top 10 priority issues for your neighbourhood – things like road safety, litter and vandalism, dog fouling, dumping and youth disorder all featured strongly."

== Notable residents ==
- Paul Ferris, writer and former gangster
- Ian "Blink" MacDonald, former gangster
- Arthur Thompson, Gangster

== See also ==
- Housing in Glasgow
