= Robert Dinwiddie =

British colonial administrator (1692–1770)

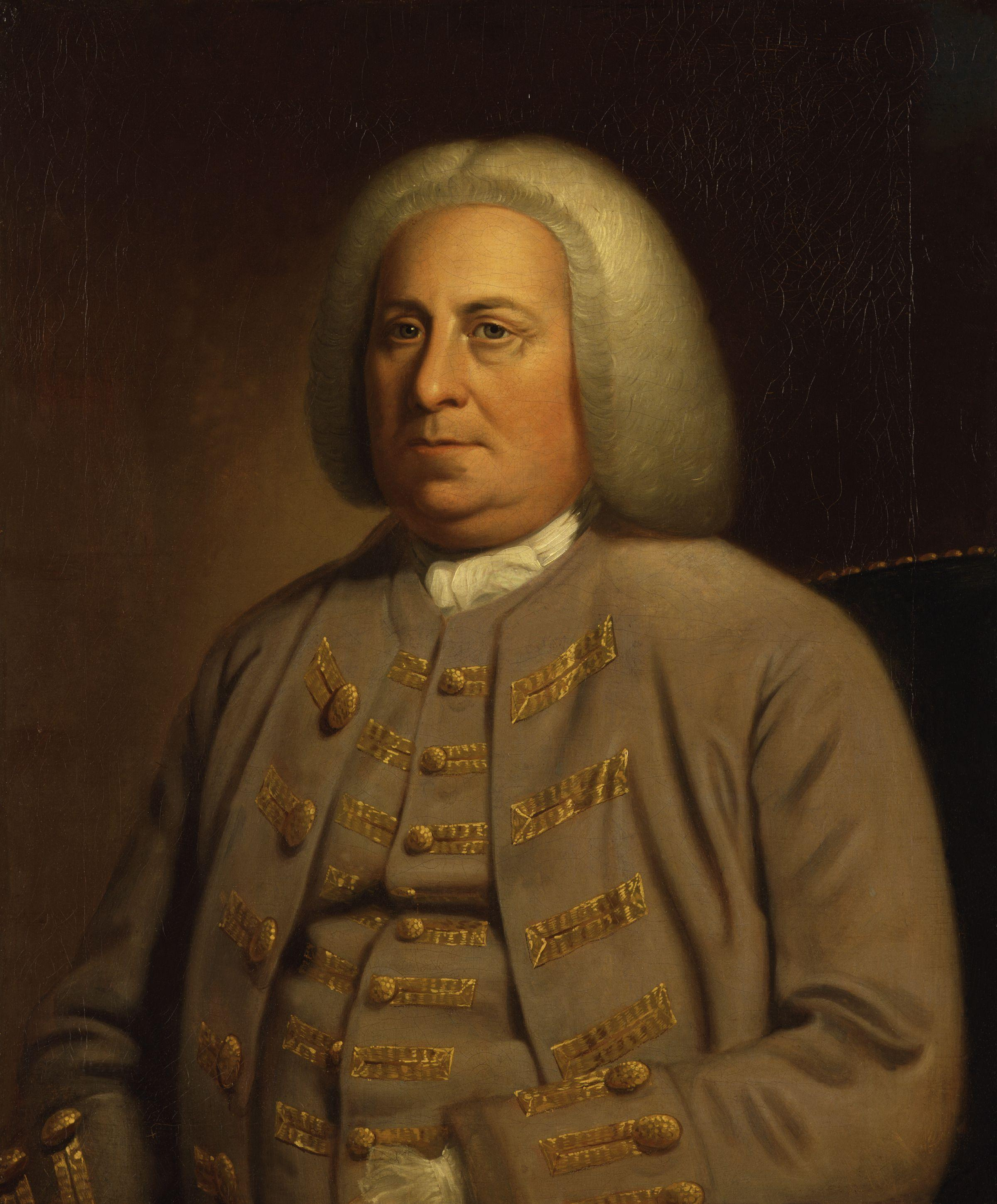
- c. 1752–1765 portrait

Lieutenant governor of Virginia
- In office 1751–1758
- Monarch: George II
- Preceded by: Lewis Burwell
- Succeeded by: Francis Fauquier

Personal details
- Born: October 3, 1692 Glasgow, Scotland
- Died: July 27, 1770 (aged 77) Bristol, England
- Relatives: Lawrence Dinwiddie (brother)
- Occupation: Colonial administrator

Robert Dinwiddie (October 3, 1692 – July 27, 1770) was a British colonial administrator who served as the lieutenant governor of Virginia from 1751 to 1758. Since the governors of Virginia remained in Great Britain, he served as the de facto head of the colony of Virginia. Dinwiddie is credited for starting the military career of George Washington.

== Early life and education ==
Dinwiddie was born in Glasgow on October 3, 1692. His younger brother Lawrence Dinwiddie was later Lord Provost of Glasgow. He was a descendant of the Lordly Dinwiddies of Annandale.

He matriculated at the university in 1707 before starting work as a merchant. Joining the British colonial service in 1727, Dinwiddie was appointed collector of the customs for Bermuda. In 1738, he outlined to the authorities in London the expenditures of the various British garrisons in America totaling £. 61,195 18s. 4d. Following an appointment as surveyor general of customs in southern American ports, Dinwiddie became Lieutenant Governor of Virginia, and featured as such in William Makepeace Thackeray's 19th century historical novel The Virginians: A Tale of the Last Century.

== French and Indian War ==
Dinwiddie's actions as lieutenant governor are cited by one historian as precipitating the French and Indian War, commonly held to have begun in 1754. He wanted to limit French expansion in Ohio Country, an area claimed by the Virginia Colony and in which the Ohio Company, of which he was a stockholder, had made preliminary surveys and some small settlements. This version of history is disputed when one notices that Father Le Loutre's War in Acadia began in 1749 and did not end until the expulsion of the Acadians in 1755. In fact, Thomas Jefferys, the Royal Geographer of the day, produced a pamphlet out of his Parliamentary testimony that explained the misconduct of the French in what amounted to a Treaty of Utrecht boundary dispute.

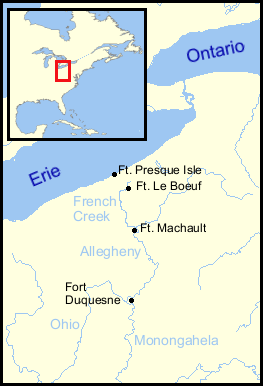
French forts near Lake Erie of 1753–54

In 1753, Dinwiddie learned the French had built Fort Presque Isle near Lake Erie and Fort Le Boeuf, which he saw as threatening Virginia's interests in the Ohio Valley. In fact, he considered Winchester, Virginia, to be "Exposed to the enemy"; Cumberland, Maryland, was only to be fortified the next year.

Dinwiddie sent an eight-man expedition under George Washington to warn the French to withdraw. Washington, then only 21 years old, made the journey in midwinter of 1753–54. Washington arrived at Fort Le Boeuf on 11 December 1753. Jacques Legardeur de Saint-Pierre, commandant at Fort Le Boeuf, a tough veteran of the west, received Washington politely, but rejected his ultimatum.

Jacques Saint-Pierre gave Washington three days hospitality at the fort, and then gave Washington a letter for him to deliver to Dinwiddie. The letter conveyed to Dinwiddie that he would send Dinwiddie's on to Marquis de Duquesne in Quebec and would meantime maintain his post while he awaited the latter's orders.

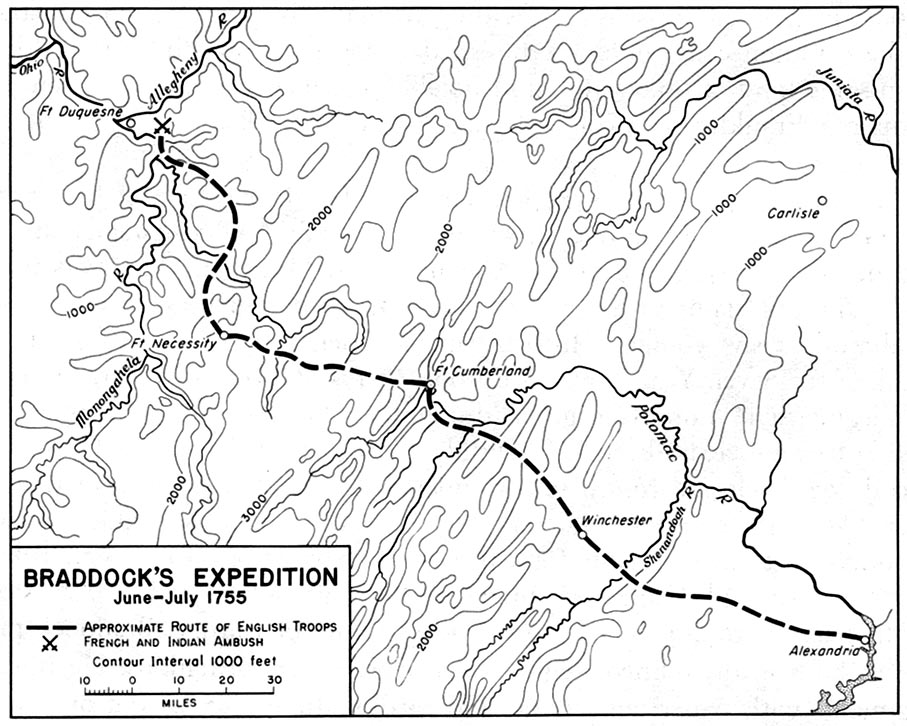
Topographic map of Virginia detailing, inter alia, the path of the Braddock Expedition

In January 1754, even before learning of the French refusal to decamp, Dinwiddie sent a small force of Virginia militia to build a fort at the forks of the Ohio River, where the Allegheny and Monongahela rivers merge to form the Ohio (present-day Pittsburgh). The French quickly drove off the Virginians and built a larger fort on the site, calling it Fort Duquesne, in honour of the Marquis de Duquesne, the then-governor of New France.

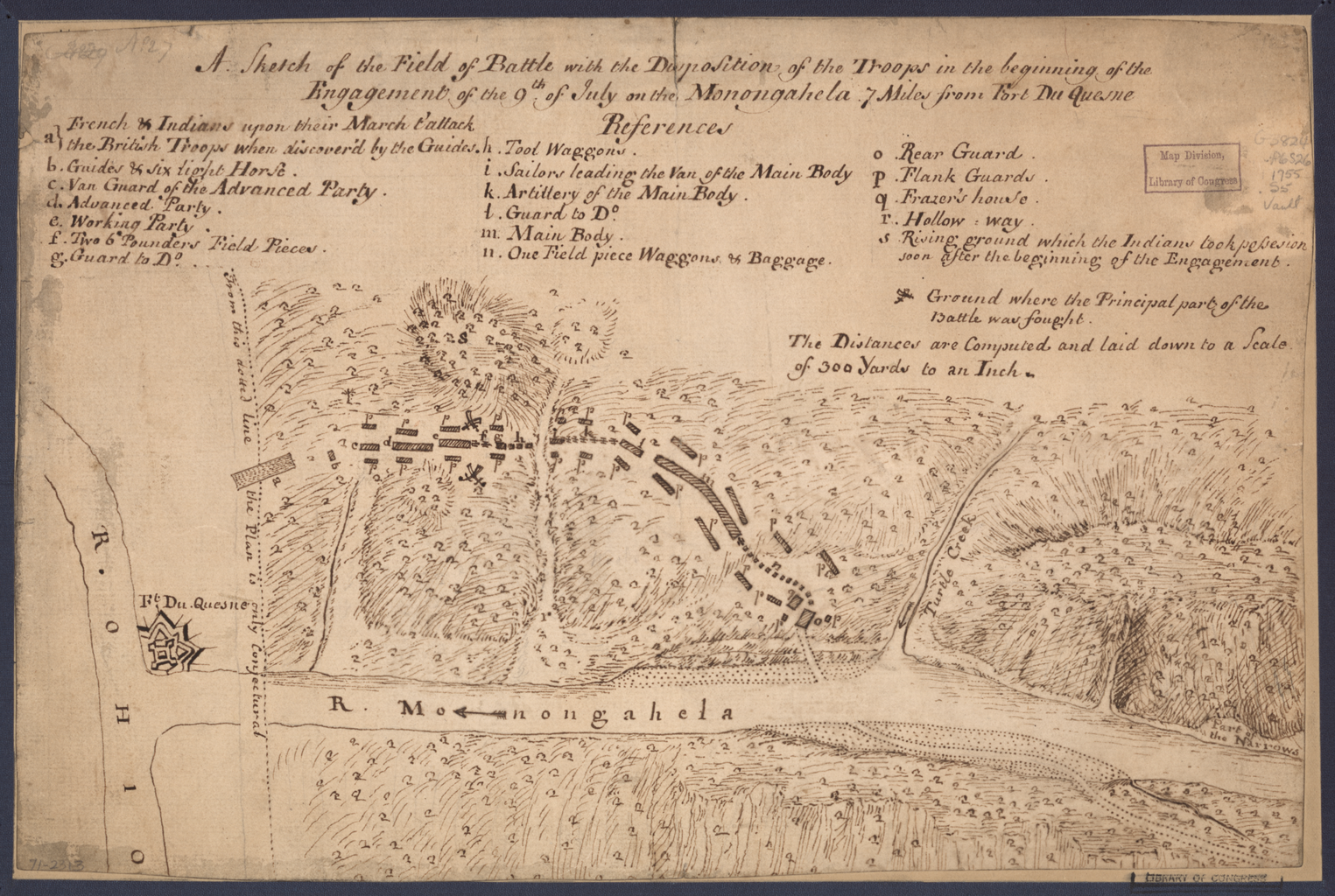
Troop positions before the 1755 Battle of Monongahela

Dinwiddie named Joshua Fry to the position of Commander-in-Chief of colonial forces. Fry was given command of the Virginia Regiment and was ordered to take Fort Duquesne, then held by the French. During the advance into the Ohio Country, Fry suddenly fell off his horse and died from his injuries on 31 May 1754 at Fort Cumberland, upon which the command of the regiment fell to Washington.

In early spring 1754, Dinwiddie sent Washington to build a road to the Monongahela. After having attacked the French at the Battle of Jumonville Glen, Washington retreated and built a small stockade, Fort Necessity, at a spot then called "Great Meadows", by the Youghiogheny River, eleven miles southeast of present-day Uniontown. Here he encountered the French in a skirmish on 3 July 1754 and was forced to surrender. Dinwiddie was subsequently active in rallying other colonies in defense against France and ultimately prevailed upon the British to send General Edward Braddock to Virginia with two regiments of regular troops, in part with a letter to Lord Halifax on 25 October 1754 containing these words:

The Invas'n and wicked designs of the Fr. on the River Ohio has given me a Continual Uneasiness, w'ch was increased by the supine and unaccountable Obstinacy of the Assemblies of the different Colonies on this Cont't, y't tho' they were convinced of the Progress they had made, and the threat'g Speeches they gave out, they c'd not be roused from their lethargic Indolence, to grant suitable Supplies for conducting an Expedit'n so necessary for their own Safety.

Braddock met his end at the Battle of Monongahela on 9 July 1755; this unexpected reverse prompted much concern and fear in the colony. Over the next four years, until the defeat of the French at the Battle of the Plains of Abraham in Quebec, and Vaudreuil's capitulation before Amherst at Montreal, the fate of the 13 colonies was uncertain and Dinwiddie's administration was marked by frequent disagreements with the Assembly over the financing of the war. In fact, the friction between the government and the Burgesses eventually developed into the American Revolution. In January 1758 he left Virginia, to be replaced by Francis Fauquier, and lived in England until his death at Clifton, Bristol.

== Legacy ==
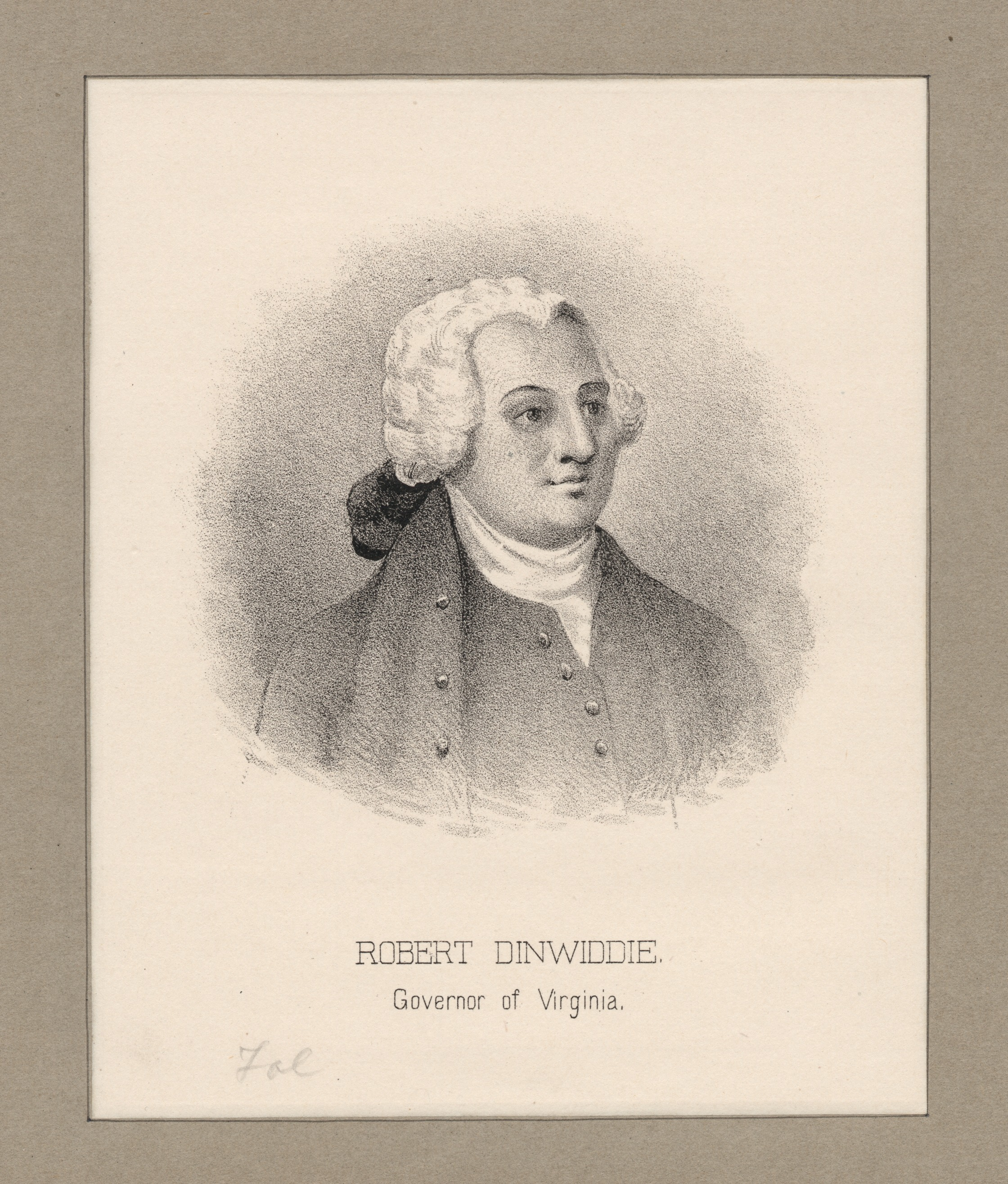
Robert Dinwiddie, governor of Virginia (NYPL NYPG94-F42-419805)

Dinwiddie County, Virginia, which lies 30 miles south of Richmond, is named in honor of Robert Dinwiddie. Dinwiddie Hall, since 1972 a dormitory at the College of William & Mary, is also named in honor of Robert Dinwiddie.

Dinwiddie retained his links with his alma mater throughout his life: in 1754 he was conferred an honorary degree by the University of Glasgow; and upon his death in 1770 he gave the University of Glasgow Library £100 for the procurement of books.

Robert Dinwiddie died of paralysis on July 27, 1770 in Bristol. He was 77 years old. He is buried in Clifton Parish Church with a monument created by William Tyler RA.

He married some time before 1738 Rebecca Auchinleck (or Afflick); together they had two children.

His official records, which were compiled by the Virginia Historical Society in 1883, are left in five volumes. They cover the years of his administration of the Virginia colony, from 1751 to 1758. His archival material resides at several places, and some related to the French and Indian War is visible to web browsers. He was the subject of the book Robert Dinwiddie: Servant of the Crown.

== Arms ==
Coat of arms of Robert Dinwiddie
Crest An eagle preparing for flight holding in his dexter claw a pig all proper. Escutcheon Party per fesse two landskips the uppermost holding a wild Indian at full draught his bow bent, marking at a stag standing at full gaze regardant proper the emblem of the earth, and in base the emblem of water with a sloop under sail, within sight of and making towards a distant land representing America. Motto Ubi libertas ibi patria
