= Royston, Glasgow =

Coordinates: 55.8696°N 4.2325°W

Royston
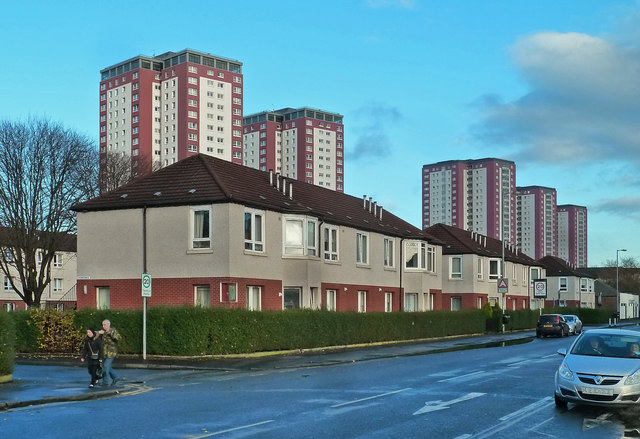
- Houses and tower blocks off Royston Road

- Location within Glasgow
- OS grid reference: NS604663
- Council area: Glasgow City Council
- Lieutenancy area: Glasgow
- Country: Scotland
- Sovereign state: United Kingdom
- Post town: GLASGOW
- Postcode district: G21 2
- Dialling code: 0141
- Police: Scotland
- Fire: Scottish
- Ambulance: Scottish
- UK Parliament: Glasgow North East
- Scottish Parliament: Glasgow Maryhill and Springburn

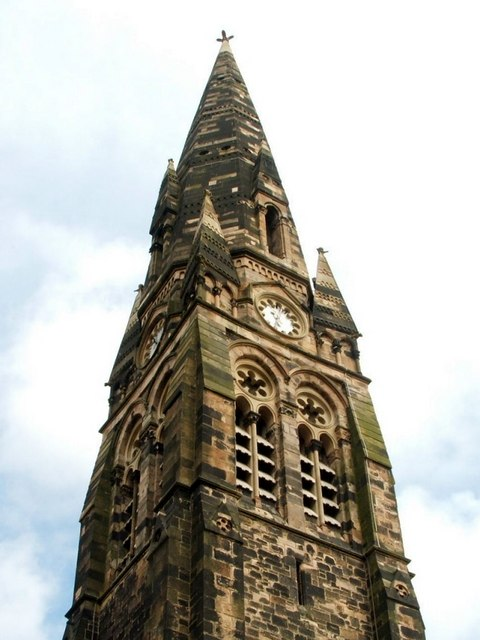
Royston Spire (preserved remnant of demolished Townhead-Blochairn Church)

Royston/Roystonhill is a district in the city of Glasgow, Scotland. It was previously known as The Garngad and is still known as such by residents that have a familial link and is still displayed in local shops and bars. It is notable for its large population of immigrants, mostly of Irish Catholic and African descent.

The district is situated north of the River Clyde and north-east of Glasgow city centre, with its boundaries defined by infrastructure: the neighbourhoods of Sighthill (once the site of the St Rollox Chemical Works) and Townhead are to the west on the opposite side of the A803 road, a dual carriageway urban bypass; Springburn is to the north beyond the sidings and buildings of the former St Rollox railway works and a supermarket built on part of its good depot; Germiston and the Blochairn industrial area are situated to the east on the other side of the North Clyde Line (Springburn branch) railway line; and Dennistoun is to the south on the opposite side of the M8 motorway. Pedestrian footpaths provide access over the roads to Dennistoun and Sighthill, and under their meeting point at the Townhead Interchange towards Glasgow Royal Infirmary. The railway lines once included stations named St Rollox to the north and Garngad to the east, but there are now none serving the area.

In the 1960s, like neighbouring Townhead and Sighthill, Royston was declared a Comprehensive Development Area (CDA) by Glasgow Corporation, which led to the mass demolition of the area's slum tenements. Two new housing estates were built – Royston "A" was approved in 1959, and were Glasgow's second high rise scheme after Moss Heights in Cardonald. The five 20-storey blocks along Charles Street were built by George Wimpey in 1962. Royston "B" was constructed in 1967 and consisted of three colossal 25-storey blocks at 240 Roystonhill, 20 and 40 Rosemount Street on an elevated site overlooking the Monkland Canal (which was filled in during the early 1970s and formed the route of the M8 motorway). The towers were, at the time of their construction the fourth-tallest tower blocks in the city after Bluevale/Whitevale, Red Road and the nearby Balgrayhill estate in Springburn, and were built using the Reema large panel construction method. The "B" towers suffered from severe dampness and condensation problems, which were partially solved through the application of corrugated metal cladding in the early 80s. The block at 240 Roystonhill became the first tower block in Glasgow to be demolished in 1992.

There are few vestiges of the old Roystonhill in evidence these days other than a few street names, some streets having succumbed to development. The church steeple (a listed building, formerly Townhead-Blochairn Church) has been converted into a tower monument and the church hall carries on its service as a local community centre. The former convent has been relocated in the Robroyston area further north. The previous stigma of deprivation earned in its slum years has largely been shed with a recent program of newbuild housing and renovations to social housing (the remaining two tower blocks of the Royston "B" estate at Rosemount Street were demolished in the 2010s, with five others at Charles Street renovated).

The local football team, denominational primary school and secondary school are all named after Saint Roch.

A former member of parliament (MP) for the area, Michael Martin, was Speaker of the House of Commons from 2000 to 2009. During his tenure, the UK parliamentary expenses scandal occurred.

The social club for Catholic community was traditionally known as the 'Hibs Hall'. The Hall was sold by the Ancient Order of Hibernians in 1969 to St. Roch's RC Parish before being sold to a local private concern and renamed "The Huddle Club". The club was burnt down in a fire in the early 21st century.

Royston was the venue for street parties celebrating Celtic F.C. League wins in 1998 and 2001. The first street party was a semi-planned, semi-impromptu gathering along the Royston Road which became the inspiration for the second street party. The street party of 2001 was much more professionally planned and included a stage with live music as well as murals being painted and a video produced to mark the event. There was controversy surrounding this event as the council has never arranged or permitted any such event for Celtic's rivals, Rangers F.C. from across the River Clyde.

== Notable residents ==
- Stevie Chalmers, footballer
- Louie Deadlife, rapper
- Jim Forrest, footballer
- George Gallacher, singer
- Jimmy McGrory, footballer
- Kevin Rutkiewicz, footballer

== See also ==
- Glasgow tower blocks
