= St Roch's Secondary School =

St. Roch's Secondary School
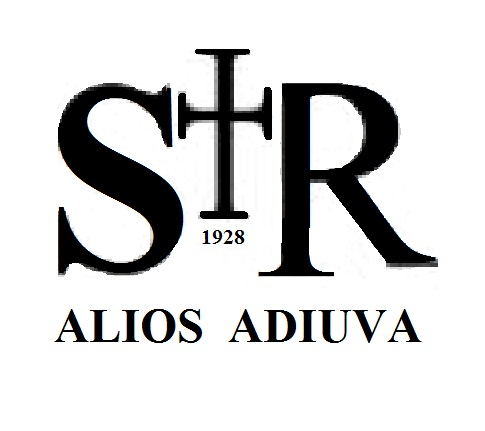

Location
- 25 Rhymer Street; Glasgow G21 2NF; Scotland; 55.86871°N 4.2315°W

Information
- Type: State, coeducational
- Motto: ALIOS ADIUVA (Help Others)
- Religious affiliation: Roman Catholic
- Established: 1928
- Principal: Kevin Herron
- Student to teacher ratio: 54.7
- Website: www.st-rochs-sec.glasgow.sch.uk

St. Roch's Secondary School is a Roman Catholic secondary school located in Royston, Glasgow. It is named for the Christian Saint Roch.

== Notable alumni ==
- Willie Bain – Labour Member of Parliament for Glasgow North East
- Mo Johnston – Celtic, Rangers, Nantes, Scotland football player, first high-profile Catholic to play for Rangers post-World War II
- Stevie Chalmers – Celtic, Partick Thistle and Scotland – a member of the Lisbon Lions team that won the European Cup
- Peter McAleese - former Special Air Service commando & mercenary who was contracted to assassinate Pablo Escobar in the late 1980s
