= Provanmill =

Coordinates: 55.878°N 4.195°W

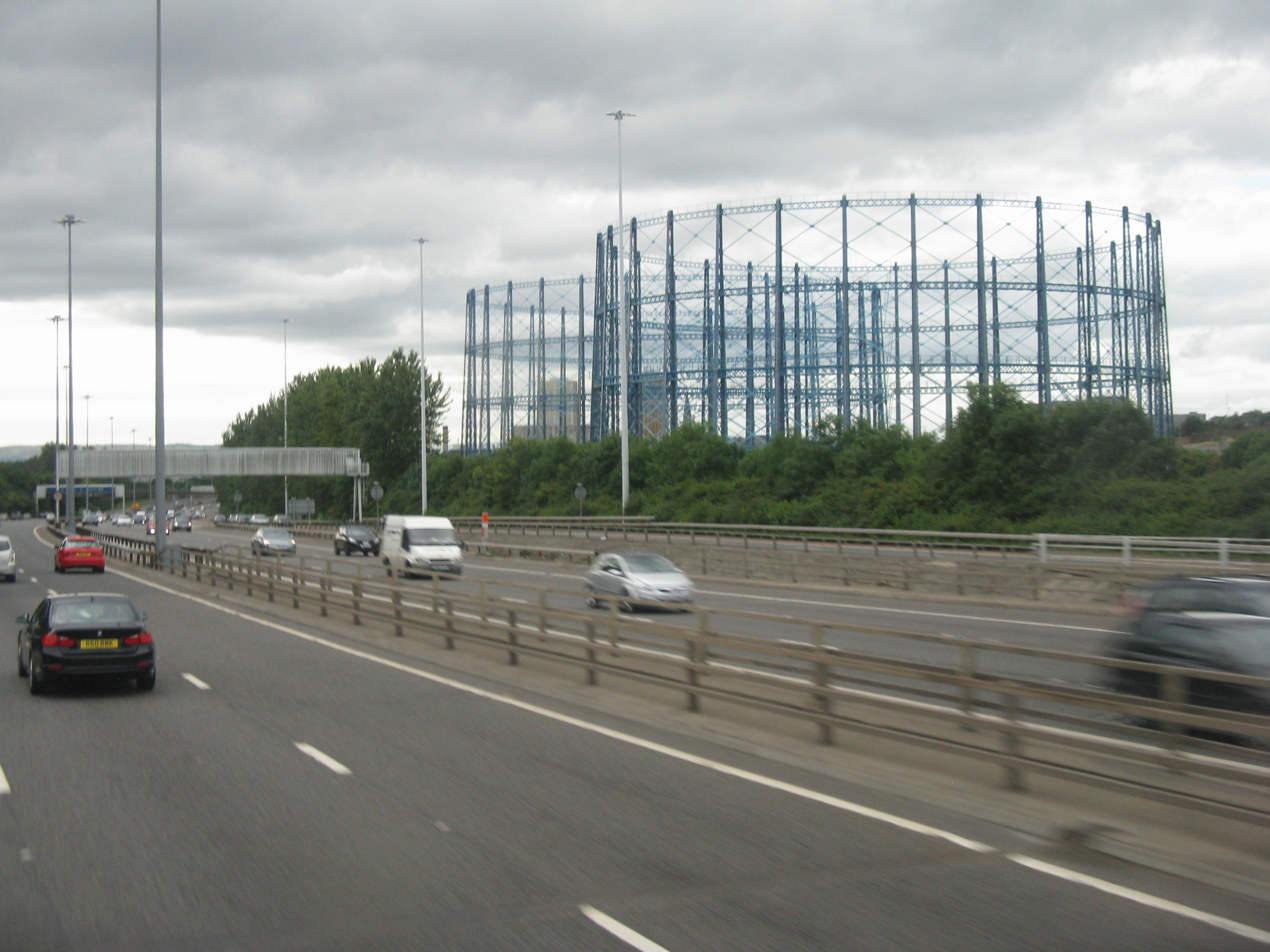
- Gasholders at Provanmill, 2013

- Location within Glasgow
- OS grid reference: NS626671
- Council area: Glasgow City Council
- Lieutenancy area: Glasgow
- Country: Scotland
- Sovereign state: United Kingdom
- Post town: GLASGOW
- Postcode district: G33 1
- Dialling code: 0141
- Police: Scotland
- Fire: Scottish
- Ambulance: Scottish
- UK Parliament: Glasgow North East
- Scottish Parliament: Glasgow Provan

Provanmill is a district in the Scottish city of Glasgow. It lies to the north east of the city centre. In the mid-19th century it was a small hamlet with a grain mill, blacksmith's, cartwright's and hostelry. As Glasgow expanded, it became part of the city. Since the 1950s, the area became a major area of deprivation, with chronic housing and drug-related crime problems, although in the early 21st century the image of Provanmill and its surrounding areas is improving. Blackhill, one of the most notorious housing estates in the area, was demolished in 1990 to make way for the M80 Stepps bypass.

Provanmill and Blackhill were known for being majority Irish Catholic and still to this day the demographics show that the areas, as well as nearby Royston (previously known as the Garngad), remain predominantly Catholic and still feature Irish republican marches annually. The area was also the home of infamous Glasgow gangster Arthur Thompson (a.k.a. "The Glasgow Godfather").

Provanmill's most famous landmark is the iconic twin gasometers of the now largely disused Provan Gas Works, which have become a portal into the city for motorists arriving on the adjacent M8 and M80 motorways.
