= Blochairn =

Coordinates: 55.8699°N 4.2166°W

Blochairn: Scottish Gaelic: Baile a' Chàirn
- Location within Glasgow
- OS grid reference: NS614663
- Council area: Glasgow City Council
- Lieutenancy area: Glasgow
- Country: Scotland
- Sovereign state: United Kingdom
- Post town: GLASGOW
- Postcode district: G21
- Dialling code: 0141
- Police: Scotland
- Fire: Scottish
- Ambulance: Scottish
- UK Parliament: Glasgow North East
- Scottish Parliament: Glasgow Maryhill and Springburn

Blochairn (/blɒˈxɛərn/, Scottish Gaelic: Baile a' Chàirn, lit. 'Town of the Cairn') is a district in the Scottish city of Glasgow, situated north of the River Clyde.

The district lies on either side of the main Blochairn Road. In 1969 the Blochairn Fruit Market opened there, next to a junction on the M8. The market occupies 32 acres (13 ha) and has 74 fruit and vegetable stalls and six fish stalls; it also handles flowers. It operates 24 hours a day and handles over two million tons of produce per year; it is used by caterers and food processors throughout central and western Scotland and also in Northern Ireland and Northern England. It has been Scotland's largest outdoor market since the closure of Ingliston Market in Edinburgh.

The Fruit Market was previously located near Glasgow Cross. When it was relocated, the housing in the area, which was prefabricated and contained asbestos, was removed. The local pub, the Blochairn Bar, known as 'The Budgie', in 1978 was the first pub in Scotland to be granted extended licensing hours, from 8 a.m. to 11 p.m., to serve the market shift workers.
