= 2009 Glasgow North East by-election =

2009 UK Parliamentary by-election

- 12 November 2009
- Turnout: 33.2%
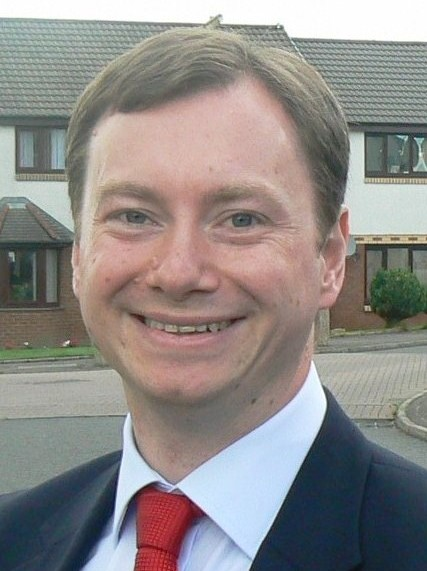

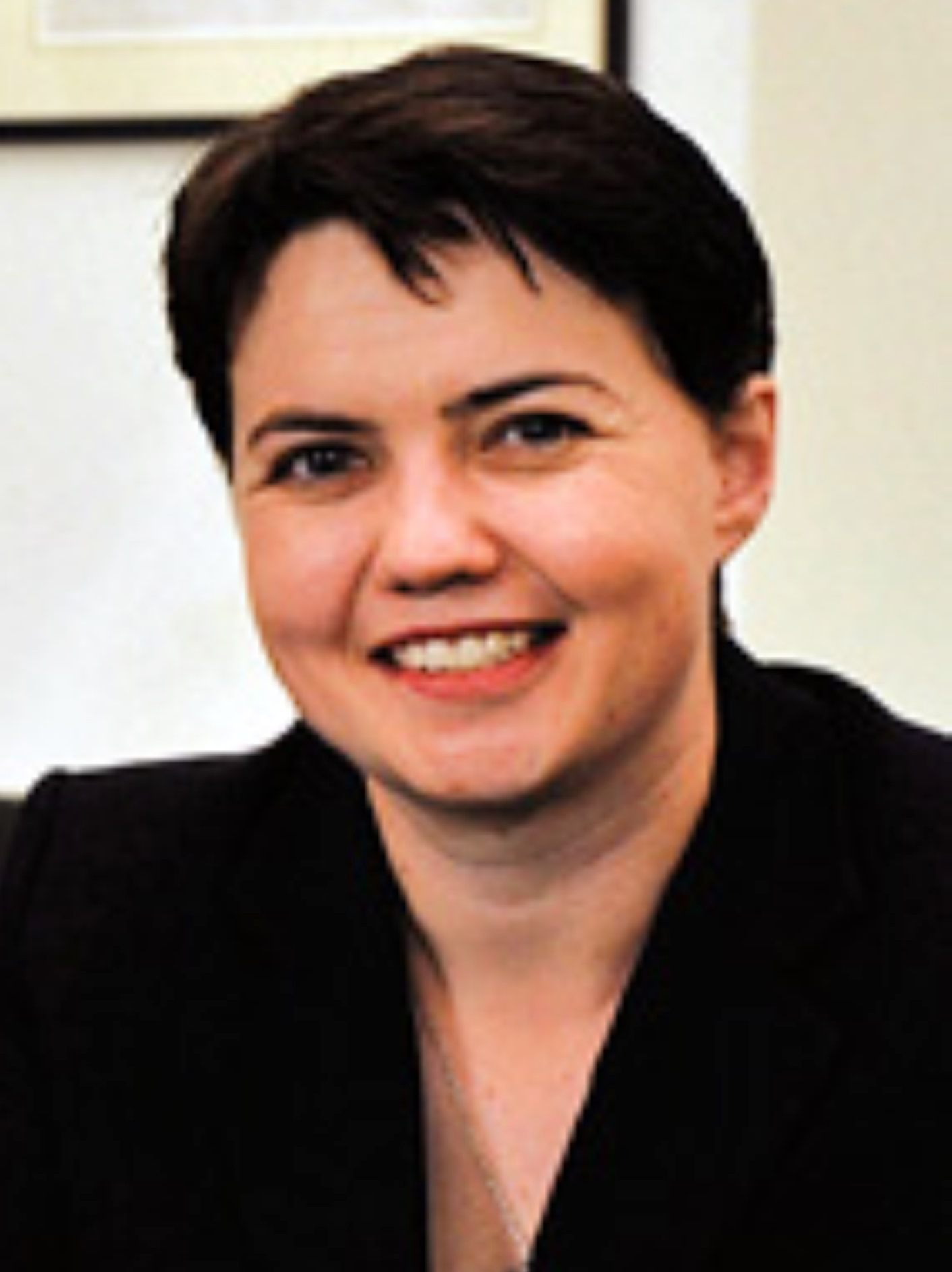
		SNP
Candidate	Willie Bain	David Kerr	Ruth Davidson
Party	Labour	SNP	Conservative
Popular vote	12,231	4,120	1,075
Percentage	59.4%	20.0%	5.2%
MP before election
Michael Martin
Speaker
Elected MP
Willie Bain
Labour

A by-election for the United Kingdom parliamentary constituency of Glasgow North East was held on 12 November 2009, following the resignation of incumbent member of Parliament (MP) Michael Martin both as an MP and as Speaker of the House of Commons following the MPs' expenses scandal. It was won by Willie Bain of the Labour Party with 59% of the vote.

It is general convention that mainstream political parties do not contest elections against sitting Speakers of the House of Commons. As such, Martin won the seat without his former Labour Party label since he was elected Speaker in 2000 and neither the Conservative nor Liberal Democrat parties had fought the constituency—or its predecessor, Glasgow Springburn—in either 2001 or 2005.

Just 33% of the electorate voted, which was the then-lowest ever percentage turnout in a Scottish by-election to the House of Commons. This was the last by-election of the 2005–2010 parliament.

== Background ==
Speaker of the House of Commons Michael Martin resigned as an MP and as Speaker on 21 June 2009 following the MPs' expenses scandal. There was a longer than normal gap between a seat falling vacant and the by-election. On 22 July, during a brief debate in the House of Commons, the UK Government refused to move the writ to trigger a by-election before the summer recess.

== Candidates ==
Labour selected Willie Bain, a law lecturer and Constituency Labour Party secretary, as their candidate. Michael Martin's son Paul Martin, the MSP for the roughly equivalent Glasgow Springburn Scottish Parliament constituency, had ruled himself out.

The Scottish National Party (SNP) selected David Kerr. They had previously selected James Dornan, their leader on Glasgow City Council, but on 12 July he announced that he was withdrawing as a candidate following allegations in the Sunday Herald over past financial difficulties.

The Conservative Party selected Ruth Davidson, a journalist and broadcaster, as well as a Territorial Army volunteer and Sunday school teacher.

The Scottish Liberal Democrats selected the South Lanarkshire councillor Eileen Baxendale as their candidate.

The Scottish Socialist Party decided to stand Kevin McVey, a party organiser from Cumbernauld who promised to reject the £64,000 MP's salary and "live instead on the average skilled worker's wage – not a penny more". On the ballot paper the party opted to use the description "Scottish Socialist Party – Make Greed History"

Solidarity initially called on the SSP, the Socialist Labour Party and themselves to adopt a "left unity" candidate. However, they later announced that they had selected Tommy Sheridan to fight the by-election, claiming he might have stood down in favour of a left unity candidate. On the ballot paper the party used the full description "Solidarity – Scotland's Socialist Movement"

Former Big Brother housemate Mikey Hughes stood as an independent candidate.

The British National Party (BNP) selected Charlie Baillie as their candidate who stood as second candidate on the list for Scotland in the 2009 European Election.

The Jury Team, an umbrella organisation aiming to support Independent candidates in UK elections, selected John Smeaton, the former Glasgow Airport baggage handler who became known for his intervention during the 2007 Glasgow Airport attack as its first candidate for a Westminster election. On declaration of his candidacy in September, he was given the third shortest odds to win the seat.

David Doherty, an environmental protection graduate of the University of Strathclyde, was the Scottish Green Party candidate.

The Socialist Labour Party stood Louise McDaid, who topped their party list for Scotland in the 2009 European Election.

Mev Brown stood as an independent candidate. Colin Campbell stood for The Individuals Labour and Tory (TILT).

Official candidate names and ballot paper descriptions were confirmed by Glasgow City Council on 28 October 2009.

== Result ==
2009 Glasgow North East by-election
Party	Candidate	Votes	%	±%
Labour	Willie Bain	12,231	59.4	New
SNP	David Kerr	4,120	20.0	+2.3
Conservative	Ruth Davidson	1,075	5.2	New
BNP	Charlie Baillie	1,013	4.9	+1.7
Solidarity	Tommy Sheridan	794	3.9	New
Liberal Democrats	Eileen Baxendale	474	2.3	New
Green	David Doherty	332	1.6	New
Jury Team	John Smeaton	258	1.2	New
Scottish Socialist	Kevin McVey	152	0.7	–4.2
No Label	Mikey Hughes	54	0.3	New
Socialist Labour	Louise McDaid	47	0.2	–14.0
Independent	Mev Brown	32	0.2	New
The Individuals Labour and Tory (TILT)	Colin Campbell	13	0.1	New
Majority		8,111	39.4	+3.8
Turnout		20,595	33.2	–12.6
Labour gain from Speaker		Swing		

== 2005 UK election result ==
General election 2005: Glasgow North East
Party	Candidate	Votes	%	±%
Speaker	Michael Martin	15,153	53.3	−13.8
SNP	John McLaughlin	5,019	17.7	−0.5
Socialist Labour	Doris Kelly	4,036	14.2	New
Scottish Socialist	Graham Campbell	1,402	4.9	−3.2
Scottish Unionist	Daniel Houston	1,266	4.5	+0.3
BNP	Scott McLean	920	3.2	New
Independent	Joe Chambers	622	2.2	New
Majority		10,134	35.6	−13.3
Turnout		28,418	45.8	+1.9
Speaker hold		Swing	-6.6	

== See also ==
- 2009 Speaker of the British House of Commons election
