= Glasgow North East =

UK Parliament constituency (since 2005)

Coordinates: 55°53′18″N 4°12′57″W

- Burgh constituency for the House of Commons
- Interactive map of boundaries from 2024
- Location within Scotland
- Subdivision: Glasgow City
- Electorate: 75,236 (March 2020)
- Major settlements: Possilpark, Springburn

Current constituency
- Created: 2005
- Member of Parliament: Maureen Burke (Labour)
- Created from: Glasgow Springburn; Glasgow Maryhill

Glasgow North East is a burgh constituency of the House of Commons of the Parliament of the United Kingdom (at Westminster). It was first contested at the 2005 general election. The current Member of Parliament (MP) is Maureen Burke of the Labour Party who gained the seat from Scottish National Party's Anne McLaughlin at the 2024 general election.

== History ==
From the seat's creation until 2009, the constituency was represented by Michael Martin, previously MP for Glasgow Springburn from 1979. Martin was elected Speaker of the House of Commons in October 2000, but in May 2009 he announced that he would be resigning as Speaker on 21 June 2009 because of his perceived role in the MPs' expenses controversy. He was the first Speaker in 300 years to be forced out of office by a motion of no confidence. He also resigned as an MP the following day, resulting in a by-election on 12 November 2009, which was won by Willie Bain of the Labour Party with 59% of the vote.

Bain retained the seat the following year at the 2010 general election, but was defeated by Anne McLaughlin of the SNP in 2015. The seat was regained by Labour's candidate Paul Sweeney at the 2017 snap general election, only to be regained by McLaughlin at the 2019 general election.

== Constituency profile ==
Glasgow North East is one of six constituencies covering the Glasgow City council area. All are entirely within the council area. The population of the constituency was 88,156 at the time of the 2011 UK Census. The 2005–2024 version of the seat comprises the communities of Ruchill, Hamiltonhill, Possilpark, Port Dundas, Sighthill, Lambhill, Colston, Milton, Springburn, Royston, Balornock, Barmulloch, Blackhill, Blochairn, Dennistoun, Germiston, Haghill, Carntyne, Robroyston, Provanmill, Riddrie, Hogganfield, Wallacewell, Millerston and Ruchazie.

=== Voting pattern ===
Glasgow North East and its predecessor constituencies had been represented by MPs from the Labour Party with large majorities for eighty years from the 1935 general election until the 2015 general election, when the seat was gained by the SNP during their landslide victory; which ended 51 years of dominance by Scottish Labour. The change at Glasgow North East was the largest swing recorded at the general election that year of 39.3% from Labour to SNP. At the following snap election, held just two years later, the seat was regained on a 12% swing by the Labour and Co-operative candidate Paul Sweeney with a narrow majority of 242 votes (0.7%). However, the SNP regained the seat with a marginal majority of 7% in 2019.

According to the British Election Study, it is the most left-wing seat in the country.

It had the lowest turnout of any constituency at the 2017 general election.

== Boundaries ==
=== 2005–2024 ===
Map of boundaries 2005–2024

Prior to the 2005 general election, the city area was covered by ten constituencies, two of which straddled the boundaries of other council areas. The North East constituency includes most of the former Glasgow Springburn constituency and a small part of the former Glasgow Maryhill constituency.

The constituency partially overlaps with two Scottish Parliament seats: Glasgow Maryhill and Springburn and Glasgow Provan.

Under the Fifth Review of UK Parliament constituencies which came into effect for the 2005 general election, the boundaries were defined in accordance with the ward structure in place on 30 November 2004 as containing the Glasgow City Council wards of Milton, Ashfield, Keppochhill, Royston, Cowlairs, Springburn, Wallacewell, Milnbank, Dennistoun, Carntyne, Robroyston and Gartcraig. Further to reviews of local government ward boundaries which came into effect in 2007 and 2017, but did not affect the parliamentary boundaries, the constituency comprised the City of Glasgow Council wards or part wards of: Calton (small part), Canal (majority), Springburn/Robroyston, East Centre (minority), North East (minority), and Dennistoun.

=== 2024–present ===
Map of boundaries from 2024

Further to the 2023 review of Westminster constituencies, which came into effect for the 2024 general election the constituency boundaries were significantly re-drawn to take in areas of Glasgow East to the north of the main east-west railway, including the districts of Queenslie, Greenfield, Barlanark, Garthamlock and Easterhouse. To compensate, western areas, including Milton, Cowlairs and Port Dundas, were transferred to Glasgow North.

The constituency currently consists of the following wards or part wards of the City of Glasgow:

- A small part of Calton ward - comprising the strip between the main east-west railway and Duke Street;
- a small part of Anderston/City/Yorkhill ward around Townhead;
- a very small part of Canal ward;
- the whole of Springburn/Robroyston ward;
- the whole of East Centre ward;
- a small part of Baillieston ward - comprising the area between the main east-west railway and the M8;
- the whole of North East ward; and
- the whole of Dennistoun ward.

== Members of Parliament ==
Election	Member	Party	Notes
2005	Michael Martin	Speaker	Previously MP for Glasgow Springburn from 1979. Resigned the Speakership and from Parliament in 2009
2009 by-election	Willie Bain	Labour	
2015	Anne McLaughlin	SNP	
2017	Paul Sweeney	Labour Co-op	
2019	Anne McLaughlin	SNP	
2024	Maureen Burke	Labour	

== Election results ==
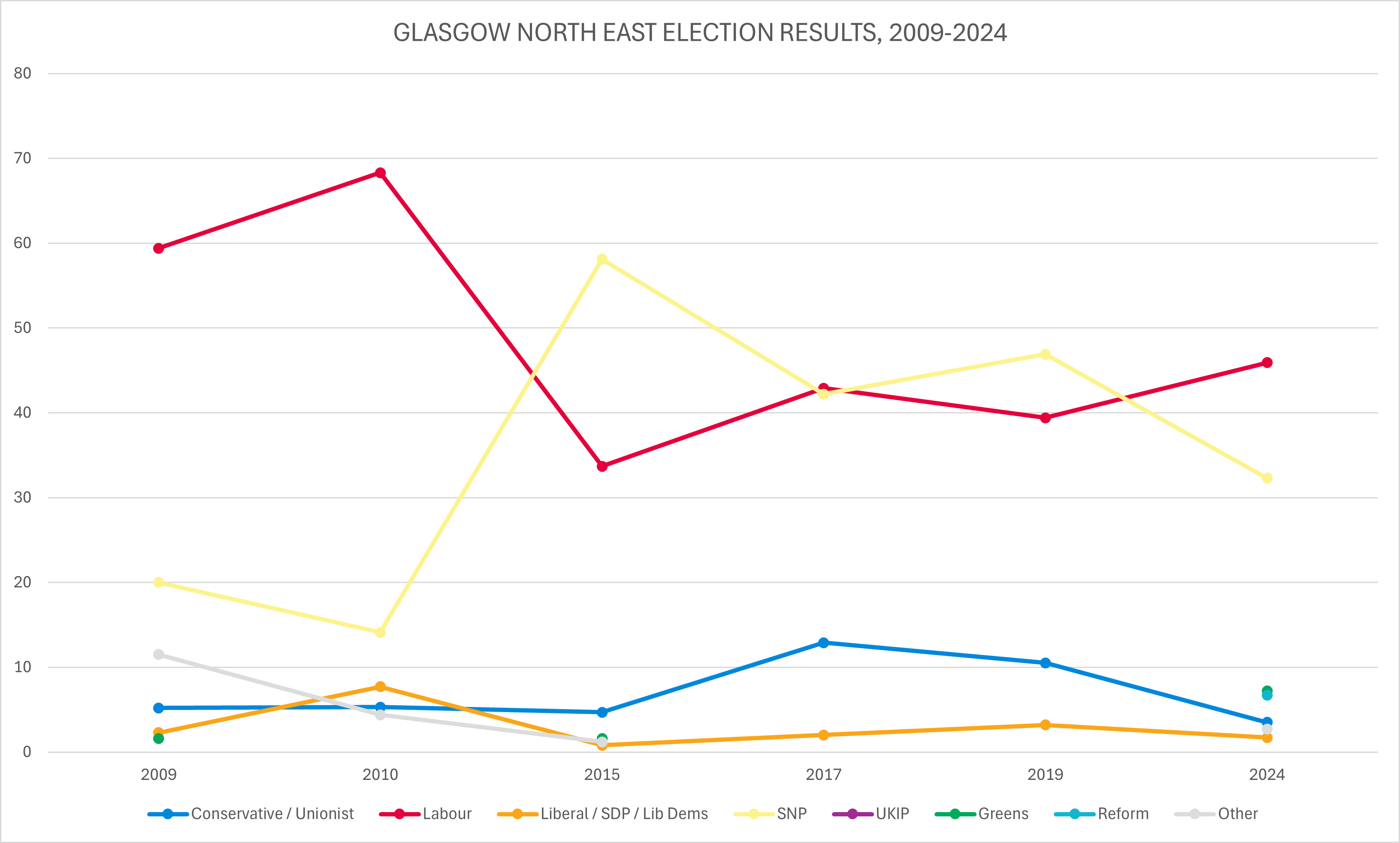
Election results 2009-2024

=== Elections in the 2020s ===
General election 2024: Glasgow North East
Party	Candidate	Votes	%	±%
Labour	Maureen Burke	15,639	45.9	+8.2
SNP	Anne McLaughlin	11,002	32.3	−15.4
Green	Ewan Lewis	2,471	7.2	+7.0
Reform	Jonathan Walmsley	2,272	6.7	N/A
Conservative	Robert Henry Connelly	1,182	3.5	−7.5
Liberal Democrats	Sheila Thomson	592	1.7	−1.7
Alba	Catherine McKernan	551	1.6	N/A
TUSC	Chris Sermanni	236	0.7	N/A
Communist	Gary Steele	146	0.4	N/A
Majority		4,637	13.6	N/A
Turnout		34,091	47.1	−9.7
Registered electors		72,610		
Labour gain from SNP		Swing	+11.8	

=== Elections in the 2010s ===
2019 notional result (Note: Estimate of the 2019 general election result as if the revised boundaries recommended under the 2023 boundary review were in place)
Party	Vote	%
SNP	20,375	47.7
Labour	16,098	37.7
Conservative	4,686	11.0
Liberal Democrats	1,449	3.4
Scottish Greens	65	0.2
Majority	4,277	10.0
Turnout	42,673	56.7
Electorate	75,236	

General election 2019: Glasgow North East
Party	Candidate	Votes	%	±%
SNP	Anne McLaughlin	15,911	46.9	+4.7
Labour Co-op	Paul Sweeney	13,363	39.4	−3.5
Conservative	Lauren Bennie	3,558	10.5	−2.4
Liberal Democrats	Nicolas Moohan	1,093	3.2	+1.2
Majority		2,548	7.5	N/A
Turnout		33,925	55.5	+2.5
SNP gain from Labour Co-op		Swing	+4.1	

General election 2017: Glasgow North East
Party	Candidate	Votes	%	±%
Labour Co-op	Paul Sweeney	13,637	42.9	+9.2
SNP	Anne McLaughlin	13,395	42.2	−15.9
Conservative	Jack Wylie	4,106	12.9	+8.2
Liberal Democrats	Daniel Donaldson	637	2.0	+1.2
Majority		242	0.7	N/A
Turnout		31,775	53.0	−3.8
Labour Co-op gain from SNP		Swing	+12.6	

General election 2015: Glasgow North East
Party	Candidate	Votes	%	±%
SNP	Anne McLaughlin	21,976	58.1	+44.0
Labour	Willie Bain	12,754	33.7	−34.6
Conservative	Annie Wells	1,769	4.7	−0.6
Green	Zara Kitson	615	1.6	New
Liberal Democrats	Eileen Baxendale	300	0.8	−6.9
CISTA	Geoff Johnson	225	0.6	New
TUSC	Jamie Cocozza	218	0.6	0.0
Majority		9,222	24.4	N/A
Turnout		37,857	56.8	+7.7
SNP gain from Labour		Swing	+39.3^{1}	

This was the largest swing of any UK constituency in the 2015 election.

General election 2010: Glasgow North East
Party	Candidate	Votes	%	±%
Labour	Willie Bain	20,100	68.3	N/A
SNP	Billy McAllister	4,158	14.1	−3.6
Liberal Democrats	Eileen Baxendale	2,262	7.7	N/A
Conservative	Ruth Davidson	1,569	5.3	N/A
BNP	Walter Hamilton	798	2.7	−0.5
TUSC	Graham Campbell	187	0.6	New
Scottish Socialist	Kevin McVey	179	0.6	−4.3
Socialist Labour	Jim Berrington	156	0.5	−13.7
Majority		15,942	54.2	N/A
Turnout		29,409	49.1	+3.3
Labour hold		Swing	+7.4	

=== Elections in the 2000s ===
A by-election was held in November 2009, caused by the resignation of former Speaker of the House of Commons Michael Martin. Labour won fairly comfortably, compared to the surprising SNP win in the neighbouring constituency of Glasgow East in the previous year. The turnout was the lowest in Scottish history.

2009 Glasgow North East by-election
Party	Candidate	Votes	%	±%
Labour	Willie Bain	12,231	59.4	New
SNP	David Kerr	4,120	20.0	+2.3
Conservative	Ruth Davidson	1,075	5.2	New
BNP	Charlie Baillie	1,013	4.9	+1.7
Solidarity	Tommy Sheridan	794	3.9	New
Liberal Democrats	Eileen Baxendale	474	2.3	New
Green	David Doherty	332	1.6	New
Jury Team	John Smeaton	258	1.2	New
Scottish Socialist	Kevin McVey	152	0.7	−4.2
No Label	Mikey Hughes	54	0.3	New
Socialist Labour	Louise McDaid	47	0.2	−14.0
Independent	Mev Brown	32	0.2	New
The Individuals Labour and Tory (TILT)	Colin Campbell	13	0.1	New
Majority		8,111	39.4	+3.8
Turnout		20,595	33.2	−12.6
Labour gain from Speaker		Swing		

General election 2005: Glasgow North East
Party	Candidate	Votes	%	±%
Speaker	Michael Martin ^{1}	15,153	53.3	−13.8
SNP	John McLaughlin	5,019	17.7	−0.5
Socialist Labour	Doris Kelly	4,036	14.2	New
Scottish Socialist	Graham Campbell	1,402	4.9	−3.2
Scottish Unionist	Daniel Houston	1,266	4.5	+0.3
BNP	Scott McLean	920	3.2	New
Independent	Joe Chambers	622	2.2	New
Majority		10,134	35.6	−13.3
Turnout		28,418	45.8	+1.9
Speaker hold		Swing	−6.6	

^{1} Michael Martin stood as 'the Speaker seeking re-election'. The Speaker is elected by the House of Commons after each General Election.

As is conventional, Michael Martin (a member of the Labour Party when first elected Speaker) stood as Speaker of the House of Commons in the general election of 2005. The Conservatives and the Liberal Democrats did not stand against him. Other parties did, including the Scottish National Party (the Constitution of which requires that the party fight every seat in Scotland).

The most notable feature of the result was the relatively large vote for Arthur Scargill's Socialist Labour Party, in an area where it had very little base. This was considered to be a result of voter confusion (and not the first recorded example of its kind). A large number of traditional Labour Party voters may have voted for the Socialist Labour Party in the absence of a named Labour Party candidate on the ballot paper.

== See also ==
- Politics of Glasgow

== Notes ==
Parliament of the United Kingdom
Preceded by Glasgow Springburn	Constituency represented by the speaker 2005–2009	Succeeded by Buckingham
