= Willie Bain =

Scottish politician

William Bain
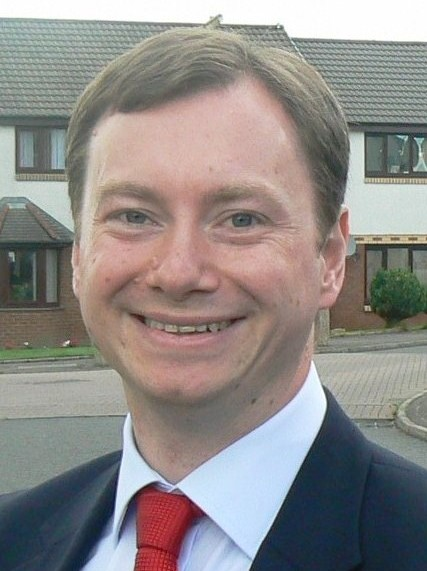
- Bain in 2009

Shadow Minister for Scotland
- In office 8 October 2011 – 8 October 2013
- Leader: Ed Miliband
- Preceded by: Tom Greatrex
- Succeeded by: Gordon Banks

Shadow Minister for Food
- In office 27 May 2010 – 8 October 2011
- Leader: Harriet Harman (Acting); Ed Miliband
- Preceded by: Richard Benyon
- Succeeded by: Fiona O'Donnell

Member of Parliament for Glasgow North East
- In office 12 November 2009 – 30 March 2015
- Preceded by: Michael Martin
- Succeeded by: Anne McLaughlin

Personal details
- Born: 29 November 1972 (age 53) Springburn, Glasgow, Scotland
- Party: Labour
- Education: Strathclyde University
- Profession: Policy Advisor

William Thomas Bain (born 29 November 1972) is a Scottish politician who served as Member of Parliament (MP) for Glasgow North East from 2009 to 2015. A member of the Labour Party, he was a Shadow DEFRA Minister from 2010 to 2011 and a Shadow Scotland Minister from 2011 to 2013.

== Early life and career ==
Born at Stobhill Hospital in Glasgow, son of William, a lift engineer, and Catherine, a payroll clerk, Willie Bain grew up in the Carron area of Springburn.

Raised in the Roman Catholic faith, Bain attended St Roch's Secondary School and Strathclyde University, graduating with an LLB in 1995. Thereafter, he completed a Diploma in Legal Practice in 1996, and moved into part-time lecturing and research at the University of Strathclyde Law School, working with the Law School's Centre for Parliamentary and Legislative Studies on research projects on devolution.

He completed an LLM by Research in Constitutional Law in 2004 and subsequently became a senior lecturer in Public and European law at London South Bank University between 2004 and 2009. He was secretary of the Glasgow North East Constituency Labour Party and its predecessor constituency, Glasgow Springburn, from 1999 to 2009. Bain is a member of Unite, Progress, the Fabian Society, and Amnesty International.

== Parliamentary career ==
Following the resignation of local MP and Speaker of the House of Commons Michael Martin, William Bain was selected by the local CLP as the Labour candidate in the 2009 Glasgow North East by-election, subsequently winning the seat.

Under the leadership of Ed Miliband, Bain served as Shadow Minister for Food and was later Shadow Scotland Office Minister, supporting the Shadow Scottish Secretary Margaret Curran.

In 2012, Bain stated that the Scottish Labour MPs have a convention of not supporting motions put down by the Scottish National Party, which became known as the "Bain principle".

Bain, like most Labour MPs in Scotland, lost his seat in 2015 to the SNP, with Anne McLaughlin winning the seat.

== Post-Parliamentary career ==
After leaving parliament in 2015, he became Head of Fintech & Financial Services at Inline Policy, a political consultancy, before moving to the British Retail Consortium in 2017, where he advised on Brexit and trade policy, and then onto the British Chambers of Commerce as the Head of Trade Policy.

Parliament of the United Kingdom
Preceded by Michael Martin	Member of Parliament for Glasgow North East; 2009 – 2015	Succeeded by Anne McLaughlin
