= John Smeaton (born 1976) =

Former baggage handler at Glasgow Airport (born 1976)

John Smeaton QGM
- Born: 1976 (age 49–50); Bishopton, Scotland
- Occupation: Senior ramp assistant
- Known for: Intervention during the 2007 Glasgow Airport attack; Candidacy in 2009 Glasgow North East by-election

John Smeaton QGM (born 1976) is a former baggage handler at Glasgow Airport. He became known after being involved in thwarting the 2007 Glasgow Airport attack.

Smeaton lives in Erskine, Renfrewshire, a town outside the city and near the airport. Brought up in Erskine, he was educated at Park Mains High School. Smeaton stood as an Independent candidate in the 2009 Glasgow North East by-election.

== Glasgow Airport attack ==
Smeaton, a baggage handler, was off duty when he saw the incident start to develop on 30 June 2007. During his break he observed two men driving a burning Jeep filled with flammable gas cylinders into the airport entrance. He heard three explosions and ran over to help.

It was reported that Smeaton shouted "fuckin' mon, then" and kicked Kafeel Ahmed in the groin. Ahmed suffered burns over 90% of his body and died later in hospital. During the incident Smeaton also helped drag Michael Kerr, who also intervened in the event, to safety. Kerr had been left lying with a broken leg beside the burning Jeep after also kicking Ahmed.

The incident has been described as inspiring others to take personal initiative and act decisively in a crisis. Newsagent and former policeman Mohammed Afzah later cited Smeaton as an inspiration for his facing down and repelling a would-be armed robber.

== Television interviews ==
Following the attack, Smeaton gave television interviews to the BBC, ITV and CNN which were broadcast worldwide.

- Asked by ITV News what his message to terrorists was, he said:

"Glasgow doesn't accept this. This is Glasgow; we'll set about ye."

== Tribute website and media attention ==
A tribute website set up in Smeaton's honour received 500,000 hits in its first 48 hours. The website urged visitors to buy a pint of beer for him; over 1,000 pints were donated within two days. The BBC reported on 18 July 2007 that John Smeaton had pledged half of the money donated for pints of beer to the veteran's charity Erskine, which cares for former servicemen and women at five homes throughout Scotland. The balance of the money was to be used to fund a night out for those who had also assisted at the incident at Glasgow Airport.

A Bebo group was also set up in dedication to Smeaton, called the John Smeaton Fan Club. Over 550 Bebo members had joined the club within 48 hours, and this page also received exposure in the Daily Record. A Facebook group called the John Smeaton Appreciation Society was also established with over 4,000 members; this refers to Smeaton as: "Glasgow's Jack Bauer".

Smeaton was also the subject of a front-page article in The Wall Street Journal.

In the weeks after the attack, Smeaton made a variety of public appearances and interviews including appearing on the pitch at Ibrox Stadium before a Rangers home game. and meeting Prime Minister Gordon Brown at 10 Downing Street. He also appeared at the Edinburgh Festival Fringe.

He was invited to appear at the World Trade Center ground zero for the sixth anniversary of the September 11, 2001 attacks. He also appeared on Richard & Judy.

Smeaton revealed in an October 2007 interview with Loaded magazine journalist Jeff Maysh that he feared "a jihad or a fatwa being issued" against him, but added, "that would just be fate. I can't stop a bloke with an AK47. One thing is for certain, they'll have to kill me. They'll never take me alive."

== Awards ==
On 18 December 2007, it was announced that Smeaton was to be awarded the Queen's Gallantry Medal for his actions; this was presented by Queen Elizabeth II at a ceremony at Buckingham Palace on 4 March 2008.

Smeaton was one of four members of the public who were presented with a Daily Mirror Pride of Britain award in 2007. In December 2007, Smeaton was presented with a CNN Everyday Superhero Award in New York. Smeaton was named as one of the ten "Top Scots 2007" by Scotland on Sunday.

== Doubts ==
In March 2008, reports began to circulate in the national press that Smeaton's involvement in the incident had been exaggerated, and that others, who had done more to restrain the attackers, had not been recognised with awards such as the Queen's Gallantry Medal. Alex McIlveen, who tore a tendon in his foot while tackling burning Kafeel Ahmed, told reporters: "John Smeaton is not telling the whole truth. When it came to tackling the bombers, he didn't land a blow." Smeaton denied claims that he was a fake; and pointed out that he had already stated in 2007 that he felt the press were not giving enough credit to the others involved.

== 2009 Glasgow North East by-election ==
On 25 September 2009, it was announced that Smeaton would stand as an Independent candidate in the 2009 Glasgow North East by-election called as a result of the resignation of the former Speaker of the House Michael Martin in the aftermath of the MP's expenses scandal. Smeaton was the first Jury Team-supported independent to be selected for a Westminster election, following the umbrella organisation's launch in March 2009, and their backing of 59 candidates in the 4 June 2009 European elections. Labour won the seat with 12,231 votes while Smeaton polled 258 votes; eighth amongst 13 candidates. Smeaton's by-election campaign was the subject of a BBC One documentary titled Make Me an MP, aired on 18 November 2009.
