= Charles Emmott =

British politician (1899–1953)

Charles Ernest George Campbell Emmott (12 November 1898 – 14 April 1953) was a British barrister who served as Unionist Member of Parliament (MP) for Glasgow Springburn between the 1931 and 1935 general elections, and then a Conservative MP for East Surrey until the 1945 general election.

== Biography ==
Emmott was born on 12 November 1898, the son of Charles Emmott of Oldham by his wife, the Lady Constance Campbell, one of the many daughters of the 8th Duke of Argyll.

In his youth he attended Lancing College in Sussex, England, before moving on to Christ Church, Oxford where he was a classical scholar. Like many of his generation, he fought in the First World War, serving in France in 1917–19 and rising to the rank of second lieutenant. He was called to the bar (Middle Temple) in 1924.

He contested Preston in 1929, and was returned for Glasgow Springburn. In 1935, he moved to the safe Conservative seat of East Surrey, where he remained until 1945.

During the Second World War, he served with the Royal Air Force concurrently with his service in the House of Commons.

He was received into the Roman Catholic Church in 1948.

Parliament of the United Kingdom
Preceded by George Hardie	Member of Parliament for Glasgow Springburn; 1931–1935	Succeeded by George Hardie
Preceded by James Galbraith	Member of Parliament for East Surrey; 1935–1945	Succeeded by Michael Astor
