= John Forman (British politician) =

British insurance agent and politician

John Calder Forman (1884 – 14 April 1975) was a British insurance agent and politician.

== Municipal life ==
John Forman began his political career on Glasgow Corporation in 1928. He was appointed a Baillie and was Chairman of the Public Assistance Committee; in 1935 he was appointed to a Scottish Office committee investigating the operation of the Poor Law. He also served on Rent Tribunals under the Rent of Furnished Houses Control (Scotland) Act 1943, determining the fair rent for private tenancies.

== Election to Parliament ==
At the 1945, Forman was elected as a Labour and Co-operative Member of Parliament for Glasgow Springburn. After he had taken the oath, it was noticed that his position on the Rent Tribunals was remunerated and that he therefore might hold an 'office of profit under the Crown' which would disqualify him from election. A Select Committee was set up which reported that his election was invalid; a Bill was rushed through validating it and indemnifying him from the consequences of acting as an MP while disqualified.

== Political stance ==
Forman was on the left of the Labour Party and was a consistent opponent of conscription and National Service. Over the Suez Canal in 1954, Forman was one of six Labour MPs who voted with the Conservative government to support the dismantling of the British base in Suez; the unofficial leader of this group, Emrys Hughes, declared that he agreed that the base was obsolete in the age of the hydrogen bomb. He was a member of the Parliamentary Temperance Group and in 1957 supported restrictions on access for children to clubs selling alcohol.

== Later career ==
After the 1959 general election, Forman's attendance declined. He was one of the Members of Parliament mentioned on BBC Television's "That Was The Week That Was" on 19 January 1963 as having made no speeches in Parliament since the general election. He retired at the 1964 general election.

== Sources ==
- Leigh Rayment's Historical List of MPs
- M. Stenton and S. Lees, "Who's Who of British MPs" Vol. IV (Harvester Press, 1981)
- Philip Norton, "Dissension in the House of Commons 1945-74" (Macmillan, 1975)

Parliament of the United Kingdom
Preceded by Agnes Hardie	Member of Parliament for Glasgow Springburn; 1945–1964	Succeeded by Richard Buchanan
