= George Hardie (politician) =

Scottish politician

George Downie Blyth Crookston Hardie (8 September 1873 – 26 July 1937) was a Scottish Labour politician, and the younger brother of the party's founder Keir Hardie.

After leaving school, he became an engineer and an activist in the Independent Labour Party.

He first stood for election to the House of Commons at the 1918 general election, when he unsuccessfully contested the Glasgow Springburn constituency for the Labour Party. He won the Springburn seat with a large majority at the 1922 general election, helped by the absence of a Liberal Party candidate. He was re-elected at the next three consecutive general elections, but when Labour's vote collapsed at the 1931 general election, Hardie was one of those who lost his seat – by a narrow majority of only 34 votes, the left-wing vote having been split by the presence of a Communist Party candidate.

Hardie was re-elected with a large majority at the 1935 general election, and died in office two years later, aged 63. He was succeeded by his wife, Agnes Hardie, who became Glasgow's first female MP and the fifth ever Scottish woman to become an MP.

== See also ==
- Agnes Hardie MP

Parliament of the United Kingdom
Preceded by F. A. Macquisten	Member of Parliament for Glasgow Springburn; 1922–1931	Succeeded by Charles Emmott
Preceded by Charles Emmott	Member of Parliament for Glasgow Springburn; 1935–1937	Succeeded by Agnes Hardie
