= 2009 Speaker of the British House of Commons election =

- 22 June 2009
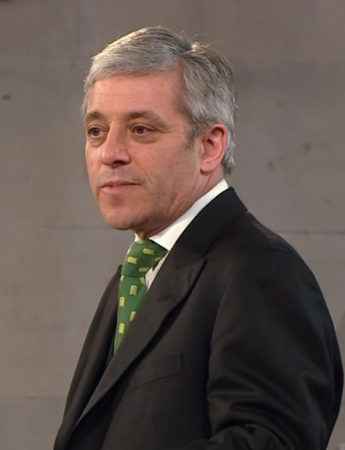

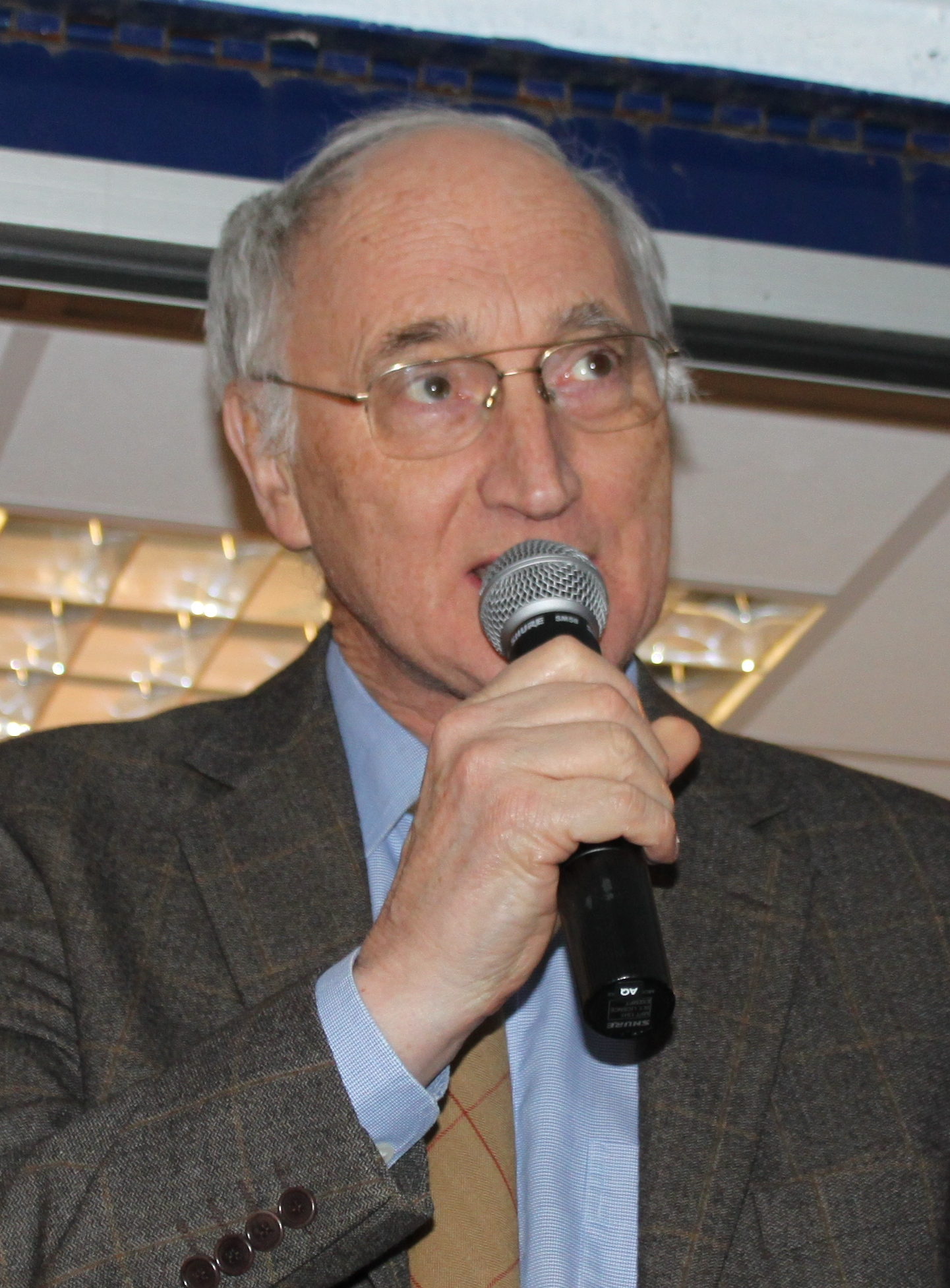

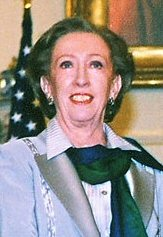

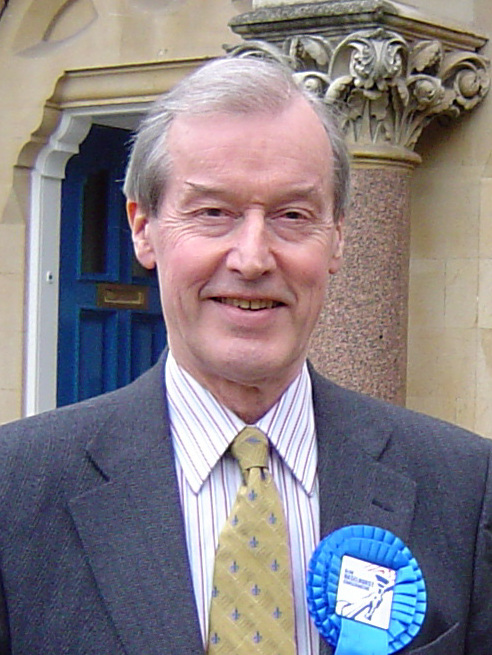

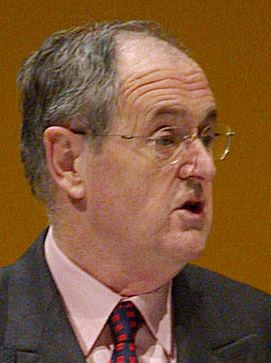

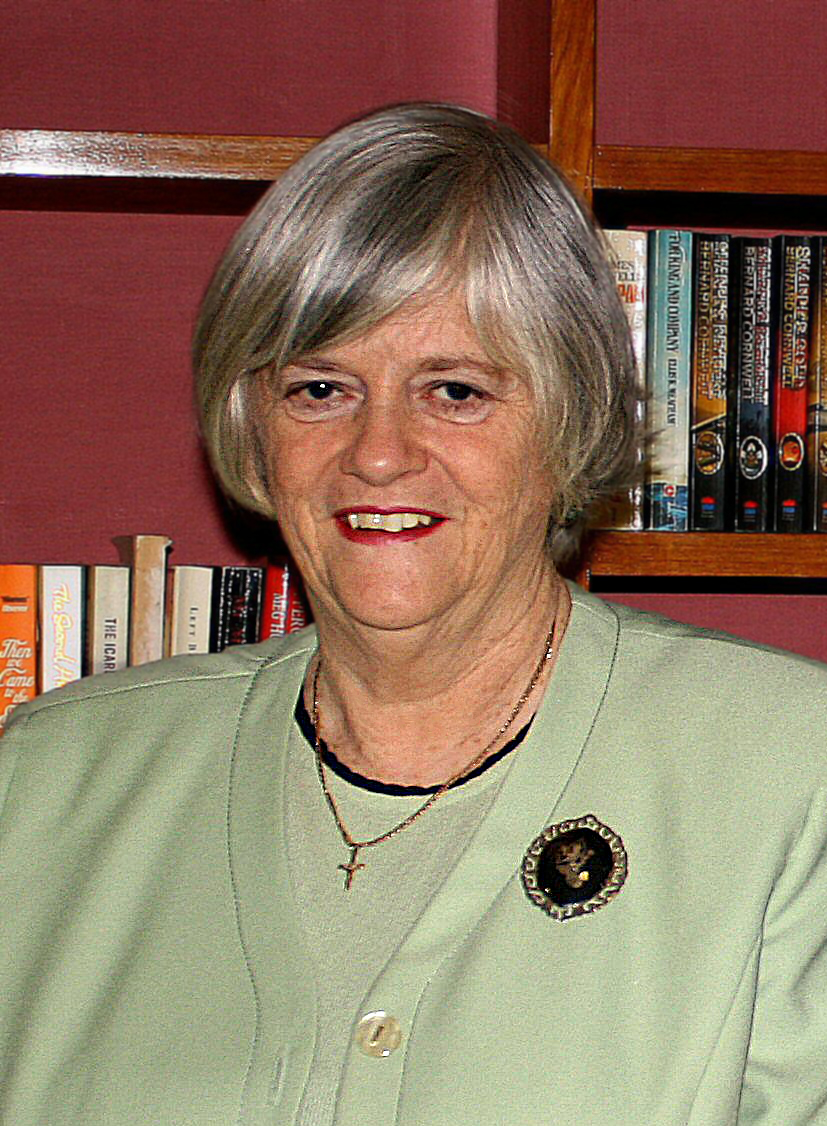
Candidate	John Bercow	Sir George Young	Margaret Beckett
Party	Conservative	Conservative	Labour
Constituency	Buckingham	North West Hampshire	Derby South
First round	179	112	74
Second round	221	174	70
Final round	322	271	Withdrew
Candidate	Alan Haselhurst	Alan Beith	Ann Widdecombe
Party	Conservative	Liberal Democrats	Conservative
Constituency	Saffron Walden	Berwick-upon-Tweed	Maidstone and The Weald
First round	66	55	44
Second round	57	46	30
Final round	Withdrew	Withdrew	Eliminated
Speaker before election
Michael Martin
Labour
Elected Speaker
John Bercow
Conservative

The 2009 election of the Speaker of the House of Commons occurred on 22 June 2009 following the resignation of Michael Martin as Speaker during the parliamentary expenses scandal. Martin was the first Speaker since Sir John Trevor in 1695 to be forced out of office. It was the first Speaker election since 11 May 2005, and the first contested election of a Speaker since 23 October 2000.

Conservative MP John Bercow was elected as the new speaker, after three rounds of voting.

== Rules ==
Voting took place in the House of Commons of the Fifty-Fourth Parliament of the United Kingdom.

Under the new rules for the election of the Speaker, introduced in 2001, candidates needed to be nominated by at least twelve Members of Parliament, at least three of them members of a party different from that of the candidate. Each member was allowed to nominate only one candidate. After the candidates' speeches, the House voted by secret ballot, with an absolute majority required for victory. If no candidate won a majority, then the individual with the fewest votes was eliminated, as were any candidates who received less than five per cent of the votes cast. The House continued to vote until one member received the requisite majority under a voting system known as the exhaustive ballot. Then, the House voted on a formal motion to appoint the member in question to the Speakership. The Father of the House, Alan Williams, was the presiding officer of the Commons during the election process.

The final stage of appointment of a new Speaker is a formality but has constitutional significance. The monarch must signify their approval of the new Speaker, which is done by the appointment of a Royal Commission.

== Candidates ==
=== Announced ===
The following individuals all confirmed their intention to stand for election to the office of Speaker, and were all in turn confirmed as nominated candidates by the Parliamentary authorities on the morning of the election:

- Margaret Beckett (Labour)
- Alan Beith (Liberal Democrat)
- John Bercow (Conservative)
- Patrick Cormack (Conservative)
- Parmjit Dhanda (Labour)
- Alan Haselhurst (Deputy Speaker/Conservative)
- Michael Lord (Deputy Speaker/Conservative)
- Richard Shepherd (Conservative)
- Ann Widdecombe (Conservative)
- Sir George Young (Conservative)

All 10 of the above candidates appeared at a Hansard Society hustings on 15 June. This was the first full hustings to take place for a Speaker election, although there was a hustings for the 2000 speaker election, which several of the candidates did not attend.

=== Withdrew prior to nomination ===
The following candidate withdrew before the election was held:

- Frank Field (Labour) – withdrew citing a lack of support from his own party; endorsed Widdecombe

=== Nominations ===
No official list of MPs who nominated candidates was publicly released. A partial list of nominations is as follows:

- Margaret Beckett – Denis MacShane (Lab), Ann Coffey (Lab), Richard Caborn (Lab), Linda Gilroy (Lab), Lynda Waltho (Lab), Glenda Jackson (Lab), John Battle (Lab), Clive Efford (Lab), Kelvin Hopkins (Lab), Geoffrey Robinson (Lab), Andy Slaughter (Lab), Paul Murphy (Lab), Greg Knight (Con), Angela Browning (Con), Sylvia Hermon (UUP).
- Alan Beith – Alan Whitehead (Lab), Denis Murphy (Lab), Mark Lazarowicz (Lab), Martin Linton (Lab), Fiona McTaggart (Lab), Elfyn Llwyd (Plaid), Vince Cable (LD), Jenny Willott (LD), Michael Moore (LD), Annette Brooke (LD), Chris Huhne (LD), Phil Willis (LD), Roger Williams (LD), Greg Mulholland (LD), Steve Webb (LD).
- John Bercow – Dai Davies (Ind), Charles Walker (Con), Malcolm Bruce (LD), Adam Price (Plaid), Karen Buck (Lab), Sandra Gidley (LD), Julie Morgan (Lab), Natascha Engel (Lab), Peter Kilfoyle (Lab), David Laws (LD), Anne Begg (Lab), Pete Wishart (SNP), Sadiq Khan (Lab), Patricia Hewitt (Lab), Mark Durkan (SDLP).
- Patrick Cormack – Peter Lilley (Con). Four other Conservatives, five from Labour, among others.
- Parmjit Dhanda – Malcolm Wicks (Lab), Alison Seabeck (Lab), David Drew (Lab), Howard Stoate (Lab), John Hemming (LD), among others.
- Sir Alan Haselhurst – John Gummer (Con), Daniel Kawczynski (Con), Michael Fallon (Con), Robert Walter (Con), Oliver Heald (Con), Edward Leigh (Con), Eddie O'Hara (Lab), Harry Cohen (Lab), George Howarth (Lab), Jim Dowd (Lab), Eric Illsley (Lab), Janet Anderson (Lab), John Thurso (LD), Bob Russell (LD).
- Michael Lord – No nominations publicly available.
- Richard Shepherd – No nominations publicly available.
- Ann Widdecombe – Frank Field (Lab), Kim Howells (Lab), John Grogan (Lab), Jim Dobbin (Lab), Nigel Evans (Con), Mark Pritchard (Con), Philip Hollobone (Con), Nadine Dorries (Con), Sammy Wilson (DUP), among others.
- Sir George Young – Chris Mullin (Lab), Tony Wright (Lab), Stephen Pound (Lab), Fabian Hamilton (Lab), Keith Hill (Lab), Richard Ottaway (Con), Gary Streeter (Con), Michael Jack (Con), James Arbuthnot (Con), Nicholas Soames (Con), Michael Ancram (Con), John Butterfill (Con), David Curry (Con), Peter Bottomley (Con), Peter Luff (Con).

== Results ==
The result of the first secret ballot was announced at 17:10 on 22 June 2009, after the nominated candidates had all addressed the House of Commons. The result of the second ballot was announced at approximately 18:55. Following the result of the second ballot, Beckett, Haselhurst and Beith withdrew their candidacies after their support fell, leaving a straight runoff in the third round between two Conservative MPs, John Bercow and George Young. The result of the third ballot was announced around 20:30. Bercow won, with 54% of the final vote.

Candidate	First ballot		Second ballot		Third ballot	
Candidate	Votes	%	Votes	%	Votes	%
John Bercow ✓	179	30.1	221	36.9	322	54.3
Sir George Young	112	18.9	174	29.0	271	45.7
Margaret Beckett	74	12.5	70	11.7	Withdrew	
Alan Haselhurst	66	11.1	57	9.5	Withdrew	
Sir Alan Beith	55	9.3	46	7.7	Withdrew	
Ann Widdecombe	44	7.4	30	5.0	Eliminated	
Parmjit Dhanda	26	4.4	Eliminated			
Richard Shepherd	15	2.5	Eliminated			
Patrick Cormack	13	2.2	Eliminated			
Michael Lord	9	1.5	Eliminated			
Spoilt/rejected ballots	1 (Note: Labour MP John Mann said he had spoilt his ballot due to the candidates being "dismal")	0.2	1	0.2	0	0
Turnout (Note: At the time of the election, the full house had 646 seats. Two of these were vacant, five Sinn Féin MPs do not take their seats, and Alan Williams was not eligible to vote. Turnout is thus based on 638 possible voters.)	594	93.1	599	93.9	593	92.9

Following the final vote, the question was put "That John Bercow do take the Chair of this House as Speaker", which was carried without any audible opposition. After this, Bercow was dragged to the Chair (as per House custom) by Charles Walker and Sandra Gidley, and gave an inaugural speech as Speaker-Elect.

Later that evening, Bercow was formally appointed Speaker by receiving the Queen's approbation through a Royal Commission in the House of Lords.

== See also ==
- 2009 Glasgow North East by-election
