= Richard Buchanan (politician) =

British politician

Richard Buchanan (3 May 1912 – 22 January 2003) was a British Labour politician.

Buchanan was educated at St Mungo's Academy. He worked as an engineer and toolfitter at the Cowlairs railway works in Springburn and was a councillor on Glasgow Corporation from 1949. He joined the National Union of Railwaymen in 1928, and in later years was secretary of its political committee, in addition to being president of the Scottish Library Association.

Buchanan was the Member of Parliament for Glasgow Springburn from 1964 to 1979, preceding Michael Martin. In 1981, two years after leaving Parliament, he was one of 13 former Labour MPs whose name featured publicly in support of the Limehouse Declaration, which announced the formation of the breakaway Social Democratic Party (SDP).

== Sources ==
- Times Guide to the House of Commons October 1974
- Leigh Rayment's Historical List of MPs

Parliament of the United Kingdom
Preceded by John Forman	Member of Parliament for Glasgow Springburn; 1964 – 1979	Succeeded by Michael Martin
