= Agnes Hardie =

British politician

Agnes Hardie CBE

Member of Parliament for Glasgow Springburn
- In office 7 September 1937 – 4 July 1945
- Prime Minister: Stanley Baldwin
- Preceded by: George Hardie
- Succeeded by: John Forman

Personal details
- Born: Agnes Agnew Pettigrew; 6 September 1874
- Died: 24 March 1951 (aged 76)
- Party: Labour
- Spouse: George Hardie
- Relatives: Keir Hardie (brother-in-law)

Agnes Agnew Hardie (née Pettigrew; 6 September 1874 – 24 March 1951) was a British Labour politician.

== Early life ==
Her association with the Labour movement began when she was a shop girl in Glasgow. She was a pioneer member of the Shop Assistants' Union, acting for some years as organizer. During the First World War she was a woman's organizer of the Labour Party and was a member of the then Glasgow Education Authority. She married George Hardie, who was a member of parliament (MP) and brother of Keir Hardie. After an early career in the National Union of Shop Assistants, she was the Women's Organizer for the Labour Party in Scotland from 1918 to 1923.

== Career ==
At the Glasgow Springburn by-election in 1937 caused by the death of her husband, she was elected as member of parliament (MP) for Glasgow Springburn, and held the seat until her retirement at the 1945 general election. On her election she was Glasgow's first female MP, the fifth female MP ever to be elected in Scotland and the second Scottish Labour MP, after Jennie Lee.

== See also ==
- George Hardie MP

Parliament of the United Kingdom
| Preceded by George Hardie | Member of Parliament for Glasgow Springburn; 1937 – 1945 | Succeeded by John Forman |
Party political offices
| Preceded by New position | Labour Party Scottish Women's Organiser; 1918–1923 | Succeeded by Mary Sutherland |
