= 1937 Glasgow Springburn by-election =

UK parliament by-election

The 1937 Glasgow Springburn by-election occurred in Glasgow Springburn on 7 September 1937, which (unusually for a UK election) was a Tuesday.

It was caused by the death of George Hardie of Labour. It was won by his widow Agnes Hardie for Labour.

== Campaign ==
The main issue of discussion related not to local concerns, but national concerns of rearmament. There had been much debate within the Labour Movement, including the Labour Party and the Trades Union Congress, about the National Government's reaction to the emerging situation in Europe. This led eventually to a commitment not to reverse the rearmament program until the international situation had changed. The Conservative candidate, Colonel McInnes Shaw, was unable to speak at all for eight days during the campaign due to a throat illness and Mrs. Hardie gave only a brief address (with no questions) at an eve-of-poll address.

== Result ==
Glasgow Springburn by-election, 1937
Party	Candidate	Votes	%	±%
Labour	Agnes Hardie	14,859	62.6	−0.5
Conservative	McInnes Shaw	8,881	37.4	+0.5
Majority		5,978	25.2	−1.0
Turnout		23,740	50.9	−20.2
Labour hold		Swing	-0.5	

== See also ==
- Glasgow Springburn (UK Parliament constituency)
- List of United Kingdom by-elections (1931–1950)
- George Hardie MP
- Agnes Hardie MP
