= Michael Martin, Baron Martin of Springburn =

British politician (1945–2018)

The Right Honourable The Lord Martin of Springburn PC
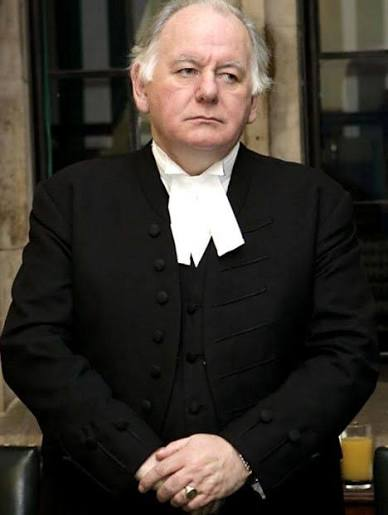
- Martin in 2003

Speaker of the House of Commons of the United Kingdom
- In office 23 October 2000 – 21 June 2009
- Monarch: Elizabeth II
- Prime Minister: Tony Blair; Gordon Brown
- Preceded by: Betty Boothroyd
- Succeeded by: John Bercow

Deputy Speaker of the House of Commons First Deputy Chairman of Ways and Means
- In office 14 May 1997 – 23 October 2000
- Speaker: Betty Boothroyd
- Preceded by: Geoffrey Lofthouse
- Succeeded by: Sylvia Heal

Member of the House of Lords
- Lord Temporal
- Life peerage 25 August 2009 – 29 April 2018

Member of Parliament for Glasgow North East Glasgow Springburn (1979–2005)
- In office 3 May 1979 – 22 June 2009
- Preceded by: Richard Buchanan
- Succeeded by: Willie Bain

Personal details
- Born: Michael John Martin; 3 July 1945 Glasgow, Scotland
- Died: 29 April 2018 (aged 72) Glasgow, Scotland
- Party: Crossbench (2009–2018)
- Other political affiliations: Speaker (2000–2009); Labour (1966–2000)
- Spouse: Mary McLay (m. 1966)
- Children: 2 (including Paul)

Michael John Martin, Baron Martin of Springburn, PC (3 July 1945 – 29 April 2018) was a Scottish politician who served as Speaker of the House of Commons between 2000 and 2009. A member of the Labour Party prior to becoming speaker, he was the Member of Parliament (MP) for Glasgow Springburn from 1979 to 2005 and for Glasgow North East until 2009. He was elected as Speaker of the House of Commons in 2000, remaining in the office for nine years until his involuntary resignation in 2009.

On his election to the post of Speaker in 2000, he was the first Catholic to serve in the role since the Reformation. He resigned from the position on 21 June 2009, as a result of diminishing parliamentary and public confidence owing to his role in the expenses scandal. He stood down from the House of Commons on the following day.

== Early life ==
Martin was born on 3 July 1945 in William Street in Glasgow, the son of a merchant seaman and a school cleaner. He was one of five children, and was brought up in a tenement community in Anderston. The family later moved to Springburn when Michael was fourteen years old. He attended St Patrick's Boys' School, leaving a few days before his fifteenth birthday to become an apprentice sheet metal worker at a factory called Heatovent. He worked at a railway yard in Springburn for the train engine makers North British Caledonian Railways and became involved in the National Union of Sheet Metal Workers and Coppersmiths. He joined the Labour Party when aged 21. He worked as a sheet-metal worker with Rolls-Royce from 1960 to 1976, and worked at the plant at Hillington. By his mid-twenties, he was a full-time shop steward with the Amalgamated Union of Engineering Workers.

At the age of 27, in 1973, Martin was elected as a Labour councillor of the Glasgow Corporation, representing the Fairfield ward in the Govan area. In 1974, he was elected to the City of Glasgow District Council, representing the Balornock ward. He was a trade union organiser with the National Union of Public Employees (NUPE) between 1976 and 1979.

== Early parliamentary career ==
In 1978, Martin was selected by the Labour Party out of five prospective candidates to replace Richard Buchanan. He was elected as the Member of Parliament for Glasgow Springburn at the 1979 general election. He was a supporter of Roy Hattersley and Denis Healey, who were ideologically on the right wing of the party and with whom he served as a parliamentary private secretary from 1980 to 1983. He was re-elected in 1983, 1987, 1992 and 1997. Associated with the right wing of the Labour Party, he was socially conservative on issues such as abortion and homosexuality. In 1994, he was one of thirteen Labour MPs who voted against the reduction of the age of consent for homosexuals from 21 to 18.

He served as Chairman of the Scottish Grand Committee from 1987 to 1997. He sat on the Speaker's Panel of Chairmen 1987–2000. He was appointed as First Deputy Chairman of Ways and Means (one of three Deputy Speakers) in May 1997.

== Speakership ==
In 2000, Betty Boothroyd retired as Speaker. An election was held in October of that year and twelve MPs put their names forward as potential successors. Many observers had considered the Conservative MP George Young to be the favourite as he had support from both the Conservative and Labour leadership, who viewed it as the Conservatives' 'turn' to have a Speaker elected from their benches. However, many backbench MPs, particularly those from the Labour Party (who held a large majority in the House at the time), viewed Young as being not sufficiently in touch with ordinary MPs because he had very recently been a member of his party's front bench team. (Young had stepped down from the Shadow Cabinet just before the election for a new Speaker and had been a member of the Cabinet in the Conservative government during the previous parliament.) In the end, the contest was determined by a series of votes that were held during a process that lasted more than six hours on 23 October 2000. Martin's rivals were eliminated one by one and Young's candidacy was rejected by the House.

Martin was elected as the 156th Speaker on 23 October 2000, becoming the first Catholic to serve in the role since the Reformation. In accordance with a long-standing convention, Martin resigned from the Labour Party. He eschewed some of the traditional clothing associated with the Speaker's role, appearing without wig, silk stockings and knee breeches. His Glaswegian accent led to his being nicknamed "Gorbals Mick" by Quentin Letts, after the working-class district of Glasgow, although he was actually born on the other side of the river from the Gorbals and represented a constituency a few miles away.

Martin's initial appointment as Speaker occurred against a recent pattern in the House where the post of Speaker had alternated between the two main political parties (the Conservative Party and the Labour Party). As his predecessor, Betty Boothroyd, had been a Labour MP, the new Speaker had been expected to emerge from the Conservative benches.

Martin was re-elected as an MP in the 2001 general election, with the Conservatives and Liberal Democrats not challenging him but the Scottish National Party (SNP) achieving a small swing towards its candidate. After being returned in the general election, he did not face a contest for the chair—no previous speakers that were returned to the Commons after a general election have. He was re-elected as Speaker, with Young nominating him.

Although the House of Commons has long held a yearly hannukiah lighting ceremony at the official residence of the Speaker, it never had its own hannukiah and had to borrow one from the local Jewish community every year; despite being a Catholic, Martin arranged in 2003 for the House to have its own hannukiah, which is still used every year. Coincidentally, his successor John Bercow would become the first Jewish Speaker of the House six years later.

In the 2005 general election, he stood in the new constituency of Glasgow North East, with the SNP again fielding a candidate against him. He was returned to Parliament. He was unopposed in the election to be Speaker. Shortly after the 2005 election, when the Liberal Democrat MP Patsy Calton entered the Commons for the last time to affirm her allegiance from a wheelchair and sign the register, Martin broke with tradition and left the Speaker's Chair to shake her hand and kiss her on the cheek, saying "Welcome home Patsy." Calton, who had just been re-elected, had terminal breast cancer and died three days later.

On 17 February 2006, Martin had angioplasty at the Glasgow Royal Infirmary for blocked coronary arteries. His office confirmed this on 26 February and indicated that he would be absent from his duties for several weeks. He returned to the chair on 18 April.

=== Prime Minister's Questions ===
On 1 November 2006, during Prime Minister's Questions, Martin caused uproar in the House of Commons by ruling out of order a question from Opposition Leader David Cameron in which he challenged Prime Minister Tony Blair over the future leadership of the Labour Party. Martin stated that the purpose of Prime Minister's Questions was for the House to question the Prime Minister on the actions of the government. This caused such dissent amongst MPs that Martin threatened to suspend the session. Cameron re-worded the question to ask about Blair's future as prime minister rather than leader of the Labour Party, which Martin allowed. Conservative MPs threatened to walk out if a similar event occurred in the future.

=== Personal expenses ===
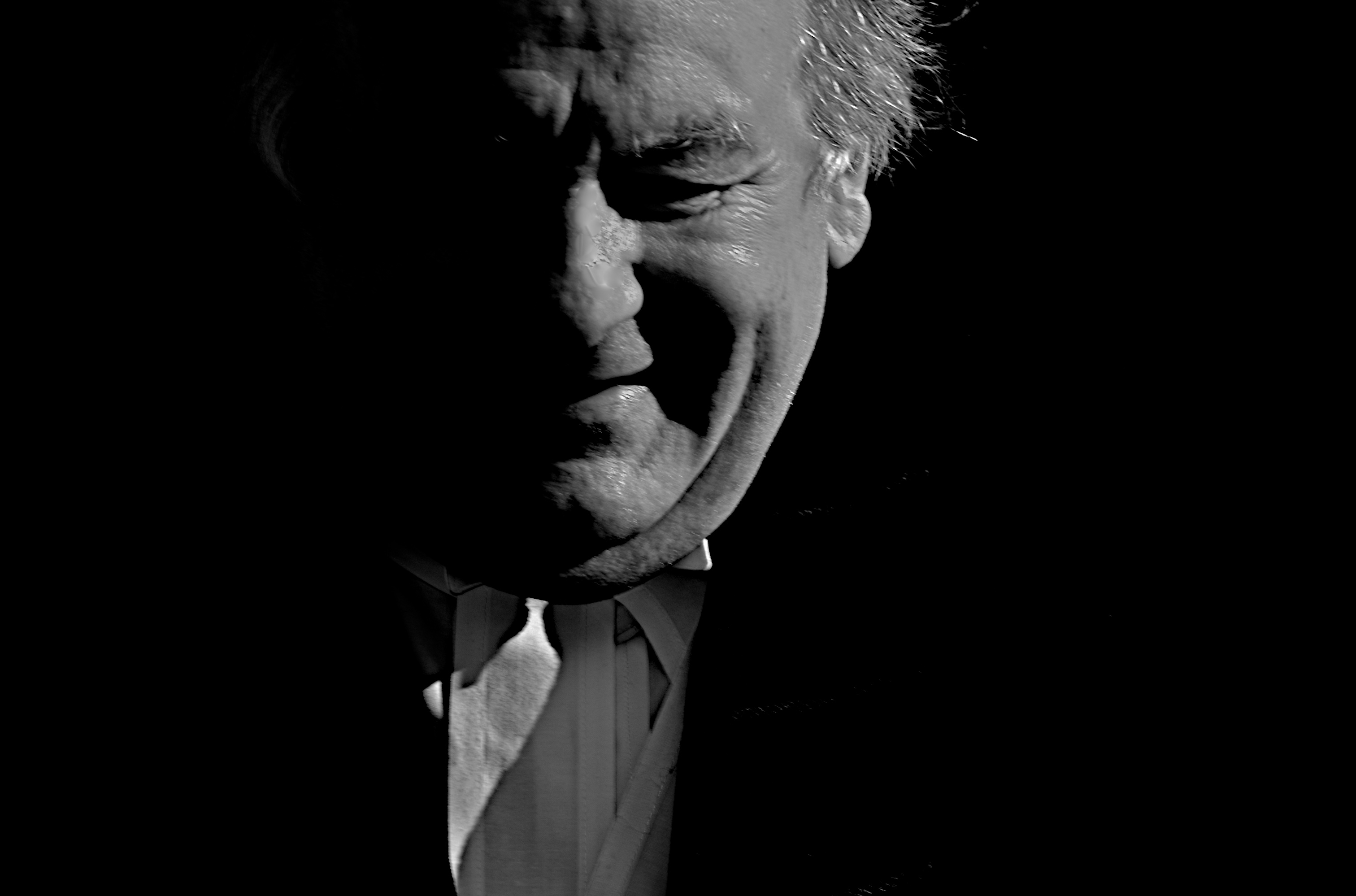
Martin in 2007

In 2007, Martin used public money to employ lawyers in challenging negative press stories; media law firm Carter-Ruck was engaged for three months at a cost of more than £20,000. The Liberal Democrat MP Norman Baker criticised the use of taxpayers' money as a "very expensive" way to issue press releases; the TaxPayers' Alliance also expressed disapproval. Martin was also criticised at the same time for trying to block the publication of details of MPs' £5 million-a-year travel expenses under the Freedom of Information Act.

On 24 February 2008, John Lyon, the Parliamentary Commissioner for Standards, was asked by the Taxpayers' Alliance to investigate whether Martin had abused parliamentary expenses and allowances. Lyon was obliged to examine all such complaints although the Commissioner could have ruled that the complaint was unfounded. This followed a week in which Martin's spokesman, the veteran Whitehall communications chief Mike Granatt of PR agency Luther Pendragon, resigned after admitting that he had unwittingly misled The Mail on Sunday over more than £4,000 in taxi expenses incurred by the Speaker's wife, Mary Martin. Granatt blamed unnamed officials, but not the Speaker, for falsely informing him that the expenses were legitimate because Martin's wife had been accompanied by an official on shopping trips to buy food for receptions. In fact, her housekeeper had accompanied her; catering for such receptions is the responsibility of the parliamentary caterers.

On 29 March 2008, The Daily Telegraph revealed that refurbishment of Michael Martin's official residence, Speaker's House, had amounted to £1.7 million over seven years. The house is inside the Palace of Westminster. On 14 May 2009, The Daily Telegraph reported that Martin had claimed £1,400 for using chauffeur-driven cars that included visits to Celtic Park, home of Celtic Football Club, and his local Job Centre.

=== Damian Green affair ===
In November 2008, Conservative immigration spokesman Damian Green was arrested, in connection with a police investigation into alleged leaks from the Home Office. The MP was detained for nine hours, and his homes and office in the House of Commons office were searched. Green was never charged with any crime. The raid on Commons premises angered many MPs, who viewed it as infringement on the democratic prerogatives of parliament.

Martin's spokesperson was asked if he had approved the Metropolitan Police searching Green's Commons office without a search warrant, and replied: "There is a process to be followed and that was followed." When Parliament reconvened a few days later, Martin read a statement to MPs, stating that "I have been told that the police did not explain, as they are required to do, that (House serjeant at arms Jill Pay) was not obliged to consent or that a warrant could have been insisted on." Martin also said that Pay had given consent for the search without consulting the clerk of the house. The Metropolitan Police questioned Martin's account of events, writing in a letter to Home Secretary Jacqui Smith that police "explained the nature of the investigation and the purpose of the search" to Pay "and were satisfied that the serjeant at arms understood that police had no power to search in the absence of a warrant and therefore could only do so with her written consent or that of the Speaker."

Martin later testified that Pay had informed him of the police plans to raid a Commons office and arrest an MP, but was told that the arrest was related to terrorism. In a subsequent statement to a Commons committee investigating the incident, Martin said Pay failed to tell him that the search was being conducted on the basis of a consent form she had signed, rather than on the basis of a search warrant. Martin criticised Pay's actions and those of the Commons clerk, Malcolm Jack, related to the affair. A report on the investigation, published in 2010, criticized Martin, writing that as speaker he "failed to exercise the ultimate responsibility, which was his alone, to take control and not merely expect to be informed" and that he "should have been asking the right questions and ... should have taken more responsibility for exercising the authority of his high office." The report also criticized "failings" by multiple parties, including other Commons officials, civil servants, and the police, determining that they had made a "quite unnecessary" and "poorly executed" arrest of Green.

=== Declaration of British Council expenses ===
In 2009, Martin was involved in a row over expenses incurred by MPs on taxpayer-funded British Council trips. In 2008 Conservative MP Mark Lancaster flew business class to Bangkok with the British Council for a two-day conference, at a cost of £5,018. Labour MP Sally Keeble flew out economy class and returned business class at a cost of £2,452. MPs must normally declare any hospitality they receive from outside organisations, and the British Council does not appear on a list of bodies whose gifts are exempt from the requirement. Martin signed a special certificate preventing the release of information about these trips, citing "Parliamentary privilege". This occurred during extensive revelations about MPs expenses.

=== Resignation ===
On 12 May 2009, the BBC reported that Michael Martin was under pressure to resign. On 17 May, Liberal Democrat leader Nick Clegg said that Michael Martin should stand down, saying he had become an obstacle to much-needed reform of Parliament. On 19 May, Douglas Carswell tabled a motion of no confidence, which 22 MPs signed. Later that day, Martin announced his intention to resign effective as of 21 June 2009. If the motion had been successful in a vote, Martin would have been the first Speaker to be forced out of office by a motion of no confidence since John Trevor in 1695. Martin said of his decision to resign:

Since I came to this House 30 years ago, I have always felt that the House is at its best when it is united. In order that unity can be maintained, I have decided that I will relinquish the office of Speaker on Sunday 21 June. This will allow the House to proceed to elect a new Speaker on Monday 22 June. That is all I have to say on this matter.

He was made the Steward and Bailiff of the Manor of Northstead to be able to stand down as an MP on the same date, (Note: Members of Parliament are not at liberty to resign their seats because they are given a trust to represent their constituencies; however, taking an "office of profit under the Crown" such as the stewardship of the Manor of Northstead disqualifies an individual from sitting in the House of Commons, and as such is often used by MPs to effectively resign their seats.) forcing a by-election in his constituency of Glasgow North East. An election for Speaker was held on 22 June, which was won by John Bercow.

Speakers are normally elevated to the House of Lords when they retire, and the government said it considered this a "formality". A vetting panel for the House of Lords pointed out to Prime Minister Gordon Brown that nominees had to "enhance rather than diminish" the standing of the house, which some Labour MPs interpreted as a slur against Martin. Sixteen MPs signed a Commons motion requesting that the peer responsible, Lord Jay, withdraw his comment. In accordance with tradition, as soon as Martin's successor as Speaker was installed, the first motion passed by the House of Commons was a resolution directing that a humble address be presented to the Queen, asking her "to confer some signal mark of Her Royal favour" (i.e., a peerage) upon Martin "for his eminent services during the important period in which he presided with such distinguished ability and dignity in the Chair of this House".

== Life peerage and death ==
Martin was made a life peer on 25 August 2009 as Baron Martin of Springburn, of Port Dundas in the City of Glasgow. He was introduced in the House of Lords on 13 October 2009. Like previous Speakers elevated to the Lords, he sat as a Crossbench peer.

Martin took a leave of absence from the House of Lords on 13 September 2017. Following a short illness, he died on 29 April 2018. Tributes were paid by current and former politicians, including then Labour leader Jeremy Corbyn, Martin's successor John Bercow, and former Prime Minister Gordon Brown.

== Arms ==
Coat of arms of Michael Martin, Baron Martin of Springburn
| Crest A kestrel wings surgeant-tergiant Proper. Escutcheon Per chevron Gules and Sable, on a chevron Argent between in chief a martin volant Or between dexter a locomotive wheel partially covered by a cowling and sinister a salmon hauriant with a signet ring in its mouth both Proper and in base a lymphad of the Third flagged Gules sail chequy Azure and Argent, a crescent Sable between an engineer's steel footrule and a chanter both Proper. Motto Tha Mi A’s Stri A Bhi Cothromach (I Strive To Be Fair) |

== Family and personal life ==
Martin met Mary McLay at the Heatovent factory, where she worked as an assembly worker, and they got married in 1966. The couple had a son and a daughter. His son Paul Martin was the Labour Member of the Scottish Parliament (MSP) for Glasgow Springburn from 1999 to 2011, then for the Glasgow Provan constituency from 2011 until his defeat at the 2016 Scottish election.

Martin was a keen player of the bagpipes, having regularly played for guests during his annually hosted Burns night supper. In the run-up to a St Andrew's Day reception on the parliamentary estate, Martin is reported to have once made a special intervention on behalf of the SNP group in the run-up to a Saint Andrew's Day reception, overruling the decision of the Serjeant at Arms to allow bagpipes to be played on the parliamentary estate.

== Notes ==
Parliament of the United Kingdom
| Preceded by Richard Buchanan | Member of Parliament for Glasgow Springburn; 1979–2005 | Constituency abolished |
| New constituency | Member of Parliament for Glasgow North East; 2005–2009 | Succeeded by Willie Bain |
| Preceded by Geoffrey Lofthouse | First Deputy Chairman of Ways and Means; 1997–2000 | Succeeded by Sylvia Heal |
| Preceded by Betty Boothroyd | Speaker of the House of Commons of the United Kingdom; 2000–2009 | Succeeded by John Bercow |
