= 2000 Speaker of the British House of Commons election =

- 23 October 2000
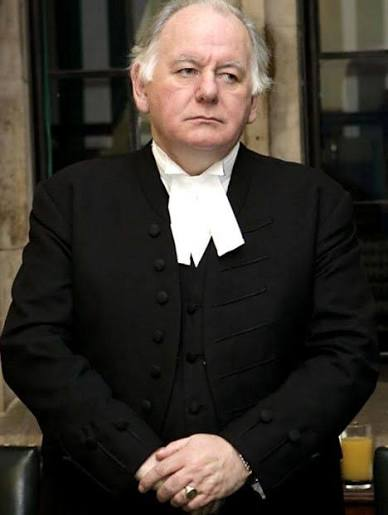
| Candidate | Michael Martin |
| Party | Labour |
| Constituency | Glasgow Springburn |
| Final round | 370 |
| Percentage | 97.9% |
Speaker before election
Betty Boothroyd
Labour
Elected Speaker
Michael Martin
Labour

The 2000 election of the Speaker of the House of Commons occurred on 23 October 2000 following the retirement of Betty Boothroyd as Speaker. The election resulted in the election of Labour MP Michael Martin, who had served as Deputy Speaker since 1997. It was the first contested election since 27 April 1992.

== Candidates ==
=== Nominated candidates ===
The following candidates were successfully nominated and called in the following order, which was decided at the 'discretion' of Edward Heath the chair of the session:

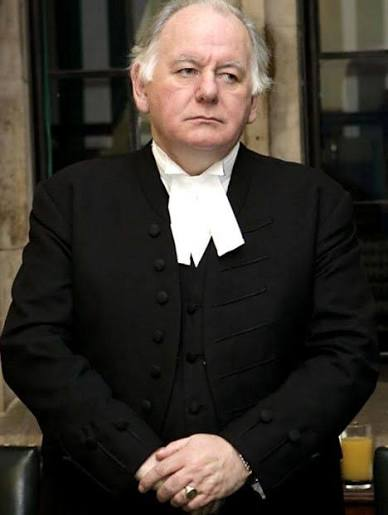
Michael Martin (Labour, Glasgow Springburn): nominated by Peter Snape and seconded by Ann Keen

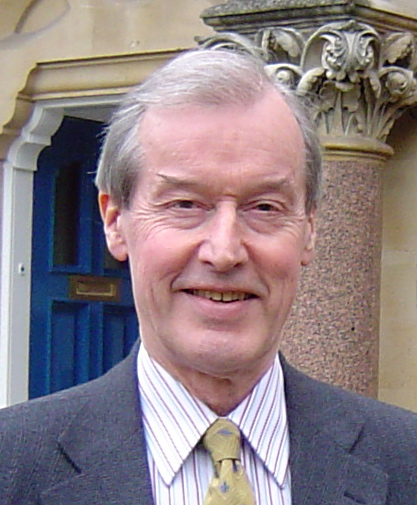
Sir Alan Haselhurst (Conservative, Saffron Walden): nominated by David Winnick and seconded by Peter Brooke

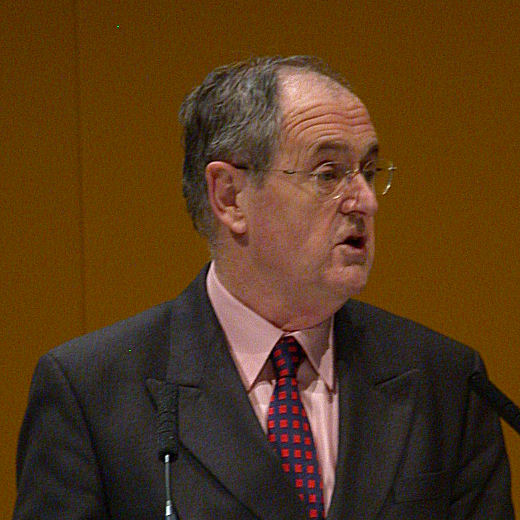
Alan Beith (Liberal Democrats, Berwick-upon-Tweed), nominated by Dafydd Wigley and seconded by Jackie Ballard

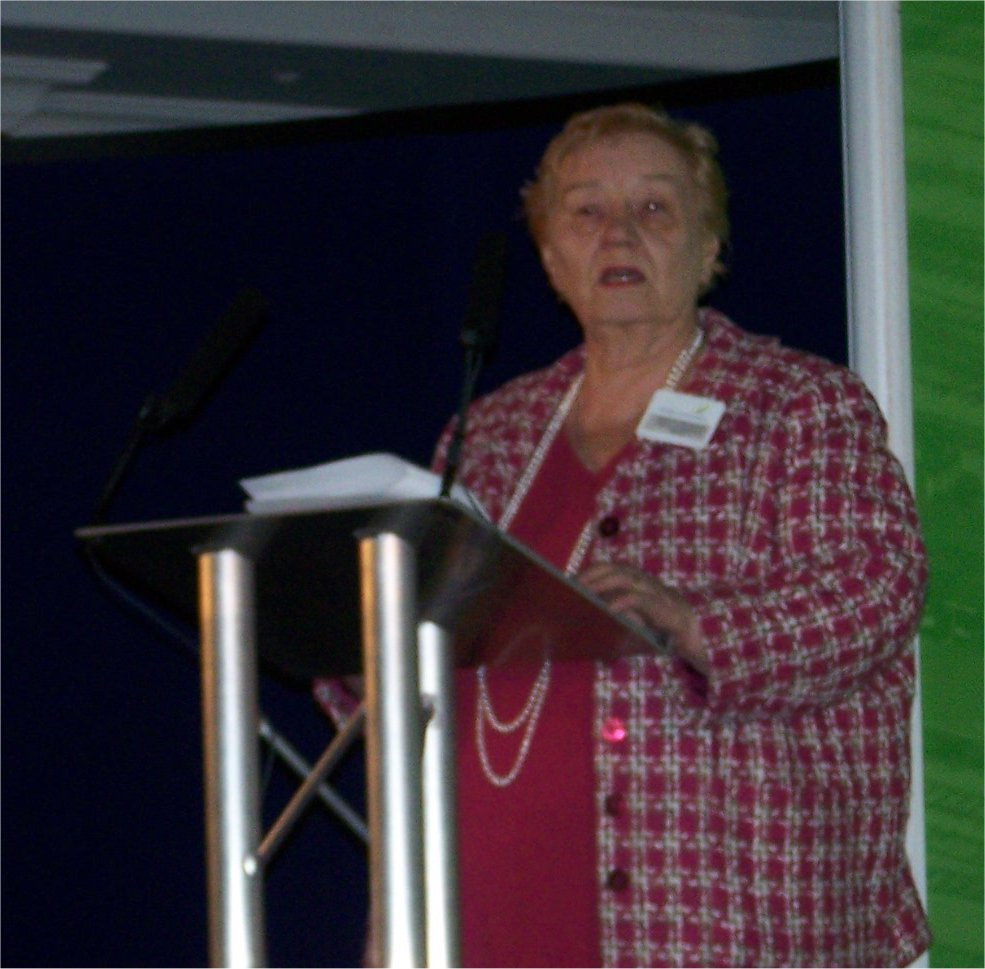
Gwyneth Dunwoody (Labour, Crewe and Nantwich): nominated by David Davis and seconded by Marjorie Mowlam

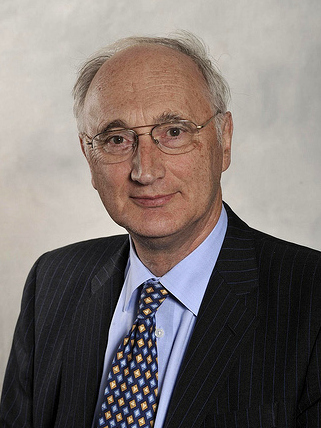
Sir George Young (Conservative, North West Hampshire): nominated by John MacGregor and seconded by Helen Jackson

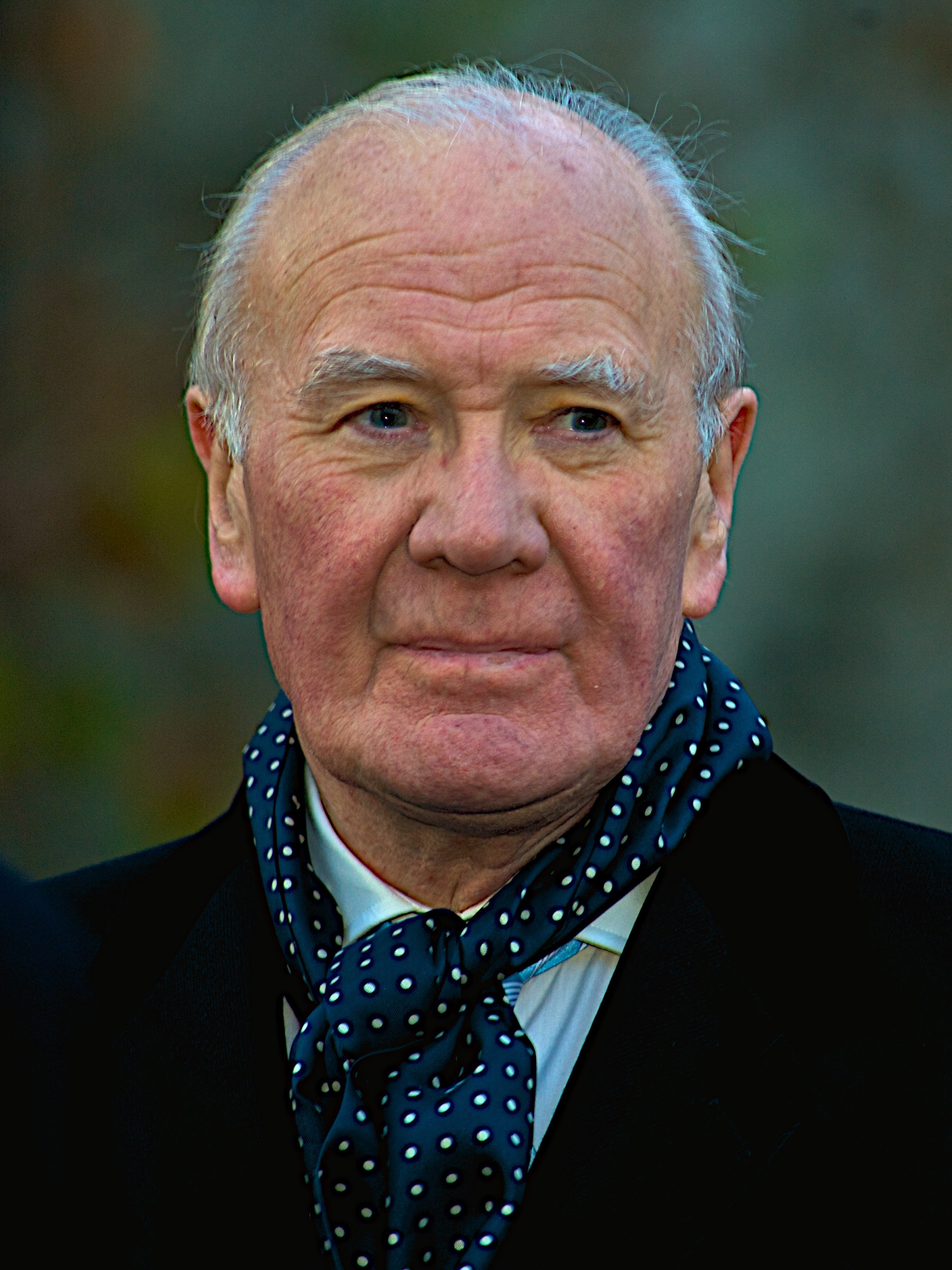
Menzies Campbell (Liberal Democrats, North East Fife): nominated by Martin O'Neill and seconded by Derek Wyatt

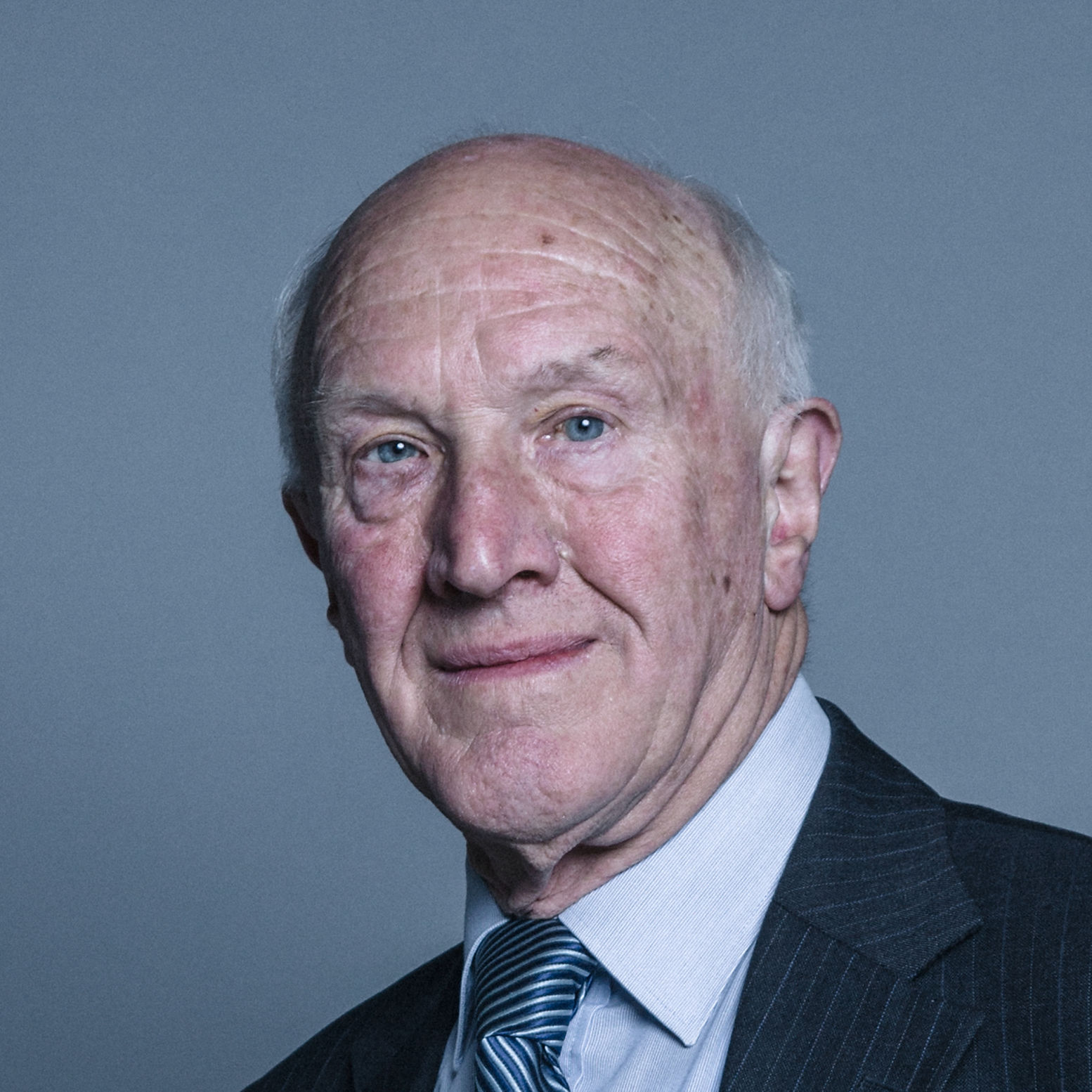
David Clark (Labour, South Shields): nominated by John Maxton and seconded by Joan Ruddock

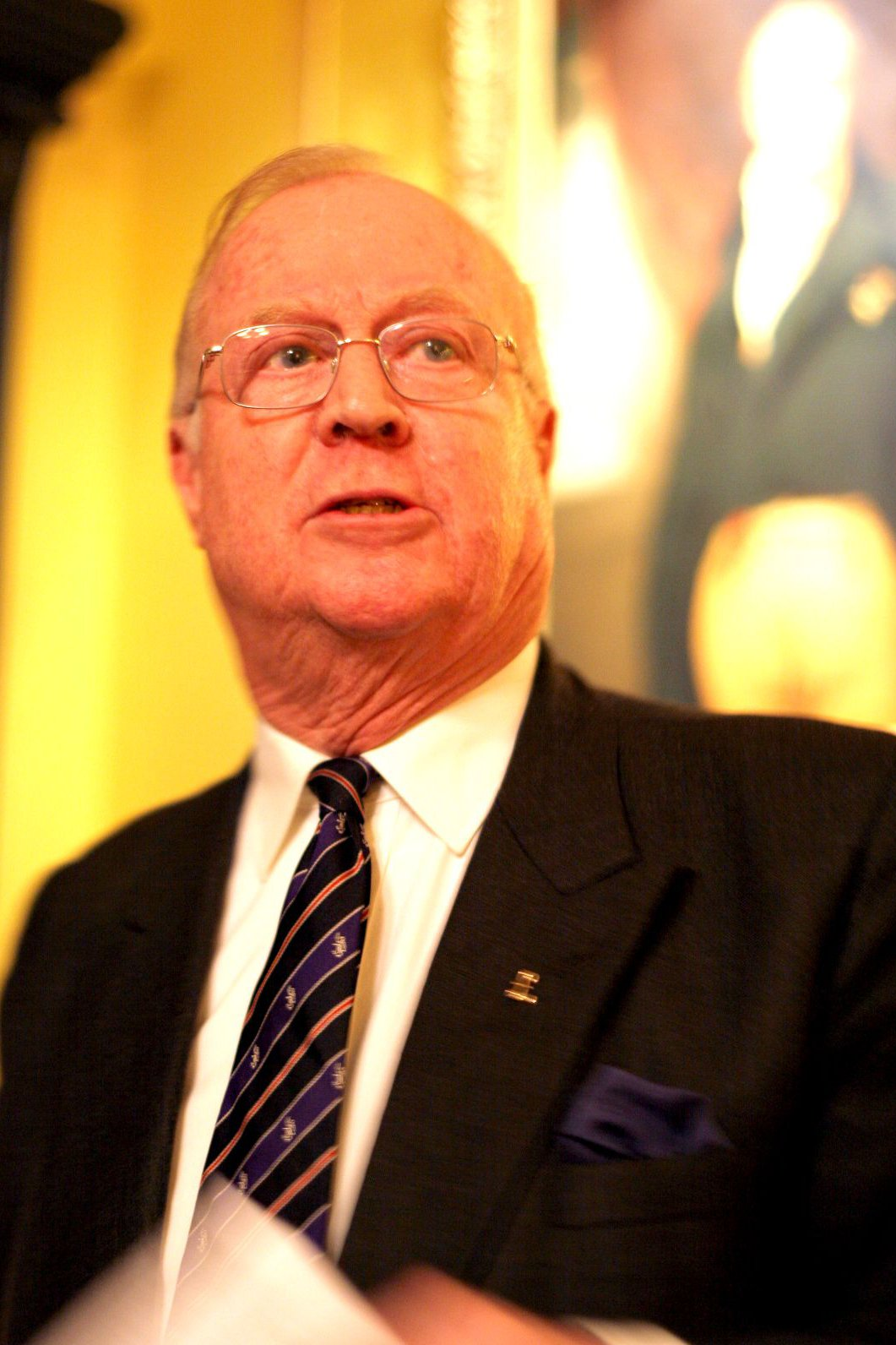
Nicholas Winterton (Conservative, Macclesfield): nominated by John Wilkinson and seconded by Stephen Pound

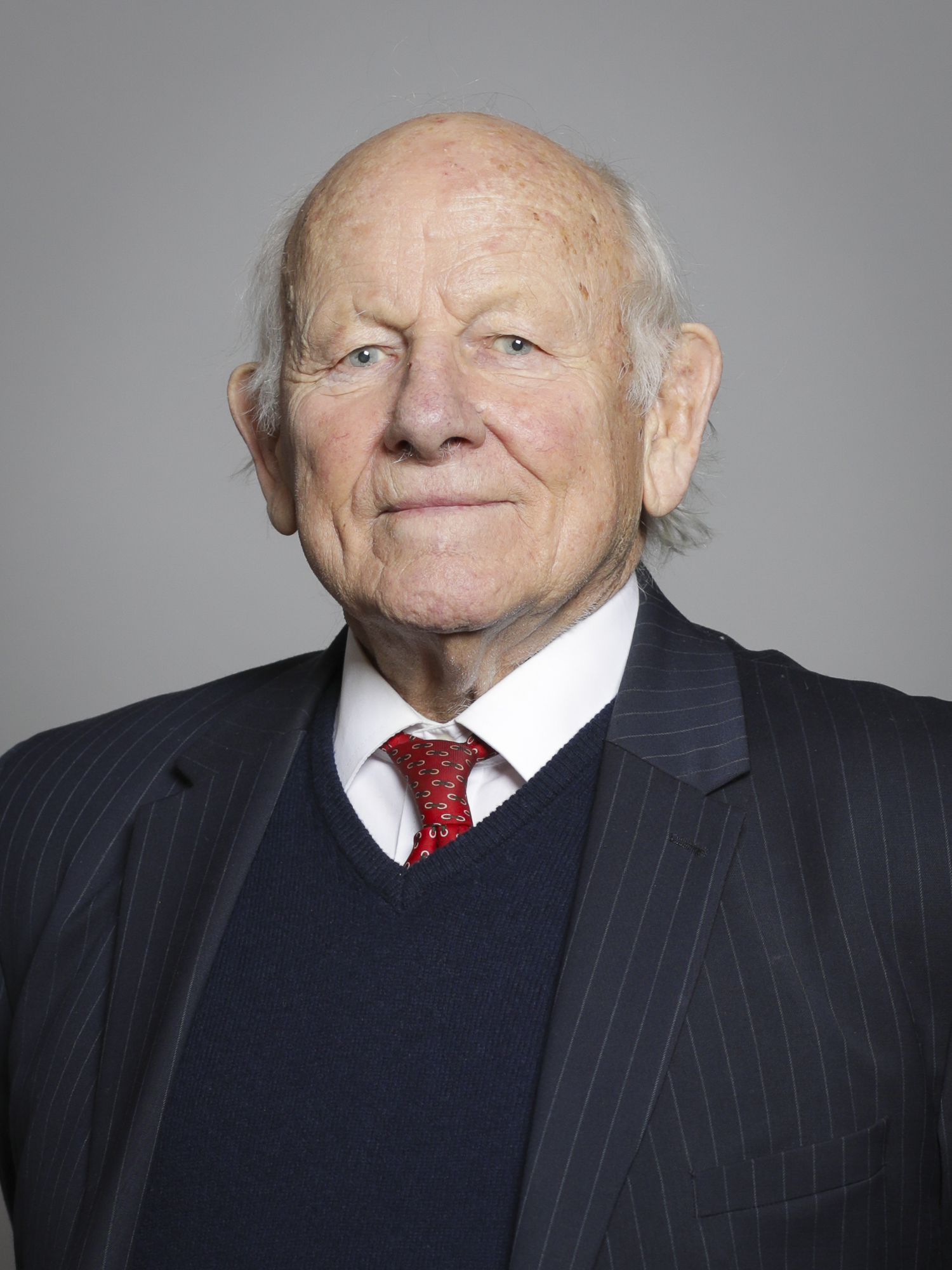
Michael Lord (Conservative, Central Suffolk and North Ipswich): nominated by Tom King and seconded by Andrew Reed

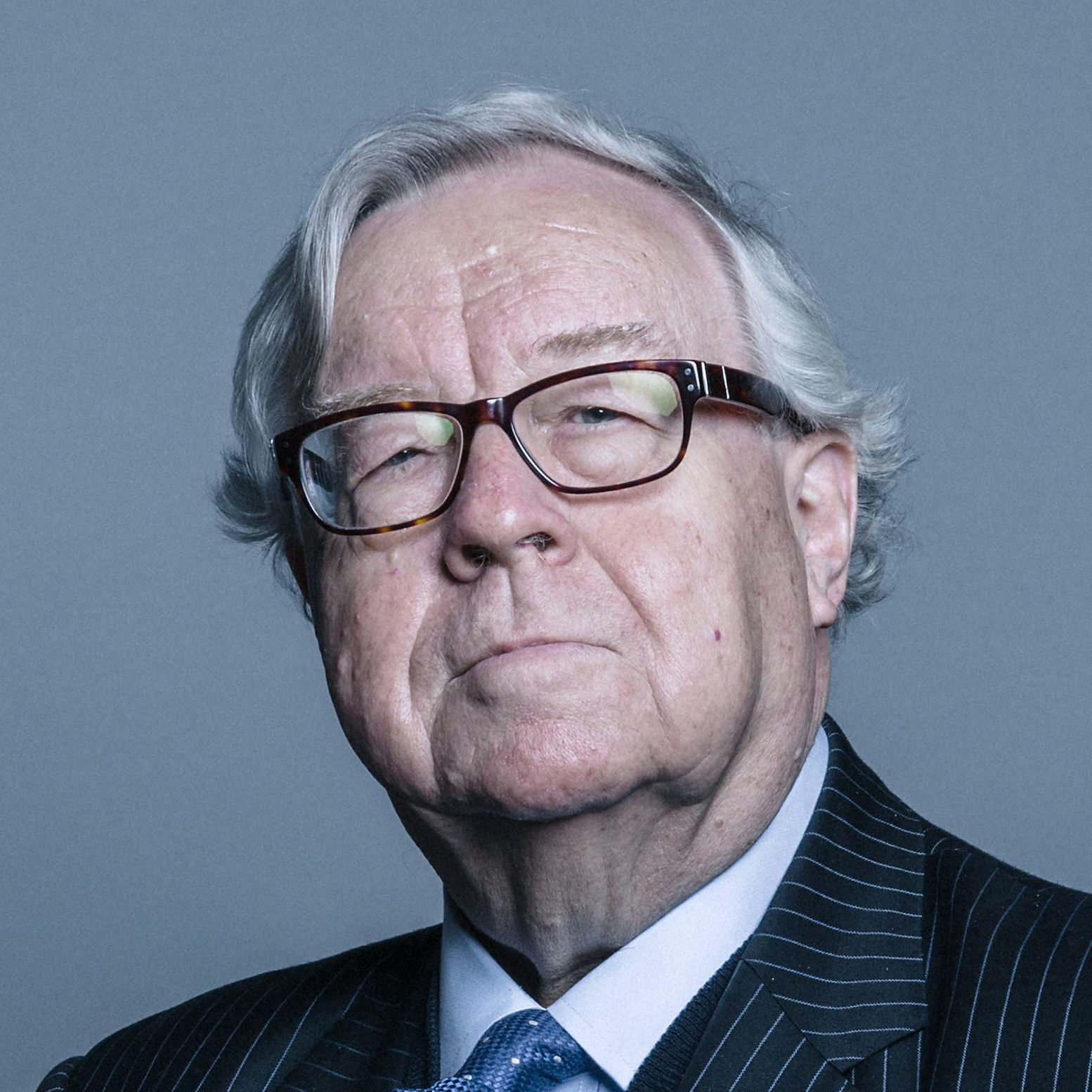
Sir Patrick Cormack (Conservative, South Staffordshire): nominated by Gillian Shephard and seconded by Tam Dalyell

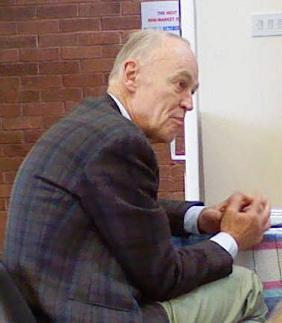
Richard Shepherd (Conservative, Aldridge-Brownhills): nominated by Martin Bell and seconded by Tony Wright

=== Candidate who withdrew ===
- John Butterfill (Conservative, Bournemouth West)

== Election ==
This was the last Speaker's election to be conducted by means of a conventional parliamentary motion with recorded votes on an amendment for each candidate. With an unusually large number of candidates, a significant number of MPs spoke in favour of switching to a less time-consuming procedure, but Sir Edward Heath, who was presiding in his capacity as Father of the House, declined to allow a vote on this issue.

The repeated ballots took nearly six hours. Each candidate gave their own speech of submission to the will of the House, having each been nominated and seconded by Members in separate speeches. Martin was the frontrunner going into the ballot and was never in any danger of losing during the election, winning every ballot by at least 76 votes.

As a result of this election, the rules for electing a Speaker were changed the following year to a use a secret and exhaustive ballot. This procedure was first used in the Speaker election of 2009.

== Results ==
Under the old system for electing Speakers of the House of Commons, a candidate would be nominated and seconded, and alternative candidates would be offered as 'amendments' to that initial motion. In 2000, 11 candidates stepped forward, leading Edward Heath, presiding in his capacity as Father of the House, to have the candidates voted on two at a time. He called Michael Martin to be nominated first. In the event, no candidate was able to surpass Martin in any of the ballots, and once all Martin's opponents had been eliminated from the contest, the original motion that he be elected Speaker was met with some audible opposition. A division was therefore held, in which the motion was approved by 370 votes to 8. Martin was thus elected Speaker.

| Winner | Loser |
|---|---|
| Michael Martin: 345 (71.1%) | Sir Alan Haselhurst: 140 (28.9%) |
| Michael Martin: 409 (83.1%) | Alan Beith: 83 (16.9%) |
| Michael Martin: 341 (66.7%) | Gwyneth Dunwoody: 170 (33.3%) |
| Michael Martin: 317 (56.8%) | Sir George Young: 241 (43.2%) |
| Michael Martin: 381 (79.5%) | Menzies Campbell: 98 (20.5%) |
| Michael Martin: 257 (57.2%) | David Clark: 192 (42.8%) |
| Michael Martin: 340 (74.6%) | Nicholas Winterton: 116 (25.4%) |
| Michael Martin: 309 (91.2%) | John McWilliam: 30 (8.8%) |
| Michael Martin: 290 (66.5%) | Michael Lord: 146 (33.5%) |
| Michael Martin: 287 (68.8%) | Sir Patrick Cormack: 130 (31.2%) |
| Michael Martin: 282 (67.5%) | Richard Shepherd: 136 (32.5%) |
| Michael Martin: 370 (97.9%) | Against: 8 (2.1%) |
