= Kevin McVey =

National secretary of the Scottish Socialish Party

Kevin McVey is a political activist in Scotland and former national secretary of the Scottish Socialist Party. Once a member of the Labour Party, joining the Labour Party Young Socialists in 1984, McVey was expelled from the party under Neil Kinnock's leadership for his association with the Militant tendency.

He was formerly president of the Socialist Students Society at the University of Stirling, where he protested university plans to present former defence secretary Dr John Reid with an honorary degree.

In 2009, McVey was selected as the SSP candidate for the 2009 Glasgow North East by-election, where he won 152 votes (0.7%). However, he stood down as the SSP's national secretary at the party's 2015 conference.

McVey was the lead candidate in the Central Scotland region for the left-wing alliance RISE at the 2016 Scottish Parliament election.

As of December 2018, he remains a member of the SSP executive.
