= Glasgow Springburn (UK Parliament constituency) =

Parliamentary constituency in the United Kingdom, 1918–2005

- Former burgh constituency for the House of Commons
- Subdivision: City of Glasgow

1918–2005
- Created from: Glasgow Partick and North West Lanarkshire
- Replaced by: Glasgow North East

Glasgow Springburn was a constituency of the House of Commons of the Parliament of the United Kingdom from 1918 until the 2005 general election, when it was largely replaced by the Glasgow North East constituency.

The last and longest-serving Member of Parliament, Michael Martin, formerly a member of the Labour Party, was elected Speaker of the House of Commons in 2000 and held the post until his resignation in 2009. By convention, the major parties (Labour, Conservative Party and Liberal Democrats) do not stand against a sitting Speaker in a general election, and in the 2001 and 2005 general elections he stood as "Speaker seeking re-election." Other parties, including the Scottish National Party, however, continued to contest the seat.

== Boundaries ==
Glasgow Springburn from 1950 to 1955

1918–1950: "That portion of the city which is bounded by a line commencing at a point on the municipal boundary on the south-east side of Cumbernauld Road, where that road is intersected by the east side of the Caledonian Railway (Glasgow Lines), thence northward to the centre line of Cumbernauld Road, thence south-westward and westward along the centre line of Cumbernauld Road and Alexandra Parade to the centre line of Castle Street, thence northward along the centre line of Castle Street and Springburn Road to the centre line of Fountainwell Road, thence north-westward along the centre line of Fountainwell Road to the centre line of the North British Railway (Edinburgh and Glasgow Line), thence northward along the centre line of the said North British Railway to a Point on the municipal boundary about 327 yards north of the centre of Hawthorn Street, where the said North British Railway intersects that street, thence northward, eastward, southward, eastward, southward, westward, south-eastward and southwestward along the municipal boundary to the point of commencement."

1950–1955: The County of the City of Glasgow wards of Cowcaddens, Cowlairs, and Springburn.

1955–1974: The County of the City of Glasgow wards of Cowlairs and Springburn.

1974–1983: The County of the City of Glasgow wards of Cowlairs, Dennistoun, and Springburn.

1983–1997: The City of Glasgow District electoral divisions of Alexandra Park/Dennistoun and Keppochhill/Cowlairs.

1997–2005: The City of Glasgow District electoral divisions of Carntyne/Robroyston, Royston/Dennistoun, and Springburn/Barmulloch.

== Members of Parliament ==
Election	Member	Party
1918	F. A. Macquisten	Unionist
1922	George Hardie	Labour
1931	Charles Emmott	Conservative
1935	George Hardie	Labour
1937 by-election	Agnes Hardie	Labour
1945	John Forman	Labour and Co-operative
1964	Dick Buchanan	Labour
1979	Michael Martin	Labour
2000	Michael Martin	Speaker
2005	constituency abolished	

== Election results ==
=== Elections in the 1910s ===
William Pringle

General election 1918: Glasgow Springburn
Party		Candidate	Votes	%	±%
C	Unionist	F. A. Macquisten	10,786	52.7	
	Labour	George Hardie	7,996	39.1	
	Liberal	William Pringle	1,669	8.2	
Majority			2,790	13.6	
Turnout			20,451	60.9	
	Unionist win (new seat)				
C indicates candidate endorsed by the coalition government.

=== Elections in the 1920s ===
General election 1922: Glasgow Springburn
Party	Candidate	Votes	%	±%
Labour	George Hardie	15,771	60.5	+21.4
Unionist	F. A. Macquisten	10,311	39.5	−13.2
Majority		5,460	21.0	N/A
Turnout		26,082	78.5	+17.6
Labour gain from Unionist		Swing	+17.3	

General election 1923: Glasgow Springburn
Party	Candidate	Votes	%	±%
Labour	George Hardie	14,535	62.3	+1.8
Unionist	David Alexander Guild	8,814	37.7	−1.8
Majority		5,721	24.6	+3.6
Turnout		23,349	68.1	−10.4
Labour hold		Swing	+1.8	

General election 1924: Glasgow Springburn
Party	Candidate	Votes	%	±%
Labour	George Hardie	15,635	56.5	−5.8
Unionist	David Alexander Guild	12,043	43.5	+5.8
Majority		3,592	13.0	−11.6
Turnout		27,678	79.3	+11.2
Labour hold		Swing	−5.8	

General election 1929: Glasgow Springburn
Party	Candidate	Votes	%	±%
Labour	George Hardie	21,079	65.5	+9.0
Unionist	John McSkimming	11,110	34.5	−9.0
Majority		9,969	31.0	+18.0
Turnout		32,189	73.6	−5.7
Labour hold		Swing	+9.0	

=== Elections in the 1930s ===
General election 1931: Glasgow Springburn
Party	Candidate	Votes	%	±%
Unionist	Charles Emmott	16,092	47.2	+12.7
Labour	George Hardie	16,058	47.0	−18.5
Communist	A. Haines	1,997	5.8	New
Majority		34	0.2	N/A
Turnout		34,147	75.4	+1.8
Unionist gain from Labour		Swing	+15.6	

General election 1935: Glasgow Springburn
Party	Candidate	Votes	%	±%
Labour	George Hardie	20,286	63.1	+16.1
Unionist	J. McNicol	11,859	36.9	−10.3
Majority		8,427	26.2	N/A
Turnout		32,145	71.1	−4.3
Labour gain from Unionist		Swing	+13.2	

1937 Glasgow Springburn by-election
Party	Candidate	Votes	%	±%
Labour	Agnes Hardie	14,859	62.6	−0.5
Unionist	McInnes Shaw	8,881	37.4	+0.5
Majority		5,978	25.2	−1.0
Turnout		23,740	50.9	−20.2
Labour hold		Swing	−0.5	

=== Elections in the 1940s ===
General election 1945: Glasgow Springburn
Party	Candidate	Votes	%	±%
Labour Co-op	John Forman	21,698	65.0	+1.9
Unionist	Robert Henry Sherwood Calver	11,690	35.0	−1.9
Majority		10,008	30.0	+3.8
Turnout		33,388	63.6	−7.5
Labour Co-op hold		Swing	+1.9	

=== Elections in the 1950s ===
General election 1950: Glasgow Springburn
Party	Candidate	Votes	%	±%
Labour Co-op	John Forman	25,603	59.7	−5.3
Unionist	J. McNicol	13,666	31.9	−3.1
Liberal	David W Campbell	1,853	4.3	New
Communist	R. F. Horne	1,764	4.1	New
Majority		11,937	27.8	−2.2
Turnout		42,886	76.9	+13.3
Labour Co-op hold		Swing	−1.1	

General election 1951: Glasgow Springburn
Party	Candidate	Votes	%	±%
Labour Co-op	John Forman	27,749	62.4	+2.7
Unionist	Walter H. Bennett	16,748	37.8	+5.9
Majority		11,001	24.6	−3.2
Turnout		44,497	78.0	+3.1
Labour Co-op hold		Swing	−1.6	

General election 1955: Glasgow Springburn
Party	Candidate	Votes	%	±%
Labour Co-op	John Forman	16,131	57.5	−4.9
Unionist	James A. Young	10,358	37.0	−0.8
Communist	Finlay Hart	1,532	5.5	New
Majority		5,773	20.5	−4.1
Turnout		28,021	69.1	−8.9
Labour Co-op hold		Swing	−2.1	

General election 1959: Glasgow Springburn
Party	Candidate	Votes	%	±%
Labour Co-op	John Forman	16,297	58.8	+1.3
Unionist	Teddy Taylor	10,167	36.7	−0.3
Communist	Finlay Hart	1,235	4.5	−1.0
Majority		6,130	22.1	+1.6
Turnout		27,699	72.6	+3.5
Labour Co-op hold		Swing	+0.8	

=== Elections in the 1960s ===
General election 1964: Glasgow Springburn
Party	Candidate	Votes	%	±%
Labour	Richard Buchanan	16,828	65.3	+6.5
Unionist	Robert B. J. C. Black	5,632	21.8	−14.9
SNP	Angus Mclntosh	2,366	9.2	New
Communist	Neil McLellan	950	3.7	−0.8
Majority		11,196	43.5	+21.4
Turnout		25,776	69.2	−3.4
Labour hold		Swing	+10.7	

General election 1966: Glasgow Springburn
Party	Candidate	Votes	%	±%
Labour	Richard Buchanan	15,998	67.8	+2.5
Conservative	Douglas H. Heatlie	4,499	19.1	−2.7
SNP	William J. Morton	2,222	9.4	+0.2
Communist	Neil McLellan	867	3.7	0.0
Majority		11,499	48.7	+5.2
Turnout		23,586	66.6	−2.6
Labour hold		Swing	+2.6	

=== Elections in the 1970s ===
General election 1970: Glasgow Springburn
Party	Candidate	Votes	%	±%
Labour	Richard Buchanan	14,968	64.3	−3.5
Conservative	John Sorbie	4,574	19.6	+0.5
SNP	William J. Morton	3,323	14.3	+4.9
Communist	Neil McLellan	423	1.8	−1.9
Majority		10,394	44.7	−4.0
Turnout		23,288	61.3	−5.3
Labour hold		Swing	−2.0	

General election February 1974: Glasgow Springburn
Party	Candidate	Votes	%	±%
Labour	Richard Buchanan	18,067	53.7	−10.6
SNP	William J. Morton	7,672	22.8	+8.5
Conservative	N.M. McCune	7,452	22.1	+2.5
Communist	Neil McLellan	478	1.4	−0.4
Majority		10,395	30.9	−13.8
Turnout		33,669	70.4	+9.1
Labour hold		Swing	−9.5	

General election October 1974: Glasgow Springburn
Party	Candidate	Votes	%	±%
Labour	Richard Buchanan	17,444	54.6	+0.9
SNP	William J. Morton	9,049	28.3	+5.5
Conservative	S. Taylor	4,245	13.3	−8.8
Liberal	T. Marshall	865	2.7	New
Communist	Neil McLellan	352	1.1	−0.3
Majority		8,395	26.3	−4.6
Turnout		31,955	66.5	+3.9
Labour hold		Swing	−2.3	

General election 1979: Glasgow Springburn
Party	Candidate	Votes	%	±%
Labour	Michael Martin	18,871	66.1	+11.5
Conservative	G. Ross McKay	6,100	21.3	+8.0
SNP	William J. Morton	3,587	12.6	−15.7
Majority		12,771	44.8	+18.5
Turnout		28,558	67.8	+1.3
Labour hold		Swing	+1.7	

=== Elections in the 1980s ===
General election 1983: Glasgow Springburn
Party	Candidate	Votes	%	±%
Labour	Michael Martin	22,481	64.7	−1.4
Liberal	James Kelly	4,882	14.1	New
Conservative	David Tweedie	4,565	13.1	−8.2
SNP	John F. McLaughlin	2,804	8.1	−4.5
Majority		17,599	50.6	+5.8
Turnout		34,732	65.1	−2.7
Labour hold		Swing	−7.7	

General election 1987: Glasgow Springburn
Party	Candidate	Votes	%	±%
Labour	Michael Martin	25,617	73.6	+8.9
SNP	Brendan O'Hara	3,554	10.2	+2.1
Conservative	Mark Call	2,870	8.3	−4.8
Liberal	David Rennie	2,746	7.9	−6.2
Majority		22,063	63.4	+12.8
Turnout		34,787	67.5	+2.4
Labour hold		Swing	+3.4	

=== Elections in the 1990s ===
General election 1992: Glasgow Springburn
Party	Candidate	Votes	%	±%
Labour	Michael Martin	20,369	67.7	−5.9
SNP	Stuart Miller	5,863	19.5	+9.3
Conservative	Andrew C.R. Barnett	2,625	8.7	+0.4
Liberal Democrats	Rod Ackland	1,242	4.1	−3.8
Majority		14,506	48.2	−15.2
Turnout		30,099	65.7	−1.8
Labour hold		Swing	−7.6	

General election 1997: Glasgow Springburn
Party	Candidate	Votes	%	±%
Labour	Michael Martin	22,534	71.4	+3.7
SNP	John R. Brady	5,208	16.5	−3.0
Conservative	Mark B. Holdsworth	1,893	6.0	−2.7
Liberal Democrats	Jim Alexander	1,349	4.3	+0.2
Scottish Socialist	John Lawson	407	1.3	New
Referendum	Andrew J. Keating	186	0.6	New
Majority		17,326	54.9	+6.7
Turnout		31,577	58.9	−6.8
Labour hold		Swing	+3.3	

=== Elections in the 2000s ===
General election 2001: Glasgow Springburn
Party	Candidate	Votes	%	±%
Speaker	Michael Martin	16,053	66.6	−4.8
SNP	Sandy Bain	4,675	19.4	+2.9
Scottish Socialist	Carolyn Leckie	1,879	7.8	+6.5
Scottish Unionist	Daniel Houston	1,289	5.3	New
Independent	Richard E.W. Silvester	208	0.9	New
Majority		11,378	47.2	−7.7
Turnout		24,104	43.7	−15.2
Speaker hold		Swing		

Parliament of the United Kingdom
Preceded by West Bromwich West	Constituency represented by the speaker 2000–2005	Succeeded by Glasgow North East
