= Venues of the 2014 Commonwealth Games =

This article lists the Venues of the 2014 Commonwealth Games.

== East End cluster ==
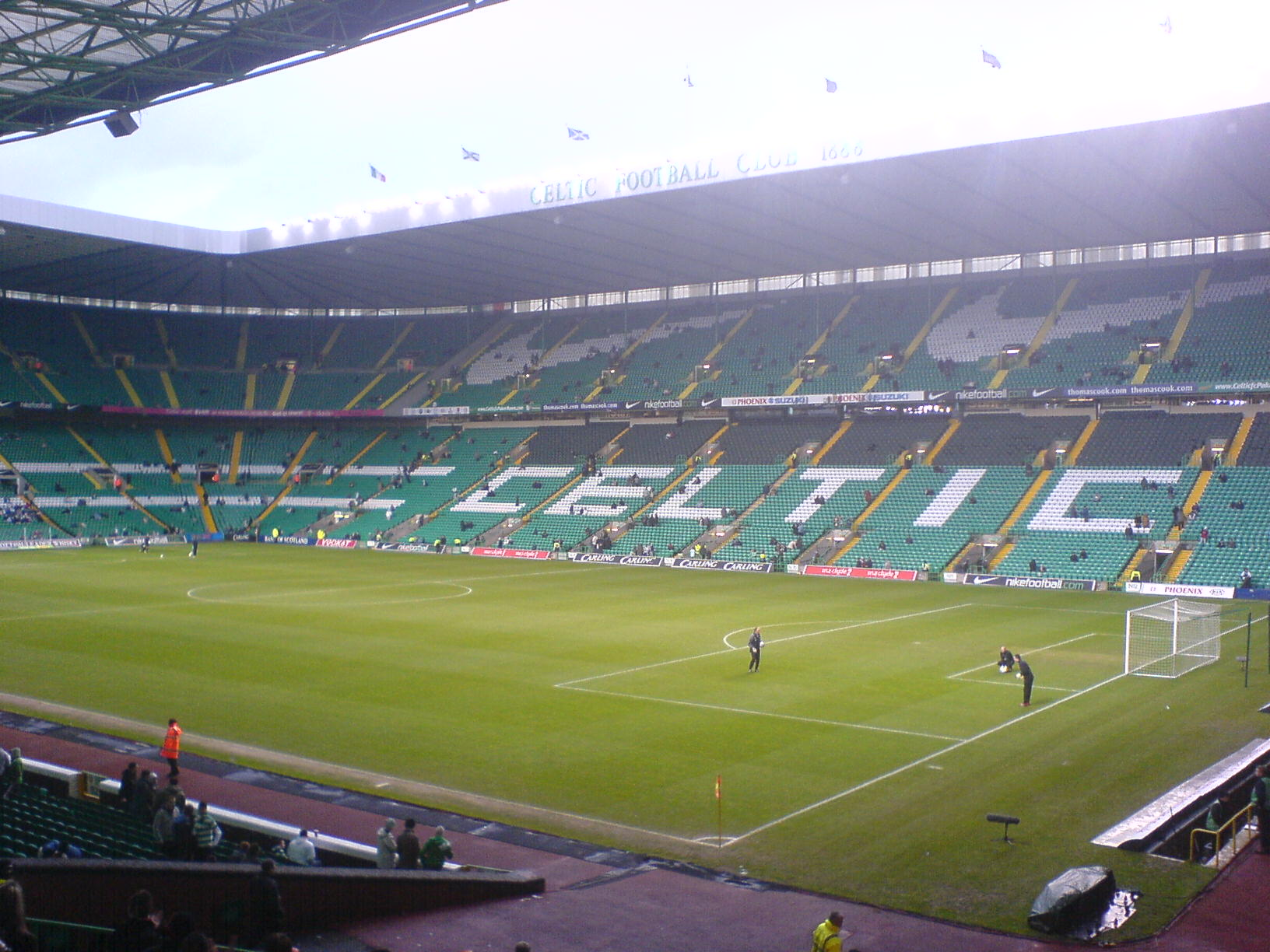
Celtic Park

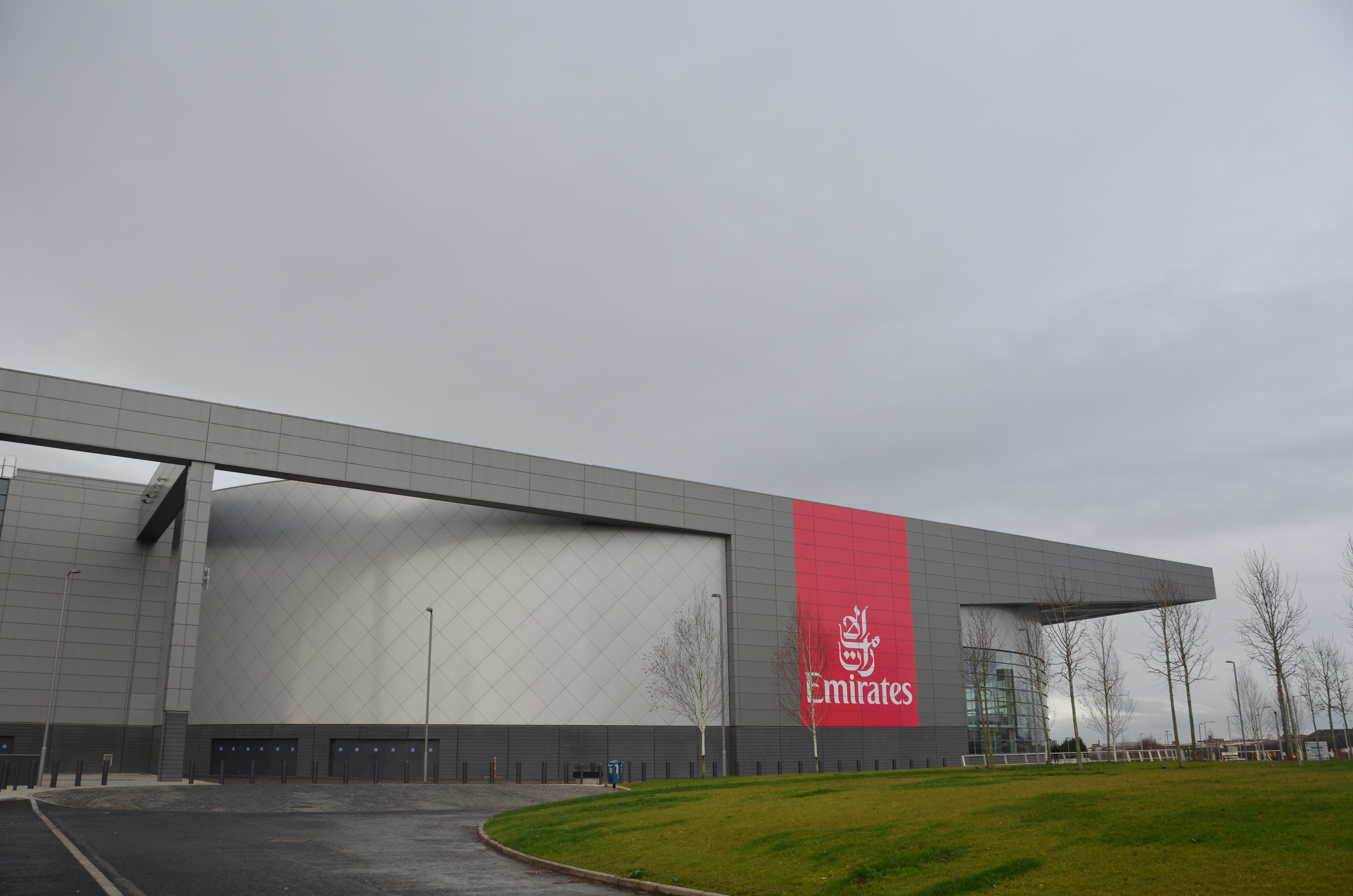
Commonwealth Arena and Sir Chris Hoy Velodrome

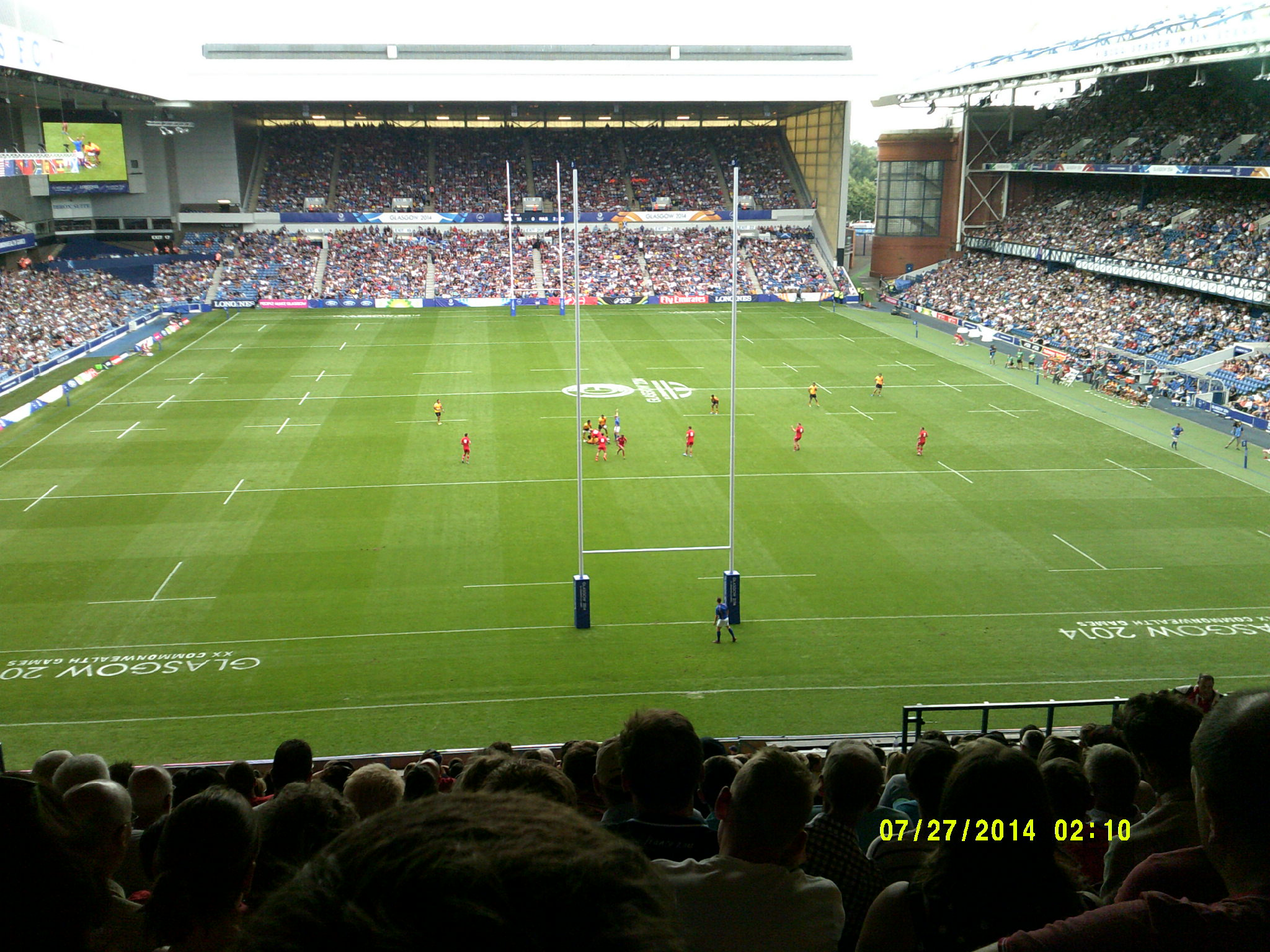
Ibrox Stadium

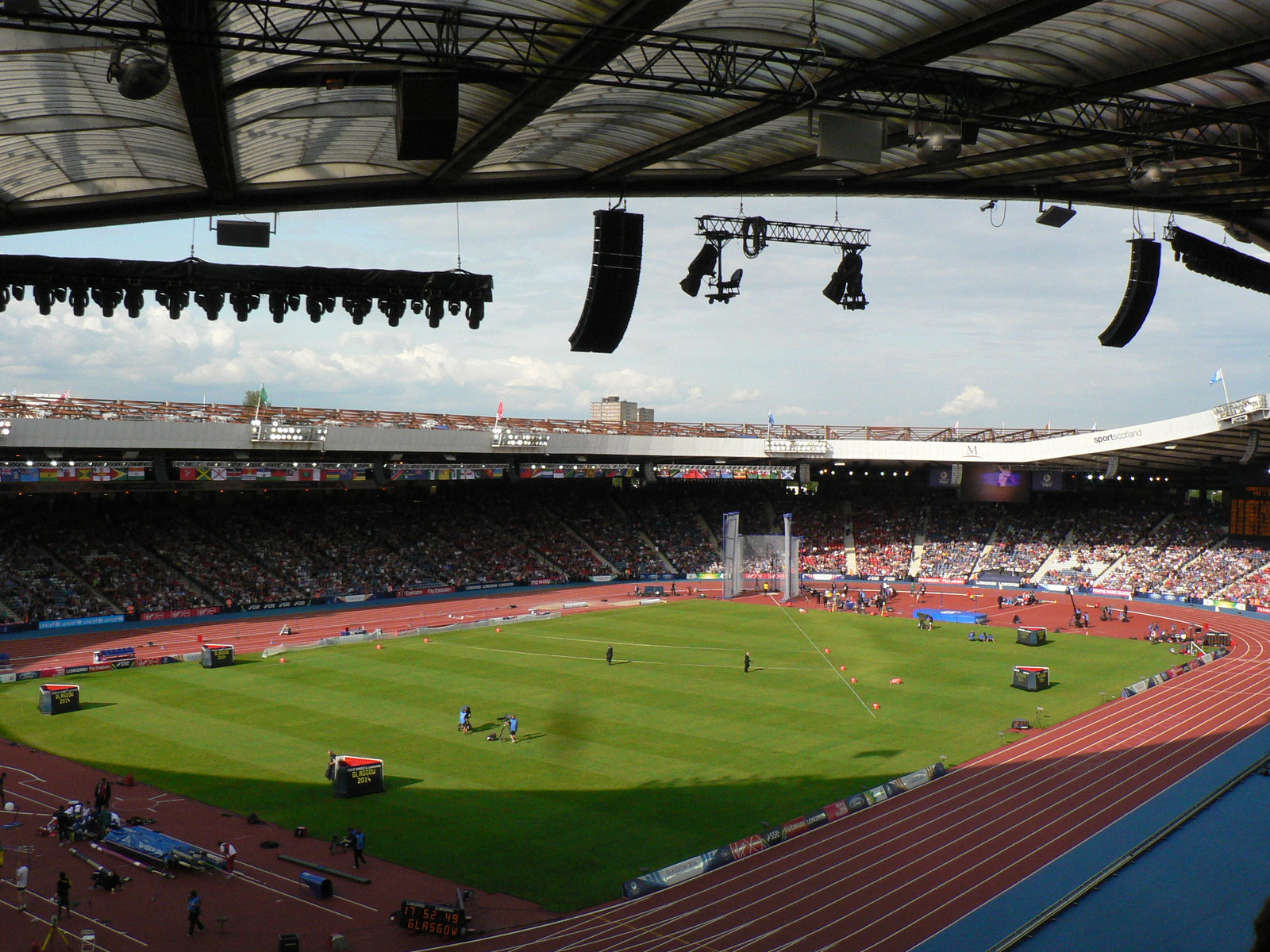
Hampden Park

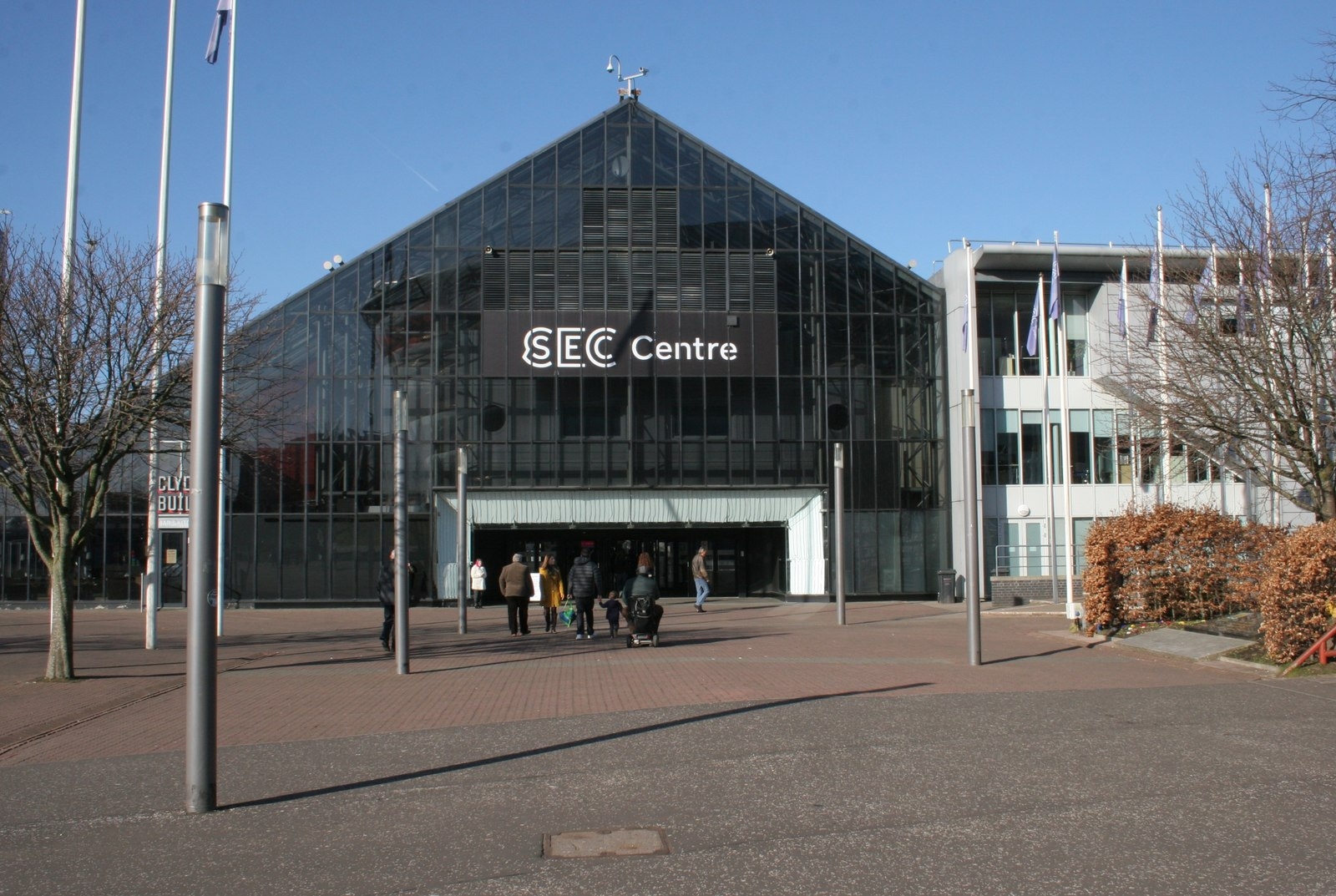
Scottish Exhibition and Conference Centre

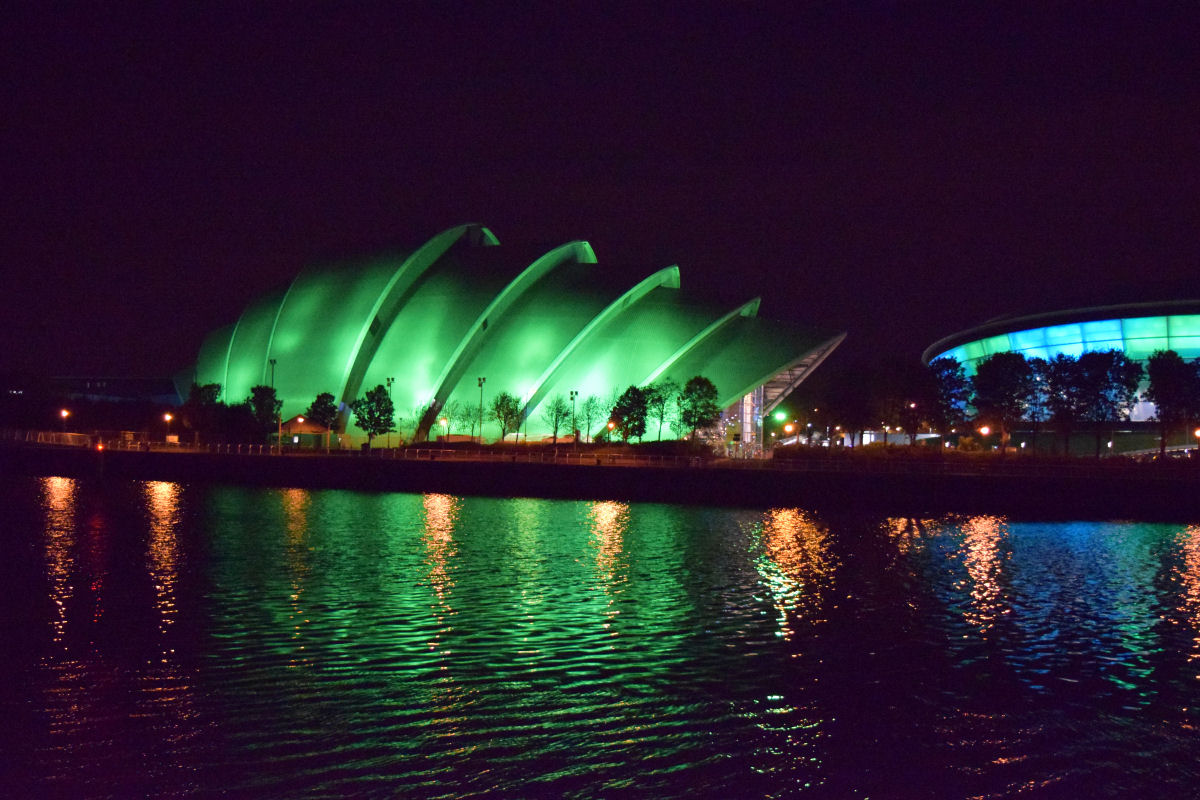
Clyde Auditorium

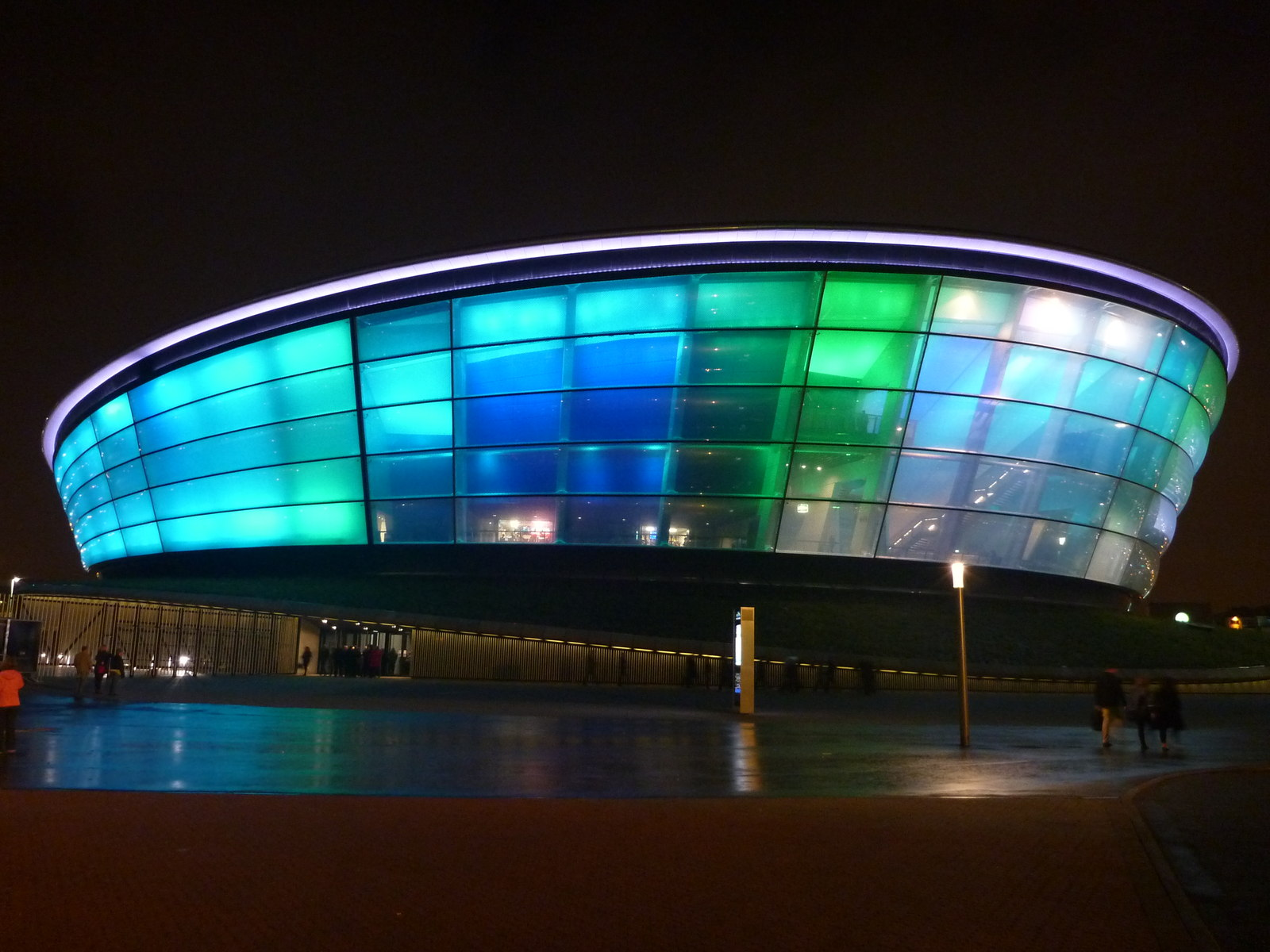
SSE Hydro

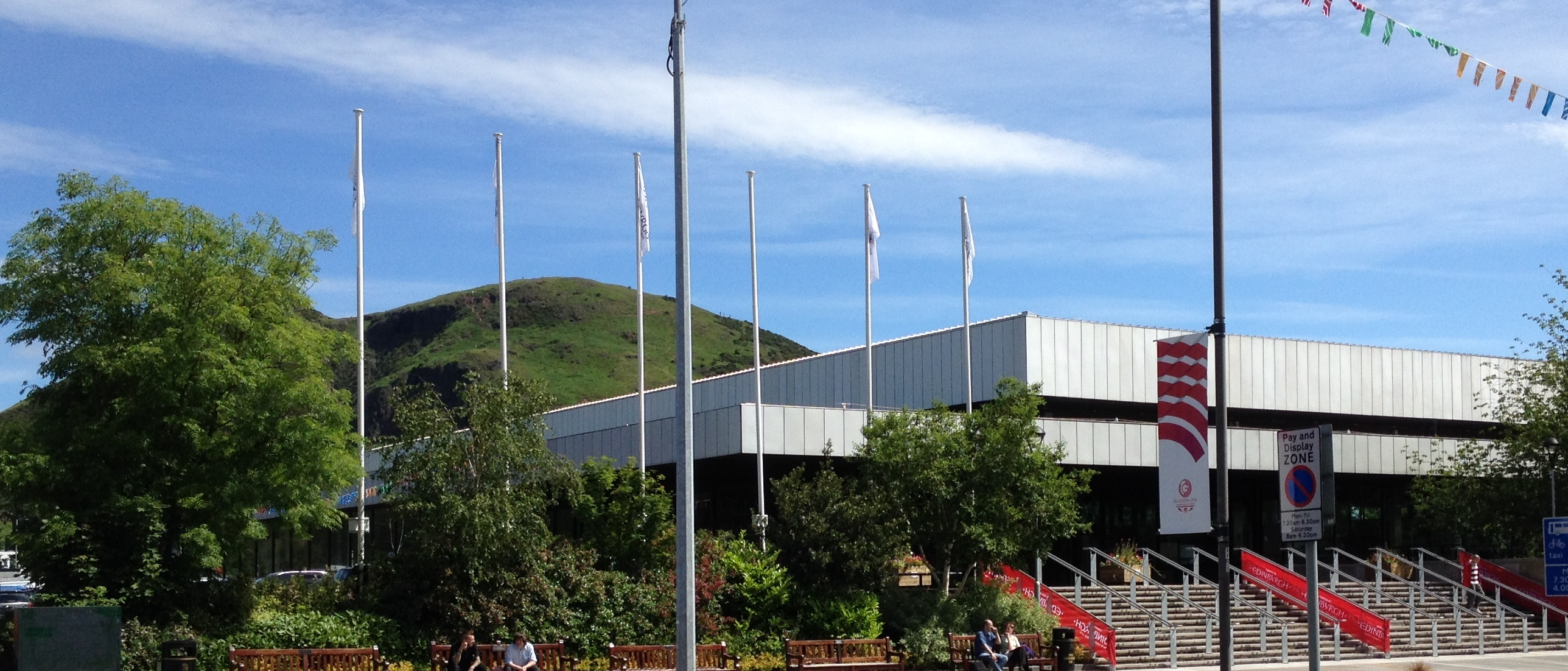
Royal Commonwealth Pool in Edinburgh

Celtic Park hosted for the opening ceremony of the Games. The Commonwealth Arena and Sir Chris Hoy Velodrome precinct, situated at Parkhead in the East End of the city, hosted the Badminton as well as Track cycling. Glasgow Green was the starting point for the free Athletics (Marathon), Cycling (Road Race) and Cycling (Time Trial) events. Glasgow Green was the venue for Field hockey and saw the construction of a new Glasgow Green Hockey Centre. Tollcross International Swimming Centre, was the venue for Swimming events. It already had one Olympic standard 50 metre swimming pool, which was extensively upgraded, and a second 50-metre pool was added for the Games as a warm-up facility. The existing permanent seating capacity was increased by 1,000. Combined with additional temporary seating there was over 5,000 seats for the Games.

| Venue | Sports | Capacity |
|---|---|---|
| Commonwealth Sports Arena | Badminton | 5,000 |
| Sir Chris Hoy Velodrome | Cycling (track) | 4,500 |
| Glasgow Green Hockey Centre | Field hockey | 5,000 |
| Tollcross International Swimming Centre | Swimming | 5,000 |
| Celtic Park | Opening Ceremony | 60,000 |

== South Side cluster ==
Ibrox Stadium, in the South Side, was the venue for the Rugby Sevens tournament. Mountain biking was held on the Cathkin Braes in Rutherglen, the Royal Burgh neighbouring the City. The Hampden Park hosted all the track and field events as well as the closing ceremony.

| Venue | Sports | Capacity |
|---|---|---|
| Ibrox | Rugby Sevens | 52,000 |
| Hampden | Athletics, Closing Ceremony | 46,000 |
| Cathkin Braes Mountain Bike Trails | Mountain Biking | N/A |

== West End cluster ==
The Scottish Exhibition and Conference Centre, located in the West End of the city, hosted the Wrestling, Judo and Boxing, as well as the Main Press Centre and the International Broadcast Centre, benefiting from its strategic position adjacent to the headquarters of BBC Scotland and STV at Pacific Quay. The Clyde Auditorium hosted Weightlifting, whilst the new SSE Hydro was used for the Gymnastics and Netball events. Kelvingrove Park, also in the city's West End, was the venue for Bowls and has five bowling greens installed for competitive use. A comprehensive upgrade and refurbishment of the park was completed ahead of the Games. Scotstoun Leisure Centre hosted Table tennis and Squash.

| Venue | | Sports | Capacity |
|---|---|---|---|
| SECC Precinct | SECC Halls | Boxing (Preliminaries) | 2,000 |
| SECC Precinct | SECC Halls | Judo/Wrestling | 2,000 |
| SECC Precinct | SECC Halls | Netball (Preliminaries) | 2,000 |
| SECC Precinct | Clyde Auditorium | Weightlifting | 3,000 |
| SECC Precinct | The SSE Hydro | Gymnastics (Artistic and Rhythmic), Boxing (Finals), Netball (Finals) | 13,000 |
| SECC Precinct | Precinct Total | | 20,000 |
| Scotstoun Stadium | | Squash, Table Tennis | 12,500 |
| Kelvingrove Lawn Bowls Centre | | Lawn Bowls | 2,500 |

== Satellite venues ==
The Shooting competitions took place at the Ministry of Defence full-bore rifle and clay target ranges at Barry Buddon Training Area, near Dundee, which were also used in the 1986 Commonwealth Games. There were temporary ranges built for the small-bore rifle and pistol events. Diving was held at the Royal Commonwealth Pool in Edinburgh, located 45 miles (72 km) to the east, which held the annual Edinburgh Festival at the same time as the 2014 Commonwealth Games. Strathclyde Country Park, beside Hamilton and Motherwell, hosted the Triathlon event.

| Venue | Location | Sports | Capacity |
|---|---|---|---|
| Barry Buddon Shooting Centre | Barry | Shooting | N/A |
| Royal Commonwealth Pool | Edinburgh | Diving | 2,000 |
| Strathclyde Country Park | Motherwell | Triathlon | N/A |

== Athletes' village ==
The Athletes Village for the 2014 Commonwealth Games was situated on a 35-hectare (86-acre) site, in Dalmarnock, Glasgow. The whole project was designed by RMJM. Primarily the site was used as accommodation for the athletes competing in the games as well as team officials from every competing nation for the duration of the games. As well as accommodation, the athletes' village also housed a retail zone, dining hall, medical facilities, gym, religious centre and recreational spaces.

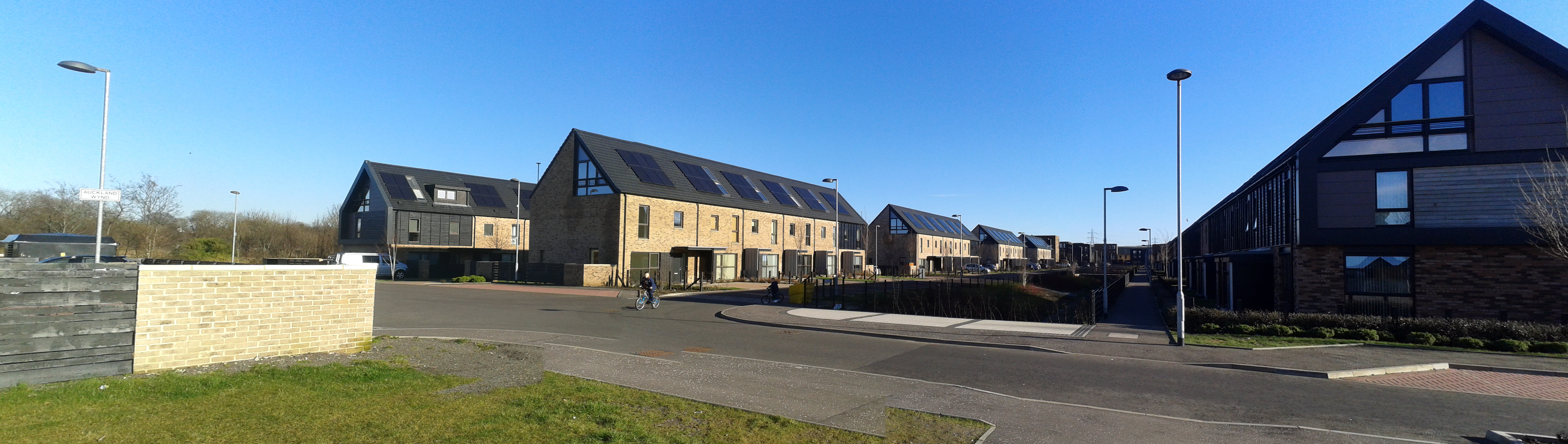
The 2014 Commonwealth Games athlete's village at Dalmarnock, Glasgow

== See also ==
- List of Commonwealth Games venues
