= Athletes' Village (Glasgow 2014) =

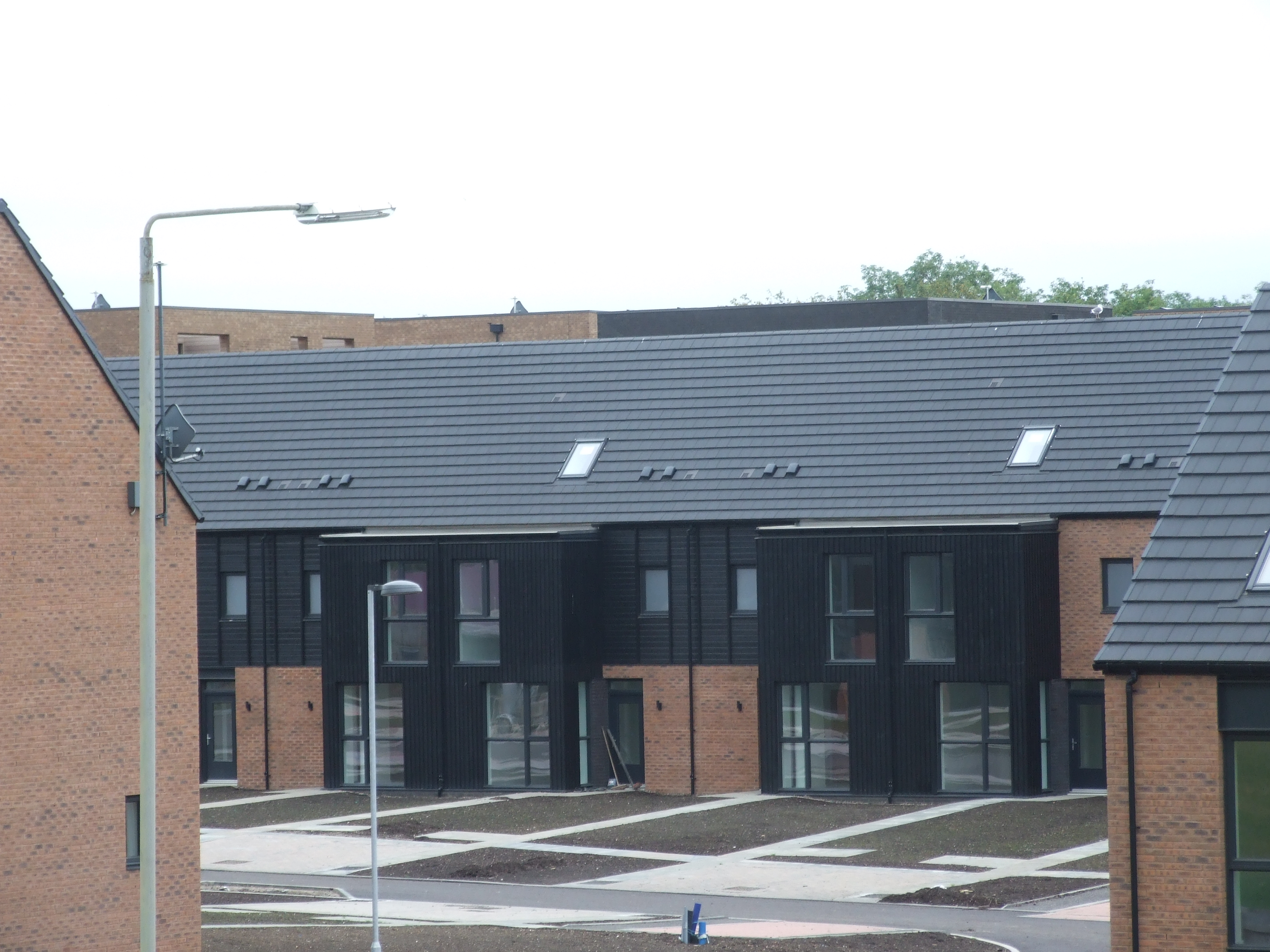
- Interactive map of the Athletes' Village area

General information
- Status: In use
- Type: Accommodation
- Architectural style: International Modern
- Location: Glasgow, Scotland
- Coordinates: 55.842485°N 4.209344°W
- Current tenants: Commonwealth athletes and team officials
- Construction started: March 2012
- Completed: January 2014

Design and construction
- Architect: Paul Stallan Studio @ RMJM
- Developer: City Legacy consortium

The Athletes Village for the 2014 Commonwealth Games was situated on a 35-hectare (86-acre) site, in the east end of Glasgow. The project was designed by the Paul Stallan Studio @ RMJM. At first the site was used as accommodation for up to 8,000 athletes and officials from all over the Commonwealth nations, as well as providing a retail area, recreation area, dining hall and medical facilities for the athletes. After the commonwealth games, the site was further developed and has up to 1,400 homes, a portion of which are available for social rental.

== Location ==
The 35-hectare site, set in Dalmarnock in Glasgow's East End, aims to be a purpose-built village at the heart of one of Europe's largest regeneration areas. Designed with input from athletes, the Village was right on the doorstep of the Celtic Park venue for the Opening Ceremony in July 2014, and the new Commonwealth Arena and Sir Chris Hoy Velodrome, which were officially opened on 6 October 2012.

== Planning and construction ==
Work first began for the project in August 2009, with the City Legacy Consortium chose the 35-hectare site in the east end of Glasgow. The site was previously a mix of residential, industrial and open spaces with significant areas of vacant land with approximately 1,600 people living in the immediate area in around 859 households.

The Athletes Village created up 1,500 jobs in Glasgow ranging from architects and designers to apprentices and highly skilled tradesmen from all over the world.

Site Clearance was required to allow the selective excavation of around 140,000 m^{3} (4,900,000 cu ft) of contaminated soils and materials from different sections across 33 hectares (82 acres) out of the 35-hectare (86-acre) site. The majority of which was treated on site to permit its reuse. Soil washing using a bespoke plant – which was assembled specifically for this contract – was used on roughly 100,000 m^{3} (3,500,000 cu ft). This method of soil washing is an extremely sustainable remediation option which took place on site. As a result, very little of the material had to go to landfill meaning less lorry movements; thus reducing costs and carbon footprint, a key target of the games as well as the Scottish Parliament.

There was a focus on using energy and products which are both sustainable and re-usable promoting a friendly, green image for the games and Scotland. 10% of the energy used in the village was aimed to be generated by sources of renewable energy on site, which will be included in the construction of the site. Also, at the very least 10% of the material used for the construction of the village will be recycled already.

== Facilities ==
Primarily the site was used as accommodation for the athletes competing in the games as well as team officials from every competing nation for the duration of the games. As well as accommodation the athletes' village also provided an exclusive retail area for the athletes as well as a dining hall and medical facilities.

== After the games ==
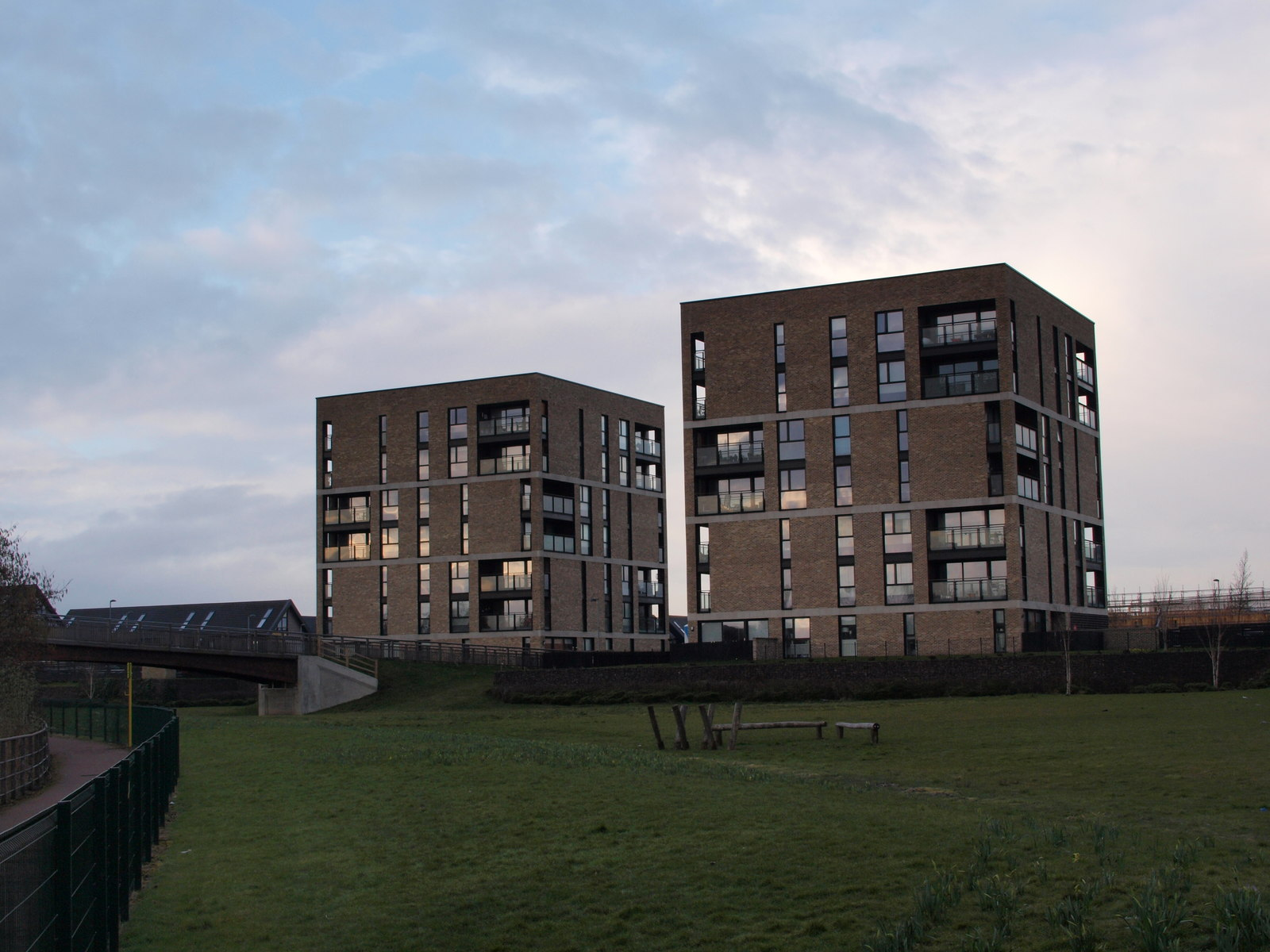
Cube-shaped apartment buildings at the Athletes' Village site near the River Clyde

Following the Games, when the temporary facilities were removed from the Games site, more land was cleared for housing, with up to 1,400 homes being built (including approximately 300 private homes, 400 homes for rent and a new 120-bed care home for the elderly). The mix of properties of different sizes and types will be important in creating a more diverse, yet balanced community in the area. This, in turn, will aid the sale of the properties. The unique design of the accommodation is highly flexible and allows for relatively simple post-Games retrofit.

In 2016, plans were confirmed for the construction of a large primary school in the area. Riverbank Primary School opened in August 2019. A pedestrian footbridge was constructed across the river to access the Cuningar Loop, a landscaped park developed from previously undeveloped derelict land.
