= Cuningar Loop =

Meander in Glasgow, Scotland

Coordinates: 55°50′24″N 4°12′02″W

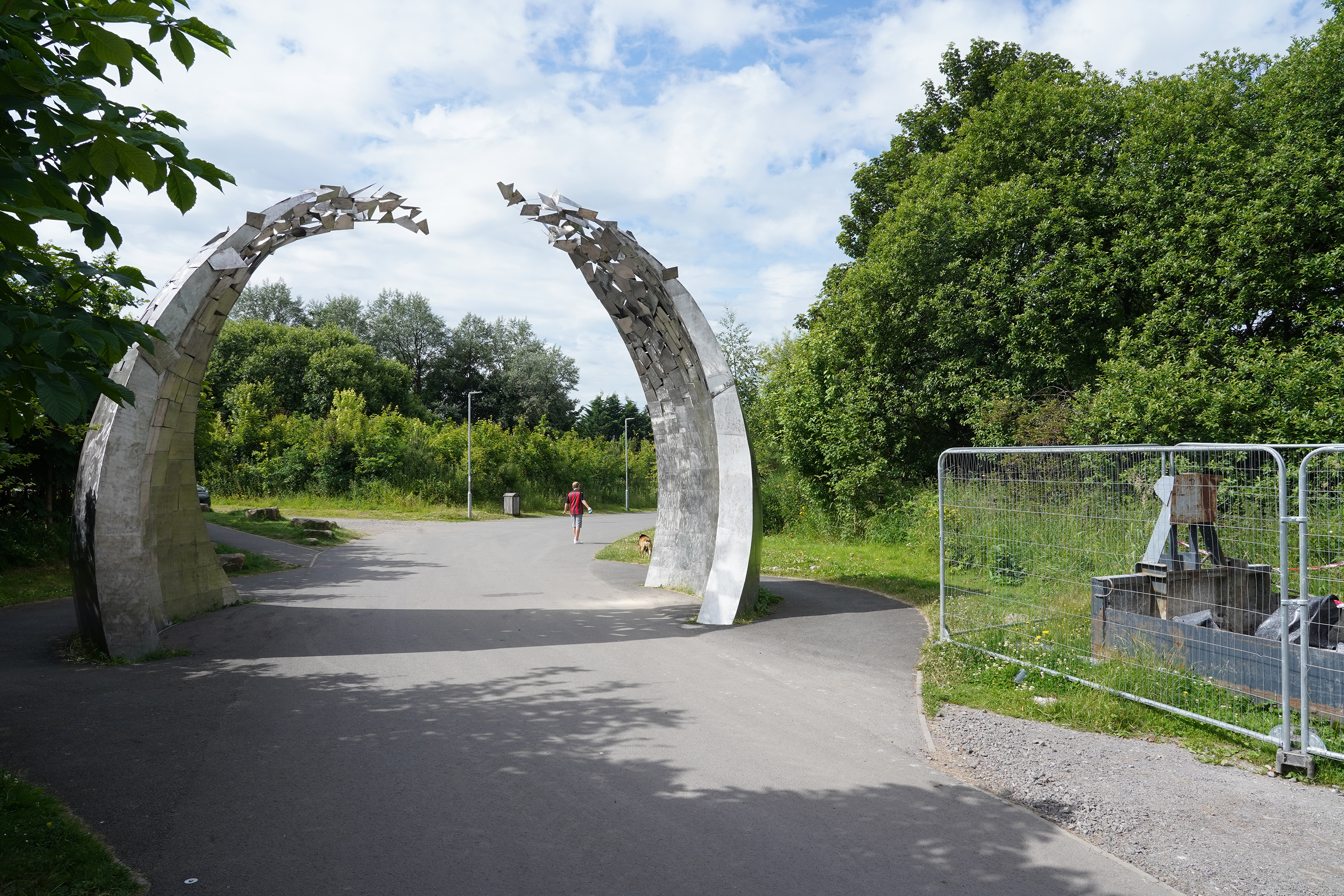
'Evolve' metallic sculpture by Rob Mulholland at park's southern entrance

The Cuningar Loop is a meander on the River Clyde in Scotland which was converted to a woodland park in the mid-2010s. It lies within the territory of Rutherglen, South Lanarkshire, and Glasgow City Council, and is directly east of the district of Dalmarnock in Glasgow.

== History ==
The first Glasgow Water Company's Act was obtained in 1806, and the company began to supply water early in 1809. Before the Victorian Loch Katrine aqueduct project was completed in the 1850s, it supplied water to Glasgow. Cuningar Loop was the location of several reservoirs that raised water from the Clyde and pumped it to a secondary reservoir at Sydney Street, from where it was distributed throughout the city. The Dalmarnock reservoirs were originally designed under the direction of Thomas Telford and James Watt.

The derelict site was transformed into a country park, augmenting the 2014 Commonwealth Games village across the river. The site features boulders for rock climbing, riverside boardwalks, a BMX track, a playpark for children including a 'flying fox', public art installations and a common green area capable of hosting events.

In 2019, holes were dug in the park in preparation for a facility to access naturally heated water underground in disused coal mines to provide it to nearby homes. The research was still ongoing in 2021.

In the autumn of 2021 the park was the Glasgow area venue for the touring Jurassic Encounter open-air attraction featuring life-size animatronic dinosaurs. Later that year, a 23 metres (75 ft)-high sculpture by Steuart Padwick titled 'The Hope Sculpture' was installed.

Since March 2025, the park has been host to Cuningar Loop parkrun.

== Footbridge ==
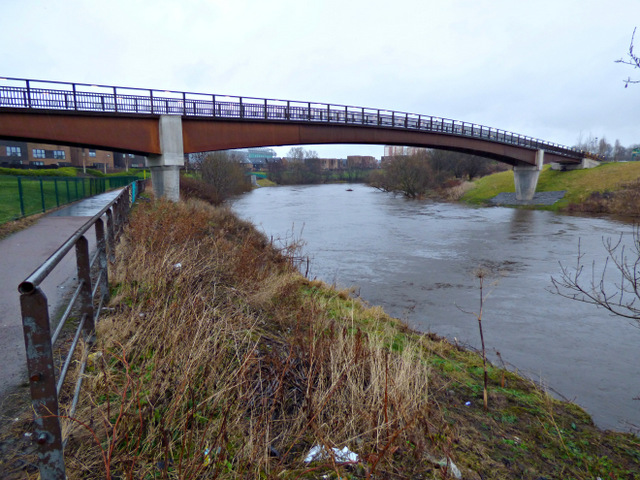
New footbridge connecting the park to the Dalmarnock Legacy Village

A footbridge over the river connecting the west side of the new park to the Legacy Village area in Dalmarnock (and joining up with the Clyde Walkway and National Cycle Route 75 on the opposite bank) was completed in 2016.
