= Land recycling =

Reuse of abandoned buildings or sites

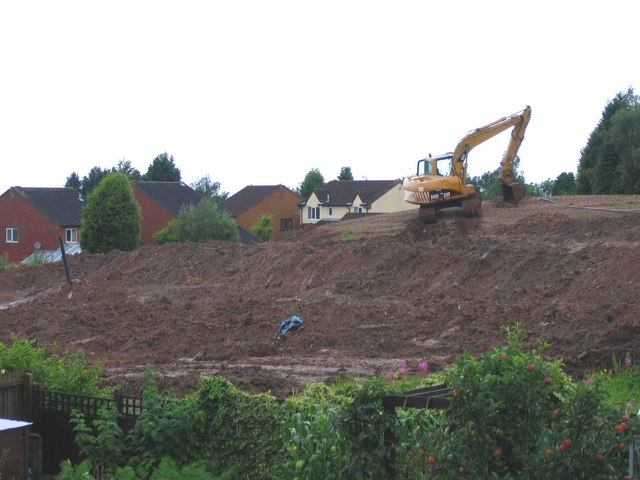
Remediation process in Marlbrook at a former landfill site

Land recycling is the reuse of abandoned, vacant, or underused properties for redevelopment or repurposing. It aims to ensure the reuse of developed land as part of new developments; cleaning up contaminated properties; and reuse and/or making use of used land surrounded by development or nearby infrastructure. End-uses from land recycling may include: mixed-use, residential, commercial, or industrial developments; and/or public open space such as urban open space used by urban parks, community gardens; or larger open space reserves such as regional parks.

Since many abandoned and underutilized properties lie within economically distressed and disadvantaged communities, land recycling often benefits and stimulates re-investment in historically underserved areas. However, due to the previous use of these sites, there can be many health hazards when dealing with the land, such as metals, plastics, asbestos, glass shards, gas generation, and radioactive substances. Such environmentally distressed properties, with site clean-up and mitigation considerations, are commonly referred to as brownfields.

== Types ==
=== Adaptive building ===
The most common form of land recycling is the redevelopment of abandoned or unused building properties. Adaptive building is the development of an old abandoned building to repurpose it into a new building design and/or new purpose. Saving the old buildings and reusing the materials within the buildings is considered more environmentally sustainable than building all new structure with new materials. This repurposing of materials in the existing adaption or to a different building site could include wood, metals, roofing, brick, etc. and would provide products for new projects to prevent excessive waste. Site disruptions are also decreased due to less destruction and building.

The adaptive process also provides a more sustainable way to promote environmentally friendly infrastructure. It also reduces the amount of pollutants that can contaminate the soil and water around the abandoned building. This can be particularly beneficial when repurposing buildings that are near schools, residential neighborhoods, or other workplaces by mitigating occupational hazards from such contaminants commonly found in construction. This is considered more economically friendly when accounting for direct and indirect cost savings to the construction company and to the building owner. The cost of producing new materials and the services that come with manufacturing these products are much more costly than repurposing existing buildings.

=== Brownfield redevelopment ===
The EPA classifies a brownfield as "A brownfield is a property, the expansion, redevelopment, or reuse of which may be complicated by the presence or potential presence of a hazardous substance, pollutant, or contaminant." Currently in the United States there are more than 450,000 brownfields, which when improved have been shown to improve the surrounding environmental stress. Funding for these hazardous sites may be obtained through the EPA's Brownfields and Land Revitalization Program which empowers municipalities, landholders, and land developers to safely clean up and repurpose the land.

=== Non-infrastructure redevelopment ===
Land recycling can also include those spaces that are not within urbanized environments are involve a building. Agricultural reuse is a very important part of land reuse where an existing field might have been abandoned due to nutrient depletion, and can be developed into something else. In addition to this the redevelopment of underutilized land into parks, community gardens and open space reservoirs are also prominent.

=== Other terms ===
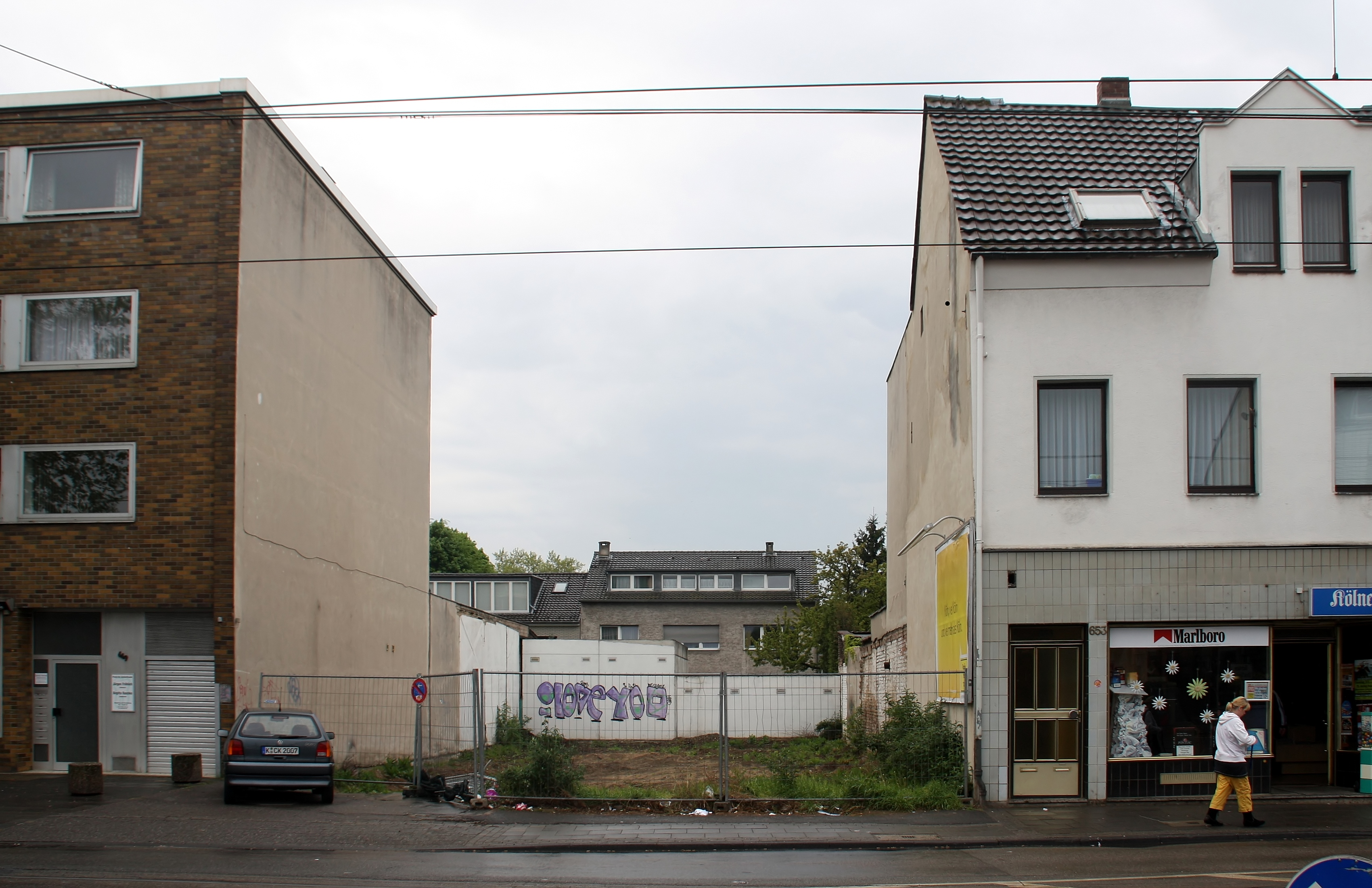
Example of a potential site for urban infill development

Other commonly used terms can relate to or serve as synonyms of land recycling:

- Infill development: development that takes place within existing communities, making maximum use of the existing infrastructure instead of building on previously undeveloped land;
- Sustainable development: Development that meets the needs of the present without compromising the ability of future generations to meet their own needs; and
- Brownfield development: development of real property for which its reuse may be complicated by the presence or potential presence of a hazardous substance, pollutant or contaminant.

== Benefits ==
=== Social and economic revitalization ===
Land recycling helps clean up and revitalize inner cities by returning abandoned, idle, or underused sites to productive use, bolstering community spirit, creating jobs and boosting local tax revenues.

The re-use of land revitalizes communities and renews economic activity, particularly in underserved urban areas. Abandoned, idled, and vacant properties often lie in former industrial and commercial areas, typically in urban and historically disadvantaged areas. These sites can be community eyesores, negatively impacting social and economic development, and often human and environmental health. The failure to redevelop brownfields in particular translates into potentially more exposure to toxins and the loss of economic and housing benefits that can come from appropriate redevelopment.

By putting these properties to new and productive use, land recycling encourages growth of businesses and services in such areas, helping to break up concentrations of poverty, creating jobs, and stimulating additional private investment and local tax revenue. An abandoned, well-situated, factory site can be cleaned up and redeveloped into a much-needed mixed-use development with a grocery store, senior housing, and access to public transportation. The addition of neighborhood-serving retail, affordable housing, or a clean public park in a disadvantaged community can boost local spirit and improve overall quality of life.

=== Alternative to sprawl ===
Land recycling increases density in urban areas by reducing urban sprawl and unplanned, low-density, automobile-dependent developments.

Sprawl development scatters housing, public transit, jobs and other amenities farther apart, demanding more frequent use of cars for travel. The increase in miles travelled by vehicles causes a range of health and environmental problems, including air pollution, increased greenhouse gas emissions, a larger occurrence of traffic jams, and asthma. This results in a lower quality of life for residents, ever-increasing commute times, and the health implications of smog.

By moving new jobs, economic opportunities and community amenities farther from established populations, sprawl development can cripple once-thriving cities. This trend takes a toll on the socio-economic health of urban communities as growth retreats from the urban center.

Rather than take advantage of existing infrastructure such as roads, public transit, and public works, building sprawl projects abandons these resources and demands further consumption of land and resources.

Land recycling provides a theoretically viable solution to urban sprawl by focusing on reusing essential infrastructure and public resources. This approach leads to the development of compact, full-service neighborhoods that could minimize the need for vehicle use and decrease reliance on carbon-based energy. Rebuilding in urban neighborhoods can, in theory generate reinvestment in vibrant economic and cultural centers, rather than drawing away much-needed resources. As daily commute times decrease due to proximity to urban centres, quality of life can also be increased.

=== Directing development to urban cores ===
Redirecting population growth and growth of businesses to already urbanized areas can help in the fostering of sustainable communities, as buildings are already near existing infrastructure and amenities, not requiring new infrastructure to be built as would be the case in greenfield development. Applying sustainable principles to land use and growth management requires that growth be redirected from scattered fringe areas back to our urban cores, where people, services and infrastructure already exist. Building up urban areas positively increases population density, providing the critical mass to support local services from coffee shops to grocery stores, public transit to libraries and symphony halls. Land recycling can also assist in the creation of affordable housing, as it increases housing stocks due to its use of land previously unused for residential purposes.

=== Addressing climate change ===
Land recycling effectively curbs greenhouse-gas emissions by encouraging smart, compact growth that reduces vehicle dependence. Redevelopment within an urban core reduces commuting distances and therefore average vehicle miles traveled (VMTs) by creating residential, office, and other amenities within proximity. Since transportation alone accounts for a third of greenhouse gases (GHGs) emitted in the United States, land recycling offers a key tool in any fight against climate change. A recent Urban Land Institute study found that compact urban developments reduce the number of vehicle miles traveled (VMTs) by 20 to 40 percent because users are closer to amenities and can more easily rely on public transportation. Smart urban planning is therefore crucial to maximizing energy savings and overall reduction of greenhouse gases.

=== Leaders in Energy and Environmental Design Certification ===
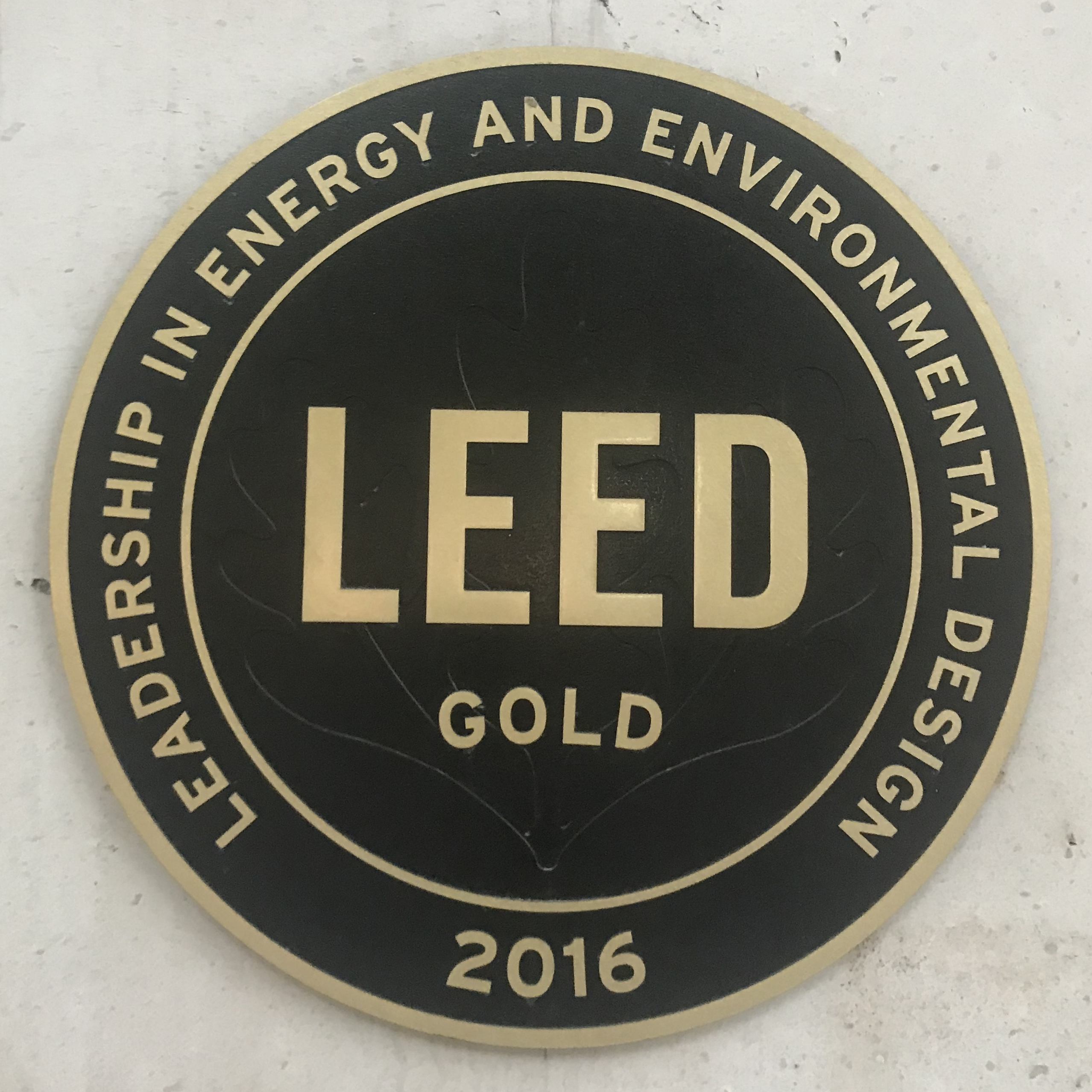
LEED Gold Plaque in a Certified Building

As of 2009 the green movement has started to emphasize the Leadership in Energy and Environmental Design (LEED) Green Building Rating System, a certification system that rewards the design, construction and operation of high-performance green buildings. LEED certification signifies incorporation of smart building design and technology to reduce energy use and minimize waste. However, even if a building is energy-efficient, the energy required to travel to and from a LEED-certified site may well exceed the energy saved through energy-efficient features. LEED-certified buildings and other developments best benefit climate change when they reuse infill sites and access existing resources.

LEED Certification can also benefit the occupant of the reused building. As sustainability becomes more prioritized within the building movement, having a LEED-certified building becomes more desirable. This certification may persuade public opinion and encourage more of the population to seek services by a company that prioritizes sustainability. In addition to this, some governmental bodies provide monetary benefits for prioritizing a sustainable site such as tax breaks and stipends.

== Sustainability ==
Sustainability involves meeting the needs of the present without compromising the ability of future generations to meet their own needs.

By encouraging recycling rather than the consumption of land, land recycling promotes smart growth and responsible, sustainable patterns of development. A 2001 study by George Washington University shows that for every acre of brownfield redeveloped, 4.5 acres (18,000 m^{2}) of undeveloped land is conserved. Public Policies and Private Decisions Affecting the Redevelopment of Brownfields: An Analysis of Critical Factors, Relative Weights and Areal Differentials. As most brownfields and other abandoned sites are typically situated in urban areas, they tap into existing nearby infrastructure, limiting the need to build new roads, gridlines, and amenities, thereby reducing further land consumption. Each infill development prevents sprawl into open space, forests and agricultural land, preserving acres of undeveloped land.

=== Sustainable land remediation and planning ===
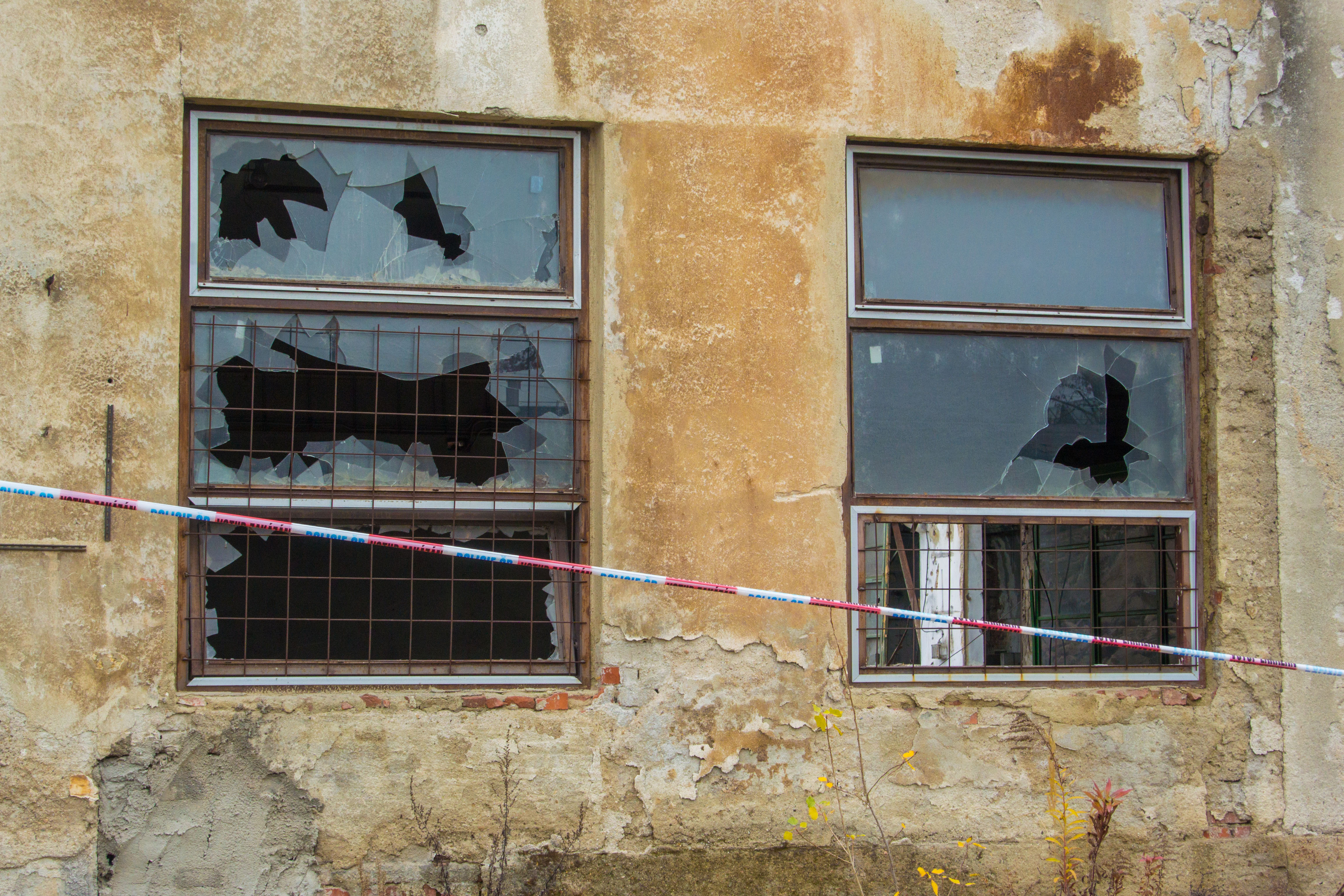
ZETOR building before demolition

Land development is an aspect of land recycling which involves urbanization and development of land, by reusing previously abandoned and unused land in commercial areas of larger cities. Sustainable remediation is an aspect of land development where there is an increased focus on the costs and benefits of certain aspects of land recycling. It aims to look at land remediation holistically considering not just the current environmental implications but also the long term social and economic implications. Co-design is much more intentional and focuses on a multitude of solutions by completing cost-benefit analyses, engaging in more inclusive conversations with stakeholders along with environmental impacts like energy and resources which may be consumed during land recycling projects. The Society of American Military Engineers have focused on using policy implemented by the American department of defense to ensure more sustainable practices. Looking more specifically some efforts being implemented by the S.A.M.E include the composition of a sustainability remediation tool which allows for estimates of specific technologies to be considered when analyzing land remediation. Planning and design for land development and transformation by using co-design has resulted in better shared information on systems. These have worked well on sustainable land development as well as improved communication and handling of barriers, ultimately creating a better integrated program on a global scale.

It has been used in cities in Australia as part of global urban research programs to create land remediation solutions. The overall process involves four phases which included co-design which resulted in outcomes for policy and practice, research and knowledge and solution development. In this case, the sustainable remediation framework was created and used to create better co-design processes starting small-scale locally and extending out to global scales. The process was split into three components starting with assisting in creating urban goals on each level of the scale which align with world views and influence, the policies which are in place and finally, to local technology and knowledge. Then shifting to look at how the urban goals affect urban systems like finances, environmental, and social capital as well as more physical systems like energy and water. Allowing better understanding of the costs and benefits of different land remediation goals. Then the process looks more long-term and focuses on the outcomes over time to understand the overarching effects of the implemented land remediation goals. Finally, the process looks at the major parts of the framework which need to be improved or need more focus.

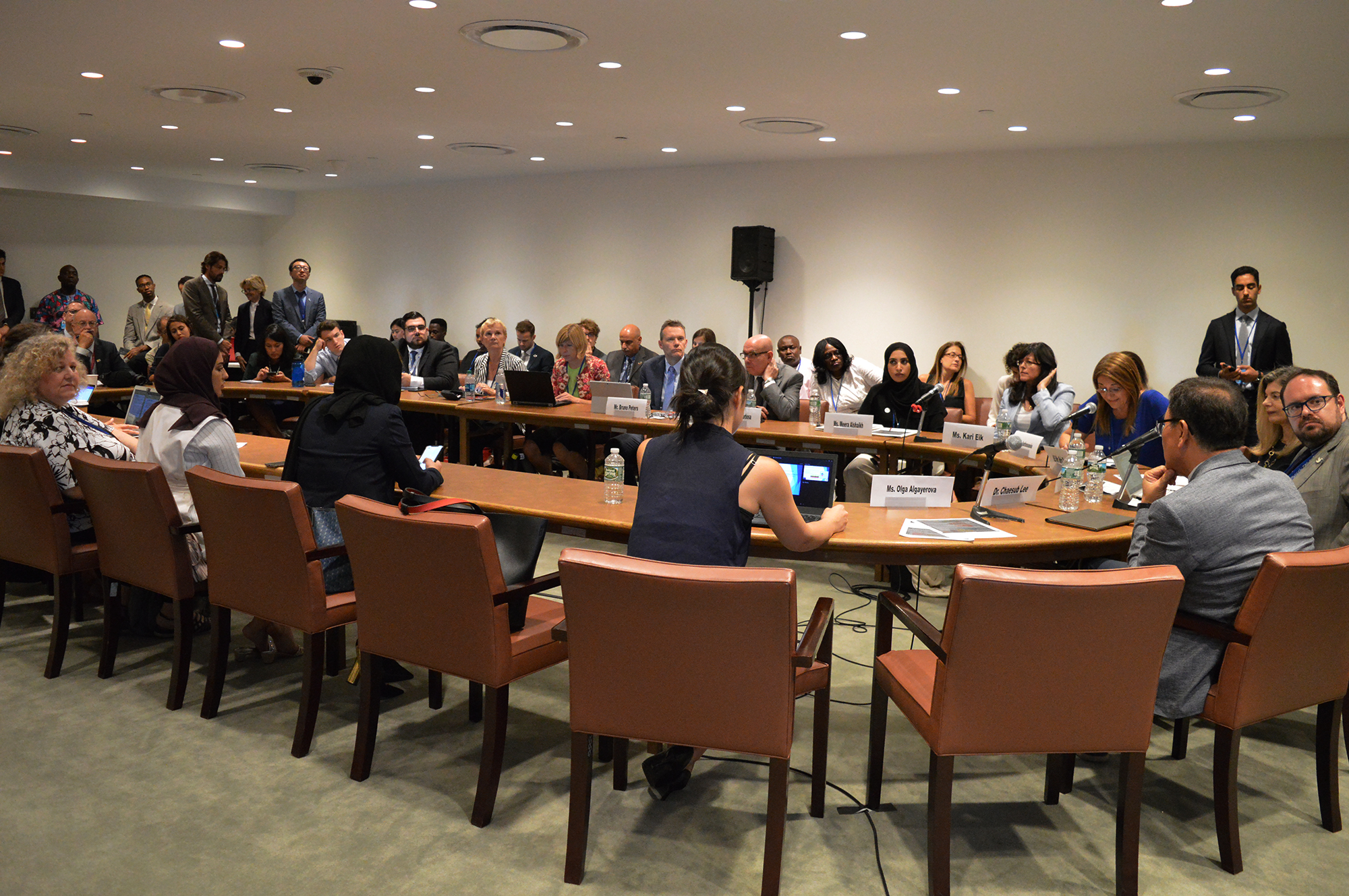
Participants in a 2018 meeting in New York City working on sustainable development for cities.

A push for sustainable land remediation can be seen all over the world when looking at urban planning and can also be connected to large public health scares or changes in social norms. In the UK after cholera outbreaks in the 19th century, people started to pay more attention to the way homes were being built and where they were being built. Now as urbanization has increased, the push is for using land which has already been partially or completely developed and transforming it into something different. The inclusion of garden cities, which are cities built with the intention of avoiding disrupting previously present natural ecosystems. An example is the Hampstead Garden Suburb which began formulating plans that focused on preservation of natural beauty in the area by avoiding the removal of plant life that was already there and working to build around it. This also spread to other countries in Europe with Germany building its first garden city in 1909 and Canberra in Australia where the main goal was to reestablish and maintain forest cover around the city. Later, Design with Nature written by Ian McHarg, influenced a lot of the sustainable development goals which were implemented all over the world.

In the US, a city beautification movement started in the early 20th century; many cities were redeveloped as part of the movement but Chicago was the most influenced. As the city was being physically improved they found that there was a need for more focus on development and its social implications. As time went on there were also more conversations about the influence that people have on their environment and more literature about the effects of environmental degradation became more mainstream. This allowed more intersectional land development goals to be implemented when looking at the different needs of people in different countries.

== Challenges ==
While land recycling has great economic and environmental benefits, without the right tools, skills, and knowledge, reusing land can produce certain challenges. Obstacles to redevelopment may include lack of funding and increased scrutiny. These can particularly impede projects on brownfields, which carry the stigma of contamination.

=== Market factors ===
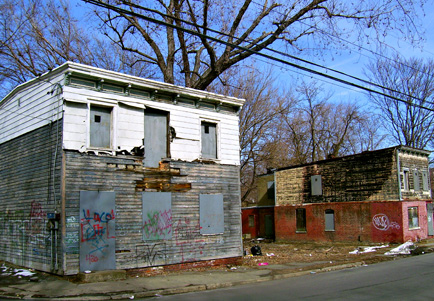
Urban blight in Newburgh, New York in 2006.

Because idled and underused infill sites are often located in distressed urban areas concerns arise about crime, safety, and access to quality education and services. These and other market factors frequently pull development to open land near traditionally desirable communities and away from urban infill sites.

==== Greenfields competition ====
Brownfields and infill sites must compete with attractive, undeveloped suburban and rural land, also called greenfield land. When considering the real or perceived risks and costs of land recycling, a greenfield development may seem more economically sensible as the immediate costs are typically less than developing on an infill or brownfield site. However, it is important to consider the long-term economic gain of land recycling and the added social and environmental rewards of sustainable development.

=== Brownfields ===
As defined by the US Environmental Protection Agency, a brownfield site is “real property, the expansion, redevelopment, or reuse of which may be complicated by the presence or potential presence of a hazardous substance, pollutant, or contaminant”. In other words, brownfield sites comprise abandoned, idled, or underused industrial and commercial facilities where expansion or redevelopment is complicated by real or perceived environmental contamination.

==== Brownfield remediation ====
Due to differences in regulation, production techniques, and heavy industrial use in the past, it is difficult to attract those willing to tackle the uncertainty and obstacles associated with potential cleanup. Sites that are contaminated can cause public health risks, including physical risks like uncovered holes, unsafe structures, and sharp objects. Past industrial activities can leave behind chemical contamination, and people may become exposed to these chemicals when entering the properties. Sites that have high levels of land contamination have a high cost of remediation. Nature-based solutions is an idea being talked about to produce a more environmentally friendly space. Nature-based solutions can be looked at as policies and approaches to environmental issues that are in benefit to human health and biodiversity. An example would include developing a permeable green area from these brownfield sites.

Phytoremediation is another environmentally friendly approach for brownfield remediation. Phytoremediation programs reduce contaminants in the soil, water and air through planting different types of plants. Important metals that are harmful to human health, such as selenium, zinc, nickel and iron, are removed from contaminated soil through this process. These procedures are inexpensive because the plants rely on sunlight and the recycled nutrients in the ground. Although phytoremediation cannot be used the same way in every destination due to different types of plants being nurtured differently in different types of environments. It depends on the soil, where the plant is placed, if it is getting enough nutrients to thrive, etc. The plants end up being so greatly polluted from heavy metals that they need to be disposed of. Thermal treatment is used as a disposal option. Thermal treatment involves the combustion of the waste materials through machines that produce high enough temperatures, which decompose the organic molecules within the plant. This treatment is typically used on the residential and industrial scale, making it useful for brownfield sites.

==== Uncertainty and costs ====
Assessing whether or not a site is contaminated can be a costly process that deters land reuse. Potential purchasers are often unwilling or unable to risk an investment in a site assessment for a property that may require cleanup they cannot afford. Even if a site has been purchased, concerns over cleanup costs may further stall redevelopment. Uncertainty over time, cost or a high price for cleanup leaves many brownfield sites in development limbo.

==== Project financing ====
Obtaining private front-end financing for brownfield cleanup can be a difficult process. Since financing is more readily available for development on greenfields, infill and brownfield sites are often passed over.

==== Environmental justice ====
The concern for contamination of new occupants of a redeveloped brownfield is a concern. Communities of color and low-income communities are disproportionately affected by pollution and brownfield sites offer a higher risk to the communities surrounding them. Many suggest that brownfield programs are a good alternative to the Superfund Act, but the standards of cleanup need to be highly considered in order to avoid future contamination.

=== Environmental-liability risks ===
Although recent changes in some countries' federal laws provide some liability relief to new purchasers of contaminated properties, the law remains very complex and many state laws still have strict liability covering real property. Thus, in many cases, any current or past property owner can potentially be legally and financially liable regardless of who is responsible for contamination. This liability web continues to throw a chill on many brownfield projects even in the presence of regulatory reforms designed to encourage redevelopment. A common belief among many brownfield owners is that it is less risky and cheaper to abandon or “mothball” a facility than to conduct a site assessment that could trigger large cleanup costs and potential liability.

==== Regulatory requirements ====
The potentially complex process of successfully redeveloping an infill site, particularly a brownfield, can challenge land recycling interest and proposals. Understanding and complying with federal, state, and local legal and regulatory requirements can be daunting for some property owners and developers. Guidance from legal specialists and environmental cleanup consultants is often needed to design, develop, and guide a project through the process of regulatory requirements and permitting approvals.

=== Gentrification ===
Because most communities with underutilized buildings are those in poverty, an existing company coming in and investing in reimagining it can raise a concern of gentrification. The new building can lead to wealthier people coming in and causing displacement of existing residents. Depending on the building occupancy, such as a new apartment complex charging a higher rent, this can drive for higher priced services to come in and eventually push out existing residents who can no longer afford to live in the area.

== Implementations ==
=== EU ===
An in-depth examination of land recycling in different countries shows many different perspectives on implementations of land recycling. The general European focus looked at land use in the EU and the importance of reducing new land use as well as reducing addition of impervious surface which disrupts natural ecosystems. Beginning with research, a database maintained by the Copernicus Programme is used in the EU to monitor land use changes, its main components are Corine Land Cover (CLC) and Urban Atlas (UA). Each of these has its own indicators for measuring increasing land use and increasing urbanization, for Corine Land Cover the flows of land recycling are split based on previously developed and undeveloped land because they each have different potential to produce green urban infrastructure. For the Urban Atlas database, the focus is the same but more geographically and theme specific accuracy so it used to test more of the land recycling indicators. The indicators were tested in all the countries in Europe from 1990 to 2002 in three sections, the tests were used to compare projections and determine the meaningfulness of land recycling using data from the CLC and UA datasets. The results of the data analysis showed little to no trends in land recycling and more variation in between the different European countries. The approach of the EU then focused more on the large scale environmental impacts of land recycling by quantification and identification of places where land use could be improved.

=== Germany ===
On a smaller scale, Germany focused on limiting the amount of land conversion specifically for settlement and traffic to 30 ha per day starting in 2002 as a part of the National Sustainability Strategy. They also incentivized urban development and improvement by making it easier for contractors to obtain permits to develop urban areas. Studies were done to see the effectiveness of the implementation of this policy by looking at Stralsund. The city was chosen for its ability to be developed as a mostly rural part of Germany as well as for its appeal for not only younger families looking for in expensive places to settle but also for companies looking for places to develop. The land development of Stralsund was then monitored from 1992 to 2018; the focus of development started with industrialization of the outskirts of the town, then brownfield transformation and finally, residential development.

Cost-benefit also played a big role in the conversion of pieces of land that hadn't been in use for a long period of time like a military property. As development continued, there was also compensation for interference with ecosystems and natural spaces by the addition of green spaces and by planting trees. When comparing both the old land use plan and the new land use plan, they found that the cost of the new had the potential to save 55% of costs, but ultimately there wasn't much change between the results of the old and the new land use plans. The application of an accelerated inner urban development plan was neither advantageous nor non-advantageous for Stralsund, Germany, because of the previous structure of the policy. The country of Germany also had goals to reach land degradation neutrality by 2030 by reaching its sustainable development goals specifically based on soil improvement.

Germany has focused a lot on brownfield development as much of Europe with that including not just contaminated land but also land which was previously developed. The push for target amounts of recycled land stems from status quo influence with other countries development of brownfield mitigation work. In Leipzig, Germany improvement of land and community quality was done by creating more urban forestry. With increased research of the people's response to the improved brownfields generally quality of life was improved. Some research shows that the greenspaces though positive needed to be made more usable for improvement of quality of life. Mainly stakeholders have a say in the way greenspace is allocated in Germany, so there is more of a push to ensure policy matches with what is beneficial for the people who would be using greenspaces not just in Germany but in other European countries.

=== United States ===
==== Pennsylvania ====
In Pennsylvania a land recycling program was established to promote the voluntary cleanup and reuse of contaminated sites. This program was established in 1995 and is also known as the Voluntary Cleanup Program. This program aims to set four main standards; the first is to set structured standards. This allows for public knowledge of the cost of cleaning up a site, and ensures the protection of the present and future use of the site. The second standard is granted liability relief. The third standard promotes transparency by giving specific time frames for cleanups and routine reporting of what is being done on the site. Lastly, the fourth standard for this land recycling program is providing financial assistance for cleanups.

==== Ghirardelli Square ====
Ghirardelli Square is in San Francisco, California and is the center of many examples of land recycling and building reuse. Designed by Lawrence Halprin and William Wurster and opening in 1964, this was one of the first examples of major land recycling in the United States. Surrounding this square is many buildings and waterfront properties that were originally used for the production of local goods as well as transportation through the bay. No longer needed for their original uses, these buildings have been transformed and retrofitted to accommodate the needs of the community and attract tourism.

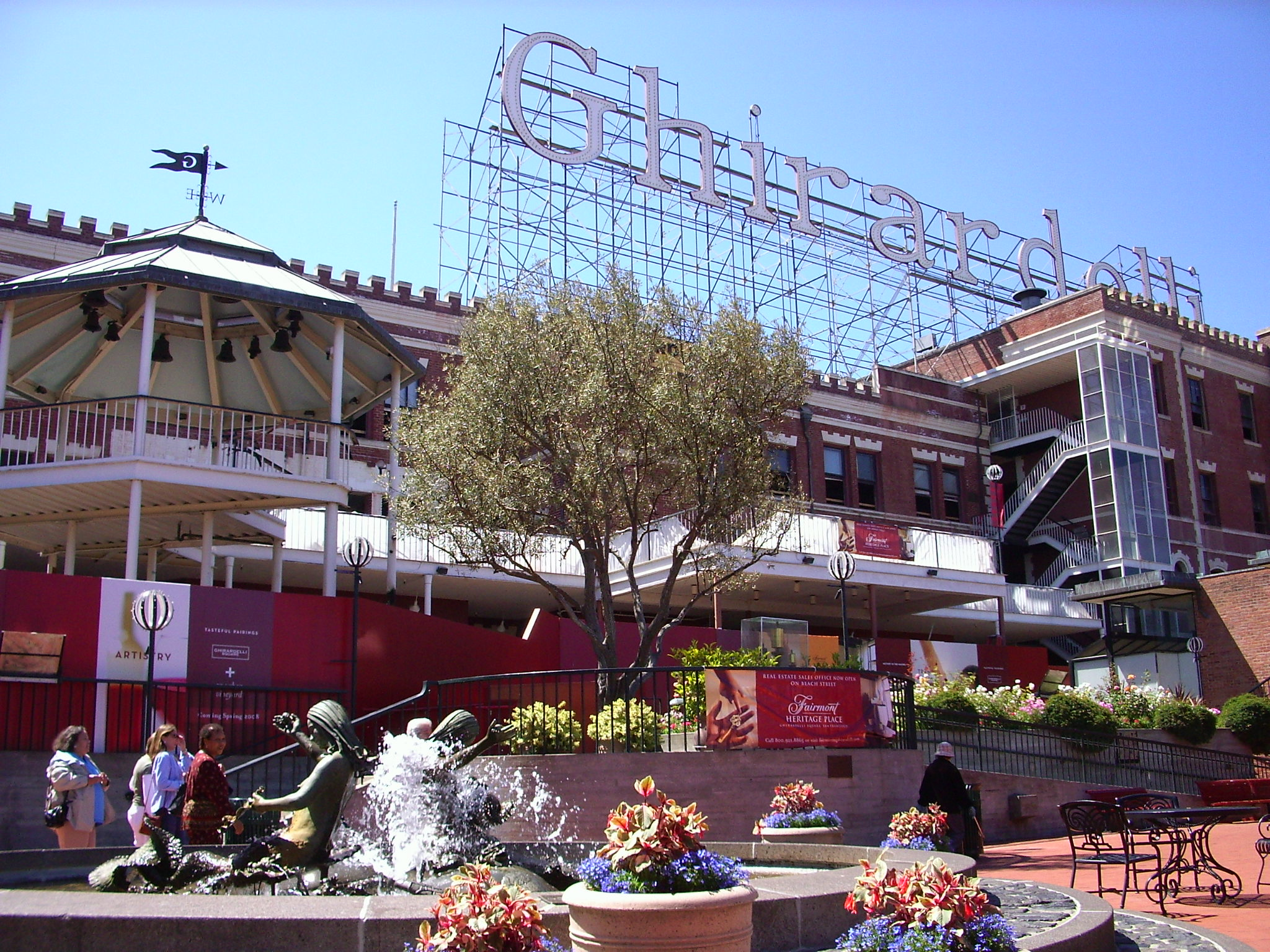
Ghirardelli Square

The inclusion of new retail spaces, offices, and residential properties in these existing abandoned buildings not only puts to use otherwise empty spaces but also prevents the erection of new structures and therefore uses fewer materials, energy, and land. In addition to this, Ghirardelli Square also shows the change of building use to reflect the needs of the residents. Churches specifically have changed from predominantly Christian to other religious uses or converted into secular uses such as housing and businesses.

==== Foundation Hotel ====
The Foundation Hotel in Detroit, Michigan is an Adaptive reuse project designed by local firm McIntosh Poris Associates (MPA) in collaboration with Simone Deary Design group. This project actually combined two adjacent buildings that were not in use. The main building was built in 1929 and originally housed the city's oldest fire department. The additional building was once home to Pontchartrain Wine Cellars. In 2013 the fire department moved out and the building was left unoccupied for over a year until bought by Aparium Hotel Group.

This project focused on the new needs of the community while still preserving the aesthetic and incorporated Historic preservation in their work. This is significant because as stated above, gentrification can be a major negative effect during land recycling and the attempt to maintain the existing exterior of the building counteracts this.

==== Wonder Bread Factory ====
Washington, D.C.'s Wonder Bread Factory sat in the Shaw neighborhood from early 1913 to the mid-1980s in full production. After the company moved out of the space the building was abandoned and vacant for almost 20 years until Douglas Development, founded by Douglas Jemal, bought it in 1997. The building sat vacant for another 15 years until it was redeveloped and converted into offices in 2013.

This building's history was preserved by minimizing the level of exterior renovation as much as possible while still creating a new use for a space that was highly needed in the community. This building is 98,000 square feet and is now loft-style offices available to the public.

== See also ==
- Bioremediation
- Environmental design
- Green development
- Green infrastructure
- Green urbanism
- Land banking
- Land development
- Land reclamation
- Land rehabilitation
- Leadership in Energy and Environmental Design
- New Urbanism
- Street reclamation
- Superfund
- Sustainable architecture
- Sustainable city
- Sustainable design
- Sustainable development
- Urban planning
