= Sustainable remediation =

Mode of approaching potentially contaminated land and groundwater

Sustainable Remediation is a term adopted internationally and encompasses sustainable approaches, as described by the Brundtland Report, to the investigation, assessment and management (including institutional controls) of potentially contaminated land and groundwater. Sustainable remediation brings together the concepts of remediation with the practice of sustainability. This field is quickly expanding with new research coming out frequently.

== Definition ==
The process of identifying sustainable remediation is defined by The UK Sustainable remediation Forum as "the practice of demonstrating, in terms of environmental, economic and social indicators, that the benefit of undertaking remediation is greater than its impact, and that the optimum remediation solution is selected through the use of a balanced decision-making process." This approach is focused on mitigating environmental damage caused by factors like soil degradation, atmospheric pollution, and water contamination in a cost effective, and realistic way. This process can take shape in a wide variety of forms since there is a large range of different remediation projects required to address the critical needs of ecosystems; in fact it is estimated that there are 5 million brown field sites that are in need of remediation, internationally. In the US alone, there are more than 450,000 brown field sites that require significant reinvestment due to years of toxic contamination and/or degradation.

== Approach ==
Sustainable remediation is the practice of considering the effects of implementing an environmental cleanup and incorporating options to minimize the footprint of the cleanup actions. Opportunities for green and sustainable practices exist throughout the site remediation process of remedial investigation, design, construction, operation, and monitoring. Five core elements are evaluated as part of the environmental footprint analysis including 1) energy, 2) air and atmosphere, 3) materials and waste, 4) land and ecosystem, and 5) water. The cleanup remedy is evaluated for each core element to 1) minimize total energy use and maximize renewable energy use, 2) minimize air pollutants and greenhouse gas emissions, 3) minimize water use and impacts to water resources, 4) reduce, reuse, and recycle materials and waste, and 5) minimize land use and protect ecosystems.

== History ==
The sustainable remediation industry emerged in Europe and the United States in the 1970s and 1980s with notable restoration projects like the Love Canal Superfund site. Projects like this and increased regulations in Europe led to the eventual creation of several professional groups such as the Network for Industrially Contaminated Land in Europe (NICOLE, founded in 1995 in Europe) and the Sustainable Remediation Forum (SuRF, founded in 2006 in the United States). Since their creation these organizations have released many publications on the topic and have promoted the use of sustainable remediation. While in some cases the restoration projects were initiated due to grassroots community efforts, governmental action has also played an increasingly important role. Advocacy groups have been working with governmental agencies like the EPA to pass legislation, especially after a landmark 1990 court decision (United States v. Fleet Factors Corp) which found that corporations and their creditors can be held liable for property contamination. Additionally, over the last two decades governing bodies like the European Union have taken up initiatives on Sustainable Remediation.

== Barriers to sustainable remediation ==
There are a few different barriers to sustainable remediation. These barriers include health and safety while working on site, and the effectiveness of the remedy. As one might expect, cleaning up sites that have hazardous waste on them can be dangerous if the proper precautions are not taken. Well intended efforts (e.g., dam removals or excavation of chemical containers) can disrupt ecosystems further and potentially release additional contaminants that have been relatively undisturbed for decades. The effectiveness of the remedy is an important factor when considering a remediation project. Different methods have been used throughout the last few decades on remediation projects with varying levels of success. Certain treatments like pump and treat, and dig and haul can, in certain situations, have some long lasting unintended effects upon the environment that are more detrimental than helpful in some situations. Additional barriers to sustainable remediation involve cost and political opposition. In many cases, remediating severely compromised sites is expensive and time-consuming, requiring extensive resources and a long-term commitment on the part of municipalities and/or developers. These costs can be amplified by the uncertain scope of work that they can entail. In the US, this work is driven, in part, by federal legislation, including the Clean Air Act, Clean Water Act, the Superfund Act, and the Pollution Prevention Act. While the issue of remediation remains a global priority, new deregulatory proposals issued by the Trump administration make the future of sustainable remediation in the US less certain.

== Current practices in the field of sustainable remediation ==
Over the last decade, many new methodologies in the field of sustainable remediation have developed, but there are two main types of treatments: in-situ treatments and ex-situ treatments. In-situ treatments, generally speaking, are applied to the contaminated area without removing the contaminant first. These treatments include things like bioremediation, the creation of passive barriers, and sustainable immobilization. Ex-situ treatments usually involve removing contaminated material off site, and either disposing of it, or treating it and returning the cleaned contaminate to its original location. This method is generally used when the contaminate needs to be isolated or when more extensive remediation needs to happen. Ex-situ methods include things like dredging, pump and treat, and dig and haul. While these methods are generally more invasive, they are also very effective when there is dangerous contamination on site. Both methods are important, and a wide variety of new treatments are currently being developed. These new techniques include methods like emerging forms of in-situ chemical treatments, electroactive biochar systems, and soil flushing coupled with aminated-nanocellulose/MOF hydrogel nanocomposites adsorbents. Techniques like these are much more environmentally friendly than more traditional ex-situ methods, and can greatly increase the benefits of remediation. In fact some of these newer techniques have shown to reduce the life-cycle greenhouse gas emissions by between 50 and 80 percent. While these numbers are exciting there is still much work to be done, and the long-term impacts, and robustness of some of these methods still need to be better understood and researched.

== See also ==
- Sustainable development
- Land recycling
