= Parkhead railway station =

Railway station in Glasgow, Scotland

Parkhead railway station can refer to one of several passenger (or passengers and goods) railway stations in the Parkhead area of Glasgow, Scotland:

== Those with Parkhead in the station name ==
- The ex-NBR Parkhead station, subsequently renamed Parkhead North railway station (closed)
- The ex-Cal Parkhead station, subsequently renamed Parkhead Stadium railway station (closed)
- Parkhead Forge Siding (closed)

== Those without Parkhead in the station name ==
- Alexandra Parade railway station
- Bridgeton railway station
- Bridgeton Goods (closed)
- Camlachie Goods (closed)
- Dalmarnock railway station
- Duke Street railway station
- Haghill Goods (closed)
- Kennyhill Goods (closed)
- London Road Goods (closed)

== Sources ==
- Jowett, Alan (March 1989). Jowett's Railway Atlas of Great Britain and Ireland: From Pre-Grouping to the Present Day (1st ed.). Sparkford: Patrick Stephens Ltd. p. 20A. ISBN 978-1-85260-086-0. OCLC 22311137.
- Quick, Michael (2023) [2001]. Railway passenger stations in Great Britain: a chronology (PDF). version 5.05. Railway & Canal Historical Society. p. 357.
