= Celtic Park =

Football stadium in Glasgow, Scotland

- "Parkhead" "Paradise"
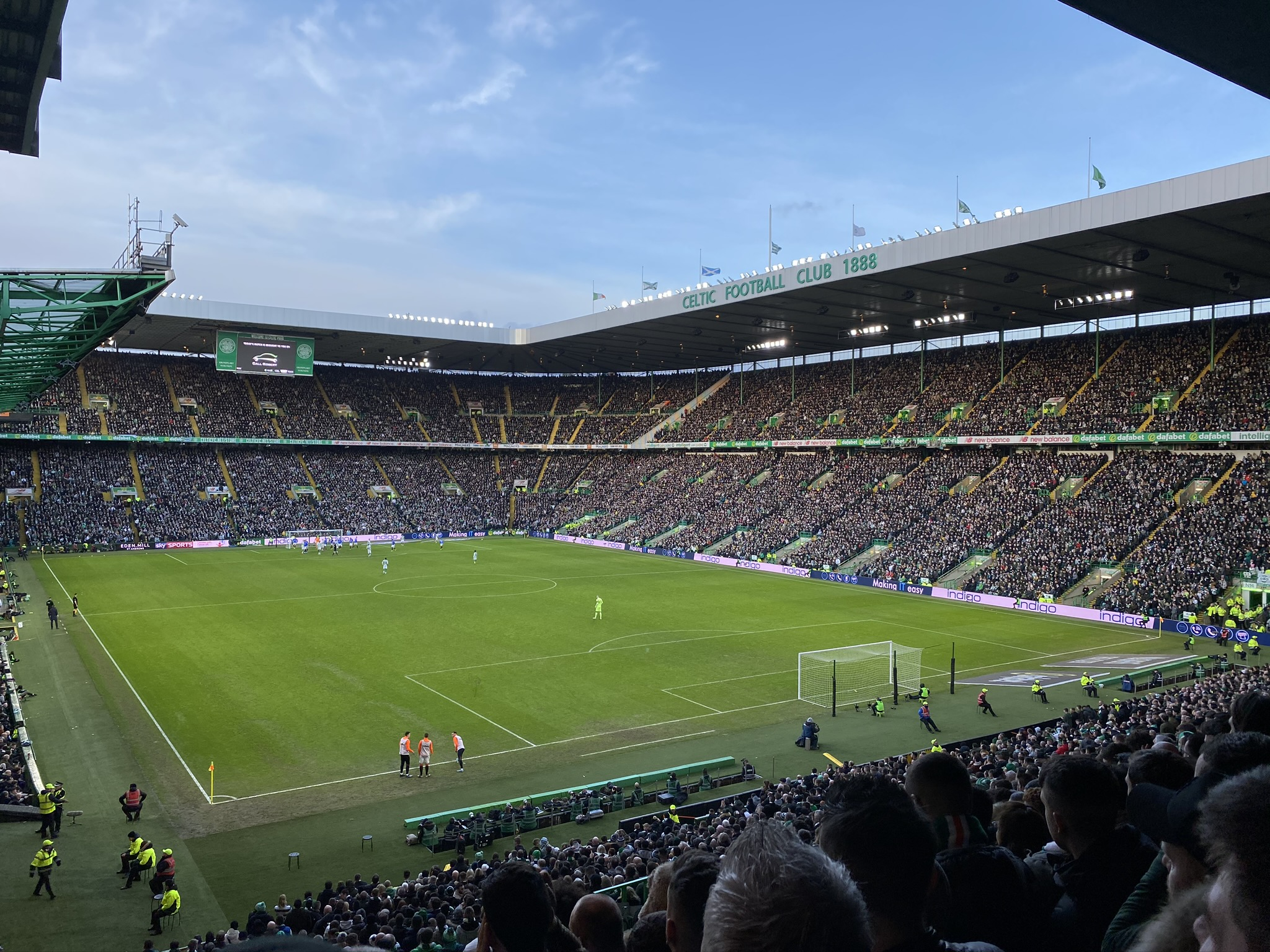
- UEFA

- Location in Glasgow
- Location: London Road; Parkhead, Glasgow, Scotland
- Coordinates: 55°50′59″N 4°12′20″W
- Owner: Celtic (1897–present)
- Capacity: 60,411
- Surface: Desso Grass Hybrid (2017–present)
- Record attendance: 83,500 v Rangers; 1 January 1938
- Field size: 114 x 74 yards (104.2 x 67.7 metres)
- Public transit: Dalmarnock

Construction
- Opened: 20 August 1892
- Renovated: 1994–98
- Cost: £35,628 (Main Stand, 1929) £40M (1994–98 rebuild)
- Architects: Duncan and Kerr (Main Stand, 1929); Percy Johnson-Marshall Associates (1994–98 rebuild)

Tenant
- Celtic: 1892–present

Celtic Park is a football stadium and the home of Scottish Premiership team Celtic, in the Parkhead area of Glasgow, Scotland. With a capacity of 60,411, it is the largest football stadium in Scotland, and the eighth-largest football stadium in the United Kingdom. It is often known as Parkhead, and nicknamed Paradise.

Celtic was formed in 1887 and the first Celtic Park opened in Parkhead in 1888. The club moved to the current site in 1892, after the rental charge was greatly increased on the first. The new site was developed into an oval-shaped stadium, with vast terracing sections. The record attendance of 83,500 was set at an Old Firm derby on 1 January 1938. (Note: Newspaper reports at the time indicate that the officially returned attendance was given as 83,500, with an estimated further 10,000 supporters locked out of the ground for safety reasons. However, the ground's capacity was gauged at the time as being around 88,000 and several subsequent sources (including the club's official website) have since revised the attendance up to 92,000.) The terraces were covered and floodlights installed between 1957 and 1971. The Taylor Report mandated that major clubs should have all-seater stadia by August 1994. Celtic was in a poor financial position in the early 1990s and no major work was carried out until Fergus McCann took control of the club in March 1994. The old terraces were demolished to develop a new stadium in a phased rebuild completed in August 1998. A section of rail seating was installed in 2016.

Celtic Park has been used as a venue for Scotland internationals and cup finals when Hampden Park has been unavailable. Before the First World War, Celtic Park hosted composite rules shinty-hurling, track and field and the 1897 Track Cycling World Championships. Open-air Masses and First World War recruitment drives were also held there. Celtic Park hosted the opening ceremony of the 2014 Commonwealth Games and has also been used for concerts by the Who and U2.

== History ==
=== Original Celtic Park (1888–1892) ===
Celtic was formed in November 1887. The original Celtic Park was built at the north east junction of Springfield Road and London Road in Parkhead by a volunteer workforce within six months of formation. Its opening game was a match between Hibernian and Cowlairs. Celtic played its first match on 28 May 1888 at Celtic Park, against Rangers, which Celtic won 5–2. It hosted a British Home Championship match between Scotland and Ireland on 28 March 1891. Celtic was forced to leave this site in 1892, however, when the landlord increased the annual rent from £50 to £450.

=== New Celtic Park (1892–1904) ===
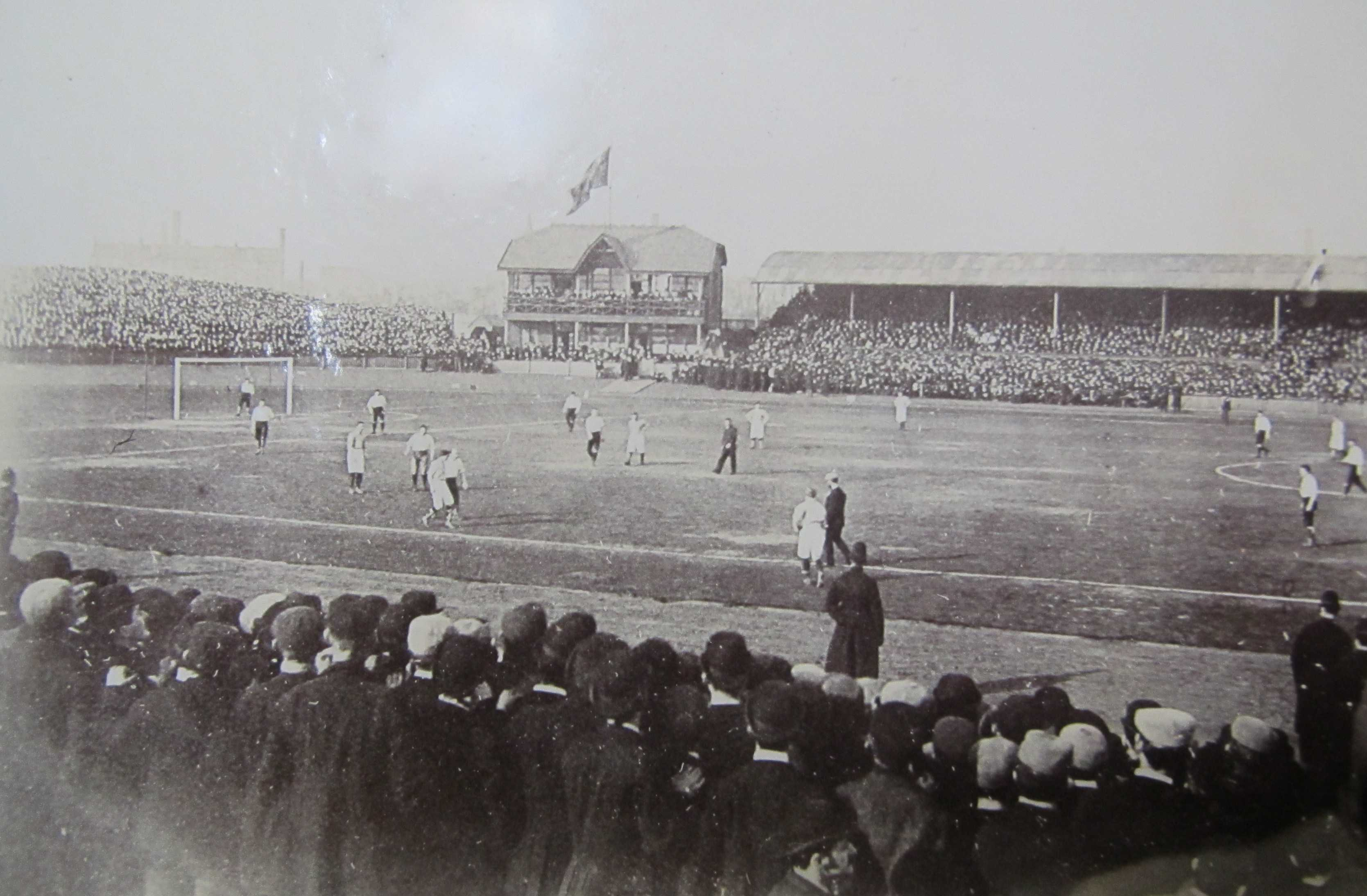
Celtic Park in the 1890s. This picture shows the pavilion and adjacent stand (the latter destroyed by fire in 1904)

The new stadium was built in a disused brickyard at Janefield Street, 200 yards from the old site. The first turf, which had been transported from County Donegal, was laid by Irish patriot Michael Davitt and planted with shamrocks. He recited a verse that said the turf would "take root and flourish", but it was stolen soon afterwards. A journalist said the move was like "leaving the graveyard to enter paradise", which led to the ground being nicknamed "Paradise". The new Celtic Park was opened on 20 August 1892 with a match against Renton. A journalist writing in the Athletic News described Celtic Park as the best ground in Britain at the time, a title for which it may only have been challenged by Goodison Park, the home of Everton. Celtic Park was immediately successful, attracting record gate receipts and an attendance of 45,107 for the Scotland v England game in the 1894 British Home Championship. Celtic purchased the site for £100,000 in 1897.

The new stadium initially consisted of terracing with a capacity of approximately 40,000. It was an elongated oval shape, similar to Hampden Park. A running track and concrete cycling track were also constructed around the periphery of the pitch. On the northern side of the pitch there was a pavilion and a seated stand. An experimental floodlit football game was played on Christmas Day 1893. This was unsuccessful due to the ball repeatedly striking the lamps, which were hung over the pitch by wiring. In 1894, Celtic built the first ever press box at a football stadium in Britain, located high up on the main stand at Celtic Park. Later in the 1890s, club director James Grant financed the construction of an enclosed windowed stand (completed in 1899), built on stilts on the south side of the pitch. The spectators watched through sliding windows from padded seats, but they had to climb four flights of stairs to reach their position and the windows frequently steamed up.

=== Fire and rebuilding (1904–1957) ===
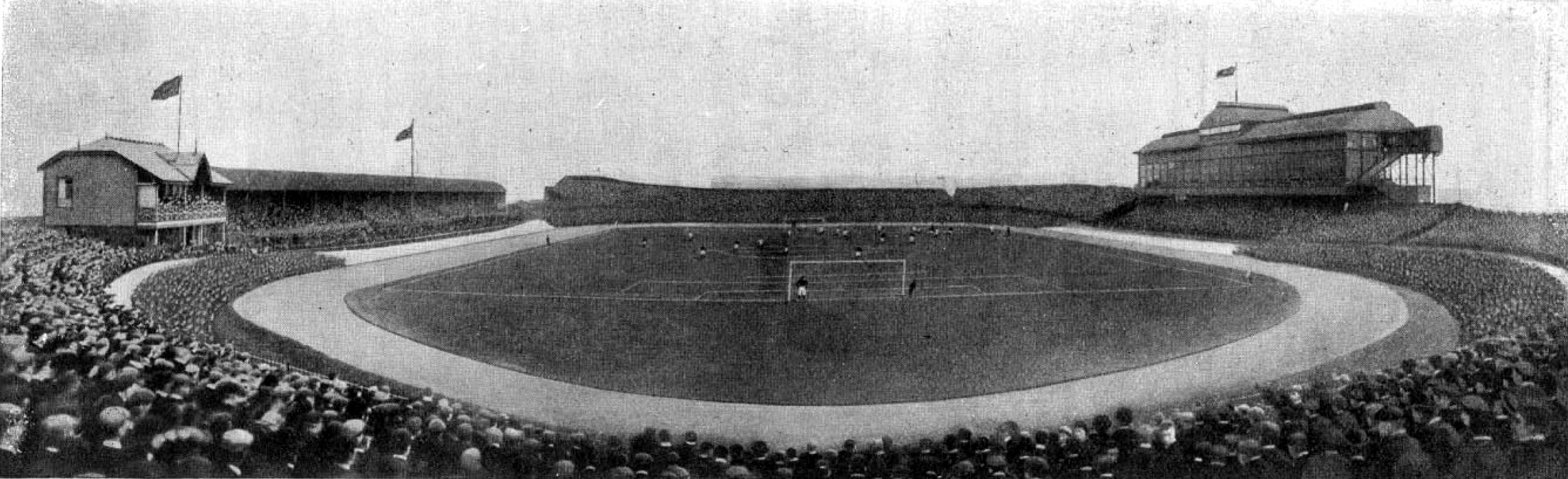
The stadium in 1906

In May 1904, a fire destroyed the older north grandstand and severely damaged the adjacent pavilion; this prompted Celtic to buy the newer Grant Stand outright. The north enclosure was rebuilt by the following year.

By 1927, the Grant Stand had become unsafe and was demolished, to be replaced in summer 1929 by a new single-tier Main Stand, designed by Duncan and Kerr. This stand, which cost £35,000 and provided 4,800 seats, was smaller and less ornate than the Main Stand at Ibrox. The Celtic Park main stand had a similar feature to Ibrox, however, in the pedimented roof gable over the press box. Prior to its completion, the old pavilion on the opposite side of the field which dated from the original construction of the ground in 1892 and had partly escaped the 1904 fire (it had been 'reduced to cinders' in that blaze according to hastily filed contemporary reports) burned down entirely in March 1929, destroying some of the club's old records and photographs (the trophies were stored elsewhere). The club had to play the rest of their matches in the 1928–29 season at nearby Shawfield Stadium (reciprocating an earlier arrangement in 1914 when Clyde suffered similar damage to their ground) and also had to replace the roof of the stand next to the pavilion, which then became known as the "Hayshed".

Although it was only the third biggest ground in Glasgow, the rebuilt Celtic Park had a greater capacity than any club stadium in England. The record attendance for a Celtic match at Celtic Park was set by an Old Firm derby against Rangers on New Year's Day 1938. Some sources give the attendance for this game as 92,000, but contemporary sources suggest that the attendance was approximately 83,500.

=== Stadium improvements (1957–1990) ===
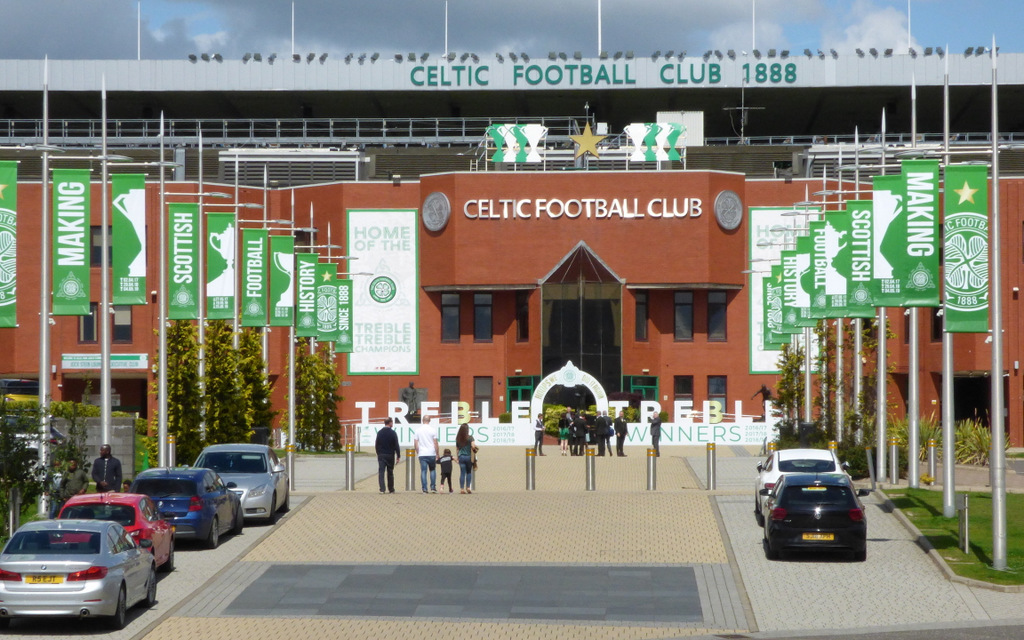
Main entrance to Celtic Park

Significant improvements were carried out between 1957 and 1971, partly due to the great success Celtic achieved under the management of Jock Stein. A roof was built over the back of the western "Celtic End" terrace in 1957, while floodlights were installed in 1959. They were first used on 12 October, in a friendly match against Wolves. The northern "Hayshed" terrace, which became known as the "Jungle", was concreted in 1966 and a new roof was erected. A roof was built over the eastern "Rangers End" terrace in 1967, using the same design as the Rangers End at Hampden Park. All of this work meant that Celtic had more covered terracing than any other stadium in Britain, except Wembley. There were 4,800 seats, all in the Main Stand, in an overall capacity of 80,000. A further 3,900 seats were installed in the Main Stand paddock area in 1971. A new roof was erected over the Main Stand in 1971, which cost £250,000. It was supported by a "goalpost" framework, with the top girder measuring 97.5 metres long. The design was flawed, however, as the roof provided little shelter to the paddock seats, and retractable columns had to be installed to provide stability in case of high winds or heavy snow. Celtic later sued the designers and won damages.

The regulations in the Safety of Sports Grounds Act 1975 reduced the capacity of Celtic Park to 56,500, but the club then increased the terracing to raise capacity to 67,000. In 1986, £1 million was spent on replacing the western terrace roof with a replica of the eastern terrace, which had been designed nearly twenty years earlier. The original red brick facade to the Main Stand was replaced during the club's centenary year in 1988, while lounges and offices were installed. Although the Main Stand had been modernised, terracing was still predominant at Celtic Park. This stood in contrast to most other major stadia in Britain, particularly Ibrox, where seating capacities had been increased. This left Celtic badly placed when the Taylor Report mandated that all major clubs had to have an all-seater stadium.

=== Proposed moves and redevelopment as all-seated stadium (1990–1994) ===
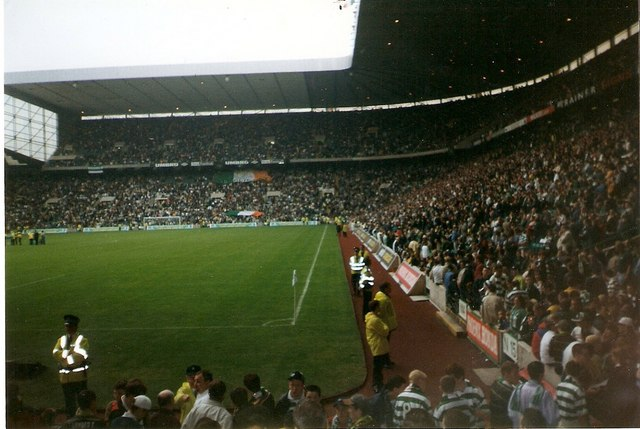
Celtic Park on 9 May, 1988, the day Celtic won the 1997–98 Scottish Premier Division

Celtic was heavily in debt and had been significantly outgrown by Rangers commercially in the early 1990s. The Celtic board initially prevaricated in response to the Taylor Report, partly due to divisions in the board. Celtic director Brian Dempsey proposed a development on land he controlled at Robroyston, but he was opposed by fellow directors, Michael Kelly and Chris White, who had Dempsey removed from the board. Despite these divisions, a proposal to build a new 52,000-seat stadium on industrial waste ground at Cambuslang was unveiled in April 1992. The £100 million scheme was meant to include wider commercial developments that would fund the completed stadium, which would have only provided 32,000 seats in a first phase of construction. There was scepticism about the plan, however, as it was unclear how Celtic or their partner in the project, Superstadia, would raise the necessary finance. The proposed site would have had to be decontaminated, and contradictory statements about the ownership structure of the development were issued. Outline planning permission was granted in May 1993.

A deadline of August 1994 had been set to convert all major grounds to be fully seated. Even with planning permission granted, the first phase of the Cambuslang scheme would not be ready until 1995. As a stop-gap measure, Celtic installed 5,033 seats in the Jungle at the end of the 1992–93 season, at a cost of £350,000. The board hoped Celtic would be given a special dispensation from the rules. Installing seats in the Jungle itself caused an emotional reaction. Due to redevelopment work at Hampden, the 1993 Scottish Cup final between Rangers and Aberdeen was to be played at Celtic Park. This meant that in the last competitive game in front of the Jungle, it would have been occupied by Rangers fans. To give the Celtic supporters last use, a friendly match between veteran Celtic and Manchester United players was arranged.

During the 1993–94 season, the board continued to talk optimistically about their plans. They claimed in February to have £20 million of funding in place from Gefinor, a Swiss financial institution. The claim was denied by Gefinor, who denied that they had even had any contact with the club. Celtic then came under severe pressure from the Bank of Scotland, who demanded a £1 million reduction in the club's overdraft, placing the club under threat of bankruptcy. With minutes to spare before a deadline set by the Bank, the board capitulated and sold control to Scots-Canadian businessman Fergus McCann.

=== Redevelopment (1994–2011) ===
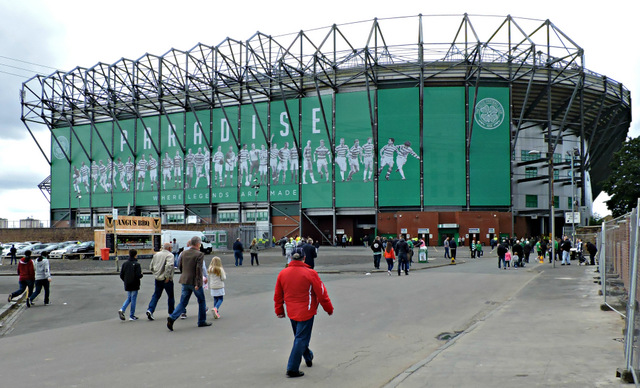
The Lisbon Lions Stand at Celtic Park

McCann quickly discarded the Cambuslang scheme and instead started plans to bring Celtic Park into compliance with the Taylor Report. The capacity would have been only 34,000 if seats had been installed in the remaining terraces, which nevertheless was greater than Celtic's average attendance in the previous six seasons. McCann, who believed the club could fill a much larger stadium, decided instead to effectively build a new stadium. In the summer of 1994, the Jungle, East Terracing and West Terracing were demolished, with only the structure of the Main Stand left intact. The relatively new Jungle seats were used to refresh the seating in the Main Stand. Celtic played their home games at Hampden Park during the 1994–95 season, which cost the club £500,000 in rent. Celtic raised over £26 million to fund the work from two share issues: £12.3 million in a rights issue (£9.4 million invested by McCann) and £14 million in a public offering. 10,000 ordinary fans bought into the public offering, while season ticket sales rose from 7,000 to 26,000.

The detailed plans were finalised in December 1994. The club intended to build a 60,000-seat stadium, to be completed in three phases. The first phase was the new North Stand, which was designed by Percy Johnson-Marshall Associates, engineered by Hutter Jennings Titchmarsh, and built by Miller Construction. Celtic Park reopened with a friendly against Newcastle on 5 August 1995, with the new 26,970-capacity North Stand and the existing 7,850-capacity Main (South) Stand in place. This was augmented by a temporary stand, holding 2,800 seats, on the site of the former West Terracing. Phase two of the redevelopment was completed in August 1996, with the opening of the 13,006-capacity East Stand. Phase 3a was completed in February 1998 with the opening of the South West Corner. This was followed by Phase 3b, the Jock Stein Stand on the former West Terracing site, which was opened in August 1998 with a match against Liverpool. This third phase added another 13,006 seats, bringing the total capacity of the new Celtic Park to 60,411. Phases 2 and 3 were built by Barr Construction. The whole redevelopment, which made Celtic Park the biggest club stadium in Britain, cost £40 million. In the 1998–99 season the average attendance was 59,224 and season ticket sales exceeded 53,000, the highest number in Britain at the time.

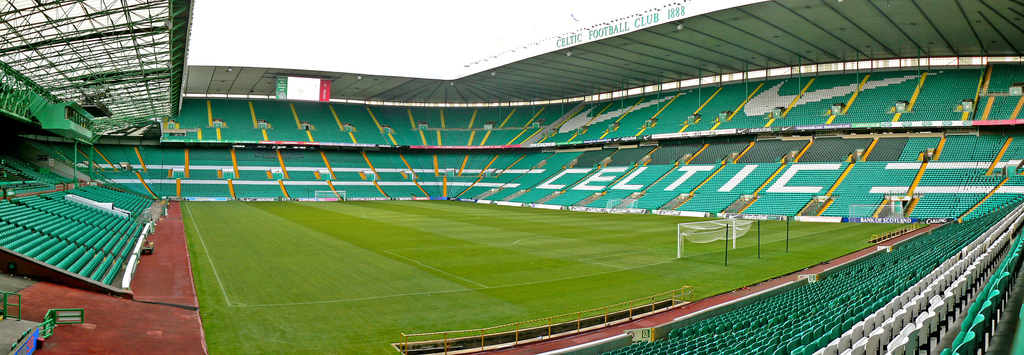
A panorama of the redeveloped Celtic Park taken in 2006

=== Safe standing (2011–present) ===
In September 2011, Celtic started a feasibility study into creating a safe standing section in Celtic Park. In June 2015, Celtic received safety approval for a proposal to install rail seating. A section of 2,975 rail seats was installed in the Lisbon Lions Stand during the 2016 close season.

== Structure and facilities ==
=== Stadium design ===
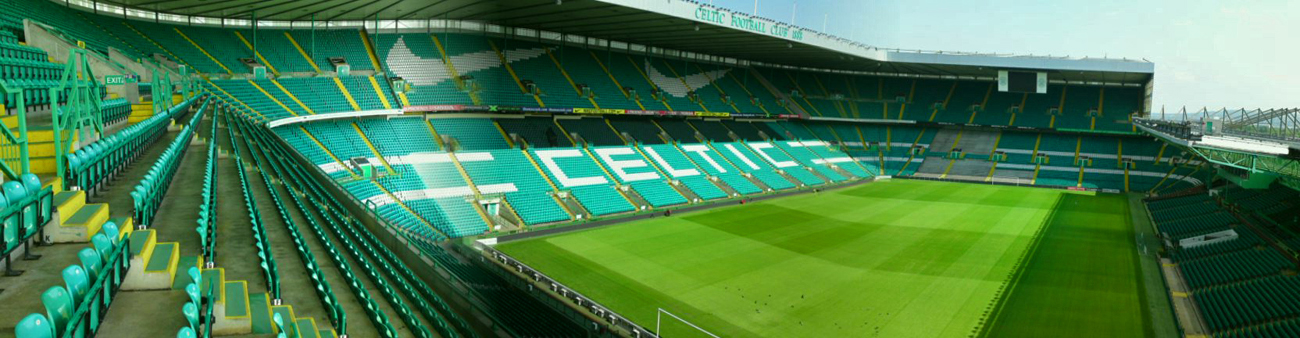
Interior view showing the stadium design of Celtic Park

Celtic Park was an oval stadium, but has been converted to a rectangular stadium. It is intended to create an enclosed and intimidating atmosphere for big games. The ground is split into four sections, officially known as the North, Jock Stein, Lisbon Lions and Main stands. The North, Jock Stein and Lisbon Lions stands form a continuous two tier shape enclosing three sides of the stadium. The two end stands (Jock Stein and Lisbon Lions) each have a capacity of 13,000, while the North Stand holds 27,000. The Main Stand holds just under 8,000, giving a total capacity of 60,411. It received 60% of the votes when BBC Radio 5 Live conducted a poll in 2002 to find the favourite sports venue in the United Kingdom.

=== Stands ===
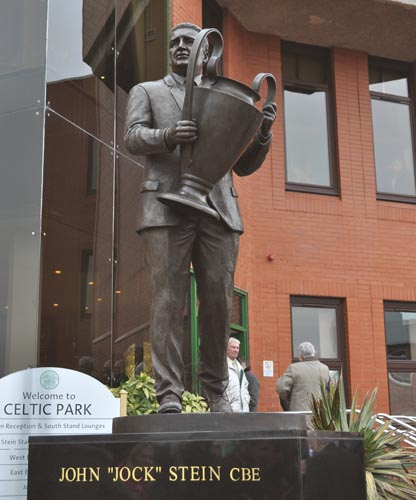
Bronze statue of Jock Stein (1922–1985) outside stadium, by sculptor John McKenna.

The North Stand is squeezed into a tight space between the pitch and the Eastern Necropolis cemetery. Part of the upper tier is cantilevered over the graveyard. To save at least £1 million of additional steelwork, fourteen internal pillars were installed to support the roof. Some local residents objected to the North Stand because of the shadow cast over the cemetery, which Celtic believed was necessary to complete the overall project. The proposals were passed because the local officials felt that Celtic had come up with the best solution possible to the problem. Celtic paid £10,000 to compensate residents who had been promised open space "from the centre of the earth to the sky". The structure also had to take account of the need to maintain access into the North Stand along Janefield Street, which has been closed to the public since the redevelopment. Between the two tiers there are 18 executive boxes and a restaurant. There are 1600 seats in the lower section of the North Stand which have a heated element, operated by a foot switch.

The Main (South) Stand is now the oldest part of the stadium, having first been built in 1929, although a new roof was installed in 1971 and the facade was rebuilt in 1988. Translucent sheets were added to the Main Stand roof in 1998, to allow more sunlight to reach the pitch. Suspended from the roof girder of the Main Stand is a glass-fronted box, which used to house the press box, but was converted into two executive boxes in 1988. Alongside the main horizontal truss are two retractable columns. These can swing down to a fixing point on the rear wall of the former paddock, which provides additional stability in case of high winds or heavy snow.

The East Stand opened in 1996; it was renamed in 2000 after the Lisbon Lions, the Celtic team that won the 1967 European Cup final. The renaming ceremony was a few days after a Scottish Cup tie had to be postponed after strong winds had damaged guttering in the stand.

Away team fans are housed in the Lisbon Lions Stand, in the south east corner of the ground.

Writing in 1996, Simon Inglis noted that the approaches to the Main Stand were an area of urban deprivation "reminiscent of Belfast during the Troubles". Redevelopment work was carried out in the land surrounding the stadium ahead of the 2014 Commonwealth Games, in a scheme dubbed the Celtic Triangle, in addition to extensive rebuilding of housing in the nearby Barrowfield, Dalmarnock and Parkhead residential districts and the construction of the Commonwealth Arena and Sir Chris Hoy Velodrome directly opposite the stadium. Since 2005, statues of Brother Walfrid, Jimmy Johnstone, Jock Stein and Billy McNeill have been erected outside the Main Stand.

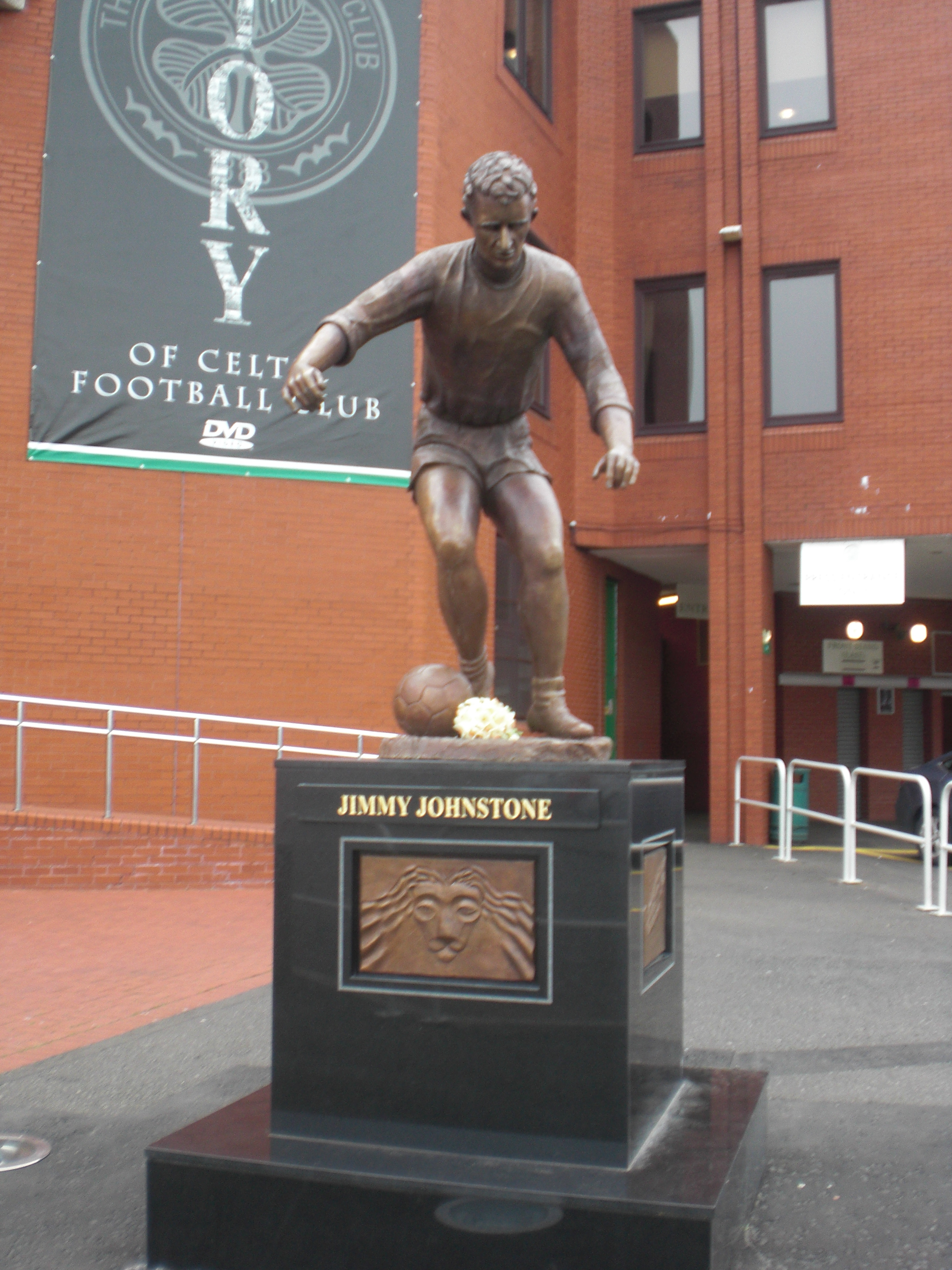
Statue of Jimmy Johnstone (1944–2006).

In summer 2015, the exterior of the stadium was adorned with a display of printed banners which will remain permanently. Fifteen green-coloured sections at either end of the stadium – each 21 metres high – form a display which reads 'Paradise' and depicts images of noted players from throughout the club's history (58 players in total, with a different set shown on each stand). Photographic banners of significant events and trophy wins are displayed on further panels at the corners between the main stand and the end stands. The project was controlled by the Frame agency with design input from Coatbridge-based artist Jim Scullion.

=== Possible developments ===
Celtic have considered the possibility of increasing the capacity of Celtic Park by redeveloping the Main Stand. A completed two-tier rectangular stadium would give Celtic Park a capacity of nearly 75,000. Celtic chief executive Peter Lawwell stated in April 2007 that another 8,000 could be added to the capacity, but the work was not considered cost-effective. This position was re-iterated in November 2022, when Celtic chief executive Michael Nicholson estimated that redeveloping the main stand would cost up to £100 million.

In February 2017, Celtic published plans for a hotel and museum development in an area of land between the Main Stand and London Road. Those outline plans were approved in September 2017, with conditions about the size of any retail space. Amended plans were submitted in July 2020.

== Other uses ==
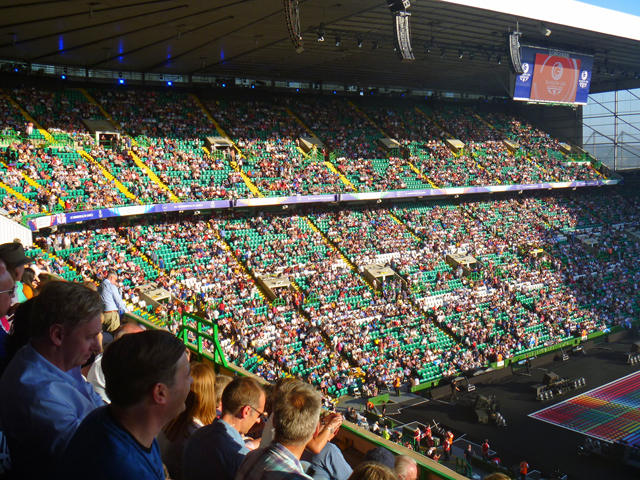
Celtic Park hosted the 2014 Commonwealth Games opening ceremony

Celtic Park has been a home venue for the Scotland national football team over 20 times, the most of any ground apart from the national stadium, Hampden Park. Scotland secured qualification for the 1998 FIFA World Cup with a 2–0 win against Latvia at Celtic Park having beaten Austria there by the same scoreline earlier in the qualifying process, and in 2006 achieved a 6–0 scoreline against the Faroe Islands at the stadium after Hampden was double-booked with a Robbie Williams concert.

The ground most recently hosted a Scotland game in November 2014 (a UEFA Euro 2016 qualifier against Republic of Ireland, won 1–0) when Hampden was unavailable because it had been reconfigured for use as an athletics stadium during the 2014 Commonwealth Games. Celtic Park also hosted both national cup finals in the 2013–14 season for this reason. While Hampden Park was being redeveloped during the 1990s, Celtic Park hosted the 1993 and 1998 Scottish Cup finals and the 1993, 1996 and 1998 Scottish League Cup finals, which were played before, during and after Celtic Park's own major redevelopments.

Before the First World War, Celtic Park was a multi-event venue. It hosted the first ever composite rules shinty-hurling match in Scotland, in 1897. Track and field meetings were held every summer, while the only World Cycling Championship to be staged in Scotland was held at Celtic Park in 1897. Rugby league football was first played in Scotland at Celtic Park, when it hosted a game between a Northern Rugby Football Union representative side and the touring Australia team in 1909. Open-air Masses and a parade for the Coronation of King George V were staged. Celtic Park, along with many other football stadiums, hosted recruitment drives during the First World War. During one such event at Celtic Park, a demonstration of trench warfare was carried out. The quarter-final of the All-Ireland Hurling Championship between Kilkenny and Glasgow was held at the stadium on 21 June 1913. The first pukka speedway race meeting in Scotland was held at Celtic Park on 28 April 1928. It staged 12 meetings in all before closing in July 1928 (although some of the events may have been staged at the neighbouring Nelson Recreation Ground).

Celtic Park has been used for concerts by the Who (1976), Bryan Adams (1992), Prince (1992) and U2 (1993). Wet Wet Wet played there in September 1997, but their performance had to be postponed by a day to avoid clashing with the funeral of Diana, Princess of Wales. Paul McCartney planned a Celtic Park date in his 2003 Back in the World tour, but it was cancelled. American evangelical Christian missionary Billy Graham held an outdoor event at the ground in 1991, his first visit to Scotland since 1955. One of the supporting speakers was Aberdeen player Brian Irvine, who had scored the winning penalty kick against Celtic in the 1990 Scottish Cup Final.

Celtic Park was used for the opening ceremony of the 2014 Commonwealth Games opened by Queen Elizabeth II. With Hampden also being used for the Games, Celtic played two European ties at Murrayfield Stadium instead. Owing to further redevelopment work on Celtic Park in 2015, Celtic scheduled three pre-season games for St Mirren Park.

Celtic Park hosted the 2018–19 final of the Pro14, contested by Leinster and Glasgow, which was the first rugby union match played on the ground.

The band Oasis will start their Live 27 tour at Celtic Park.

== Transport ==
The main railway stations in Glasgow, Central and Queen Street, are approximately 45 minutes walking distance from Celtic Park. Local trains from Glasgow Central on the Argyle Line serve Dalmarnock, which is about 10 minutes walking distance from the ground. Fans travelling to Celtic Park also use Duke Street located half a mile away, with Bellgrove and Bridgeton stations, both approximately one mile away. Between 1897 and 1964, Celtic Park was served by the eponymous Parkhead Stadium railway station. The stadium is served by First Glasgow bus route numbers 2, 8, 61, 64, 240 and 255 along with McGills service 164 . Celtic Park sits adjacent to the A74 (London Road), near to the M74 and M8 motorways. Visitors to the ground travelling by car can park in the surrounding streets. The new Glasgow East End Regeneration Route, which links the two motorways, runs close by Celtic Park.

== See also ==
- Stadium relocations in Scottish football
- List of football stadiums in Scotland
- Lists of stadiums

== Notes ==
Preceded by Ordrup Velodrome; Copenhagen	UCI Track Cycling World Championships; Venue; 1897	Succeeded by Prater Park; Vienna
