= Nelson Recreation Ground =

Sports venue in Glasgow, Scotland

Coordinates: 55.851750°N 4.209417°W

Nelson Recreation Ground Olympic Sports Stadium
- Interactive map of Nelson Recreation Ground; Olympic Sports Stadium
- Location: Janefield Street (formerly Porter Street), Camlachie, Glasgow

Construction
- Opened: 1923
- Closed: 1937

The Nelson Recreation Ground also known as the Olympic Sports Stadium was a former sports ground and stadium on Janefield Street (formerly Porter Street), in Camlachie, Glasgow, Scotland.

The recreation ground hosted trotting races as early as 1902 and in 1923 William Nelson built a more substantial trotting track and whippet track on the land behind numbers 15 to 31 Porter Street adjacent to the north-west side of Celtic Park. The grounds also hosted the Eastern Highland Games and foot racing based on the Powderhall Sprint. In 1928 the Nelson Dirt Track Racing Motor Club became the first club to introduce speedway to Scotland. At least one speedway meeting was staged in 1932 promoted by Lanarkshire Speedways Ltd.

William Nelson (a horse dealer by trade) then built an independent (unlicensed) greyhound track as the venue took shape as a stadium which opened to greyhound racing on 2 September 1930. Boxing bouts were also held at the venue and the stadium was renamed the Olympic Sports Stadium. The stadium was demolished in 1937 and became Dalserf Street (part of the Barrowfield scheme) before the housing was demolished for the Glasgow East End Regeneration Route (A278 road) many years later.
