= Dalmarnock railway station =

Railway station in Glasgow, Scotland

Dalmarnock Scottish Gaelic: Dail Meàrnaig
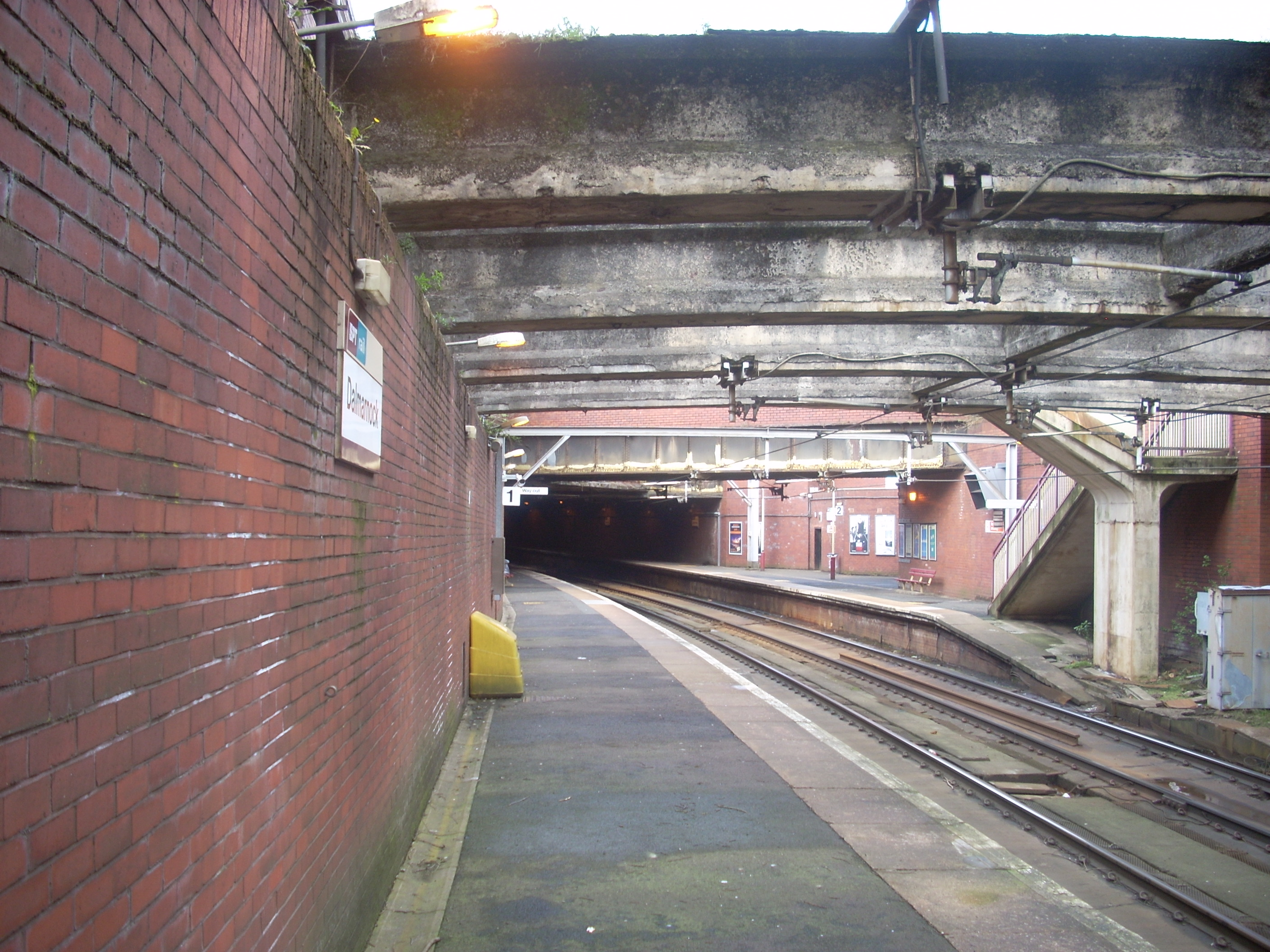
- Dalmarnock station (pre-2014 refurbishment), looking towards the tunnel

General information
- Location: Dalmarnock, Glasgow; Scotland
- Coordinates: 55°50′33″N 4°13′03″W
- Grid reference: NS612631
- Manager: ScotRail
- Transit authority: SPT
- Platforms: 2

Other information
- Station code: DAK

History
- Original company: Glasgow Central Railway
- Pre-grouping: Caledonian Railway
- Post-grouping: LMS

Key dates
- 1 November 1895: Opened
- 5 October 1964: Closed
- 5 November 1979: Re-opened
- 3 June 2012: Temporarily closed for refurbishment
- 23 May 2013: Re-opened after refurbishment

Passengers
- 2021/22: ▲0.227 million
- 2022/23: ▲0.256 million
- 2023/24: ▲0.404 million
- 2024/25: ▲0.462 million
- 2025/26: ▲0.498 million
Location
Notes
- Passenger statistics from the Office of Rail and Road

Dalmarnock railway station, serving the Dalmarnock area of Glasgow, Scotland, lies on the Argyle Line, two and a quarter miles (3.6 km) southeast of Glasgow Central. The northern ends of the side platforms are within a tunnel (refer image). Revamped for the 2014 Commonwealth Games, the station is a 15-minute walk from the Commonwealth Arena and Sir Chris Hoy Velodrome, and Celtic football club's Celtic Park stadium at Parkhead. Due to this, the station is busy on match days and a queueing system takes place on Swanson Street.

== History ==
=== 1879–1964 overview ===
On the viaduct, at the north side of Dalmarnock Road, was the Caledonian Railway high-level station called Bridgeton. Opened on 1 April 1879, on what was then the London Road branch, it closed when the current station opened on 1 November 1895.

The siding from the nearby rail yard to the gas works passed under the viaduct, above the current platform area, and across the Swanston Street level crossing. All remnants have since been demolished.

The low-level station closed on 5 October 1964 as a result of the Beeching Axe, but the station and tunnel remained intact.

=== 1979 reopening ===
At the opening of the Argyle Line in November 1979, the station was served by six trains per hour on Mondays to Saturdays. in the westerly direction all went to Dalmuir, with three via Yoker and three via Singer. Two of these were extended to Dumbarton Central. In the easterly direction all trains travelled around the Hamilton Circle to Motherwell three in the clockwise direction passing through Bellshill prior to Motherwell and three passing through Hamilton Central first. The limited stop Milngavie to/from Lanark trains did not stop at Dalmarnock.

=== Station refurbishment ===
The station underwent a full revamp in time for the 2014 Commonwealth Games, being handy to the athletes' village and several venues. Lifts were installed and a new street-level entrance and ticket office constructed along with landscaping aimed at better connecting the station environs to the nearby River Clyde and Glasgow Green. The station was temporarily closed for renovation on 4 June 2012 and was scheduled to reopen in November 2012, but the closure was extended to spring 2013 because of major problems over groundworks. The station reopened to passengers on 20 May 2013.

=== Flooding ===
Record rainfalls have often led to flooding of the station and closure for a period of several hours in 1903, two days in 1907, several hours in 1935 with water reaching platform height, one day for the whole underground in 1938, several weeks in 2002, several hours in 2017, several hours in 2019, and two days in 2020.

== Services ==
On weekdays and Saturdays, there is 6 trains per each way from Dalmarnock, Westbound; there 6 is trains per hour to Dalmuir (4 via Singer and 2 via Yoker), and a few peak time and late evening services terminate at Garscadden. Eastbound, there is 3 trains per hour to Motherwell (2 via Hamilton and 1 via Whifflet) whilst 1 train an hour to Whifflet and 2 trains an hour to Larkhall also run. On Sundays the service is broadly similar with 5 trains an hour each way.

Preceding station	National Rail	Following station
Rutherglen	ScotRail; Argyle Line	Bridgeton
	Historical railways	
Rutherglen	Caledonian Railway; Glasgow Central Railway	Bridgeton Cross
Rutherglen	Caledonian Railway; London Road branch	London Road

== Gallery ==
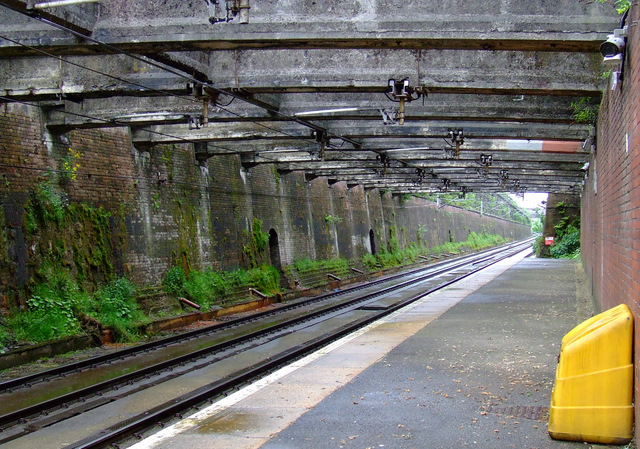
View towards Rutherglen prior to renovation

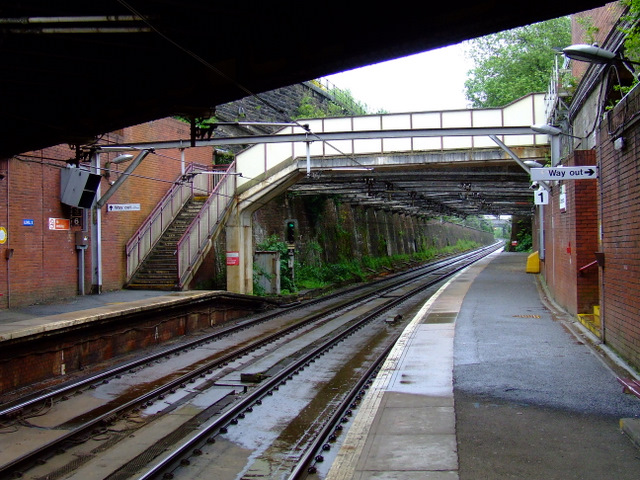
The station in 2011, prior to renovation

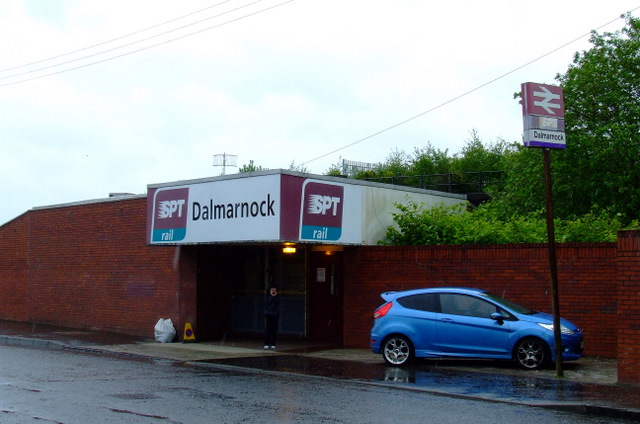
Street level building prior to renovation

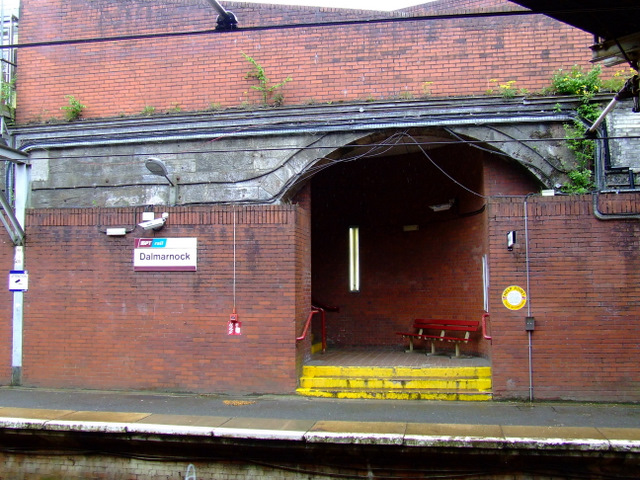
The stairs at Platform 1 prior to renovation

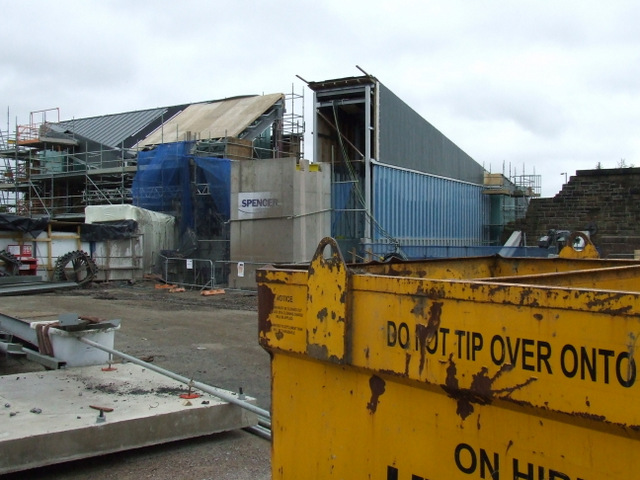
Renovation works in progress, 2013

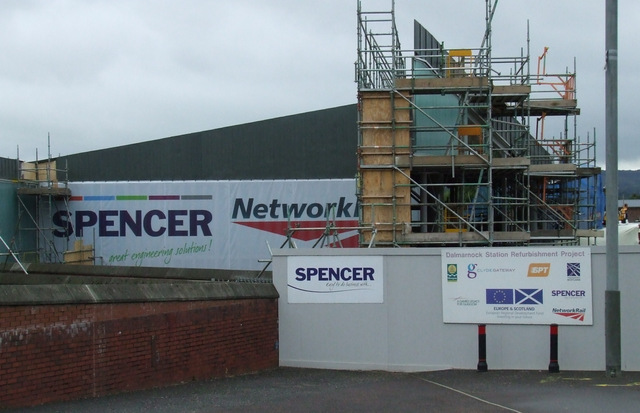
Renovation works in progress, 2013

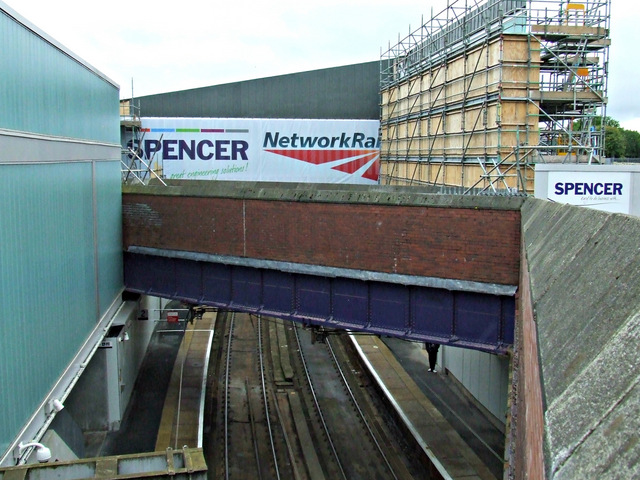
Renovation works in progress, 2013

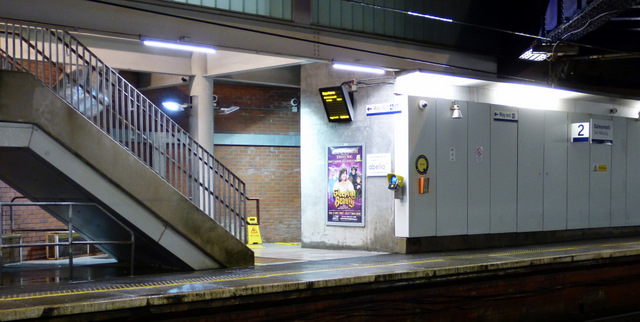
Platform 2 in 2018

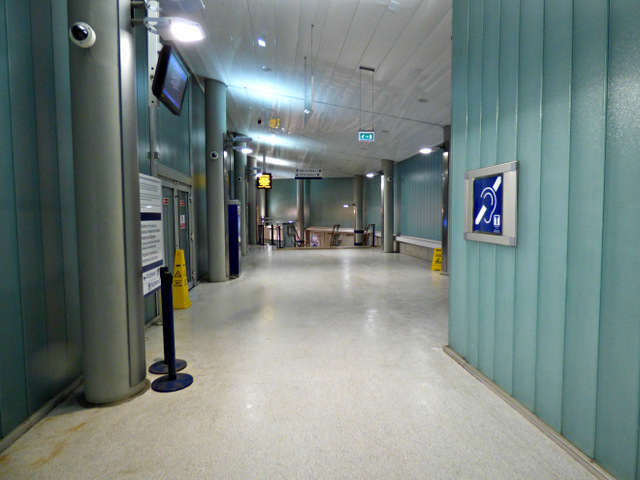
Interior view in 2018

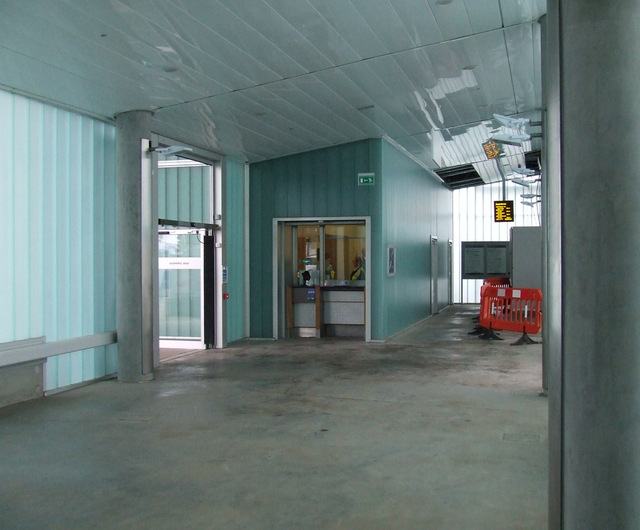
Interior view in 2013

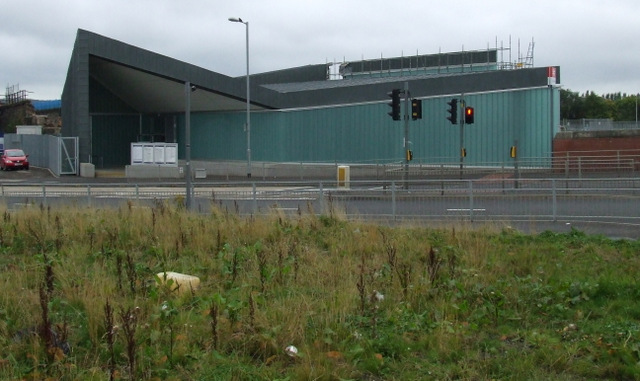
Exterior view in 2013
