= Jim Cairney =

Scottish footballer (1931–2018)

Personal information
- Full name: James Cairney
- Date of birth: 13 July 1931
- Place of birth: Glasgow, Scotland
- Date of death: 2018 (aged 86–87)
- Place of death: Canada
- Height: 5 ft 11 in (1.80 m)
- Position: Half-back

Senior career*
Years	Team	Apps	(Gls)
- Strathclyde
–1949	Shawfield Juniors		
1949–1956	Portsmouth	0	(0)
1956–1958	York City	53	(0)
1958	Polish White Eagles		
1959–1963	Toronto Sparta/Roma		
- New York Ukrainians
- Hartford Italia
Total		53+	(0+)
- * Club domestic league appearances and goals

James Cairney (13 July 1931 – 2018) was a Scottish professional footballer who played as a half-back in the Football League for York City, in Scottish junior football for Strathclyde and Shawfield Juniors, in North America for Toronto Roma, New York Ukrainians and Hartford Italia and was on the books of Portsmouth without making a league appearance.

In 1958, he played in Canada's National Soccer League with the Polish White Eagles and was named to the All-Star team. He would play with league rivals Toronto Sparta for the 1959 season and once more was selected to the All-Star team. For the 1961 NSL season, Toronto Sparta was renamed, Toronto Roma. Cairney would play in the Eastern Canada Professional Soccer League in 1962 when Toronto Roma became a member. He would re-sign with Toronto for the 1963 season.

Jim Cairney was the brother of Scottish actor and writer John Cairney. They were raised in the Parkhead area of Glasgow (where his first club Strathclyde were based); the referee Tiny Wharton was a childhood acquaintance. Jim Cairney died in Canada in the summer of 2018.
