= John Cairney =

Scottish actor (1930–2023)

- Cairney as Robert Burns (1965)
- Born: 16 February 1930; Glasgow, Scotland
- Died: 6 September 2023 (aged 93)
- Occupations: Actor; writer
- Years active: 1957–1999
- Spouses: Sheila Parker Cowan (m. 1954; div. 1979) Alannah O'Sullivan (m. 1980)

John Cairney (16 February 1930 – 6 September 2023) was a Scottish stage, film and television actor who found fame through his one-man shows on Robert Burns, Robert Louis Stevenson, Robert Service, Charles Rennie Mackintosh and William McGonagall.

== Biography ==
John Cairney was born on 16 February 1930 in the Baillieston area of Glasgow. He is the brother of footballer Jim Cairney. They were raised in the Parkhead area of Glasgow; the referee Tiny Wharton was a childhood acquaintance.

He briefly attended art college but dropped out to pursue the life of an actor.

Cairney worked as an actor, recitalist, lecturer, director and theatre consultant. He was also a published author and an exhibited painter. Trained at the Royal Scottish Academy of Music and Drama, he was a notable Hamlet at the Citizens' Theatre in Glasgow and a successful Macbeth at the Edinburgh International Festival. In 1954, he appeared in the British debut for Arthur Miller's The Crucible. He played King Humanity in Tyrone Guthrie's Festival production of Sir David Lyndsey's Ane Satyre of the Thrie Estaitis in 1959. In 1962, he joined the Edinburgh Gateway Company, playing James Boswell in Robert McLellan's Young Auchinleck. He was in This Man Craig on television, while his many films include Lucky Jim, A Night to Remember, Operation Bullshine, The Flesh and the Fiends, Victim, Cleopatra and Jason and the Argonauts.

Cairney would become associated with Scottish poet Robert Burns for the remainder of his career, when in 1965 he performed a three hour one-man show, where he recited Burns's works. The play, titled There Was A Man, was presented at the Traverse Theatre, running for over two months due to high demand. The show was also televised and recorded as a successful album. In 1968, he also wrote and starred in a television adaptation of The Robert Burns Story. In 1970s, Cairney played in a political drama by BBC Scotland, named Scotch on the Rocks. In 1987, he published his autobiography, called The Man Who Played Burns.

Cairney gained a PhD from Victoria University, Wellington, New Zealand, and was much in demand internationally as a lecturer, writer and consultant on Robert Louis Stevenson, Charles Rennie Mackintosh and Robert Burns.

Cairney wrote books on many famous Scots as well as other books on football (particularly Celtic), theatre and his native Glasgow, where he lived with his New Zealand–born wife, actress and scriptwriter Alannah O'Sullivan.

Cairney married Sheila Cowan in 1954, whom he met at the Royal Scottish Academy of Music and Drama. He had five children with her. Cairney divorced her in 1979 and married actress and playwright Alannah O'Sullivan in 1980.

Cairney fell ill on the morning of 6 September 2023 and died around midday at age 93. He was buried on September 21.

== Theatre ==
Year	Title	Role	Company	Director	Notes
1959	Ane Satyre of the Thrie Estaitis	King Humanity		Tyrone Guthrie	play by Sir David Lyndsay, adapted by Robert Kemp
1962	Young Auchinleck	James Boswell	Gateway Theatre, Edinburgh	Kenneth Parrott	
1965	There Was A Man	Robert Burns	Traverse Theatre, Edinburgh		
1972	Willie Rough	Charlie McGrath	Lyceum Theatre, Edinburgh	Bill Bryden	

== Filmography ==
Year	Title	Role	Refs
1957	Ill Met by Moonlight	Elias	
1957	Miracle in Soho	Tom	
1957	Lucky Jim	Roberts	
1957	Windom's Way	Jan Vidal	
1958	A Night to Remember	Murphy	
1959	Shake Hands with the Devil	Mike O'Callaghan	
1959	Operation Bullshine	Gunner Willie Ross	
1960	The Flesh and the Fiends	Chris Jackson	
1960	The Edgar Wallace Mysteries – Marriage of Convenience	Larry Wilson	
1961	Victim	Bridie	
1963	Cleopatra	Phoebus	
1963	Jason and the Argonauts	Hylas	
1964	The Devil-Ship Pirates	Harry	
1965	Spaceflight IC-1	Steven Thomas	
1965	A Study in Terror	Michael Osborne	
1999	Nightmare Man	Trapper	
