= Tollcross railway station =

Former railway station in Glasgow, Scotland

Tollcross

General information
- Location: Tollcross, Glasgow; Scotland
- Coordinates: 55.840656°N 4.174414°W
- Platforms: 2

Other information
- Status: Disused

History
- Original company: Glasgow Central Railway
- Pre-grouping: Caledonian Railway

Key dates
- 1 February 1897: Opened as Tollcross
- 5 October 1964: Closed
Location

Tollcross station was a railway station in the east end of Glasgow, Scotland. It was opened by the Caledonian Railway as Tollcross on 1 February 1897.

Located next to the settlements of Braidfauld and Auchenshuggle between the London Road and Tollcross Road arterial routes, it was closed to passengers on 5 October 1964. The lines have also been removed, but the land has not been built upon into the 21st century.

Preceding station	Historical railways	Following station
Carmyle; Line closed; station open on other lines	Glasgow Central Railway; Caledonian Railway	Parkhead Stadium; Line and Station closed
