= Barrowfield =

Neighbourhood of Glasgow, Scotland

Coordinates: 55.851977°N 4.212361°W

Barrowfield: Scots: Barraefield
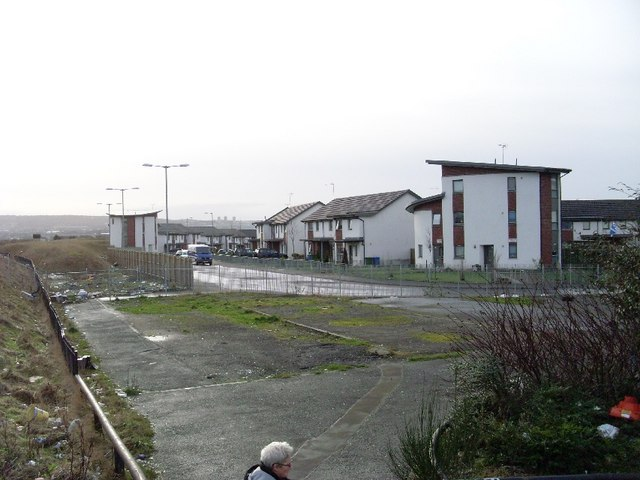
- Modern housing on Stamford Street

- Location within the Glasgow City council area Location within Scotland
- OS grid reference: NS616643
- Council area: Glasgow City
- Lieutenancy area: Glasgow
- Country: Scotland
- Sovereign state: United Kingdom
- Post town: GLASGOW
- Postcode district: G31 / G40
- Dialling code: 0141
- Police: Scotland
- Fire: Scottish
- Ambulance: Scottish
- UK Parliament: Glasgow East
- Scottish Parliament: Glasgow Shettleston

Barrowfield is a neighbourhood of Glasgow, Scotland, close to Celtic Park, home of Celtic, which lies immediately to the east. It is bounded by the A89 road (Gallowgate) to the north and the A74 (London Road) to the south.

== History ==
Being an area of working class housing enclosed by main roads and railway lines, Barrowfield consequently developed a distinctive character. The original 1930s council housing scheme flats (built to accommodate those cleared from Glasgow's 19th century slums in nearby areas such as Camlachie) became increasingly hard to let and were demolished in the 2000s to make way for more appealing houses. A small section of the original tenements remain around the junction of Law Street and Overtown Street, though extensively refurbished.

In the 1950s, the area changed from a working-class neighbourhood like most other areas of the city to being a place renowned for its gangs, namely "The Torch" and "The Spur" whose territory was respectively located at the north and south ends of the main thoroughfare; Each terrorised the other's patch, and the area was so violent that the fighting diminished in the 1980s only because the gang leaders realised that dealing in drugs was more profitable. Unfortunately for the community, this meant the scheme had hundreds of drug abusers from all over Glasgow coming to the area to buy their "gear". Barrowfield therefore has a high mortality rate amongst the youth, largely due to drug abuse and suicide. In the early 21st century the area underwent a massive revamp, but the drug problem persists and crime is still high. In 2009, the data zone covering the neighbourhood was classed as the most deprived in Scotland.

Footballer James McArthur and actor Paul Brannigan grew up in Barrowfield in the 1990s.

== Sport ==
A historic football stadium called Barrowfield Park was the home ground of Clyde between 1877 and 1898 prior to their move to Shawfield Stadium, and also hosted matches for Eastern and Albatross. However, the ground was actually in the city's Dalmarnock neighbourhood, taking its name from the historic Barrowfield rural estate which once occupied much of the wider area.

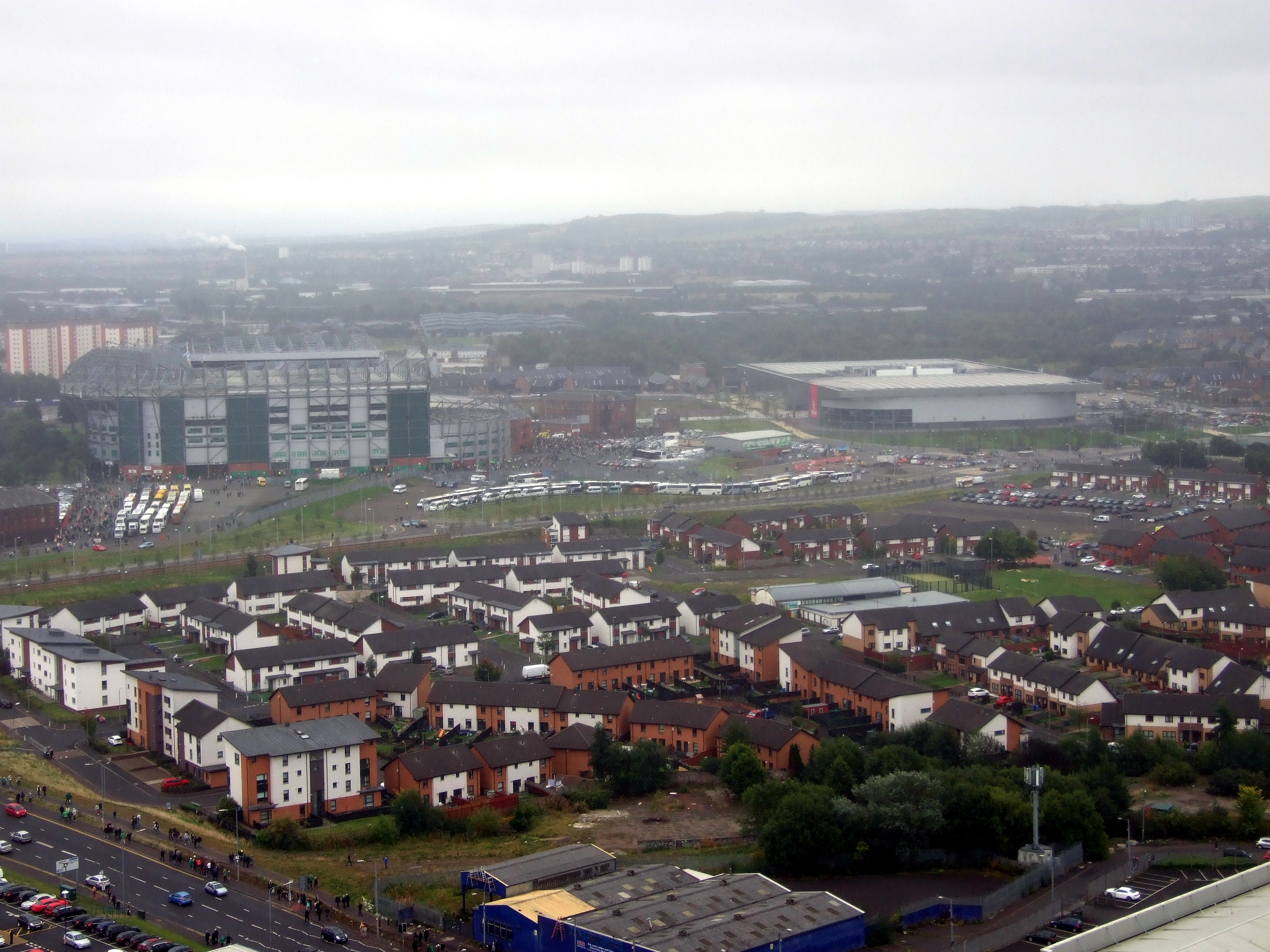
Modern housing in Barrowfield, with Celtic Park and Commonwealth Arena beyond (2013)

For many years, Celtic conducted most of their training at a facility to the east of Celtic Park known as Barrowfield, which remained owned and used by the club after moving their main base of operations to Lennoxtown in 2007, and was later redeveloped for use by the women's team and youth academy in the 2020s. This facility is also not within the existing Barrowfield residential area which lies to the west of the stadium. The source of the double naming stems from defunct junior club Bridgeton Waverley who played at a ground named Barrowfield (located approximately at Mountainblue Street today and also named after the historic estate), until the 1930s when that land – along with the Nelson Recreation Ground a few blocks away – was bought over for construction of the new housing scheme of the same name. Waverley relocated to a new site about 3/4 mile (1.2 kilometres) east, adjacent to Belvidere Hospital and part of Westthorn Park, and named it 'New Barrowfield'. Celtic later took control of it as their training ground in the early 1960s.

Following the 2014 Commonwealth Games held in Glasgow, international-class sporting facilities can be found within walking distance of Barrowfield: the Commonwealth Arena and Sir Chris Hoy Velodrome are in nearby Dalmarnock. The Crownpoint Sports Complex, a modern outdoor athletics track, is also nearby adjacent to St Mungo's Academy.
