= Parkhead Stadium railway station =

Former railway station in Scotland

Coordinates: 55.8486°N 4.1997°W

Parkhead Stadium

General information
- Location: Parkhead, Glasgow; Scotland
- Platforms: 2

Other information
- Status: Disused

History
- Original company: Glasgow Central Railway
- Pre-grouping: Caledonian Railway

Key dates
- 1 February 1897: Opened as Parkhead
- 3 March 1952: Renamed as Parkhead Stadium
- 5 October 1964: Closed
Location

Parkhead Stadium was a railway station in the east end of Glasgow. It was opened by the Caledonian Railway as Parkhead on 1 February 1897.

In recognition of its proximity to the Celtic Park football stadium, it was known as Parkhead (for Celtic Park) by 1904; and it was also referred to in some timetables as Parkhead for Celtic Park.

The station was renamed Parkhead Stadium by British Railways on 3 March 1952. The nearby ex-North British Railway's Coatbridge Branch station, "Parkhead", was renamed "Parkhead North" on 30 June 1952.

It was closed to passengers on 5 October 1964.

| Preceding station | Historical railways | Following station |
|---|---|---|
| Tollcross; Line and Station closed | Glasgow Central Railway; Caledonian Railway | Bridgeton; Line closed; Station open |
