= Parkhead North railway station =

Former railway station in Scotland

Parkhead North

General information
- Location: Parkhead, Glasgow; Scotland
- Coordinates: 55.8560°N 4.1981°W
- Platforms: 2

Other information
- Status: Disused

History
- Original company: Coatbridge Branch
- Pre-grouping: North British Railway
- Post-grouping: LNER

Key dates
- 1 February 1871: Opened as Parkhead
- 30 June 1952: Renamed as Parkhead North
- 19 September 1955: Closed
Location

Parkhead was a railway station in the east end of Glasgow. It was opened as Parkhead, by the North British Railway on 1 February 1871. It was renamed Parkhead North on 30 June 1952 by British Railways. This was to differentiate it from the nearby ex-Caledonian Railway Parkhead station on the former Glasgow Central Railway.

The station was closed to passengers on 19 September 1955.

Proposals in the 2010s and 2020s for a potential new station for the area would utilise roughly the same location as Parkhead North, albeit new infrastructure would be required in all aspects of the project as there was no longer any visible trace of the original station.

Preceding station	Historical railways	Following station
Carntyne; Line and Station open	Coatbridge Branch; North British Railway	Bellgrove; Line and Station open
