= Parkhead =

Area of Glasgow, Scotland

Coordinates: 55.8486°N 4.1978°W

Parkhead: Scots: Pairkheid
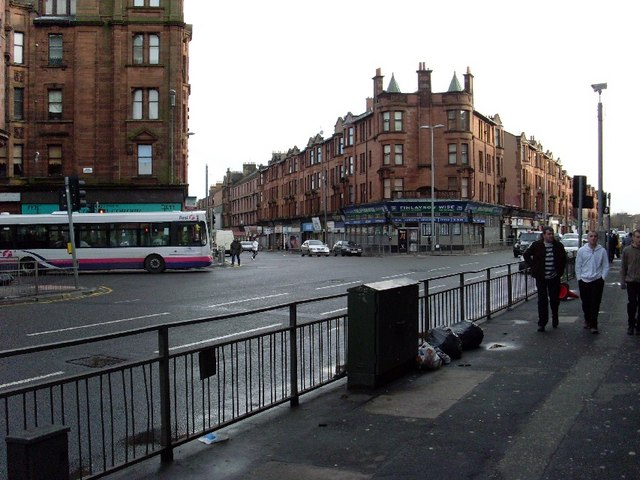
- Parkhead Cross, the traditional heart of the district

- Location within Glasgow
- OS grid reference: NS625639
- Council area: Glasgow City Council
- Lieutenancy area: Glasgow
- Country: Scotland
- Sovereign state: United Kingdom
- Post town: GLASGOW
- Postcode district: G31
- Dialling code: 0141
- Police: Scotland
- Fire: Scottish
- Ambulance: Scottish
- UK Parliament: Glasgow East
- Scottish Parliament: Glasgow Shettleston

Parkhead (Scots: Pairkheid) is a district in the East End of Glasgow. Its name comes from a small weaving hamlet at the meeting place of the Great Eastern Road (now the Gallowgate and Tollcross Road) and Westmuir Street. Glasgow's Eastern Necropolis cemetery was laid out in the area in 1847 beside the Gallowgate. It borders with Shettleston and Tollcross to the immediate east, and Camlachie and Dennistoun to the west.

== History ==
The area flourished with the discovery of coal in 1837 and grew into an industrial centre. In 1897, William Beardmore and Company became famous with the production of high grade steel and castings at the local Parkhead Forge, founded about 1837 and extended between 1884 and 1914. After years of decline, the massive plant was closed in 1976, and in 1986 the construction of the first phase of The Forge Shopping Centre began on the site. The shopping centre opened in the autumn of 1988, and in 1994 an indoor market was added adjacent to it. The final element, a retail park, was completed in three stages between 1996 and 2002.

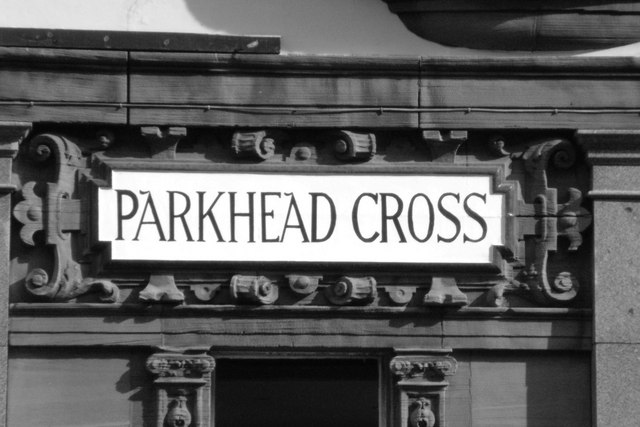
Parkhead Cross Sign

Parkhead Cross is a major road junction which is the meeting point of Gallowgate, Duke Street, Westmuir Street, Tollcross Road and Burgher Street, which together form a turreted Edwardian five-way junction, including several fine buildings making the junction notable, such as the former Glasgow Savings Bank. The junction, which also incorporates the northern termination of the major Springfield Road thoroughfare, can become very busy due to traffic for football games at nearby Celtic Park.

Most of the district's amenities and places of worship are situated within a few blocks of the Cross.

== Hospitals ==
Belvidere Hospital, built on the Belvidere estate which extended from London Road to the River Clyde, originally consisted of wooden huts thrown up rapidly when the city's older fever hospital at Parliamentary Road was overwhelmed by a typhus epidemic in 1870. A self-contained smallpox hospital of five brick pavilions was built from 1874. After this, nineteen pavilions of red-and-white striped brick were set up for the fever hospital. In recent times, with the general closure of infectious disease hospitals, care of elderly people became its main function before closing in 1999.

Parkhead Hospital, which opened on 12 November 1988, was said to be the only new psychiatric hospital to be built in Scotland in the 20th century. (However, some 18th and 19th century institutions did move to new buildings during the 20th century.) It was built on part of the old forge land, next to the Parkhead Health Centre, and replaced the psychiatric and psycho-geriatric admission wards of both Duke Street Hospital (formerly known as the Eastern District Hospital) and Gartloch Hospital – both units moved into the new hospital in 1988 on the day of a Rangers-Celtic match at the nearby Celtic Park. The hospital closed in 2018, with the intention of building a new health facility on the site.

== Libraries ==
Parkhead also has one of Glasgow's original Carnegie libraries, deftly designed in the Edwardian Baroque style by James Robert Rhind.

== Sport ==
=== Celtic Park and Barrowfield ===
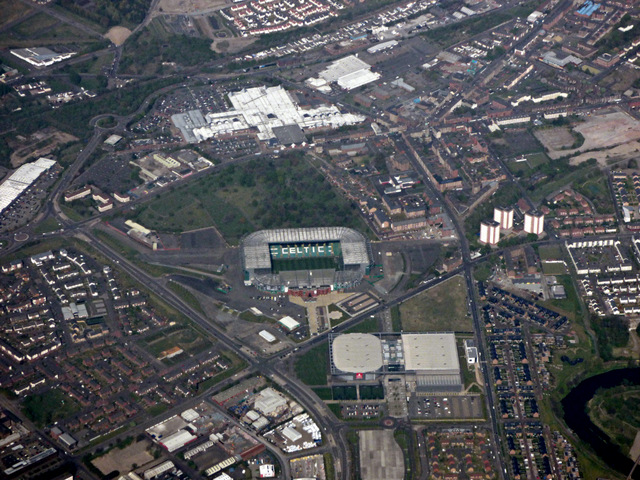
Aerial view of area from south-west (2017) with Celtic Park at centre, The Forge Shopping Centre and Parkhead Cross top, Emirates Arena bottom, Barrowfield housing estate left

Parkhead is perhaps best known as the home of Celtic Football Club and their stadium Celtic Park, which opened in 1892 after the club moved across the road from their old ground, which they had been playing on for their first three years. A journalist covering the event reported that it was like "moving from the graveyard to paradise", referencing the proximity of the adjacent cemetery, hence the nickname "Paradise". Celtic Park is located at 95 Kerrydale Street, just off London Road. The stadium itself is commonly referred to as 'Parkhead' because of its location. The stadium was substantially rebuilt between 1994 and 1998 and is Scotland's largest football stadium by seating capacity.

From the early 1960s, Celtic conducted most of their training routines at a facility on the periphery of Parkhead named Barrowfield, east of Celtic Park (it is not located in the Barrowfield residential area which lies to the west of the stadium toward Bridgeton). By 2005, those facilities were seen as antiquated, particularly in comparison to those of their Old Firm rivals Rangers at Auchenhowie. Celtic considered building new facilities at their site in Barrowfield, but instead decided to develop the Lennoxtown training centre outside the city. Today there are still football pitches on the land as well as a large Celtic social club; the Celtic first team temporarily resumed training at Barrowfield in November 2011, after a spate of training ground injuries led manager Neil Lennon to fear that the Lennoxtown pitches were responsible. In 2019, Celtic announced plans to redevelop Barrowfield for use by their youth academy and women's team, including an indoor pitch and a matchday venue, augmenting the Lennoxtown base which would continue to be used by the first team squad and strengthening their connection to their roots in the East End of Glasgow.

=== Other ===
Prior to its dissolution, Parkhead FC was one of the most successful Junior sides of the first half of the 20th century. Two other strong teams of the time, Bridgeton Waverley and Strathclyde also had their grounds in close proximity (New Barrowfield and Springfield Park respectively); none of the three clubs survived into the late 20th century. Parkhead's ground Helenslea Park is now a landscaped public park.

There are also two bowling clubs and a derelict sports ground (Helenvale Park, formerly used by the Glasgow Corporation Transport department which had a large bus and tram depot nearby) in the vicinity – Crownpoint Sports Complex, a replacement modern outdoor athletics track, is located beyond the western border of the district adjacent to St Mungo's Academy. After the 2014 Commonwealth Games was held in Glasgow, Parkhead now has international-class sporting facilities within walking distance: the Commonwealth Arena and Sir Chris Hoy Velodrome are located in nearby Dalmarnock.

== Rail ==
- Parkhead North railway station
- Parkhead Stadium railway station

== Famous Residents ==
- John Scott Russell, engineer
- Jim Cairney, footballer
- John Cairney, writer

== See also ==
- Glasgow tower blocks
