= Bridgeton railway station =

Railway station in Glasgow, Scotland

Bridgeton Scottish Gaelic: Baile na Drochaid
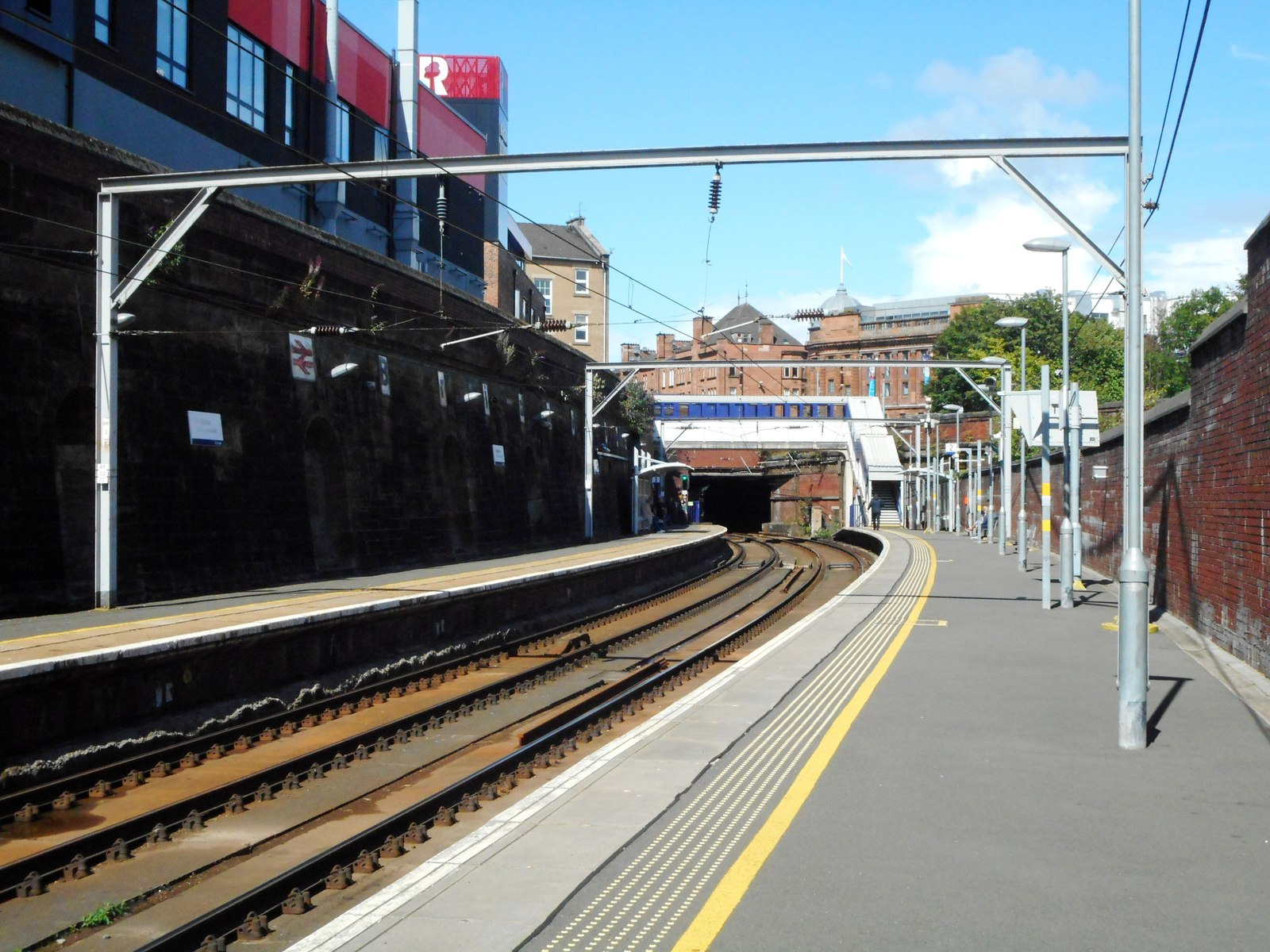
- Bridgeton station in 2018, looking northwest towards Argyle Street

General information
- Location: Bridgeton, Glasgow; Scotland
- Coordinates: 55.8484°N 4.2250°W
- Grid reference: NS607639
- Manager: ScotRail
- Transit authority: SPT
- Platforms: 2

Other information
- Station code: BDG

Key dates
- 1 November 1895: Opened
- 5 October 1964: Closed
- 5 November 1979: Re-opened

Passengers
- 2021/22: ▲0.476 million
- 2022/23: ▲0.500 million
- 2023/24: ▲0.768 million
- 2024/25: ▲0.803 million
- 2025/26: ▲0.827 million
Location
Notes
- Passenger statistics from the Office of Rail and Road

Bridgeton railway station serves the Bridgeton district of Glasgow, Scotland and is a station on the Argyle Line, 1 3/4 miles (2.8 km) south east of Glasgow Central. The station is operated by ScotRail who also provide all train services.

== History ==
Called Bridgeton Cross Station, it opened on 1 November 1895 when the line between Glasgow Green and Rutherglen was opened by the Glasgow Central Railway. The station became a junction with the opening of the line to Carmyle and Kirkhill on 1 February 1897. Westbound services ran to Stobcross, from where they could proceed to Possil via Maryhill Central, Partickhill and points north via the connection to the Stobcross Railway or on to the Lanarkshire and Dunbartonshire Railway to Dumbarton and Balloch Central via Partick Central & Dalmuir Riverside.

In 1956 the line was re-signalled with colour light signals controlled from the re-equipped signal boxes at Bridgeton Cross Junction and Stobcross Junction. However, the station was closed along with both lines on 5 October 1964 as a result of the Beeching Axe. The tracks were subsequently lifted, but the station and tunnels were left intact.

As part of the Argyle Line project, the Rutherglen line platforms reopened as Bridgeton Station on 5 November 1979, as offering regular commuter services into Central Station (low level) and on towards the western suburbs.

In preparation for the 2014 Commonwealth Games, the station underwent substantial renovations in 2010.

== Accidents and incidents ==
- On 2 February 1929, a passenger train was diverted into the bay platform due to a signalman's error. Several people were injured when the train crashed through the buffers.

== Services ==
=== 1979 ===
When the Argyle Line was opened in 1979, there were six trains an hour to the Hamilton Circle, from Dalmuir, with two services an hour going as far west as Dumbarton Central. The hourly service between Lanark and Milngavie ran non-stop through Bridgeton station.

=== 2008 ===
Four trains per hour daily head westbound towards Glasgow Central and beyond (Milngavie and Dalmuir) and eastbound towards Motherwell (with services onward to Lanark).

=== 2015 ===
The basic four trains per hour frequency remains unchanged, but since the December 2014 timetable recast southbound trains now run to either Motherwell via Hamilton Central or via Whifflet (though alternate services on that route terminate at Whifflet). On Sundays, southbound trains also serve Larkhall every hour and Balloch every 30 minutes.

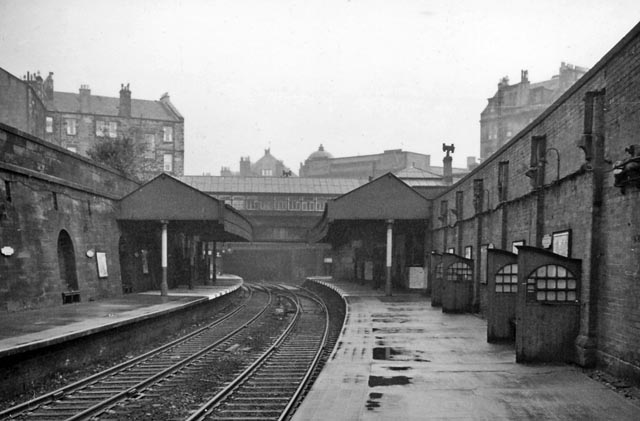
Bridgeton Cross Station in 1961

=== Routes ===
Preceding station	National Rail	Following station
Dalmarnock	ScotRail; Argyle Line	Argyle Street
	Historical railways	
Parkhead; Line and station closed	Caledonian Railway; Glasgow Central Railway	Glasgow Green; Line open; station closed
Dalmarnock	Caledonian Railway; Glasgow Central Railway	Glasgow Green; Line open; station closed
