= List of motorway service areas in the United Kingdom =

Motorway service areas, also known as service stations, are places where drivers can leave a motorway to refuel, rest, or take refreshments, and generally speaking no access to the local road network - the only means of entry and exit being the motorway which the service area serves. Some also incorporate or adjoin hotels. Only 20 motorway services in England remain in the ownership of the Department for Transport and let on 50-year leases to private operating companies. The vast majority of motorway services in the UK are owned by one of three companies: Moto, Welcome Break and Roadchef and a developing chain of stations being constructed by Extra.

Some of the 94 service areas on this list are on major A-roads rather than motorways. These share the defining properties of motorway service areas, being named service areas operated by a single company with a range of facilities including food & drink providers, toilet facilities and vehicle servicing facilities. Such service areas are rare on most A-roads, where basic filling stations with a single shop are more common.

== List ==
Picture	Name	Operator	Road	County	Notes
	Abington	Welcome Break	M74	South Lanarkshire	The service station is one of fourteen for which large murals were commissioned from artist David Fisher in the 1990s, designed to reflect the local area and history.
	Annandale Water	Roadchef	A74(M)	Dumfries and Galloway	
	Baldock	Extra	A1(M)	Hertfordshire	
	Beaconsfield	Extra	M40	Buckinghamshire	
	Birch	Moto	M62	Greater Manchester	
	Birchanger Green	Welcome Break	M11	Essex	
	Blackburn with Darwen	Extra	M65	Lancashire	
	Blyth	Moto	A1(M)	Nottinghamshire	
	Bothwell	Roadchef	M74	South Lanarkshire	
	Bridgwater	Moto	M5	Somerset	
	Burton-in-Kendal	Moto	M6	Cumbria	
	Burtonwood	Welcome Break	M62	Cheshire	
	Cairn Lodge	Westmorland	M74	Lanarkshire	
	Cambridge	Extra	A14	Cambridgeshire	
	Cardiff Gate	Welcome Break	M4	Cardiff	
	Cardiff West	Moto	M4	Cardiff	
	Charnock Richard	Welcome Break	M6	Lancashire	
	Cherwell Valley	Moto	M40	Oxfordshire	
	Chester	Roadchef	M56	Cheshire	
	Chieveley	Moto	M4	Berkshire	
	Clacket Lane	Roadchef	M25	Surrey	
	Cobham	Extra	M25	Surrey	
	Corley	Welcome Break	M6	Warwickshire	
	Cullompton	Extra	M5	Devon	
	Doncaster North	Moto	M18	South Yorkshire	
	Donington Park	Moto	M1	Leicestershire	
	Durham	Roadchef	A1(M)	County Durham	
	Exeter	Moto	M5	Devon	
	Ferrybridge	Moto	M62	West Yorkshire	
	Fleet	Welcome Break	M3	Hampshire	
	Folkestone	ChannelPorts	M20	Kent	
	Frankley	Moto	M5	Worcestershire	
	Gloucester	Westmorland	M5	Gloucestershire	
	Gordano	Welcome Break	M5	Somerset	
	Grantham North	Moto	A1	Lincolnshire	
	Gretna Green	Welcome Break	A74(M)	Dumfries and Galloway	
	Hamilton	Roadchef	M74	South Lanarkshire	
	Hartshead Moor	Welcome Break	M62	West Yorkshire	
	Heart of Scotland	BP	M8	Lanarkshire	
	Heston	Moto	M4	Greater London	
	Hilton Park	Moto	M6	Staffordshire	
	Hopwood Park	Welcome Break	M42	Worcestershire	
	Keele	Welcome Break	M6	Staffordshire	
	Killington Lake	Roadchef	M6	Cumbria	
	Kinross	Moto	M90	Perth and Kinross	
	Knutsford	Moto	M6	Cheshire	
	Lancaster (Forton)	Moto	M6	Lancashire	
	Leeming Bar	Moto	A1(M)	North Yorkshire	
	Leicester Forest East	Welcome Break	M1	Leicestershire	
	Leigh Delamere	Moto	M4	Wiltshire	
	London Gateway	Welcome Break	M1	Greater London	
	Magor	Roadchef	M4	Monmouthshire	
	Maidstone	Roadchef	M20	Kent	
	Medway	Moto	M2	Kent	
	Membury	Welcome Break	M4	Berkshire	
	Michaelwood	Welcome Break	M5	Gloucestershire	
	Newport Pagnell	Welcome Break	M1	Buckinghamshire	
	Northampton	Roadchef	M1	Northamptonshire	
	Norton Canes	Roadchef	M6 Toll	Staffordshire	
	Oxford	Welcome Break	M40	Oxfordshire	
	Pease Pottage	Moto	M23	West Sussex	
	Peterborough	Extra	A1(M)	Cambridgeshire	
	Pont Abraham	Roadchef	M4	Carmarthenshire	It is located at junction 49, the western terminus of the M4 motorway in Wales where the M4 joins the A48 and A483 on a roundabout. The Pont Abraham Motorway service area was opened in 1983. It is near Pontarddulais and owned by Roadchef.
	Reading	Moto	M4	Berkshire	
	Rivington	EG On The Move	M61	Lancashire	
	Rotherham	Welcome Break	M1	South Yorkshire	
	Rownhams	Roadchef	M27	Hampshire	
	Rugby	Moto	M6	Warwickshire	
	Sandbach	Roadchef	M6	Cheshire	
	Sarn Park	Welcome Break	M4	Bridgend	
	Sawtry	Moto	A1(M)	Cambridgeshire	
	Scotch Corner	Moto	A1(M)	North Yorkshire	
	Sedgemoor	Northbound: Welcome Break	M5	Somerset	
	Sedgemoor	Southbound: Roadchef	M5	Somerset	
	Severn View	Moto	M48	Gloucestershire	
	Skelton Lake	Extra	M1	West Yorkshire	Opened 2020
	South Mimms	Welcome Break	M25	Hertfordshire	
	Southwaite	Moto	M6	Cumbria	
	Stafford	Northbound: Moto	M6	Staffordshire	
	Stafford	Southbound: Roadchef	M6	Staffordshire	
	Stirling	Moto	M9 / M80	Stirling	
	Strensham	Roadchef	M5	Worcestershire	
	Sutton Scotney	Roadchef	A34	Hampshire	
	Swansea	Moto	M4	Swansea	
	Tamworth	Moto	M42	Staffordshire	
	Taunton Deane	Roadchef	M5	Somerset	
	Tebay	Westmorland	M6	Cumbria	
	Telford	Welcome Break	M54	Shropshire	
	Thurrock	Moto	M25	Essex	
	Tibshelf	Roadchef	M1	Derbyshire	
	Toddington	Moto	M1	Bedfordshire	
	Todhills	Moto (southbound)	M6	Cumbria	
	Trowell	Moto	M1	Nottinghamshire	
	Warwick	Welcome Break	M40	Warwickshire	
	Washington	Moto	A1(M)	Tyne and Wear	
	Watford Gap	Roadchef	M1	Northamptonshire	
	Wetherby	Moto	A1(M)	North Yorkshire	
	Winchester	Moto	M3	Hampshire	
	Woodall	Welcome Break	M1	South Yorkshire	
	Woolley Edge	Moto	M1	West Yorkshire	

== Map ==
Locations of motorway service areas and their operating companies in the United Kingdom.
Operators: Applegreen BP EG Group Extra Moto Roadchef Stop 24 Welcome Break Westmorland
