= Hopwood, Worcestershire =

Village in Worcestershire, England

Coordinates: 52.37214°N 1.95736°W

Hopwood
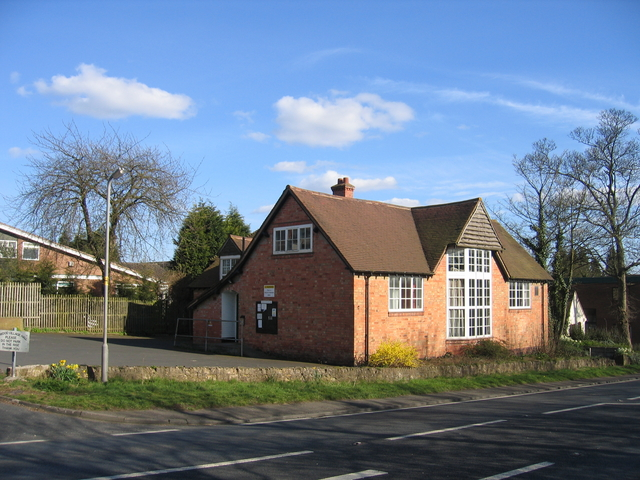
- The village hall

- Location within Worcestershire
- Area: 0.5279 km^{2} (0.2038 sq mi)
- Population: 952 (2021 census)
  - Density: 1,803/km^{2} (4,670/sq mi)
- OS grid reference: SP030749
- Civil parish: Alvechurch
- District: Bromsgrove
- Shire county: Worcestershire
- Region: West Midlands
- Country: England
- Sovereign state: United Kingdom
- Post town: BIRMINGHAM
- Postcode district: B48
- Dialling code: 0121
- Police: West Mercia
- Fire: Hereford and Worcester
- Ambulance: West Midlands
- UK Parliament: Bromsgrove

Hopwood is a village in the civil parish of Alvechurch, in the Bromsgrove district, in Worcestershire, England, located south of Birmingham, on the Worcester and Birmingham Canal. The village developed around an inn, where users of the canal would stop along their journey. In 2021 it had a population of 952.

Today, Hopwood is the location of Hopwood Park services, a motorway service station on the M42 motorway.
