= Cullompton services =

Motorway service station in Devon, England

Cullompton Services
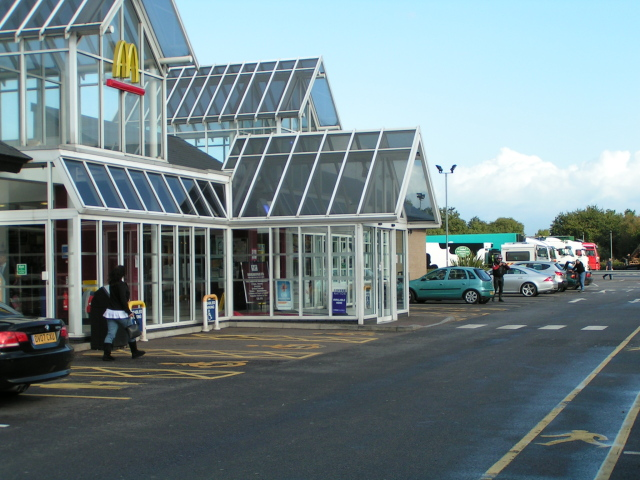

- Location within Devon

Information
- County: Devon
- Road: M5
- Coordinates: 50.8621°N 3.3847°W
- Operator: Extra
- Previous operator: McDonald's
- Date opened: 1999
- Website: extraservices.co.uk/locations/cullompton-services-m5-j28/

Cullompton services is a motorway service station on the M5 motorway near Exeter. It is owned by Extra. It has a McDonald's restaurant which is franchised and offers table service, a small WHSmith and a Costa Coffee which is owned by Moto Hospitality. There is also a Shell petrol station nearby.

== Location ==
The services are situated on a narrow strip of land between the Bristol to Exeter railway line and the motorway at junction 28, and are accessible from the M5, A373 and B3181 roads. The junction at the southbound exit slip road is a very simple design with low traffic capacity. Unusually the service area is signed from the northbound carriageway but not from the southbound one, to reduce congestion at the low capacity service station, although it is readily accessible from both directions.

== History ==
The site opened in 1999. A Little Chef used to operate at this location, but was closed in 2003.

In 2006 the service area was criticised by Which? magazine as being the worst in the country. The 2019 Motorway Services User Survey found that Cullompton was in the bottom five motorway services in the UK for customer satisfaction.

In June 2025, it has been reported that Cullompton railway station will be built close to the service station.

Previous: Taunton Deane	Motorway service stations on the M5 Motorway	Next: Exeter
