= Derby South services =

Motorway service area in Derbyshire, England

Derby South Services
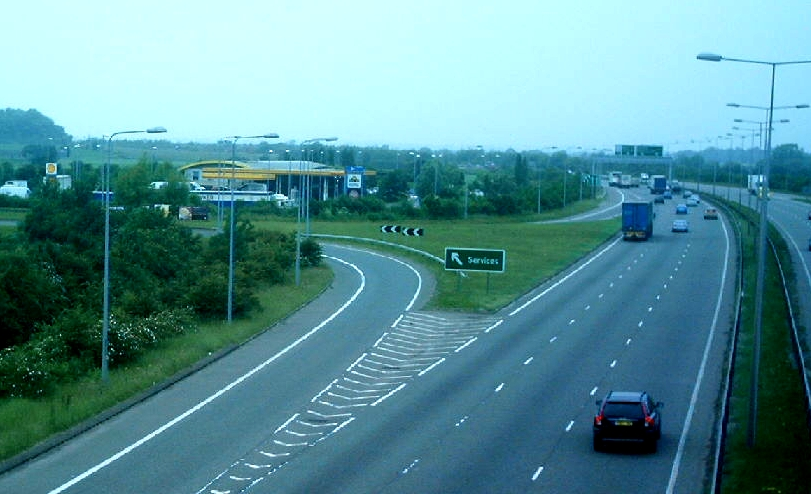
- The Services on the A50

- Location within Derbyshire

Information
- County: Derbyshire
- Road: A50
- Coordinates: 52.8679°N 1.3690°W
- Operator: Welcome Break
- Website: Welcome Break

The Derby South services are two service stations run by Welcome Break on either side of the A50 road. The services are located in South Derbyshire, near the villages of Shardlow and Aston-on-Trent.
