= Rugby services =

Motorway service station in Warwickshire, England

Rugby Services
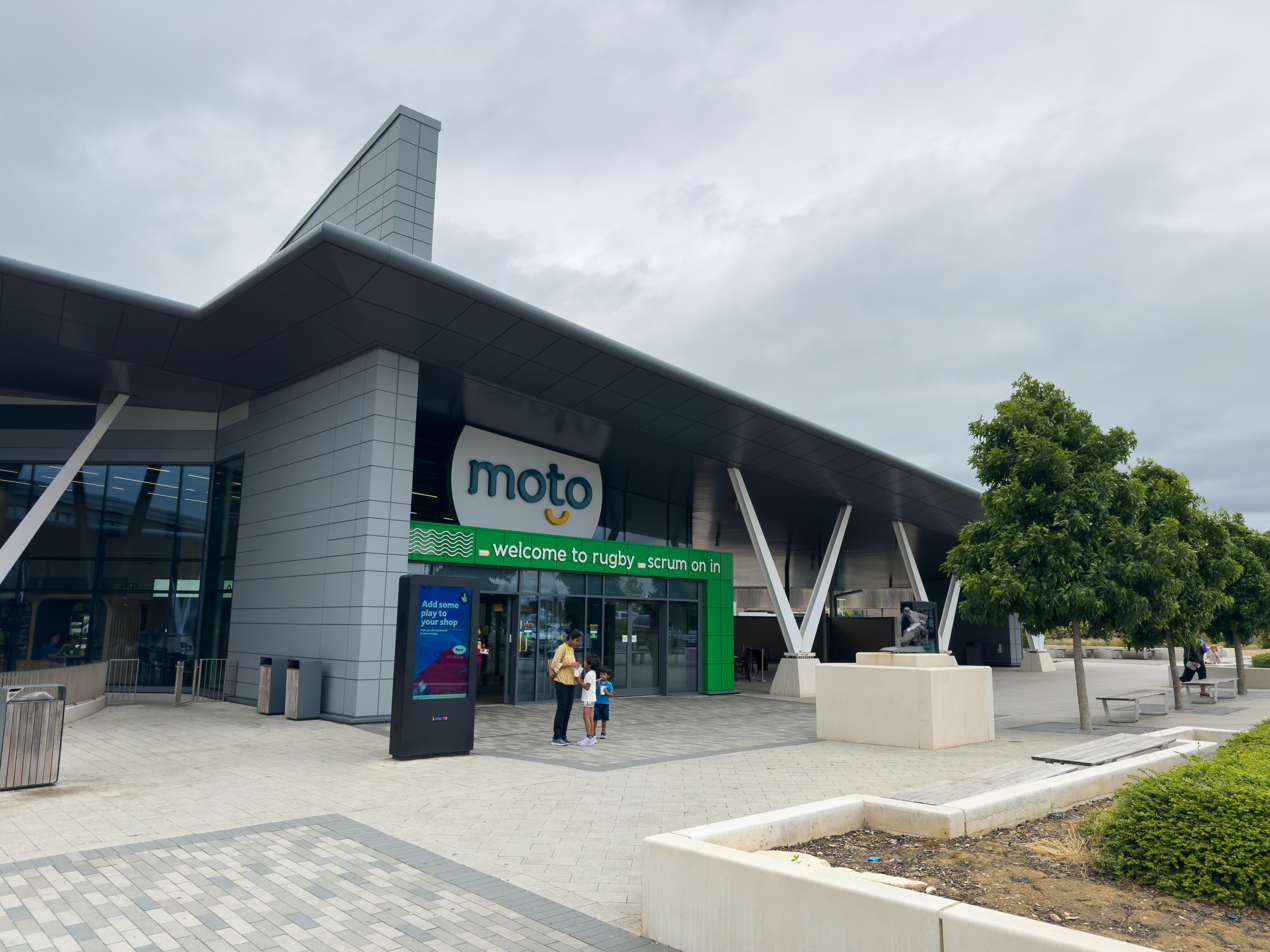

- Location within Warwickshire

Information
- County: Warwickshire
- Road: M6
- Coordinates: 52.4081°N 1.2457°W
- Operator: Moto Hospitality
- Date opened: 30 April 2021
- Website: moto-way.com/services/rugby/

Rugby services is a motorway service station operated by Moto Hospitality and situated at junction 1 of the M6 motorway in Warwickshire, England.

== History ==
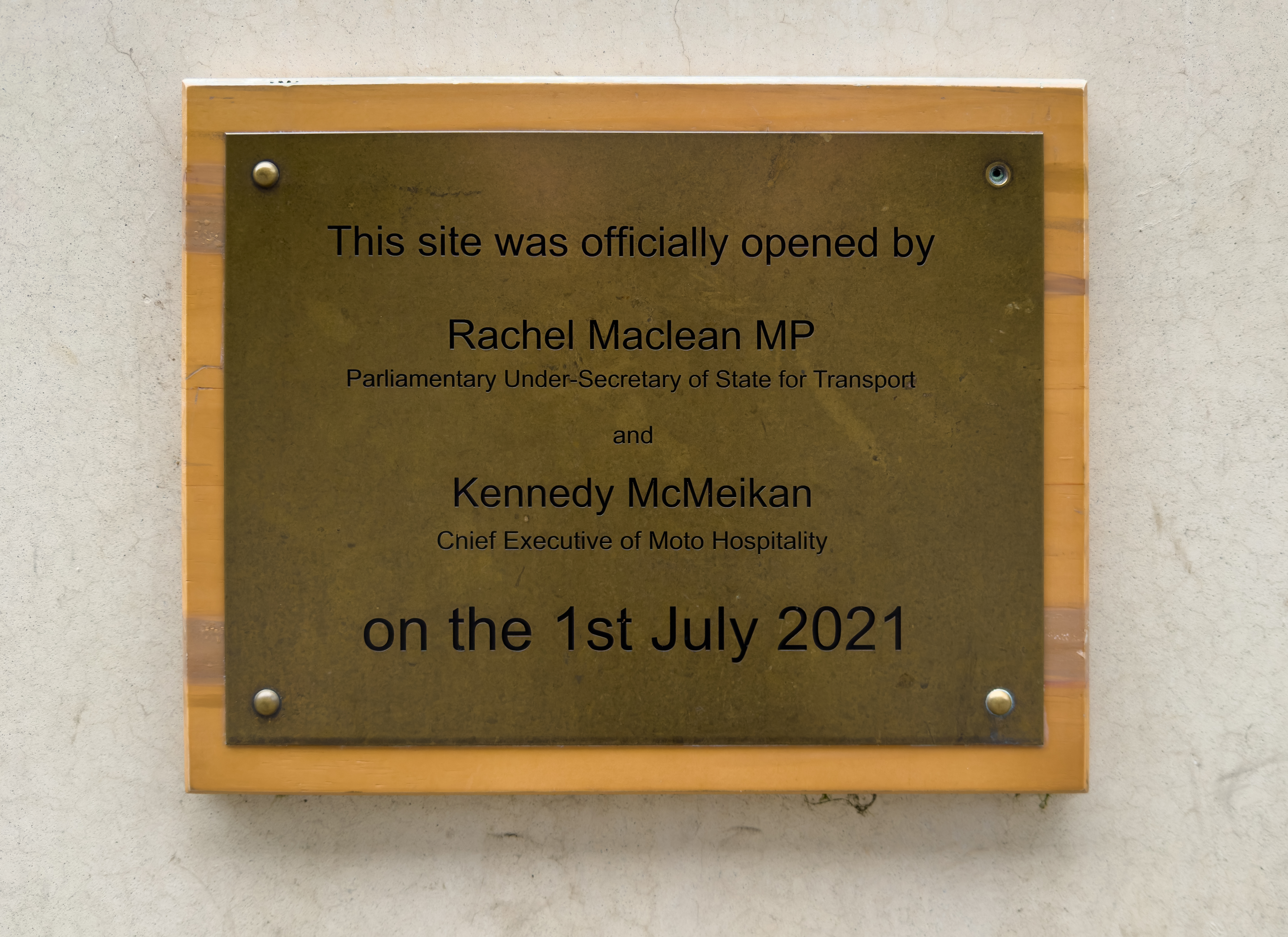
Plaque to the opening of the services by Rachel Maclean and Kennedy McMeikan on 1 July 2021

The services was built to fill one of the largest gaps without services on the major motorway network, whereby vehicles travelling south on the M6 and joining the M1 must travel for 25 miles (40 km) between Corley and Watford Gap. The proposed building of a services in the Rugby area dates back to 1975, when plans were put forward for a site at Harborough Magna, approximately two miles north of junction 1; the slip roads for the site were built and exist to this day, but the plan was shelved in 1980.

A further proposal was made in 2003 by Extra MSA Services, but was rejected by Warwickshire County Council as it would violate their green belt planning policy. A new plan by Moto was put forward in 2016 and approved in November 2017.

The services were due to open in 2020, but the COVID-19 pandemic meant that opening was delayed until 30 April 2021. In October 2022, the services was named the best in Britain by a survey of over 31,000 people by Transport Focus, the statutory watchdog for transport passengers and road users.

Next southbound: None on M6; Watford Gap on M1	Motorway service stations on the M6 motorway	Next northbound: Corley
