= Oxford services =

Motorway service station near Oxford, England

Oxford Services
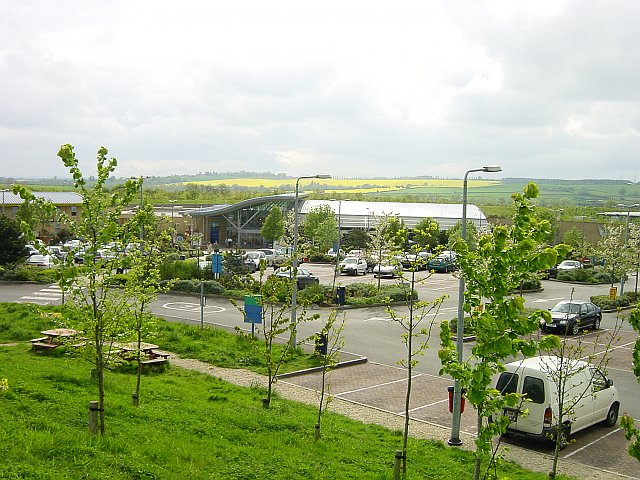
- Overlooking the car park at the main buildings.

- Location within Oxfordshire

Information
- County: Oxfordshire
- Road: M40
- Coordinates: 51.7391°N 1.0960°W
- Operator: Welcome Break
- Date opened: 1998
- Website: welcomebreak.co.uk/locations/oxford/

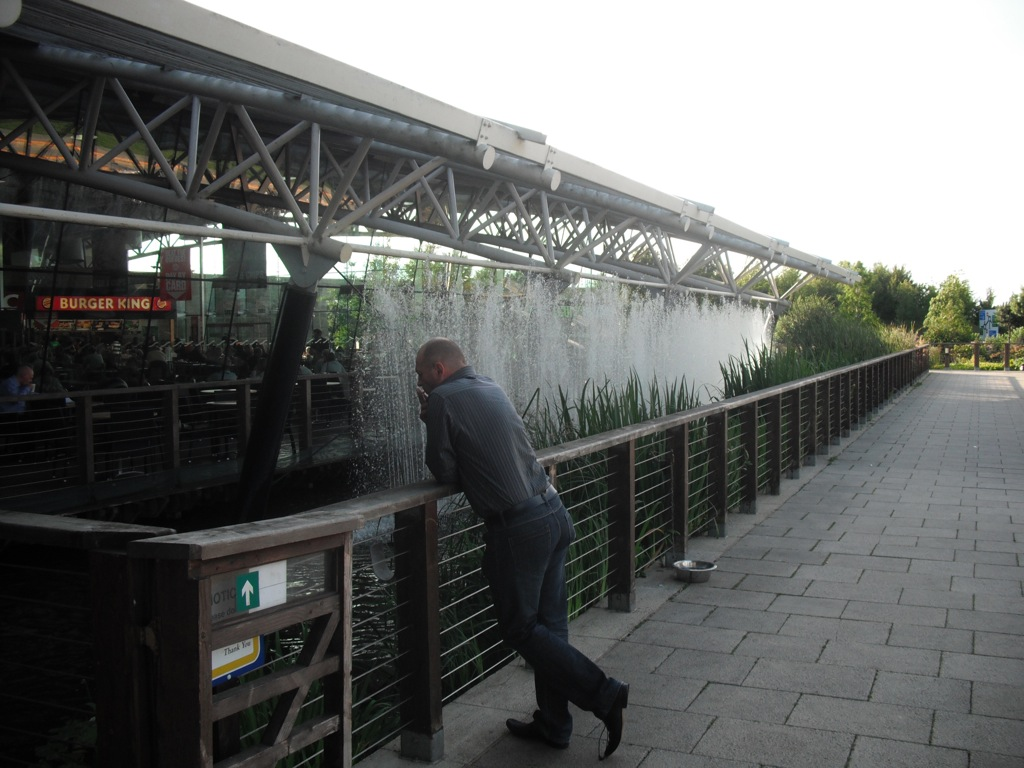
The Oxford Service Fountains.

Oxford services is a motorway service station next to junction 8A of the M40 motorway at Waterstock near Wheatley in Oxfordshire, several miles to the east of the city of Oxford. It is named after the nearby city of Oxford. The services are owned by Welcome Break and opened in the summer of 1998. It was the third of four service stations to open on the M40.

There is also a Ramada hotel on the site. There is also a Welcome Break area at the Peartree Roundabout. It is one of four services along the 89-mile M40 motorway; the others are Beaconsfield, Cherwell Valley and Warwick. It is also known as "Rippy Fountain" services, due to the water displays outside the park which are similar to the now defunct Ripsaw ride at Alton Towers.

== Sustainable Drainage System (SuDS) ==
Oxford Services is the site of one of the United Kingdom's pioneering fully integrated Sustainable Drainage Schemes (Sustainable Urban Drainage Systems). Designed by Robert Bray Associates, the SuDS system comprises a chain of basins, swales, filter strips, permeable paving and ponds. The system collects and treats surface water from roofs and parking areas before releasing it at a controlled rate into the local watercourse.

Oxford Services was also pioneering in its use of reclaimed water using lagoons to treat waste water to a quality level sufficient for re-use in flushing toilets. However, nitrate levels in the treated water gave it a yellow hue which was deemed undesirable in the facility's toilet bowls, so the recycling connection was stopped and the toilets switched to a mains water supply.

Next southeastbound: Beaconsfield	Motorway service stations on the M40 motorway	Next northwestbound: Cherwell Valley
