= Southwaite Services =

Motorway service station in Cumbria, England

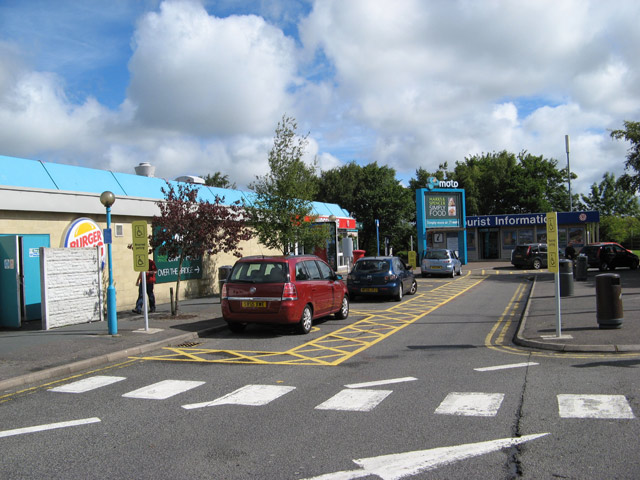
- The main services building

- Location in Cumbria, England Location in Eden District, Cumbria Location on the UK motorway network

Information
- County: Cumbria
- Road: M6
- Coordinates: 54.7977°N 2.8710°W
- Operator: Moto Hospitality
- Previous operators: Esso, Granada
- Previous name: Carlisle
- Date opened: 1972 (northbound); 1977 (southbound)
- Website: moto-way.com/services/southwaite-northbound/

Southwaite services is a motorway service station, between junctions 41 and 42 of the M6 motorway near Southwaite, Cumbria, England. It is about 7 miles (11 km) south of Carlisle, within the civil parish of Hesket

It is operated by Moto (it was owned and operated by Esso when the northbound base opened in 1972). A southbound base was added in 1977. Esso later sold the services to Granada. For a time in the 1990s the service area was briefly renamed Carlisle.

Southwaite has entrances from both the northbound and southbound carriageways of the motorway, and there are facilities built on both sides. A pedestrian footbridge connects the two sections of the service area. Both sides have a Burger King restaurant, WHSmith, M&S Simply Food and a Costa Coffee. The south side also has a Travelodge.

Next southbound: Tebay	Motorway service stations on the M6 motorway	Next northbound: Todhills
