= Woodall services =

Motorway service area in South Yorkshire, England

Woodall Services
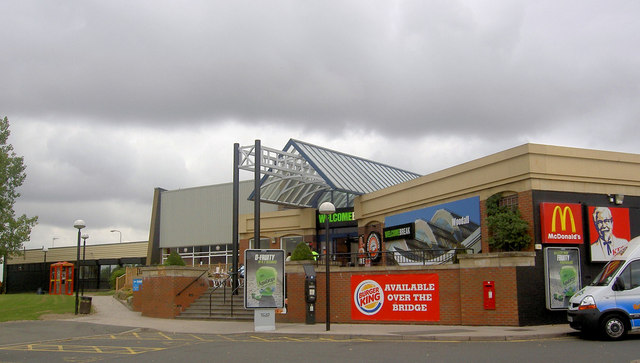

- Location in South Yorkshire, England Location on the UK motorway network

Information
- County: South Yorkshire
- Road: M1
- Coordinates: 53.3152°N 1.2813°W
- Operator: Welcome Break
- Date opened: 1968
- Website: welcomebreak.co.uk/locations/woodall/

Woodall services is a motorway service station on the M1 motorway in Rotherham close to Sheffield in England. It lies between junctions 30 and 31. It was opened in 1968 by Trust House Forte but was renamed Welcome Break after the takeover of the company. It takes its name from the nearby village of Woodall.

== History ==
The motorway section was planned to open in autumn 1967, and opened December 21 1967.

The contract awarded to Forte on Tuesday 29 June 1965, to open in autumn 1968. It was the sixth motorway service area contract to be awarded on the M1. By 1965 Forte operated Newport Pagnell on the M1, and Keele and Charnock Richard, on the M6. The architect was Riley and Glanfield of London.

The site opened around July 1968. Motorway Rescue Services opened an automotive repair site in March 1988.

=== Incidents ===
On 18 January 1986 Millwall F.C. fans, heading south, met Newcastle United F.C. fans, travelling north. The Millwall fans had been visiting Sunderland. 47 Millwall fans were arrested. The Newcastle United fans were returning from a QPR match. One Millwall fan attacked with a Stanley knife, and stole the victim's wallet, who was taken to Rotherham General Hospital.

== Facilities ==
The site is in Harthill with Woodall.

Woodall was also one of the few service stations to have a Burger King, KFC and a McDonald's. The Northbound side had a McDonald's (open 24 hours), which closed in March 2020, and has a KFC, with the Southbound side having a Burger King and a KFC. Both sides of the service station are linked by footbridge. The services are very close to the Derbyshire border but it actually lies in the Metropolitan Borough of Rotherham.

Woodall was one of two Welcome Break services which had a McDonald's; the other one was Fleet on the M3 in Hampshire.

The service station has 233 employees as of November 2019.

This service area has proven to be very popular with coaches heading north and south because of the coach hosts there.

== Layout ==
The MSA is accessible from both the Northbound and Southbound carriageways.

The MSA has murals by David Fisher in the 1990s, designed to reflect the local area and history.

Next southbound: Tibshelf	Motorway service stations on the M1 motorway	Next northbound: Woolley Edge
