= Todhills rest area =

Motorway service station in Cumbria, England

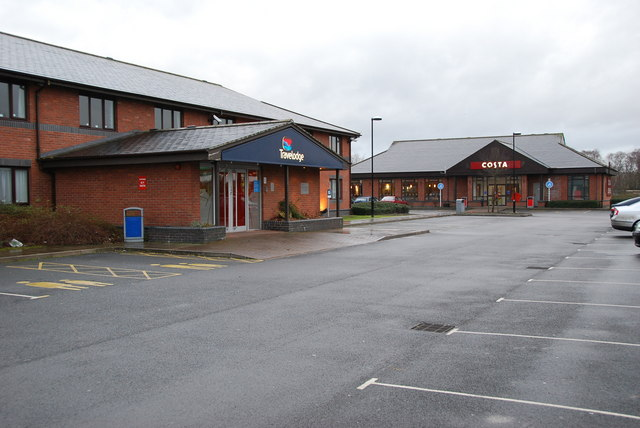
- Main Service Buildings (Southbound)

- Location in Cumbria, England Location in the former Carlisle district, Cumbria Location on the UK motorway network

Information
- County: Cumbria
- Road: M6
- Coordinates: 54.9513°N 2.9791°W
- Operator: Moto Hospitality
- Date opened: 1972–2008 (Southbound (A74)); 1980–2008 (Northbound (A74)); 2008–present (M6)
- Website: moto-way.com/services/todhills-southbound/

Todhills rest area is a rest area in between junctions 44 and 45 of the M6 motorway in England, unofficially referred to as Todhill services. The southbound facilities are operated by Moto Hospitality, and there is a Travelodge hotel named "Carlisle Todhills". It is the last services northbound on the M6 and the first southbound. It was first opened in the 1980s on the A74. When the M6 was extended in 2008, it was initially believed that Todhills would need to close so the road could be widened, but this did not prove to be the case, and the widening scheme was completed without having to close the rest area.

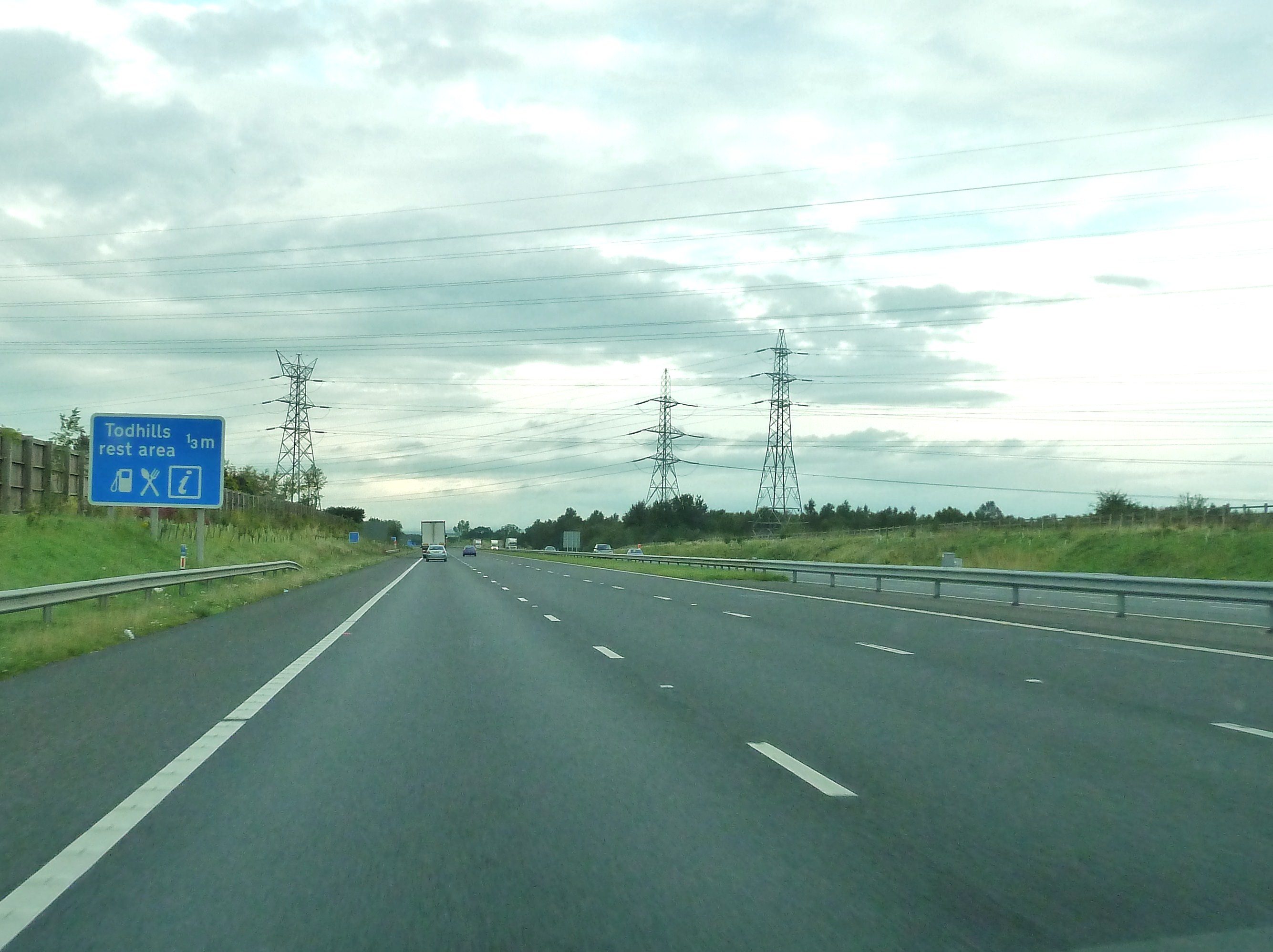
Northbound signage in 2011

Signage in 2011 indicated that the northbound area included petrol sales and refreshments.

Next southbound: Southwaite	Motorway service stations on the M6 motorway	Next northbound: None on M6; Gretna Green (A74(M))
