= Exeter services =

Motorway service station in Devon, England

Exeter Services
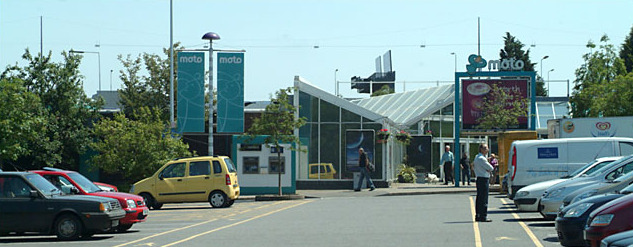
- The main services building

- Location within Devon

Information
- County: Devon
- Road: M5
- Coordinates: 50.7161°N 3.4641°W
- Operator: Moto Hospitality
- Date opened: 1977
- Website: moto-way.com/services/exeter/

Exeter services is a motorway service station on the M5 motorway in Devon, England. It is situated at junction 30 of the motorway, east of the city of Exeter, and is accessed from both directions of the motorway.

The service station opened in 1977 and is owned and operated by Moto Hospitality.

| Previous: Cullompton | Motorway service stations on the M5 Motorway | Next: none |
