= Chieveley services =

English motorway service station

Chieveley Services
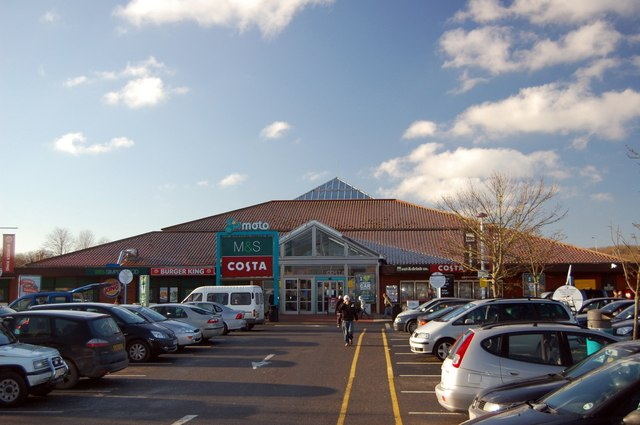

- Location within Berkshire

Information
- County: Berkshire
- Road: M4
- Coordinates: 51.4490°N 1.3112°W
- Operator: Moto Hospitality
- Date opened: 1986
- Website: moto-way.com/services/chieveley/

Chieveley services is a UK motorway service station just off the M4 motorway at Chieveley near Newbury in Berkshire, England. It is owned by Moto. It is situated on the A34 between Oxford and Winchester just off Junction 13 of the M4 (so that there is just one service area and not twin services on each side of the motorway). Thus it is used by traffic on both roads.

== History ==
This service area was not originally signed along the M4 as it was not operating 24 hours a day. Since the upgrade of the motorway junction, it is now signed.

Next eastbound: Reading	Motorway service stations on the M4 motorway	Next westbound: Membury
