= Warwick services =

Motorway service area in Warwickshire, England

Warwick Services
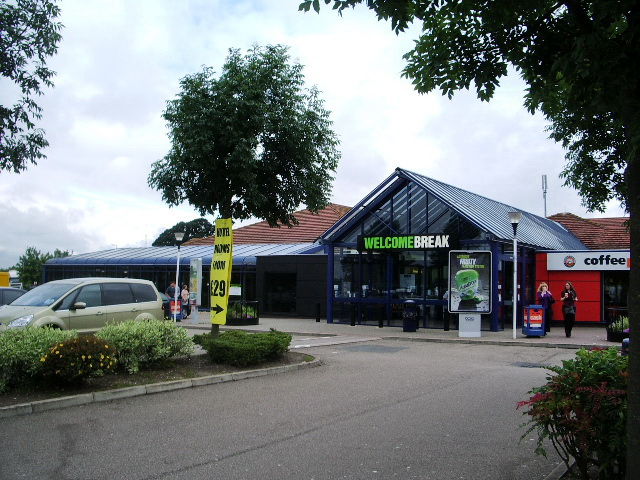

- Location within Warwickshire

Information
- County: Warwickshire
- Road: M40
- Coordinates: 52.2186°N 1.5029°W
- Operator: Welcome Break
- Date opened: 1996
- Website: welcomebreak.co.uk/locations/warwick-north/

Warwick Services is a motorway service station on the M40 motorway in Warwickshire, England. It is situated approximately 5 miles (8 km) south-east of Warwick and is owned by Welcome Break.

It is situated on two bases at each side of the motorway, and was opened in early 1996 as the second of four service stations which serve the M40. It was the second of four service stations to open on the motorway. The M40 northbound services are between junction 12 and 13.

Throughout 2007 the northbound Days Inn hotel was closed as the ground floor had completely flooded, although it has since reopened.

Until recently they had to be signed as 'Welcome Break Coffee Primo' as they only recently gained a KFC outlet. The southbound services were one of the first to gain a KFC facility.

== History ==
In March 2025 the services temporarily closed due to flooding.

== Cultural references ==
The northbound services featured in an episode of Top Gear.

Next southeastbound: Cherwell Valley	Motorway service stations on the M40 motorway	Next northwestbound: Hopwood Park (M42)
