= Burtonwood services =

Motorway service area in Cheshire, England

Burtonwood Services
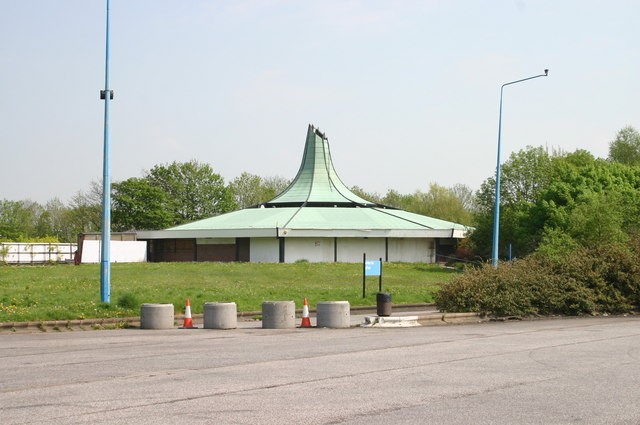
- The abandoned Westbound services

- Location in Cheshire, England Location on the UK motorway network

Information
- County: Cheshire
- Road: M62 Motorway
- Coordinates: 53.4171°N 2.6370°W
- Operator: Welcome Break
- Date opened: August 1974
- Website: welcomebreak.co.uk/locations/burtonwood/

Burtonwood services is a motorway service station on the M62 in Cheshire, near Warrington in England.

== History ==
The services originally opened in August 1974 with two sites, one each side of the motorway (the traditional layout of a British service station). The two distinctive conical-roofed buildings, one of which has since been demolished, were designed by the architect Patrick Gwynne. However, in 2008 the westbound side was closed, and traffic wishing to use the services now must use the opposite side, accessed from the roundabout. The former westbound site is now owned by a developer. in the mid-1980s bands travelling between Manchester and Liverpool often stopped at the services and the site became an autograph hunters' hub. Tears for Fears and Yazoo stopped regularly.

Around June 1988, it was renamed Welcome Break.

=== Construction ===
Forte was given the catering contract in September 1971.

Alfred McAlpine was given the £374,716 contract in early September 1972. Forte were always going to have the site. It was planned by the Motorways Group of Trust Houses Forte Catering Limited, headquartered at Newport Pagnell; it was hoped to open in early 1974, but by July 1974, it was planned to open in mid-August 1974. The site first planned by Fortes Service Areas Ltd.

It was built on part of the 13 mile South Lancashire Motorway section of M62 from Tar bock to Risley - the 100 acre Croft Interchange. The 27 month £15,920,634 contract had started in September 1971, by Leonard Fairclough and Alfred McAlpine. Thousands of tonnes of peat had to be excavated from Risley Mosslands, and deep stone dams were built. Earthmoving machines had to work on timber rafts, over the peat; the motorway section opened 30 November 1973.

=== Customer service ===
In August 2011 it was rated as two stars by quality assessors at Visit England. The 2019 Motorway Services User Survey found that Burtonwood was in the bottom five motorway services in the UK for customer satisfaction.

== Westbound site ==
The Westbound site was bought by Marshalls and is being redeveloped for commercial use. The development is to be known as Gemini 8. Tenants so far include a Travelodge motel and a Starbucks Coffee Outlet. Furthermore, a Harvester restaurant has opened. From July 2014 a new pub/restaurant operated by the Marston's Inns and Taverns chain called the Skymaster has opened. The development is accessed from Junction 8 and is located adjacent to Gemini Retail Park.

== Location ==
The services are located off junction 8 of the M62, access is from the roundabout from all directions.
