= Aston Rowant Cutting =

Road cutting

Coordinates: 51°39′42″N 0°56′17″W

- Site of Special Scientific Interest
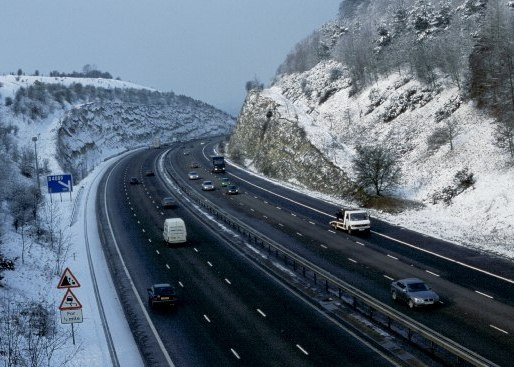
- Location of Aston Rowant Cutting.
- Area of search: Oxfordshire
- Grid reference: SU 732 964
- Interest: Geological
- Area: 3.5 hectares (8.6 acres)
- Notification date: 1986
- Location map: Magic Map

Aston Rowant Cutting is a 3.5-hectare (8.6-acre) geological Site of Special Scientific Interest south of Aston Rowant in Oxfordshire. It is a Geological Conservation Review site.

Aston Rowant Cutting, also known as the Stokenchurch Gap or Aston Hill cutting, or locally "The Canyon" is a steep chalk cutting, constructed through the Aston Rowant National Nature Reserve in the Chiltern Hills on the border between Buckinghamshire and Oxfordshire, England during the early 1970s for the M40 motorway. It is 1,200 metres (3,900 ft) long and a maximum of 47 metres (154 ft) deep, and is located approximately 13 kilometres (8.1 mi) from High Wycombe and close to the village of Stokenchurch. Despite the names, the cutting is in the parish of Lewknor rather than Aston Rowant or Stokenchurch. The cutting (along with the nearby village of Stokenchurch) is subject to frequent heavy fog during the winter months.

== Cutting ==
The cutting provides the best exposure in central England dating to the Coniacian stage of the Late Cretaceous, approximately 88 million years ago. It is part of the Upper Chalk succession, and at its base there is a fossil rich section which is important in defining the boundary between the Coniacian and the preceding Turonian stage.

Red kites are commonly seen flying within the cutting or on the surrounding downland, making their return after their persecution by game keepers in Victorian times following a successful reintroduction programme organised by the RSPB and Natural England, which selected the Aston Rowant NNR as one of four initial sites in the UK for a captive release programme using birds brought in from Spain. The scheme has been so successful that the population has grown to over 200 pairs and is now self-generating and supplies birds for similar release programmes elsewhere in the UK.

The cutting features prominently in the opening titles to the BBC comedy series The Vicar of Dibley.
