= Kinross services =

Motorway service area in Perth and Kinross, Scotland

Kinross Services
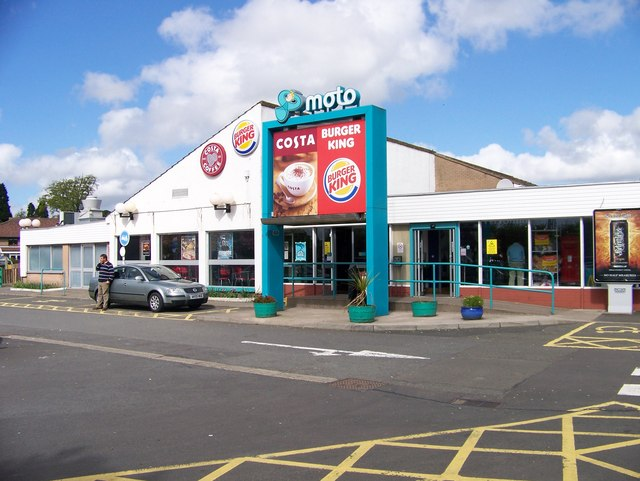

- Location within Perth and Kinross

Information
- County: Perth and Kinross
- Road: M90
- Coordinates: 56.2096°N 3.4393°W
- Operator: Moto Hospitality
- Date opened: 1982
- Website: moto-way.com/services/kinross/

Kinross services is a motorway service station near Kinross, Scotland. The service station is located next to the M90 motorway and is accessed using motorway junction 6 in both the northbound and southbound directions. It is owned by Moto.

It is the most northerly motorway service station in the United Kingdom.

== History ==
The services opened in 1982.

In 2011 it was announced that Moto planned to demolish and rebuild the services, with new access via a roundabout.
