= Cherwell Valley services =

Motorway service area in Oxfordshire, England

Cherwell Valley Services
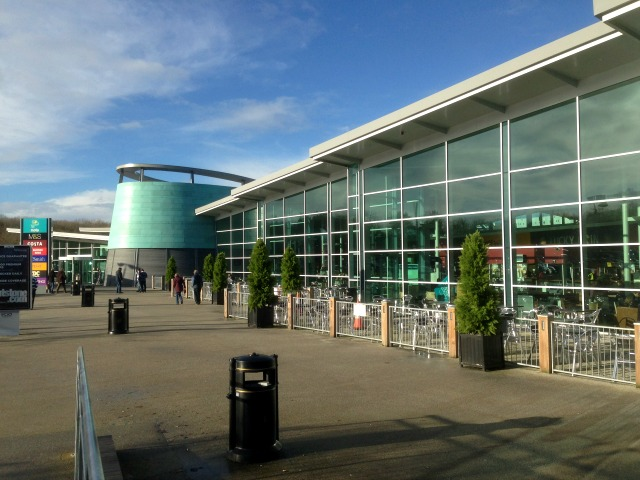
- The new building in 2013

- Location within Oxfordshire

Information
- County: Oxfordshire
- Road: M40
- Coordinates: 51.9491°N 1.1986°W
- Operator: Moto Hospitality
- Date opened: 1994
- Website: moto-way.com/services/cherwell-valley/

Cherwell Valley services is a motorway service station on the M40 motorway at Stoke Lyne, near Bicester, in Oxfordshire, England. In addition to the normal facilities provided by a motorway service station, the site also includes a Travelodge hotel in a separate building, together with a riverside walk.

== Location ==
The services are located at junction 10 of the M40, where the motorway intersects the A43 trunk road. The services lie to the east of this junction, and are accessed from the roundabout at the junction, meaning that they are accessible to non-motorway traffic. The next nearest services on the M40 are Warwick, to the north, and Oxford, to the south.

Despite its name, the services are neither in the valley nor the drainage basin of the River Cherwell, but rather beside a small east-flowing stream that becomes part of the Padbury Brook before joining the River Great Ouse at Buckingham.

== History ==
Cherwell Valley services, including the associated hotel, were opened in the spring of 1994 and gave the 89-mile motorway its first service station, more than three years after its completion. The site was previously occupied by a toilet facility, which had been there since the motorway's opening.

On 15 April 2010, a fire broke out in the main building. There were no casualties but the main building was destroyed. The hotel and fuel station were not affected. Temporary replacement facilities were introduced shortly after the fire, whilst construction of a new permanent replacement building started on 27 June 2010. The new building was completed in time to be opened on 30 June 2011, and is substantially larger than its 1994 predecessor.

== Gallery ==
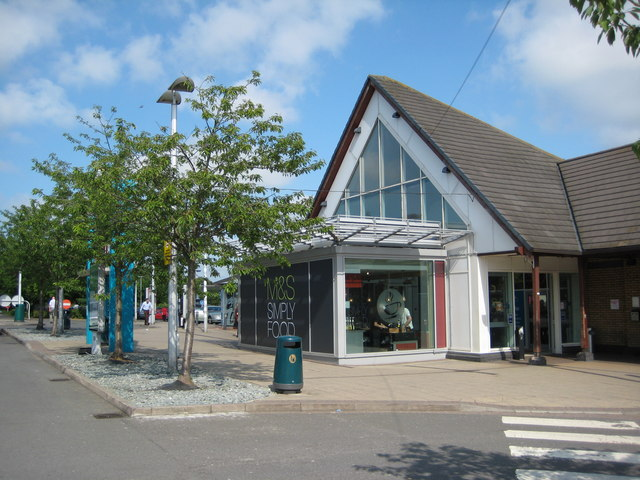
The former main building in 2008

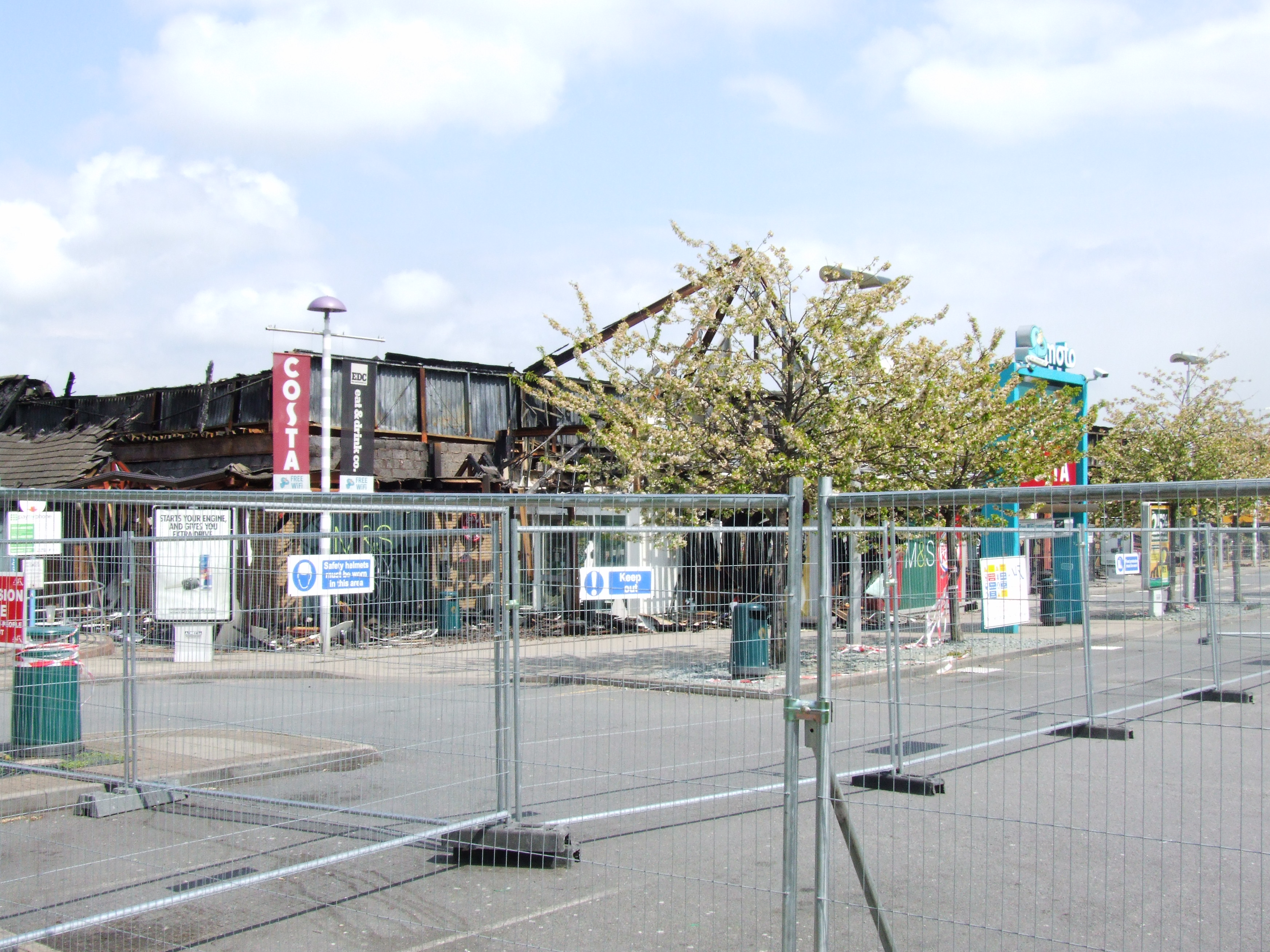
The former main building after the fire of 2010

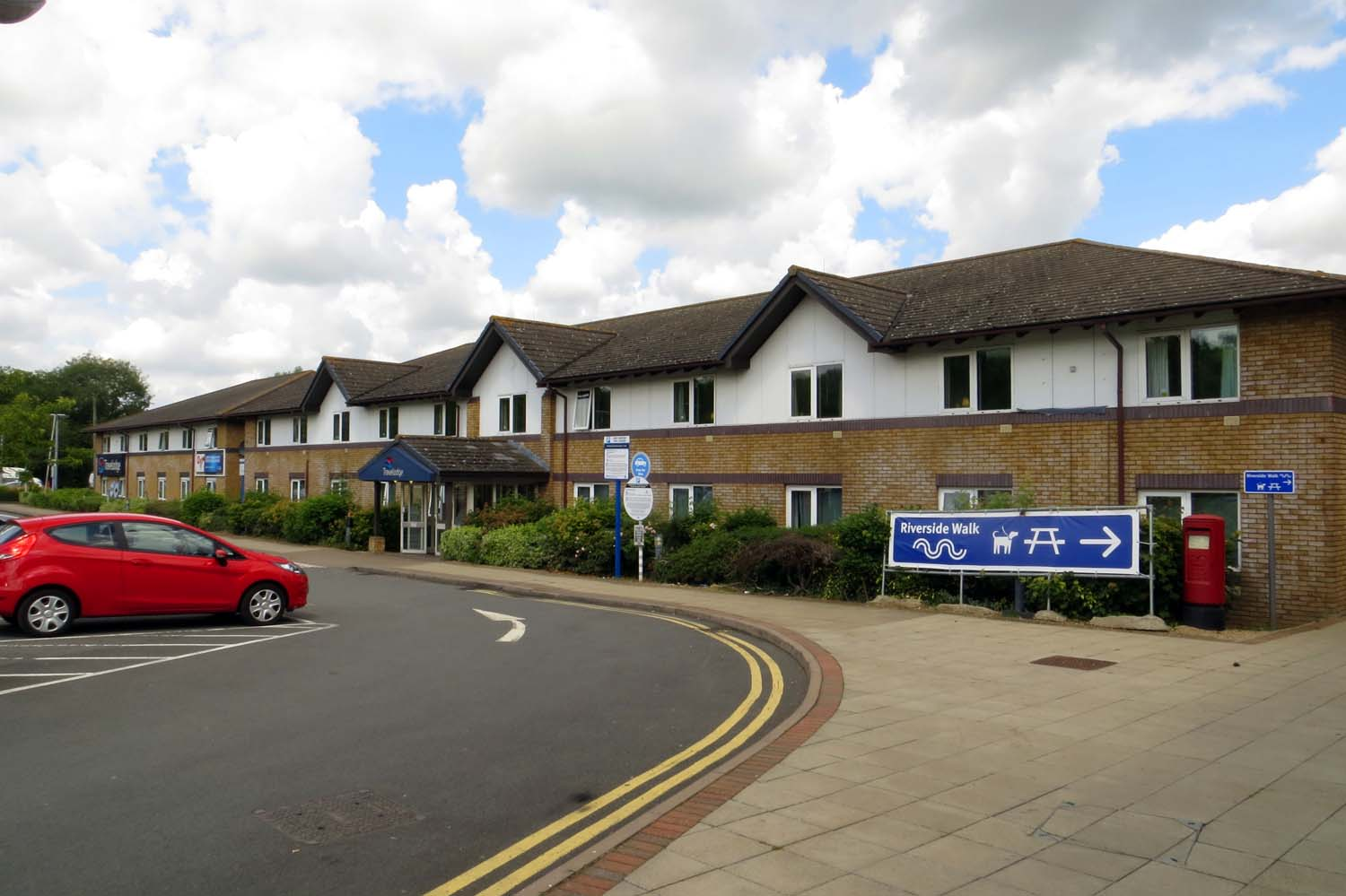
The Travelodge hotel in 2014

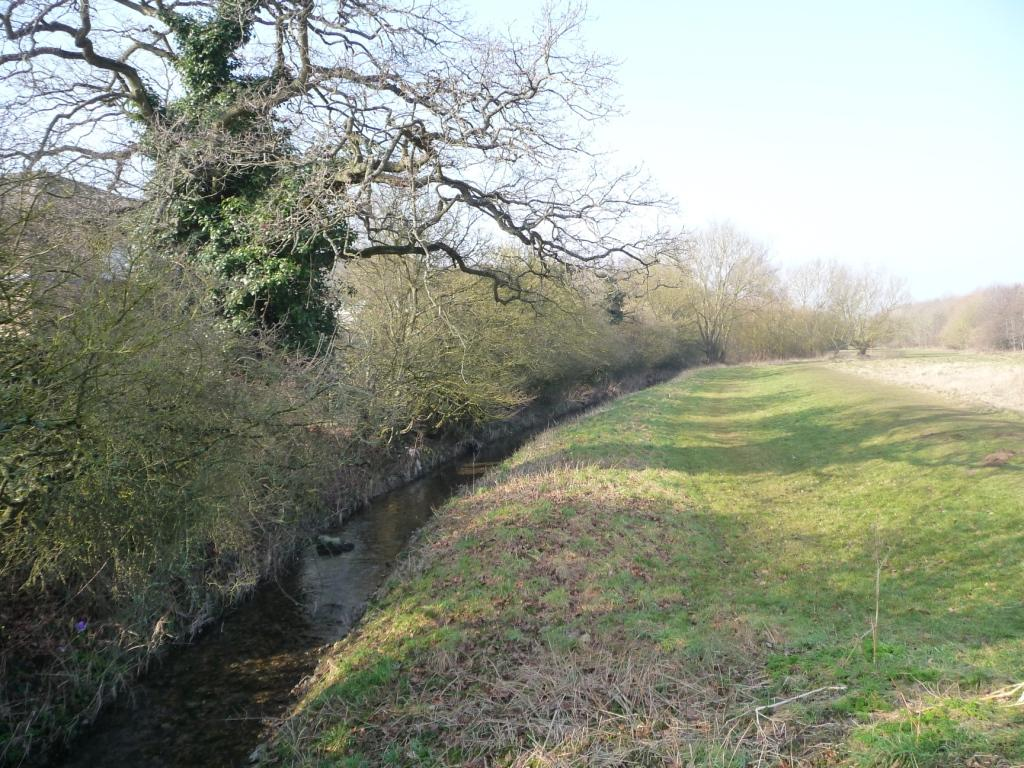
The riverside walk

Next southeastbound: Oxford	Motorway service stations on the M40 motorway	Next northwestbound: Warwick
