= Ferrybridge services =

Motorway service area in Yorkshire, England

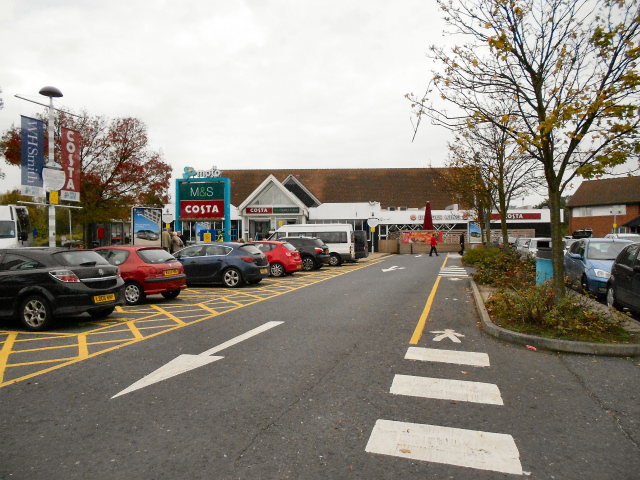
- Ferrybridge Service Area

- Location in West Yorkshire, England Location on the UK motorway network

Information
- County: West Yorkshire
- Road: M62; A1(M)
- Coordinates: 53.697°N 1.266°W
- Operator: Moto
- Previous operator: Granada
- Date opened: 2 April 1985
- Website: moto-way.com/services/ferrybridge/

Ferrybridge services is a motorway services area (MSA) operated by Moto named after Ferrybridge in West Yorkshire, England. The site has easy access from the M62 motorway and the A1(M) motorway. Originally opened in 1985 under the Granada brand, the MSA at Ferrybridge has been under the Moto brand since 2001.

== History ==
The services were opened by Granada in April 1985, becoming the thirteenth service station in operation for them at that time. The MSA was granted a 50-year lease from the Secretary of State for Transport in 1985. Prior to being the MSA, a bone manure works had operated from the site. In 2000, the services were branded the worst in Britain by the consumer magazine Which?, and a year later, in 2001, the site was relaunched under the Moto brand.

Although opened at the intersection of the M62 and the A1 road, due to the A1 not being a motorway at that time, the M62 took primacy, and the services were listed as an MSA for the M62 only. However, in 2006, the section of road from Ferrybridge to Hook Moor was upgraded to motorway status (from A1 to A1(M)). The old A1 road that passes adjacent to the services, is now designated as the A162. Access is available from all three roads, with the M62 from Junction 33, and the A1(M) from Junction 40.

== Facilities ==
Services at Ferrybridge are provided by the following:

- Burger King
- Costa
- Greggs
- Marks and Spencer
- WHSmith
- KFC

The site also has a fuelling station and a hotel/motel on site.

| Next southbound: Blyth | Motorway service stations on the A1(M) | Next northbound: Wetherby (A1(M)) |

| Next westbound: Hartshead Moor | Motorway service stations on the M62 motorway | Next eastbound: None eastwards |
