= Tamworth services =

Motorway service area in Staffordshire, England

Tamworth Services
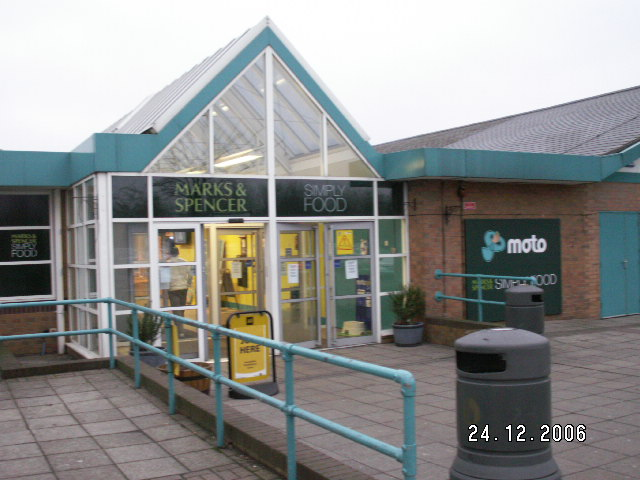
- General view

- Location within Staffordshire

Information
- County: Staffordshire, Warwickshire
- Road: M42, A5
- Coordinates: 52.6074°N 1.6404°W
- Operator: Moto Hospitality
- Previous operator: Granada
- Date opened: 1990
- Website: moto-way.com/services/tamworth/

Tamworth services is a motorway service station on the M42 motorway near Tamworth Staffordshire, England. The border between Staffordshire and Warwickshire runs through the middle of Tamworth Services. Tamworth Services opened in 1990. It is owned by Moto. The service station is situated off junction 10, and is thus accessible to non-motorway traffic via the A5.

Known brands include Greggs, a Marks and Spencer 'Simply Food' store, Burger King, Costa Coffee and WHSmith. There is also a Travelodge motel and a Ladbrokes bookmakers on site, not operated by Moto.
