= Burton-in-Kendal Services =

Motorway service station in Cumbria, England

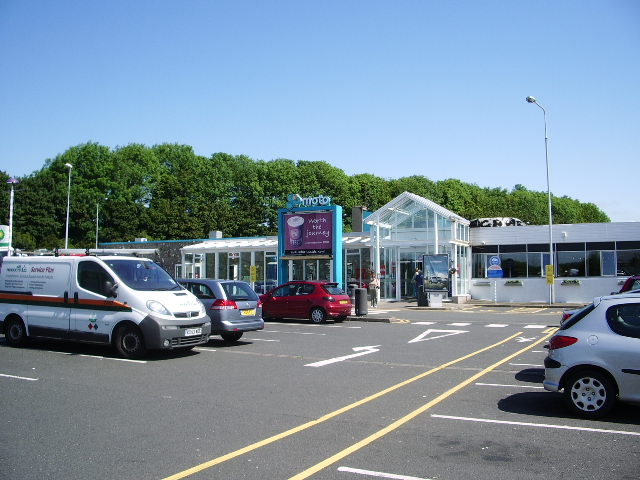
- The main building

- Location in Cumbria, England Location in the former South Lakeland district Location on the UK motorway network

Information
- County: Cumbria
- Road: M6
- Coordinates: 54.1781°N 2.7348°W
- Operator: Moto Hospitality
- Date opened: 23 October 1970
- Website: moto-way.com/services/burton-in-kendal/

Burton-in-Kendal services is a motorway service station on the M6 motorway in Cumbria, England, adjacent to the border with Lancashire. It is located about 4 miles (6 km) north of Carnforth, and approximately 0.5 miles (0.8 km) west of the village of Burton-in-Kendal from which it takes its name. It is accessible to northbound traffic only, with southbound traffic having to use Killington Lake services about 10 miles (16 km) north, or the facilities in the town of Carnforth just off the motorway. It opened on 23 October 1970, operated by Mobil Motorway Services. It is currently operated by Moto.

== Location ==
The services are located between junctions 35 and 36 on the M6, and is only available to northbound traffic.

Next southbound: Lancaster (Forton)	Motorway service stations on the M6 motorway	Next northbound: Killington Lake
