= Beaconsfield services =

Buckinghamshire service area on the M40 motorway

Beaconsfield Services
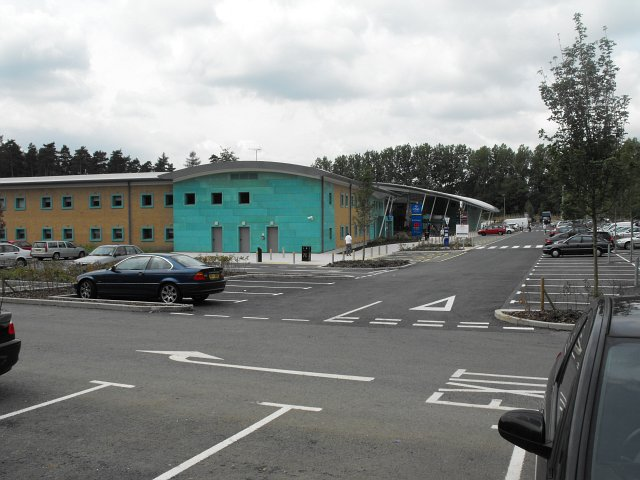

- Location within Buckinghamshire

Information
- County: Buckinghamshire
- Road: M40
- Coordinates: 51.590°N 0.628°W
- Operator: Extra MSA
- Date opened: 17 March 2009
- Website: extraservices.co.uk/locations/beaconsfield-services-m40-j2-m25/

Beaconsfield services is a motorway service station on the M40 motorway in Beaconsfield in Buckinghamshire, England. It is operated by Extra, and opened on 17 March 2009. It is the fourth and most recent of the service areas to be built on the 89-mile motorway which links London, Oxford and Birmingham. At its opening, it was the largest motorway service area in the United Kingdom. The petrol station with 36 pumps is also the largest filling station in the country. Petrol stations are provided by Shell and a hotel is operated by Ibis Budget.

== Access ==
Local residents feared that the new service station could bring traffic problems because the access is directly off junction 2, rather than the traditional method of locating services between junctions. Traffic leaving the service area to return to the motorway must cross the A355.

== Policing ==
Beaconsfield services is one of few sites to have a dedicated police community support officer on site for crime prevention. Swayfield (who own Extra) contribute half of the cost of the officer, backed up by security guards in the evenings.

Next southeastbound: None	Motorway service stations on the M40 motorway	Next northwestbound: Oxford
