= Folkestone services =

Service station

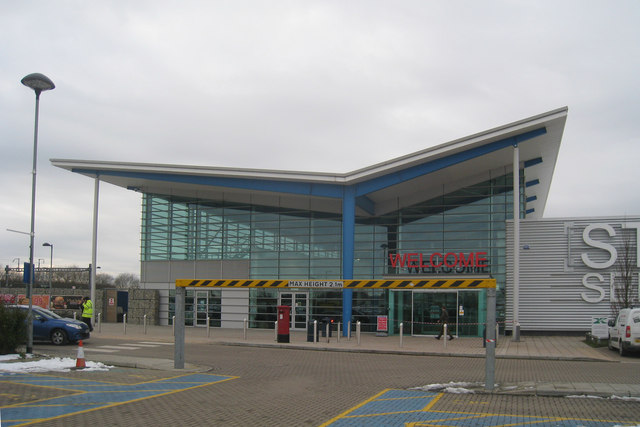

- Location within Kent

Information
- County: Kent
- Road: M20
- Coordinates: 51.095°N 1.045°E
- Date opened: 9 January 2008
- Website: stop24.co.uk

Folkestone services is a motorway service station on the M20 motorway at Westenhanger, seven miles from Folkestone in Kent, England. It was the second to be built on the motorway, and was opened on 9 January 2008. It is found off Junction 11; it contains a petrol station, parking for both cars and lorries, and a number of shops.

A lorry park with 230 parking spaces and customs clearance facilities provided by ChannelPorts Ltd has been operated on the site since 2011.

== History ==
The M20 motorway between junctions 10 and 13 was opened in 1981. Before the construction of the services, the proposed site was subjected to an archaeological investigation. This was because the area was close to known archaeological sites. Shards of pottery dating from the 1st–4th centuries were discovered, and there may have been a Roman settlement between the current site of the services and the line of the nearby Roman road from Lympne to Canterbury.

== Facilities ==
Folkestone Services has no on-site hotel.

=== Restaurants ===
- McDonald's - Drive Thru
- Costa - Drive Thru
- Subway
- KFC
- Noodle Stop Noodle Bar
- DonAir Kebabs
- The Breakfast Club
- Curried Away - Curry Bar

=== Petrol station ===
The petrol station at Folkestone Services is a Shell station.

=== Other facilities ===
- WHSmith
- Showers
- Toilets
