= Moto Hospitality =

British motorway service station operator

Moto Hospitality Limited
- Type: Private
- Industry: Hospitality
- Predecessor: Granada
- Founded: February 7, 2001; 25 years ago in Toddington, Bedfordshire, England, UK
- Headquarters: Toddington, England, UK
- Area served: Great Britain
- Key people: Ken McMeikan (CEO); Claire Catlin (CFO); Nick Tatum (CCO)
- Revenue: £791.282 million (2021)
- Owner: Universities Superannuation Scheme
- Number of employees: 5,120 (2021)
- Website: moto-way.com

Moto Hospitality Limited is a British service station operator which operates 70 motorway service stations across Great Britain. It is currently the United Kingdom's largest service area operator, serving more than 130 million customers each year.

Revenues grew to more than a billion pounds in 2024.

== History ==
On May 31, 2001, Moto Hospitality was founded by Compass Group, following Compass' demerger with Granada's hospitality sector in February 2001. The service stations that were previously known as Granada, were rebranded as Moto.

Upon rebrand, Compass originally intended to use the Moto brand across Europe. In 2003, they created a joint venture with Cremonini to introduce the Moto brand across Italy. In total, 31 Italian rest stops were rebranded Moto over a 3-year period. In 2007, Cremonini bought Compass' stake in the joint company, and rebranded the sites to their own brand, Chef Express. Briefly, in the early 2000s, there were also two French sites under the Moto banner.

In 2006, Moto separated from Compass Group and SSP following successful acquisition by a consortium of investors. Macquarie Bank managed Moto until late 2015, when the company was sold to USS.

In 2008, Moto opened a new service station on the A1(M) at Kirk Deighton near Wetherby, Yorkshire. Also in the same year, they purchased Winchester Services from Roadchef, rebranding the sites under their own name.

Moto's second new build services, at M6 junction 1 in Rugby, opened on 30 April 2021. The site introduced a new logo and corporate style - the first full update in the company's history.

Moto is currently in the development stage for its third new build service area at a site located near Sawtry, Peterborough, Cambridgeshire on the A1(M).

In 2021, Moto became a franchisee of Pret A Manger and started adding stores to its busier MSA locations.

In 2022, Moto invested £13.5m in refurbishing 5 of its MSA sites to the new logo and branding, refurbishment of toilet & shower facilities, customer seating areas and food outlets. All these sites had a KFC & Pret added to the food offering. Sites upgraded included Ferrybridge, Reading, Tamworth, Stafford & Donington Park.

== Facilities ==
=== Shops ===
Until 2007, Moto sites had an own-brand shop to sell products to travellers. After a trial of WHSmith at select sites was deemed successful, the brand was rolled out to most Moto sites, with some exceptions (Leeming Bar, Tiverton and Todhills).

In 2003, Moto launched a trial of Marks & Spencer Simply Food (now known as M&S Food) at Toddington. This proved successful, and the brand was introduced to most Moto sites from the following year.

In its early years, most Moto services also had a small shopping area featuring well known high street brands including Boots, Halfords, The Body Shop and Thorntons. These shops were removed by 2008 as Moto concentrated on its partnerships with M&S and WHSmith.

=== Catering ===
- Burger King is at all but two Moto sites (Todhills & Lymm). (Note: Lymm Services, which operates a McDonald's Drive-Thru instead of Burger King, along Leeming Bar, decided to instead house McDonald's drive-thru restaurants due to a contract with Roadchef including McDonalds, Costa Coffee and WHSmith, that decided Extra and Euro Garages, Likewise, fast food brands, such as KFC are often bringing more services as Todhills and Leeming Bar BK's closed)
- Costa Coffee operates at all Moto service areas.
- Greggs is at most Moto service stations. Moto also operates Greggs at four Extra motorway services as well.
- KFC is available at select larger Moto sites.
- Krispy Kreme operate stalls at most Moto locations.
- Pret a Manger is available at busier Moto service areas.
- West Cornwall Pasty Company now operates where all Upper Crusts used to be, except for Cherwell Valley, Wetherby and Reading Eastbound.

Moto locations previously featured a Little Chef as one of its flagship brands, but these began to be removed from 2008 in favour of introducing Costa Coffee; the last Little Chef in the Moto network to close was Toddington in 2010.

=== Other facilities ===
==== Barbershops ====
One site, Lymm, features a barbershop. Previously, Toddington and Leigh Delamere sites also opened but have since closed.

==== Betting arcades ====
In 1995, Granada thought that betting arcades would be useful at motorway services:

- Ladbrokes was the first brand used. Most outlets were closed in 2019.
- G-Scape was Granada's own brand betting arcade first introduced in 1998. The name continued to be used following Granada's rebrand to Moto until 2006, when it was replaced by Lucky Coin.
- Lucky Coin is Moto's own brand betting arcades. They appear at most sites.
- Full Hou$e is another Moto brand betting arcade, replacing some outlets of Lucky Coin.
- &Play is another own brand betting arcade, introduced in 2017.

=== Hotels ===
Most Moto locations have hotels:

- Travelodge operates at 56 Moto sites.
- Days Inn is at two Moto sites: Wetherby and Winchester. Winchester Days Inn was opened by Moto but is operated by Welcome Break.

=== Petrol stations ===
The petrol stations at Moto sites are variously Esso or BP.

=== Play areas ===
Selected Moto sites feature an indoor or outdoor play area within or near the main building. Outdoor play areas used to be more common but have been removed from sites for various reasons. Indoor play areas were first introduced to two service areas, Leigh Delamere Westbound and Donington, in 2016. Another indoor play area opened at Rugby in 2021.

== Other operations ==
Moto operates various franchise outlets at some Extra MSA services. These include M&S Simply Food, Costa Coffee, West Cornwall Pasty Company, Krispy Kreme and Greggs.

== Awards ==
Moto won awards for the quality of their internal training programme "Achieve In Moto" (AIM) at the Training Journal Awards in 2017. Moto won Gold in the category "Best Private/Commercial Programme" and also two Silver awards in the categories "Best Talent Development Programme" and "Best Operational Programme".

Moto have won awards for the standards of cleanliness in their public toilets, winning the 'Loo of the Year Award' in 2006 (for the fourth year running).

== Locations ==
Moto motorway service areas
- Barton Park - A1(M) J56
- Birch - M62 between J18 and J19
- Blyth - A1(M) J34
- Bridgwater - M5 J24
- Burton-in-Kendal - M6 between J35 and J36 northbound only
- Cardiff West - M4 J33
- Cherwell Valley - M40 J10
- Chieveley - M4 J13, A34
- Doncaster North - M18 J5, M180
- Donington Park - M1 J23a, A42
- Dover Port - A2, A20, Dover ferry terminal
- Exeter - M5 J30
- Ferrybridge - M62 J33, also accessible from A1(M)
- Frankley - M5 between J3 and J4
- Grantham North - A1, B1174 junction
- Heston - M4 between J2 and J3
- Hilton Park - M6 between J10a and J11
- Kinross - M90 J6
- Knutsford - M6 between J18 and J19
- Lancaster - M6 between J32 and J33
- Leeming Bar - A1(M) J51
- Leigh Delamere - M4 between J17 and J18
- Lymm - M6 J20, also accessible from M56
- Medway - M2 between J4 and J5
- Pease Pottage - M23 J11
- Reading - M4 between J11 and J12
- Rugby - M6 J1
- Scotch Corner - A1(M) J55
- Severn View - M48 J1
- Southwaite - M6 between J41 and J42
- Stafford Northbound - M6 between J14 and J15
- Stirling - M9 J9, M80 J9
- Swansea - M4 J47
- Tamworth - M42 J10
- Thurrock - M25 J30/J31, A13
- Tiverton - M5 J27
- Toddington - M1 between J11a and J12
- Todhills - M6 between J44 and J45
- Trowell - M1 between J25 and J26
- Washington - A1(M) between J64 and J65
- Wetherby - A1(M) J46
- Winchester (Owned by Roadchef until 2008) M3 between J8 and J9
- Woolley Edge - M1 between J38 and J39

=== Planned ===
- Sawtry - A1(M) J15

== See also ==
- Rest area
- RoadChef
- Welcome Break
- Extra
