= Hopwood Park services =

Motorway service station in Bromsgrove, Worcestershire, England

Hopwood Park Services

- Location within Worcestershire

Information
- County: Worcestershire
- Road: M42, A441
- Coordinates: 52.3721°N 1.9477°W
- Operator: Welcome Break
- Date opened: 1999
- Website: welcomebreak.co.uk/locations/hopwood-park/

Hopwood Park services is a motorway service station in Bromsgrove, Worcestershire, England situated off Junction 2 of the M42 motorway on the A441 road to Redditch south of Birmingham. It opened in August 1999. Services include a Shell Petrol Station, Waitrose, Starbucks Coffee, WHSmith, and KFC. Electric Vehicle charging is provided by Gridserve (2 chargers) and Tesla (16 chargers).

This motorway service area is operated by Welcome Break.

== History ==
Inside the services

Planning permission for the site was granted by Bromsgrove District Council in October 1998, work started two months later in December 1998, costing £40 million. When it was opened, it became the first service area in the country to include its own wildlife reserve.

== Reviews and criticisms ==
The independent Motorway Services Online has Hopwood Park down as the most popular service station, with visitors giving it an average rating of five stars (as of 2007).

The Holiday Which? magazine praised Hopwood Park for having a good variety of food, a smart cafe and staff who are helpful.

== Sustainable Drainage System (SuDS) ==
Hopwood Park was the site of one of the first fully integrated Sustainable Drainage Schemes (Sustainable Urban Drainage Systems) in the United Kingdom. Designed by Robert Bray Associates in conjunction with Baxter Glayster Consulting Ltd., the SuDS system comprises a chain of basins, swales, filter strips, and ponds. The system collects surface water from roofs and parking areas and is released at a controlled rate into the local watercourse where it is naturally treated and filtered via the vegetation through the various catchment ponds.
