= Welcome Break =

British operator of motorway service stations and hotels

Welcome Break Limited
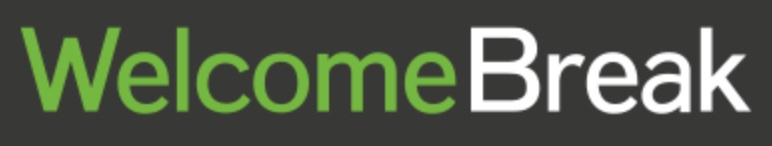
- Type: Subsidiary
- Industry: Hospitality
- Founded: 1959
- Headquarters: Newport Pagnell, England, UK
- Area served: United Kingdom
- Key people: John Diviney (CEO)
- Revenue: £630 million
- Number of employees: 4,500
- Parent: Applegreen
- Website: welcomebreak.co.uk

Welcome Break Limited is a British motorway service station operator that operates 35 motorway service stations in England, Scotland and Wales. It is the second-largest motorway service area operator behind Moto. It also operates hotels and motels. It is the UK arm of Irish motorways services operator Applegreen.

== History ==
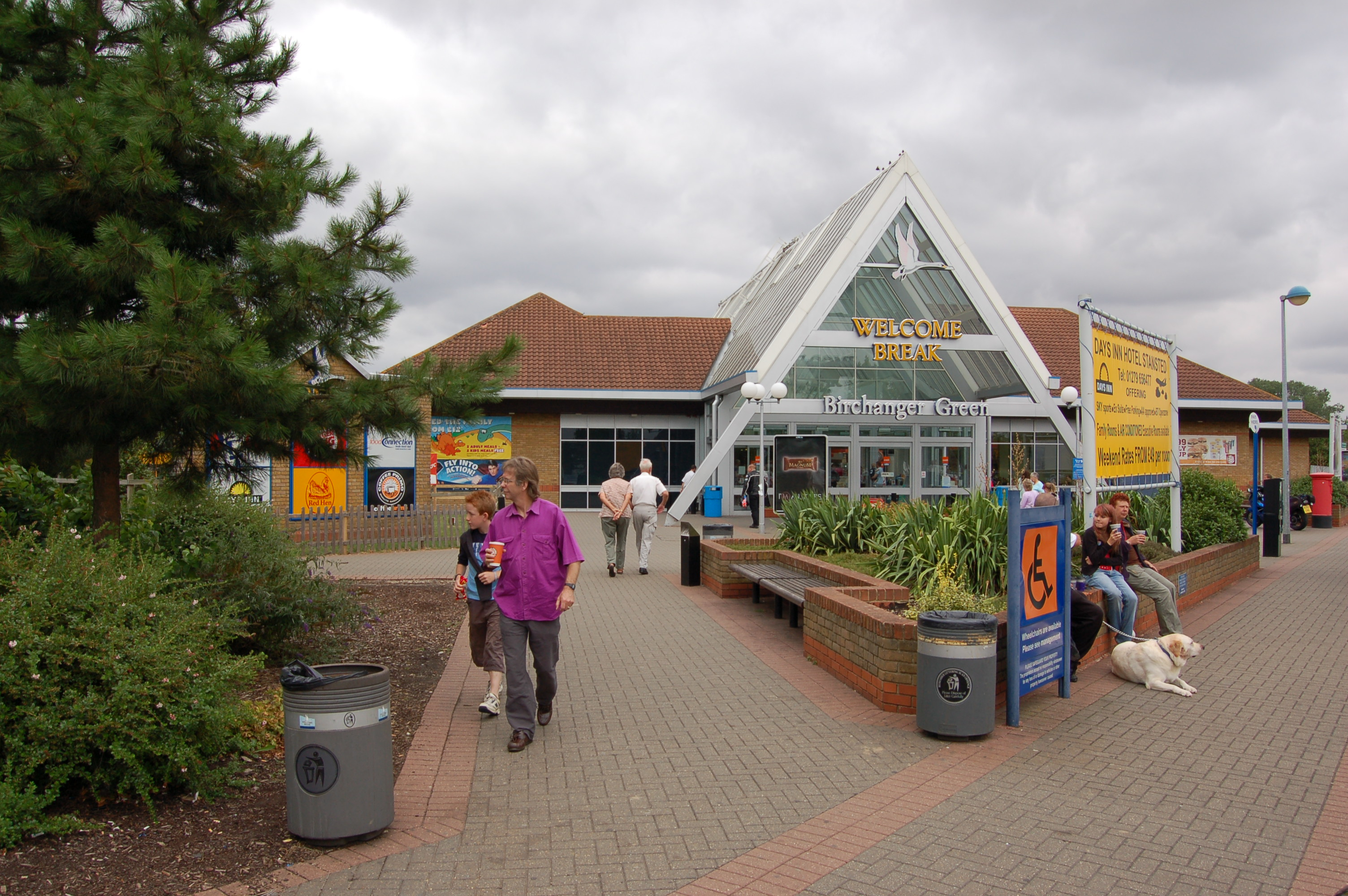
The Welcome Break facility at Birchanger services, Essex, 2006.

Opened in 1959, the service area at Newport Pagnell on the M1 motorway near Milton Keynes by Motorway Services Ltd was the company's first service area under the Forte name and was the second service area to be constructed on the fledgling UK motorway network, however it was still the first to open. The name "Welcome Break" came from a chain of rival restaurants to Little Chef, created by Allen Jones. These restaurants eventually either became Happy Eaters or closed. The name was brought back when Hanson Trust renamed Ross Food's service stations. The company's portfolio was expanded to five motorway service areas during periods under the ownership of the Imperial Group and subsequently the Hanson Trust before being purchased by Trusthouse Forte in 1986. Under this deal, the Welcome Break name was adopted across the entire estate, with Trusthouse Forte's sixteen existing service areas re-branded.

=== Split from Trusthouse Forte ===
In January 1996, the Forte Group was the subject of a £3.9 billion hostile takeover by the British media group Granada. Due to Granada's existing major presence in the motorway services market, a subsequent investigation by the Monopolies and Mergers Commission ordered Granada to sell 27 of the Welcome Break sites. The company was eventually bought by Investcorp in 1997 for £476 million. Investcorp then sold Welcome Break to Appia Investments in March 2008 for £500M.

=== Applegreen ownership ===
In August 2018, petrol services operator Applegreen agreed to purchase the majority of Welcome Break for €361.8M.

In 2025, Applegreen agreed to sell Petrogas Group to EG On The Move, Welcome Break was not part of the deal and will become the UK arm of Applegreen.

== Facilities ==
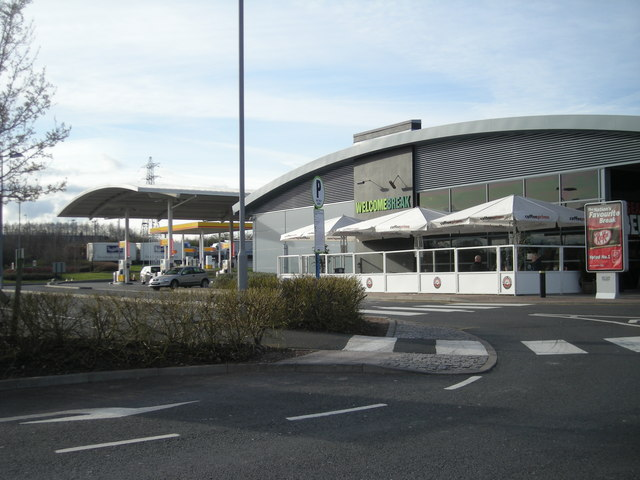
The main building at Welcome Break's Telford services

The facilities available at Welcome Break service areas varies at each site, with most sites open 24 hours a day throughout the year. Typically, each service area comprises a café or restaurant, a retail outlet, a hotel and a petrol station. Most sites have WHSmith, a food court comprising popular fast food outlets such as Burger King, KFC and Subway, a Starbucks coffee shop, and a Welcome Break branded petrol station.

=== Hotels ===
The majority of hotels at Welcome Break service areas are franchises of Days Inn or Ramada; many of these were once branded under Welcome Break's own brand, "Welcome Lodge"; the last of these, at Newport Pagnell and Charnock Richard, were rebranded to Days Inns in May 2009 and also took over operation of three former PURPLE hotels at Cambridge, Peterborough, and Stevenage in July 2009, each three have reopened as Days Inn taking its total to 26. In September 2012, Welcome Break opened a Days Inn at the new Cobham Service area on the M25, and 2013 saw a rebrand of Days Hotel London North and Days Inn London Stansted into Ramada hotels. In December 2014, Welcome Break purchased Days Hotel Wakefield, and after a full refurbishment it was reopened as Ramada Wakefield in January 2015.

=== Catering ===
When the Welcome Break chain was sold by Granada, branches of Little Chef at those sites were replaced a similar table service restaurant, Red Hen. High prices earned the chain the nickname "Little Thief".

Eat In became Welcome Break's own brand self-service restaurant. However, these have since been replaced with food courts, featuring a selection of brands varying from location to location:

- Subway was opened at 15 Welcome Break sites from January 2015 to May 2015.
- Harry Ramsden's, a UK-based fish and chip restaurant (also offering a range of breakfast to eat in or take away), was included at the majority of sites however these closed in 2020 and have now been replaced with 'The good Breakfast' which is welcome breaks own brand Breakfast outlet offering traditional fry-ups.
- Waitrose has franchise stores at most Welcome Breaks.
- Starbucks is now available in most Welcome Break services. Some services have drive-through Starbucks in separate buildings.
- Welcome Break is a long-standing KFC licensee, operating KFC fast food restaurants at 24 of its service areas. In May 2005, Welcome Break announced a deal with KFC designed to bypass tough UK motorway signage legislation. UK law used to prevents motorway service area operators from displaying additional brand names other than their own company name on roadside signage. To circumvent this restriction, a new subsidiary company "Welcome Break KFC" was registered. However now it is legal to have up to 6 logos on motorway service station signs.
- Burger King restaurants operate at all Welcome Break service stations except Burtonwood and Derby South.
- In 1995, it was announced that a McDonald's would be added to every location, but the process was stopped after just two because Forte were acquired by Granada (now Moto), a deal which included Welcome Break and lost out to Burger King being added instead. There are no longer any McDonald's branches at Welcome Break sites, with the last two (at Fleet services and Woodall services) closing in March 2020. This was due to a licensing agreement with Burger King that prevents a McDonald's from operating at any site with a Burger King.
- Chopstix, which was first introduced in August 2016 at Birchanger Green and now has a few branches at other services.

=== WHSmith ===
Recently, Welcome Break service areas have followed the industry-wide trend towards partnership with High Street brands. W H Smith stores have been introduced at the majority of Welcome Break sites as a replacement for the traditional unbranded retail outlets. Initially launched as a trial store at the Newport Pagnell site in February 2007, W H Smith stores have now been rolled out across the Welcome Break portfolio. In May 2025, Toys R Us was added to 5 Whsmith stores as an expansion of the partnership between the two companies.

=== Fone Bitz ===
Fone Bitz sell electronics across the motorway network and operate at most Welcome Break sites. Fone Bitz sell a range of Mobile Phone, iPad, iPod, Laptop, electronic and car accessories in general.

=== Welcome Break Gaming ===
Welcome Break Gaming is a self branded betting arcade located at all Welcome Break sites, except the Welcome Break operated Days Inn hotels and motels.

=== Electric vehicle charging ===
In July 2011, Ecotricity announced it would provide charging stations for electric vehicles at Welcome Break facilities between London, Exeter, and Edinburgh, marketed as part of its 'Electric highway' network of 27 sites.

In July 2021, it was announced that Gridserve had purchased Ecotricity's "Electric Highway" charging network. Gridserve agreed to maintain the network's relationship with Welcome Break, and will start updating charge points to include contactless payment and faster chargers.

In March 2022, the CMA noted that Gridserve was not investing in installing ultra-rapid chargepoints at Welcome Break sites due to business decisions regarding risk, as the agreement with Welcome Break was non-exclusive. The CMA noted that other operators such as Instavolt had installed chargepoints at some Welcome Break locations. As of 2024, Welcome Break sites also host EV chargers from a range of other providers.

== Logo ==
Welcome Break logo until September 2006.

Welcome Break logo used from 2006 to 2020

Welcome Break introduced a new company logo in September 2006. The swan, integral to the previous company logo, has been removed. The new logo features a black background with the words 'welcome' and 'break' in green and white respectively. Each site now also has a large mural depicting a local landmark unique to that site. Many of these were commissioned from artist David Fisher.

In 2020, the logo was updated to be similar to the Applegreen logo.

== Locations ==
=== England, Scotland and Wales ===
- Abington – M74 J13
- Birchanger – M11 J8
- Burtonwood – M62 J8
- Cardiff Gate – M4 J30
- Charnock Richard – M6 between J27 and J28
- Corley – M6 between J3 and J4
- Derby South – A50 between J1 and J2
- Fleet – M3 between J4a and J5
- Gordano – M5 J19
- Gretna Green – A74(M) between J21 and J22
- Hartshead Moor – M62 between J25 and J26
- Hopwood Park – M42 J2
- Keele – M6 between J15 and J16
- Leicester Forest East – M1 between J21 and J21a
- London Gateway – M1 between J2 and J4
- Membury – M4 between J14 and J15
- Michaelwood – M5 between J13 and J14
- Newport Pagnell – M1 – between J14 and J15
- Oxford – M40 J8a
- Peartree – A34 junction with A44
- Rotherham - M1 J33
- Sarn Park – M4 J36
- Sedgemoor (Northbound) – M5 between J21 and J22
- South Mimms – M25 J23, A1(M) J1
- Telford – M54 J4
- Warwick – M40 between J12 and J13
- Woodall – M1 between J30 and J31

=== Northern Ireland (branded as Applegreen) ===
- Ballymena
- Hillsborough
- Lisburn (north and south)
- Templepatrick

== See also ==
- RoadChef
- Moto
- Extra
- Motorway service station
