= M40 motorway =

British motorway connecting London and Birmingham

M40

- M40 highlighted in blue Shown with UK motorway network

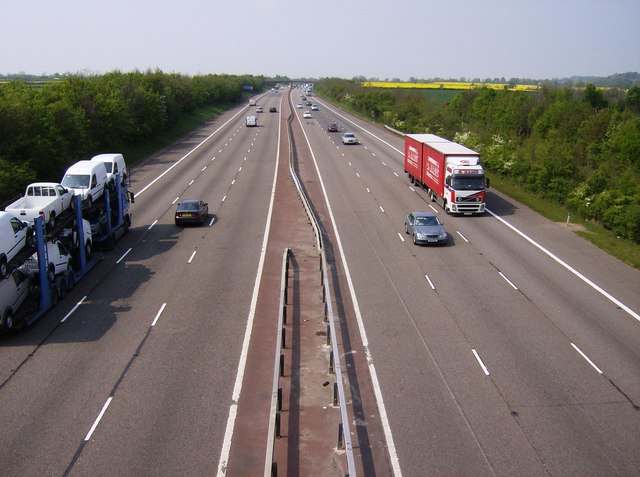
- Looking north at Warmington, Warwickshire, 2007

Route information
- Part of E05
- Maintained by National Highways
- Length: 89 mi (143 km)
- Existed: 1967–present
- History: Opened: 1967; Completed: 1991

Major junctions
- Southeast end: Denham
- J1 -> A40 road J1a → M25 motorway; J4 -> A404 road J7 -> A329 road J17 → M42 motorway
- Northwest end: Tanworth in Arden

Location
- Country: United Kingdom
- Counties: Buckinghamshire, Oxfordshire, Northamptonshire, Warwickshire
- Primary destinations: London; Uxbridge; Beaconsfield; High Wycombe; Oxford; Banbury; Leamington Spa; Warwick; Birmingham

Road network
- Roads in the United Kingdom; Motorways; A and B road zones

The M40 motorway links London, Oxford, and Birmingham in England, a distance of about 89 miles (143 km).

The motorway is dual three lanes except for junction 1A to junction 3 (which is dual four lanes) a short section in-between the exit and entry slip-roads at junction 4 (which is two lanes in both directions) and also between the slip-roads at junction 9 (in the south-eastbound direction only).

An Active Traffic Management system operates on the short section north-westbound from junction 16 (A3400) to the M42.

== History ==
=== London to Great Milton ===
The motorway between London and Oxford was constructed in stages between 1967 and 1974. The first section opened in June 1967, from Handy Cross roundabout, High Wycombe to Stokenchurch (junctions 4–5). In 1969, extending in a southerly direction to Holtspur, Beaconsfield, a temporary junction 2 was opened. The section bypassing Beaconsfield was built in 1971 and the section past Gerrards Cross to junction 1 was completed in 1973. In 1974, the motorway between junctions 5 to 8 was completed to Great Milton.

Between junctions 3 and 4, the beginnings of slip roads were built on both carriageways for a service area at Abbey Barns between Beaconsfield and High Wycombe. Beaconsfield services off junction 2 opened in 2009.

=== Great Milton to Birmingham ===
Late in the 1960s, not long after the first stretch opened, the Ministry of Transport announced the possibility of building a new motorway to link London with Birmingham as an alternative to the M1–M6 route – as well as improving road links to the South Coast ports for The Midlands – but it was not until December 1984 that the decision to extend the M40 from Oxford to the south of Birmingham was given the go-ahead, with the anticipation of the route being built in three phases and being fully operational by 1990.

The preferred route was altered to avoid Otmoor after a vigorous road protest, which included selling over 3,000 small squares of a field to people all over the world. The field had been renamed 'Alice's field' as a reference to Alice in Wonderland by Lewis Carroll who lived in the area at the time of the book's writing.

Construction began at Warwick in October 1987, with work on the section around Banbury starting in February 1988, and finally, the section north of Oxford in July 1989. The 12-mile section between the M42 and Warwick opened in December 1989, and the remaining 48-mile section in January 1991. The section between Banbury and Warwick had been completed several months earlier, but its opening was delayed until the Banbury to Oxford section was ready, to avoid the inevitable congestion of A-roads in north Oxfordshire towards the end of 1990 that an earlier opening would have caused.

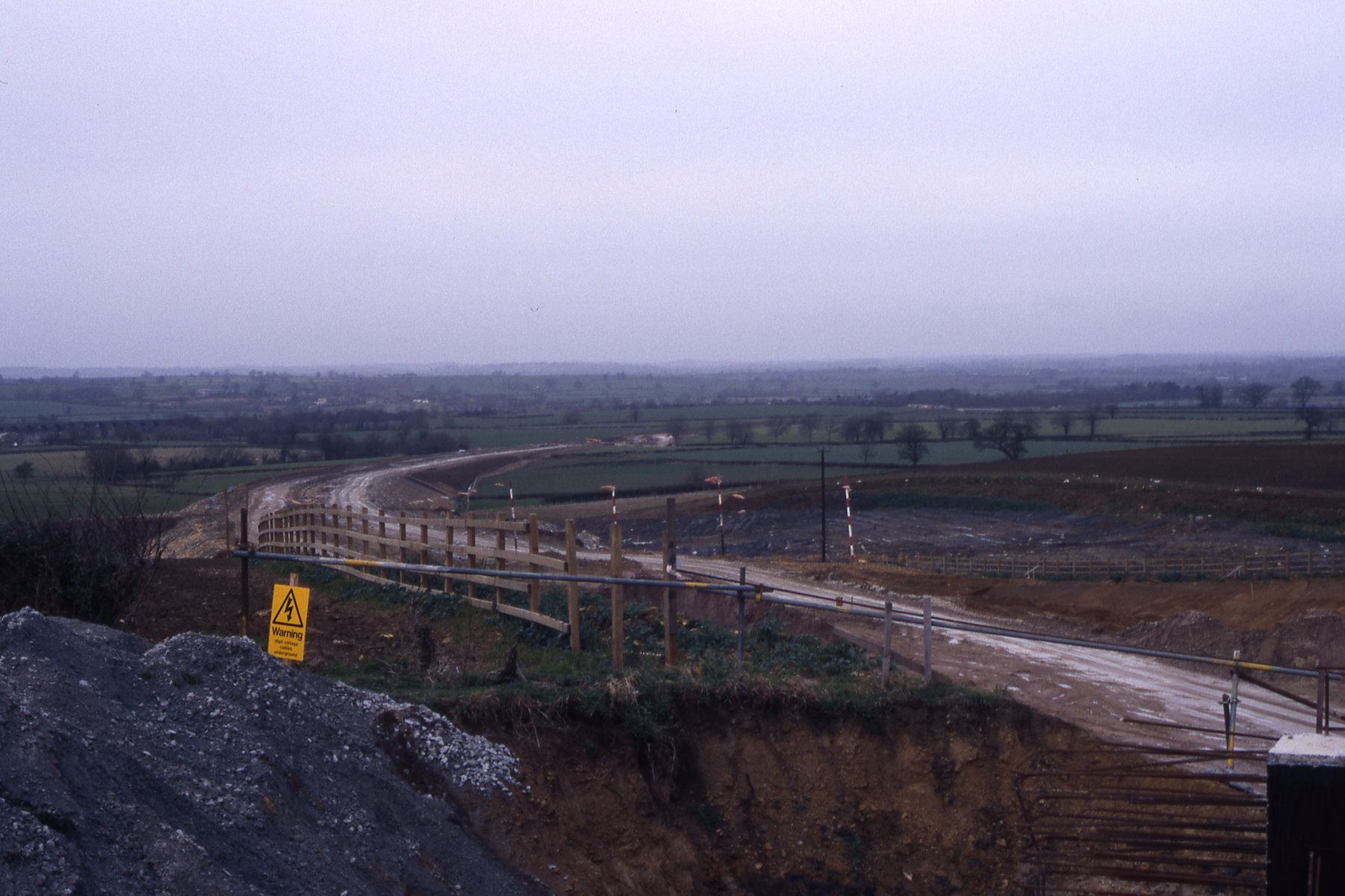
Construction in February 1989

At the time of being fully opened, the original M40 had been widened, creating a dual three-lane motorway from start to finish, with the exception of the Handy Cross underpass, which remains dual two-lane.

=== Further developments ===
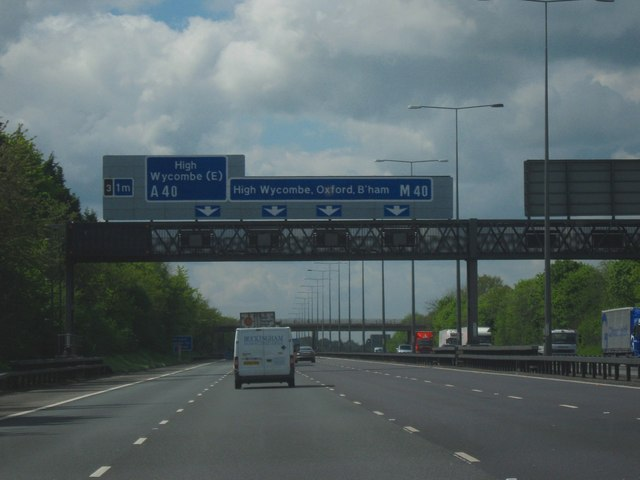
M40 junction 3 heading west

The M40 had been expected to be the last major motorway to be built in Britain, but in 1986 the Conservative government announced a major new road-building scheme, Roads for Prosperity, much of which was cancelled in 1996 after major road protests.

Beginning in 1997, the motorway was widened to dual-four-lane between J1A and J3 (High Wycombe East) under a Private Finance Initiative. It was completed by a Carillion-John Laing joint venture in October 1998 – the original plan included widening between J3 and J4. Oxford services and Warwick Services opened in 1998.

Work to separate local and long-distance traffic at J4 was completed in 2007, including a new dedicated left-turn slip lane between the A404 Marlow Bypass and the Oxford-bound M40; additional lanes on the slip roads entering the roundabout; an additional lane between the A404 Marlow Hill and the London-bound M40; and a five-lane cross-link between the M40 and the A404(S).

In 2009 the Highways Agency extended the Active Traffic Management (ATM) system onto the northbound carriageway from J16 to the junction with the M42. Beaconsfield services opened in 2009, near the site of the service station proposed at Abbey Barns almost 40 years earlier.

In August 2010 work started on J9, upgrading the southbound exit slip road to three lanes, and similar widening on the connecting A34 and A41 junctions between Oxford and Bicester. This was the first part of the work at this busy junction since it was built 20 years earlier. If the necessary funding becomes available, a second phase of improvement will be carried out, upgrading the northbound entrance and the A41 southbound entrance.

== Route ==
=== Main towns/cities served ===
The following table only includes places situated near the motorway and those close enough to be considered 'near the motorway' (like Aylesbury). Other places that may use the motorway (for access to the north) are not included as they have other motorway access (for example Slough). Small villages are not included. Population figures are based on the 2001 census by the Office for National Statistics

Settlements on M40 corridor
Place	Population	Ceremonial county	Main railway station	Motorway junction
Gerrards Cross/Chalfont St Peter	19,622	Buckinghamshire	Gerrards Cross	1,2
Beaconsfield	10,679	Buckinghamshire	Beaconsfield	2
High Wycombe Urban Area	118,229	Buckinghamshire	High Wycombe	3,4
Thame	10,886	Oxfordshire	Haddenham & Thame Parkway	7,8A
Oxford	134,248	Oxfordshire	Oxford	8,8A
Bicester	28,672	Oxfordshire	Bicester North	9
Aylesbury Urban Area	69,021	Buckinghamshire	Aylesbury	7,8A,9
Banbury	43,867	Oxfordshire	Banbury	11
Leamington Spa	45,114	Warwickshire	Leamington Spa	13,14,15
Warwick	25,434	Warwickshire	Warwick	15
Stratford-upon-Avon	23,676	Warwickshire	Stratford-upon-Avon	15

=== List of junctions ===
M40 motorway junctions
mile	km	Southbound exits (B carriageway)	Junction	Northbound exits (A carriageway)	Coordinates
18.1	29.2	End of motorway Road continues as A40 to London	J1	Start of motorway Road formed from main carriageways of A40 from London	51.5613°N 0.4959°W
18.1	29.2	Slough (A412); Uxbridge (A4020)	J1	Amersham, Denham A40; Slough (A412); Non-motorway traffic	51.5613°N 0.4959°W
19.9; 20.4	32.0; 32.9	M25; Watford, Stansted, (M1, (A1(M)), M11); Heathrow, (M4, M3, M23)	J1a; Partial cloverleaf interchange	M25; Heathrow, (M4, M3); Watford, Stansted (M1, A1(M), M11)	51.5608°N 0.5313°W
24.8; 25.3	39.9; 40.7	Beaconsfield, Amersham, Slough A355, Beaconsfield services Extra	J2; Services	Beaconsfield, Amersham, Slough A355, Beaconsfield services Extra	51.5943°N 0.6276°W
27.8; 28.1	44.7; 45.2	No Exit	J3	High Wycombe (E) A40	51.6034°N 0.6917°W
31.3; 31.6	50.3; 50.9	High Wycombe, Marlow, Maidenhead A404 (M4)	J4	High Wycombe, Marlow A404 (M4)	51.6123°N 0.7685°W
38.9; 39.3	62.6; 63.2	Stokenchurch, West Wycombe A40	J5	Stokenchurch A40	51.6605°N 0.9129°W
		Entering Buckinghamshire		Entering Oxfordshire	
41.4; 41.8	66.7; 67.2	Watlington, Princes Risborough B4009	J6	Watlington, Princes Risborough B4009	51.6722°N 0.9607°W
47.0; 47.4	75.6; 76.2	No Exit	J7	Thame, Wallingford, A329	51.7246°N 1.0575°W
48.0; 48.4	77.3; 77.9	No Exit	J8	Oxford, Cheltenham A40	51.7323°N 1.0768°W
49.0; 49.2	78.9; 79.2	Thame, Aylesbury A418; Oxford (A40); Oxford services Welcome Break	J8a; Services	Aylesbury A418; Oxford (A40); Oxford services Welcome Break	51.7401°N 1.0955°W
		Entering Oxfordshire		Entering Buckinghamshire	
		Entering Buckinghamshire		Entering Oxfordshire	
60.3; 60.6	97.1; 97.6	Bicester, Aylesbury A41; Oxford, Newbury A34	J9	Newbury, Oxford A34; Bicester A41	51.8688°N 1.1985°W
65.9; 66.2	106.0; 106.6	Northampton, Milton Keynes A43; Middleton Stoney B430, Cherwell Valley services Moto	J10; Services	Northampton A43; Middleton Stoney B430; Cherwell Valley services Moto	51.9496°N 1.2061°W
		Entering Oxfordshire		Entering Northamptonshire	
		Entering Northamptonshire		Entering Oxfordshire	
		Entering Oxfordshire		Entering Northamptonshire	
		Entering Northamptonshire		Entering Oxfordshire	
76.2; 76.7	122.7; 123.4	Banbury A422 (A361)	J11	Banbury A422 (A361)	52.0727°N 1.3133°W
		Entering Oxfordshire		Entering Warwickshire	
		Entering Warwickshire		Entering Oxfordshire	
		Entering Oxfordshire		Entering Warwickshire	
86.8; 87.0	139.7; 140.0	Gaydon B4451	J12	Gaydon B4451	52.1922°N 1.4581°W
89.8	144.5	Warwick Services Welcome Break	Services	Warwick Services Welcome Break	52.2181°N 1.5043°W
92.1; 92.3	148.2; 148.6	No Exit	J13	Leamington, Warwick A452 (A425)	52.2407°N 1.5536°W
93.9; 94.2	151.1; 151.6	Leamington A452	J14	No Exit	52.2569°N 1.5882°W
95.0; 95.3	152.9; 153.4	Warwick A429; Stratford, Coventry, Warwick Parkway A46	J15	Coventry, Stratford, Warwick Parkway A46; Warwick A429	52.2601°N 1.6134°W
103.8; 104.1	167.1; 167.6	Henley A3400	J16	No Exit	52.3351°N 1.7745°W
105.7; 106.0	170.1; 170.6	Start of motorway Motorway is formed by two sliproads from the M42	J17 (M42, J3a)	End of motorway M42; The NORTH (M1, M6), Birmingham (E, N & C), Solihull, N.E.C, Airport & International; The SOUTH WEST (M5), Birmingham (S & W), Redditch	52.3474°N 1.8191°W

Data from driver location signs are used to provide distance and carriageway identifier information. Where a junction spans several hundred metres, both start and end locations are given.

An Active Traffic Management system operates on the short section northbound from junction 16 (A3400) to the M42.

=== Services ===
The motorway has four service areas:

- Beaconsfield services (off J2), operated by Extra MSA accessible from the A355
- Oxford services (off J8A), operated by Welcome Break, accessible from J8 and the A418
- Cherwell Valley services (off J10, A43), operated by Moto.
- Warwick services (between J12 and J13), operated by Welcome Break, consisting of two sites mirroring each other without a connection.

A motorway service station was proposed at Abbey Barn to cost £700,000, south of High Wycombe in November 1973, north of Little Marlow, next to the former Wycombe Summit. A similar motorway service station was proposed at Hensall, North Yorkshire on the (unbuilt) M62 in December 1973, and which likewise was neither built.

=== Detailed route description ===
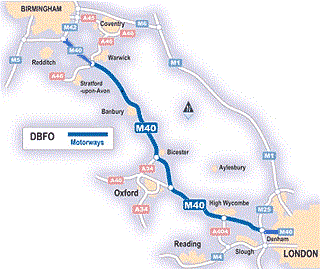
The path of the M40 corridor between London and Birmingham showing other important roads and major settlements.

Junction 1 of the M40 is at the Denham Roundabout near Uxbridge just east of the M25. The motorway is carried over the top of the roundabout, which interchanges with the A40, the A412, the A4020 and links to the A413 off the A40 westbound.

The motorway carries on for another 1/2 mile (0.80 km) before it reaches junction 1a, the free-flow interchange with the M25 London Orbital. It is a partially unrolled cloverleaf, with the smoothest turns from the London-bound M40 (from Oxfordshire, Warwickshire and the wider West Midlands) to the anti-clockwise M25 (London Heathrow, Gatwick, The Channel Ports) and vice versa, since this is the largest exchange of traffic between the two motorways. The M40 passes over the interchange, with the M25 on the bottom. The clockwise M25 enters the junction with four lanes with a lane drop to accommodate traffic heading for the M40 westbound, leaving the junction with three lanes. The anti-clockwise M25 enters the junction with three lanes and gains a lane from the London-bound M40 to accommodate the extra traffic. The London-bound M40 enters with four lanes, with a lane drop for the M25 exit, leaves with three lanes, and the westbound M40 enters with lanes and gains a lane from the anti-clockwise M25.

After junction 1a the motorway is four lanes, and carries on for 3 miles (4.8 km) until it reaches junction 2 for the A355 to Slough and the A40 to Beaconsfield and Gerrards Cross. Junction 2 is the standard roundabout interchange over the M40. Beaconsfield services are located at this junction.

Junction 3 is 3 miles (4.8 km) further on, and serves the A40 for High Wycombe East and Loudwater. This is a restricted junction; the only flows are from the westbound M40 to the A40 and from the A40 to the London-bound M40. The westbound carriageway loses a lane, remaining three lanes for the rest of the route, and the London-bound carriageway gains a lane. The motorway then immediately crosses the valley on a large ramp-like bridge.

Junction 4 is the interchange with the A404, for High Wycombe, Marlow, Maidenhead, Reading, Windsor and the M4. The motorway through the junction was not widened from the original two lanes when the rest of the motorway from junction 8 to London was, and so both carriageways experience a temporary lane drop. The junction used to be a straightforward roundabout interchange with exits for the M40 (west and east), High Wycombe (A404), the A4010, two local roads and the A404 dual carriageway to the south. During 2007, work was completed which included extra stacking space on the sliproads from the M40, provision for traffic from the A404 northbound to join the M40 westbound slip road without joining the roundabout and provision for the London-bound M40 to skip the section of the roundabout which serves the A4010, High Wycombe, and the A404 north.

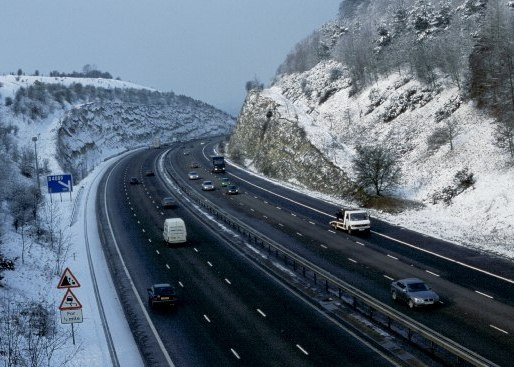
Stokenchurch Gap cutting through the Chiltern Hills

Junction 5 is for the A40 and Stokenchurch, a basic diamond interchange and the fourth junction of the M40 with the A40. Within a mile there is a large road cutting known as the Stokenchurch Gap or The Canyon where the motorway enters Oxfordshire and meets junction 6 with the B4009 for Lewknor, Watlington, and Chinnor. This junction is a variant on the diamond interchange, with the slip roads from the M40 having sharp bends.

Just over 1 mile (1.6 km) after junction 6 the motorway passes to within 330 feet (100 m) of St Giles Church, Tetsworth and 2 miles (3.2 km) farther on meets the first of three junctions in close succession. Junction 7 is a restricted junction with the A329 serving Thame and the A40. Access is limited allowing exit for only northbound traffic and entry only for southbound traffic. The exiting slip road on the southbound M40 at junction 7 is for "Works Traffic Only" to a depot. A slip road allows traffic from the A329 to join the M40 north but is closed to motorway traffic by a gate, so traffic must continue for 2 miles (3.2 km)to junction 8.

At junction 8, a spur off the M40, with two-lane carriageways, leaves the mainline of the motorway as far as a trumpet junction for Wheatley and the A418, then continuing as the A40 towards Oxford. The spur can be accessed via the M40 northbound or by leaving the M40 at junction 8a southbound and crossing the M40 via the A418, and traffic heading towards the M40 can only join the southbound carriageway. Traffic going in the other direction has to use the trumpet junction, and follow the A418 past Oxford services. The M40 heads north from junction 8A. This was the temporary end of the M40 before the northern section was open. Visible either side of the junction are the embankments and remains of the overbridge which carried the Wycombe railway line.

The motorway continues for 12 miles (19 km) to junction 9 for the A34 (E05) and the A41. The A34 dual carriageway serves Oxford and is a trunk route for Newbury, Winchester and Southampton (via the M3) as well as the rest of the South Coast — for this the reason it is part of the unsigned European route E05. The A41 dual carriageway serves Bicester and Aylesbury, and both roads meet the motorway at Wendelbury roundabout junction. Its design is inefficient and cannot cope with a very large volume of traffic using the junction. To try to alleviate this problem, there is a temporary lane drop for the London-bound carriageway. The largest exchange of traffic is between the A34 and the M40 north, and traffic on those roads backs up and causes congestion on both roads (going north and south), as well as on the interchange itself. North of the junction, the existing A34 becomes the A3400. This means the A34 is now technically in two halves (it regains status farther up the road at junction 16, although signs on the motorway do not mention this). Instead, the first signs for the A34 from a motorway are on the M42 at junction 4, as with the A41. The road also becomes part of the E05 north of junction 9.

The M40 follows a course of almost due north for 5 miles (8.0 km) before reaching junction 10, for the Cherwell Valley services, the A43 and the village of Ardley. The A43 terminates at junction 10, although originally it carried on to Kidlington, the southern part of the old route now used by the re-routed A34. (The original A43 towards Oxford is now the B430.) The A43 serves Brackley, Silverstone and its racing circuit, home to the British Grand Prix. Farther on, the A43 leads to Northampton and the M1. Junction 10 was originally a dumbbell junction. The capacity of both the junction and the single carriageway A43 proved too small when the road was used as a freight thoroughfare from the congested M1 to the M40 to London, and the A34 at junction 9 to the south coast — in fact the 5 miles (8.0 km) stretch between these junctions is the busiest on the motorway in both directions. When the A43 (between the M1 and M40) was upgraded to dual carriageway, the junction was redesigned and rebuilt by the Highways Agency to cope with the extra traffic. A third roundabout was added to the junction, to the north, with the slips for the southbound M40 and the A43, with the slip roads for the northbound M40 remodelled as well, and the roundabout in the middle now serving the services.

The slip road for the London-bound carriageway which used to be accessed from the roundabout is now reached only via the services. The design and execution of the revised design of new junction is greatly derided, mostly because of the three roundabouts giving no priority to the main flow of traffic, (A43-M40 London), and the slip roads off and onto the motorway (except the one accessed via the services) have sharp turns and adverse cambers, which results in lorries frequently tipping over and spilling their loads especially on the roundabout at the end of the northern carriageway. The junction fails to perform its function as an effective traffic junction. As well, the slip roads onto the motorway give little manoeuvring space as both join the motorway under (the same) bridge built for the old junction.

The motorway then follows a winding route north for 10 miles (16 km) until junction 11, the A422 and A361, serving Banbury. The motorway does not follow the straight route to the east of Middleton Cheney, meeting with the A422, as it had once been planned, due to a major landowner refusing his land to be cut in two. If built as planned, junction 11 would be east of Middleton Cheney, meeting with the A422, and probably would have fuelled major growth in the village as well as Banbury, the primary destination of the junction. As it is, the junction was built 1.5 miles (2.4 km) west along the A422, with the motorway skirting Banbury. The junction itself is a regular roundabout interchange, and has the single carriageway A361 from Daventry the dual-carriageway A422 from Brackley and the A43 from the west, and the dual-carriageway A422 (A361) toward Banbury feeding to/from it.

Another 12 miles (19 km) north-west along the motorway is junction 12, serving Gaydon and the Heritage Motor Centre via the B4451. The junction is a box-standard diamond interchange. Farther along the motorway is Warwick Services, the last on the motorway, before it reaches the restricted access junction 13. This serves Leamington Spa and Warwick via the A452, and Gaydon via the B4100. The junction is incomplete as a half-diamond interchange, with access only from the northbound carriageway and access to the southbound M40.

The junction is completed 2 miles (3.2 km) farther on at junction 14, another restricted access junction, with access to the A452 from the southbound M40, and the access on to the motorway is in a northbound direction. The slip roads join at a roundabout and carry on as the single carriageway A452 to meet with the A452 to Leamington Spa, A425 to Warwick, and the A452 to J13. A few hundred yards further up is junction 15, known as Longbridge island. This is a large, regular roundabout interchange, and is always busy during peak times due to the various destinations it serves, including The Cotswolds, Stratford-upon-Avon, Coventry, and Warwick. Farther north, Henley-in-Arden (J16) is again 'incomplete' to discourage local traffic.

The motorway joins the M42 in both directions, with northbound traffic taking the left lane to exit eastbound, eventually forming the outer lanes of the M42 via a tight-bending two lane connecting road, and the right lanes being taken eastbound. Similarly, southbound, eastbound traffic from the M42 splits off from the outer two lanes, whereas westbound traffic of the M42 has a single lane, widening to a two lane slip road, which merges with the middle lane and forms the outer lane of the southbound M40.

== Incidents and accidents ==
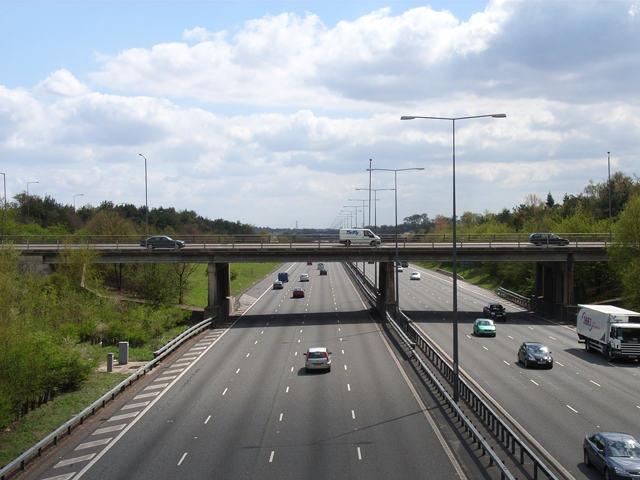
M40 at Burtley Wood, Buckinghamshire

- 18 November 1993, 12 school children and a teacher died when their minibus crashed into a parked motorway maintenance vehicle just after midnight. The inquest recorded a verdict of accidental death for all of the victims but noted that none of the children were wearing seatbelts and that the side-facing bench seating was dangerous. Seatbelts were subsequently made compulsory for passengers on coaches and minibuses in September 2006.
- 28 March 2002, more than 100 vehicles were involved in a pile-up near High Wycombe that resulted in two deaths.
- 2 August 2002, four people were killed between J11 and J12, about 3 miles south of Warwick services, when a northbound lorry crossed the central reservation and into oncoming southbound traffic. The resulting fire caused the Southbound carriage to be closed for several hours and required resurfacing.
- 9 August 2003, Jimmy Davis, a 21-year-old Watford footballer on loan from Manchester United, died on the M40 in Oxfordshire in the early hours after his BMW collided with a lorry. He was two-times over the drink-drive limit and had been driving at up to 120 mph (190 km/h).
- 12 August 2007, a motorcyclist was shot dead between J13 and J12. The victim was a member of the Hells Angels on his way home from the Bulldog Bash. In October 2008, a man pleaded guilty to murder ahead of the trial of six other men on charges of murder and firearms offences.
- 18 July 2012, a driver in her seventies died in a vehicle fire. She had broken down in the middle lane and a car collided with the back of her vehicle.
- 12 July 2025. Four people ran off after a motorway collision that killed a 27-year-old man, police said. The incident took place on the northbound carriageway of the M40 in Buckinghamshire, and led to a closure between junction 1a for the M25 (Denham Interchange) and junction two for Beaconsfield.

== See also ==
- List of motorways in the United Kingdom
- M40 corridor
- History of Banbury, Oxfordshire
