= Extra (service areas) =

British company operating service stations

Extra MSA
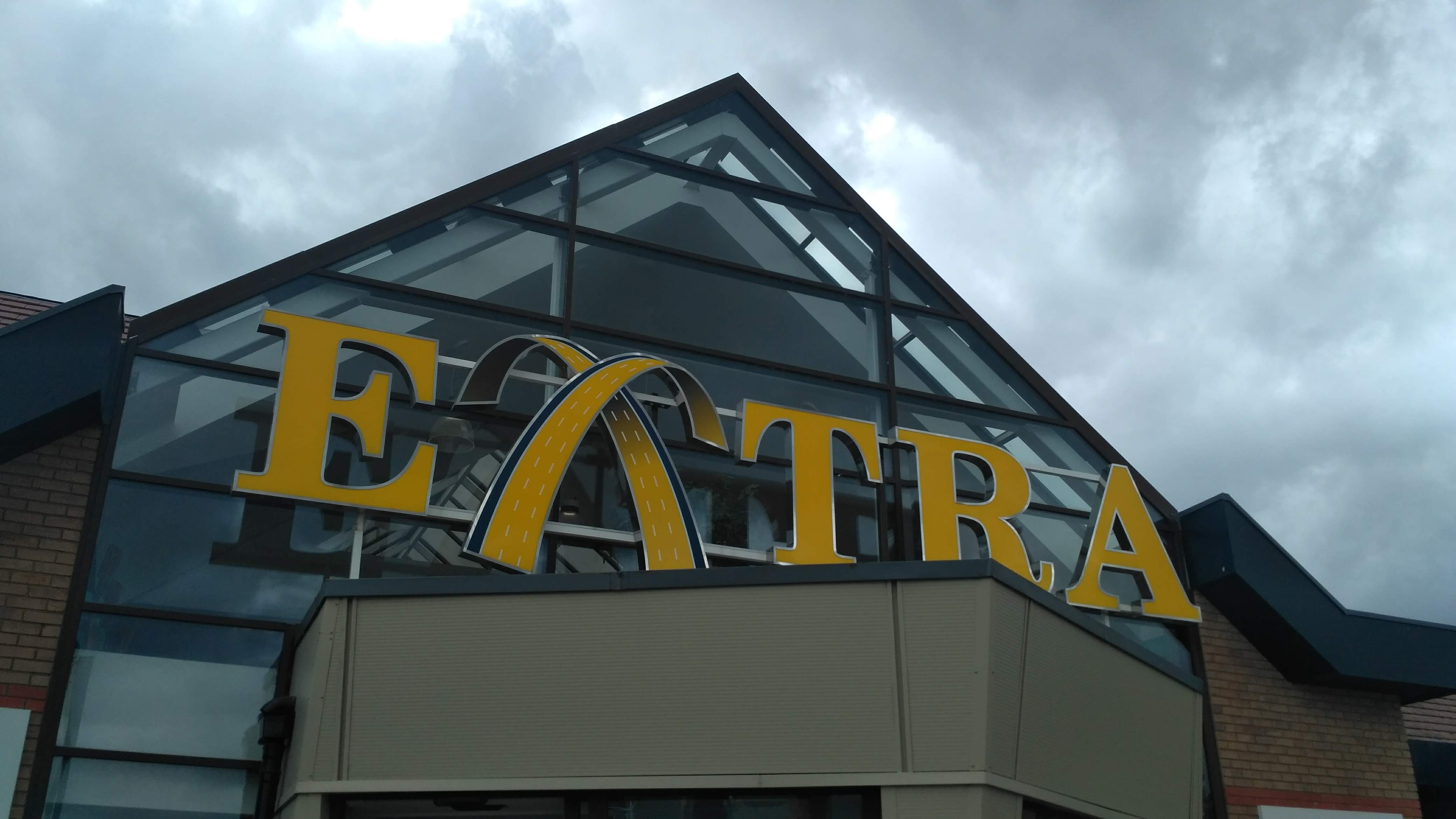
- The logo at the Cambridge services
- Type: Private
- Industry: Hospitality
- Headquarters: Beaconsfield, England, UK
- Area served: England
- Website: www.extraservices.co.uk

Extra MSA, often referred to as Extra is a company that operates multiple motorway service stations across England, mainly on primary routes. It is based at Beaconsfield services, previously being in the centre of Lincoln. It is legally registered as Extra MSA Property UK Ltd.

Many of the brands at Extra locations including M&S Simply Food, Costa Coffee and Greggs are operated by Moto, the UK's largest service area operator and Extra's biggest competitor.

== Market position ==
Extra is the fourth largest service station operator in the UK (by number of locations) behind Moto, Welcome Break and RoadChef. It came into operation after the government deregulated motorway services to encourage more competition and its first site opened in December 2000, at Cambridge.

== Outlets ==
=== Service stations ===
Extra motorway service areas

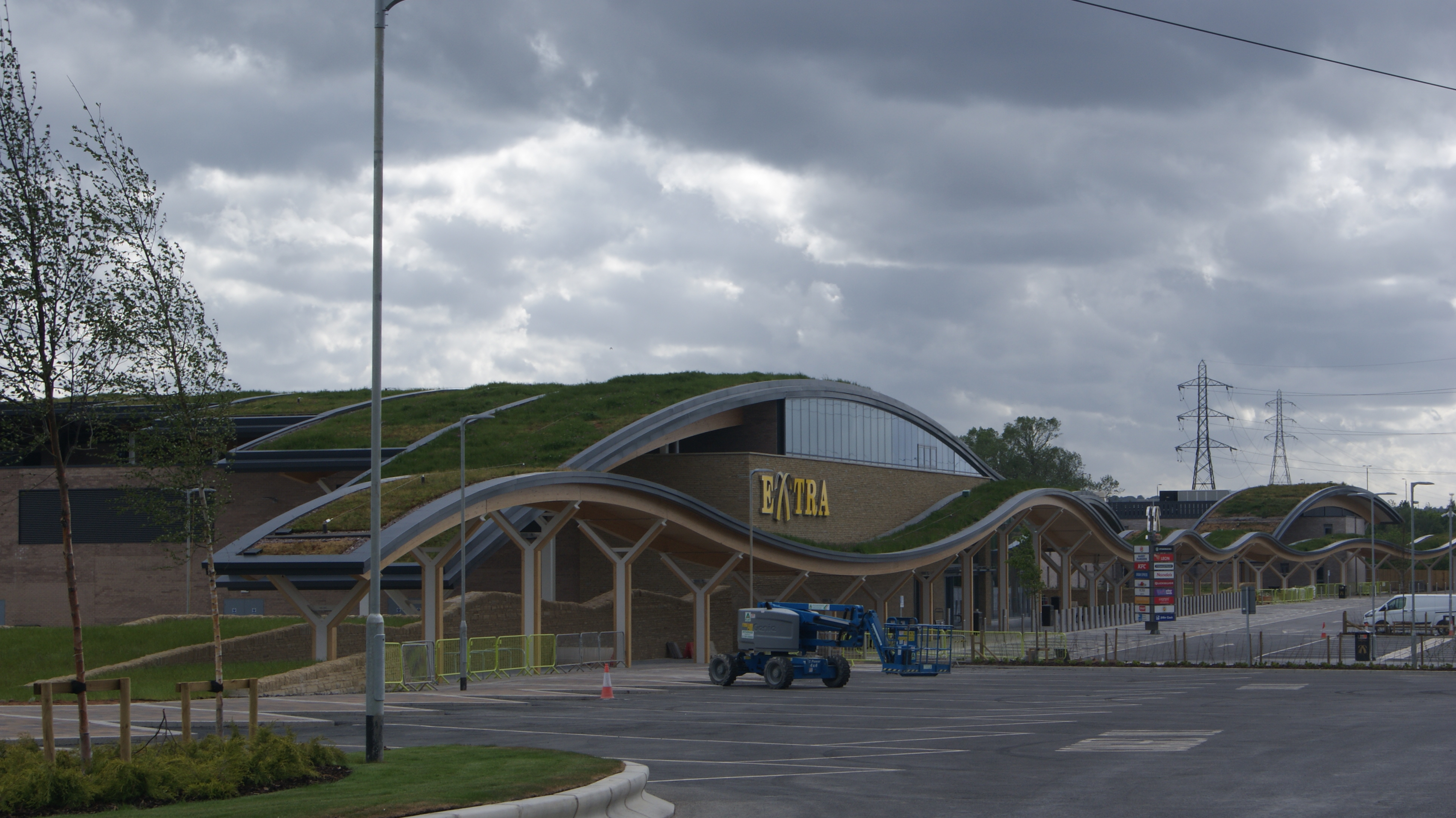
Leeds Skelton Lake Services

Extra developed its first three service stations at a cost of £60 million. The parent company was set up in 1992 by Stephen Spouge, who is now chairman. Its service stations are designed by Nash and Partners of West Sussex.

As of April 2026, Extra operates eight service areas:

- Baldock - A1/A1(M) J10, via A507
- Beaconsfield - M40 J2, via A355
- Blackburn with Darwen - M65, J4
- Cambridge - A14, J24
- Cullompton - M5, J28
- Peterborough - A1/A1(M) J17, via A605
- Cobham - M25 between J9 & J10
- Leeds Skelton Lake - M1, J45

=== Expansion (2020-) ===
Extra rapidly expanded its portfolio in the early 2020s with the addition of Leeds Skelton Lake (M1, J45) in 2020, proposals for Solihull Motorway Services (M42, J5) gaining planning permission in 2025 and the development of Warrington Services (M61, J11) starting in 2026.

A motorway service area on the M25 at J16/17 was proposed in early 2019, and recommended for refusal in 2023; however, this was not formally recorded on the planning portal and in 2025 Extra revived plans to build the service station.

Another plan for a motorway service area on the M1 at J25 was withdrawn by Extra in 2020, following significant campaigning from local environmental groups.

== Facilities ==
Extra service stations offer a large variety of facilities including fast casual food options such as Burger King and McDonald's, alongside more traditional restaurants including JD Wetherspoon and Nando's and coffee chains including Costa and Starbucks.

Also available are retail outlets including WHSmith, M&S Simply Food and a number of hotel chains including Travelodge and Days Inn.

== See also ==
- Rest area
- Moto
- Welcome Break
- RoadChef
