= Motorway service area =

Rest areas in the UK and Ireland

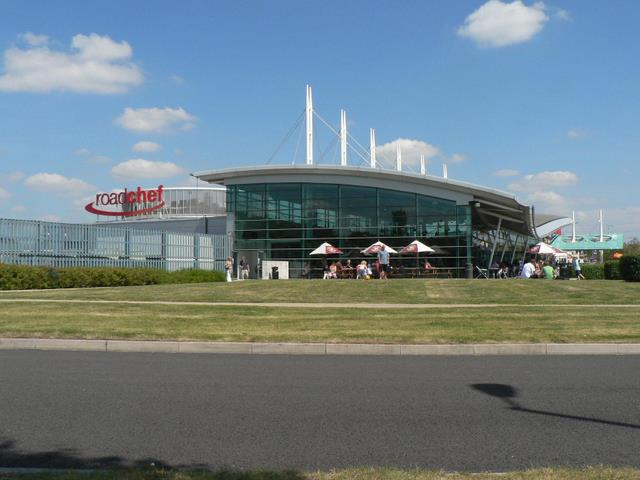
Norton Canes services on the M6 Toll motorway, operated by Roadchef

Motorway service areas (MSA), also known as services or service stations, are rest areas in Great Britain and Ireland where drivers can leave a motorway to refuel/recharge, rest, eat and drink, shop, use the toilet or stay in an on-site overnight hotel. They are also a safe refuge for drivers who break down alongside leaving at a motorway junction. The majority of motorway services in the United Kingdom are owned by one of three companies: Moto, Welcome Break and Roadchef. Smaller operators include Extra, Westmorland and EG Group.

== History ==
=== United Kingdom ===
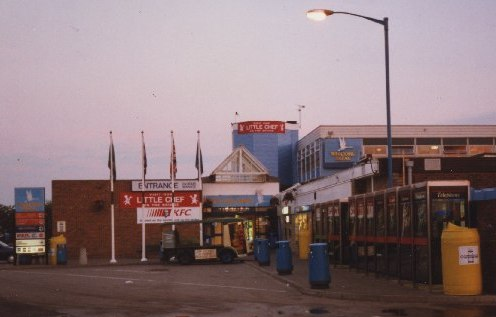
Keele services on the M6 run by Welcome Break in 1996

Examples of UK
traffic signs for
motorway services

The first two service areas in the UK, Watford Gap and Newport Pagnell, opened with temporary facilities when the M1 motorway was opened, on 2 November 1959.

Initially, most service areas were designed to be bold and attractive, with many opening viewing platforms and featuring fancy restaurants. A famous example of a service area from this era is Lancaster, which features a 65ft tower which previously contained the main restaurant. However, it became apparent in the late 1960s that such fancy amenities were unprofitable, so service areas began offering an increasingly basic service. High street brands were introduced to service areas in the 1990s, with most facilities eventually becoming franchises of well known brands.

As more service stations opened, the number of operating companies increased, with sites run by the Rank Organisation, Granada, Pavilion, Take a Break and Esso, among others. Through acquisitions and mergers, there are now only three major operators. In an attempt to break this oligopoly, in 2001, the government proposed allowing "mobile fast food vans" to operate at the areas, though this idea never came to fruition.

Originally, service areas were government-owned and leased to the operating companies. From 1992 onwards, new sites were planned and owned by private operators, and existing sites sold to them.

In 2007, an AA survey concluded that service areas had improved in the previous three years, but cleanliness and pricing were still major issues.

Opposition towards service areas has grown, with some planning applications being refused: some notable examples are Catherine-de-Barnes on the M42, and Kirby Hill on the A1(M), both of which have had applications contested. Despite concerns of local residents, Beaconsfield on the M40 opened on 17 March 2009, and Cobham services opened in September 2012. Kirby Hill would eventually get approved for construction in April 2021, with Catherine-de-Barnes being granted planning permission in March 2022.

In 2017, Transport Focus began an annual review of service areas, with each site ranked on a league table. Reviews have taken place every year since. The latest UK motorway service area to open is Sawtry services, operated by Moto Hospitality, which opened on 31 March 2025.

=== Republic of Ireland ===
The Republic of Ireland has six official motorway service areas, but 16 in total. The first service area, Lusk services, opened on the M1 on 8 September 2010.

For many years, the National Roads Authority (NRA) opposed building services, preferring traffic to use existing businesses in bypassed towns, and that the motorway network was not large enough to support them. However, in 2006 the Roads Act 2007 made provision for a Motorway Service Area Scheme to allow the construction of services. The NRA held a competition to determine an operator for the first three service areas to be opened. SuperStop, a consortium consisting of Petrogas (Applegreen) and Tedcastles Oil Products (TOP), won the contract. These first services were Lusk (M1), Castlebellingham (M1) and Enfield (M4) and were all opened in late 2010.

Motorway services began to be developed privately from 2011, following delays from the NRA due to the economic recession. The first of these private sites was Cashel services on the M8, which was built by Topaz and opened on 9 June 2011.

The NRA awarded the second batch of three services (Gorey, Athlone and Kilcullen) to Topaz in 2014. SuperStop objected to the decision - resulting in the construction and opening of the three services being delayed. All three sites would eventually be opened in 2019, despite Gorey being constructed as far back as 2015. The sites would also open under Circle K instead after Topaz had been rebranded under the banner in 2018.

The newest motorway service area in the Republic of Ireland is the Portlaoise Plaza, which opened on 31 July 2020. The third wave of services is currently under review by Transport Infrastructure Ireland (successor to the NRA).

== Operators ==
=== UK operators ===
- Applegreen UK
- EG Group
- Extra
- Stop24
- Moto Hospitality
- Roadchef
- Welcome Break
- Westmorland

=== ROI operators ===
- Applegreen/SuperStop
- Circle K (formerly Topaz)
- Plaza Group

== Locations ==
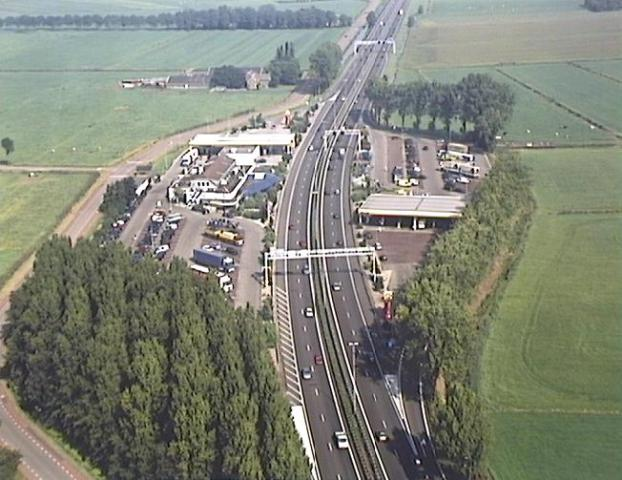
De Lucht Rest Area on the Dutch A2 motorway featuring an on-line site layout

Current government policy is that the interval between core motorway service areas should be no more than 28 miles (45 km) or 30 minutes travelling time, whichever is the lesser. A previous minimum separation of 12 miles was removed in 2013. The current 28 miles is derived from 30 minutes driving time for an HGV limited to 56 mph (90 km/h) and replaced the previous 30 miles (48 km) in 2008.

Initially service areas were located between junctions (on-line sites), having their own entry and exit slip roads. On-line sites usually have a separate site for each direction of travel, however Cobham services has a single site, accessed directly from the clockwise carriageway and via a tunnel from the anticlockwise carriageway of the M25. In some cases a pair of on-line sites for opposite directions may be connected via a pedestrian footbridge.

In 1992, the system was changed so that the developer became responsible for choosing the site of a motorway service area, and consequently junction sites became the preferred option as they are cheaper to construct, as well as being accessible to traffic travelling in several directions. Following a public consultation in 2007/8, the Department for Transport/Highways Agency announced that new services should be located at on-line sites, unless a junction site is the only possibility.

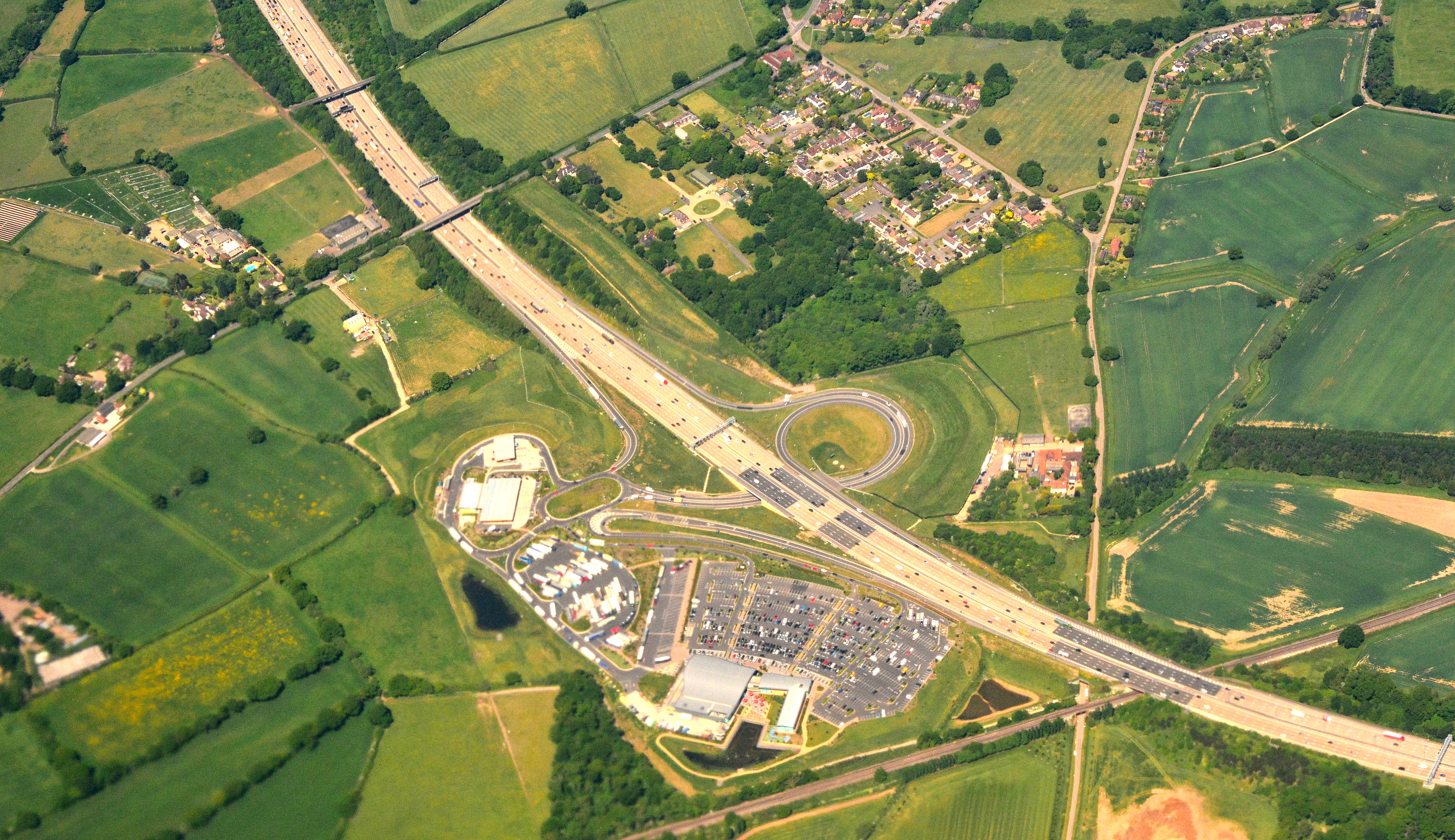
Cobham services on the M25 in Surrey

Two recent openings, Wetherby (2008) and Beaconsfield (2009), are examples of junction sites: they are located at A1(M) junction 46, and M40 junction 2 respectively. However, more recently still, Cobham (2012) and Gloucester (2014) are on-line.

The siting of motorway service areas can be contentious, leading to protracted public inquiries, and often vociferous local campaigns against proposed schemes.

== Facilities and requirements ==
Government policy for motorway services has been set out in a succession of Department for Transport Circulars, the current version being issued in December 2022. This sets out various facilities that must be provided in a new service station. Existing services that do not comply, because the requirements have changed, must achieve compliance as part of any significant refurbishment. These are enforced on operators either by the terms of their lease or by the need for the Highways Agency to agree to provide access to the motorway, and planning permission should be granted only for facilities that comply. The requirements include 24-hour, 365-day provision of:

- Free parking for a minimum of 2 hours. Separate parking must be provided for motorcycles, cars, caravans (drive-through so as not to require reversing), coaches, HGVs, abnormal loads, and disabled parking. In each case the minimum number of spaces is set by a formula based on traffic flow.
- Fuel.
- Free toilets and hand-washing facilities with no obligation to make a purchase. The minimum number of toilets is specified by a similar formula to that for parking. Shower and toilet facilities are also required within the HGV parking area.
- Baby-changing and breastfeeding facilities.
- Free play area for children.
- Hot drinks and hot food. Until 2013, the requirement was only for 24-hour snacks and hot drinks, plus hot substantial food from 6 am to 10 pm.

A picnic area with a minimum of ten tables each seating six people was required up to 2013, and is still required in order for a picnic area to be advertised on signage.

The following restrictions also apply:

- All traffic signing must comply with the Traffic Signs Regulations and General Directions that specify traffic signs for the rest of the road network.
- Rear access, from the local road network, is either not provided at all, or is restricted to staff and deliveries and is physically segregated from the main service area.

Lodges for accommodation are permitted. Conference facilities or business centres and retail space are permitted; the size of each of these was limited, basically to 200 and 500 m^{2} (2,200 and 5,400 sq ft) respectively, until 2013, but are now left to the planning system.

Originally, service areas were allowed to sell alcohol with food. Sale of alcohol was outlawed for service areas on government-owned land from 1961, though was permitted from 1998. The sale of alcohol was banned for new sites from 2008, but this ban was lifted in 2013.

The government policy distinguishes "service areas" and "rest areas". There are three rest areas (Todhills, Leeming Bar, and Scotch Corner). All were existing facilities on trunk roads that were upgraded to motorways, and now, in fact, meet the requirements for service areas. There is a further category of truck stop, serving HGVs only.

== See also ==
- Extra (service areas)
- List of motorway service areas in the United Kingdom
- Moto Hospitality
- Rest area
- Roadside station (Michi no eki), equivalent to motorway service areas in Japan
- RoadChef
- Welcome Break
