= Graffiti in Houston =

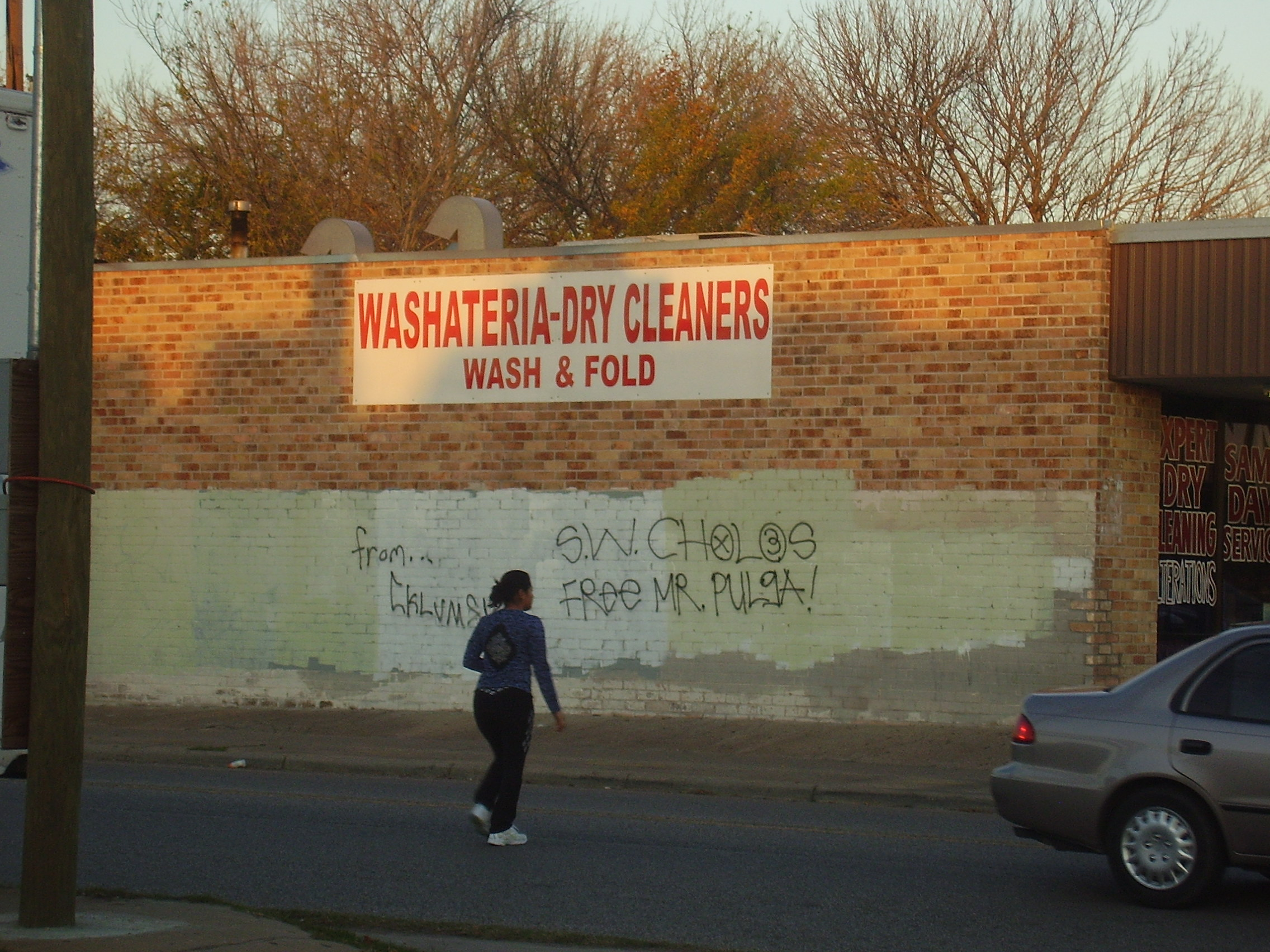
Graffiti in Houston

Graffiti is a cause of disagreement among residents of Houston, in the U.S. state of Texas. The city has as large graffiti community, according to the Houston Chronicle.

== Events and instances ==
One of Houston's first graffiti and street art show "Bombs, Burners, Scribbles and Tags" was held at REF Studios in Montrose in 1993. Johnathan Estes' graffiti art showcase was the largest in Greater Houston and among the largest in the nation.

The outdoor gallery Graffiti Park and its Houston Graffiti Building are popular sites for photography. One mural at the park by artist GONZO247(Mario Figueroa) has the text "I Heart Houston" and images of French fries and other fast food. The park is features many murals created by the city's graffiti scene.

The Houston Museum of Natural Science's annual "Trains Over Texas" display has paid tribute to the city's graffiti artists.

A replica of a NASA space shuttle at Space Center Houston was vandalized with graffiti in 2013. Students added pro-Trump graffiti on the campus of Rice University in 2017. The city has seen "yarn graffiti" and works inspired by the COVID-19 pandemic. Houston has also seen a series of "Rowdy" tags.

GONZO247 painted the "Houston Is Inspired" mural, among many others, and started the HUE Mural Festival in 2015. He also announced the creation of the Graffiti and Street Art Museum of Texas.

== Removal efforts ==
Not all of the graffiti has been artistic. In July of 2009, following a report of vandalism in the women's quarters of the Intercontinental Airport Fire Station 54, racist graffiti was left on their door.

The Houston Police Department is responsible for graffiti removal within city limits. Metro removes graffiti when cleaning bus stops. The Greater East End Management District started an abatement program in 2001.

== See also ==
- Be Someone (graffiti)
