= Cobham services =

M25 motorway services in Surrey, UK

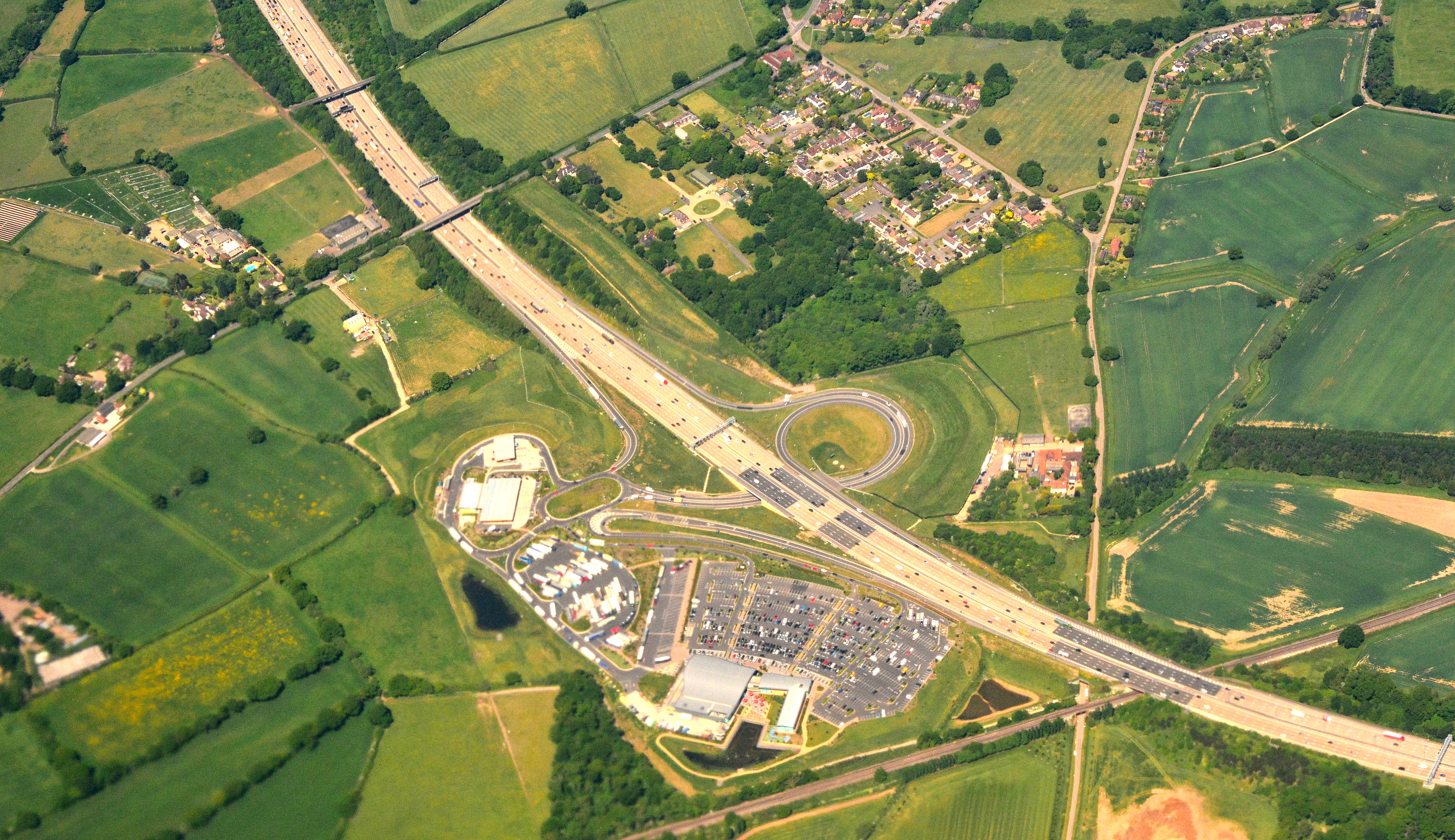
- Aerial photograph of Cobham Services, 2015

- Location within Surrey

Information
- County: Surrey
- Road: M25
- Coordinates: 51.3057°N 0.4093°W
- Operator: Extra MSA
- Date opened: 2012
- Website: extraservices.co.uk/locations/cobham-services-m25-j9-j10/

Cobham services is a motorway service area on the M25 motorway in Surrey between junctions 9 and 10. It is operated by Extra and was opened for business on 13 September 2012. Its planned opening date was scheduled to be early 2010, but was changed to early 2012 following various planning issues. The services were constructed as there was concern with the large 65 mile (104 km) gap without any service areas. At either end of that stretch of motorway was South Mimms services and Clacket Lane services, and the Secretary of State explained there was a clear and compelling need for a further service area. The other service area serving the motorway is Thurrock.

In 2018, Cobham services was the busiest service station in the UK.

== Planning ==
Proposals for a service station on the M25 at Cobham were first made in the early 1990s and the first public inquiry took place in 1996. Planning permission was granted in 2005. The service area is built on the site of a farm named 'New Barn Farm', and opened in September 2012.

Local politicians and residents expressed concerns that the service's construction was that the area was to be built on part of the green belt area for Cobham, However, as the whole of the M25 is situated within the green belt, the Secretary of State John Prescott overruled this objection as there was what he called a "clear and compelling need" to have a service station in the south west section of the M25.

Local councillors and residents also expressed doubts as to whether Downside's Victorian sewage system could deal with the waste from thousands of visiting tourists could damage

== Layout ==
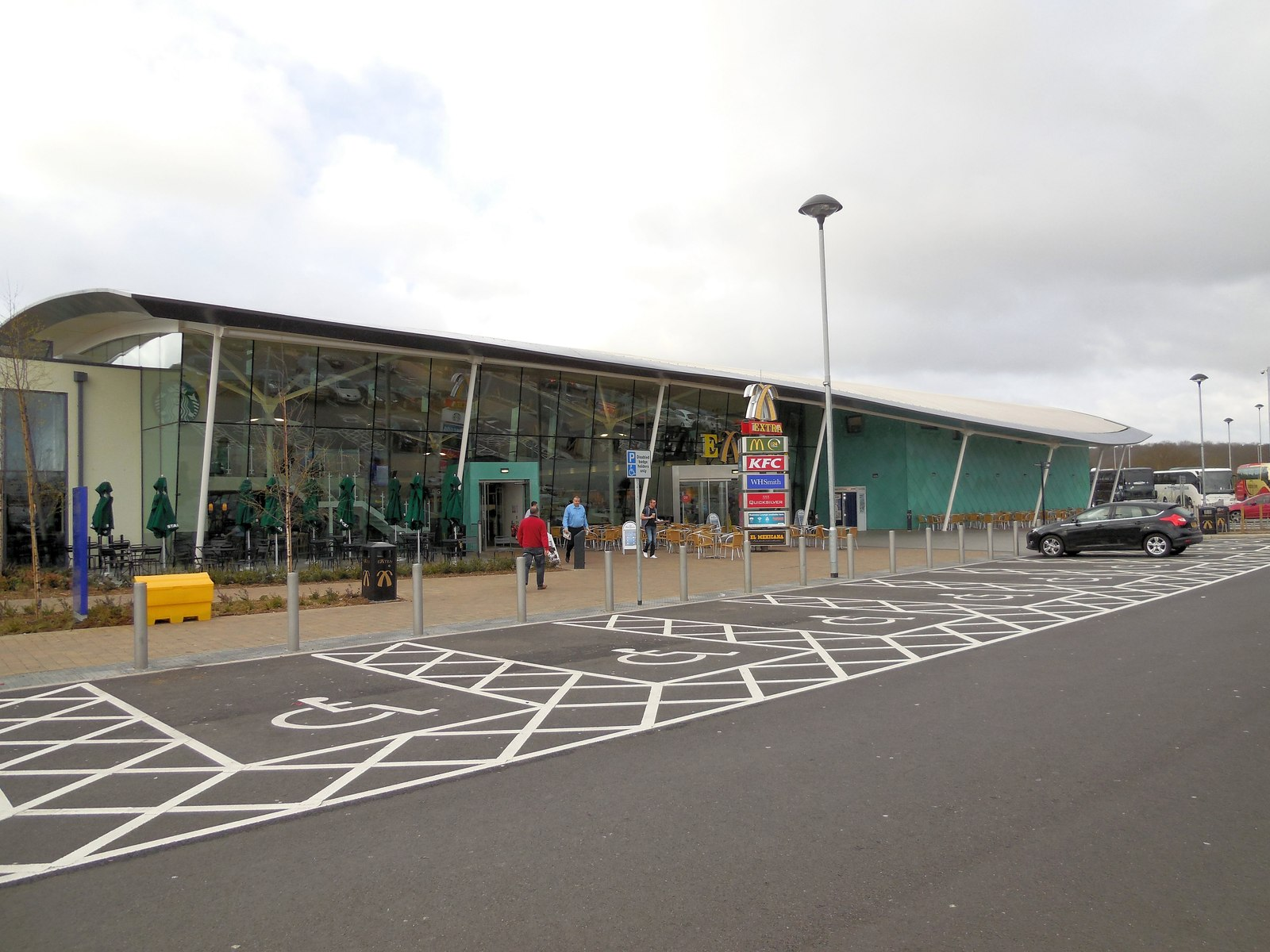
Main building in 2013

Unusually, one service area is provided for both traffic directions, located to the south of the motorway. Access from the eastbound carriageway is via a bridge underneath the M25. Access from the westbound carriageway is from the motorway itself.

== Construction ==
Work on the site started in Autumn 2010 and construction eventually started in mid-2011 on the slip roads and tunnel for the service area. The speed limit was reduced to 50 mph, and a temporary carriageway was set up, diverting traffic past the construction site and back onto the motorway. The 50 mph speed limit took place on a short section of the westbound carriageway, where construction traffic was accessing the site. The service area was built by Swayfields, a company founded by Extra, despite them entering administration in early 2010.

On 10 August 2012 an opening date of 8 September 2012 was announced, later than expected due to poor weather delaying the final phases of construction. Further delays caused the opening to slip to 13 September 2012.

Next anticlockwise: Clacket Lane services	Motorway service stations on the M25 motorway	Next clockwise: South Mimms services
