= Clacket Lane services =

M25 motorway services in Surrey, UK

Clacket Lane Services
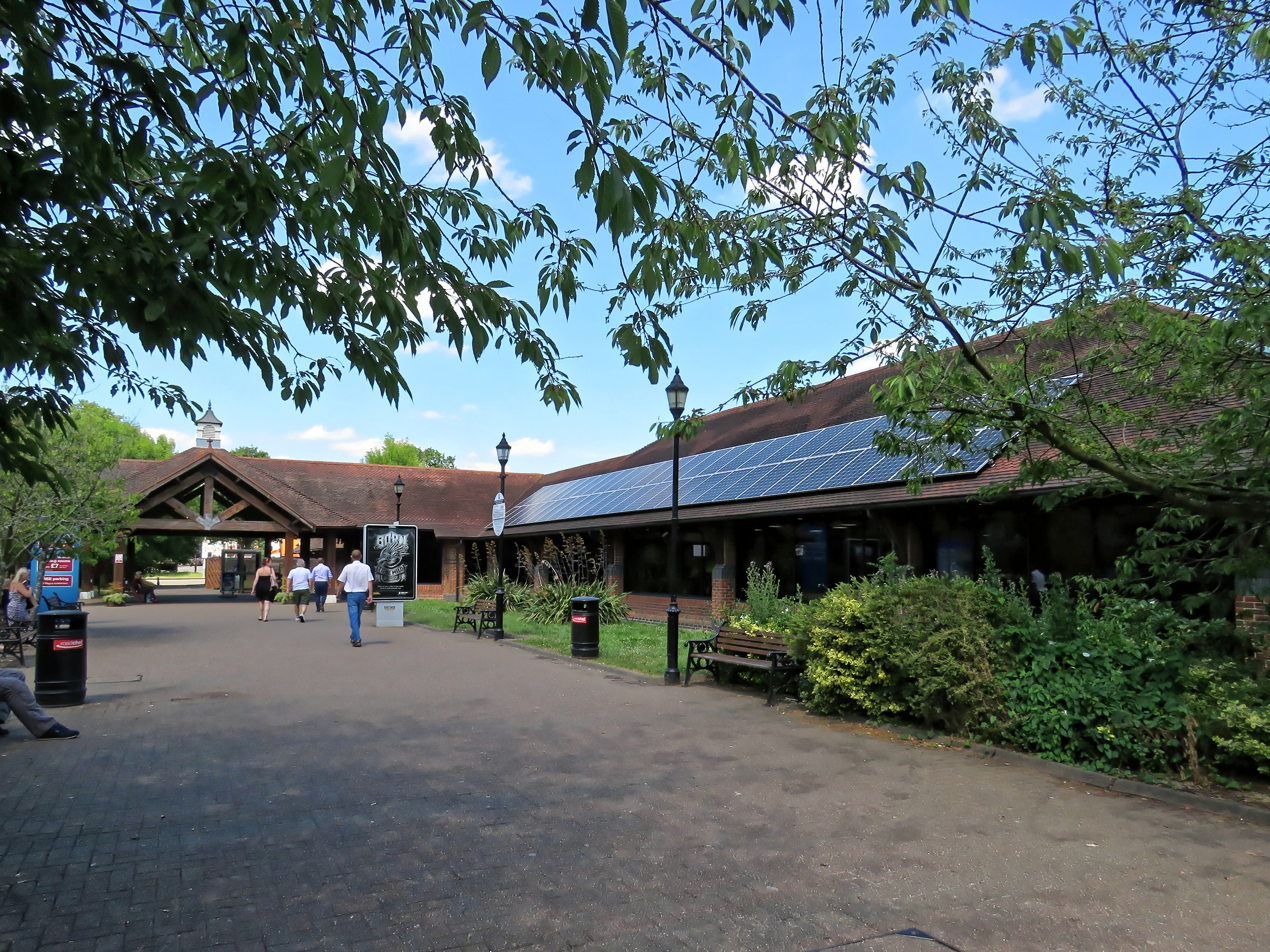
- The westbound service area

- Location within Surrey

Information
- County: Surrey
- Road: M25
- Coordinates: 51°16′16″N 0°02′20″E
- Operator: RoadChef
- Date opened: 17 May 1993
- Website: www.roadchef.com/locations/clacket-lane-eastbound

Clacket Lane services is a motorway service station on the M25 motorway midway between junctions 5 and 6, in Surrey, United Kingdom, adjacent to the parish borders between Limpsfield, Surrey and Westerham, Kent, a small village and a town respectively.

It is the largest Roadchef services in the UK, and one of the largest and busiest on the UK motorway network serving traffic on the extremely busy southern stretch of the M25 London orbital motorway, and traffic to and from the coastal ports and the Channel Tunnel. It is named after a road which passes over the motorway nearby.

== History ==
Service stations at the site were first proposed in 1972. During planning, the services were intended to be named Titsey Wood after the forest that surrounds the site. In 1977 Tandridge District Council received hundreds of protests about the proposed site being built in the wood.

The site would be 40 acres, with parking for 770 cars, 30 coaches and 150 trucks. There would be two self service restaurants with 400 seats each. It was anticipated to sell 12 million gallons of fuel in 1994. The site could store 1.6 million litres of fuel, with 160 pumps.

=== Construction ===
The architects were Dancey and Meredith. Structural engineering was by the Ernest Green Partnership. The £13.2m contract was awarded to Moss Construction of Cheltenham, who built it in 15 months, and by Wallis Ltd of Bromley. The landscape architect was Travers Morgan. Building started in May 1992. 45 year old Peter Whitlock, a former Asda store manager, from Milton Keynes, would be the general manager.

During construction of the sites, artefacts from Roman Britain were found, specifically from a disused Roman road and are now displayed at the service station.

=== Opening ===
Fuel services were opened on Monday 17 May 1993, by Patricia Banks, chairman of Tandridge District Council.

The catering services were opened by Robert Key, Minister for Roads and Traffic on 21 July 1993.

== Structure ==
Most of the site is in Tatsfield, and part of the western site is in Titsey. Staff entrances to the services are on Clacket Lane itself

Next anticlockwise: Thurrock services	Motorway service stations on the M25 motorway	Next clockwise: Cobham services
