= M25 motorway =

Orbital motorway/ring road around Greater London

M25
- London Orbital Motorway
- M25 motorway A282 Dartford Crossing Shown with the UK motorway network

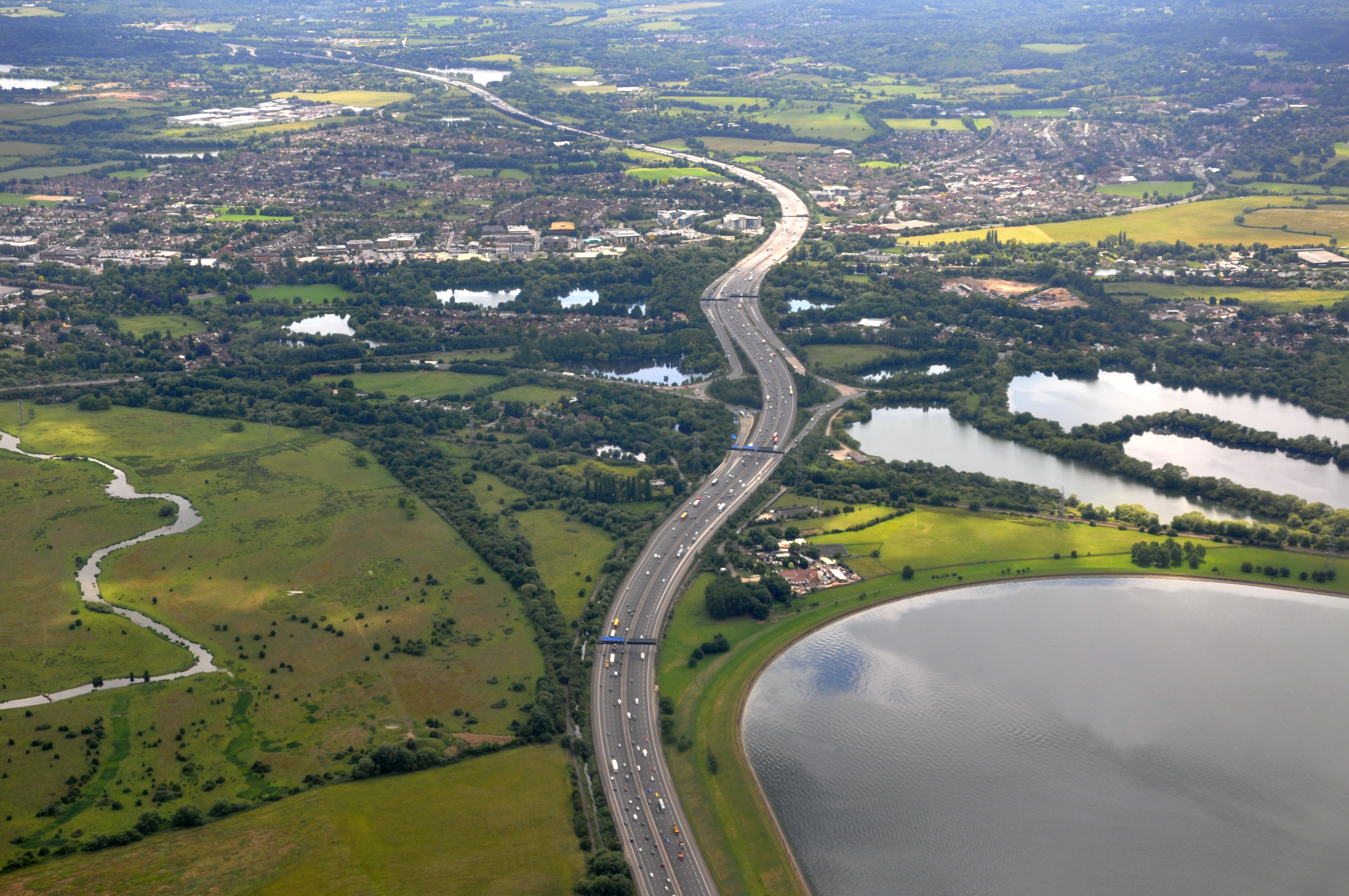
- Junction 13 looking south, 2011

Route information
- Part of E15 and E30
- Maintained by Connect Plus (contracted to National Highways)
- Length: 188 km (117 mi)
- Existed: 1975–present
- History: Opened: 1975; Completed: 29 October 1986

Major junctions
- Orbital around London (in conjunction with the A282)
- Anti-clockwise end: Dartford (Dartford Crossing southern approach)
- J3 → M20 motorway J5 → M26 motorway J7 → M23 motorway J12 → M3 motorway J15 → M4 motorway J16 → M40 motorway J21 → M1 motorway J23 → A1(M) motorway J27 → M11 motorway
- Clockwise end: Thurrock (Dartford Crossing northern approach)

Location
- Country: United Kingdom
- Counties: Kent, Surrey, Berkshire, Greater London, Buckinghamshire, Hertfordshire, Essex
- Primary destinations: London; Dartford Crossing; Sevenoaks; Gatwick Airport; Heathrow Airport; Watford; Stansted Airport; Brentwood; Chelmsford; Romford

Road network
- Roads in the United Kingdom; Motorways; A and B road zones
← M23	→ M26

The M25 or London Orbital Motorway is a major ring road encircling most of Greater London. The 117-mile-long (188 km) motorway is one of the most important roads in the UK and one of the busiest. Margaret Thatcher opened the final section in 1986, making the M25 the longest ring road in Europe upon its opening. (Note: Since the completion of the M25, the Berliner Ring has been completed to run at a slightly longer 196 km (122 mi).) The Dartford Crossing completes the orbital route but is not classed as motorway; it is classed as a trunk road and designated as the A282. In some cases, including notable legal contexts such as the Communications Act 2003, the M25 is used as a de facto alternative boundary for Greater London.

In the 1944 Greater London Plan, Patrick Abercrombie proposed an orbital motorway around London. This evolved into the London Ringways project in the early 1960s, and by 1966 planning had begun on two projects, Ringway 3 to the north and Ringway 4 to the south. By the time the first sections opened in 1975, it was decided the ringways would be combined into a single orbital motorway. The M25 was one of the first motorway projects to consider environmental concerns, and almost 40 public inquiries took place. The road was built as planned, despite some protests that included the section over the North Downs and around Epping Forest which required an extension of the Bell Common Tunnel.

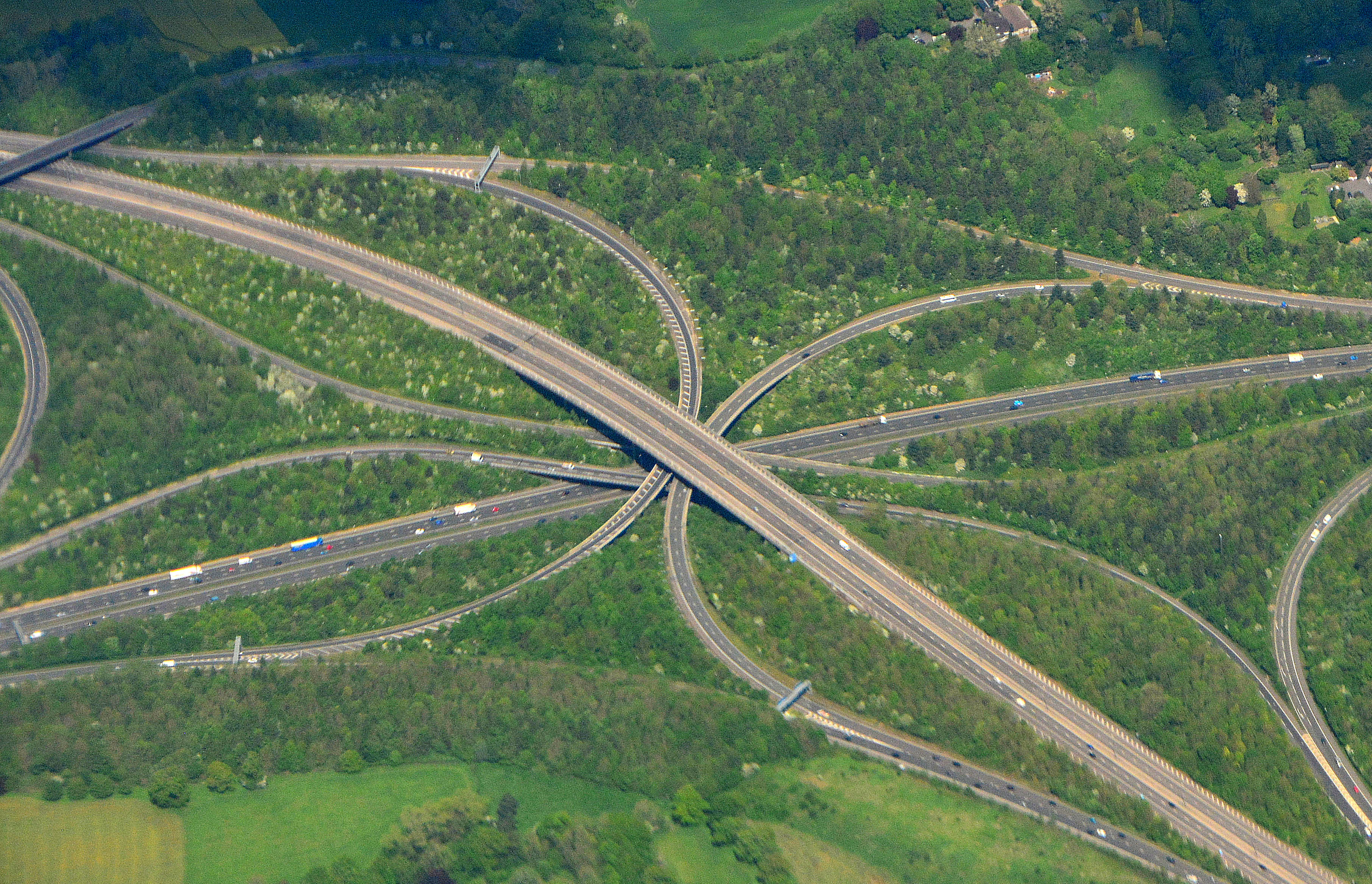
M25 and M23

Although the M25 was popular during construction, it quickly became apparent that there was insufficient traffic capacity. As a consequence of the public inquiries, several junctions merely served local roads where office and retail developments were built, attracting even more traffic onto the M25 than it was designed for. The congestion has led to traffic management schemes that include variable speed limit and smart motorway. Since its opening the M25 has been progressively widened, particularly near Heathrow Airport where it is a dual six-lane carriageway.

== Description ==
=== Route ===
Map of the M25 showing the junction numbers and driver location signs

The M25 almost completely encircles Greater London, and passes briefly through it in the west and the north-east. Junctions 1A–5 are in Kent; 6–13 are in Surrey; 14 and a small part of 15 are in Hillingdon, Greater London; 15–16 are in Buckinghamshire; 17–24 are in Hertfordshire; 25 is in Enfield, Greater London; and 26–31 are in Essex. Law enforcement on the road is carried out by an integrated group made up of the Metropolitan, Thames Valley, Essex, Kent, Hertfordshire and Surrey police services. Primary destinations signed ahead on the motorway include the Dartford Crossing, Sevenoaks, Gatwick Airport, Heathrow Airport, Watford, Stansted Airport and Brentwood.

To the east of London the two ends of the M25 are joined to complete a loop by the non-motorway A282 Dartford Crossing of the River Thames between Thurrock and Dartford. The crossing consists of twin two-lane tunnels and the four-lane QE2 (Queen Elizabeth II) bridge, with a main span of 450 metres (1,480 ft). Passage across the bridge or through the tunnels is subject to a charge between 6 am and 10 pm, its level depending on the kind of vehicle. The road is not under motorway regulations so that other traffic can cross the Thames east of the Woolwich Ferry; (Note: Pedestrians and cyclists cannot directly use the Dartford Crossing, but a shuttle service is available for the latter.) since 2024, when the Gravesend–Tilbury Ferry ceased operating, there has been no public crossing of the Thames further to the east.

At junction 5, the clockwise carriageway of the M25 is routed off the main north–south dual carriageway onto the main east–west dual carriageway, with the main north–south carriageway becoming the A21. In the opposite direction, to the east of the point where the M25 diverges from the main east–west carriageway, that carriageway becomes the M26 motorway. From here to junction 8, the M25 follows the edge of the North Downs close to several historic buildings such as Chevening, Titsey Place, Hever Castle and Chartwell. The interchange with the M23 motorway near Reigate is a four-level stack; one of only a few examples in Britain. Past this, the M25 runs close to the Surrey Hills National Landscape.

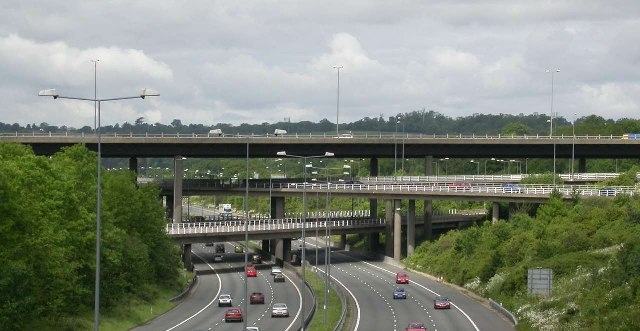
A four level stack interchange at junction 7 with the M23

To the west, the M25 passes close to the edge of Heathrow Airport, and within sight of Windsor Castle. North of this, it goes under the Chalfont Viaduct railway bridge, completed in 1906, which carries the Chiltern Main Line. Red kites can often be seen overhead to the north of this, up to junction 21. The northern section of the M25 passes close to All Saints Pastoral Centre near London Colney, Waltham Abbey and Copped Hall. This section also features two cut-and-cover tunnels, including the Bell Common Tunnel. The north-eastern section of the motorway passes close to North Ockendon, the only settlement of Greater London situated outside the M25. It then runs close to the Rainham Marshes Nature Reserve before reaching the northern end of the Dartford Crossing.

In 2004, following an opinion poll, the London Assembly proposed aligning the Greater London boundary with the M25. (Note: This move would be bound to be resisted by the communities affected, including Watford, Loughton and Epsom.) "Inside the M25" and "outside/beyond the M25" are colloquial, looser alternatives to "Greater London" sometimes used in haulage. The Communications Act 2003 explicitly uses the M25 as the boundary in requiring a proportion of television programmes to be made outside the London area; it states a requirement of "a suitable proportion of the programmes made in the United Kingdom" to be made "in the United Kingdom outside the M25 area", defined in Section 362 as "the area the outer boundary of which is represented by the London Orbital Motorway (M25)".

Sections of the M25 form part of two long-distance E-roads, designated by the United Nations Economic Commission for Europe. The E15, which runs from Inverness to Algeciras, follows the M25 and A282 clockwise from the A1(M) at junction 23 to the M20 at junction 3; while the E30 Cork to Omsk route runs from the M4 at junction 15, clockwise to the A12 at junction 28. The United Kingdom is formally part of the E-roads network but, unlike in other countries, these routes are not marked on any road signs.

=== Features ===
The M25 was originally built mostly as a dual three-lane motorway. Much of this has since been widened to dual four lanes for almost half, to a dual five-lanes section between junctions 12 and 14 and a dual six-lane section between junctions 14 and 15. Further widening is in progress of minor sections with plans for smart motorways in many others.

Two motorway service areas are on the M25, and two others are directly accessible from it. Those on the M25 are Clacket Lane between junctions 5 and 6 (in the south-east) and Cobham between junctions 9 and 10 (in the south-west). Those directly accessible from it are South Mimms off junction 23 (to the north of London) and Thurrock off junction 31 (to the east of London).

As is common with other motorways, the M25 is equipped with emergency ("SOS") telephones. These connect to two National Highways operated control centres at Godstone (for junctions 1 to 15 inclusive) and South Mimms (for 16–31). The Dartford Crossing has a dedicated control centre. There is an extensive network of closed-circuit television (CCTV) on the motorway so incidents can be easily identified and located. A number of 4×4 vehicles patrol the motorway, attempting to keep traffic moving where possible, and assisting the local police. They can act as a rolling roadblock when there are obstacles on the road.

When completed, the M25 only had street lighting for 65 miles (105 km) of its 117-mile (188 km) length. Originally, low pressure sodium (SOX) lighting was the most prominent technology used, but this has been gradually replaced with high-pressure sodium (SON) lighting. As of 2015 the motorway has more than 10,000 streetlights. The M25 has a number of pollution control valves along its length, which can shut off drainage in the event of a chemical or fuel spill.

== History ==
=== Plans ===
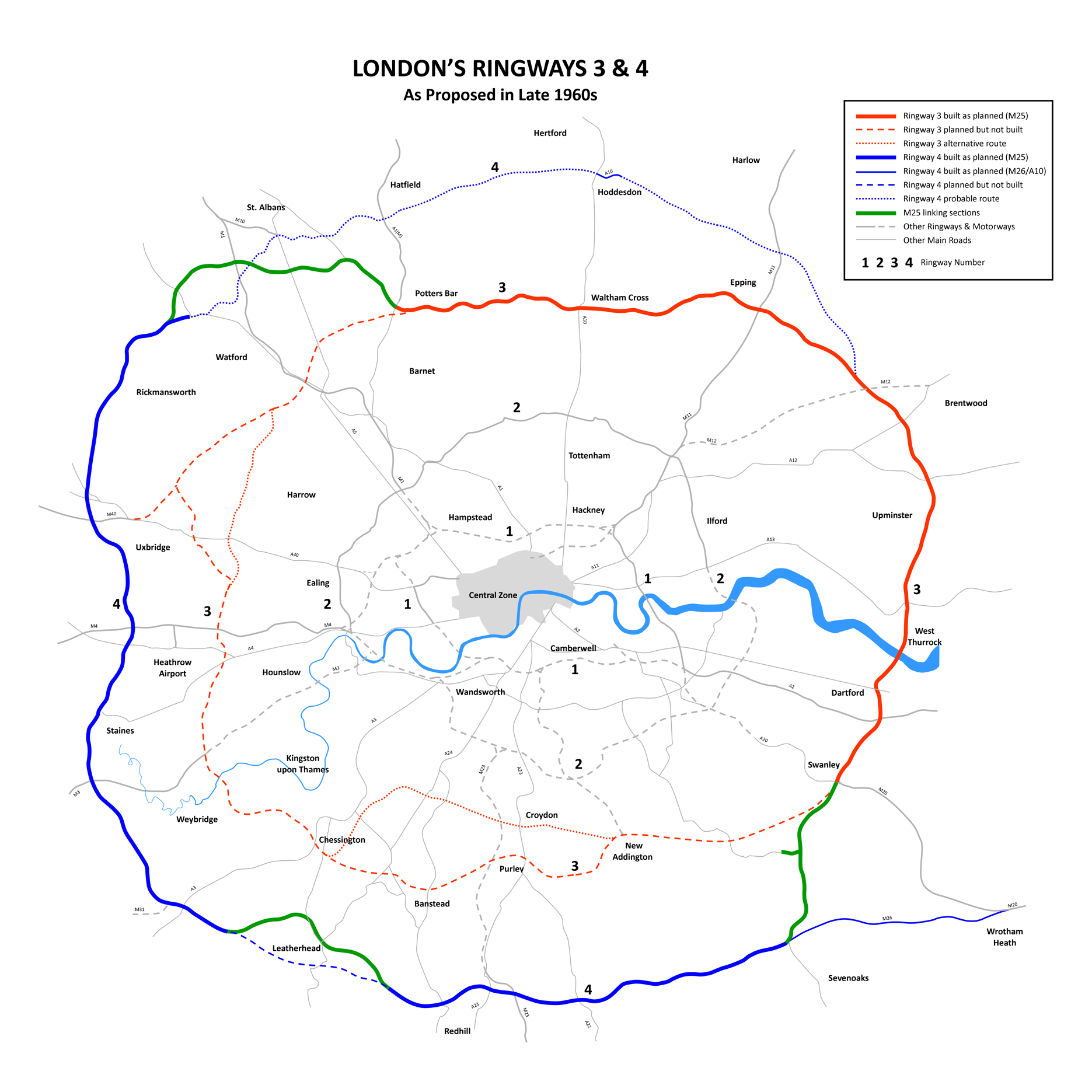
A 1960s map of Ringways 3 & 4 showing sections combining to form the M25

The idea of a general bypass around London was first proposed early in the 20th century. An outer orbital route around the capital had been suggested in 1913, and was re-examined as a motorway route in Sir Charles Bressey's and Sir Edwin Lutyens' The Highway Development Survey, 1937. Sir Patrick Abercrombie's County of London Plan, 1943 and Greater London Plan, 1944 proposed a series of five roads encircling the capital.

The northern sections of the M25 follow a similar route to the Outer London Defence Ring, a concentric series of anti-tank defences and pillboxes designed to slow down a potential German invasion of the capital during World War II. This was marked as the D Ring on Abercombie's plans. Following the war, 11 separate county councils told the Ministry of Transport that an orbital route was "first priority" for London.

Plans stalled because the route was planned to pass through several urban areas, which attracted criticism. The original D Ring through northwest London was intended to be a simple upgrade of streets. In 1951, Middlesex County Council planned a route for the orbital road through the county, passing through Eastcote and west of Bushey, connecting with the proposed M1 motorway, but it was rejected by the Ministry two years later. An alternative route via Harrow and Ealing was proposed, but this was abandoned after the council revealed the extent of property demolition required.

In 1964, the London County Council announced the London Ringways plan, to consist of four concentric motorway rings around London. The following year, the transport minister Barbara Castle announced that the D Ring would be essential to build. The component parts of what became the M25 came from Ringway 3 / M16 motorway in the north and Ringway 4 in the south.

The Ringways plan was controversial owing to the destruction required for the inner two ring roads, (Ringway 1 and Ringway 2). Parts of Ringway 1 were constructed (including the West Cross Route), despite stiff opposition, before the overall plan was postponed in February 1972. In April 1973, the Greater London Council elections resulted in a Labour Party victory; the party then formally announced the cancellation of the Ringways running inside Greater London. This did not affect the routes that would become the M25, because they were planned as central government projects from the outset.

In 1975, following extensive opposition to some parts of Ringway 3 through Middlesex and South London, the transport minister John Gilbert announced that the north section of Ringway 3 already planned would be combined with the southern section of Ringway 4, forming a single orbital motorway to be known as the M25, and the M16 designation was dropped. This scheme required two additional sections to join what were two different schemes, from Swanley to Sevenoaks in the south-east and Hunton Bridge to Potters Bar in the north-west. The section of Ringway 3 west of South Mimms anti-clockwise around London to Swanley in Kent was cancelled.

The most controversial section of the M25 was that between Swanley and Sevenoaks (junctions 3 to 5) in Kent across the Darenth Valley, Badgers Mount and the North Downs. An 1,800-member group named Defend Darenth Valley and the North Downs Action Group (DANDAG) argued that the link was unnecessary, it would damage an Area of Outstanding Natural Beauty and it would be primarily used by local traffic as a bypass for the old A21 road between Farnborough and Sevenoaks. After a length inquiry process, chaired by George Dobry QC, the transport minister Kenneth Clarke announced the motorway would be built as proposed.

== Construction ==
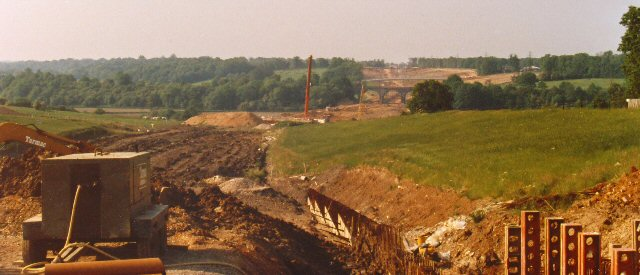
A view north from Higher Denham Fire Station at Tatling End on the A40 in July 1984, with the Chiltern Main Line five-arch 1906 Chalfont Viaduct, originally built to straddle the River Misbourne

There was no individual public inquiry into the M25 as a whole. Each section was presented to planning authorities in its own right and was individually justified, with 39 separate public inquiries relating to sections of the route. The need for the ministry to negotiate with local councils meant that more junctions with local traffic were built than originally proposed. A report in 1981 showed that the M25 had the potential to attract office and retail development along its route, negating the proposed traffic improvements and making Central London a less desirable place to work. None of the motorway was prevented from being built by objections at the public inquiries. However, as a consequence of the backlash against the Ringways, and criticism at the public inquiries, the motorway was built with environmental concerns in mind. New features included additional earth mounds, cuttings and fences that reduced noise, and over two million trees and shrubs to hide the view of the road.

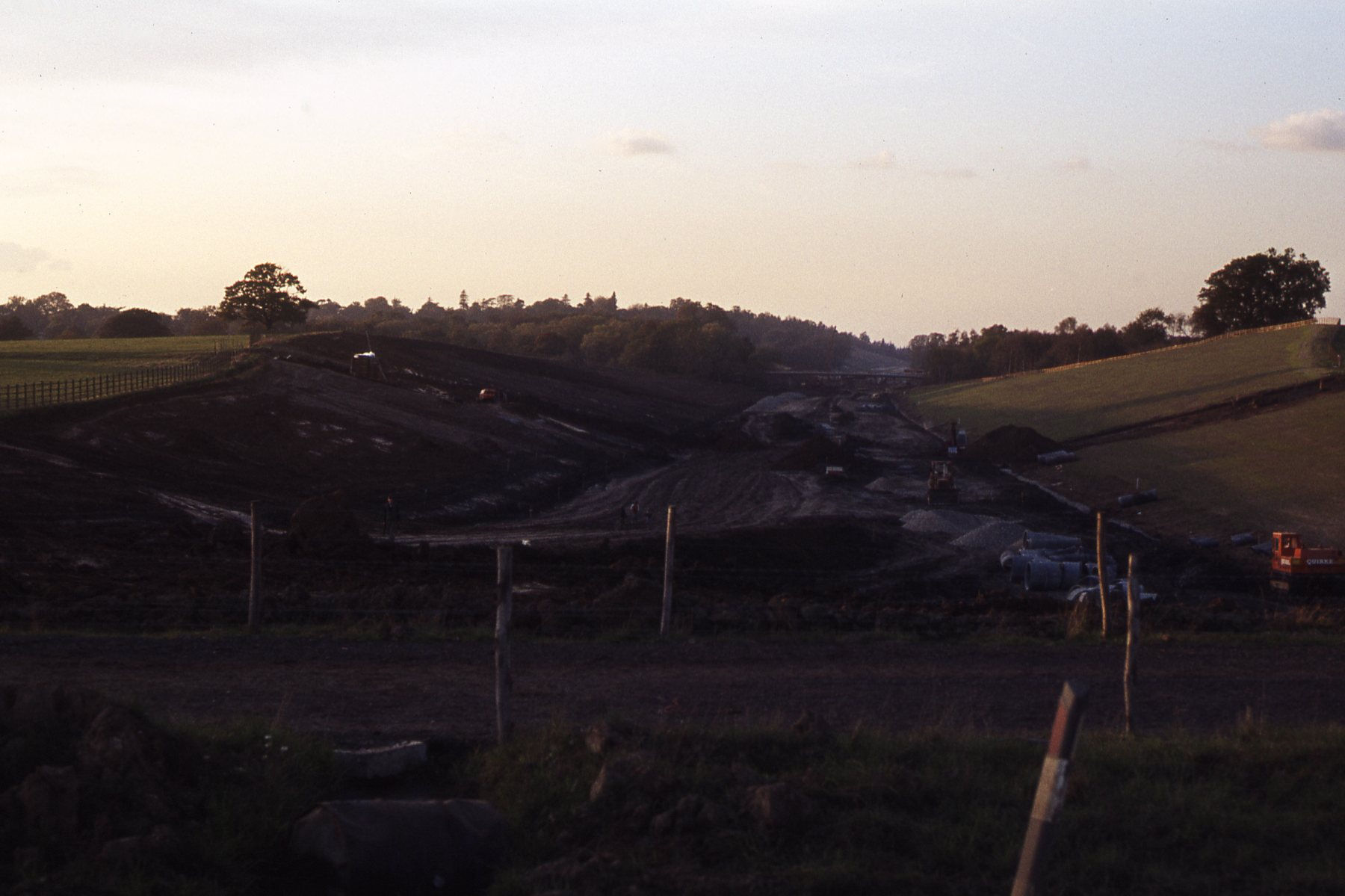
South of Cobham in October 1983

Construction of parts of the two outer ring roads, Ringways 3 and 4, began in 1973. The first section, between South Mimms and Potters Bar in Hertfordshire (junctions 23 to 24) opened in September 1975. It was provisionally known as the M16 and was given the temporary general-purpose road designation A1178.

=== Hunton Bridge ===
A section of the North Orbital Road between Rickmansworth and Hunton Bridge was proposed in 1966, with detailed planning in 1971. The North Orbital Extension was given the go-ahead in January 1973, from Maple Cross. It was 6.2 miles (10.0 km), and was to cost £6.5 million. The road was constructed to motorway standards and opened on Thursday 26 February 1976, as a section of the A405. It eventually became part of the M25's route in 1985.

=== Surrey ===
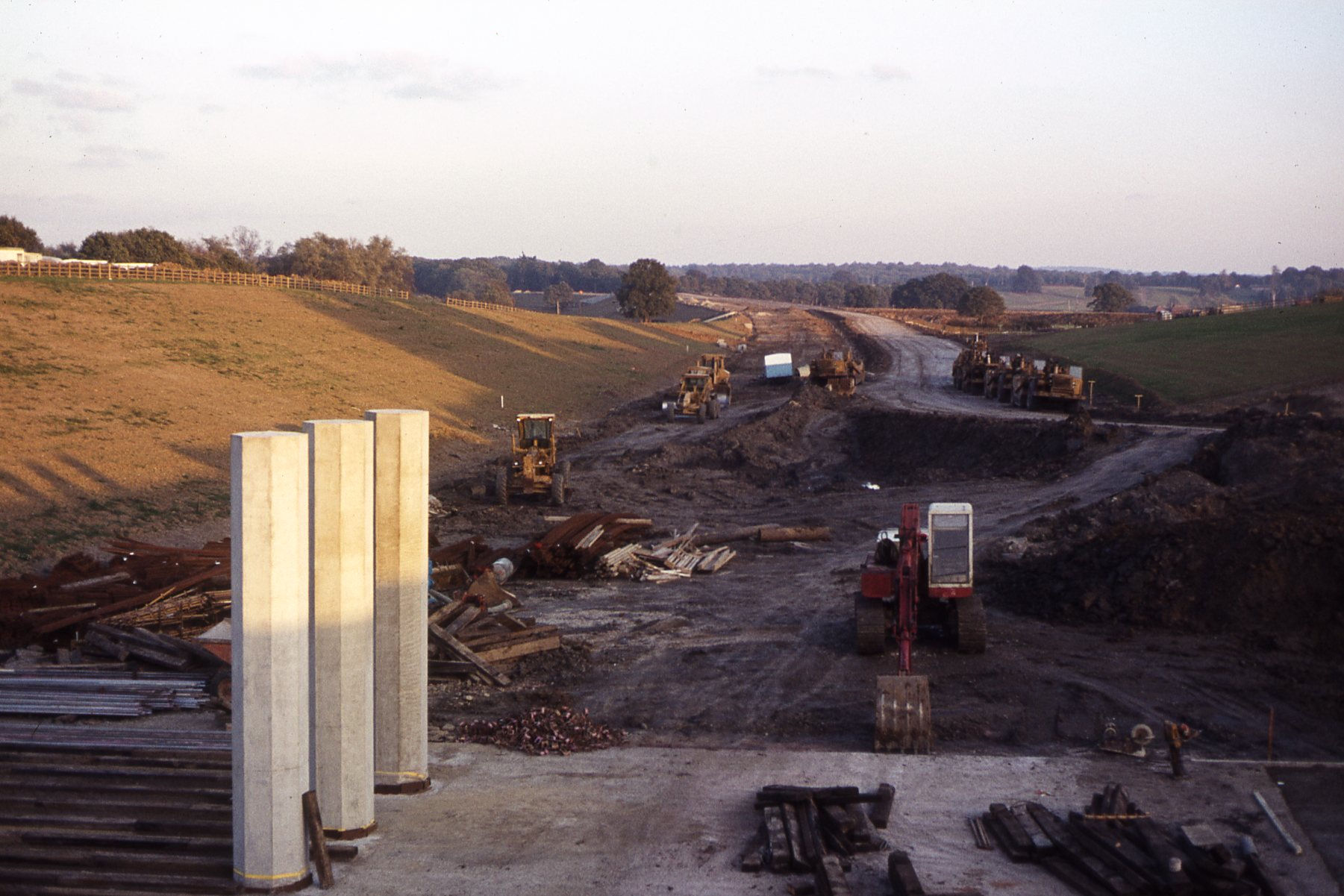
Construction in October 1983

The southern section of what became the M25 through Surrey and Kent was first conceived to be an east–west road south of London to relieve the A25, and running parallel to it, with its eastern end following the route of what is now the M26. It was originally proposed as an all-purpose route, but was upgraded to motorway standard in 1966. It was the first section of the route announced as M25 from the beginning.

The first section from Godstone to Reigate (junctions 6 to 8) was first planned in 1966 and opened in February 1976.

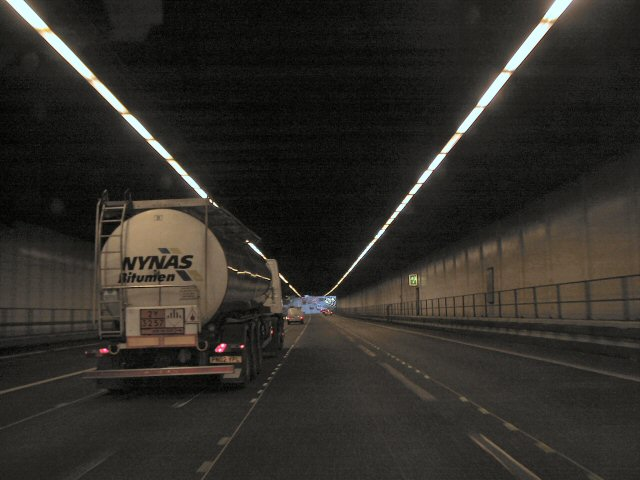
Inside the Bell Common Tunnel near Epping

=== Essex ===
The section from Potters Bar to the Dartford Tunnel was constructed in stages from June 1979 onwards, with the final section between Waltham Cross (junction 25) to Theydon Garnon (junction 27) opening in January 1984. This section, running through Epping Forest, attracted opposition and protests. In 1973, local residents had parked combine harvesters in Parliament Square in protest against the road, draped with large banners reading "Not Epping Likely". As a consequence of this, the Bell Common Tunnel that runs in this area is twice as long as originally proposed.

=== Kent ===
A section of Ringway 3 south of the river between Dartford and Swanley (junctions 1 to 3) was constructed between May 1974 and April 1977.

=== Hertfordshire ===
The section from the M40 motorway to the 1970s North Orbital Road construction (junctions 16 to 17) opened in January 1985. The route under the Chalfont Viaduct meant the motorway was restricted to a width of three lanes in each direction.

The Prime Minister, Margaret Thatcher, officially opened the M25 on 29 October 1986, with a ceremony in the section between junctions 22 to 23 (London Colney and South Mimms). To avoid the threat of road protesters, the ceremony was held a quarter of a mile from the nearest bridge.

The total estimated cost of the motorway was around £1 billion. It required 2 million tonnes (2.2 million short tons) of concrete, 2.5 million tonnes (2.8 million short tons) of asphalt and involved the removal of 49 million cubic metres (1,700 million cubic feet) of spoil.

Upon completion, it was the longest orbital motorway in the world at 117 miles (188 km). At the opening ceremony, Thatcher announced that 98 miles (158 km) had been constructed while the Conservative Party were in office, calling it "a splendid achievement for Britain". A 58-page brochure was published, commemorating the completion of the motorway.

== Operational history ==
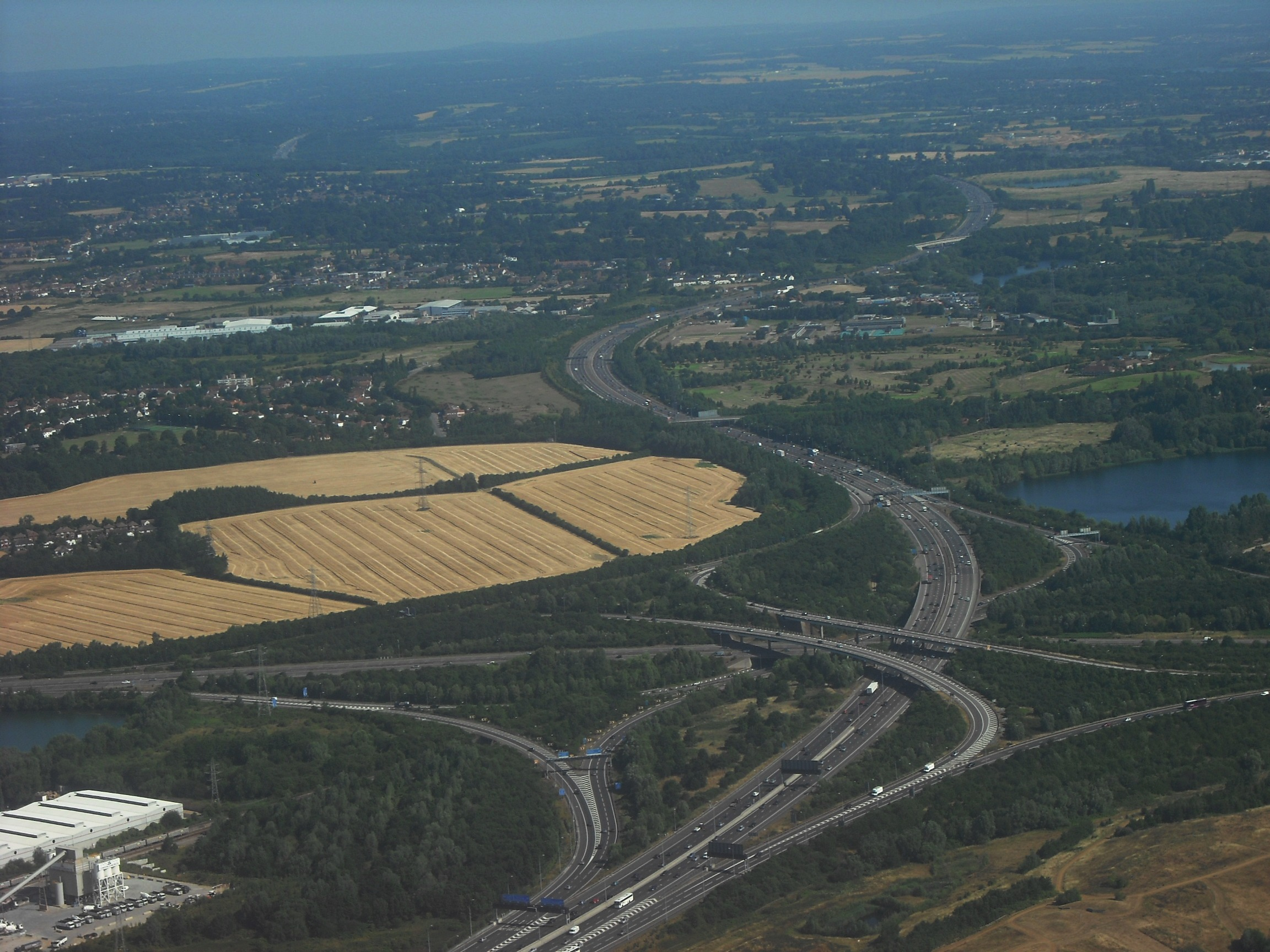
Junction 15 on the M4/M25 motorway junction, near Heathrow Airport

The M25 was initially popular with the public. In the 1987 general election, the Conservatives won in every constituency that the motorway passed through, in particular gaining Thurrock from Labour. Coach tours were organised for a trip around the new road. However, it quickly became apparent that the M25 suffered from chronic congestion. A report in The Economist said it "had taken 70 years to plan [the motorway], 12 to build it and just one to find it was inadequate". Thatcher rebuked the negative response, calling it "carping and criticism".

Traffic levels quickly exceeded the maximum design capacity. Two months before it opened, the government admitted that the three-lane section between junctions 11 and 13 was inadequate and that it would have to be widened to four. In 1990, the Secretary of State for Transport announced plans to widen the whole of the M25 to four lanes. By 1993, the motorway, designed for a maximum of 88,000 vehicles per day, was carrying 200,000. At that time, the M25 carried 15% of UK motorway traffic and there were plans to add six lanes to the section from junctions 12 to 15, as well as widening the rest of the motorway to four lanes.

In parts, particularly the western third, that plan went ahead. Again, however, plans to widen further sections to eight lanes (four each way) were scaled back in 2009 in response to rising costs. The plans were reinstated in the agreed Highways Agency 2013–14 business plan.

In June 1992, the Department for Transport (DfT) announced a proposal to widen the section close to Heathrow Airport to fourteen lanes by way of three additional link roads. That attracted fierce opposition from anti-motorway protesters who were critical of the Newbury Bypass and other schemes, but also from local authorities. Surrey County Council led a formal objection to the widening scheme, and it was cancelled shortly afterwards. In 1994, the Standing Advisory Committee on Trunk Road Appraisal published a report saying that "the M25 experience most probably does ... serve as an example of a case where roads generate traffic" and that further improvements to the motorway were counter-productive. In April 1995, the Transport Minister Brian Mawhinney announced that the Heathrow link roads would be scrapped.

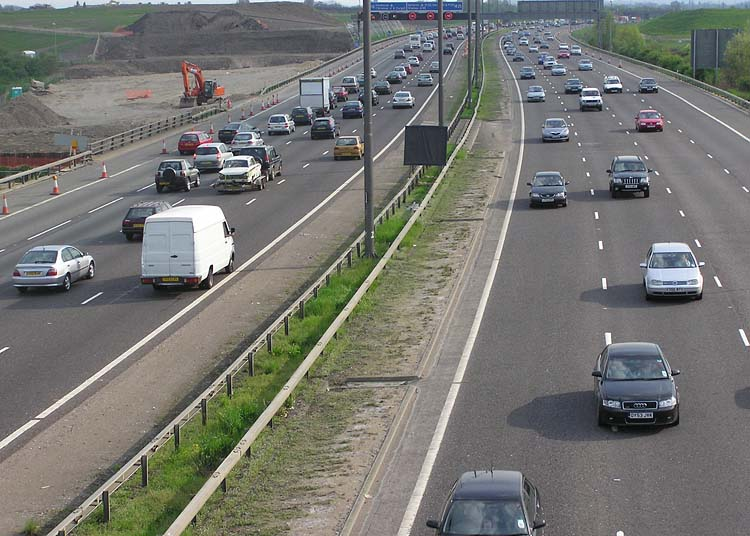
The M25 motorway near Heathrow, showing a MIDAS installed gantry

In 1995, a contract was awarded to widen the section between junctions 8 and 10 from six to eight lanes at a cost of £93.4 million, and a Motorway Incident Detection and Automatic Signalling (MIDAS) system was introduced from junction 10 to junction 15 in 1995, at a cost of £13.5M. That was extended to junction 16 in 2002, at a cost of £11.7M. The system consists of a distributed network of traffic and weather sensors, speed cameras and variable-speed signs, that control traffic speeds with little human supervision. It has improved traffic flow slightly, reducing the amount of start-stop driving.

After Labour won the 1997 election, the road budget was cut from £6 billion to £1.4 billion. However, the DfT announced new proposals to widen the section between junction 12 (M3) and junction 15 (M4) to 12 lanes. At the Heathrow Terminal 5 public inquiry, a Highways Agency official said that the widening was needed to accommodate traffic to the proposed new terminal, but the transport minister said that no such evidence had been given. Environmental groups objected to the decision to go ahead with a scheme to create the widest motorways in the UK, without holding a public inquiry. Friends of the Earth claimed the real reason for the widening was to support Terminal 5. The decision was again deferred. A ten-lane scheme was announced in 1998, and the £148 million 'M25 Jct 12 to 15 Widening' contract was awarded to Balfour Beatty in 2003. The scheme was completed in 2005, with dual-five lanes between junctions 12 and 14 and dual-six lanes from junctions 14 to 15.

In 2007, junction 25 (A10/Waltham Cross) was remodelled to increase capacity. The nearby Holmesdale Tunnel was widened to three lanes in an easterly direction, and an additional left-turn lane added from the A10 onto the motorway. The total cost was £75 million.

Work to widen the exit slip-roads in both directions at junction 28 (A12 / A1023) was completed in 2008. That was designed to reduce the amount of traffic queuing on the slip roads at busy periods, particularly traffic from the clockwise M25 joining the northbound A12. In 2018, a new scheme was proposed, because the junction had reached capacity, accommodating over 7,500 vehicles per hour. The scheme involved building a two-lane link road between the M25 and the A12. The work was expected to be completed around 2021/22.

== Widening ==
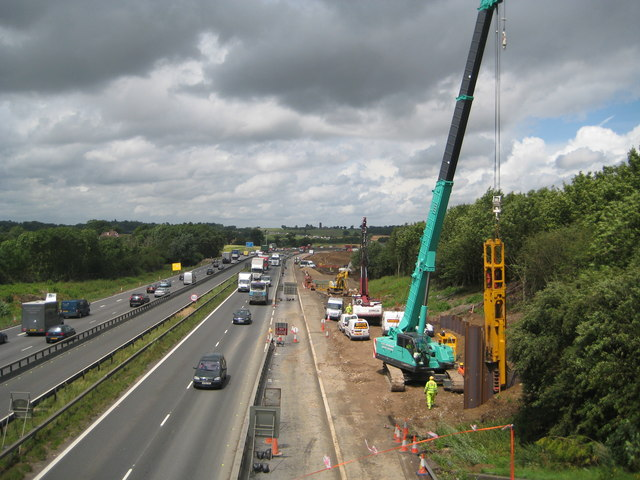
Widening the M25 Motorway near South Mimms

In 2006, the Highways Agency proposed widening 63 miles (101 km) of the M25 from six to eight lanes, between junctions 5 and 6, and 16 to 30, as part of a Design, Build, Finance and Operate (DBFO) project. A shortlist of contractors was announced in October 2006 for the project, which was expected to cost £4.5 billion. Contractors were asked to resubmit their bids in January 2008, and in June 2009 the new transport minister indicated that the cost had risen to £5.5 billion and the benefit to cost ratio had dropped considerably.

In January 2009 the government scrapped plans to widen the sections from junctions 5 to 7 and 23 to 27 and that hard shoulder running would be introduced instead. Widening to four lanes was reinstated in the 2013–14 Highways Agency Business Plan.

In 2009, a £6.2 billion M25 DBFO private finance initiative contract was awarded to Connect Plus to widen the sections between junctions 16 to 23 and 27 to 30, and maintain the M25 and the Dartford Crossing for a 30-year period.

Work to widen the section between junctions 16 (M40) and 23 (A1(M)) to dual four lanes started in July 2009 at an estimated cost of £580 million. The junction 16 to 21 (M1) section was completed by July 2011 and the junction 21 to 23 by June 2012. Works to widen the junctions 27 (M11) to 30 (A13) section to dual four lanes also started in July 2009. The junction 27 to 28 (A12) section was completed in July 2010, and the junction 28 to 29 (A127) in June 2011, and the junction 29 to 30 (A13) section opened in May 2012.

Work to introduce smart motorway technology and permanent hard shoulder running on two sections of the M25 began in 2013. The first section between junctions 5 (A21/M26) and 7 (M23) started construction in May 2013 with the scheme being completed and opened in April 2014. The second section, between junctions 23 (A1/A1(M)) and 27 (M11), began construction in February 2013 and was completed and opened in November 2014.

In December 2016, Highways England completed the capacity project at junction 30 (Thurrock) as part of the Thames Gateway Delivery Plan. The £100 million scheme included widening the M25 to four lanes, adding additional link roads, and improvements to drainage.

Work began to widen the M25 and A3 around junction 10 in November 2022. The project is intended to limit congestion at the junction and allow traffic to proceed more safely. However, these plans caused concerns about the amount of woodland that would be required.

In March 2024, National Highways announced the first all-day closure of the M25 in its operational history. The motorway was closed between junctions 10 and 11 from 15–18 March in order to remove a bridleway bridge. The road was closed completely for two other occasions that year, with a final two closures scheduled for 2025.

== Traffic ==
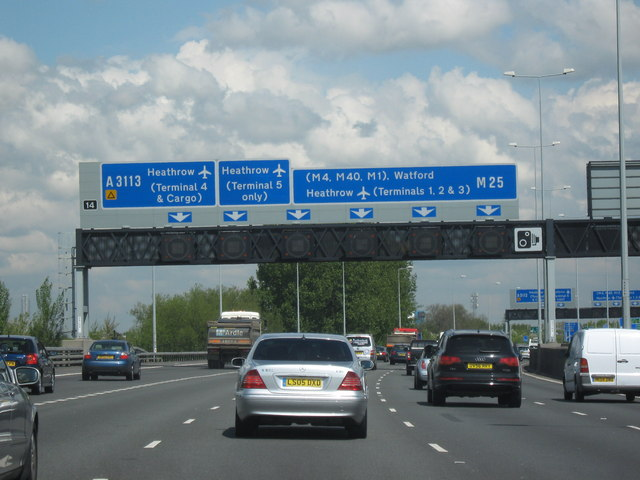
Near Heathrow Airport, the M25 is six lanes wide in each direction.

The M25 is one of Europe's busiest motorways. In 2003, a maximum of 196,000 vehicles a day were recorded just south of Heathrow, between junctions 13 and 14. The stretch between the nearby junctions 14 and 15 consistently records the highest daily traffic counts on the British strategic road network, with the average flow in 2018 being 219,492 vehicles (lower than the record peak measured in 2014 of 262,842).

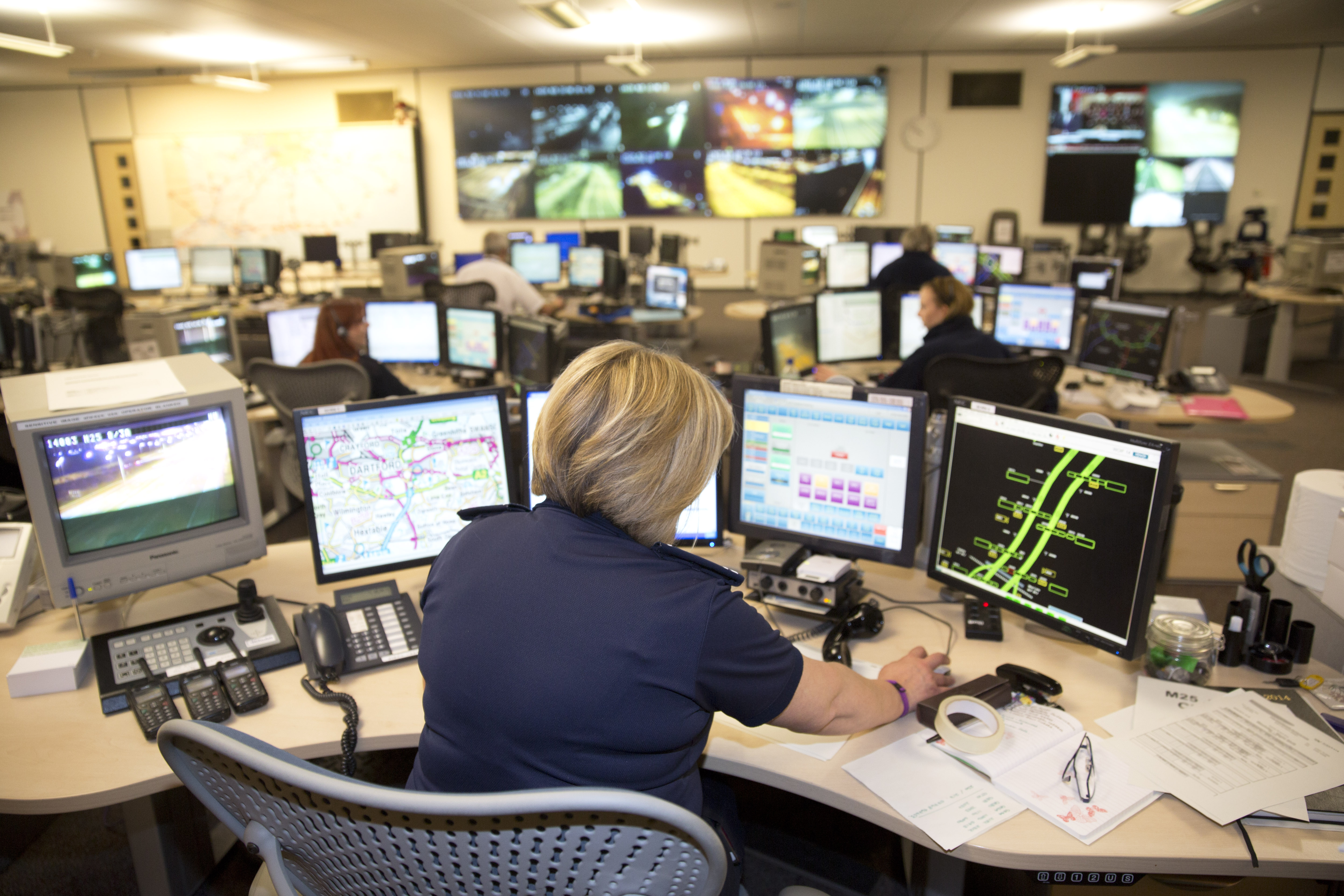
A control room for the M25 junction 5–7 smart motorway scheme

Traffic on the M25 is monitored by Connect Plus Services on behalf of National Highways. The company operates a series of transportable CCTV cameras that can be easily moved into congestion hotspots, allowing operators to have a clear view of the motorway and so assess what might be done to tackle particular areas of congestion. Prior to its liquidation in 2018, Carillion was subcontracted to manage traffic on the M25, delivering live alerts from body-worn cameras via 3G, 4G and Wi-Fi.

Since 1995, sections of the M25 have been equipped with variable speed limits, which slow traffic in the event of congestion or an obstruction, and help manage the traffic flow. The scheme was originally trialled between junctions 10 and 16, and was made a permanent fixture in 1997.

The Dartford Crossing is the only fixed vehicle crossing of the Thames east of Greater London. It is also the busiest crossing in the United Kingdom, and consequently puts pressure on M25 traffic. Users of the crossing do not pay a toll, but rather a congestion charge. The signs at the crossing are the same as those deployed over the London congestion charge zone.

In 2009, the Department for Transport published options for a new Lower Thames Crossing to add capacity to the Dartford Crossing, or create a new road and crossing linking to the M2 and M20 motorways. Plans for that stalled, and were cancelled in 2013 by the Mayor of London, Boris Johnson, being replaced by a proposed Gallions Reach Crossing. Initially seen as a straight ferry replacement for the Woolwich Ferry, it was later mooted as a bridge or tunnel. By 2019, the plans had changed, with the Docklands Light Railway to be extended to Thamesmead instead.

In March 2025 the Lower Thames Crossing was approved.

== Incidents ==
On 11 December 1984, nine people died and ten were injured in a multiple-vehicle collision between junctions 5 and 6. Twenty-six vehicles were involved when dense fog descended suddenly.

On 16 December 1988, several vehicles were stolen and used as getaway for acts of murder and robbery, using the M25 to quickly move between targets. The M25 Three, including Raphael Rowe, were tried and sentenced to life imprisonment in 1990. Their convictions were overturned in 2000 and Rowe, who studied journalism while in prison, became an investigative journalist for the BBC.

In 1996, Kenneth Noye murdered Stephen Cameron in a road rage incident while stopped at traffic lights on an M25 junction in Kent. He was convicted in 2000 and sentenced to life imprisonment. He was released in June 2019.

In November 2014, during overnight roadworks, a 16-foot (4.9 m) piece of road surface near junction 9 at Leatherhead failed to set correctly due to rain. This created a 1-foot (0.30 m) pothole in the road and caused a 12-mile (19 km) tailback. The Minister for Transport John Hayes criticised the work and the resulting traffic problems.

The M25 has had problems with animals and birds on the carriageway. In 2009, the Highways Agency reported that they had been called out several times a week to remove a swan from the motorway around junction 13. There have been several crashes resulting in horses escaping their horseboxes onto the carriageway.

=== Racing ===
The motorway has attracted unofficial, and illegal, motor racing. At the end of the 1980s, before the advent of automated speed enforcement devices, owners of supercars would meet at night at service stations such as South Mimms and conduct time trials. Times below 1 hour were achieved – an average speed of over 117 mph (188 km/h), which included coming to a halt at the Dartford Tunnel road user charge payment booths. The winner received champagne rather than money. The Enfield Gazette referred to an "M25 club", and posters appeared near the M25 advertising the "First London Cannonball Run". The racing had mostly disappeared by the end of the 1980s after speed cameras were introduced.

=== Insulate Britain protests ===
In 2021, several sections of the M25 were disrupted after the home energy and insulation campaign group Insulate Britain blocked junctions including Nos. 3 (Swanley), 6 (Godstone), 14 (Heathrow), 20 (Kings Langley) and 31 (Lakeside). A spokesman for the AA said the actions were counterproductive, as they would cause increased vehicle emissions owing to delays, as well having a negative effect on the economy. 92 people were arrested following the first incident on 13 September, followed by a further 70 two days later. Insulate Britain said they would continue to disrupt the M25 until the government responded.

On 29 October, two days before the 2021 United Nations Climate Change Conference, Insulate Britain protests blocked traffic from junctions 21 to 22 in Hertfordshire and 28 to 29 in Essex. 19 arrests were made.

== Cultural references ==
The M25 is a form of social control to ensure disruptive elements in society are neutralised by keeping a significant proportion of them in continual motion.

— Will Self

The M25 and the Dartford Crossing are known for frequent traffic jams. This was noticed before the entire road had been completed; at the official opening ceremony Margaret Thatcher complained about "those who carp and criticise". The jams have inspired derogatory names, such as "Britain's Biggest Car Park" and songs (e.g., Chris Rea's "The Road to Hell"). Nevertheless, coach tours around the M25 have continued to run into the 21st century.

The M25 plays a role in the comedy-fantasy novel Good Omens, as "evidence for the hidden hand of Satan in the affairs of Man". The demon character, Crowley, had manipulated the design of the M25 to resemble a Satanic sigil, and tried to ensure it would anger as many people as possible to drive them off the path of good. The lengthy series of public inquiries for motorways throughout the 1970s, particularly the M25, influenced the opening of The Hitchhiker's Guide to the Galaxy, where the Earth is destroyed to make way for a hyperspace bypass.

The M25 enjoyed a more positive reputation among ravers in the late 1980s, when this new orbital motorway became a popular route to the parties that took place around the outskirts of London. Its use for these raves inspired the name of the electronic duo Orbital (who originated from just outside the M25 in Sevenoaks).

Iain Sinclair's 2002 book and film London Orbital is based on a year-long journey around the M25 on foot.

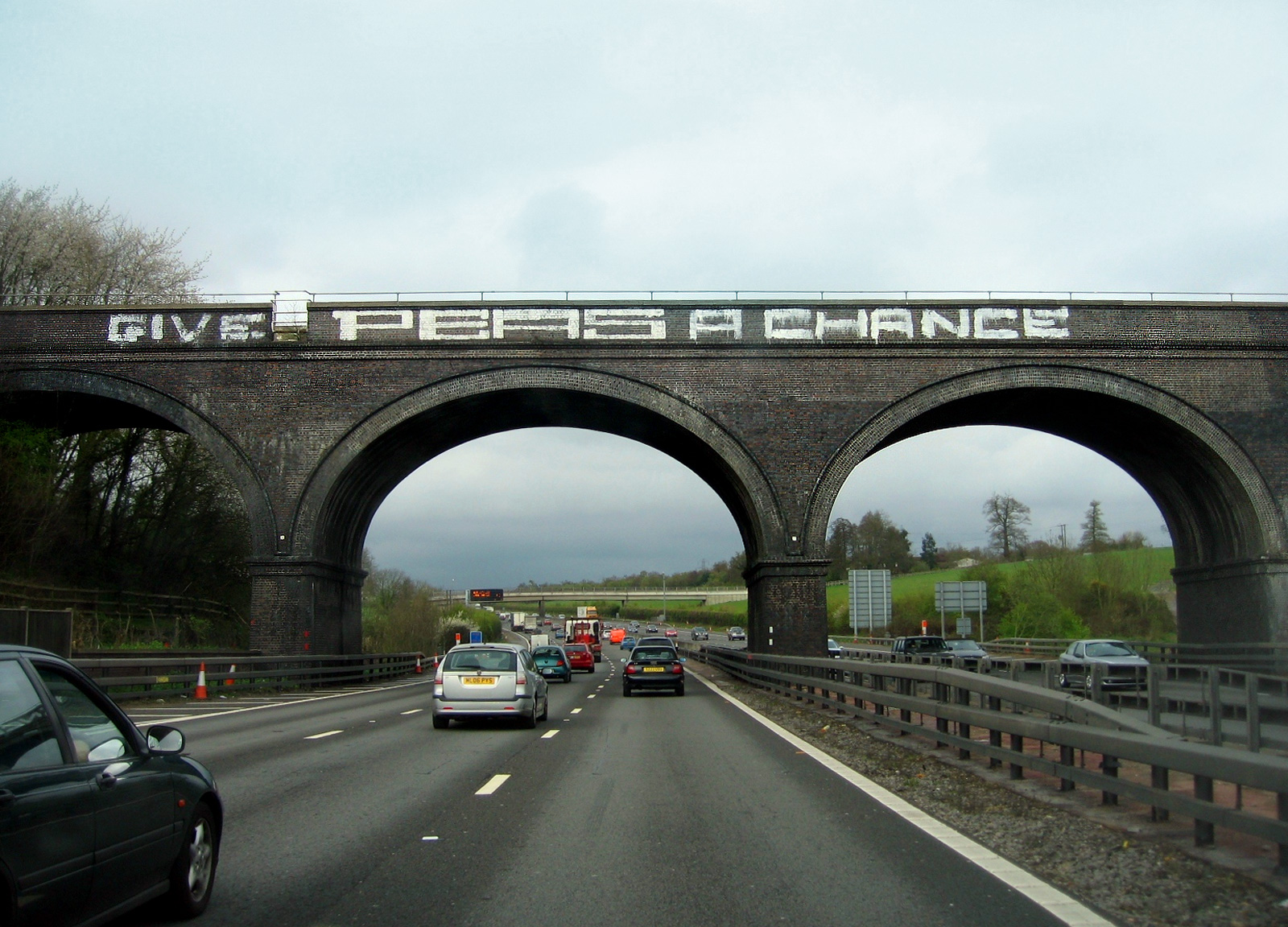
The "Give Peas a chance" graffiti on the Chalfont Viaduct, before its removal in 2018

A piece of graffiti on the Chalfont Viaduct, clearly visible from the M25 and reading "Give Peas a chance" (parodying John Lennon's "Give Peace a Chance") became popular with the public, attracting its own Facebook group. The message originally read "Peas", supposedly the tag of a London graffiti artist; the rest of the wording is reported to have referred to his frequent clashes with the law. In September 2018, after 10 years, the graffiti was vandalised and then removed and replaced with the message "Give Helch a break". A spokesman for Network Rail sympathised with the requests to restore the "much-loved graffiti", but said they do not condone people putting their lives at risk by trespassing.

== Junctions and services ==
Data from driver location signs provide carriageway identifier information. The numbers on the signs are kilometres from a point on the north side of the Dartford Crossing, while the letter is "A" for the clockwise carriageway and "B" for the anticlockwise. They are spaced every 500 metres (1,600 ft).

The M25 has been criticised for having too many junctions; 14 of them serve only local roads. In 2016, Edmund King, president of the Automobile Association, attributed congestion on the M25 to excessive junctions. This leads to "junction hoppers" who only use the motorway for a short distance before exiting; their difference in speed when entering and leaving the main carriageway causes a domino effect, resulting in all vehicles slowing down. Drivers who only use the M25 to travel a short distance are believed by some to have less overall driving experience, exacerbating traffic and safety issues.

The M25 originally opened without any service areas. The first, at South Mimms, was opened by Margaret Thatcher in June 1987, a week before the election. Thatcher admired the practical and no-frills architecture of Charles Forte and praised him in her opening speech. The second, Clacket Lane, was opened by Robert Key, Minister for Roads and Traffic, on 21 July 1993. Construction was delayed as the remains of a Roman villa were found on the site, requiring archaeological research. The other service area between junctions is Cobham, which opened on 13 September 2012.

A282 (Dartford Crossing)
miles	km (Note: The table gives details of each junction, including the roads interchanged and the destinations that are signed from the motorway on the blue advance direction signs. Figures in kilometres are from the driver location signs; figures in miles are derived from them.)	Clockwise exits (A carriageway)	Junction	Anti-clockwise exits (B carriageway)	Opening date
0.0	0.0	Dartford Crossing South (Queen Elizabeth II Bridge)	River Thames	Dartford Crossing North (Dartford Tunnels)	November 1963 (west tunnel); May 1980 (east tunnel); October 1991 (bridge)
		Entering Kent		Entering Essex	
3.5	5.7	Swanscombe, Erith, Bluewater A206	J1A (Note: Junctions 1A and 1B are part of the A282, though they use the M25's numbering scheme.)	Swanscombe, Erith A206	September 1986
4.7	7.5	Dartford A225	J1B	No Exit (Slip roads meet the Junction 2 roundabout)	September 1986
M25
5.5	8.8	London (SE & C), Bexleyheath A2; Canterbury (M2); Ebbsfleet International Non Motorway Traffic	J2	London (SE & C), Bexleyheath, Bluewater A2; Canterbury (M2); Dartford (A225); Ebbsfleet International	September 1986 (northbound); April 1977 (southbound)
8.7	14.0	Dover, Channel Tunnel, Maidstone M20; London (SE), Swanley A20	J3	London (SE & C), Lewisham A20; Channel Tunnel, Maidstone M20	April 1977 (northbound); February 1986 (southbound)
12.2	19.6	Bromley A21; Orpington A224	J4	London (SE), Bromley A21; Orpington A224	February 1986
16.3; 16.4	26.2; 26.4	Sevenoaks, Hastings A21	J5	Dover, Channel Tunnel, Maidstone; M26 (M20); Sevenoaks, Hastings A21	July 1980
		Entering Surrey		Entering Kent	
21.0	33.8	Clacket Lane services	Services	Clacket Lane services	July 1993
25.8	41.6	Eastbourne, Godstone, Caterham A22; Redhill, Westerham (A25)	J6	Eastbourne, Godstone, Caterham A22; Westerham (A25)	November 1979 (eastbound); February 1976 (westbound)
28.6	46.0	Brighton, Crawley; Gatwick; Croydon; M23	J7	Croydon; Brighton, Gatwick; M23	February 1976
31.9	51.4	Reigate, Sutton A217; Kingston (A240)	J8	Reigate, Sutton A217; Redhill (A25)	February 1976 (eastbound); October 1985 (westbound)
38.5; 39.5	62.0; 63.5	Leatherhead A243; Dorking (A24)	J9	Leatherhead A243; Dorking (A24)	October 1985
42.6; 43.2	68.6; 69.5	Cobham services	Services	Cobham services	September 2012
45.0	72.4	Portsmouth, Guildford, London (SW & C); A3	J10	London (SW), Kingston, Guildford, Portsmouth; A3	October 1985 (eastbound); December 1983 (westbound)
49.8	80.2	Woking A320; Chertsey A317	J11	Chertsey A317; Woking A320	December 1983 (southbound); October 1980 (northbound)
52.1	83.8	Basingstoke, Southampton; Richmond; M3	J12	The SOUTH WEST, Southampton; London (SW & C), Richmond; M3	October 1980 (southbound); December 1976 (northbound)
		Entering Berkshire		Entering Surrey	
		Entering Surrey		Entering Berkshire	
55.2	88.8	London (W), Hounslow, Staines A30	J13	London (W), Hounslow, Staines A30	November 1981 (southbound); August 1982 (northbound)
		Entering Greater London		Entering Surrey	
57.0	91.8	Heathrow (Terminals 4, 5 & Cargo) A3113	J14	Heathrow (Terminals 4, 5 & Cargo) A3113	August 1982 (southbound); September 1985 (northbound)
		Entering Buckinghamshire		Entering Greater London	
59.0	95.0	The WEST, Reading, Slough; London (W & C), Heathrow (Terminals 1, 2 & 3); M4	J15	London (W), Heathrow (Terminals 1, 2 & 3); The WEST, Slough, Reading; M4	September 1985
63.8	102.6	Birmingham, Oxford; Uxbridge, London (W); M40	J16	Uxbridge, London (W & C); Birmingham, Oxford; M40	September 1985 (southbound); January 1985 (northbound)
		Entering Hertfordshire		Entering Buckinghamshire	
68.7	110.5	Rickmansworth, Maple Cross A412	J17	Maple Cross A412	January 1985 (southbound); February 1976 (northbound)
69.9	112.5	Amersham, Chorleywood A404	J18	Amersham, Chorleywood, Rickmansworth A404	February 1976
71.5	116.4	Watford A41	J19	Exit via J20 – Watford A41	September 1976
73.5	118.2	Aylesbury, Hemel Hempstead A41	J20	Aylesbury, Hemel Hempstead, Watford A41	August 1986
76.3	122.8	The NORTH; Luton; M1	J21	The NORTH; Luton; M1	August 1986
76.9	123.7	(M1 South); St Albans, London (NW & C) A405	J21A	(M1 South); St Albans, London (NW & C), Watford A405	August 1986
80.6	129.7	St Albans A1081	J22	St Albans A1081	August 1986
83.3	134.0	Hatfield A1(M); London (N & C) A1; Barnet A1081; South Mimms services	J23	London (N & C) A1; Barnet A1081; Hatfield A1(M); South Mimms services	August 1986 (westbound); September 1975 (eastbound)
85.9	138.2	Potters Bar A111	J24	Potters Bar A111	September 1975 (westbound); June 1981 (eastbound)
		Entering Greater London		Entering Hertfordshire	
91.4	147.1	London (N & C); Enfield, Hertford A10	J25	London (N & C); Enfield, Hertford A10	June 1981 (westbound); January 1984 (eastbound)
		Holmesdale Tunnel	Tunnel	Holmesdale Tunnel	January 1984
		Entering Essex		Entering Greater London	
94.9	152.7	Waltham Abbey, Loughton A121	J26	Waltham Abbey, Loughton A121	January 1984
		Bell Common Tunnel	Tunnel	Bell Common Tunnel	January 1984
99.2	159.7	Cambridge, Stansted, Harlow; London (N & E); M11	J27	London (NE & C); Cambridge, Harlow, Stansted; M11	January 1984 (westbound); April 1983 (eastbound)
		Entering Greater London		Entering Essex	
107.1	172.4	Chelmsford, London (E & C), Romford A12; Brentwood A1023	J28	Chelmsford A12; Brentwood A1023	April 1983
		Entering Essex		Entering Greater London	
		Entering Greater London		Entering Essex	54.17005°N 2.73748°W
109.9	176.8	Southend, Southend Airport, Basildon A127	J29	London (E & C), Romford, Southend, Southend Airport, Basildon A127	April 1983 (northbound); December 1982 (southbound)
		Entering Essex		Entering Greater London	
115.2	185.4	Tilbury, Thurrock, Lakeside, London (E & C) A13; Thurrock services	J30	London (E & C), Tilbury, Thurrock, Lakeside A13; Thurrock services Non Motorway Traffic	December 1982
A282 (Dartford Crossing)
115.9	186.6	No Exit (Slip roads meet the Junction 30 roundabout)	J31	Thurrock, Lakeside A1306; Purfleet (A1090); West Thurrock (A126); Thurrock services	December 1982
		Dartford Crossing South (Queen Elizabeth II Bridge)	River Thames	Dartford Crossing North (Dartford Tunnels)	November 1963 (west tunnel); May 1980 (east tunnel); October 1991 (bridge)
		Entering Kent		Entering Essex	
Notes: Distances in kilometres and carriageway identifiers are obtained from driver location signs/location marker posts. Where a junction spans several hundred metres and the data is available, both the start and finish values for the junction are shown.
1.000 mi = 1.609 km; 1.000 km = 0.621 mi: Incomplete access; Tolled
