= Motorway Incident Detection and Automatic Signalling =

Road traffic sensor

Motorway Incident Detection and Automatic Signalling, usually abbreviated to MIDAS, is a UK distributed network of traffic sensors, using either inductive loops, or using Radar (being trialled by AGD Technologies and Wavetronix) and magneto-resistive wireless sensors (by Clearview Intelligence), which are designed to alert the local regional control centre (RCC) to traffic flow and average speeds, and set variable message signs and advisory speed limits (or mandatory speed limits on smart motorways) with little human intervention. Companies such as RAC, TomTom and Google use this traffic flow data via halogens reporting systems.

Originally installed on the congested western stretch of the M25 motorway, much of the M60 motorway around Manchester and the Birmingham box (M6, M5 and M42), MIDAS has been installed on all but the most minor stretches of UK motorway. The system has successfully reduced accidents. Additionally, the system is installed on parts of the non-motorway trunk road network including the A14. Although all stretches with MIDAS have at least small signals in the central reservation to show advisory speed limits for the whole carriageway, major motorways often also have text variable message signs, and on the busiest stretches, lane control signals above each lane. Additionally, many motorways, called smart motorways, have now been equipped with the newest signs and signals for variable mandatory speed limits and lane control.

The system replaced the Automatic Incident Detection (AID) system which was trialled in 1989 on an 83 kilometres (52 mi) section of the M1 motorway. MIDAS was first operated on the M25 in the SouthWest quadrant before the section went live with a variable speed limit.

By March 2006, National Highways aimed to have MIDAS installed on more than 910 kilometres (565 mi) of the English motorway network.

== See also ==
- Electronic Monitoring and Advisory System - a similar system in Singapore
- Freeway Traffic Management System
