= Chalfont Viaduct =

Railway viaduct in south-east England

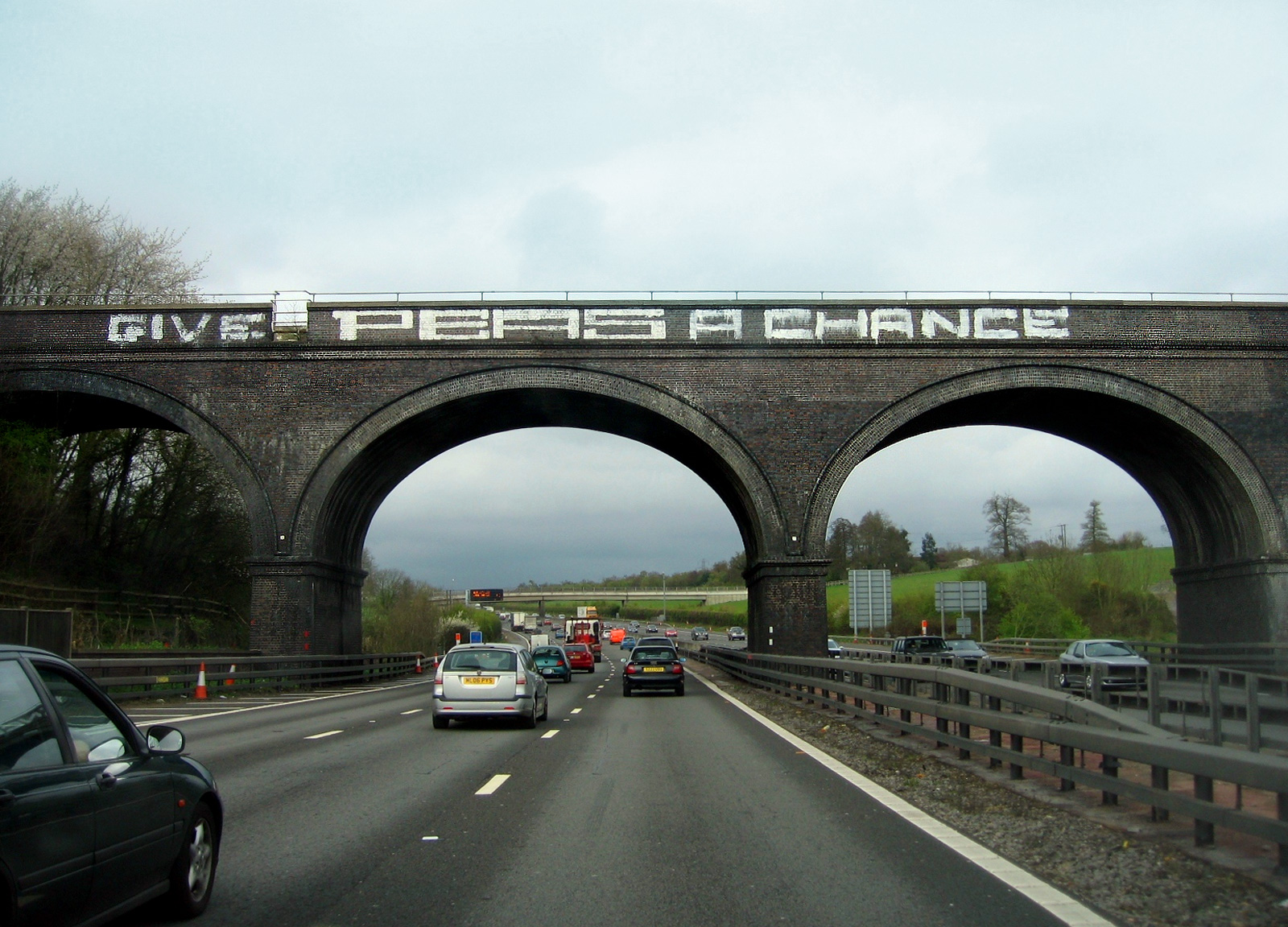
- Chalfont Viaduct seen from the M25 (in 2009)
- Coordinates: 51.58231°N 0.53458°W
- OS grid reference: TQ 01633 88067
- Carries: Chiltern Main Line
- Crosses: M25 Motorway
- Locale: Gerrards Cross
- Official name: Chalfont No. 1 Viaduct
- Other name: Misbourne Viaduct
- Named for: The Chalfonts (Chalfont St Giles, Chalfont St Peter, Little Chalfont)
- Owner: Network Rail

Characteristics
- Design: Arch
- Material: Blue/black engineering brick
- Total length: 104 metres (114 yd)
- Height: 12.5 metres (41 ft)
- No. of spans: 5, each 15.5 metres (51 ft) wide

Rail characteristics
- No. of tracks: 2
- Track gauge: 4 ft 8 1/2 in (1,435 mm) standard gauge

History
- Designer: James Charles Inglis, R.C. Sikes
- Construction start: 1902
- Construction end: 1906

Location
- Interactive map of Chalfont Viaduct

The Chalfont Viaduct (also known as the Misbourne Viaduct) is the first of two five-arch brick railway viaducts on the Chiltern Main Line in south-east England. It is located between Gerrards Cross and Denham Golf Club stations. The M25 motorway passes beneath it between junctions 16 and 17 at Gerrards Cross near Chalfont St Peter, from where the bridge gets its name. The bridge is known as Chalfont No. 1 Viaduct. The longer Chalfont No. 2 Viaduct is a short distance to the west and spans the A413.

The bridge is noted as a local landmark because for ten years it bore a graffiti slogan, "give peas a chance" painted in large white letters on the south-facing parapet. As of March 2024, it bears the slogan "helta▪skelta" (added in 2021).

== Construction ==
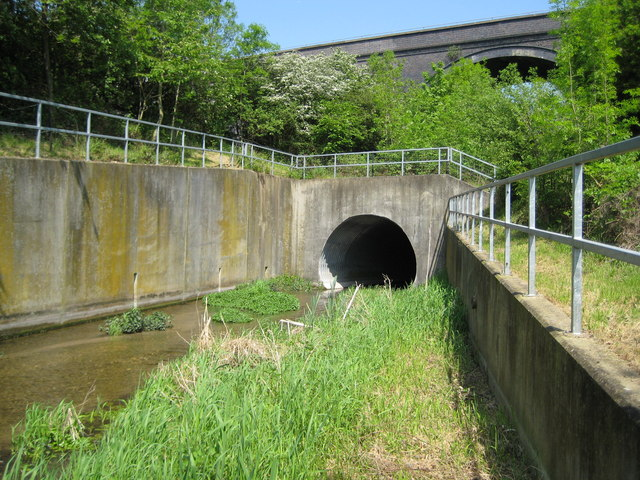
The River Misbourne diverted via culverts under the M25

The Chalfont Viaduct is built of blue and black engineering brick with additional decorative brickwork. The bridge is approximately 12.5 metres (41 ft) high, although it varies in height due to changing ground level, and it has five semi-elliptical arches, each 15.5 metres (51 ft) wide. It was constructed between 1902 and 1906 by the Great Western Railway (GWR) to carry trains on the Great Western and Great Central Joint Railway between London and High Wycombe across the River Misbourne. It was designed by James Charles Inglis, chief civil engineer of the GWR, and assistant engineer Robert Cherry Sikes.

In the mid-1980s the construction of the M25 motorway required the Misbourne to be diverted via underground concrete culverts. The route of the motorway was aligned to pass through the arches of the Chalfont Viaduct, leaving the viaduct largely unaltered apart from the raised ground level and the addition of concrete supports and crash barriers. The viaduct is the only brick-built bridge on this section of the M25.

== Graffiti ==
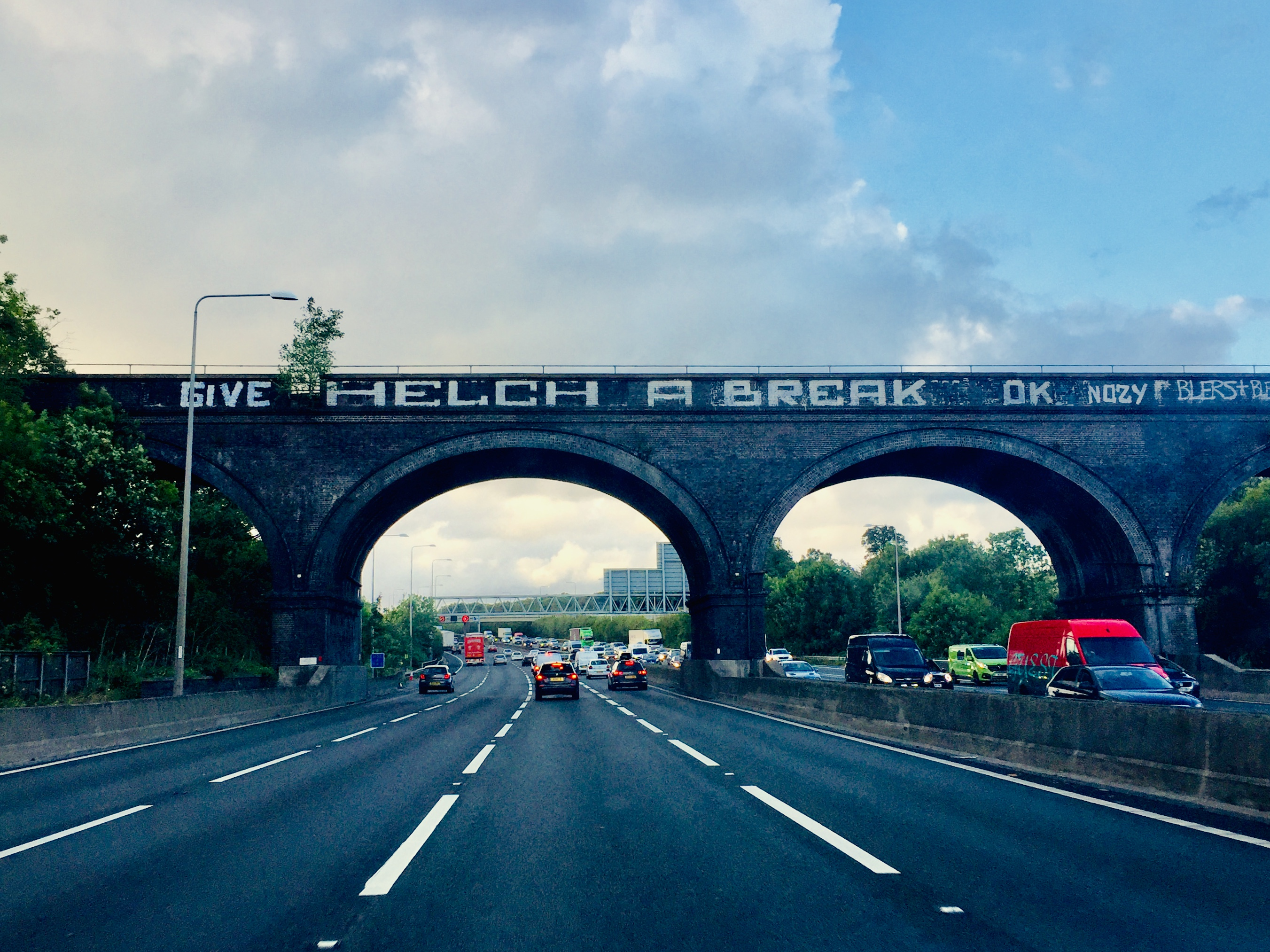
The new "give helch a break!!!" graffiti slogan added in 2018

Between 2008 and 2018, the Chalfont Viaduct bore a graffiti slogan, "give peas a chance" painted in large white letters on the south-facing parapet, visible to M25 drivers heading in a clockwise direction. The north side of the bridge bears the painted legend "peas06".

Originally, the graffiti on the south parapet simply read "peas". It is thought that "Peas" was the tag of a London graffiti artist which can be seen on other locations. Google Streetview images suggest the words "give" and "a chance" were added at some point between June and November 2008; it is unclear whether these were painted by the same person as peas. The altered slogan may refer to the artist being repeatedly arrested, and it may also be a play on words in reference to John Lennon's popular 1969 song, "Give Peace a Chance".

The graffiti became a popular local landmark and was regarded affectionately by some motorists and residents in nearby settlements as a reassuring location marker. In 2018, when the graffiti was partially removed and altered by an unknown artist to read "helch, a chance taken", it prompted mass media commentary which led to the new artist, now known as Helch, returning a few days later to change the slogan to "give helch a break!!!". It has been speculated that the new graffiti may be related to similar slogans being painted on buildings in the London borough of Harrow, and several other bridges along the M25 and M1 motorways all following the similar, heavily serif-ed style/typeface. The reception towards this modification was largely negative, to the point that a petition to Network Rail to reinstate the previous slogan and make the bridge a listed building was produced, and received over 2,000 signatures.

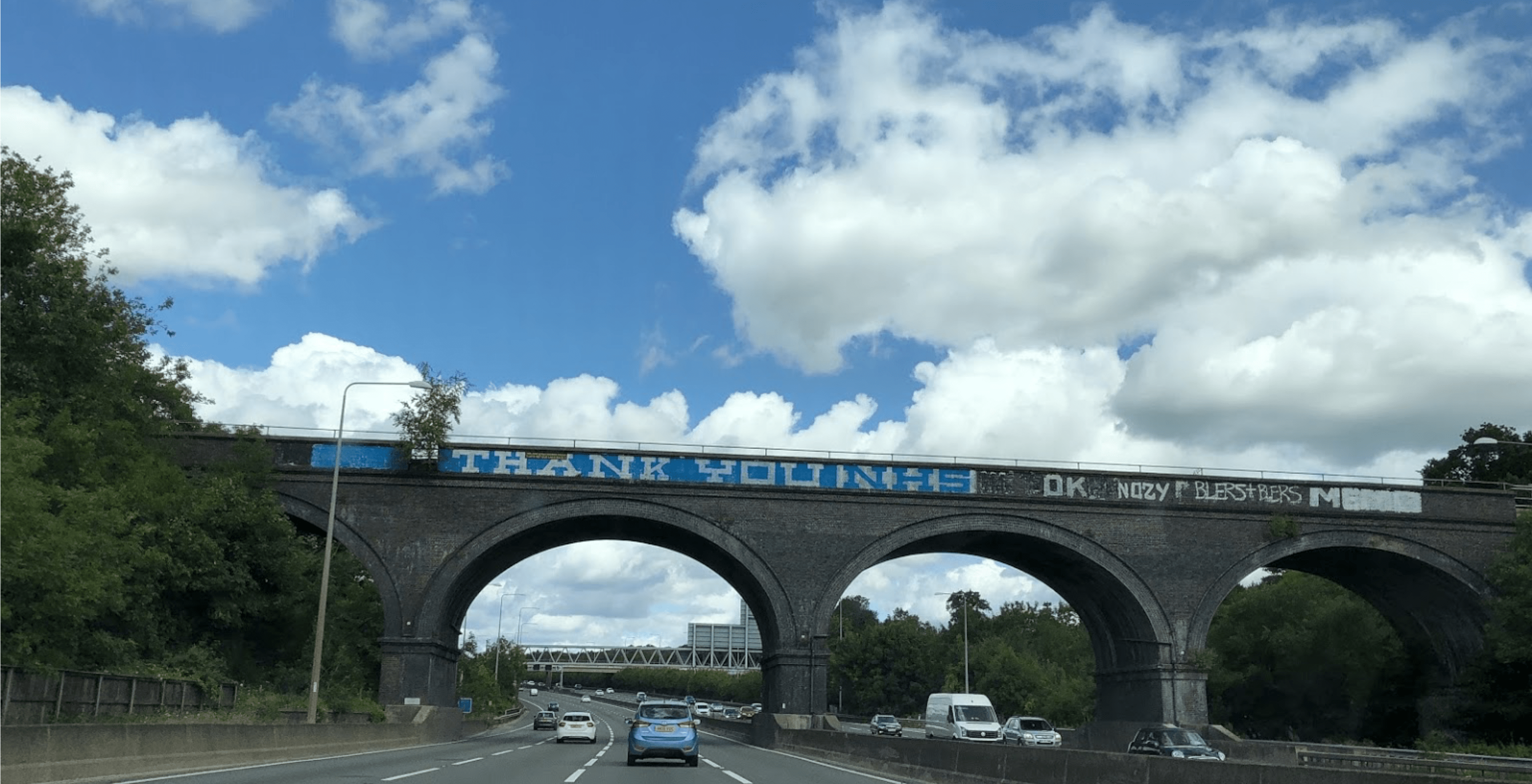
Thank You NHS Graffiti that appeared in March 2020.

In March 2020 during the coronavirus pandemic, an unknown artist replaced the graffiti with one reading "thank you NHS".

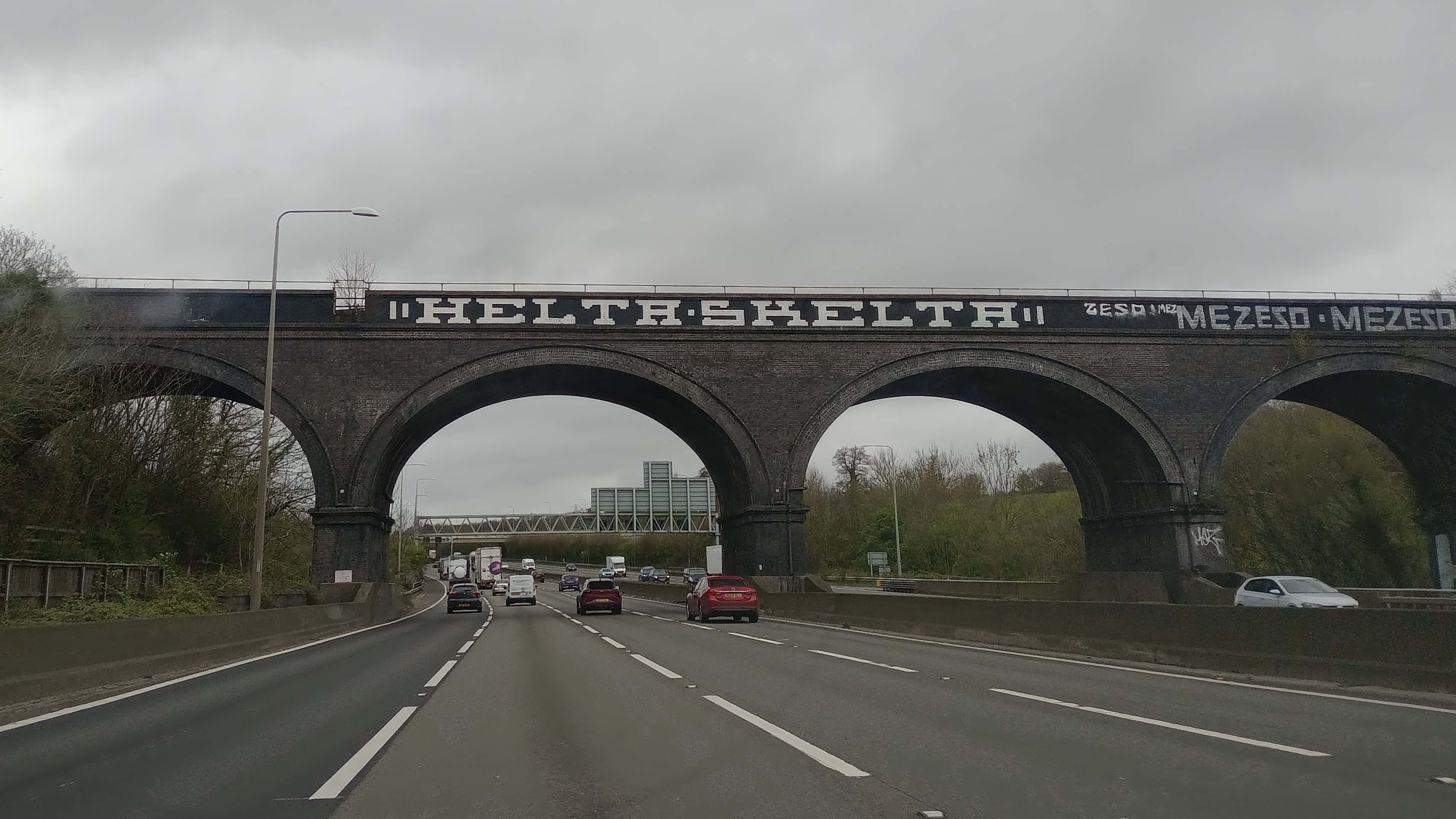
The "helta▪skelta" graffiti slogan, which first appeared in 2021.

At some point between July and November 2021, the graffiti was replaced again with "helta▪skelta". (Note: For possible interpretations, see: Helter Skelter.)

== See also ==
- Be Someone
- Gerrards Cross Tunnel
