= Helch =

British graffiti artist (died 2026)

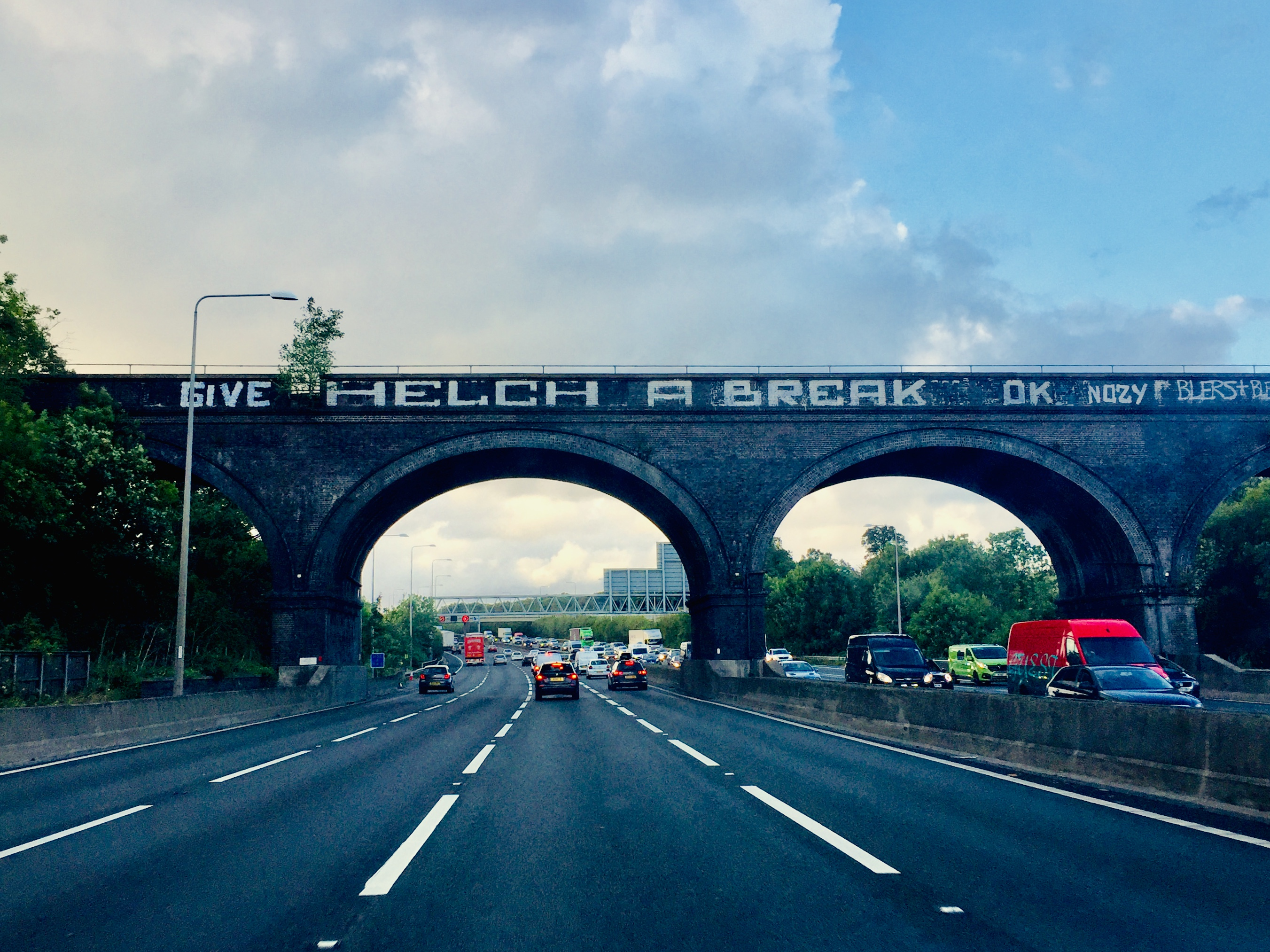
- The give helch a break graffiti over the Chalfont Viaduct
- Born: 1991 or 1992
- Died: August 2026 (aged 34)
- Notable work: give helch a break
- Style: Roller
- Movement: Graffiti
- Website: helchlondon.com

Tag

Helch (1991 or 1992 – August 2026), often stylised as HELCH, was the tag of a pseudonymous graffiti artist, who operated mainly in the United Kingdom, and was known for his stylised capital lettering. Brought up in Hayes, Hillingdon, Helch first came to public prominence in 2018 with his alteration of the "give peas a chance" graffiti on the Chalfont Viaduct over the M25 to "helch: a chance taken" and later "give helch a break". The Helch tag later spread across walls and rooftoops across London, in increasingly stylised forms in a range of colours, either alone, or as a wider set of slogans, or sometimes just as an ornate letter 'H'.

On 29 August 2026, Helch was reported to have died, aged 34. The art gallery he partnered with, BSMT, confirmed his death and paid tribute to him the following day.

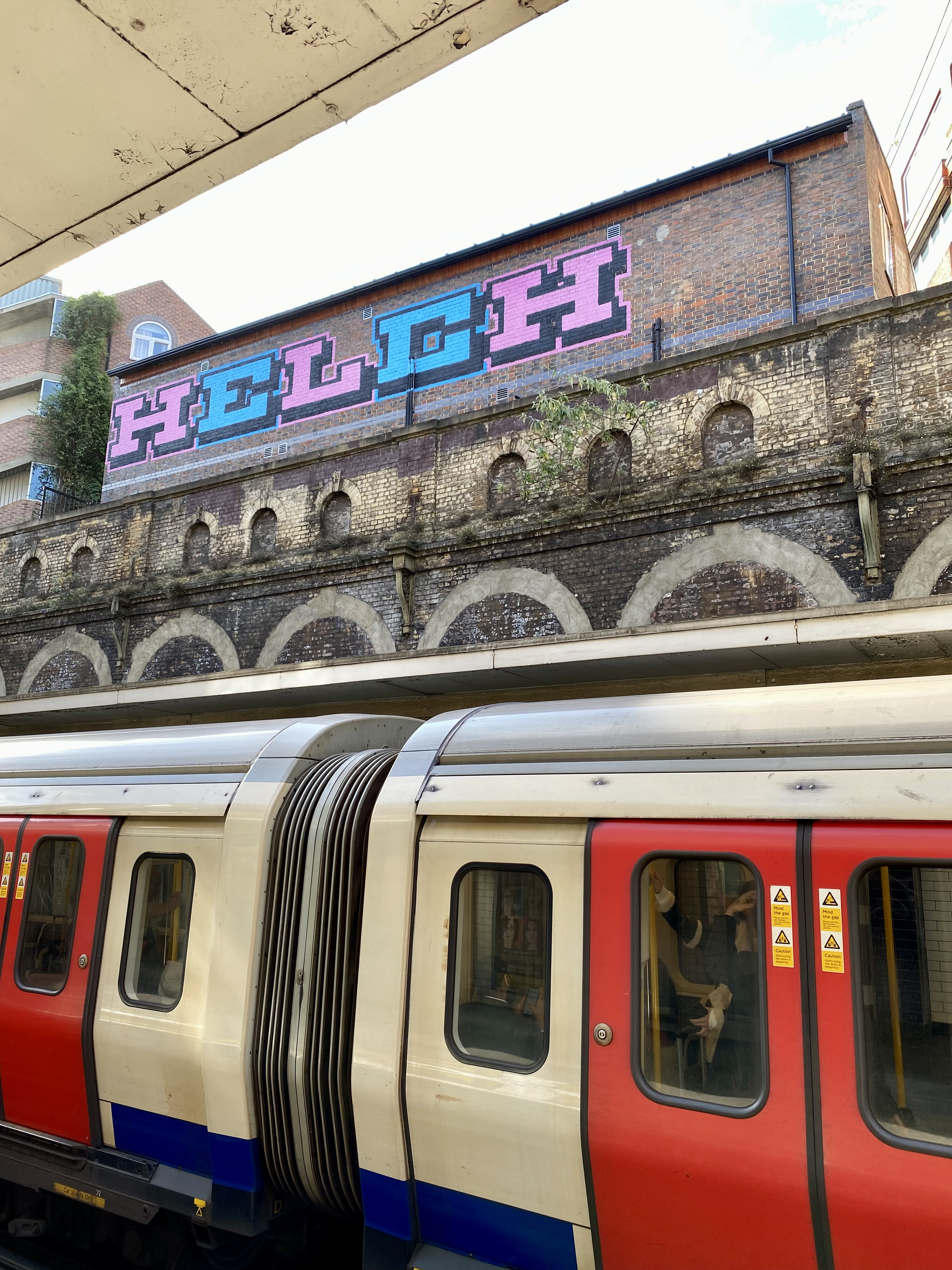
The HELCH tag overlooking Sloane Square station
