= South Mimms services =

M25 and A1(M) motorway services in Hertfordshire, England

South Mimms Services
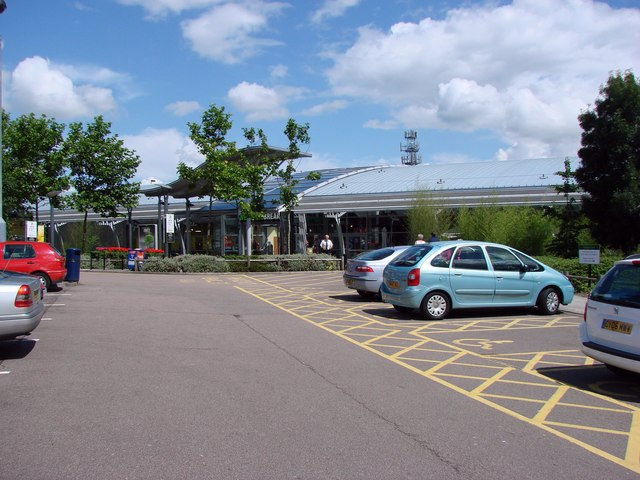

- Location in Hertfordshire, England Location on the UK motorway network

Information
- County: Hertfordshire
- Road: M25 and A1(M)
- Coordinates: 51.6869°N 0.2230°W
- Operator: Welcome Break
- Previous operators: Adam & Tim Co.
- Date opened: 24 May 1987 (fuel in December 1986)
- Website: welcomebreak.co.uk/locations/south-mimms/

South Mimms services is a motorway service area accessible from Junction 23 of the M25 motorway which is also Junction 1 of the A1(M), in England near South Mimms, Hertfordshire. Constructed in 1986 as the first service area on the M25, it is operated by Welcome Break. It is built on the site of Bignell's Corner, named after a garden centre, Bignell and Cutbush, which was close to the junction of the old A6, and A1. At the junction there was also a pub, the Middlesex Arms, and an Esso Motor hotel, near which developed a notorious truck stop and the Beacon Cafe.

== History ==
On Monday 30 July 1984, the four sites on the M25 were unveiled, including one at Iver, still to be built.

The design announced at the end of March 1986, developed with BP Oil and Welcome Break. Welcome Break was bought by Forte in July 1986. Fuel opened in December 1986. BP claimed that it was the largest petrol forecourt in Europe.

When constructed in December 1986, it was the first service area directly accessible from the M25.

The 35-acre (14-hectare) service area opened on 24 May 1987.. It cost £7 million, and had conference facilities. There were 27 fuel pumps, for 700 cars, 35 coaches. It had 250 staff. Margaret Thatcher and her husband officially opened the site on 6 June 1987.

In late May 1988, at the site, the new Welcome Break livery was unveiled.

The building was destroyed in August 1998 following a fire started in a deep fryer with no fire suppression system; an incident which has been subsequently studied.

== Crime ==
An unusual heist of 2,900 dresses all of the same design occurred in the lorry park at the service area on the morning of 13 August 2013. The loot was valued at £17,000.

== Customers ==
The 2019 Motorway Services User Survey found that South Mimms was in the top five motorway services in the UK for customer satisfaction.

Next anticlockwise: Cobham services	Motorway service stations on the M25 motorway	Next clockwise: Thurrock services
