= Bell Common =

Hamlet in Essex, England

Coordinates: 51.692°N 0.099°E

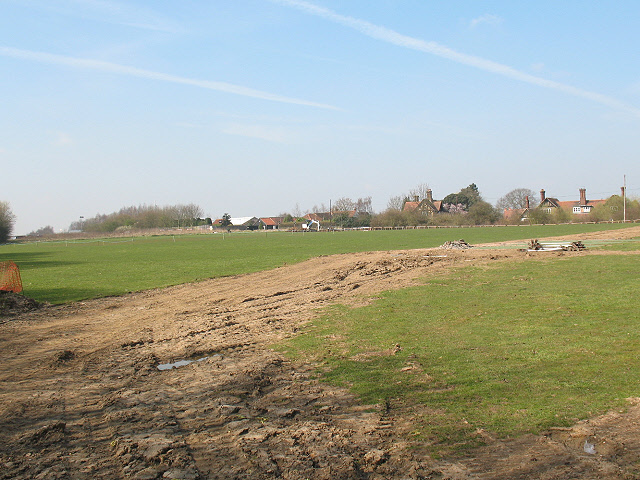
- Bell Common Cricket Ground

- Location within Essex
- OS grid reference: TL4401
- Shire county: Essex
- Region: East
- Country: England
- Sovereign state: United Kingdom
- Police: Essex
- Fire: Essex
- Ambulance: East of England

Bell Common is a hamlet in the Epping Forest District of Essex, England. It lies south of the town of Epping and north of the Ambresbury Banks archaeological site.

Its former name, Beacon Common, is attributed to a story about an ancient beacon erected at Bell Common by locals to alert them in the event of invasion.

Owing to the Epping Forest Act 1878, its green space is retained undeveloped.

The settlement has a number of listed buildings, including The Black Cottage and 115–117 Bell Common.

== Tunnel ==
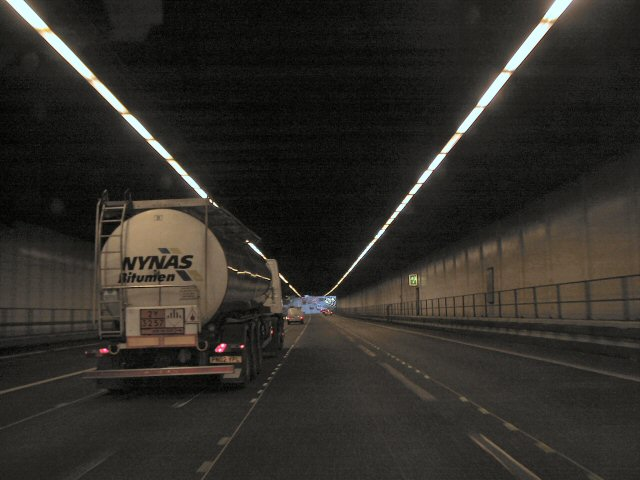
Inside the Bell Common Tunnel

The Bell Common Tunnel is a covered section of the M25 motorway in Bell Common. The tunnel was constructed between 1982 and 1984 using the cut-and-cover method. The tunnel is 470 metres long. It lies between junctions 26 and 27 on the M25.

The construction of the roadway was protested by campaigns against the M25, including by members of the West Essex Ramblers' Association and the Upshire Village Preservation Society. The public inquiry which followed was, per the Epping Forest Guardian, "at that time, the longest public inquiry in road planning history". Whilst the tunnel was under construction, the local cricket club was forced to temporarily relocate. The grounds and club were later reinstated.

The tunnel began a £90.4m Highways Agency refurbishment in 2008 to replace various equipment and the ventilation system. It was reopened in March 2010.

A report for the California Department of Transportation by the Western Transportation Institute describes the Bell Common Tunnel as "designed to enable animal movements above a major Highway". A report for Solihull Metropolitan Borough Council also says that the covered tunnel "assisted in mitigating the community, landscape and ecological severance caused by running the M25 through Epping Forest".
