= George Dobry =

Polish-British barrister and judge

George Leon Severyn Dobry CBE QC (1 November 1918 – 14 March 2018) was a Polish-British barrister and judge.

Dobry was born and raised in Warsaw. He was educated in Edinburgh and at Corpus Christi College, Oxford. He took silk in 1969 and was appointed a CBE in 1977.

He married Margaret Headley Smith (1925-1978) in 1948 and had two daughters, Anthea and Josephine.
