= Titsey Woods =

Nature reserve in Surrey, England

Coordinates: 51.269°N 0.034°W

- Site of Special Scientific Interest
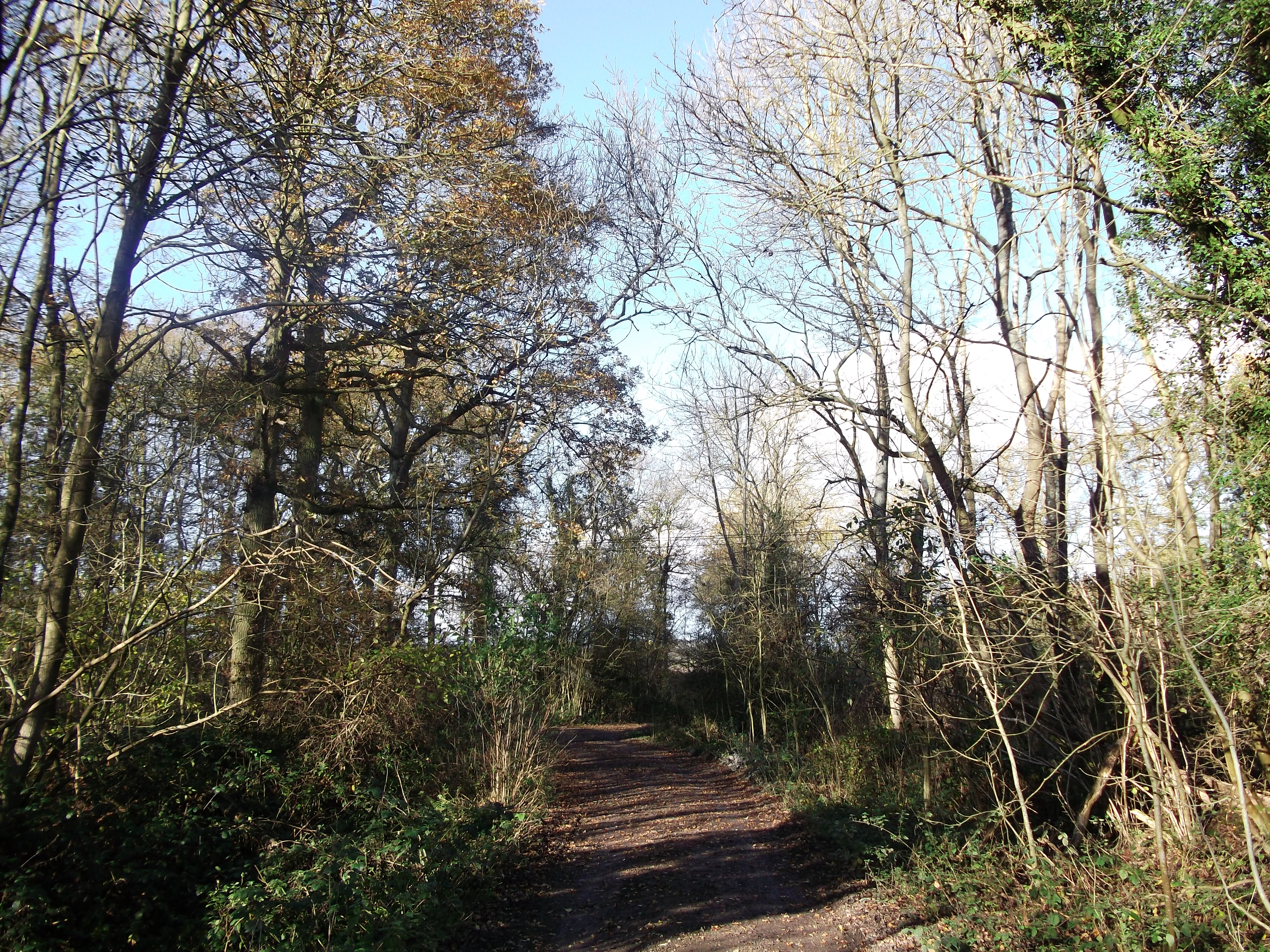
- Location of Titsey Woods.
- Area of search: Surrey
- Grid reference: TQ 420 542
- Interest: Biological
- Area: 45.3 hectares (112 acres)
- Notification date: 1987
- Location map: Magic Map

Titsey Woods is a 45.3-hectare (112-acre) biological Site of Special Scientific Interest north-west of Oxted in Surrey.

This site is composed of wet semi-natural woods on Gault Clay with diverse ground flora. There are a number of uncommon Lepidoptera, including the silver-washed fritillary and white-letter hairstreak butterflies and rose-marbled and alder kitten moths.
