= Thurrock services =

M25 motorway services in Essex, UK

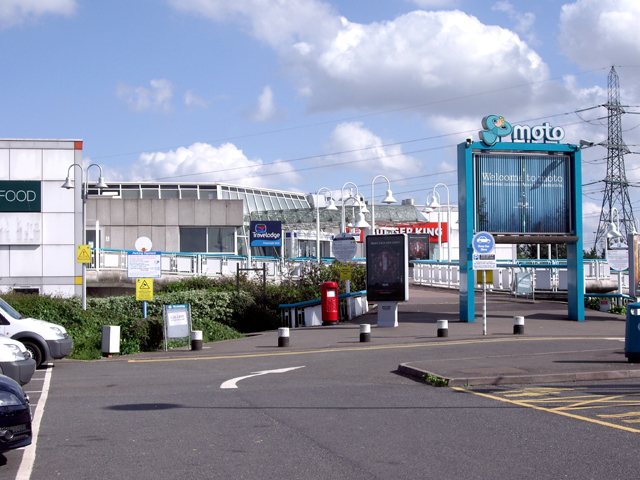

- Location within Essex

Information
- County: Essex
- Road: M25, A282
- Coordinates: 51°29′32″N 0°16′20″E
- Operator: Moto Hospitality
- Date opened: 1990
- Website: moto-way.com/services/thurrock/

Thurrock services is a motorway service station in Thurrock, Essex, serving the M25 motorway, and the Dartford Crossing (A282). It was planned in the mid-1980s and opened after the M25 was completed. Originally popular, the services have gradually deteriorated and have attracted criticism for poor facilities. They have also been a magnet for drug trafficking and other criminal activities.

== Location ==
The service area, owned by Moto, is accessible from junction 30 and 31 of the M25 motorway. Amenities include an Ibis Budget hotel(formerly Travelodge). The main entrance leads onto a first floor concourse containing shops and food services. The toilets are located on the ground floor.

Part of the service station overlooks a lake, which was constructed from a former gravel pit.

== History ==
The site was offered for sale by the landowner to Granada (now Moto Hospitality), and at the time contained heavy industry and included several pylons, gasometers and industrial sheds. The land had been used for landfill waste, leading to concerns about a build up of methane underneath any development. The sale did not go ahead, but in 1986 the Department of Transport announced that bids would be considered for a 40-acre (16 ha) site next to M25 junction 31.

Granada announced the following year they intended to build the services, but Esso won the construction contract. Work began in 1988, but was delayed by an objection to the building design from the local planning authority. The services opened in 1990.

== Criticism ==
The services were popular when opened, and did not attract attention, but gradually deteriorated and were criticised. In 2018, a Transport Focus survey of 9,600 motorway service users ranked Thurrock as the worst service area in England, with only 68% reporting a satisfactory experience. Problems included a lack of working toilet facilities, queues for showers, no air conditioning and food not kept properly refrigerated. Thurrock was found to be the most improved motorway service area in the 2019 edition of the survey.

== Crime ==
The services have been used as an exchange point for illegal drug dealing. A representative from HM Customs and Excise said its location next to a major motorway providing access to cross-channel ports and the rest of the UK made it an ideal meeting point for traffickers.

In 1998, 40 kilograms (88 lb) of heroin was recovered from a van trying to breach a police cordon at the premises. In 2001, heroin valued at £8m was seized following an armed police operation. Two years later, a five-man trafficking team was captured on closed-circuit television; they were subsequently arrested and imprisoned for attempting to distribute £2.6m worth of cocaine. In 2010, a sting operation resulted in several arrests for theft, possession of drugs, carrying offensive weapons and driving without tax and insurance and 32 vehicles were impounded.

Next anticlockwise: South Mimms services	Motorway service stations on the M25 motorway	Next clockwise: Clacket Lane services
