= Be Someone (graffiti) =

Street art in Houston, Texas

- Footage of the artwork captured using a DJI Mavic, 2022
- Year: c. 2013
- Medium: Paint
- Movement: Graffiti
- Location: Houston
- Website: BESOMEONE on Instagram

Be Someone is a reoccurring piece of graffiti above Interstate 45 in Houston, Texas. It has become a well known landmark in Houston due to its prominent location to commuters.

== History ==
The piece's date of origin is unverifiable. It is situated on a Union Pacific bridge which crosses above Interstate 45 just north of downtown Houston. It has been vandalized and repainted several times. In 2018, it was changed to "Be Mattress Mac." In 2019, it was altered to say "Be Sus." During the COVID-19 pandemic, the words "Wash your hands" were painted over the slogan. In June 2020, the name "George Floyd" was painted over it. In February 2022, it was painted over with “No War Know Peace” in response to the 2022 Russian invasion of Ukraine.

On May 29, 2021, the BeSomeone Instagram account posted that they would no longer restore the graffiti after it had been defaced.

== Cultural impact ==
The slogan had become common on local merchandise. Rapper Paul Wall has a tattoo in reference to the work. There have been multiple attempts to make the graffiti a protected landmark.

== See also ==
- Give Peas a Chance
