= St Mary's Church, Portbury =

Church in Somerset, England

St Mary's Church
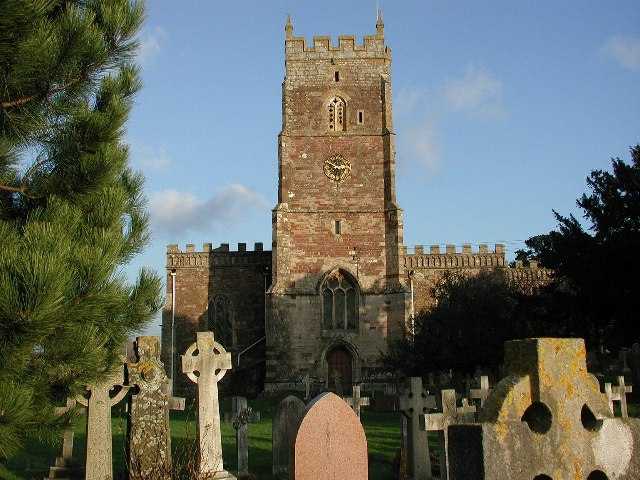

- Location within Somerset

General information
- Location: Portbury, England
- Coordinates: 51.4756°N 2.7173°W
- Completed: 12th century

St Mary's Church in Portbury, Somerset, England, is an Anglican parish church close to the M5 motorway. It is a Grade I listed building.

It dates from the 12th century, with alteration and extension in the 13th and restoration between 1870 and 1875. It has a Norman doorway and a grand fifteenth-century porch. There is a Berkeley Chantry chapel with early Berkeley family burials dating from around 1190.

There are a number of elderly yew trees in the surrounding graveyard with one reputed to be 900 years old. The Church was extensively renovated in the 19th century, when a cast-iron heating system was installed.

The parish is part of the benefice of Pill, Portbury and Easton in Gordano within the Portishead deanery.

The tower houses six bells hung in the English style of change ringing, the heaviest being the tenor at 21cwt or in modern terms 1 ton. In 2012 work was carried out in the tower to reinstate the floor between the ringers and the bells. Like most bells in the area, they were locally cast by local founders. Many of the bells in this tower were made by the Bilbie family of Chew Stoke.

In 2013 the church was added to the Heritage at Risk Register because of water damage to the plaster ceiling.

== See also ==
- Grade I listed buildings in North Somerset
- List of Somerset towers
- List of ecclesiastical parishes in the Diocese of Bath and Wells
