= Catterick services =

Proposed motorway services in Yorkshire, England

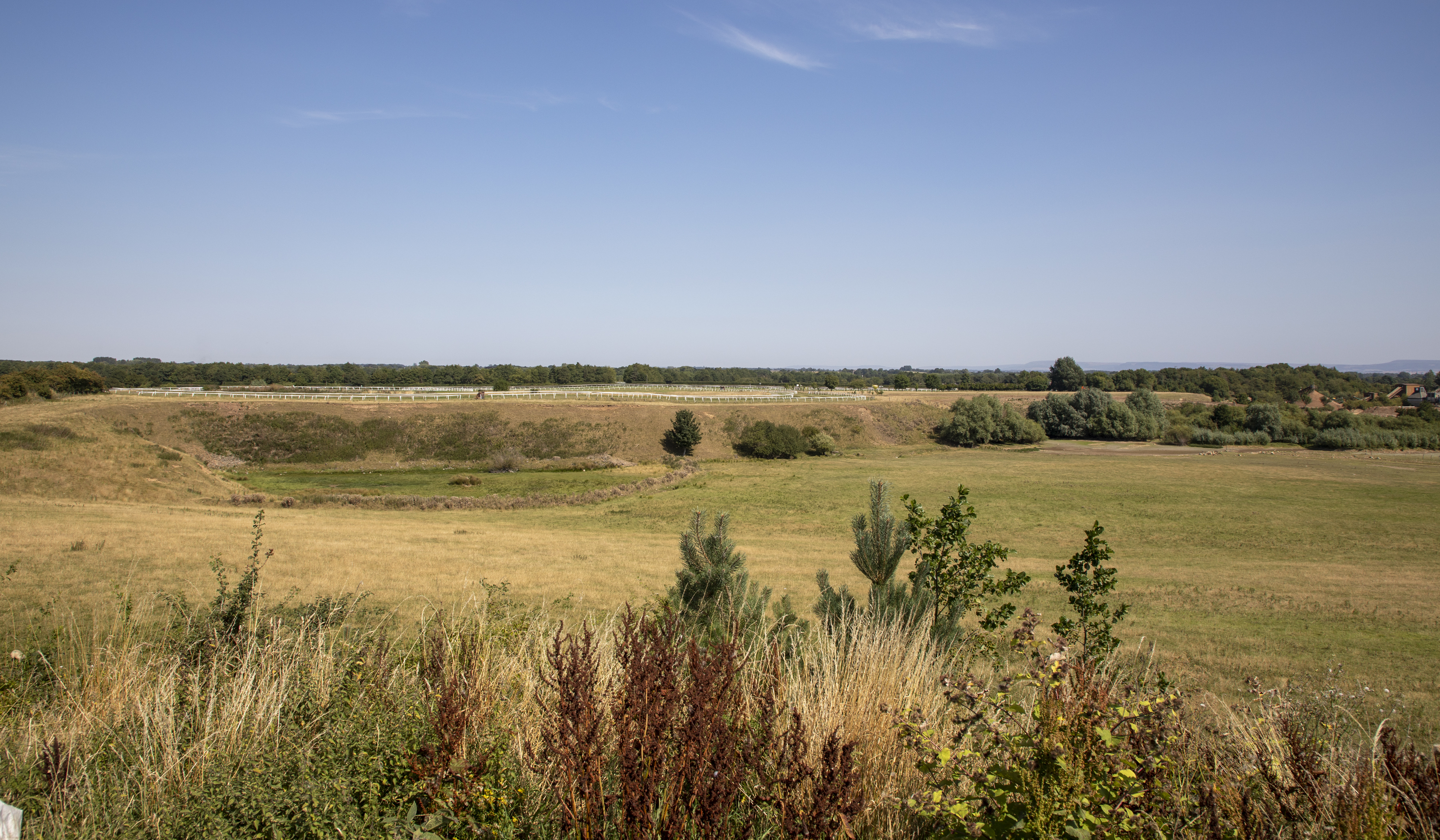
- Catterick MSA location; this is looking east from the roundabout on the A1(M)/A6055 road

Information
- County: North Yorkshire
- Road: A1(M); A6055
- Coordinates: 54.380°N 1.647°W
- Facilities: See text
- Operator: Roadchef (proposed)

Northbound services
- Facilities: Scotch Corner MRA
- Operator: Moto

Southbound services
- Facilities: Coneygarth MRA
- Operator: Exelby Services

Catterick services is a proposed motorway service area (MSA) near to Catterick village in North Yorkshire, England. The services were first proposed in 2019, receiving planning permission in 2022, and a revised permission in December 2024 due to a legal issue with the previous approval of 2022. The services have been objected to and criticised due to the location of the site as it will affect wildlife in the area. It was also objected to on the grounds of other nearby services along the stretch of the A1(M) in North Yorkshire, however, government designations state that Leeming Bar, Coneygarth, Scotch Corner and Barton Park services are all motorway rest areas (MRAs), not being of sufficient standard to be motorway service areas (MSAs).

However, in 2026, the decision to award planning permission was quashed at the High Court in Leeds. Roadchef state that they will amend and re-submit the application.

== History ==
In the 2010s, the UK Government put in place regulations to make sure that services on motorways and trunk roads, should be no more than either 28 miles (45 km) apart, or 30 minutes driving time, whichever is the lesser. Since the A1 was upgraded in stages between Wetherby and the Barton Interchange during the 21st century, there have been several applications to provide motorway service areas at points along the route of the motorway between Wetherby MSA, and the next official MSA at Durham, with the distance between the two being 60.8 miles (97.8 km). The services at Leeming Bar, Coneygarth and Scotch Corner are designated as motorway rest areas (MRA), and so cannot be considered when planning the agreed spacing of MSAs every 28 miles.

Catterick MSA was given planning permission by Richmondshire District Council in 2022, but the proposal was brought back in front of North Yorkshire Council because of a "legal issue". (Note: When the proposal was first considered (2022), the authority with the final decision was Richmondshire District Council. In April 2023, the seven councils in North Yorkshire were superseded by one unitary authority, North Yorkshire Council.) The issue was a condition in the 2022 permission order that the applicants, Roadchef, would mitigate the wildlife habitat loss by funding a project elsewhere at a cost of £2 million, and offset the environmental impact. Councillors stated that this clause had not been fulfilled, so the application had been referred back to the council for an updated decision. Despite some councillors having reservations about the scheme, it was approved. Objections had been raised about the impact on wildlife at the intended site as it "..would destroy a nature conservation site used by migratory birds on the red list of threatened species, such as curlews and lapwings." Objections were also raised on the validity of the project given that plans to enhance the services at Barton Park were submitted some weeks earlier. National Highways have publicly stated support for both schemes citing the need for more services when the A66 is upgraded, although the leader of North Yorkshire Council was quoted as saying that he approved the Barton Park scheme to avoid "...the bizarre situation of more signed services on 10 miles of A1 than the whole of the M25." The site, which is known as Pallet Hill Farm, is a former quarry which covers 27 acres (11 ha).

Moto objected to the services being built stating that they have planning permission to upgrade their Barton rest area to a full motorway service station. This appeal was granted at the High Court in 2026, and Roadchef have stated tat they will amend their application and resubmit it to the council for approval.

Motorway Rest and Services areas between Wetherby and Durham on the A1(M) (northwards)
Location	Distance from Wetherby MSA (Note: Where possible, this is determined from the centre of the car park at Wetherby MSA, to the centre of the named services in the list. Whilst Leeming Bar Services are 28.8 miles from Wetherby, further than Coneygarth Services, the distance from the junction on the motorway to Leeming Bar MRA is further.)	Operator	Notes	Ref
Wetherby	0	Moto	Opened in 2008	
Vale of York	12 miles (19 km)	Welcome Break	Approved in April 2021	
Ripon	18 miles (29 km)	Moto	Proposed by Moto to cover an area of 33 acres (13 ha) at Junction 50 on the A1(M).	
Leeming Bar	28.8 miles (46.3 km)	Moto	The report by the Planning Inspectorate in 2021 stated that the services at Leeming Bar had "...limited poor quality facilities..requires substantial investment and therefore cannot be considered an MSA."	
Coneygarth Truck Stop	28.6 miles (46 km)	Exelby		
Catterick MSA	33 miles (53 km)	Roadchef	Planning permission was granted in July 2022. After a legal issue, this was returned to the council for approval and given further permission in December 2024. Permission was quashed by the High Court in 2026.	
Scotch Corner	38.8 miles (62.4 km)	Moto		
Barton Park	40 miles (64 km)	Moto	Advertised as Barton Park Truck Stop, but plans have been submitted for the site to be upgraded	
Durham MSA	60.8 miles (97.8 km)	Roadchef		

Indicates that the site is an MSA that is operating
Indicates that the site has been given planning permission
Indicates that the site is not an MSA
Indicates that the site has been denied planning permission
Indicates that the site was granted planning permission, but this has been quashed by the High Court

== Facilities ==
The site is planned to have HGV overnight parking, a fuelling station, two drive-thru cafes and electric vehicle charging points. The site is also expected to host a 100-bed hotel and the shops and eateries for short-stops in the service area. The Roadchef application details employment for around 300 staff and an amenity area, including dog-walking facilities and a lake.
