= A369 road =

Road in England

A369

Route information
- Length: 6.7 mi (10.8 km)

Major junctions
- East end: Bristol
- M5 A370 A3029
- West end: Portishead

Location
- Country: United Kingdom

Road network
- Roads in the United Kingdom; Motorways; A and B road zones

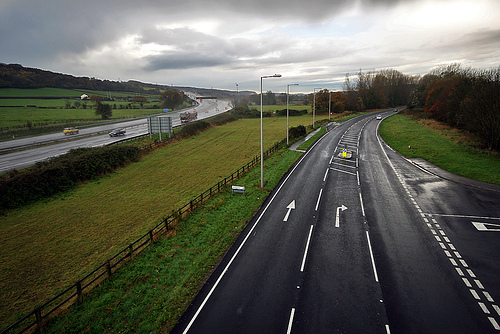
The A369 road and M5 motorway near Easton in Gordano, Bristol

The A369 is an A road running from Ashton Gate junction with the A370 and the A3029 to Portishead in South West England. The first part is relatively flat and the route passes through several villages which are Leigh Woods, Abbots Leigh, Easton in Gordano to Portishead. The road crosses the M5 motorway at Junction 19 which is where the single complex Gordano services are located.

During the rush hour period the road gets extremely busy since it is the main commuter route from Portishead to Bristol. There is much congestion on the A369 which is why one of the primary reasons for reopening the Portishead Branch Line.

== History ==
In 1922, the A369 was originally connected from Ashcott to Marksbury. By 1935 however, the road and became part of the A39, eventually the roads number became unused for many decades.

By the 1950s, it was thought that Portishead was a connection to the A-road but it was connected to the B3124 and eventually it became part of the A369. The road crossed over the Clifton Suspension Bridge where soon after however, it was re-routed over the B3126 and connected to the A370.

In the early 1970s, the M5 was completed from the Avonmouth Bridge and went southwards, the western half of the route became part of the Gordano Interchange. Eventually a new route was completed from the village of Portbury into Portishead, and the old road through Sheepway was separated by the M5 motorway so a new road called Wyndham Way was constructed to allow faster access to the Town Centre, Bristol Docks and Power Station.

== Points of interest ==
Point	Coordinates (Links to map resources)	OS Grid Ref	Notes
Bristol	51.4413°N 2.6260°W	ST565715	Bristol
Portishead, Somerset	51.4886°N 2.7642°W	ST470769	Portishead, Somerset
