= Easton in Gordano =

Village in Somerset, England

Coordinates: 51.476°N 2.700°W

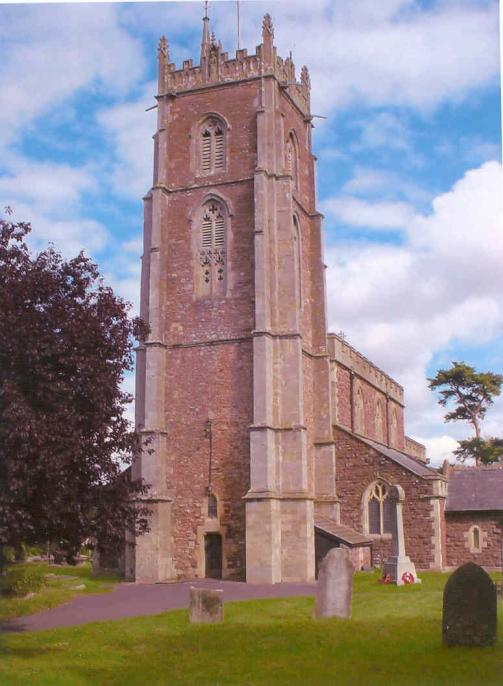
- St. George's Church

- Location within Somerset
- Population: 4,828
- OS grid reference: ST515755
- Civil parish: Pill and Easton-in-Gordano
- Unitary authority: North Somerset
- Ceremonial county: Somerset
- Region: South West
- Country: England
- Sovereign state: United Kingdom
- Post town: BRISTOL
- Postcode district: BS20 0XX
- Dialling code: 01275
- Police: Avon and Somerset
- Fire: Avon
- Ambulance: South Western
- UK Parliament: North Somerset
- Website: pillandeastoningordano.org

Easton in Gordano (/ɡɔːrˈdeɪnoʊ/) is a village in Somerset, England, about 4 1/2 miles (7 km) northwest of Bristol city centre. It is part of the civil parish of Pill and Easton-in-Gordano and within the unitary authority of North Somerset. In 2011 the population of the parish was 4,828.

The village is close to junction 19 of the M5 motorway, making it popular with commuters working in the Bristol area. Most facilities are in the nearby larger village of Pill, or the town of Portishead which lies some 3 miles (5 km) to the west.

== History ==
A settlement of 24 households was recorded in the Domesday Book of 1086; for many centuries it was also known as St George. The name Gordano comes from Old English and is descriptive of the triangular shape of the whole valley from Clevedon to Portishead, being the ablative singular of the Latinised form of Gorden meaning muddy valley.

Easton in Gordano was an ancient parish in the Portbury Hundred. The parish also included the village of Pill. It became a civil parish in 1866.

After the Second World War a large housing development grew up in the Lodway area, northwest of Pill village. Construction of the M5 motorway included the nearby Gordano service area.

== Governance ==
Sign at parish boundary

The civil parish of Easton in Gordano was renamed Pill and Easton-in-Gordano in 2011, reflecting the larger size and population of Pill. Pill and Easton-in-Gordano parish council has responsibility for local issues, including setting an annual precept (local rate) to cover the council's operating costs and producing annual accounts for public scrutiny. The parish council evaluates local planning applications and works with the local police, district council officers, and neighbourhood watch groups on matters of crime, security, and traffic. The parish council's role also includes initiating projects for the maintenance and repair of parish facilities, such as the village hall or community centre, playing fields and playgrounds, as well as consulting with the district council on the maintenance, repair, and improvement of highways, drainage, footpaths, public transport, and street cleaning. Conservation matters (including trees and listed buildings) and environmental issues are also of interest to the council.

The parish falls within the unitary authority of North Somerset which was created in 1996, as established by the Local Government Act 1992. It provides a single tier of local government with responsibility for almost all local government functions within its area including local planning and building control, local roads, council housing, environmental health, markets and fairs, refuse collection, recycling, cemeteries, crematoria, leisure services, parks, and tourism. It is also responsible for education, social services, libraries, main roads, public transport, trading standards, waste disposal and strategic planning, although fire, police and ambulance services are provided jointly with other authorities through the Avon Fire and Rescue Service, Avon and Somerset Constabulary and the South Western Ambulance Service.

North Somerset's area covers part of the ceremonial county of Somerset but it is administered independently of the non-metropolitan county. Its administrative headquarters is in the town hall in Weston-super-Mare. Between 1 April 1974 and 1 April 1996, it was the Woodspring district of the county of Avon. Before 1974 that the parish was part of the Long Ashton Rural District.

An electoral ward exists with the same name. The ward stretches from the Royal Portbury Dock through Easton-in-Gordano to Long Ashton. The total population of the ward taken at the 2011 census was 2,655.

The parish is represented in the House of Commons of the Parliament of the United Kingdom as part of the North Somerset constituency. It elects one Member of Parliament (MP) by the first past the post system of election, currently Sadik Al-Hassan of the Labour Party. It was also part of the South West England constituency of the European Parliament, prior to Britain leaving the European Union in January 2020, which elected seven MEPs using the d'Hondt method of party-list proportional representation.

== Geography ==
Easton in Gordano is at the north-eastern end of the Gordano Valley, on the south bank of the Avon, opposite Shirehampton, adjacent to the village of Pill. It commands an extensive view over the Bristol Channel; South Wales and Royal Portbury Dock are also clearly visible. Part of the dock is within the parish.

St George's Flower Bank is a 1.48 hectares (3.7 acres) local nature reserve alongside a main road.

== Landmarks ==
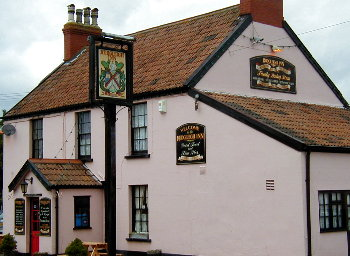
Rudgeleigh Inn

There are two pubs – the Kings Arms and the Rudgleigh Inn. The Rudgleigh Inn is on the main A369 Portishead to Bristol Road, and the Kings Arms is in the village, on St. Georges Hill. The latter is home to three local skittles teams who use a skittle alley in an annex to the pub.

== Religious sites ==
The village Church of St George was rebuilt, with the exception of the tower, in 1872. The registers date from 1559. The date of the first Church on this site is unknown, but records exist dating back to 1239. It has been designated by English Heritage as a Grade II* listed building.

== Sport ==
There is a local cricket club, and a football club called "St. George Easton in Gordano AFC" which was founded in 1917. Easton-in-Gordano is also home to a judo club, Tora Judo Kai, which meets in the St John Ambulance Hall.

== Doctors ==
There is a doctors' surgery on the Pill/Easton in Gordano Boundary at Lodway Close.

== Transport ==
Easton in Gordano is well served by roads, given the nearby M5 and the A369 which links to Bristol and Portishead. There is a service station on the M5 named after the village. A bus route from Portishead to Bristol City Centre runs through the village.

== Culture ==
The local Clevedon Mercury and Portishead Times newspapers are delivered to residents free of charge, usually by Saturday morning.

The village is celebrated in the song of the same name by The Wurzels.

== Notable residents ==
Easton in Gordano is the birthplace of the explorer Bertram Thomas (1892–1950).
