= Church of St George, Easton in Gordano =

Church in Somerset, England

Church of St George
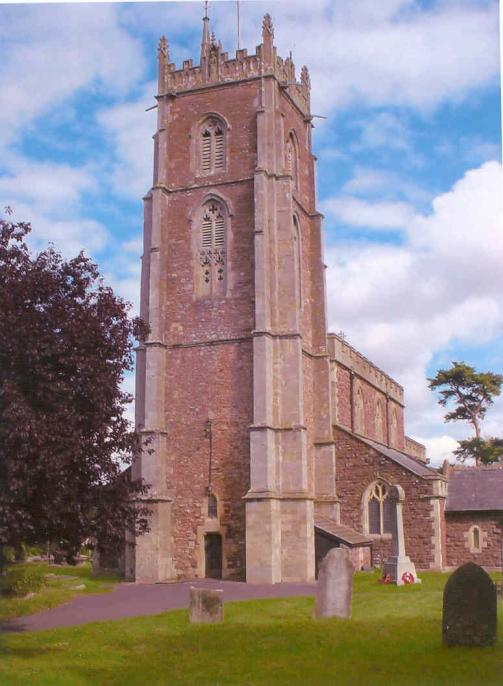

- Location within Somerset
- 51.4786°N 2.7008°W
- Location: Easton in Gordano, Somerset, England

History
- Built: 14th and 15th century

Listed Building – Grade II*
- Official name: Church of St George
- Designated: 11 October 1961
- Reference no.: 1129826

The Anglican Church of St George in Easton in Gordano in the English county of Somerset is a Grade II* listed building.

== History ==
The church is dedicated to St. George.

The date of the first Church on this site is unknown, but records exist dating back to 1239. It is known that a church stood on the current site since 1230, but was rebuilt in the 14th and 15th centuries. The registers date from 1559.

The church was rebuilt, with the exception of the tower, in 1872 by Ewan Christian. Conservation work was carried out on the tower in 2011. In 2015 a grant was received to help towards the cost of the repair of the church roof.

The parish is part of the benefice of Pill, Portbury and Easton in Gordano within the Diocese of Bath and Wells.

== Architecture ==
The church has north and south aisles, a nave with clerestory, vestry and chancel. The 14th century three-stage west tower is supported by set-back buttresses.

== See also ==
- List of ecclesiastical parishes in the Diocese of Bath and Wells
