= Vale of York services =

Future motorway service area in England

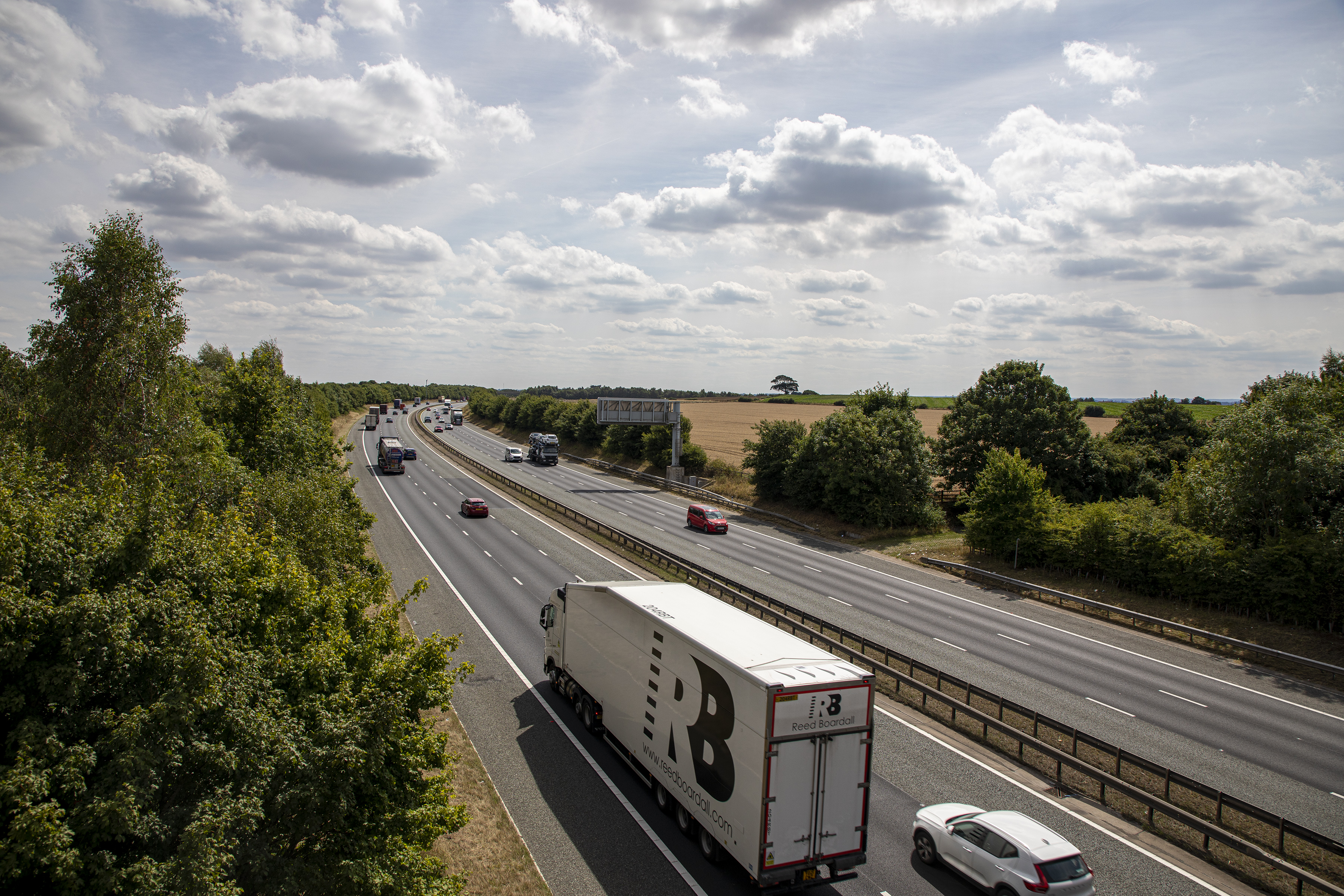
- Kirby Hill MSA area – the field beyond the motorway

- Location within North Yorkshire

Information
- County: North Yorkshire
- Road: A1(M)
- Coordinates: 54.117°N 1.415°W
- Operator: Welcome Break

The Vale of York services (also known as Kirby Hill services) is a proposed motorway service area (MSA) on the A1(M) at Kirby Hill in North Yorkshire, England. The MSA site is located on the western side of the motorway between Junctions 48 and 49 near to the village of Kirby Hill, with access to both the northbound and southbound carriageways. Planning applications were submitted multiple times between 1996 and 2021 and were refused by Harrogate Borough Council and at Appeal for 25 years.

== History ==
The proposed services at Kirby Hill have had a protracted approval process, being refused for 25 years until outline permission was finally granted after a fourth Public Inquiry, held virtually during the COVID-19 pandemic, in 2021. The section of road between Ferrybridge and Scotch Corner/Barton interchange was upgraded to motorway status gradually between 1999 and 2018. The existing service areas at Leeming Bar and at Scotch Corner were designated as Motorway Rest Areas (MRA), not having the requisite facilities needed to be Motorway Service Areas (MSAs). Leeming Bar was granted permission to upgrade to an MSA after a Public Inquiry in 2010/11 at which the Kirby Hill proposal was once again refused. This meant that according to the designations, in 2021 there were technically no MSAs between Wetherby Services and Durham Services, a distance of 60.8 miles (97.8 km).

In 2013, the Department for Transport recommended that MSAs should be spaced no more than 28 miles (45 km) between each other. This led to three MSA applications for the A1(M) in North Yorkshire: (from South to North)

- Kirby Hill MSA (proposed by Applegreen/Welcome Break). (Note: Applegreen acquired a controlling stake in Welcome Break in 2018. The proposal for the MSA at Kirby Hill was put forward by Applegreen, but the MSA would be branded as Welcome Break.)
- Ripon MSA (proposed by Moto).
- Catterick MSA (proposed by Roadchef).

The Kirby Hill site (Vale of York), was approved after a public inquiry by a UK Government inspector in April 2021. The site had been the subject of three previous Public Inquries about an MSA at the location in 1997, 2003 and 2010. The local opposition to the MSA, Kirby Hill RAMS (Residents Against Motorway Services) stated that they had been fighting for 25 years with the same in-principle objection to an MSA on this site, and that the planning system had been changed in the intervening years; "We feel that the thing that has changed here is the planning system, not the facts. After 25 years of playing the game and having it refused, you have to ask the question; what has changed?" The MSA would be located on the western side of the A1(M) as an on-line MSA, with access both northbound and southbound, between junctions 48 and 49, where a new motorway junction and overbridge would need to be constructed to access the proposed MSA. The local community has criticised the height and visual impact of the new motorway junction, which would be the most prominent structure in the proposed development. The works for a junction on the motorway would also require the A168 road to be moved eastwards from its current location, closer to the village of Kirby Hill.

At the time of the 2021 inquiry, the MSA at Kirby Hill was costed at £40 million. In December 2023, further details were submitted in a new reserved matters planning application which has been opposed by Kirby Hill RAMS and is yet to be determined.

The proposed site is overlooked by two mature English oak trees on the western boundary. Following complaints by residents who saw heavy plant operating in root protection zones during an archaeological investigation of the site, North Yorkshire Council protected the two trees with a Tree Protection Order. The two protected trees - named Bob and Joe - are the latest in a long list of technical environmental constraints that Kirby Hill RAMS say make the site unsuitable for MSA development.

In November 2025, Kirby Hill RAMS challenged the legal validity of the reserved matters application, on the basis that it had not been complete and validly 'made' prior to the expiry date of the outline permission granted by the Inspector. The group claims that the outline permission has therefore expired. North Yorkshire Council disputes this interpretation and says it has taken external legal advice. However this advice has not been made public or shared with councillors.

In April 2026, Kirby Hill RAMS made a formal request to the Council's monitoring officer to investigate the lawfulness of the Council's approach to determining the application, however, in July 2026, councillors for North Yorkshire voted nine-to-five in favour of the services.

Motorway Rest and Services areas between Wetherby and Durham on the A1(M) (northwards)
Location	Distance from Wetherby MSA (Note: Where possible, this is determined from the centre of the car park at Wetherby MSA, to the centre of the named services in the list. Whilst Leeming Bar Services are 28.8 miles from Wetherby, further than Coneygarth Services, the distance from the junction on the motorway to Leeming Bar MRA is further.)	Operator	Notes	Ref
Wetherby	0	Moto	Opened in 2008	
Vale of York	12 miles (19 km)	Welcome Break	Approved in April 2021	
Ripon	18 miles (29 km)	Moto	Proposed by Moto to cover an area of 33 acres (13 ha) at Junction 50 on the A1(M).	
Leeming Bar	28.8 miles (46.3 km)	Moto	The report by the Planning Inspectorate in 2021 stated that the services at Leeming Bar had "...limited poor quality facilities...requires substantial investment and therefore cannot be considered an MSA."	
Coneygarth Truck Stop	28.6 miles (46 km)	Exelby		
Catterick MSA	33 miles (53 km)	Roadchef	Planning permission was granted in July 2022. After a legal issue, this was returned to the council for approval and given further permission in December 2024. Permission was quashed by the High Court in 2026.	
Scotch Corner	38.8 miles (62.4 km)	Moto		
Barton Park	40 miles (64 km)	Moto	Advertised as Barton Park Truck Stop, but plans have been submitted for the site to be upgraded	
Durham MSA	60.8 miles (97.8 km)	Roadchef		

Indicates that the site is an MSA that is operating
Indicates that the site has been given planning permission
Indicates that the site is not an MSA
Indicates that the site has been denied planning permission
Indicates that the site was granted planning permission, but this has been quashed by the High Court

== Facilities ==
The 2017 proposal detailed a 365-space car park and 82 slots for HGVs. Besides the main building, there would be a play area and a dog exercise zone. The 2018 proposal had been extended to 383 car-parking spaces. Just 20 of these are chargepoints for Electric Vehicles.
