= Gordano services =

Motorway service station in Somerset, England

Gordano Services
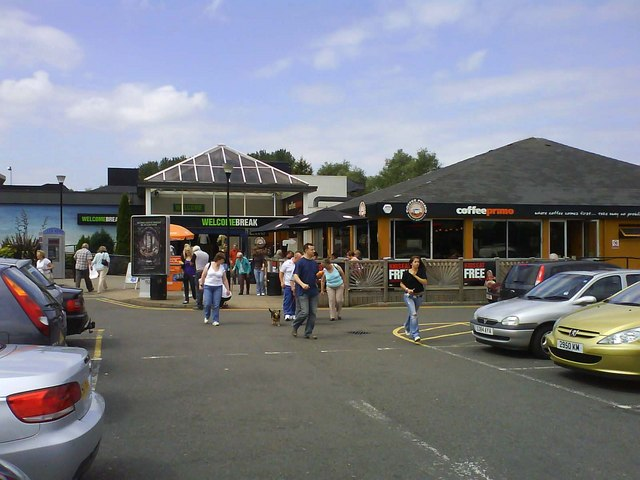

- Location within Somerset

Information
- County: Somerset
- Road: M5, A369
- Coordinates: 51.4766°N 2.7072°W
- Operator: Welcome Break
- Date opened: 1973
- Website: welcomebreak.co.uk/locations/gordano/

Gordano services (/ɡɔːrˈdeɪnoʊ/ gor-DAY-noh) is a motorway service station located at junction 19 of the M5 motorway at the southern end of the Avonmouth Bridge, west of Bristol, England, and close to Portishead. It is owned by Welcome Break and offers KFC, Subway and Burger King food outlets, Waitrose, WH Smith, Starbucks, toilets and shower facilities. New to Gordano services from February 2013 was the opening of another Fonebitz shop offering mobile charging leads, satnavs and ancillaries associated with motorway or general driving.

The services are located off the actual junction; as such, there is only one station rather than a twin complex across the carriageway. The services lie on the Bristol side of the motorway (to the east). The grounds offer views to the Severn Bridge.

The name Gordano comes from Old English and is descriptive of the triangular shape of the whole valley from Clevedon to Portishead, being the ablative singular of the Latinised form of Gorden meaning muddy valley.

Previous: Michaelwood	Motorway service stations on the M5 Motorway	Next: Sedgemoor
