= Sedgemoor services =

Motorway service station in Somerset, England

Sedgemoor Services
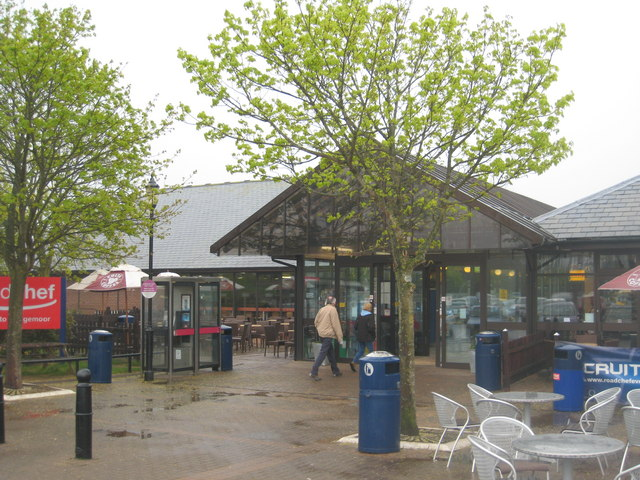

- Location within Somerset

Information
- County: Somerset
- Road: M5 motorway
- Coordinates: 51.2689°N 2.9215°W
- Previous name: Brent Knoll Rest Area

Northbound services
- Operator: Welcome Break
- Date opened: 1987
- Fuel: Shell
- Website: welcomebreak.co.uk/locations/sedgemoor/

Southbound services
- Operator: Roadchef
- Date opened: May 1986
- Fuel: Esso
- Website: www.roadchef.com/locations/sedgemoor-south

Sedgemoor services is a motorway service station on the M5 motorway near the village of Rooks Bridge in Somerset, England. The location of the services can be identified from a long distance because of their proximity to Brent Knoll, an isolated hill on the Somerset Levels.

The northbound station is operated by Welcome Break, and the southbound station is operated by Roadchef.

The northbound station is one of fourteen service stations for which large murals were commissioned from artist David Fisher in the 1990s, designed to reflect the local area and history.

== History ==
The sites opened in 1970 as Brent Knoll Rest Area by the Department for Transport; however, after high rates of crime, the services were transferred to Welcome Break and Roadchef. They were upgraded to Motorway Service Area status in 1987 after two service buildings were added.

=== Construction ===
Construction for the RoadChef side started on Friday 6 December 1985. Sedgemoor District Council had given planning permission for the site in the same week. It would cost £15m on 20 acres on the southbound side. It opened in early May 1986. The northbound side opened in April 1987.

Previous: Gordano	Motorway service stations on the M5 Motorway	Next: Bridgwater
