= Michaelwood services =

Motorway service station in Gloucestershire, England

Michaelwood Services
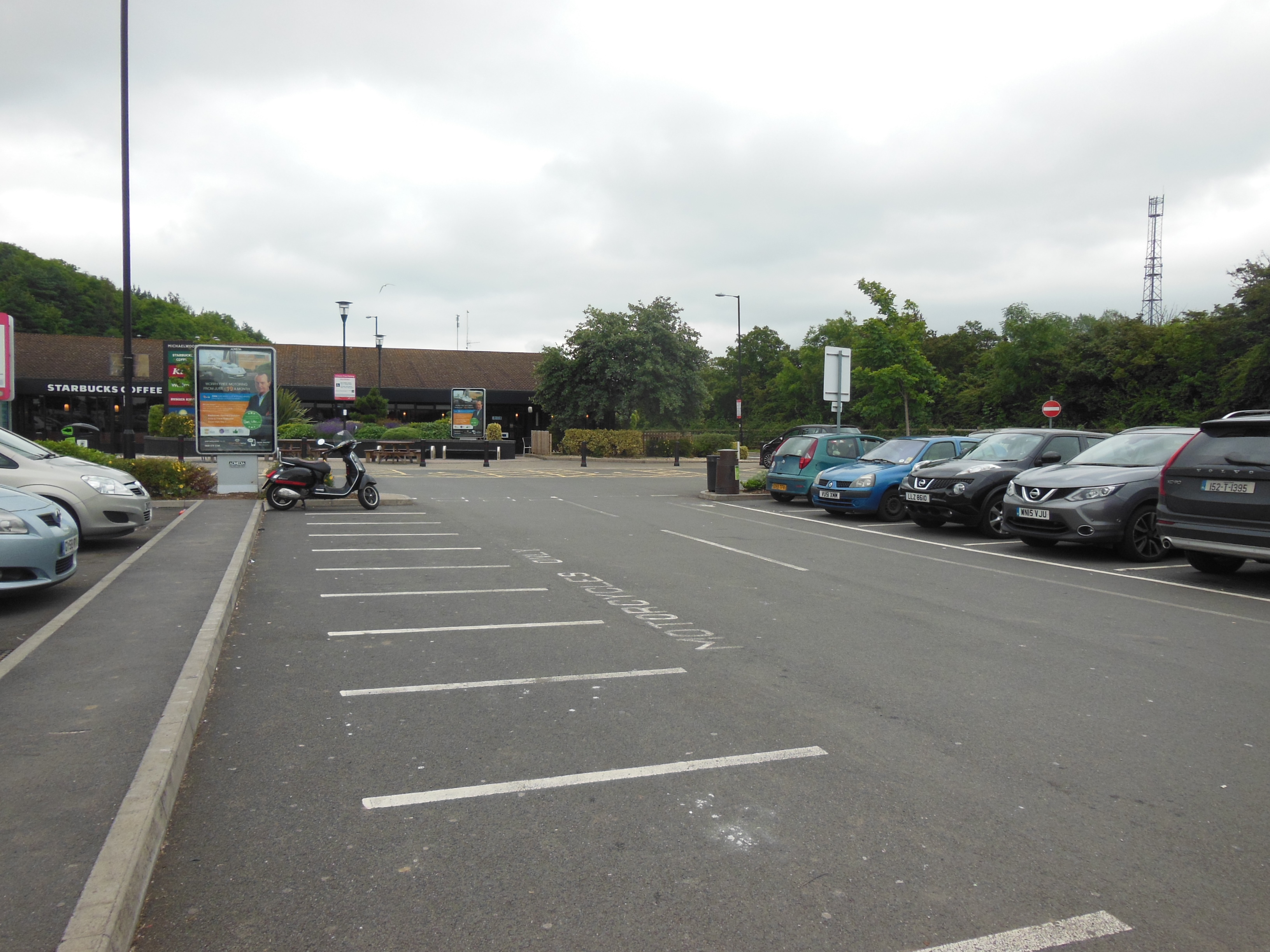
- View in July 2016

- Location within Gloucestershire

Information
- County: Gloucestershire
- Road: M5 Motorway
- Coordinates: 51.656°N 2.431°W
- Operator: Welcome Break
- Date opened: 3 December 1971
- Website: welcomebreak.co.uk/locations/michaelwood/

Michaelwood services is a double sided motorway service station on the M5 motorway near Dursley, England. It is owned by Welcome Break.

== History ==
The site was first announced in early October 1969, when the M5 had reached Avonmouth. It is in Alkington, Gloucestershire.

It was built by George Wimpey, to take six months. Wimpey had built two M5 sections from Almondsbury to Eastington, Stroud. The £5.35 million contract for Almondsbury to Michaelwood was given in early October 1969 for 8 miles (13 km). The £5.6 million contract for Eastington to Michaelwood was awarded to Wimpey in mid-November 1969. This contract included the service area. This contract was the final section of construction of the M5 between Birmingham and Edithmead. The architects were Peter Blair and Peter Curd. It was one of two experimental 'intermediate' service areas. The cafeteria would be open 7:00 am to 10.30 pm.

It opened on 3 December 1971, along with 19 miles (31 km) of the M5, which cost £14 million, with the opening ceremony next to the service area, run by Mobil Motorway Services. It was opened by Michael Heseltine, the 19 miles from Stroudwater to Almondsbury, forming 285 miles (459 km) of motorway to Cumbria. It was the first self-service motorway petrol station in the UK.

The site was extended from June 1979 to March 1980, costing £1 million. A £145,000 steel footbridge was added during 1981.

=== Incidents ===
On Tuesday 29 April 1997, the IRA claimed that a bomb was placed in the service area, and the M5 was closed from junctions 11 to 14. Armed police were called at 8:00 am on 29 June 1999.

== Facilities ==
The site ran out of fuel in early December 1973, along with other M5 service areas, and again in late May 1979. Ross Motorway Services took over from early 1977, headquartered at Leicester Forest East services. Motoross became Welcome Break in the mid-1980s.

It was underestimated how popular the services would be in the 1970s and early 1980s, in the summer.

On St George's Day in 1983 the restaurant had a themed menu, and guests were greeted by a staff member dressed as a dragon.

The service area received a glowing report by Which? Magazine in July 1991, describing the restaurant as being 'peaceful' and 'attractively decorated'. Pont Abraham Services was also praised. It also gave Strensham services a terrible report (along with Farthing Corner and Charnock Richard services), but that was often due to long queues, and dirty toilets.

Throughout February 1992 the site offered a free meal to anyone called Michael Wood, with other service areas offering the same to such eponymous guests.
