= Portbury =

Coordinates: 51.4699°N 2.7163°W

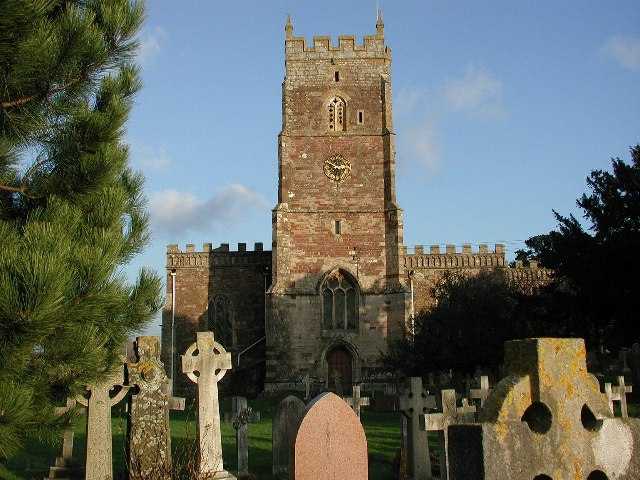
- St Mary's Church, Portbury

- Location within Somerset
- Population: 827 (2011)
- OS grid reference: ST502748
- Unitary authority: North Somerset
- Ceremonial county: Somerset
- Region: South West
- Country: England
- Sovereign state: United Kingdom
- Post town: BRISTOL
- Postcode district: BS20
- Dialling code: 01275
- Police: Avon and Somerset
- Fire: Avon
- Ambulance: South Western
- UK Parliament: North Somerset

Portbury is a village and civil parish in Somerset, England, within the unitary authority of North Somerset. The parish includes the hamlet Sheepway, which is situated on moorland at the northern edge of the Gordano valley, between the Gordano services on the M5 motorway and Portishead, near the Royal Portbury Dock. The parish has a population of 827.

== History ==
The Romans are known to have had a wharf or hard at Portbury, probably for shipbuilding, as the commander of the logistics port of Ad Sabrinam at Seamills was charged with supplying ships to carry troops and supplies to the legions across the Severn in South Wales. It was used for the export of lead and tin from mines on the Mendip Hills. Sheepway (Old English schip weg) - the port of Portbury - was probably in use in later, Saxon, times. The Marina dock in Portishead had a right-angled southern dogleg navigable down to Sheepway, giving the town its name - the "Port's headland".

Portbury is mentioned in the Exeter Domesday Book (Liber Exoniensis) and was given by William the Conqueror to his second favourite, Bishop Geoffrey de Mowbray of Coutances — the "battling bishop" - sword in one hand and crook in the other. (Favourite No. 1 was Bishop Odo of Bayeux, who was William's half-brother and was given the Sussex Godwin land around Bosham.) Bishop Geoffrey crowned Duke William as King of England in a two-and-a-half-hour ceremony in French at Westminster Abbey on Christmas Day 1066; the English ceremony that followed took only 40 minutes. The manor had previously been held by the Godwin family, who were the most powerful family in the country. Godwin (d. 1053) was installed by King Cnut as the first Earl of Wessex; Harold, his son, was the loser at Hastings in 1066. His daughter Edith was queen to Edward the Confessor. So in Saxon times Portbury must have been an important place, but no pre-1066 record or trace exists. It first appears in written history in the Domesday Book in the Hundred of Portbury, a sub-division of the shire of Somerset. The Domesday Book states, "Godwin held it from the King": Godwin was Harold II's eldest son and also held the title of Sheriff of Somerset. From the Anglo-Saxon Chronicle for 1068 we know that Godwin returned from exile in Ireland with a small force "at the mouth of the River Avon", probably intent on recapture of the former manor, but was routed by Aolnoth, his father's 'Staller' (an adjutant position - now in Willam's employ). Aolnoth was killed in the confrontation, but his surviving family become the Berkeley dynasty - see below. There would have existed in Portbury itself a substantial manor house within defensive boundaries that would have held the court and storehouses for grain and weaponry. The village itself is small but in former times ruled over most of the Gordano valley and the remote satellite enclave of Hamgreen.

In later Norman times Robert Fitzharding, the Reeve of Bristol (the King's local representative), was rewarded with the Manor of Portbury. He purchased other local manors and moved between them with his entourage of upwards of 200 people, so the manor house complex, yet to be found, must have been substantial. He was made the first Earl of Berkeley. It is said that his wife Eva never left Portbury after moving there, and subsequent Berkeley heirs were brought up there before Berkeley Castle was made a comfortable home. She founded the 'Whiteladies' convent of St. Mary Magdalene, hence giving Bristol two of its street names. He founded St. Augustine's Abbey, now the Bristol Cathedral. It is recorded that the Berkeley family preferred to spend Christmas at Portbury. There is a Berkeley Chantry chapel with early Berkeley family burials in St Mary's Church dating from around 1190.

Descendants of the Berkeley family married into the family of Coke of Holcombe, Norfolk who held the manor until 1784, when it was sold to James Gordon and inherited by William Abdy. On his death in 1870 it was sold to Sir Greville Smyth of Long Ashton.

Portbury had its own railway station on the Portishead line until the Beeching axe fell. The village main street was cut through by the M5 motorway opened in February 1973. Although the M5 is close, it has actually made the village much less busy as it was previously on the main through route from Bristol to Portishead, from St. Georges, Easton in Gordano and on through Sheepway to Old Bristol Road in Portishead. The Rudgleigh — Easton Bypass and the Portbury Hundred either side of the motorway junction isolated Portbury from through traffic.

== Governance ==
The parish council has responsibility for local issues, including setting an annual precept (local rate) to cover the council's operating costs and producing annual accounts for public scrutiny. The parish council evaluates local planning applications and works with the local police, district council officers, and neighbourhood watch groups on matters of crime, security, and traffic. The parish council's role also includes initiating projects for the maintenance and repair of parish facilities, such as the village hall or community centre, playing fields and playgrounds, as well as consulting with the district council on the maintenance, repair, and improvement of highways, drainage, footpaths, public transport, and street cleaning. Conservation matters (including trees and listed buildings) and environmental issues are also of interest to the council.

The parish falls within the unitary authority of North Somerset which was created in 1996, as established by the Local Government Act 1992. It provides a single tier of local government with responsibility for almost all local government functions within its area including local planning and building control, local roads, council housing, environmental health, markets and fairs, refuse collection, recycling, cemeteries, crematoria, leisure services, parks, and tourism. They are also responsible for education, social services, libraries, main roads, public transport, trading standards, waste disposal and strategic planning, although fire, police and ambulance services are provided jointly with other authorities through the Avon Fire and Rescue Service, Avon and Somerset Constabulary and the South Western Ambulance Service.

North Somerset's area covers part of the ceremonial county of Somerset but it is administered independently of the non-metropolitan county. Its administrative headquarters are in the town hall in Weston-super-Mare. Between 1 April 1974 and 1 April 1996, it was the Woodspring district of the county of Avon. Before 1974 that the parish was part of the Long Ashton Rural District.

The parish is represented in the House of Commons of the Parliament of the United Kingdom as part of the North Somerset constituency. It elects one Member of Parliament (MP) by the first past the post system of election, currently Sadik Al-Hassan of the Labour Party. It was also part of the South West England constituency of the European Parliament prior to Britain leaving the European Union in January 2020.

== Transport ==
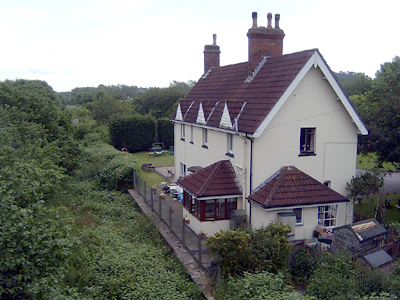
The disused railway station at Portbury

Portbury is well served by roads given the nearby M5 and A369 which links to Bristol and Portishead. Part of Royal Portbury Dock is within the parish.

The parish used to have a railway station on the Portishead Railway. The station was closed with the line in 1964. Reopening to Portishead is scheduled for 2026, with an intermediate station at Pill but not at Portbury.

== Religious sites ==
There was a small Augustinian Priory founded in Portbury on land donated by Isabella, Countess of Albemarle in the twelfth century, of which there is still a substantial part remaining in the centre of the village.

The Anglican parish St Mary's Church dates from the 12th century, with alteration and extension in the 13th and restoration between 1870 and 1875. It has a Norman doorway and a grand fifteenth-century porch. Inside there are early Berkeley burials. It is a Grade I listed building.

== Local Newspapers ==
The local Clevedon Mercury and Portishead Times newspapers are delivered to residents free of charge usually by Saturday morning.

== Schools ==
St. Mary's primary school a small school of just over 105 and also has transport to Gordano school in Portishead.
