= Taunton Deane services =

Motorway service station in Somerset, England

Taunton Deane Services
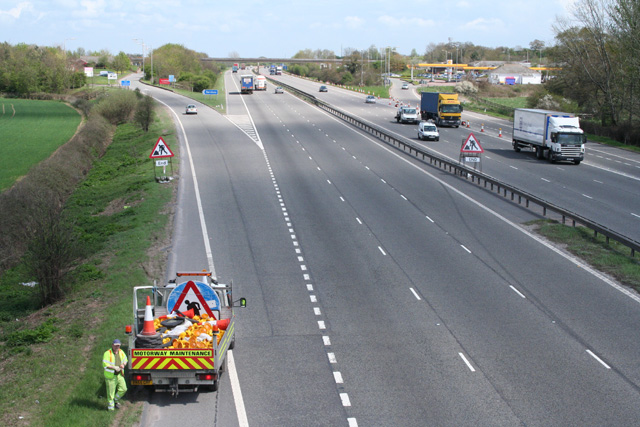
- General view from the M5

- Location within Somerset

Information
- County: Somerset
- Road: M5 motorway
- Coordinates: 50.9765°N 3.1466°W
- Operator: Roadchef
- Date opened: 15 April 1977
- Website: www.roadchef.com/locations/taunton-deane-northbound

Taunton Deane services is a double sided motorway service station on the M5 motorway near Taunton, England. It is owned by Roadchef.

== Location ==
The services are located between junctions 25 and 26 of the M5 motorway in Somerset. There are two sites, one for each direction connected by a walk bridge. After a spate of suicides by hanging, the bridge had anti-suicide bars installed.

== History ==
Construction was started by Linked Group Construction of Cheshire, costing £0.75 million, who had earlier built Sandbach services in 1976. The building firm collapsed, and construction was held up by nine months. Warings of Portsmouth took over, and completed the service area in nine weeks.

The southbound site fully opened on Friday 15 April 1977. The site had seating for 250. The northbound site opened in 1989, where there was limited catering at the time.

== Facilities ==
The site employs around 130 people. In 2012, they were awarded RoadChef's Heroes of the Year Awards.

A Costa Coffee drive-through opened on the southbound services in 2019. A corresponding northbound drive thru opened the following year.

== Cleanliness ==
The services were notorious in the early 2000s for its poor cleanliness rating. In general, the southbound side receives better ratings than the northbound side. In 2012, the Food Standards Agency gave both sides a rating of five out of five.

Previous: Bridgwater	Motorway service stations on the M5 motorway	Next: Cullompton
