= Bridgwater services =

Motorway service station in Somerset, England

Bridgwater Services
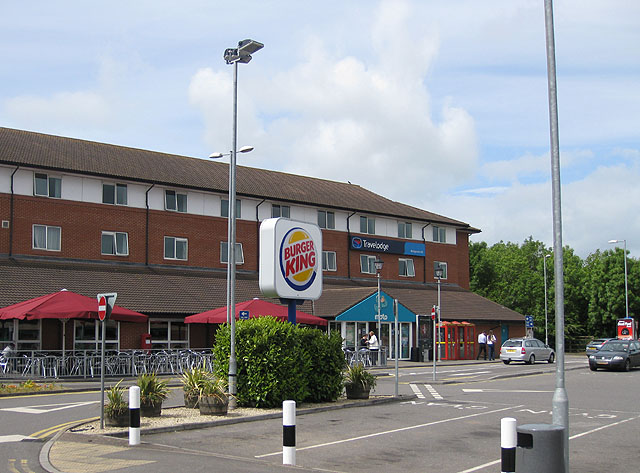

- Location within Somerset

Information
- County: Somerset
- Road: M5
- Coordinates: 51.1048°N 2.9956°W
- Operator: Moto Hospitality
- Previous operator: First
- Date opened: 1999
- Website: moto-way.com/services/bridgwater/

Bridgwater services is a motorway service station on the M5 motorway near Bridgwater in Somerset, England. The services are located off junction 24, near the Somerset town of Bridgwater and can be accessed from both carriageways via a roundabout on the A38 road. It is owned by Moto. It used to be operated by First Motorway Services.

In 2021, it was voted the worst motorway service station in the UK.

Previous: Sedgemoor	Motorway service stations on the M5 Motorway	Next: Taunton Deane
