= Maidstone services =

Motorway service area in Kent, England

Maidstone Services
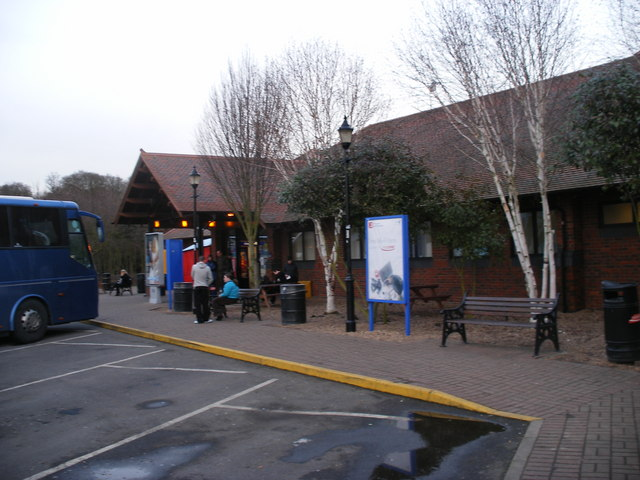

- Location within Kent

Information
- County: Kent
- Road: M20
- Coordinates: 51°16′1″N 0°36′51″E
- Operator: Roadchef
- Date opened: 1997
- Website: www.roadchef.com/locations/maidstone

Maidstone services are a motorway service station directly off Junction 8 of the M20 motorway near Maidstone, England, owned by Roadchef.

They were the first set of services to open on the M20, opening in 1997. Until the 2007 opening of Stop 24 services at Junction 11, they were also the only set on the motorway. There are two entrances at each end of a walkway, one for people arriving by car and one for HGV drivers, with shops and restaurants at each end.
