= Skelton Lake services =

Motorway service station in West Yorkshire, England

Skelton Lake
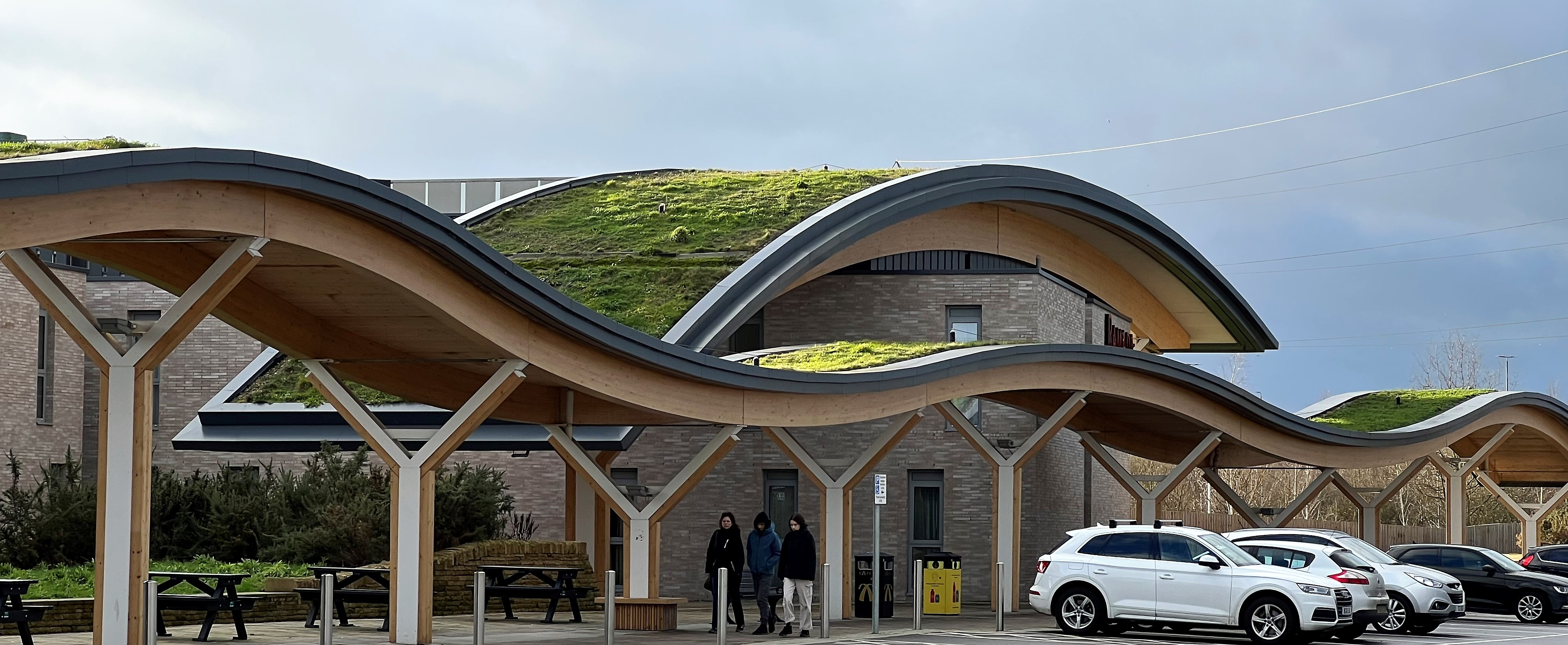
- Skelton Lake services on the M1 at Leeds

- Location in West Yorkshire, England Location on the UK motorway network

Information
- County: West Yorkshire
- Road: M1
- Coordinates: 53.7727°N 1.4719°W
- Operator: Extra
- Date opened: March 2020
- Website: extraservices.co.uk/locations/leeds-skelton-lake-services-m1-j45/

Skelton Lake services (also known as Leeds Skelton Lake services) is a motorway service area operated by Extra, on the M1 motorway's junction 45 near Leeds, West Yorkshire, England. It is south of the motorway junction, making it accessible from both carriageways and the A63 (linking to Leeds centre). It is also the last services on the M1.

== History ==
The M1/A1 link road between Leeds (now junction 43 of the M1) and the A1(M) at Hook Moor, opened in February 1999. Although the slip roads were built in 1999, it was ten years before junction 45 was opened to lead along a 2.5-mile (4 km) dual carriageway (designated the A63) westwards into Leeds. Extra submitted an application to build a service station in the area (known as Skelton Grange) in 2005, which was rejected by the government.

A second set of amended plans was lodged with Leeds City Council in spring 2016, and permission for the site, 2.5 miles (4.0 km) southeast of Leeds Dock, was granted with an interim bill of £50 million in early 2017.

The services started to be constructed in the summer of 2018, at the M1's junction 45 with the A63, it is accessible in both directions of the motorway and from the A-road. The site provided 400 jobs during the construction phase, and now employs 300 people. Morgan Sindall were appointed as builders and by 2018, the bill was estimated at £60 million, with a projected opening date of summer 2019.

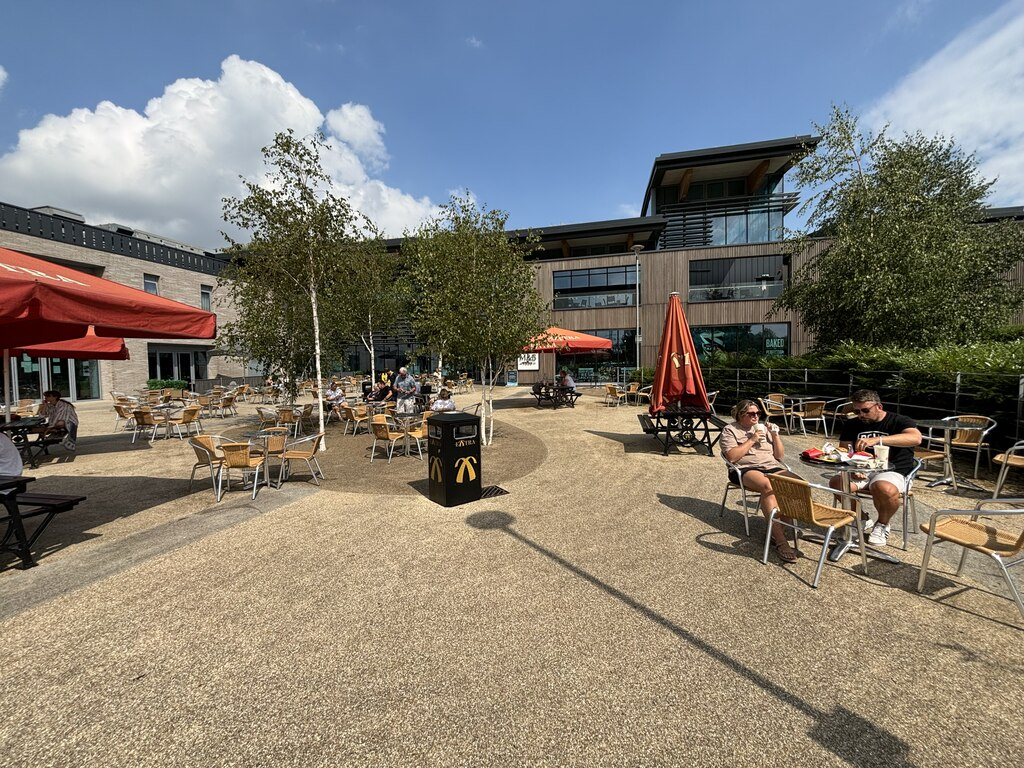
Seating at the services

The £64 million service station opened in late March 2020 during the outset of the UK's first COVID-19 pandemic lockdown with just the general shop and fuelling station. The station was billed as the greenest motorway service station in the United Kingdom, having a "living roof", access to the nature reserve at St Aidan's, and a viewing platform overlooking Skelton Lake. Skelton Lake covers 60 acres (24 ha), and is a remnant of opencast coaling operations in the area. The station's design, particularly its roof, reflects the green corridor that site sits in. The station also has an adjoining 100-bedroom hotel.

Next southbound: Woolley Edge	Motorway service stations on the M1 motorway	Next northbound: None on M1; Wetherby (A1(M))
