= Woolley Edge services =

Motorway service station on the M1 in Yorkshire, England

Woolley Edge Services
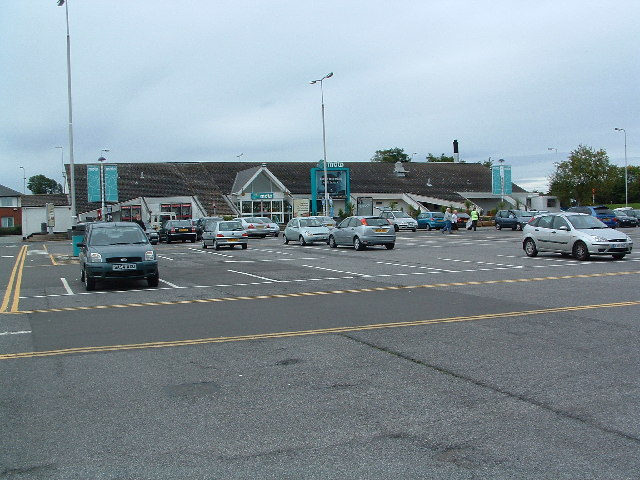

- Location in West Yorkshire, England Location on the UK motorway network

Information
- County: West Yorkshire
- Road: M1
- Coordinates: 53.6226°N 1.5494°W
- Operator: Moto Hospitality
- Date opened: 1972
- Website: moto-way.com/services/woolley-edge-northbound/

Woolley Edge services is a motorway service station on the M1 motorway within the borough of the City of Wakefield, West Yorkshire, England. It lies between junctions 38 and 39 close to West Bretton and west of the village of Woolley.

== History ==
The first Esso Taverna service area to open was the £600,000 Washington-Birtley service area in August 1970.

Both sites were opened in 1972 by Taverna (Esso). The site opened in the first week of January 1972, but only for fuel. The construction cost was £420,000. The site fully opened in March 1972. The architects were Challen, Floyd, Slaski and Todd.

Parking was for 425 cars, 110 trucks and 12 coaches. 140 staff would work there. One side was 14 acres, and the other side was 16 acres. There was no bridge connecting the two.

=== Ownership ===
It was one of five sites in the UK sold to Granada in March 1973 for £2.5 million. The current owner is Moto. In 2006, Moto changed the branding to Marks and Spencer and Costa Coffee; also on site are the brands Burger King and Travelodge.

== Structure ==
The services is split into two sites, one on the northbound and one on southbound sides of the M1. The two sites are connected by foot via a local road bridge over the motorway. The northbound side is partly in West Bretton, and the southbound side is in Woolley, West Yorkshire.

There are local access roads from both sites onto the same bridge albeit but are not signed for the majority of traffic, and, as of 26 September 2009, both access roads were fitted with automatic barriers. The services are close to the Barnsley/South Yorkshire border. Despite the services being in the Wakefield district, they're slightly closer to Barnsley than to the centre of Wakefield.

The Hallam Line, a railway between Leeds and Sheffield via Barnsley, passes directly beneath the service area and motorway, but there is no railway station with access to the site.

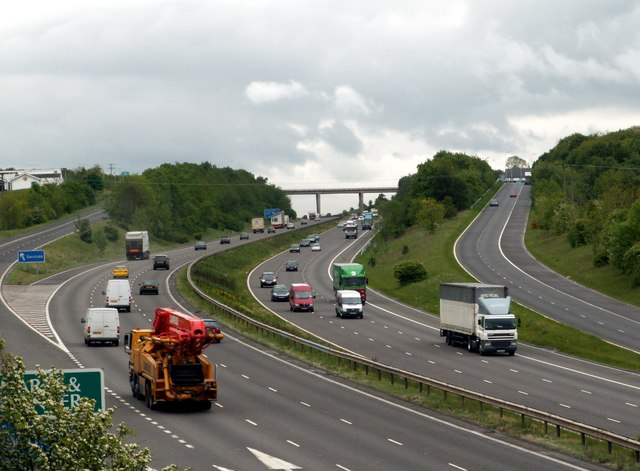
Services from the south, looking north, in May 2007

Next southbound: Woodall	Motorway service stations on the M1 motorway	Next northbound: Skelton Lake
