= Avonmouth Bridge =

M5 bridge over River Avon, Bristol, England

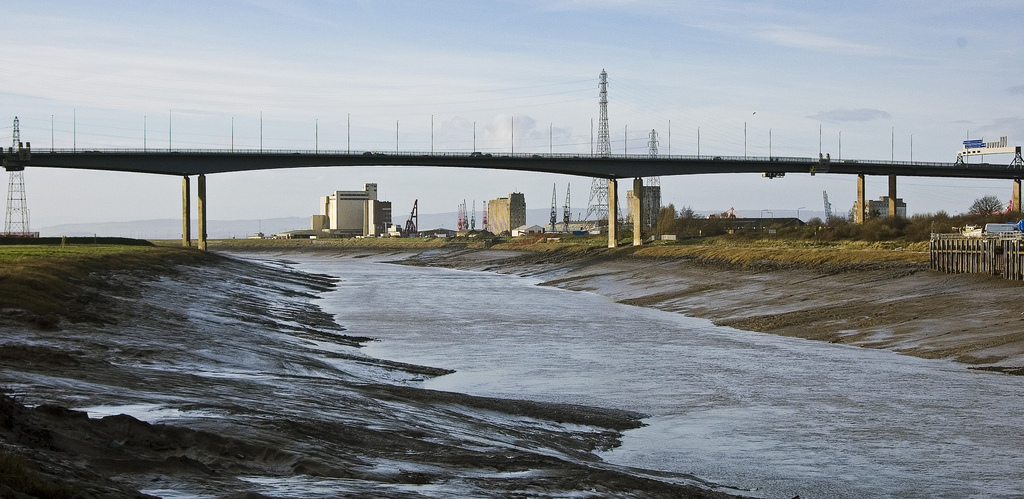
- Coordinates: 51.4887°N 2.6928°W
- Carries: M5; National Cycle Route 41
- Crosses: River Avon
- Locale: Avonmouth, Bristol; Portbury, Somerset
- Maintained by: National Highways

Characteristics
- Design: Box girder bridge
- Material: Reinforced concrete, steel
- Total length: 4,554 ft (1,388 m)
- Width: 132.5 ft (40 m)
- Longest span: 538 ft (164 m)
- Clearance below: 100 ft (30.5 m)
- No. of lanes: 4 each direction; Shared-use path along the south-westbound parapet

History
- Opened: May 1974

Statistics
- Daily traffic: ▼131,812 (2018); Count point (Bristol); Count point (Somerset)

Location
- Interactive map of Avonmouth Bridge

Location in Bristol
Location in Somerset
Location in UK motorway network

The Avonmouth Bridge is a road bridge that carries the M5 motorway over the River Avon into Somerset near Bristol, England. The main span is 538 ft (164 m) long, and the bridge is 4,554 ft (1,388 m) long, with an air draught above mean high water level of 98.4 ft (30 m). It also has a separate footpath and cycleway which connects the B4054 near Avonmouth station with the Royal Portbury Dock and the village of Pill.

== Construction ==
The bridge was built with three lanes each way, with full hard shoulders. In 1995–2000, it was widened to four lanes each way, with the result that the hard shoulders are no longer of full width.

The bridge was built to allow tall ships to pass underneath. This gave the bridge steep gradients that cause heavy vehicles to slow down, resulting in congestion during rush hour and the summer tourist season: traffic can back up both on the bridge and on the approaches.

The construction contract was let to Fairfield-Mabey and commenced in 1969; Fairfield-Mabey placed a sub-contract with Tarmac Civil Engineering for the foundations, piers and deck concreting works.

== Surface ==
The approach and initial climb up the bridge have a smooth asphalt surface; however, on the top of the bridge the surface was uneven and bumpy when it was built. In September 2006, it was announced that the entire bridge would be resurfaced, only five years after the last resurfacing. This was completed in November 2009 by the construction firm Stirling Lloyd. However, the surfacing was carried out by Stirling Lloyd's partners Aeschlimann AG from Switzerland using its own workforce and importing all the plant used. A new type of asphalt called Gussasphalt was used on the bridge deck. The project was managed by Stirling Lloyd's Darren Holmes. In addition to having a smooth, skid-resistant finish, it requires no compaction and can be applied in very thin layers ( Each layer only 25 mm thick), thus reducing the weight added to the bridge. It is also flexible and as a result should last longer than the previous resurfacing.
