= Wetherby services =

Motorway service area on the A1(M) in North Yorkshire, England

Wetherby Services
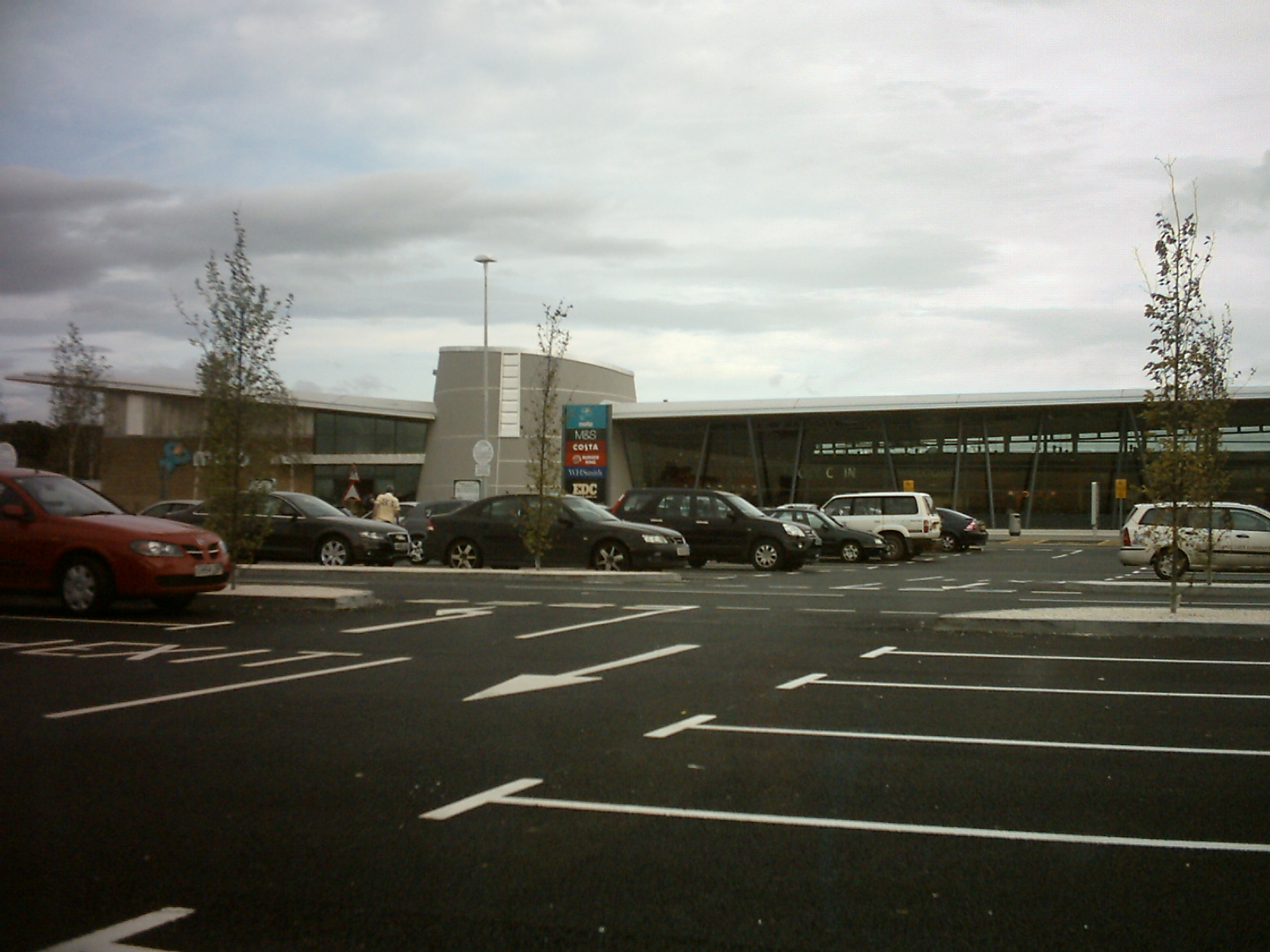

- Location in North Yorkshire, England Location on border of West Yorkshire Location on the UK motorway network

Information
- County: North Yorkshire
- Road: A1(M)
- Coordinates: 53.9470°N 1.3680°W
- Operator: Moto Hospitality
- Date opened: 5 July 2008 (petrol station); 23 August 2008 (main services)
- Website: moto-way.com/services/wetherby/

Wetherby Services is a motorway service area north of Wetherby on the A1(M) motorway in northern England. It opened in September 2008, and the hotel (a 126-bed Days Inn hotel, the first major hotel in the north of the town) opened later. The service station is situated at junction 46 of the A1(M), the interchange between the A1(M) and the B1224. The service area is accessed from a roundabout, making it accessible from both sides of the motorway. It lies just inside North Yorkshire in the parish of Kirk Deighton, although the town of Wetherby is on the West Yorkshire side of the boundary. It is operated by Moto Hospitality.

The next motorway services in each direction are at Durham (north) and Ferrybridge (south).

The service station uses the latest 'green technologies' in its construction and running, making it the UK's first carbon neutral service station.

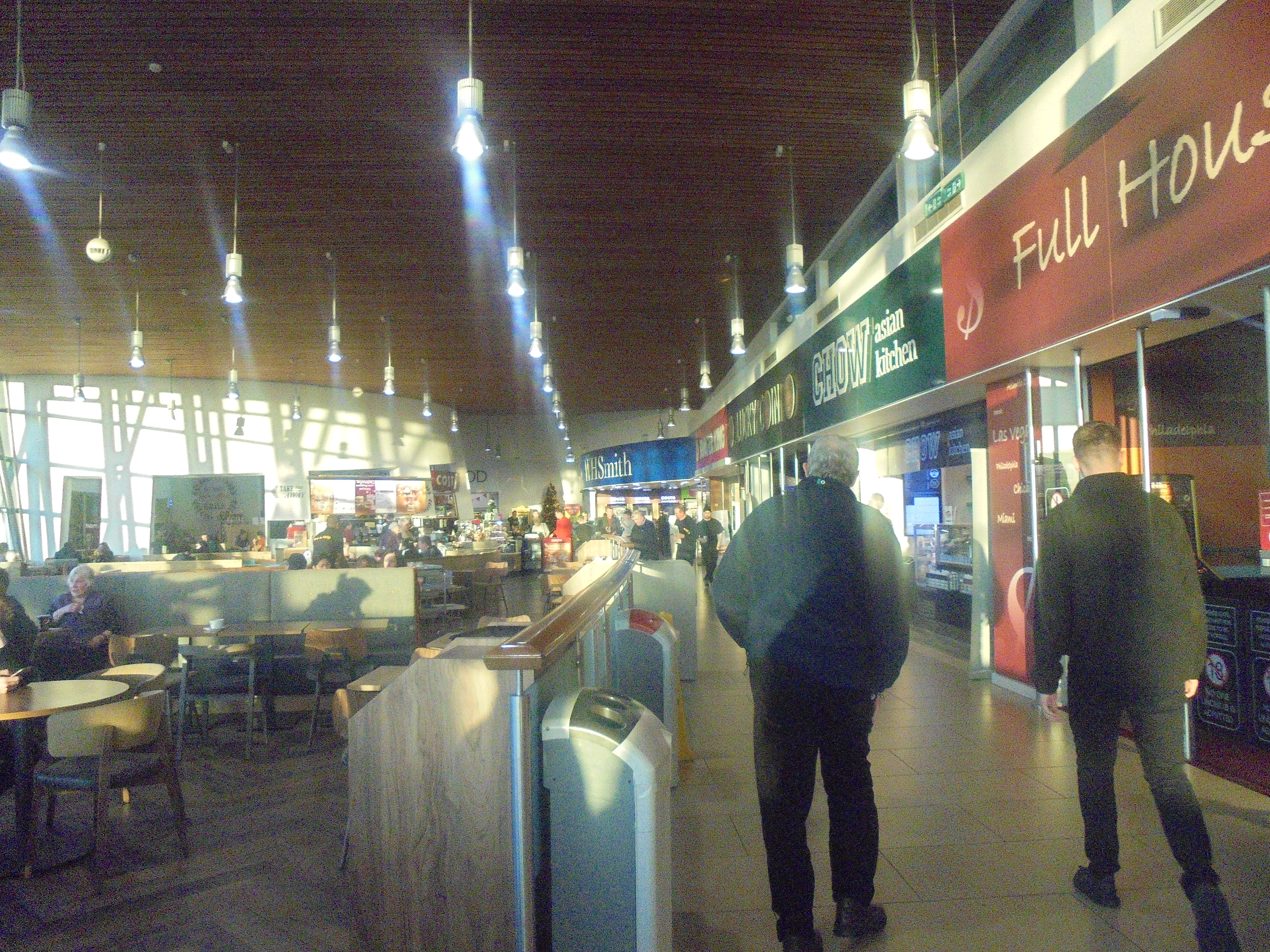
Interior of Wetherby services

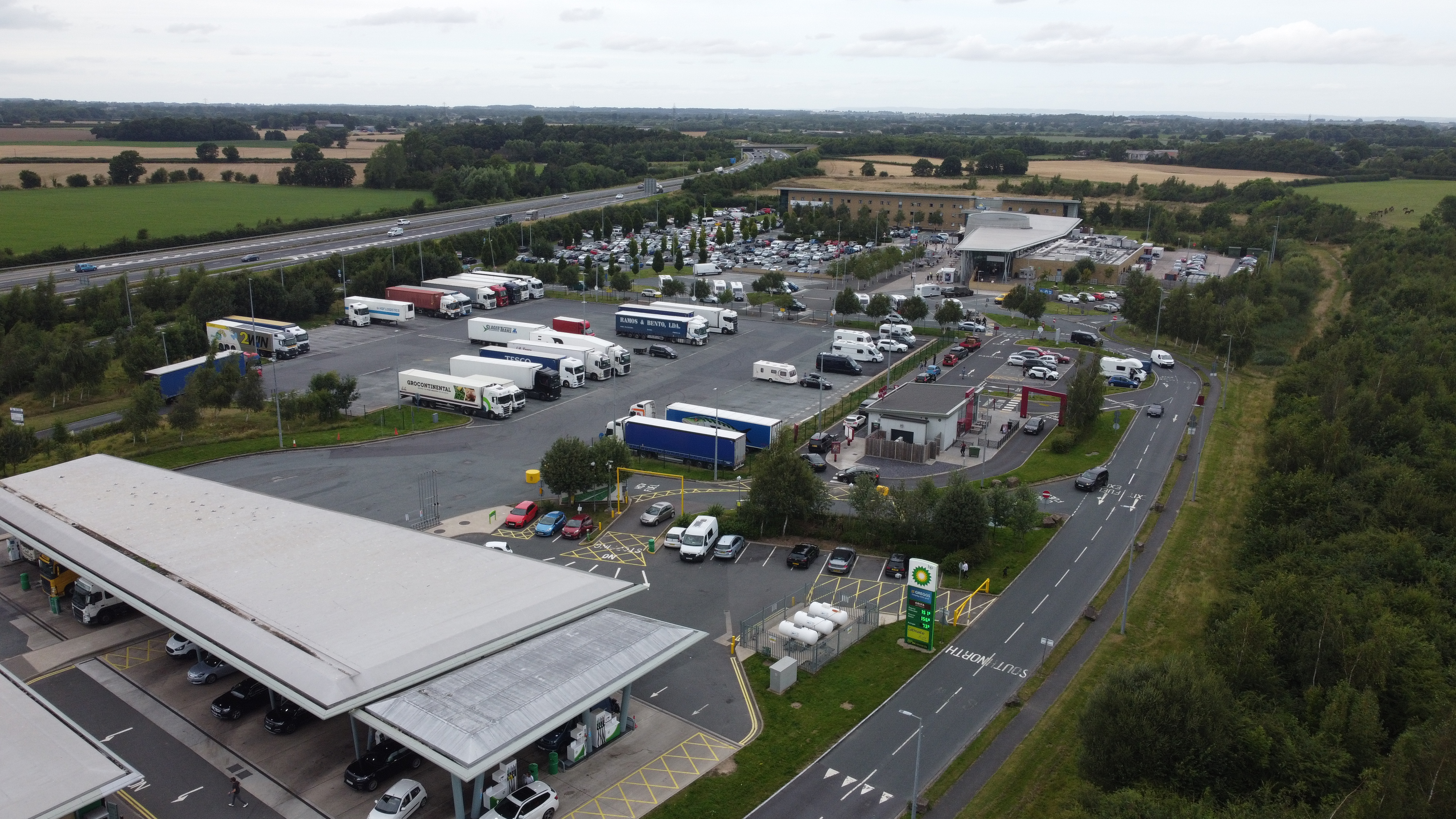
Aerial view of Wetherby services

In a 2018 user survey of England's motorway service areas (MSAs), Wetherby scored a 99% satisfaction rating, putting it third in the country and the top Moto site overall. In 2017, Wetherby MSA was awarded an 84% approval rating.

Next southbound: Skelton Lake	Motorway service stations on the M1 motorway	Next northbound: None

Next southbound: Ferrybridge	Motorway service stations on the A1(M) motorway	Next northbound: Durham services (A1(M))
