= Roadchef =

Company which operates motorway service areas

Roadchef Motorways Limited
- Type: Private
- Industry: Hospitality
- Founded: 17 July 1973; 53 years ago
- Headquarters: Norton Canes, England, UK
- Area served: United Kingdom
- Key people: Robert Prynn (Chairman); Tim Gittins (CEO)
- Revenue: ▲£191.8 million (2018); £188.8 million (2017)
- Net income: £6.3 million
- Total assets: £401 million
- Number of employees: 3,000+
- Parent: Macquarie Group
- Website: www.roadchef.com

Roadchef Motorways Limited is a company which operates 21 motorway service areas in the United Kingdom. It is based in Norton Canes, England.

== History ==
Roadchef was founded in July 1973 as a joint venture between Lindley Catering Investments and Galleon World Travel, with the first Roadchef opening at Killington Lake Services on the M6.

By 1998, Roadchef had built a portfolio of 21 sites. A large expansion occurred in 1998 when Roadchef agreed to purchase Blue Boar Group and Take A Break for a total of £80 million, gaining the company an extra four services plus one under-construction site.

In September 2014, it was announced that owners Delek Group were selling Roadchef to Antin Infrastructure Partners for £153 million.

=== Employee Benefit Scheme legal action ===
In 1986, Patrick Gee, the managing director of the company, set up an employee benefit scheme to give ordinary workers shares in the company. After Gee's early death, Timothy Ingram Hill took over as Roadchef's managing director, having helped lead a management buyout of the company in 1983. With his status as one of the original trustees of the employee benefit scheme, he set up a second scheme where he was the sole beneficiary, and secretly transferred the bulk of the employees' shares to it. This left employees with a much reduced scheme.

Tim Warwick, who worked as Roadchef's company secretary at the time of the transfer, blew the whistle on the Ingram Hill's transfer of the shares in 1998. A prolonged legal battle ensued, with the courts eventually declaring the transaction void in 2015 and ordered Ingram Hill to repay the profit he made from the shares he appropriated.

Issues arose afterwards, when the trustees of the scheme discovered that an extra £10 million had been paid in tax for the shares by Ingram Hill and was thus due to be given to them. This money was recovered by the trustees, but HMRC insisted that most of the tax should be paid by the trustees, due to Ingram Hill possessing the shares instead of the employees when the government passed legislation to make employee share schemes tax-free. The trustees argued that the shares should not be taxed, as the scheme should be in the tax-free category if Ingram Hill had not appropriated the shares. The trustees further argued that the scheme could be retrospectively added to the list of tax-free schemes.

By July 2019, the ongoing dispute with HMRC was the only remaining obstacle in distributing the money to the affected employees, with the current Roadchef management expressing support for the trustees. As of August 2020, the money had not been distributed back to the staff.

== Facilities ==
Roadchef motorway service areas have varying facilities. All sites provide two hours free parking, toilets and food 24 hours a day, seven days a week.

== Locations ==
Roadchef motorway service areas

Roadchef operate the following motorway services:

- Annandale Water (A74(M))
- Bothwell (M74 southbound)
- Catterick (A1(M)) - approved in July 2022
- Chester (M56)
- Clacket Lane (M25)
- Durham (A1(M))
- Folkestone services (M20)
- Hamilton (M74 northbound)
- Killington Lake (M6 southbound)
- Magor (M4)
- Maidstone (M20)
- Northampton (M1)
- Norton Canes (M6 Toll)
- Pont Abraham (M4)
- Rownhams (M27)
- Sandbach (M6)
- Sedgemoor (M5 southbound)
- Stafford (M6 southbound)
- Strensham (M5)
- Taunton Deane (M5)
- Tibshelf (M1)
- Watford Gap (M1)

And one A-road site at:

- Sutton Scotney (A34)
