= Burnham Without =

Civil parish in Somerset, England

Coordinates: 51.234°N 2.957°W

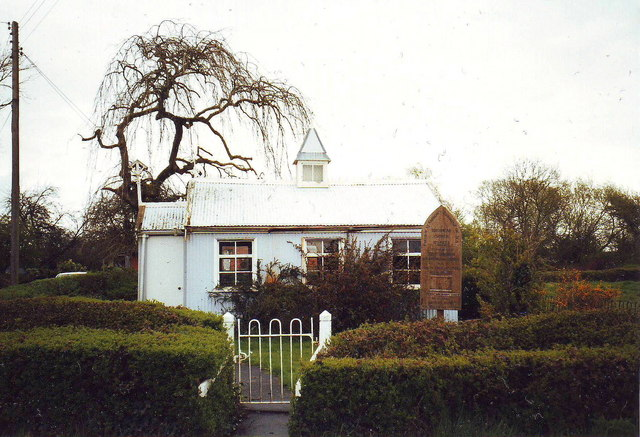
Edithmead Church

Burnham Without is a civil parish in the main located to the east of Burnham-on-Sea and to the north and northeast of Highbridge in Somerset, England.

The parish includes the villages of Watchfield and Edithmead. The developed fringes of eastern Burnham itself are also in the parish.

The parish in 2011 had a population of 796.

Mostly rural Burnham Without consists of drained, low-lying agricultural land between the coast at Burnham itself and Brent Knoll Iron Age hill fort, East Huntspill, Walrow and Mark villages

== History ==
The civil parish was formed in 1896, when the rural areas of the civil parish of Highbridge (itself created only in 1894 out of the large parish of Burnham) were separated from the urban area of Highbridge. The parish formed part of Axbridge Rural District until 1974, when it joined the new District of Sedgemoor.

== Governance ==
The parish council has responsibility for local issues, including setting an annual precept (local rate) to cover the council's operating costs and producing annual accounts for public scrutiny on their associated web site. The parish council evaluates local planning applications and works with the local police, district council officers, and on matters of local concern and traffic. The parish council's role also includes initiating projects for the maintenance and repair of parish facilities, as well as consulting with the district council on planning matters and the maintenance, repair, and improvement of highways, drainage, footpaths, public transport, and street cleaning. Conservation matters (including trees and listed buildings) and environmental issues are also the responsibility of the council.

For local government purposes, since 1 April 2023, the village comes under the unitary authority of Somerset Council. Prior to this, it was part of the non-metropolitan district of Sedgemoor, which was formed on 1 April 1974 under the Local Government Act 1972, having previously been part of Axbridge Rural District.

It is also part of the Bridgwater county constituency represented in the House of Commons of the Parliament of the United Kingdom. It elects one Member of Parliament (MP) by the first past the post system of election, and was part of the South West England constituency of the European Parliament prior to Britain leaving the European Union in January 2020, which elected seven MEPs using the d'Hondt method of party-list proportional representation.
