= M5 motorway =

Motorway in England

M5

- M5 highlighted in blue Shown with UK motorway network

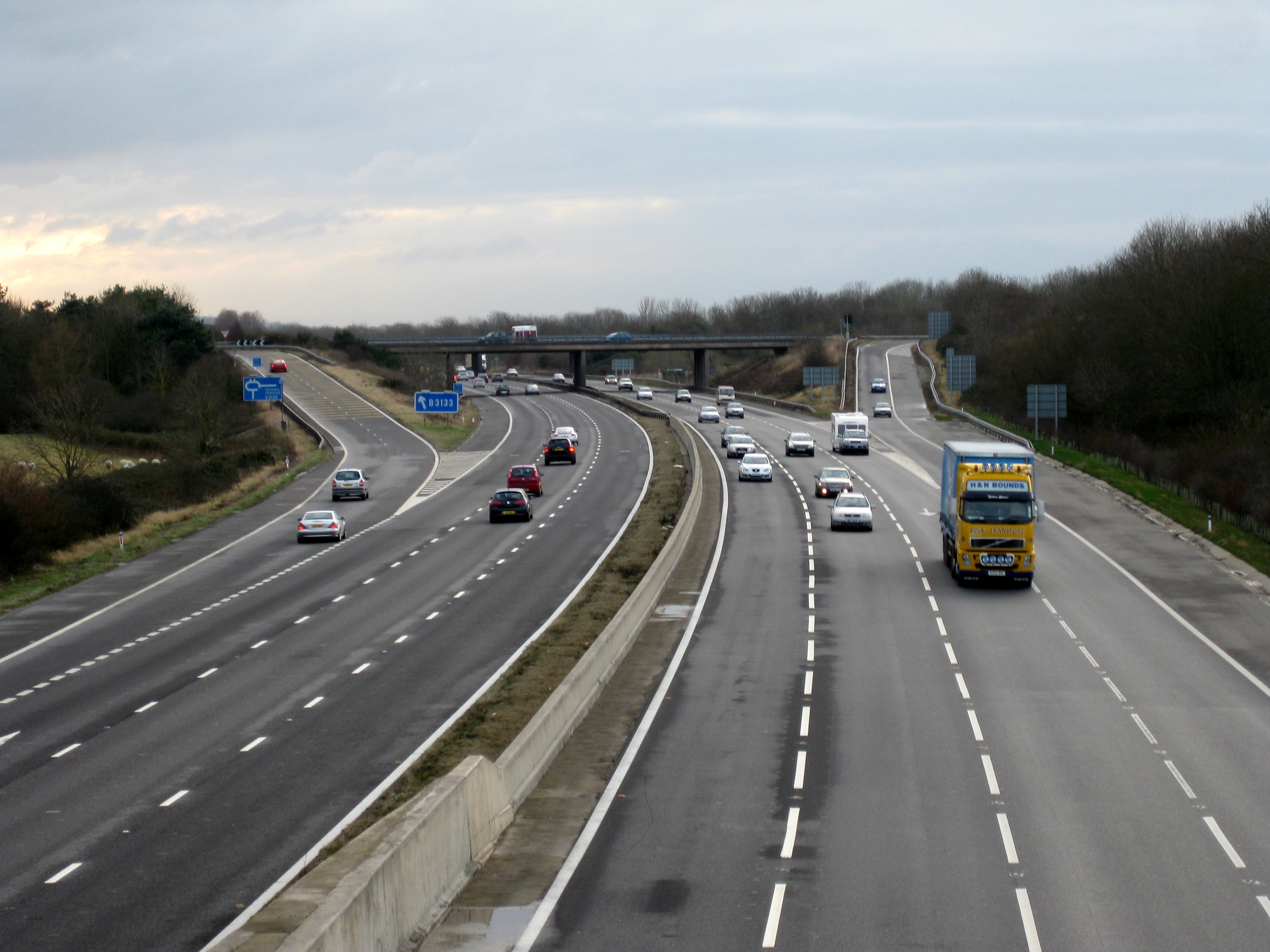
- Looking south towards junction 20, 2009

Route information
- Maintained by National Highways
- Length: 162.9 mi (262.2 km)
- Existed: 1962–present
- History: Opened: 1962; Completed: 1977

Major junctions
- Northeast end: West Bromwich
- M6 motorway; J4a → M42 motorway; J8 → M50 motorway; J15 → M4 motorway; J18a → M49 motorway
- Southwest end: Exminster

Location
- Country: United Kingdom
- Counties: West Midlands, Worcestershire, Gloucestershire, Bristol, Somerset, Devon
- Primary destinations: West Bromwich; Birmingham; Bromsgrove; Worcester; Cheltenham; Gloucester; Bristol; Weston-super-Mare; Bridgwater; Taunton; Exeter

Road network
- Roads in the United Kingdom; Motorways; A and B road zones

The M5 is a motorway in England. It runs south-west from the M6 at junction 8 (West Bromwich), north-west of Birmingham to Exeter in Devon. The M5 runs through Sandwell Valley and its early sections form part of the Birmingham Motorway Box, after which it passes Worcester, Cheltenham, and Gloucester. It intersects with the M4 motorway at Almondsbury Interchange north of Bristol, then serves Weston-super-Mare, Bridgwater, Taunton, and Tiverton, before terminating at junction 31 to the south of Exeter. At a total length of 163 miles (262 km), the M5 is the fourth-longest motorway in the UK.

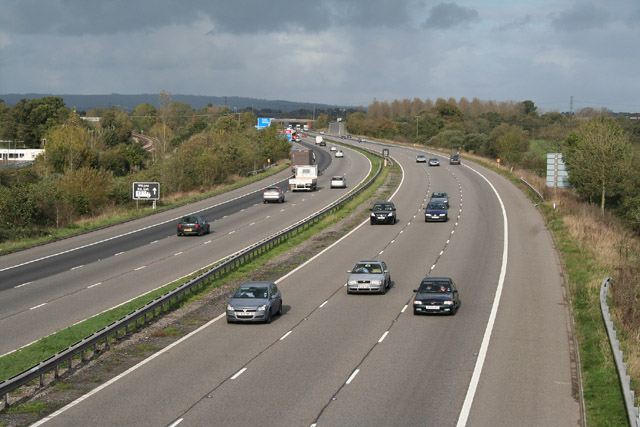
M5 near junction 28, Devon

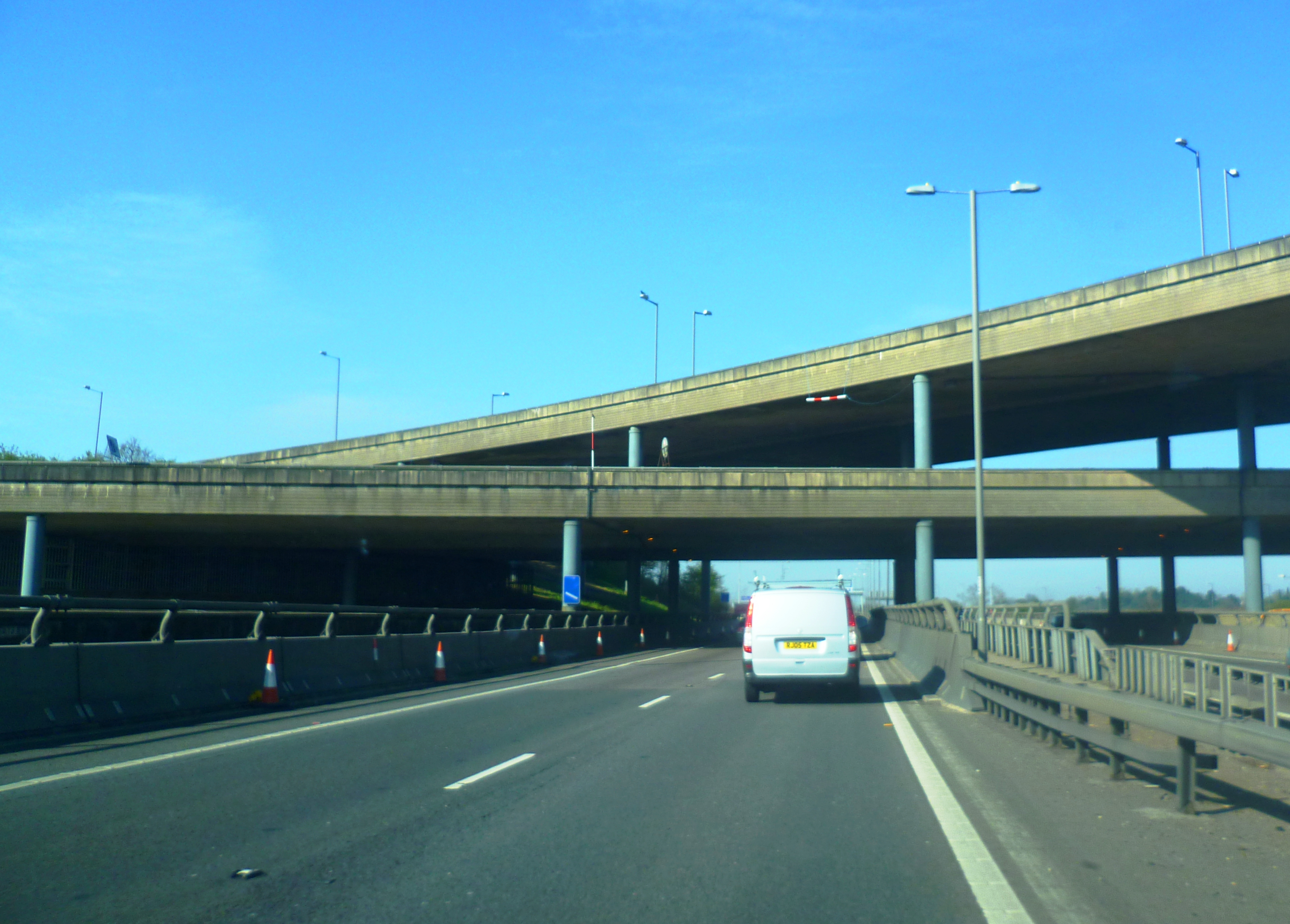
Almondsbury Interchange with the M4, photographed from the southbound carriageway

== Route ==
The M5 quite closely follows the route of the A38 road. The two deviate slightly around Bristol and the area south of Bristol from junctions 16 to the Sedgemoor services north of junction 22. The A38 goes straight through the centre of Bristol and passes by Bristol Airport, while the M5 skirts both, with access to the airport from junctions 18, 19 or 22. The A38 continues south into Devon from junction 31, near Exminster. Junction 15 of the M5 is a large four-level stack interchange, named the Almondsbury Interchange, where the M5 meets the M4. The Avonmouth Bridge, between junctions 18 and 19, is often a bottleneck during heavy traffic periods, due mainly to lane drops at either end of the bridge for the respective junctions, and the sharp angle in the centre of the bridge, which causes larger vehicles to slow considerably. There are split-level carriageways where the M5 ascends the hillsides above the Gordano Valley, between Portishead, junction 19 and Clevedon, junction 20. Between junction 21, Weston-super-Mare and junction 22, Burnham-on-Sea, the M5 passes by an isolated landmark hill called Brent Knoll and crosses the western end of the Mendip Hills. The Willow Man sculpture is visible from both carriageways, and acts as a landmark just to the south of junction 23, which as of 2021 had degraded and lost its head and arms.

== History ==
In the mid-1960s, the section north of Bristol was planned, predicted to be only two lanes in each direction.

In late June 1964, the extension to Edithmead was announced. The route would cross the Avon at a large viaduct at Bredon. This became the Birmingham – Bristol – East Brent motorway.

By 1964, the M5 was planned to go no further than East Brent (Brent Knoll). The Somerset county surveyor had written in his annual report in June 1964 that the motorway should be extended to go beyond Exeter. A route was designed around 1954. An official survey for a possible motorway beyond East Brent was carried out by Somerset from July 1964. On 3 April 1968, Barbara Castle announced the definite extension from Edithmead to Exeter, as a motorway. Before this date, this section to Exeter could have been simply modest upgrades of the A38.

When construction of the motorway reached Avonmouth in August 1969, the plan was to reach Edithmead by late 1972, and to reach Exeter by the mid-1970s.

=== Construction ===
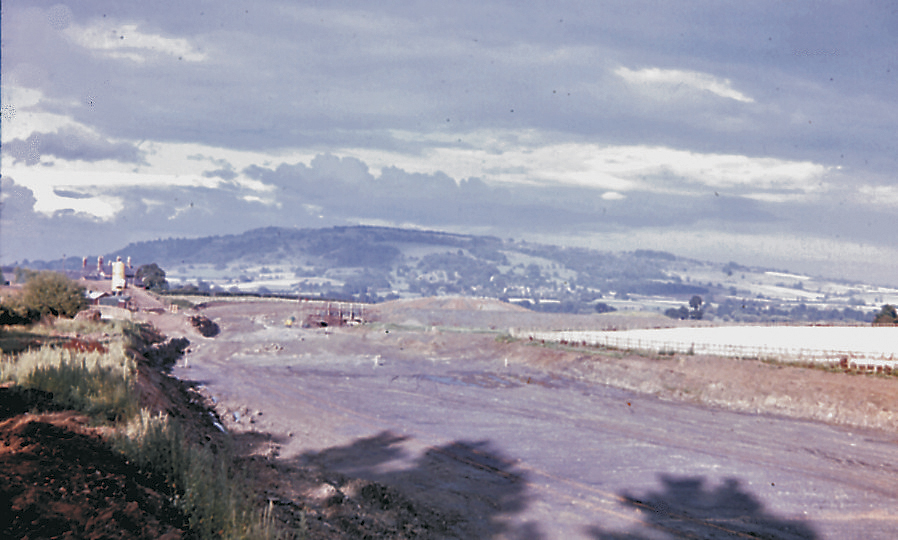
Construction in Worcestershire on 18 August 1960, at Fiddington, the M5/M50 trumpet junction, looking towards the 981ft Bredon Hill in the east

The first 26 miles (42 km) of the M5 motorway was constructed as a dual two-lane motorway with Worcestershire County Council acting as engineer. This section – from junction 4 (Lydiate Ash) in the north to a trumpet junction with the M50 in the south – opened in July 1962. The section was constructed by Monk, being 28 miles, from Lydiate Ash to the M50 junction 1, with the A38, at Brockeridge Common (Twyning).

This original section of the M5, from junctions 4 to 8, was widened to provide six lanes, by late June 1993, by the technique of 'parallel widening'. During this work, the northbound Strensham services were rebuilt further away from the modified M50 junction.

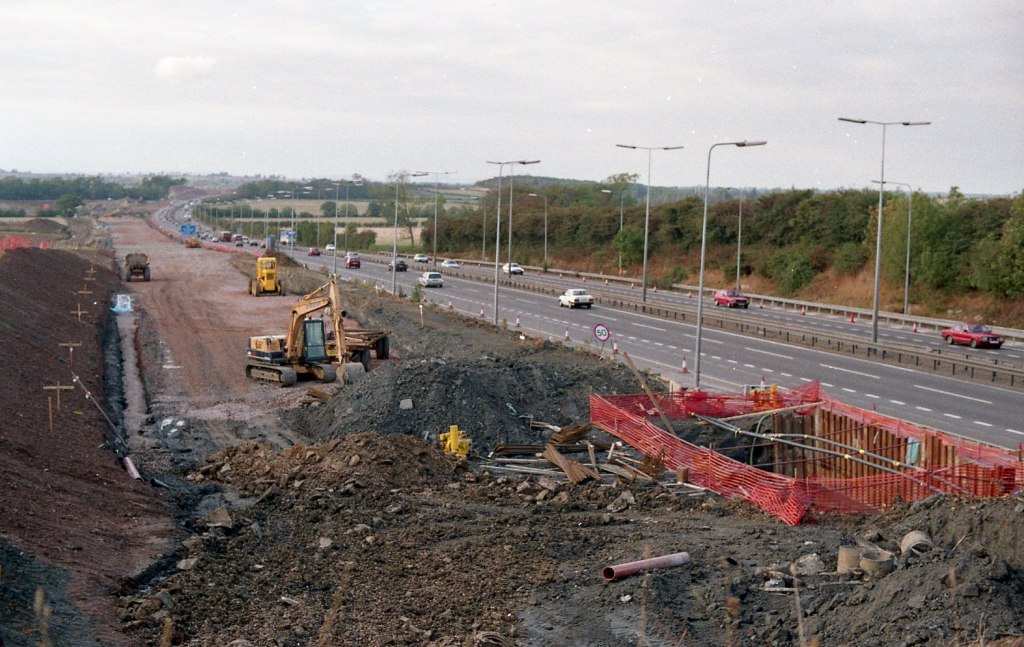
Widening at Strensham in September 1991

Worcestershire County Council, the police and particularly the county surveyor of Worcestershire had made repeated representations, in the late 1950s, that a dual three-lane standard motorway was appropriate. The Ministry of Transport insisted that a dual two-lane motorway would be built at a cost of around £8 million. The Motorways Archive also records that the carriageways were also built to a lower overall width of 88 feet (27 m) rather than 100 feet (30 m) to reduce the loss of agricultural land. When the decision became necessary to widen the Worcestershire section of M5, it cost £123 million.

The 2-mile (3.2 km) dual two-lane section between junctions 16 and 17 built at Filton, near Bristol, was also opened in 1962, and was intended to replace the pre-war Filton bypass. Gloucestershire County Council acted as engineer for this section, which was widened to a dual three-lane motorway in 1969.

North of junction 4 the M5 was constructed in sections, from 1967 to 1970, together with the Frankley services. Much of the northern section beyond junction 3, from about Oldbury to the junction with the M6 motorway, was constructed as an elevated dual three-lane motorway over Birmingham Canal (Old Main Line), Birmingham Canal (New Main Line), and Titford Pool using concrete pillars.

West Bromwich to Ray Hall (M6); the contract was given in June 1967 for £5,808,401, to take two and a half years. It was planned to open in January 1970, but would remain closed until May 1970, due to local traffic in Smethwick, and consultation with the local police.

Oldbury to West Bromwich was to open in May 1970, constructed by W. & C. French.

Quinton to Oldbury was planned to open in March 1970.

The M5 was also extended southwards, in sections, from 1967 to 1977, through Gloucestershire and Somerset, to Exeter in Devon as a dual three-lane motorway, together with the Strensham services.

Costain built the section from Bredon, Worcestershire, to Tredington, of 4.75 miles, of £3,392,392, with the contract awarded on 23 July 1968. It was to open in March 1970. In 1968, it was hoped to reach Edithmead, in Somerset, by the end of 1972, and Exeter by 1975. Concrete for the motorway junctions came from Beckford, Worcestershire.

Cementation and Leonard Fairclough built the section from Tredington, Gloucestershire to Brookthorpe-with-Whaddon, being £9,998,163, with the contract awarded on 25 April 1969, of 12.5 miles. Work started in May 1969.

Strensham to Piff's Elm was planned to open in May 1970, but there were defects in the asphalt, that had to be removed. It opened on Tuesday 16 June 1970, when the A38 through Tewkesbury was finally bypassed. Nicholas Ridley, Baron Ridley of Liddesdale, the Conservative candidate, and incumbent MP, for Cirencester and Tewkesbury gave a speech at the unofficial opening ceremony. Tewkesbury Borough Council had wanted an official opening ceremony, but this was prohibited by the Ministry of Transport as the purdah period was in force ahead of the 1970 General Election later that week. Nonetheless, the borough council arranged an opening ceremony, with a ceremonial motorcade. At the Ashchurch roundabout, Nicholas Ridley cut a white ribbon, and drove off in a 1911 Renault vehicle. The police escorted the unofficial impromptu motorcade off the motorway. Such an event had been restricted by the Ministry of Transport.

Sydney Green & Sons built the section from Brookthorpe (Junction 12, B4072) to Alkerton, Gloucestershire (Junction 14, A4096 Stroudwater Interchange), being 6.25 miles. Work started in late June 1969. The section opened on Tuesday 6 April 1971 at 12pm, with section north from A4019 Junction at Junction 10 Piff's Elm Interchange.

Central crash barriers were added to the Gloucestershire section in late 1973.

For the section north of Almondsbury, Kier had an office on Wickwar Road in Falfield. Kier had a £1.6m contract to build 19 bridges and structures.

The 'Filton Bypass' was a two-lane section built for Gloucestershire County Council, which was not built as the M5. Work began in May 1960, planned to take 15 months, built by Sydney Green & Sons. It opened on Friday 31 May 1963, and cost £500,000, from Cribbs Causeway to theAlmondsbury A38 roundabout, being two and a quarter miles. Widening began June 1966, costing £250,000, built by a consortium of Alfred McAlpine and Leonard Fairclough, with the contract awarded in May 1965.

Avonmouth to Cribbs Causeway was four and a quarter miles. The £3,673,429 contract was awarded in February 1967. Five miles opened on Thursday 28 August 1969, by a junior minister, costing £4.5m in total.

South of Avonmouth began on Tuesday 2 September 1969.

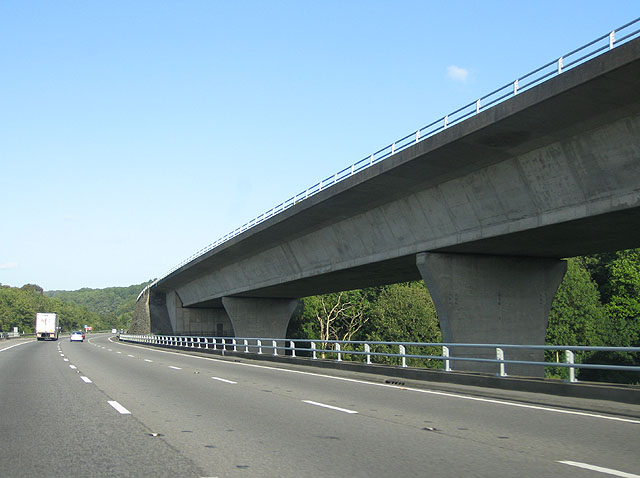
Wynhol Viaduct

The plan for Avonmouth to Clevedon, junctions 19 to 20, was displayed to public in March 1967, where the route ran along the scenic Gordano Valley.

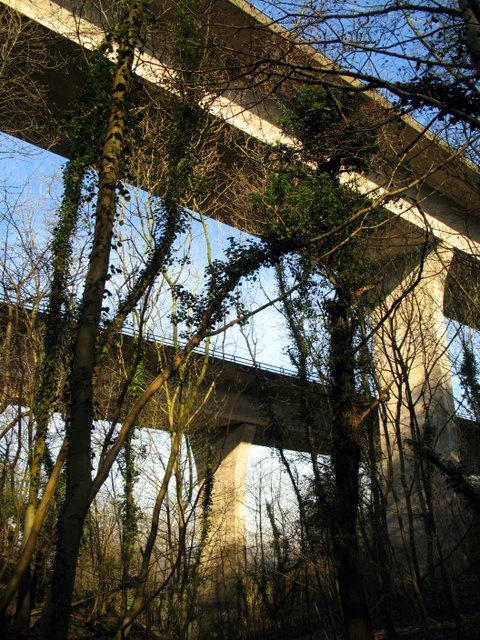
Elevated section

The Wynhol Viaduct, with 187ft spans, in Clapton in Gordano, was named after Wynhol Farm, which follows the Failand Ridge. The contract of £5.75m was awarded to Cementation Construction, who had a site office on Caswell Lane in Portbury, and another office at Clapton Wick.The Gordano Valley section opened on 25 January 1973.

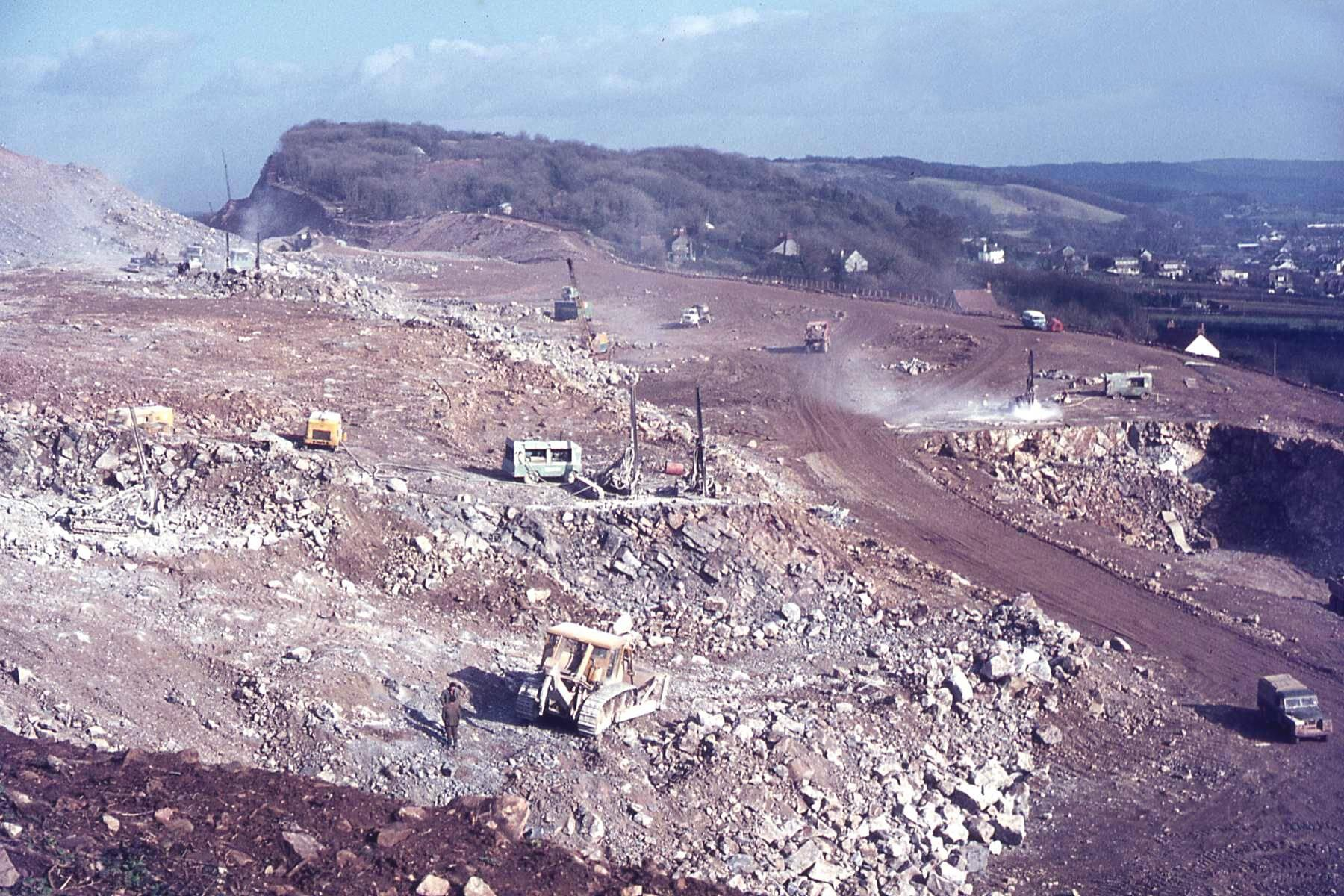
Rock blasting at Clevedon in February 1971

Rock blasting with explosives took place east of Clevedon in January 1970. Laing built the Clevedon Hills section.

In 1966 there was a proposal for a 'Bristol Spur' off the M5, to the Long Ashton bypass, to be built in 1968, to Clevedon. There was a public inquiry in 1966.

St Georges (Banwell) to Edithmead, junctions 21 to 22, was built through the western edge of the Mendip Hills. A E Farr, of Westbury in Wiltshire, part of Bovis, built the section, with the £8.5m contract awarded on 19 November 1969 for 8.7 miles.

Edithmead to Dunball (Brent Knoll) was built by W. & C. French, with the contract awarded in January 1971. The site office was at Puriton, where a Roman villa was discovered on 18 February 1971, so work stopped for a week, whilst the site was investigated.

Cementation Construction built the 4.9-mile section from Dunball (J23) to Huntworth (J24). Construction started in June 1971 and finished in December 1973, with the contract costing £5.26m. The 17-span Huntworth Viaduct, was a box girder bridge, built by Cleveland Bridge Engineering. It was the first box girder bridge in the UK after an enquiry in the early 1970s.

The public enquiry for the twenty four miles from North Petherton (Huntworth) to Willand, took place at Taunton on 15 September 1970, which was the main Somerset stretch of the M5. In May 1971 it was planned to bypass Taunton by 1974. The Huntworth to Willand route fixed in May 1971.

The section from Huntworth (J24) to Blackbrook, on the east of Taunton, (J25) was built by A. Monk Ltd, of Padgate, with a contract for £5,721,086 in May 1973 for seven miles. The southbound lane opened on Tuesday 4 November 1975, and the northbound lane opened on Tuesday 25 November 1975. But the motorway section was not legally a motorway for the first few weeks, as it was incomplete. The northbound lane was not fully finished until Easter 1976. Monk Ltd had asked for two extensions to the commercial contract, and some construction subcontractors had entered into liquidation.

The Blackbrook to Chelston section (the Taunton bypass from J25 to J26) was 6.9 miles. The £5,017,163 contract was awarded in 1972 to Cementation Construction with McGregor (Paving). Construction started in March 1972, and finished in April 1974,

The Chelston (Taunton) to Cullompton Twenty-mile section started in November 1973, being built by Tarmac. It was to finish by the end of 1976.

The northern section from Chelston to Sampford Peverell was the last eight-mile section to reach Exeter, being planned to open in late October 1976. The section would open on Thursday 21 October 1976, a month early.

The section from Sampford Peverell to Willand was three miles. The northbound side opened on Tuesday 6 July 1976 at 6am, and the southbound side opened on Thursday 8 July 1976 at 4pm, being five months early.

The short section between junctions 27 and 29 was built between 1967 and 1969, by Devon County Council, as the A38 Cullompton Bypass, with the intention that it should become part of the M5. The termini for this section have since been removed, although part of the southern terminal roundabout is now used as an emergency access. The section was developed to motorway standards, and incorporated into the M5 in 1975.

Around Exminster, the M5 was originally planned to demolish most of the north part of the village, taking 25 houses and the Stowey Arms pub. On 27 March 1972, it was decided re-route the motorway at a cost of £1m, as a deep cutting would need to be dug through a hill. The new route was announced in mid-September 1972. On Friday 27 May 1977, the final 3.5-mile (5.6 km) section from Sandy Gate to Pearce's Hill, at Exminster, opened. There was now 355 miles (571 km) to Carlisle, and 405 miles (652 km) of dual carriageway to Plymouth. The section was opened by the Prime Minister, Jim Callaghan.

=== Naming ===
When the initial English motorway system, including the now-M5, was being planned, no numbering system had been agreed. A 1958 Ministry of Transport and Civil Aviation memo suggested basing motorway numbers on the existing A road numbering scheme, suggesting that "M5" would be either the section of the London-Doncaster motorway (now the M1) south of Birmingham or the spur from it to Birmingham (now part of the M6), and that the Birmingham to Bristol motorway, now the M5, could be the M38. However, by 1959, the name M5 for the Birmingham to Bristol motorway had been agreed. Rather than take its number from the sector radiating from London, as would be the case for a non-motorway road, it formed (along with the Bristol Channel and the M6) the boundary of a new numbering sector for motorways.

=== Services ===
RAF Moreton Valence had a proposed service area in the late 1970s.

There was a proposal for service area in 1967 at Kingston Seymour, south of Clevedon.

Proposals were announced in September 2009 for a new Gloucester Services between junctions 11a and 12. A planning application was submitted in December 2009. Stroud District councillors approved the services in August 2010. The Services opened in May 2014

=== Operational history ===
Junction 1 surrounds a surviving gatehouse from the former Sandwell Hall. The section from junctions 16 and 18 was illuminated in about 1973 as part of a wider policy announced by Minister for Transport Industries, John Peyton, in 1972 to illuminate the 86 miles (138 km) of UK motorway particularly prone to fog.

In the late 1980s, junction 4a was built as part of the M42 motorway construction project. The route of the M42 was decided as early as 1972 but, owing to planning delays, the short section of the M42 north of Bromsgrove did not open until December 1989.

As the M5 traffic increased in the 1980s, junction 11, the main Gloucester and Cheltenham access (via the A40 Golden Valley by-pass) became increasingly congested. At the same time there were plans for large scale business and housing developments at Brockworth, near Gloucester. To relieve junction 11 of some of the new traffic generated, & avoid more congestion around both Cheltenham & Gloucester, a new junction, 11A, 3.5 miles (5.6 km) south of junction 11, was constructed and opened in the mid-1990s. A further feature of this junction was to create a new route from the south west Midlands to London and central southern England via the A417, A419 and the M4 at junction 15.

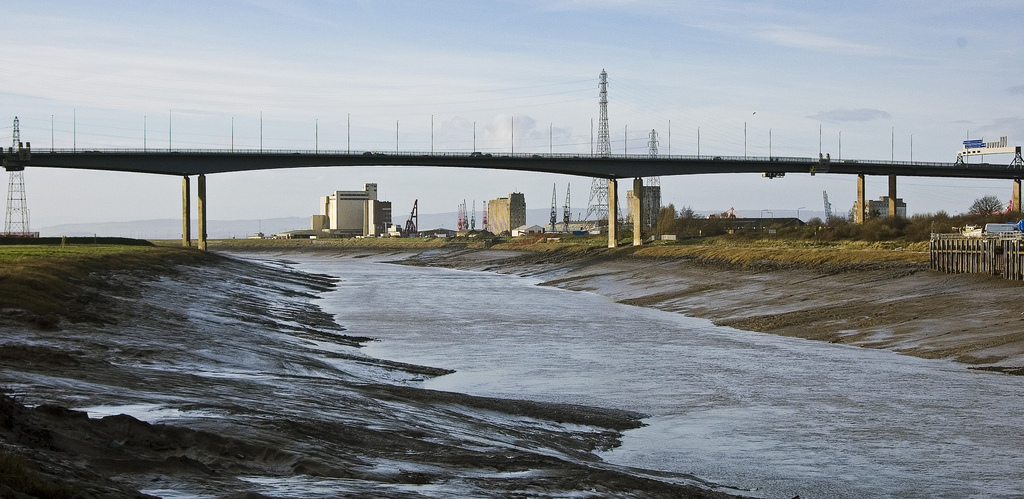
The Avonmouth Bridge, Bristol

The Avonmouth Bridge was converted to eight lanes (four lanes in each direction) in the early 2000s. Later, in 2005–2006, parts of the M5 between junctions 17 and 20 were widened to 7 lanes (four lanes climbing the hills and three lanes descending the hills); variable message signs were added and parts of the central reservation was converted to a concrete step barrier. During this stage of construction the M5 became Britain's longest contraflow system, spanning 9 miles (14 km) between junctions 19 and 20. The M5 contraflow was said to be the most complicated ever built in the UK as the motorway is on a split level around the steep hills of the Gordano Valley; meaning four lanes plus an additional emergency vehicle lane were squeezed into that section.

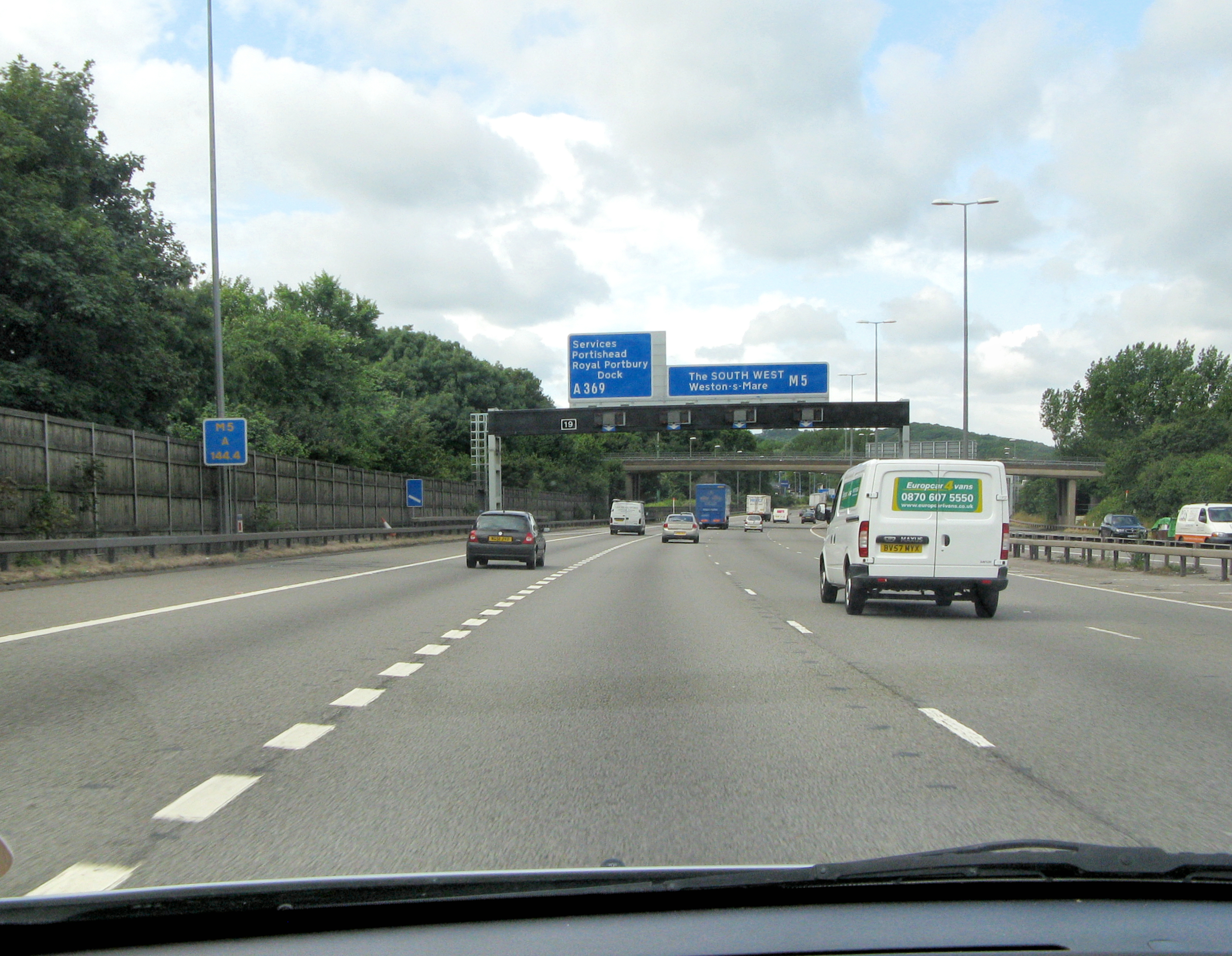
M5 motorway south of the Avonmouth Bridge

In 2002, extended exits for junction 12 were constructed. The Highways Agency did not anticipate the traffic flows through the junction and the resultant queues soon extended back onto the motorway.

The Cullompton services are signed on the motorway in the northbound direction only. This was implemented to reduce congestion at the low capacity junction, although there is still access available to the services southbound through the junction. Also, the northbound exit slip to the junction was reduced to one lane instead of two to reduce traffic on the small roundabout at the west side of the junction.

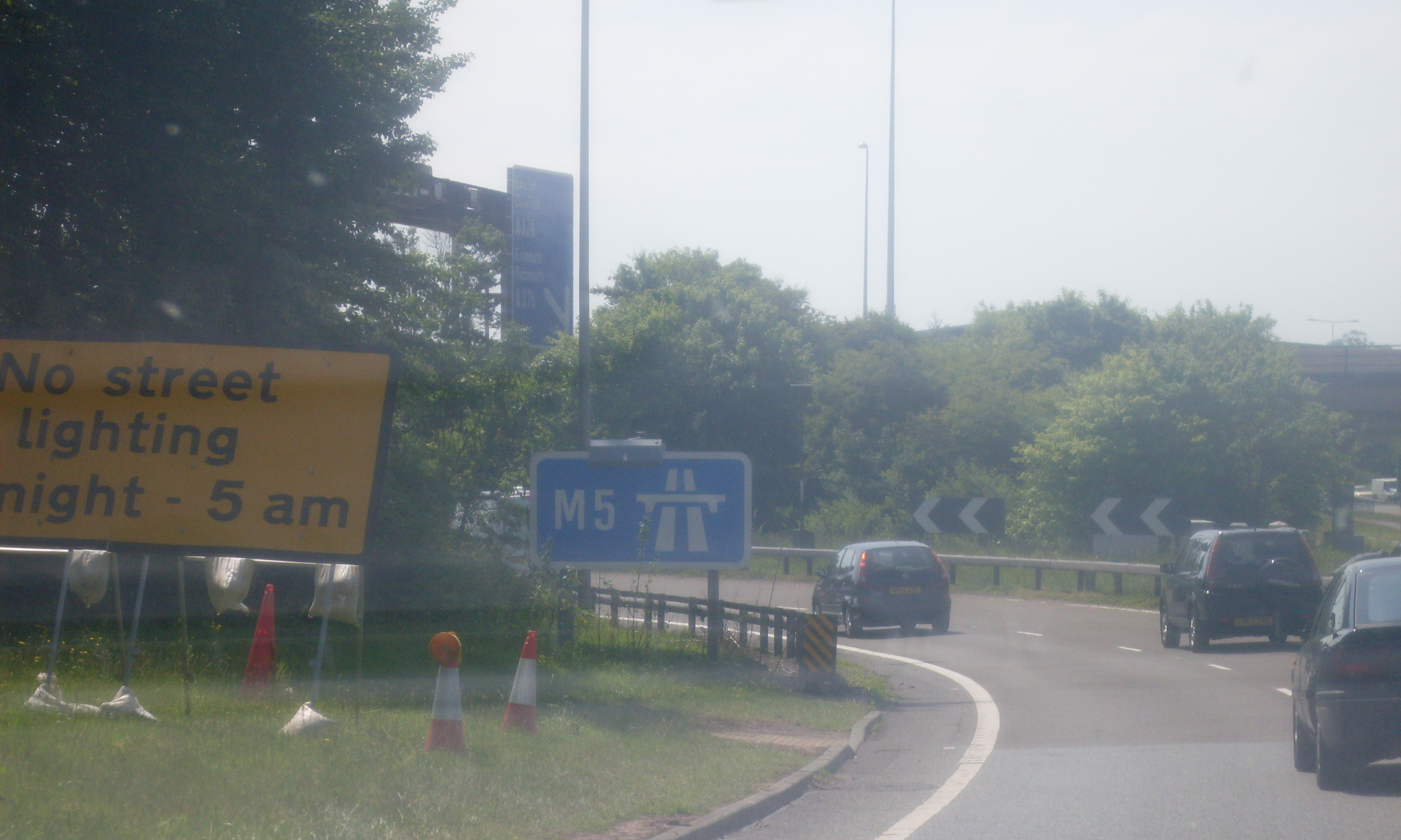
M5 entrance sign at junction 29 in Exeter

In 2009, it was announced that the lighting between junctions 30 and 31 would be turned off between midnight and 05:00 to save energy.

In September 2020, Highways England announced that the section between junctions 1 and 2 in the West Midlands will be one of four in England to have its speed limit reduced to 60 mph (97 km/h) in a bid to reduce high levels of atmospheric nitrogen dioxide in the particular area.

== Future developments ==
In 2020, it was announced that junction 10 would be undergoing significant roadworks as part of a redevelopment project on the A4019. The works will involve making the interchange full-access and dualling the A4019 east of the junction into Cheltenham. Works will commence in 2023 (subject to permission being granted) and be completed in 2024, according to the Gloucestershire County Council.

There have been suggestions that the Government extend the M5 south, to the city of Plymouth, which currently relies on the A38 road. The argument for such an extension has intensified in light of the closure of Plymouth City Airport in 2011, and the 2014 breaching of the South Devon Railway sea wall following storms that in turn, cut off Plymouth and Cornwall's rail access. However this would involve a number of reconstruction works including realignment where the current route of the A38 follows tight bends.

Improvements to junction 25 at Taunton were approved with an £18 million programme that will include the enlargement of the junction roundabout, the widening of the eastern junction slip road exit, and an additional roundabout southeast of the junction to provide access to a new business park and to a proposed bypass of the hamlet of Henlade.

It is proposed to restore the Lapal Canal by construction of a new canal tunnel under junction 3 of the motorway.

== Incidents and events ==
=== Discovery of bones ===
In October 2009, workmen clearing vegetation from the slip road at junction 14 discovered human bones in a black bin bag dumped in the bushes. The police were called soon after, and it was soon established that the bones were those of a young female. A few days later, DNA found on the remains confirmed that the body was that of Melanie Hall, a Bath hospital worker who disappeared in June 1996 after a night out in Bath, and who had been declared dead in absentia in 2004. Dental records confirmed that the body was hers, and the police began a formal investigation into her murder. As of 2016 no one has been prosecuted in connection with this case. Some keys were also discovered and the police contacted Ford to help them trace the vehicle.

=== 2011 multi-vehicle collision ===
On the evening of Friday 4 November 2011, seven people were killed and a further 51 injured in a major crash involving over 50 vehicles which included cars, vans and large goods vehicles near junction 25 in West Monkton, near Taunton. Several vehicles were burnt out in the fire which developed at the scene as the result of a series of explosions, and the road surface was seriously damaged, not just by the fire and explosions, but also by fuel spillage. The cause of the crash, which took place in wet foggy conditions close to a firework display, was investigated. One person was charged for breach under health and safety laws and found not guilty.

== Junctions ==
Data from driver location signs are used to provide distance and carriageway identifier information. Where both the start and end point of the junction are known, both have been included.

M5 motorway junctions
mile	km	North-east bound exits (B carriageway)	Junction	South-west bound exits (A carriageway)	Coordinates
0.0	0.0	London (M1, M40), Birmingham (N&E), The North West, Walsall, Wolverhampton M6	M6 J8	Start of motorway	52.5360°N 1.9699°W
2.7; 3.3	4.3; 5.3	West Bromwich, Birmingham (NW) A41	J1	West Bromwich, Sandwell, Birmingham (NW) A41	52.5119°N 1.9754°W
5.2; 5.8	8.4; 9.3	Dudley, Wolverhampton, Sandwell A4123	J2	Birmingham (W), Dudley A4123	52.4927°N 2.0188°W
8.6; 9.0	13.8; 14.5	Birmingham (W&C) A456	J3	Kidderminster A456	52.4491°N 2.0152°W
		Entering West Midlands		Entering Worcestershire	52.4329°N 2.0175°W
		Frankley services	Services	Frankley services	52.4292°N 2.0179°W
14.0; 14.4	22.5; 23.2	Birmingham (SW) A38, Stourbridge A491	J4	Birmingham (SW), Bromsgrove A38	52.3786°N 2.0465°W
16.1	25.9	End of variable speed limit	J4A	London (M40), National Exhibition Centre, Birmingham M42	52.3543°N 2.0711°W
16.6	26.7	The North East, National Exhibition Centre, Birmingham M42	J4A	Start of variable speed limit	52.3543°N 2.0711°W
21.4; 21.7	34.5; 35.0	Bromsgrove, Droitwich A38	J5	Droitwich A38	52.2876°N 2.1202°W
27.0; 27.5	43.5; 44.2	Worcester (N), Kidderminster A449	J6	Worcester (N) A449, Evesham A4538	52.2128°N 2.1579°W
		Start of variable speed limit	J6	End of variable speed limit	52.2128°N 2.1579°W
30.2; 30.7	48.6; 49.4	Worcester (S), Evesham A44	J7	Worcester (S) A44	52.1687°N 2.1803°W
		Strensham services (northbound)	Services	No access	52.0652°N 2.1577°W
		No access	Services	Strensham services (southbound)	52.0574°N 2.1426°W
39.7	63.9	Entering Worcestershire	J8	South Wales, Ross M50	52.0478°N 2.1356°W
40.0	64.4	South Wales, Ross M50	J8	Entering Gloucestershire	52.0478°N 2.1356°W
		Entering Gloucestershire		River Avon	52.0307°N 2.1255°W
		River Avon		Entering Worcestershire	52.0307°N 2.1255°W
		Entering Worcestershire		Entering Gloucestershire	52.0113°N 2.1211°W
43.4; 43.9	69.8; 70.6	Tewkesbury A438, Evesham A46	J9	Evesham A46, Tewkesbury A438	51.9965°N 2.1237°W
48.3; 48.5	77.7; 78.0	No access (on-slip only)	J10	Cheltenham A4019	51.9290°N 2.1400°W
51.0; 51.4	82.1; 82.8	Gloucester (North & East), Cheltenham A40	J11	Cheltenham, Gloucester (North & East), Staverton A40	51.8897°N 2.1514°W
53.4; 54.0	85.9; 86.9	Gloucester (West), Cirencester A417	J11A	Gloucester (West), London, Swindon, Cirencester A417	51.8578°N 2.1735°W
		Gloucester services	Services	Gloucester services	51.8621°N 2.1667°W
60.2; 60.5	96.9; 97.4	Gloucester (Central & South) (A38)	J12	Gloucester (Central & South) (A38)	51.7982°N 2.2889°W
63.3; 63.7	101.8; 102.5	Stroud A419	J13	Stroud, Dursley A419	51.7598°N 2.3227°W
71.9	115.7	Michaelwood services	Services	Michaelwood services	51.6567°N 2.4292°W
		Entering Gloucestershire		Entering South Gloucestershire	
73.6; 73.9	118.4; 119.0	Dursley B4509	J14	Thornbury B4509	51.6368°N 2.4521°W
		End of variable speed limit	J15 Almondsbury Interchange	Start of variable speed limit	51.5514°N 2.5524°W
81.1; 81.7	130.5; 131.5	South Wales, Chepstow, Newport, Cardiff (M48) M4(W); London, Swindon, Bath, Bristol (C) M4(E)	J15 Almondsbury Interchange	London, Swindon, Bath, Bristol (C) (M32) M4(E); South Wales, Chepstow, Newport, Cardiff (M48) M4(W)	51.5514°N 2.5524°W
82.0; 82.3	132.0; 132.5	Thornbury, Filton A38	J16	Thornbury, Filton A38	51.5472°N 2.5684°W
84.2; 84.6	135.5; 136.2	Bristol (W), Cribbs Causeway A4018	J17	Bristol (W), Cribbs Causeway A4018	51.5286°N 2.6102°W
		Start of variable speed limit	J17	End of variable speed limit	51.5286°N 2.6102°W
		Entering South Gloucestershire		Entering Bristol	51.5130°N 2.6521°W
87.4; 87.7	140.6; 141.2	South Wales, Cardiff, Newport M49 (M4(W))	J18A	No access (on-slip only)	51.5021°N 2.6740°W
88.0; 88.2	141.6; 142.0	Bristol, Bristol, Shirehampton, Avonmouth, Docks A4, Aust (A403)	J18	Avonmouth, Bristol (West), Bristol A4	51.5026°N 2.6728°W
		Entering Bristol		Avonmouth Bridge	51.4890°N 2.6928°W
		Avonmouth Bridge		Entering Somerset	51.4890°N 2.6928°W
90.1	145.0	Clifton (Toll), Portishead, Royal Portbury Dock A369; Gordano services	J19; Services	Portishead, Royal Portbury Dock A369; Gordano services	51.4774°N 2.7117°W
96.7	155.6	Clevedon, Nailsea B3133	J20	Clevedon, Nailsea B3133	51.4322°N 2.8387°W
		Blind Yeo			51.4263°N 2.8435°W
102.3	164.6	Weston-super-Mare, Bristol (South) A370	J21	Weston-super-Mare A370	51.3589°N 2.8936°W
		River Axe			51.2907°N 2.8974°W
109.1	175.6	Sedgemoor services	Services	Sedgemoor services	51.2689°N 2.9214°W
111.7	179.8	Weston-super-Mare, Burnham-on-Sea, Bristol (South), Bristol, A38	J22	Highbridge, Burnham-on-Sea A38	51.2360°N 2.9467°W
		River Brue			51.2136°N 2.9629°W
		Huntspill River			51.1941°N 2.9708°W
116.9	188.1	Highbridge (A38), Glastonbury, Wells A39	J23	Bridgwater (A38), Minehead, Glastonbury, Wells A39	51.1670°N 2.9809°W
		King's Sedgemoor Drain			51.1639°N 2.9814°W
		River Parrett			51.1150°N 2.9793°W
121.8; 122.0	196.0; 196.3	Bridgwater, Minehead A38; Bridgwater services	J24; Services	Minehead (A39); Bridgwater services	51.1019°N 2.9940°W
		River Tone			51.0230°N 3.0578°W
128.4; 128.6	206.7; 206.9	Taunton, Yeovil A358	J25	Taunton, Honiton, Yeovil, Weymouth A358	51.0178°N 3.0636°W
133.3	214.5	Taunton Deane services	Services	Taunton Deane services	50.9769°N 3.1468°W
135.3; 135.5	217.8; 218.0	Wellington, Taunton A38	J26	Wellington A38	50.9730°N 3.1914°W
		Entering Somerset		Entering Devon	50.9495°N 3.2737°W
143.4; 143.7	230.7; 231.3	Barnstaple, Tiverton A361, Wellington A38	J27	Tiverton, Barnstaple A361	50.9177°N 3.3566°W
147.6; 147.9	237.5; 238.0	Cullompton B3181; Cullompton services	J28; Services	Honiton A373, Cullompton B3181	50.8609°N 3.3838°W
157.7; 158.1	253.8; 254.4	Honiton, Exeter A30	J29	Honiton A30 (East), Exeter	50.7288°N 3.4624°W
158.9; 159.3	255.7; 256.3	Exeter A379, Exmouth A376, Sidmouth (A3052); Exeter services	J30; Services	Dawlish, Exeter A379, Sidmouth, Exmouth A376; Exeter services	50.7124°N 3.4638°W
162.4; 162.6	261.4; 261.7	Start of motorway	J31	Truro, Bodmin, Okehampton A30	50.6801°N 3.5166°W
162.7	261.8	Okehampton A30 (West), Exeter (A377); Non-motorway traffic	J31	End of motorway Road continues as A38 towards Plymouth, Torquay	50.6780°N 3.5228°W
1.000 mi = 1.609 km; 1.000 km = 0.621 mi Junction information gathered from Advanced Direction Signs March to June 2011 (J4A – J31), all updated as of August 2020. Coordinates from Google Maps, taken at the approximate centre of the junction

== Cultural references ==
M5#1 is a song from the 1994 album Middle Class Revolt by post-punk band The Fall which uses the M5 to describe reverting to a romanticised agricultural past that never really existed.

== See also ==
- List of motorways in the United Kingdom
