= Scammonden Bridge =

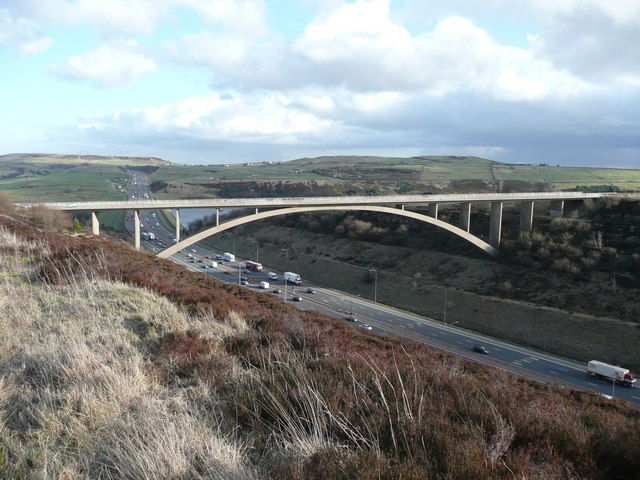
- View east towards the reservoir
- Coordinates: 53.6477°N 1.9310°W
- Carries: B6144 road
- Crosses: M62 motorway
- Locale: Kirklees
- Maintained by: National Highways

Characteristics
- Design: Open spandrel fixed-arch
- Material: Reinforced concrete
- Total length: 656 ft (200 m)
- Width: 24 ft (7.3 m)
- Height: 120 ft (37 m)
- Longest span: 410 ft (120 m)
- No. of spans: 1

History
- Designer: Colonel Stuart Maynard Lovell
- Constructed by: Sir Alfred McAlpine
- Construction start: January 1967
- Opened: 18 May 1970
- Inaugurated: 14 October 1971

Location
- Interactive map of Scammonden Bridge

Scammonden Bridge, also known locally as the Brown Cow Bridge (after the nearby Brown Cow Inn, now closed), spans the Deanhead cutting carrying the B6114 (the former A6025) Elland to Buckstones road over the M62 motorway in Kirklees, West Yorkshire, England. The bridge and Scammonden Reservoir to the west are named after Scammonden, the village that was flooded to accommodate the reservoir whose dam carries the motorway. On opening, the bridge was the longest concrete arch bridge in the UK.

== History ==
The bridge was built for the West Riding County Council to the designs of the county surveyor, Colonel S. Maynard Lovell. In March 1962 a model of the 37-mile (60 km) section of the M62 was displayed in Wakefield, the administrative centre of the West Riding County Council. The route of the motorway, from the A572 to the A640 at Huddersfield, was announced by Tom Fraser on 29 October 1964.

On opening, it was believed to be one of the largest concrete single spans in Europe.

The bridge had high winds; pedestrians found it sometimes hard to walk along it, so a new type of road sign, for high winds, was installed.

The £8m contract was given in late October 1966.

=== Design ===
The bridge was planned as a flat arch bridge, but aerodynamic considerations led to an open spandrel design. The main span supports eight spandrel columns and there are four other columns over the motorway cutting. The spandrel columns are 18 inches (46 cm) thick.

The arch is a twin box section. Its deck is an inverted T-type pretensioned prestressed concrete beam. The bridge deck is 24 feet (7.3 m) wide. Using computers, its design was calculated to withstand 110 mph (180 km/h; 49 m/s) winds, and was tested in wind tunnels at the University of Nottingham and the National Physical Laboratory. The motorway cutting was profiled with 15-foot (4.6 m) 'steps'.

The road it carried was the A6025, but is now the B6114 between Elland and the A640 junction at Buckstones Moss. To the west of the bridge the M62 enters Calderdale from Kirklees; the boundary crosses the B6114 north of the bridge, and follows the north side of the M62 along Scammonden Water. The road crosses the M62 at around 1,017 feet (310 m) above sea level, northeast of Cow Gate Hill.

=== Opening ===
It opened to traffic on Monday 18 May 1970 by Major Bruce Eccles. Huddersfield Transport ran buses to see the bridge.

=== Safety improvements ===
In 2020 work was carried out to erect permanent, 8 feet (2.4 m) high, inward curving anti-climb fencing on both sides of the bridge, following a number of deaths, in order to prevent suicides. Work began in June, nearly a year after Highways England confirmed they had secured the £1m required to design and build the new structures. The scheme was completed in October 2020.

== Construction ==
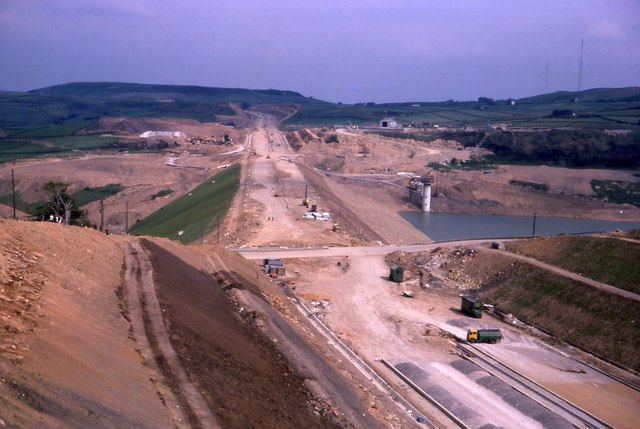
Motorway under construction, below Pole Moor, in 1970

The arch is made of modular precast concrete sections, weighing 9,000 tonnes (8,900 long tons). The construction contractor was Alfred McAlpine. Construction of the arch required 70 miles (110 km) of scaffolding tubing. During the winter there was severe ice build up on the scaffolding.

A fifty ton drilling rig began construction in early January 1967. Explosions would move 200 tons of rock, at a time. There was heavy rain in the middle of May 1967. 38 Ruston-Bucyrus excavators worked on the project; McAlpine had bought 23 excavators in March 1967 for £400,000. It was the largest single excavation for a British motorway. Gravel came from Scout Quarry at Edenfield in Lancashire.

It was deepest motorway excavation in Europe. Richard Marsh, Baron Marsh, the transport minister, visited on Friday 2 May 1969. Many sightseers came to see the bridge being built, often at weekends.

Excavation of the Deanhead cutting was done using explosives; 12,000,000 cubic yards were excavated. The cutting is 150 feet (46 m) deep, 2,600 feet (790 m) long, and 4.6 million cubic yards (3,500,000 m^{3}) of earth was removed during its construction. Most of it was used to build the 249-foot (76 m) high Scammonden Dam across the Black Brook valley, which was the first motorway-dam project in the world.

The route of the carriageway was set out in July 1963 and the motorway cutting began work in August 1964. Work on the six-mile Windy Hill to Pole Moor section began on 1 November 1966 and was carried out for 12 hours on weekdays and eight hours at weekends.

== County surveyor ==
Stuart Maynard Lovell was awarded the CBE in the 1964 Birthday Honours. He came from Somerset, attending Cheddar Council School and Sexey's Grammar School near Wedmore, and had worked for the county council before the war, at Flax Bourton. In 1934 he had been commissioned into the 205th (Wessex) Field Company of the 1st Somersetshire Engineers, part of the 43rd (Wessex) Infantry Division, itself disbanded in 1967.

His father John was a surveyor with Axbridge Rural District from Cheddar, Somerset. By 1935 Stuart Lovell was a 2nd Lt, and a Lt in 1936.

He married on 4 January 1937, moving to Backwell, as the district surveyor of Long Ashton Rural District In August 1943, when serving in North Africa, his 66 year old father died, so Major Lovell could not attend his father's funeral. His father, John, had briefly served in the Cheddar Home Guard. After serving in Italy in the war, he was now a Lt-Col, and a Col by the mid-1950s.

He was later a Conservative county councillor from April 1973, of Axbridge, for Avon County Council, living in Winscombe, he died aged 74 in October 1984.

== See also ==
- List of bridges in the United Kingdom
- List of longest arch bridge spans
- List of longest masonry arch bridge spans
- The M2 Medway Viaduct, the largest pre-stressed concrete bridge in Europe, when it opened in July 1963
