= Membury =

Membury may refer to:

- Membury, Devon, a village in Devon
  - Membury Castle, an Iron Age hillfort situated above the village of Membury, Devon
- RAF Membury, a former World War II airfield built in the civil parish of Lambourn, Berkshire
  - Membury services, a service station on the M4 motorway on the original site of the RAF Membury
    - Membury transmitting station, a broadcasting and telecommunications facility at Membury services
  - Membury Camp, an Iron Age hillfort situated next to RAF Membury, and on the borders of Wiltshire and Berkshire
