= Pole Moor =

Coordinates: 53.639°N 1.902°W

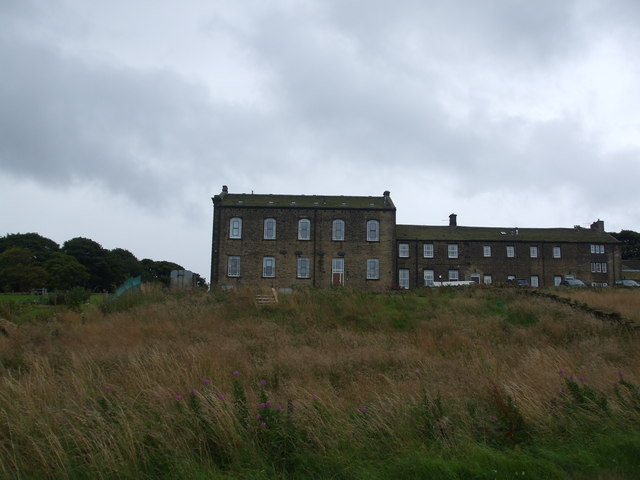
- Pole Moor Baptist Chapel

- Location within West Yorkshire
- OS grid reference: SE065155
- Metropolitan borough: Kirklees
- Metropolitan county: West Yorkshire
- Region: Yorkshire and the Humber
- Country: England
- Sovereign state: United Kingdom
- Post town: HUDDERSFIELD
- Postcode district: HD3
- Dialling code: 01484
- Police: West Yorkshire
- Fire: West Yorkshire
- Ambulance: Yorkshire
- UK Parliament: Colne Valley

Pole Moor is a hamlet between Outlane and Scammonden in Kirklees, England. It is situated on a high moorland plateau between Slaithwaite and Wholestone Moors in the South Pennines.

== History ==
At the start of the Industrial Revolution the inhabitants were woollen weavers. When the Earl of Dartmouth objected to a chapel being built on his land at Slaithwaite, the Baptists built their chapel on the edge of Worts Hill in 1790. After closing in 1992, the chapel, Sunday school and an adjoining late-19th century warehouse were converted into housing and are Grade II listed buildings.

The Huddersfield to Rochdale turnpike road of 1806, the A640 passes over Pole Moor where there was an inn, the Royal George, and where several pack horse routes crossed, including one from Halifax to Marsden and on to Lancashire.

== Geography ==
Scammonden Reservoir in the Deanhead Valley is to the west, the M62 motorway passes to the north and to the south 700 feet (210 m) below Moorside Edge is Slaithwaite in the Colne Valley. Moorside Edge medium wave radio transmitter's antenna are located at 340 metres (1,120 ft) OD on the moor. An old bridle way passed over the moor to Scammonden at Worts Hill to the west.

== Inns ==
Among the hamlet's public houses were the Lower Royal George and the Upper Royal George which was built in 1457 as the Royal George Inn and renamed the Jack O' Mitre in the 1980s. The Sun Inn was demolished. The Nont Sarah Hotel is being refurbished as a community hub.

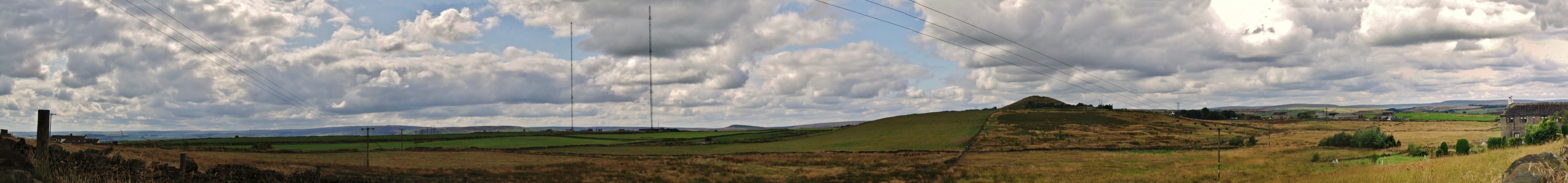
Panorama of Pole Moor showing the Moorside Edge (MW) transmitters and Worts Hill to the left of the hamlet
