= Stott Hall Farm =

Farm between carriageways of a motorway

Coordinates: 53.641°N 1.952°W

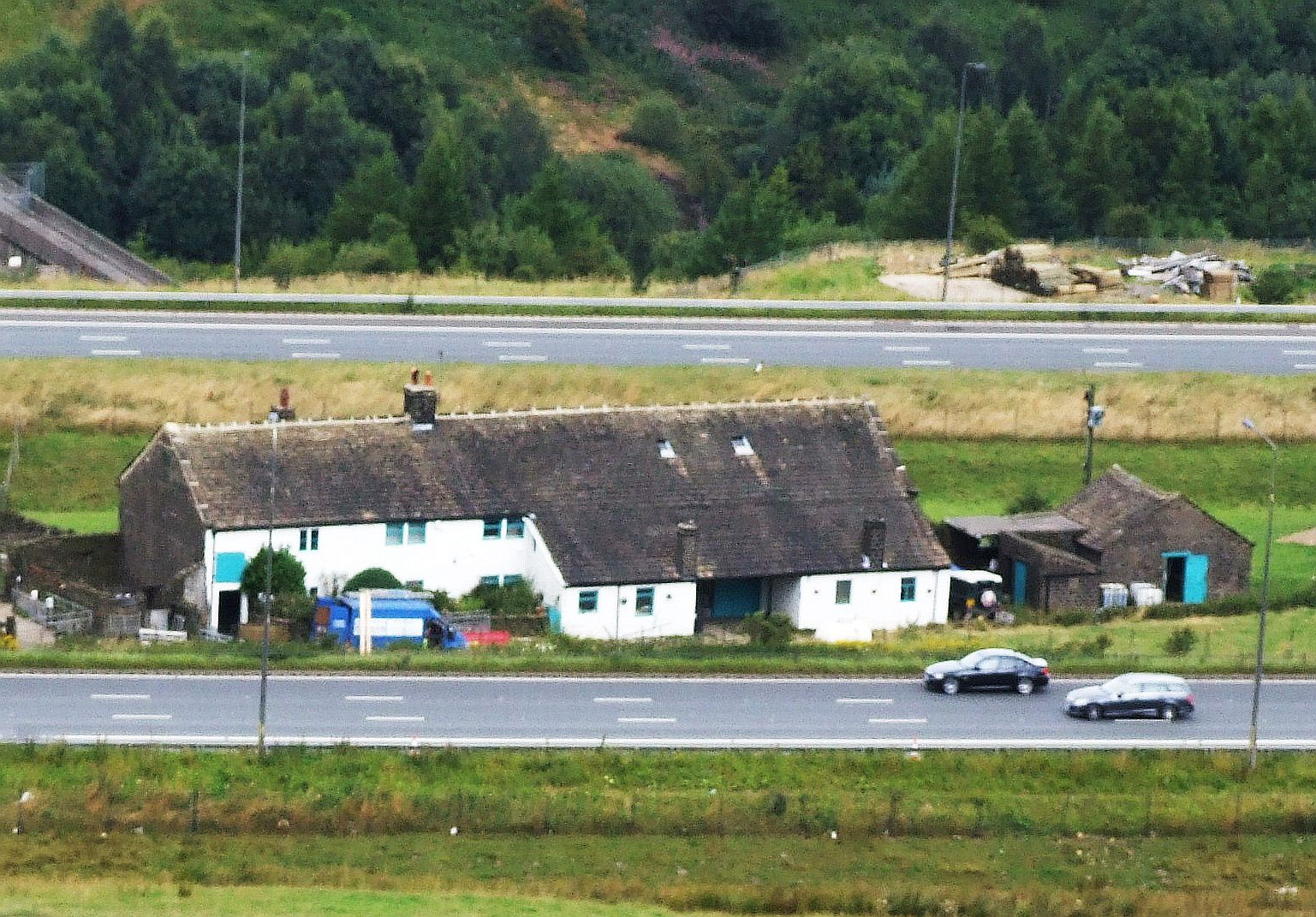
Stott Hall Farm, viewed from moorland above westbound carriageway of the M62 motorway

Stott Hall Farm is located between the eastbound and westbound carriageways of the M62 motorway in Calderdale, England. The eighteenth century farmhouse was located on unfavourable terrain for construction, and so the motorway separates around it. As the only farm in the UK situated in the middle of a motorway, the area has been a point of public interest.

== Site ==
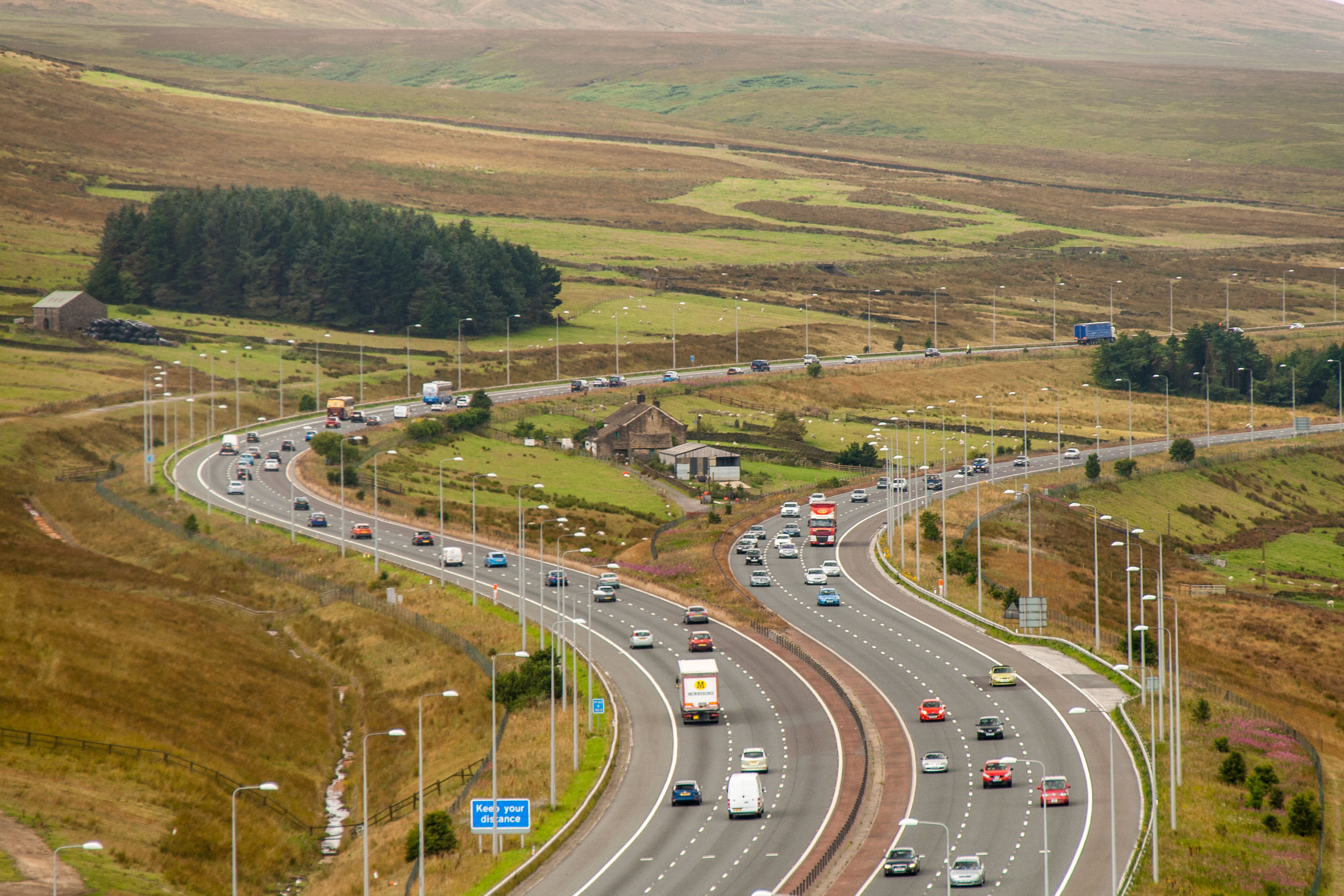
A view of the land enclosed by the motorway

The farm is situated in the centre division of the M62, in an area where the two directions separate for approximately 0.75 miles (1.21 km). The terrain is largely rough pastureland. It is separated from the motorway by crash barriers and a fence to keep livestock in and prevent out-of-control vehicles crashing onto the property. Although the farmhouse itself is about only 30 metres (98 ft) from the motorway, joining the motorway requires a drive of some 3.7 miles (6.0 km) via the A672. Despite its location in the middle of the motorway, the farm is home to a range of bird species including merlins, snipes and twites.

== History ==
The farm was built in 1737 on Moss Moor, south of Booth Wood Reservoir. During the construction of that section of the motorway, which took place from 1968 to 1971, it became apparent that the terrain was unsuitable for both directions to remain adjacent, as there was no area of land wide and level enough to allow it. Some attempts to landscape the area resulted in minor landslips. As a result the road was divided between the Windy Hill and Deanhead cuttings, which coincidentally led to the farm being retained along with several acres of its land. Underpass tunnels needed to be cut anyway for use by the Calderdale Water Board and these provided access to the farm.

A myth persists that the motorway was split because the inhabitants, Ken and Beth Wild, refused to sell the farm. However, the farm was actually owned by Calderdale Water Board at the time the M62 was built. In 1974 Calderdale was merged into Yorkshire Water, which is the current owner of the site. Since 1992 it has been worked by local farmer Paul Thorp, who moved into the property in 2008 with his family. In 2017 Yorkshire Water announced an environmental project to restore part of the site to peat bog.

== In popular culture ==
Stott Hall Farm was the subject of a BBC Radio 4 documentary, a 1983 Yorkshire Television documentary and a short film in 2008. It is referenced, though not by name, in the John Shuttleworth song titled "The Man Who Lives on the M62". Sally Boazman, BBC Radio 2's traffic reporter, and CB radio users nicknamed it the Little House on the Prairie.

In a 2007 list compiled from a survey of 1,000 UK motorists, it was one of the ten best-known sights on the motorway network.
