= Black Brook, West Yorkshire =

River in West Yorkshire, England

Coordinates: 53.661°N 1.900°W

The Black Brook is a small river in Calderdale, West Yorkshire, England.

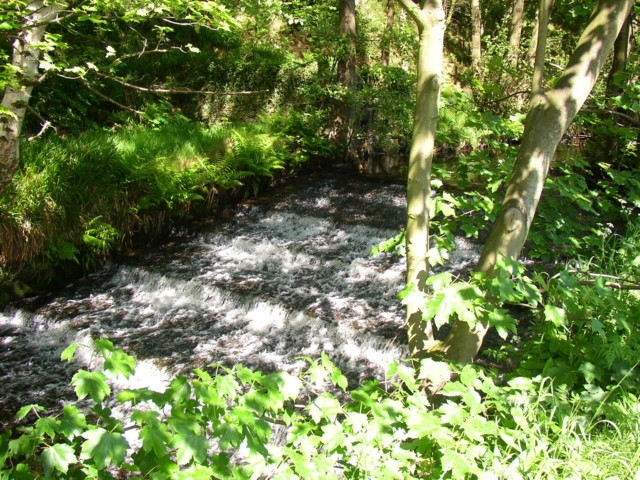
Cascade on the water near Stainland Board Mills

The Black Brook rises near the border of Calderdale and Kirklees next to Scammonden Dam. It flows downwards through Stainland Dean, and then between Greetland and Stainland. Most of the river, at this point, forms a parish border between the parishes of Greetland and Stainland. The Holywell Brook flows into the Black Brook before flowing into the River Calder at West Vale. The combined length of the two brooks is 8.85 miles (14.24 km) and they drain an area of 12 square miles (30 km^{2}).

The valley that the Black Brook flows through is named the Blackburne Valley.

== See also ==
- Rivers of the United Kingdom
