= Scammonden =

Village in West Yorkshire, England

Coordinates: 53.647°N 1.912°W

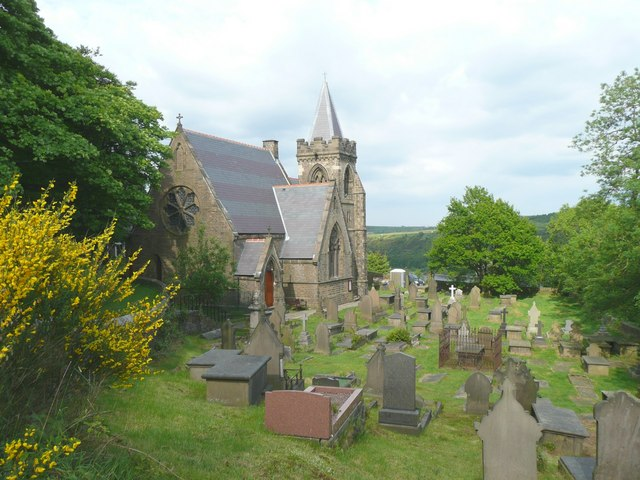
- St Bartholomew's Church, Dean Head, Scammonden

- Location within West Yorkshire
- OS grid reference: SE045155
- Metropolitan borough: Kirklees
- Metropolitan county: West Yorkshire
- Region: Yorkshire and the Humber
- Country: England
- Sovereign state: United Kingdom
- Post town: HUDDERSFIELD
- Postcode district: HD3
- Post town: HALIFAX
- Postcode district: HX4
- Dialling code: 01484; 01422
- Police: West Yorkshire
- Fire: West Yorkshire
- Ambulance: Yorkshire
- UK Parliament: Colne Valley

Scammonden or Dean Head was a village close to Huddersfield, in the Dean Head Valley, England, before the valley was flooded to create Scammonden Reservoir in the 1960s. The M62 motorway crosses the dam wall and then passes through a cutting to the west over which Scammonden Bridge carries the B6114. The Chapel of St Bartholomew still exists, as does the old vicarage, which is now home to Scammonden Sailing Club.

== History ==
Historically in the West Riding of Yorkshire, Scammonden or Dean Head was a township and chapelry in Huddersfield parish covering more than 2,000 acres. In the 1870s it had a church, a Baptist chapel, a national school, a post office and 190 houses. Industry in the village included cotton-spinning and woollen manufacture and there were freestone quarries. In 1866 Scammonden became a separate civil parish, on 1 April 1937 the parish was abolished to form Colne Valley. In 1931 the parish had a population of 394. The area is now in the Kirklees district, in the county of West Yorkshire.

A motorway and dam across the Dean Head Valley was proposed in the early 1960s and work began in 1964. Most buildings in the village were demolished or submerged in the reservoir when it was filled in 1969. Geologists considered the church and school would become unsafe once the dam was full. The church school closed in 1970 and is now a private residence.

Below Scammonden Road is an archaeological site of a late prehistoric settlement known as Meg Dyke.

== Geography ==
Scammonden is surrounded by the moorland of the Pennines east of Blackstone Edge. About 900 acres were enclosed in 1820 but the surrounding hills are uncultivated rough pasture. Roads from Elland, Huddersfield and Manchester passed through the village.

== Religion ==
There has been a chapel in Scammonden since 1615 and the church remains active. Scammonden was a chapelry in the Huddersfield ecclesiastical parish. Its old chapel was rebuilt at a cost of £1000 in 1813. It was replaced by the church in 1865. The church roof was replaced in 2002 with the aid of grants from English Heritage, charities and other community fundraising activities.

== See also ==
- Listed buildings in Colne Valley (western area)
