= Hartshead Moor services =

Highest motorway service station in the UK

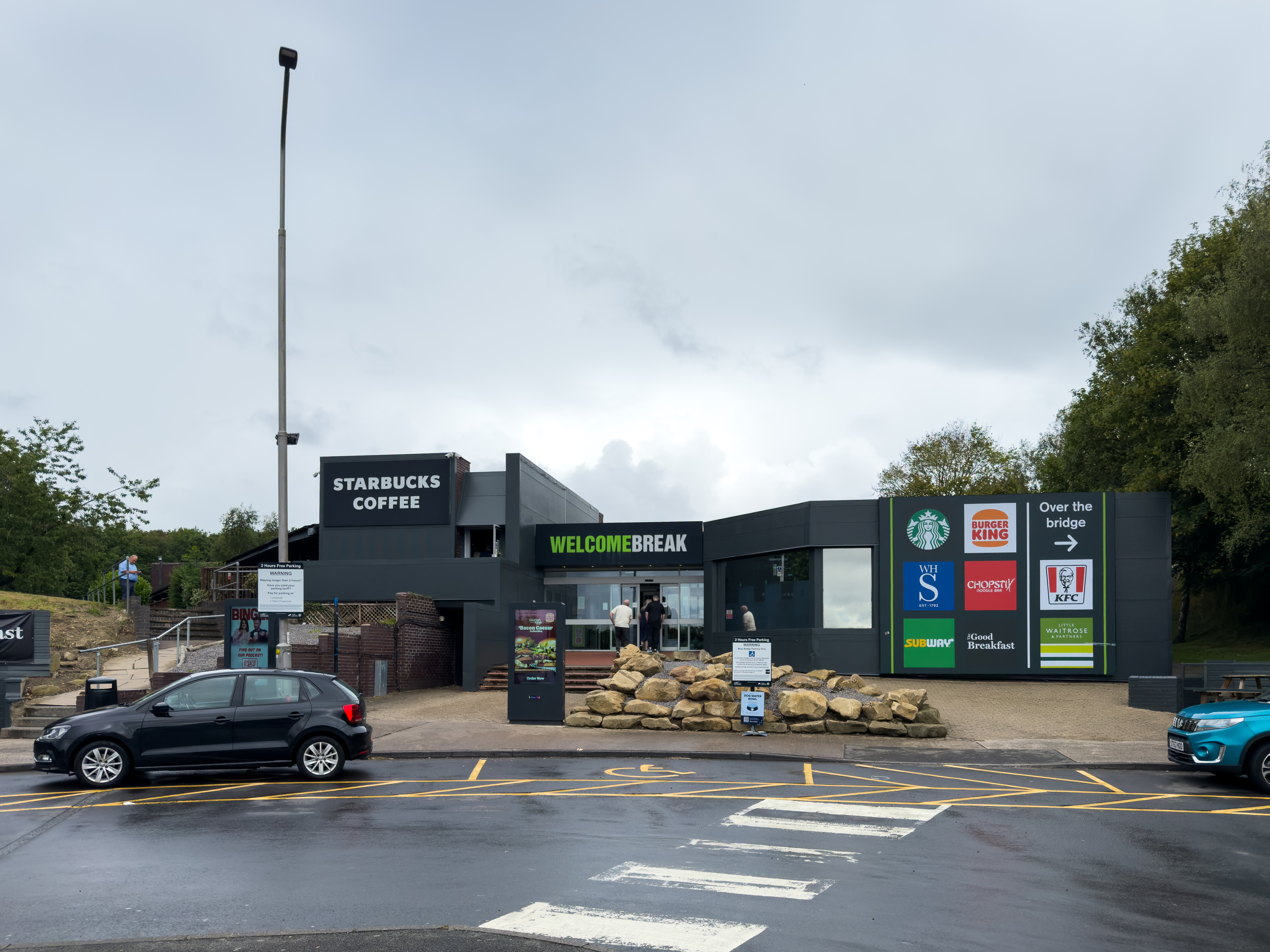
- The eastbound service area

- Location in West Yorkshire, England Location on the UK motorway network

Information
- County: West Yorkshire
- Road: M62 Motorway
- Coordinates: 53°42′48.3″N 01°44′43.9″W
- Operator: Welcome Break
- Previous operator: Ross
- Date opened: 5 July 1973
- Website: welcomebreak.co.uk/locations/hartshead-moor/

Hartshead Moor services is a motorway service station on the M62 near Brighouse, West Yorkshire.

== History ==
=== Construction ===
The service area was built from March 1972 by Shepherd Construction, for Ross Motorway Services, after Leicester Forest East, and with Membury services. Construction was to begin in December 1971. Cooperation would be with Huddersfield Polytechnic for training staff. 250 staff would be needed in the summer, and 225 in the winter. Each side would be 16 acres, with no restaurant. There would be a cafeteria on each side, with a movable partition for the transport cafeteria.

In February 1973, 46 year old Richard Clark was appointed as general manager. He had been catering manager of Washington Service Area, for Esso, and general manager of Leigh Delamere services, when it opened on the M4. He was married, with a policeman son. It opened on Thursday 5 July 1973, when the motorway section opened.

The 7.5 mile M62 section from Ainley Top to the Chain Bar (M606 motorway) was opened at the service station by Keith Speed on Thursday 5 July 1973. The motorway section should have opened in December 1972, but there was a report into box girder bridges by Sir Alec Merrison. It was the first permanently-lit section of motorway in Yorkshire, with five hundred 40-foot-high lights, and 46 miles of cable. In the summer of 1972, there was also a strike by the National Federation of Building Trades Operatives.

=== 1974 coach bombing ===
On 4 February 1974, a bomb was detonated on a coach ferrying British Army and Royal Air Force personnel from and to the bases at Catterick and Darlington during a period of industrial strike action on the trains. The incident occurred between junctions 26 and 27, shortly after midnight while most of those aboard were sleeping. Twelve people died and more than fifty were injured.

A memorial plaque was installed in memory of those who were killed, situated in the entrance hall of the westbound section of the service area, which was used as a first aid station for those wounded in the blast. A memorial service was held at the service area in February 2004. In 2009, a new memorial was created outside the service area at the wishes of the relatives of those killed.

=== Incidents ===
In December 2005, the RSPCA working with the BBC filmed the sale of an African puff adder at the service area, exploiting a legal loophole to sell on the snake. It was discovered in April 2006 that the service area's toilets were frequently being used for homosexual activity.

Alpine Cleaning Services, who successfully pitched for investment on the television show Dragons' Den, opened one of their first truck-washing facilities at the service area in August 2006.

=== Mural ===
The service station is one of fourteen for which large murals were commissioned from artist David Fisher in the 1990s, designed to reflect the local area and history.

== Location ==
The services are located between junctions 25 and 26 of the M62.

== Awards ==
- 2007 Loo of the Year award – Baby Change Facilities.
