= Pease Pottage services =

Motorway service area in West Sussex, England

Pease Pottage Services
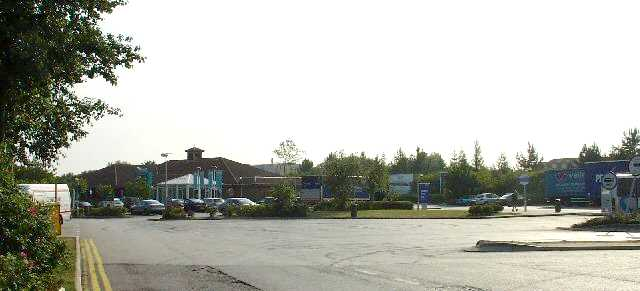
- Main building

- Location within West Sussex

Information
- County: West Sussex
- Road: M23
- Coordinates: 51.0834°N 0.1996°W
- Operator: Moto Hospitality
- Website: moto-way.com/services/pease-pottage/

Pease Pottage services is a motorway service station at Junction 11 of the M23 motorway near Crawley. It is owned by Moto.

== Facilities ==
Facilities on the site include M&S Foodhall and WHSmith. Burger King, Costa Coffee (with Costa Express), Greggs, Krispy Kreme & The West Cornwall Pasty Company all have outlets. Also free WiFi is offered on the site for all, there are a few gambling machines in a separate area and toilets.

== Artwork ==
The service station is one of fourteen with a large mural by David Fisher in the 1990s, designed to reflect the local area and history.
