= David Fisher (artist) =

English artist and designer (1946–2013)

David Fisher (1946 – 21 March 2013) was an award-winning English artist and designer based in Midsomer Norton, Somerset. He was a prolific designer and painter of pub signs before securing a unique commission to create vast murals to improve UK service stations. He has won many awards including the Holburne Museum of Art's portrait award. His work has been praised by Victoria Glendinning, Humphrey Ocean RA and John Leighton, Director of the National Galleries of Scotland.

== Early life ==
From 1961 to 1966 he served an apprenticeship as a signwriter and decorator for F.Speed and Sons in Midsomer Norton. From 1966 to 1970 he attended the West of England College of Art, now the School of Creative Arts, Bristol. He then went self-employed as a freelance artist and designer.

== Career ==
After leaving West of England College of Art he started a business at his home at the Hole in the Wall, Church Square, Midsomer Norton, painting pictorial pub signs for Courage Brewery and Butcombe Brewery. In this role he designed and created signs for pubs in Somerset, Wiltshire, South Gloucestershire and South Wales. He completed almost 400 signs in a fifteen-year period.

In the 1980s he commenced a ten-year period producing large scale murals for Trusthouse Forte's Welcome Break service areas on the country's motorway network. Fourteen were created, some measuring over sixty feet in length and eight feet high, setting a decorative theme for each site depending on its location. Some depicted local historical events, others recorded local battles, while some just informed travellers of attractions in that part of the country. These were placed in the following service station locations:

- Sedgemoor services (1987)
- Copdock services (1987)
- Pease Pottage services (1988)
- Newport Pagnell services (1988)
- Woodall services (1988)
- Michaelwood services (1991)
- Membury services (1991)
- Hartshead Moor services (1991)
- Abington services (1992)
- Gretna Green services (1993)
- Welcome Break-owned facilities at Heathrow Terminal 4 and Dover Eastern Port (1993 and 1990/1993).

During this period, he also undertook a number of commissions, including working for RoadChef, Royal Saudi Air Force, The Personalised Plates website, Qaboos bin Said al Said, the Sultan of Oman, National Giro and the Property Services Agency.

After working for 25 years in the corporate field, he moved towards more personal choices for his art, specialising in detailed landscapes, seascapes and portraits in both oil and watercolour.

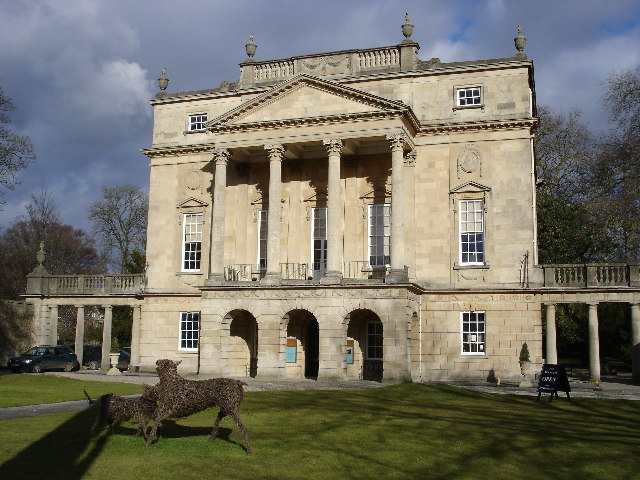
Holburne Museum of Art

In 2008 he won the Holburne Museum of Art's biennial portrait competition for Dead Man Posing, a portrait of Philip Ledbury from Frome, an artist who had been diagnosed with leukaemia. The prize was a commission of £5,000 for a portrait to be added to the Holburne's collection of portraiture. The panel of judges included the author Victoria Glendinning, John Leighton, Director of the National Galleries of Scotland and the artist Humphrey Ocean RA. They presented the award to him at a ceremony on 17 October.

He belonged to the Old Bakery Artists group that has been meeting monthly in Radstock since 2000. He died of cancer on 21 March 2013.

== Exhibitions ==
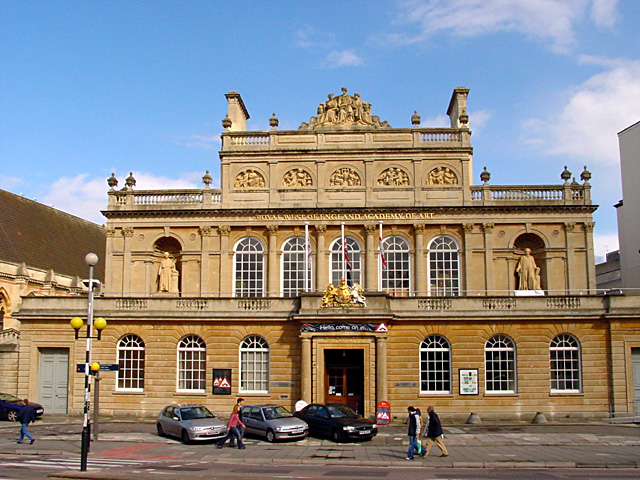
Royal West of England Academy

- Royal West of England Academy Autumn Exhibition, 2009.
- Royal United Hospital, 2009.
- Bel-Ami Gallery, Honiton, Devon, 2008.
- The Gallery, Stourhead, 2010.
- Holburne Museum of Art, Bath, 2008.
- Royal Society of Portrait Painters, annual exhibition, the Mall Galleries, Carlton House Terrace, London, 2008.
- Wells and Mendip Museum, 2009.
- Rook Lane Chapel, Frome, 2009.

== Honours ==
- Honorary Freeman of the Worshipful Company of Painter-Stainers.
- Associate of the Institute of British Decorators and Interior Designers (later incorporated into the Chartered Society of Designers).
- Selected for the Royal Society of Portrait Painters annual exhibition.

== Awards ==
- Shortlisted for the Daily Mail "Not the Turner Prize" award, 2003.
- Eight times winner of 'The Most Popular Picture in the Show' at the Royal Bath & West of England Society's annual show.
- Winner of the 2008 Holburne Portrait Prize for Dead Man Posing. He won a £5,000 commission to paint a portrait for the Museum's collection from the Holburne Museum of Art in Bath, Somerset.
- Winner of the Royal West of England Academy Award for his Reflections (oil on board 74 cm x 100 cm) 2007.

== Media coverage ==
His work has frequently been covered by local newspapers and magazines in Bath, Somerset and elsewhere, as well as by the BBC and arts media.
