= Membury services =

Motorway service station in Berkshire, England

Membury Services
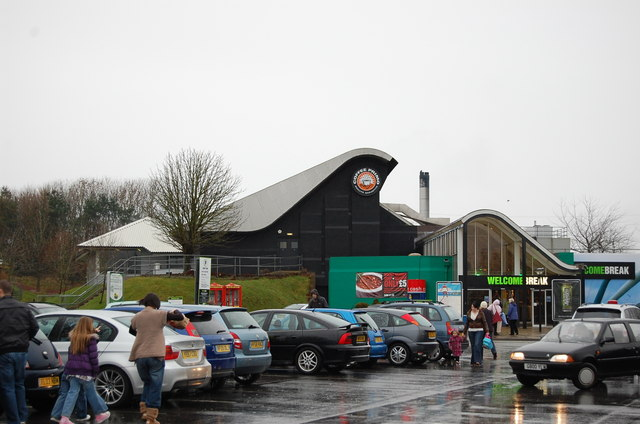

- Location within Berkshire

Information
- County: Berkshire
- Road: M4
- Coordinates: 51.4807°N 1.5569°W
- Operator: Welcome Break
- Date opened: February 1972 (partly), May 1973 (full)
- Website: welcomebreak.co.uk/locations/membury/

Membury services is a motorway service station on the M4 motorway, located on the original site of RAF Membury in the civil parish of Lambourn in the English county of Berkshire, close to the boundary with Wiltshire, 4 miles (6.4 km) west of Junction 14. It is owned by Welcome Break and is situated adjacent to the Membury Radio Mast.

== History ==
The service area was built by Ross Group, after Leicester Forest East, with Hartshead Moor services.

=== Construction ===
The services were built by Monk. Planning consent had been given in July 1970.

=== Food ===
It was designed by Howard V Lobb, to have three restaurants:

- truckers, 80 seats
- general self-service cafeteria area, 180 seats
- grill room, with waitress service, 120 seats

=== Opening ===
The eastbound side only opened for petrol and toilets in February 1972, but there were no meals until October 1972. The westbound side opened on Thursday 15 June 1972, with a snack bar, in a portakabin. By March 1973, it was announced that the full service area would open at the end of May 1973.

On 22 December 1971, a 50-mile (80 km) stretch of the M4 was opened between Badbury, Wiltshire near Swindon, and the Holyport Interchange on the A423(M); it was opened at 11 am by Michael Heseltine, and his daughter Alexandria, at the Holyport Interchange. The M4 section was the longest stretch of motorway to be opened in England, since the M1 in 1959. The service area is on the Theale to Shefford Woodlands section, which is 16.5 miles (26.6 km); the route was announced in December 1966, but altered in November 1967 after objections. The only services on the M4 in December 1971 were at Heston and Aust; Membury opened in February 1972; more service areas had been planned, but never built. The Winnersh Interchange, with the 2.5-mile (4.0 km)A329(M), opened in early 1973.

=== Buildings ===
Shell would run the pumps.

=== Planned services on the M4 ===
Other M4 service areas were planned at Warren Copse near Shurlock Row and Waltham St Lawrence (B3018), Furze Hill (B4009, Hermitage, Berkshire), and Ashes Copse near Bradfield, Berkshire; in June 1972, Berkshire County Council looked at Upper Wood Farm on Cutbush Lane in Earley, owned by the University of Reading.

== Facilities ==
Membury is one of five services which have a Starbucks drive-thru: the others are Fleet (Northbound only) M3, Warwick (Southbound only) M40, Hartshead Moor (Eastbound only) M62 and Gordano M5.

The service station is one of fourteen for which large murals were commissioned from artist David Fisher in the 1990s, designed to reflect the local area and history.

The services were constructed along with this section of the M4 from 1969 to 1971 by Arthur Monk and Co Ltd.

The Iron Age hillfort, Membury Camp, lies to the immediate southwest of the old airfield and the services.

Next eastbound: Chieveley	Motorway service stations on the M4 motorway	Next westbound: Leigh Delamere
