= Abington services =

Motorway service area in South Lanarkshire, Scotland

Abington Services
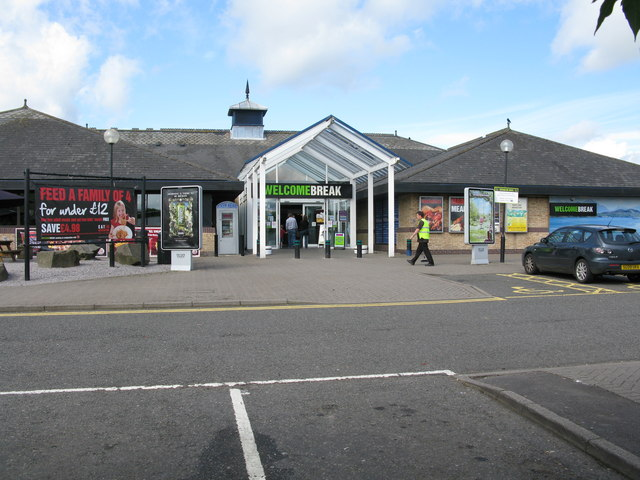
- The main services building

- Location within South Lanarkshire

Information
- County: South Lanarkshire
- Road: M74
- Coordinates: 55.5068°N 3.6948°W
- Operator: Welcome Break
- Website: welcomebreak.co.uk/locations/abington/

Abington services is a motorway service station near the village of Abington, Scotland. The service station is located next to the M74 motorway and is accessed using motorway junction 13 in both the northbound and southbound directions. It is owned by Welcome Break. In a 2001 survey by Which, Abington was the only service area to be given an excellent rating for its food. However, a survey in 2004 rated the service area as poor. They were awarded the five star Loo of the year award in 2008, after receiving only three stars in 2007 and 2006.

The service station is one of fourteen for which large murals were commissioned from artist David Fisher in the 1990s, designed to reflect the local area and history.
