= Membury transmitting station =

Telecommunications facility in Berkshire, England

Membury
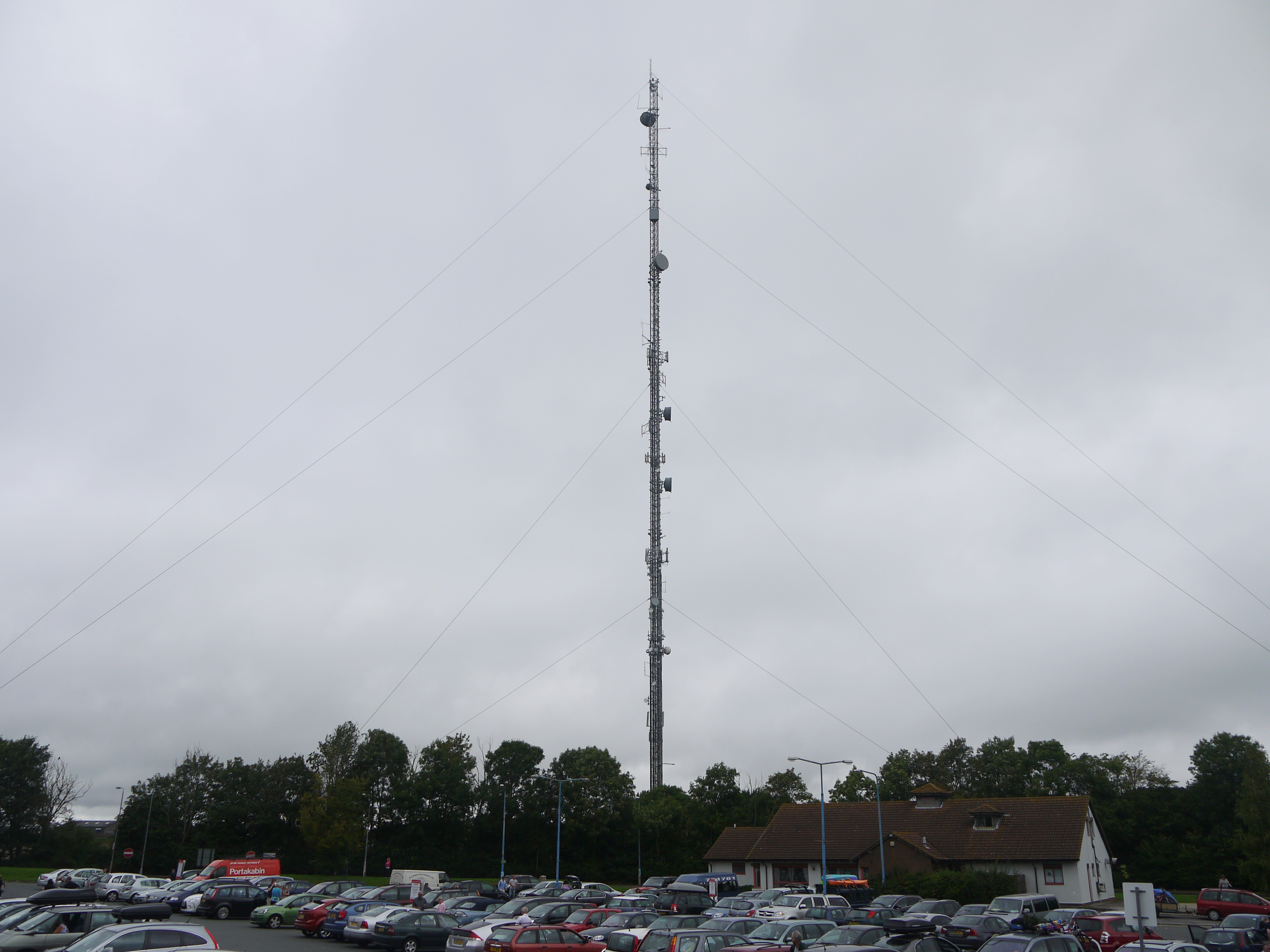
- Membury transmitting station

- Location within Berkshire
- Mast height: 152.4 m (500 ft)
- Coordinates: 51°29′5.7″N 1°33′31.7″W
- Built: 1965
- ITV region: ABC & ATV (1965–1968); ATV (1968–1981); Central (1982–1985)

The Membury transmitting station is a broadcasting and telecommunications facility in England, situated adjacent to the M4 motorway at the Membury services in the south-west corner of the parish of Lambourn close to the town of Hungerford, in Berkshire. It is owned and operated by Arqiva.

It has a 152.4 m (500 ft) high guyed steel lattice mast. It was constructed by the ITA in 1965 to bring ITV signals (provided by ATV and ABC) to the "South Midlands", including Oxford, Swindon, Newbury and Marlborough on 405-line VHF, using Channel 12 (Band III).

It was not used for any broadcast services for a decade after the closure of 405 line television in 1985. However, in 1995 a low power VHF FM filler for the four national BBC radio networks was added (at 125 watts, vertical polarisation only), improving reception along the M4 corridor between Newbury and Swindon.

In January 2003, a DAB transmitter was added for the NOW Swindon & Wiltshire multiplex. The BBC added a signal for its national DAB services in 2009. Both BBC Radio Berkshire and BBC Radio Wiltshire broadcast from this transmitter on DAB.

The mast also hosts transmission equipment for numerous mobile telephone networks.

The mast is a highly visible landmark and can be clearly seen from The Ridgeway, White Horse Hill and most of the Lambourn Downs. This makes it a useful reference point for hikers, ramblers, and aircraft following visual flight rules. The red safety lights which mark the structure at night become visible for eastbound M4 motorists from as early as Swindon East (Junction 15). For those travelling Westbound on the M4, the red safety lights are visible as early as Junction 13 and Chieveley Services.

== Channels listed by frequency ==
=== Analogue radio (FM VHF) ===
Frequency	kW	Service
88.9 MHz	0.12	BBC Radio 2
91.1 MHz	0.12	BBC Radio 3
93.3 MHz	0.12	BBC Radio 4
98.4 MHz	0.12	BBC Radio 1

=== Digital radio (DAB) ===
Frequency	Block	kW	Operator
220.352 MHz	11C	1	NOW Wiltshire
225.648 MHz	12B	5	BBC National DAB
229.072 MHz	12D	1	NOW Berkshire & North Hampshire

=== Analogue television ===
Analogue 405 line tv were ceased in 1982.

Frequency	VHF	kW	Service
209.75 MHz	12	—	Central (ABC until 1968/ATV until 1982)

== See also ==
- List of masts
- List of tallest buildings and structures in Great Britain
- List of radio stations in the United Kingdom
