= Membury Camp =

Iron Age hillfort in Wiltshire, England

- Membury Fort
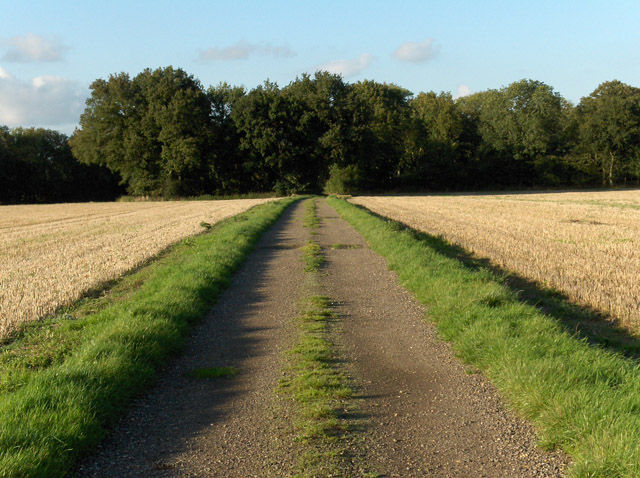

- Location within Wiltshire
- 51.4763°N 1.5665°W
- Periods: Iron Age
- Location: Wiltshire

Site notes
- Height: 200 m (660 ft)
- Area: 14 ha (35 acres)
- Public access: yes

Membury Camp, or Membury Fort, is the site of an Iron Age hill fort located in England on the borders of Wiltshire and Berkshire counties, (the county line divides the site in two, although the majority of the site lies within Wiltshire). The site encompasses 14 hectares, and is situated in the south-western corner of a small plateau. The circular earthworks are completely shrouded in trees and inside the walls it is mostly arable farmland. To the northeast, in the Berkshire segment, the camp is totally wooded by a small copse, Walls Copse, which covers a quarter of the site. To the north and east the adjoining ground is flat, but to the south and west it falls away steeply, providing a natural defence. The camp consists of a single ditch with banks on either side and encloses and area measuring 390m by 490m. A gap in the east with inturning flanks is probably an original entrance though it is mutilated and overgrown. Other gaps in the banks appear to be more modern. A possible hut circle is visible as a cropmark situated at the south end of the hill fort. The east side of the earthwork has been partly destroyed by the construction of a wartime airfield, RAF Membury. The site has not been excavated but a number of prehistoric finds have been found in the vicinity. It is a scheduled ancient monument no. 228970. There have been several collections of pottery found, in 1977, 1980 and 1987. Other significant finds have also included flint artefacts from the Mesolithic era, and flint tools from the Neolithic era, prior to the Iron Age.

== Location ==
The site is located at grid reference SU302753, to the southwest of the village and parish of Lambourn, in the county of Wiltshire and in part Berkshire. The site lies at a height of approximately 200m AOD. There is a public footpath that runs through the site and bridleways to the east and south of the site. The M4 motorway lies to the immediate north and northeast. The motorway services station Membury services, and the wartime airfield, RAF Membury, also lie to the immediate north east.

== See also ==
- List of places in Wiltshire
- List of places in Berkshire
- List of hill forts in England
- List of hill forts in Scotland
- List of hill forts in Wales
