= M62 motorway =

Motorway in the United Kingdom

M62
- Lancashire–Yorkshire Motorway
- M62 highlighted in blue
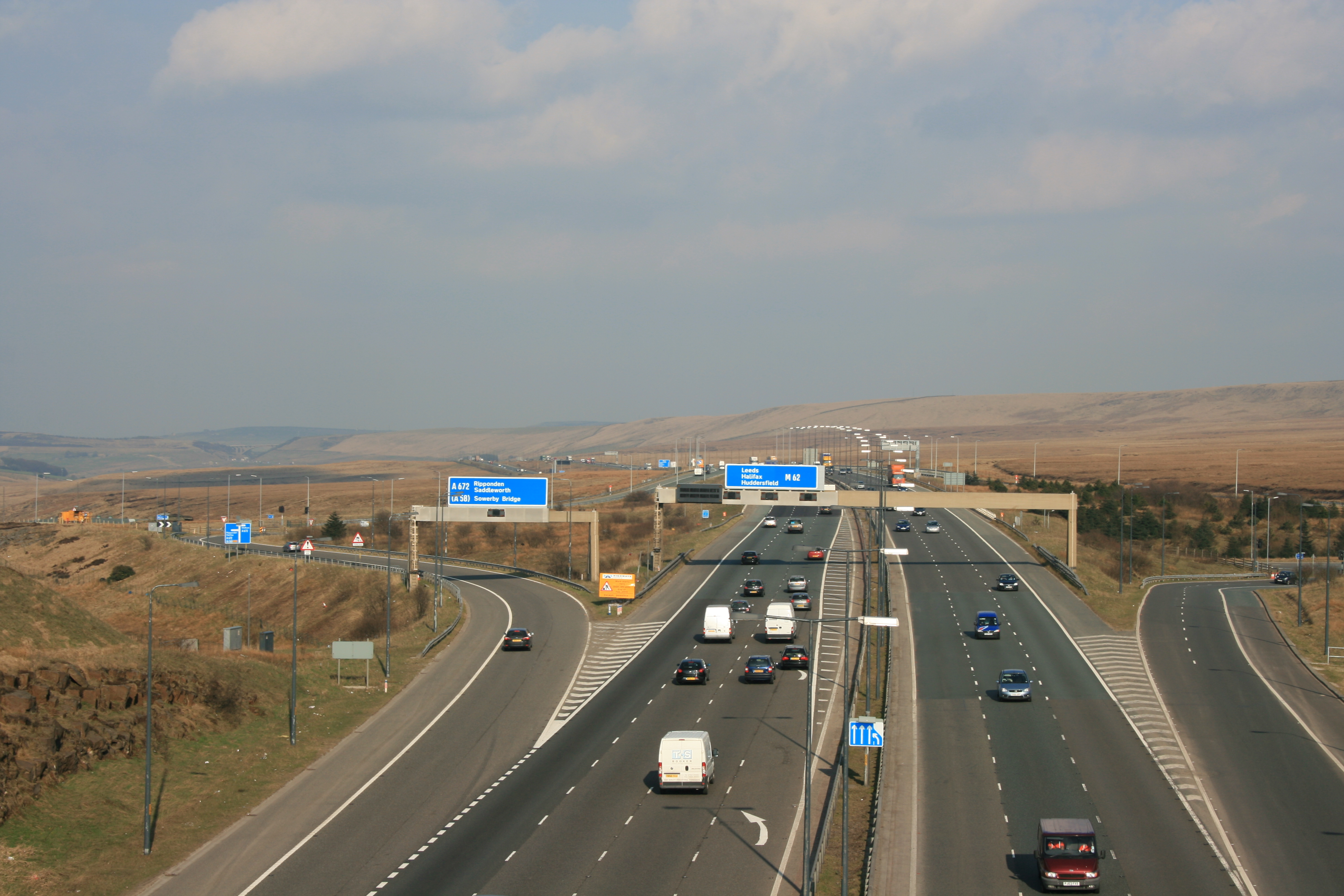
- Looking east at junction 22, the highest point on the English motorway network, from the Pennine Way, 2010

Route information
- Part of E20 and E22
- Maintained by National Highways; Knowsley Metropolitan Borough Council; Liverpool City Council
- Length: 107 mi (172 km) 7 miles (11 km) are part of the M60 motorway
- History: Opened: 1960; Completed: 1976

Major junctions
- West end: Liverpool
- J6 → M57 motorway J10 → M6 motorway / J12 → M60 motorway/M602 motorway / J18 → M60 motorway/M66 motorway J20 → A627(M) motorway J26 → M606 motorway J27 → M621 motorway J29 → M1 motorway J32a → A1(M) motorway J35 → M18 motorway
- East end: North Cave

Location
- Country: United Kingdom
- Counties: Merseyside, Cheshire, Greater Manchester, West Yorkshire, North Yorkshire, East Riding of Yorkshire
- Primary destinations: Liverpool, Huyton, Warrington, Manchester, Oldham, Rochdale, Huddersfield, Halifax, Bradford, Leeds, Wakefield, Pontefract, Goole

Road network
- Roads in the United Kingdom; Motorways; A and B road zones
| ← M61 | → M65 |

The M62 is a 107-mile-long (172 km) west–east trans-Pennine motorway in Northern England, connecting Liverpool and Hull via Manchester, Bradford, Leeds and Wakefield; 7 miles (11 km) of the route is shared with the M60 orbital motorway around Manchester. The road is part of the unsigned Euroroutes E20 (Shannon to Saint Petersburg) and E22 (Holyhead to Ishim).

The motorway, which was first proposed in the 1930s, and conceived as two separate routes, was opened in stages between 1971 and 1976, with construction beginning at Pole Moor near Huddersfield and finishing at that time in Tarbock on the outskirts of Liverpool. The motorway absorbed the northern end of the Stretford-Eccles bypass, which was built between 1957 and 1960. Adjusted for inflation to 2007, its construction cost approximately £765 million. The motorway has an average daily traffic flow of 144,000 vehicles in West Yorkshire, and has several sections prone to traffic congestion, in particular, between Leeds and Huddersfield and the M60 section around Eccles. The M62 coach bombing of 1974 and the Great Heck rail crash of 2001 are the largest incidents to have occurred on the motorway.

Stott Hall Farm, situated between the carriageways on the Pennine section, has become one of the best-known sights on the motorway. The M62 has no junctions numbered 1, 2 or 3, or even an officially numbered 4, because it was intended to start in Liverpool proper, not in its outskirts.

Between Liverpool and Manchester, and east of Leeds, the terrain along which the road passes is relatively flat. Between Manchester and Leeds it traverses the Pennines and its foothills, rising to 1,221 feet (372 m) above sea level slightly east of junction 22 in Calderdale, not far from the boundary between Greater Manchester and West Yorkshire.

== Planning ==
The motorway's origins are found in the 1930s, when the need for a route between Lancashire and Yorkshire had been agreed after discussion by their county highway authorities. At the same time, it was envisaged that a route between Liverpool and Hull was needed to connect the ports to industrial Yorkshire.

After the Second World War, the Minister of Transport appointed engineers to inspect road standards between the A580 East Lancashire Road in Swinton and the A1 road near Selby. The 1949 Road Plan for South Lancashire identified the need to upgrade the A580 to dual carriageway with grade separation and provide bypasses at Huyton and Cadishead. In 1952, the route for a trans-Pennine motorway, the Lancashire–Yorkshire Motorway, was laid down, with Ferrybridge at the eastern terminus rather than Selby. By the 1960s, the proposed A580 upgrade to dual carriageway was considered inadequate, and there was an urgent need to link Liverpool to the motorway network.

The route of the Lancashire-Yorkshire motorway was considered inadequate as it failed to cater for several industrial towns in Yorkshire. When James Drake visited the United States in 1962, his experience of the Interstate Highway System led him to conclude that the Merseyside Expressway, planned to run between Liverpool and the M6, would need to be extended to the Stretford-Eccles Bypass and beyond, to create a continuous motorway between Liverpool and Ferrybridge (a link between Ferrybridge and Hull was not considered until 1964). Initially the plans were unpopular and not supported by the Ministry of Transport, but the scheme was added to the Road Plan in 1963.

=== Surveying ===
Formal planning began on Wednesday 12 July 1961, when Ernest Marples authorised the two surveyors of Lancashire and the West Riding – Sir James Drake of Lancashire and Stuart Maynard Lovell of the West Riding, to plan a 50-mile (80 km) motorway from Worsley, in Lancashire, to Ledsham (now the Selby Fork) in the West Riding. From either end, the plan was that there would be 'improved roads' from the eastern end, at the Selby Fork, eastwards to Hull, and 'improved roads' from the western end, at Worsley (now the Worsley Braided Interchange), westwards to Liverpool.

== Construction ==
=== Liverpool to Worsley ===
It was the intention to build an urban motorway in Liverpool. The M62 was intended to terminate at Liverpool's Inner Motorway, which was not built. The proposed route would have followed the railway into Liverpool as far as Edge Hill, with junctions at Rathbone Road and Durning Road where it would drop to two lanes before terminating at the Islington Radial. Difficulties arose building the Liverpool urban motorway resulting in delays, with the section between Tarbock and Liverpool the last to be completed in 1976. In total, two viaducts, ten bridges and seven underpasses were constructed to secure the structural integrity of the surrounding residential areas. The motorway was constructed only as far as the Queens Drive inner ring road, which is junction 4.

The section west of Manchester was intended to be a separate motorway, the M52 to link Liverpool and Salford, but a continuous motorway between Leeds and Liverpool was deemed more feasible, Construction between Liverpool and Manchester started in 1971, with the construction of a link between the M57 and M6 motorways. Simultaneously, a contract to link the M6 with Manchester was underway, which required land drainage and the removal of unsuitable earth. This section was completed in August 1974, creating a continuous link between Ferrybridge and Tarbock.

=== Greater Manchester ===
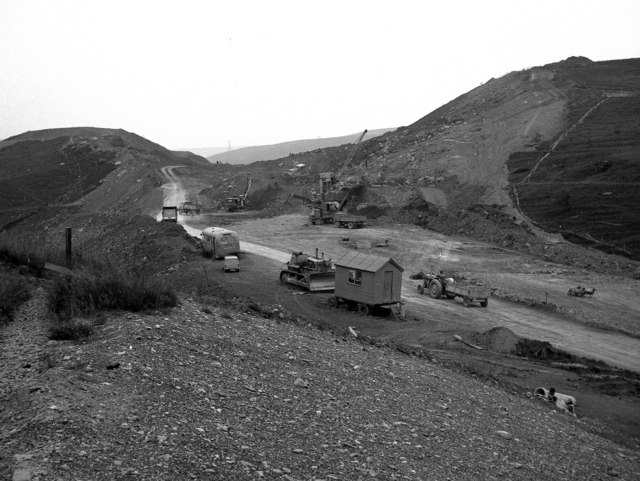
Construction starting in Milnrow, July 1968

Two motorways were planned, the M52 from Liverpool to Salford and the M62 to link Pole Moor with the Stretford–Eccles Bypass. The first part of the M62 to be built was the Stretford–Eccles Bypass, which is now the section between junctions 7 and 13 of the M60. Construction started in 1957, and the motorway opened in 1960. It was originally built as a two-lane motorway only. It was later re-numbered M63. The section of the planned M52 between the interchange with the Stretford-Eccles Bypass and Salford opened as the M602 motorway in 1971.

The Eccles–Pole Moor section of the M62 opened in 1971. Between Eccles and Pole Moor, 67 motorway crossings were required, including seven viaducts and eight junctions. Much of the Worsley Braided Interchange was built on undeveloped mossland where deep peat deposits had been covered with waste. Between Worsley and Milnrow, some underlying coal seams were still actively worked when the motorway was constructed and allowances had to be made to counteract possible future subsidence. The motorway crosses the Irwell Valley and the Pendleton Fault on a 200-foot (61 m) single-span bridge 65 feet (20 m) above the river.

=== Milnrow to Outlane ===
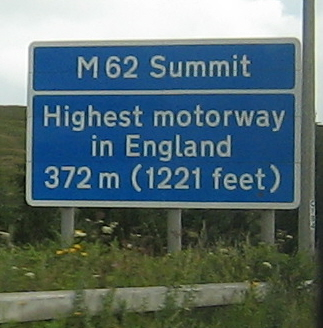
M62 Summit sign in July 2017, located at 53.6298°N 2.0184°W

Surveying for the Pennine section began in November 1961 and its route was determined in July 1963. Construction between Windy Hill and Pole Moor was difficult through inhospitable hilly terrain, peat bog, and in undesirable weather conditions. The motorway's highest point, 1,221 feet (372 m) above sea level at Windy Hill near Denshaw (53.62982°N 2.018561°W) is the highest point of any motorway in England.

A notable structure between junctions 21 and 22 on the uphill section towards Windy Hill is the Rakewood Viaduct which carries the road over the Longden End Brook.

The first section of the motorway in Yorkshire was completed between the county boundary at Windy Hill and Outlane in 1970. To build this section, 12,000,000 cubic yards (9,200,000 m^{3}) of material was moved, 8,000,000 cubic yards (6,100,000 m^{3}) of which was solid rock and 650,000 cubic yards (500,000 m^{3}) of peat which had to be cut from the rock strata and deposited on adjacent hillsides. The geology of the moors resulted in the engineers splitting the carriageways for 3/4 mile (1.2 km) in the middle of this section, sparing Stott Hall Farm from demolition. The farm, which was built in the 18th century, remains the only one situated in the middle of a UK motorway.

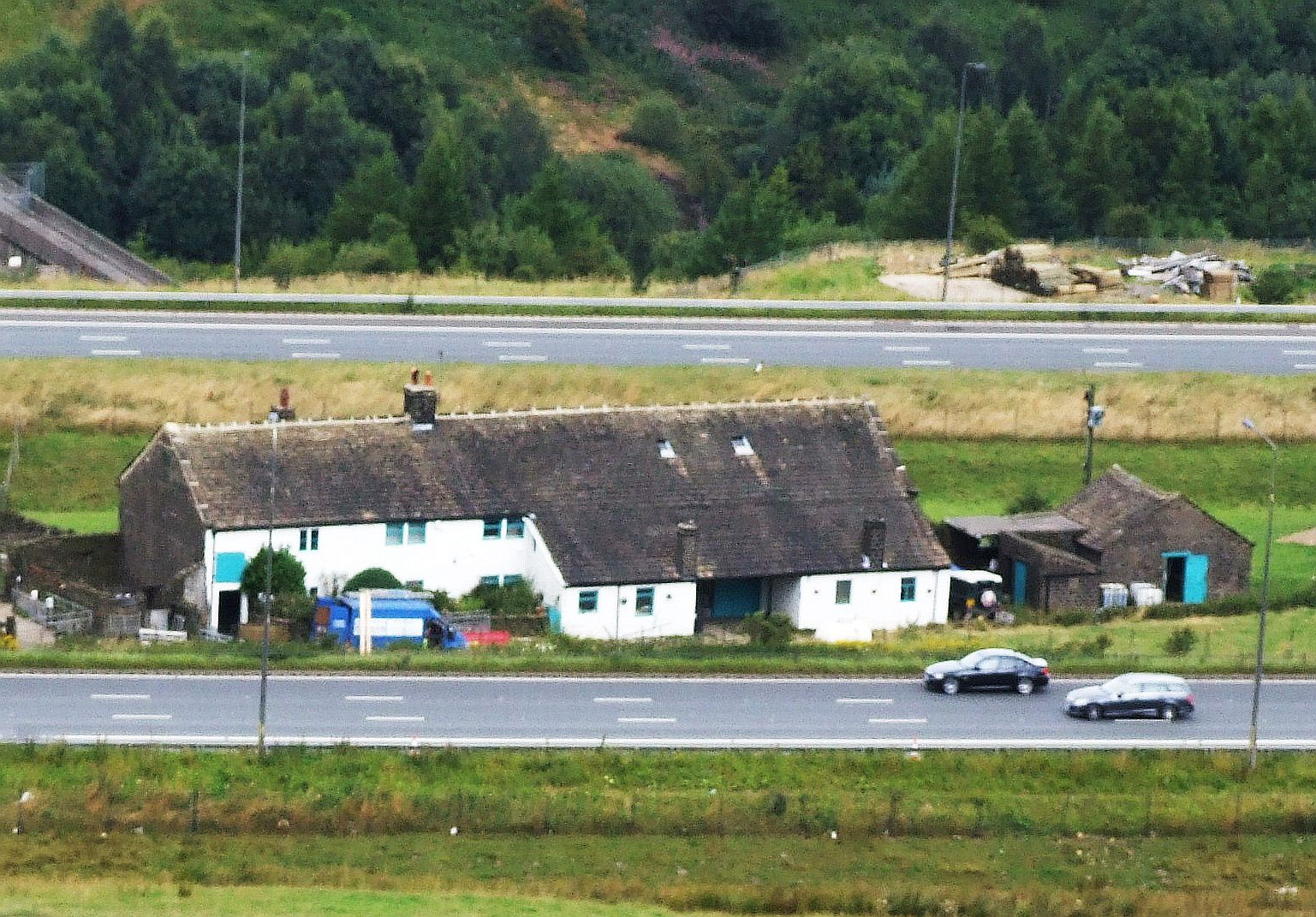
Stott Hall Farm, viewed from moorland above westbound carriageway in August 2009

The motorway crosses Scammonden Dam on an embankment between junctions 22 and 23. Preparatory work in the Deanhead Valley began in August 1964 and the dam in 1966. The motorway's opening on 20 December 1970 was dependent on completion of the dam. Two other notable constructions on the Pennine section are the pedestrian bridge carrying the Pennine Way, which is curved downwards with 85-foot (26 m) long cantilevers, and Scammonden Bridge, the longest single-span non-suspension bridge in the world when it was built. It carries a B road 120 feet (37 m) above the motorway. The 1-mile (1.6 km) section between Pole Moor and Outlane suffered fewer problems as the summer weather was satisfactory.

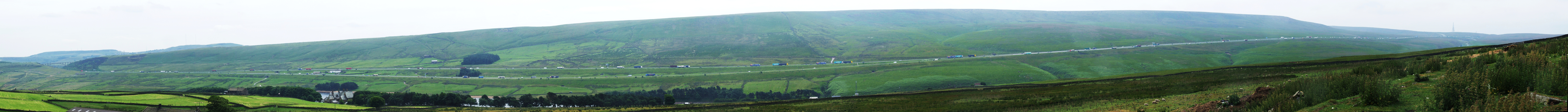
Southerly view from Booth Moor, Calderdale, of the M62 motorway from Scammonden Bridge to Windy Hill. Stott Hall Farm can be seen between the east and westbound carriageways in July 2010

=== Outlane to Lofthouse ===
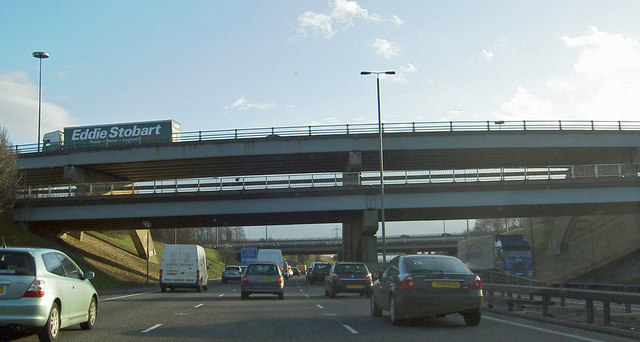
Stationary traffic at Lofthouse Interchange in March 2008

The section of the motorway between Gildersome and Lofthouse was built at the same time, resulting in the demolition of a significant proportion of the village of Tingley to build the eponymous interchange.

Lofthouse Interchange was built between 1965 and 1967. Owen Williams and the Babtie Group were the engineers. Located where the M62 crosses above the M1 motorway, it is a complex three-level junction with eight bridges including a roundabout supported by four long curved bridges on 12-metre (39 ft) piers above both motorways. The roundabout's north and south bridges have spans of 28 m (92 ft) and the east and west have spans of 21 m (69 ft). The M62 overbridge has a reinforced concrete multi-cellular deck of four spans. Two other pre-stressed reinforced concrete bridges carry slip roads over Longthorpe Lane, the B6135. Another bridge with no motorway access carries Longthorpe Lane over the M1.

Two skew tunnels were constructed beneath the original junction between 1996 and 1999. The tunnels, constructed using the cut-and-cover method, are for traffic travelling between the M1 south-bound and the M62 west. The tunnel under the M62 is 147 m (482 ft) in length.

=== East of Lofthouse ===
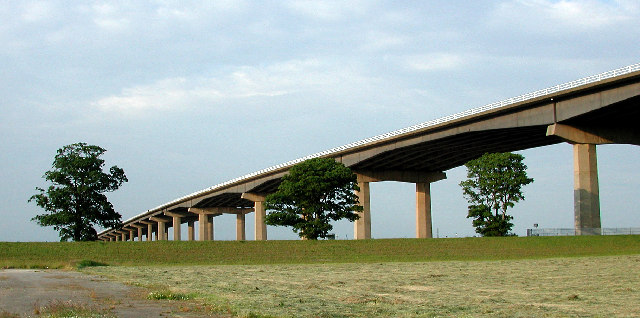
The Ouse Bridge, from the floodplain adjacent to the river in April 2002

Two contracts were awarded for the section between Lofthouse and Ferrybridge in 1972, and both were completed in 1974. On the first contract, care was needed at the River Calder crossing due to the alluvial bedrock. On the second contract precautions were taken as the length was built on old coal mine workings.

The section between Ferrybridge and North Cave was the last to be planned and built. The Ouse Bridge, across the River Ouse west of Goole, commenced in January 1973 and is nearly 1 mile (1.6 km) long and rises to 98.4 feet (30.0 m) above ground level. Completion of the bridge was delayed due to "steel supplies [being] a chronic headache" and a partial collapse of the framework caused by bolts joining a cross-beam to a trestle shearing. Problems with the bridge delayed the opening of the section east of Goole to May 1976.

== Development ==
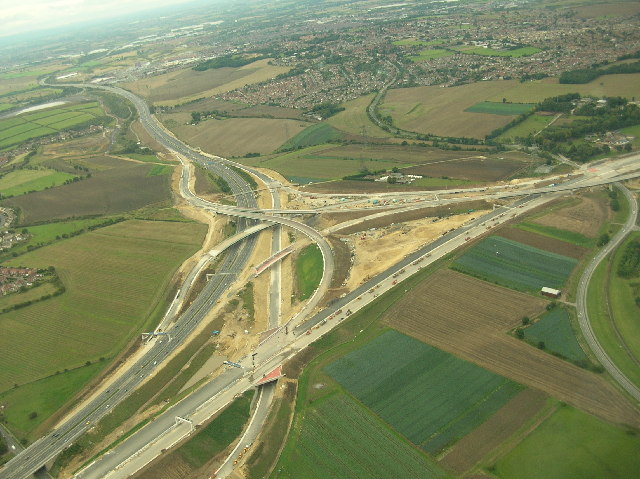
Junction 32a during construction in September 2005

In 1987 the Department of Transport proposed a parallel relief road to combat congestion around Manchester. It would have been restricted to long-distance traffic, and the current route, part of the Manchester Outer Ring Road (later the M60), used for local traffic. The proposal suggested the closure of junction 13. The proposal was designated a "long term" improvement in 1994, and cancelled on 23 November 1995.

In 1998 the section between Eccles Interchange and Simister Island (junctions 12 to 18) was designated the M60. Since then, two junctions were opened—in December 2002, the missing junction 8 was opened to allow access to the A574 and the Omega Development Site, while in January 2006, junction 32a was opened to link to the upgraded A1(M). The UK's first motorway high-occupancy vehicle lane was opened at junction 26 in 2008 for eastbound traffic from the M606 with more than one occupant.

=== Smart motorway ===
Pre-2009 proposals to widen the motorway between junctions 25 and 28 to four lanes were withdrawn in January 2009 and replaced by a project to install hard shoulder running and a smart motorway system between junctions 25 and 30. Work started in 2014 to install the system around the M62 – M60 section.

== Services ==
In December 1973 a service area at Hensall, North Yorkshire was proposed, to be 40 acres. There would be a transport café, with a separate cafeteria on each side. It would cost £700,000. A similar motorway service station was proposed at Abbey Barn, south of High Wycombe on the M40, around the same time, and which likewise was neither built.

== Traffic ==
1999–2006 traffic flow graph

The section between junctions 18 (with the M60) and 29 (with the M1) through Greater Manchester and West Yorkshire has been identified as one of the most congested roads in Britain. The motorway provides a direct link between three of the five largest metro areas in England, and is the most practical route for HGVs and other commercial traffic between Manchester and Leeds. There are a significant number of warehouses in these urban areas, which require commercial delivery to the ports at Merseyside and around the Humber, all of which are transported via the M62.

Annual average daily traffic flows of 100,000 cars were recorded east of the Pennines (junction 22) in 2006 and 78,000 cars west of the Pennines. The figures were increases from 90,000 and 70,000 respectively in 1999. By way of comparison, the UK's busiest motorway, the M25 carried 144,000 cars between junctions 7 and 23 in 2006.

== Major incidents ==
On 4 February 1974, a bomb was detonated on a coach travelling between Chain Bar (junction 26) and Gildersome (junction 27). The coach was transporting off-duty army personnel and their family members. Twelve people were killed and 38 were injured. Hartshead Moor services was used as a makeshift hospital and base for investigations. The Provisional Irish Republican Army was deemed responsible. A memorial to the victims was erected at Hartshead Moor services in 2009.

The Selby rail crash happened on 28 February 2001, at 06:13 after Gary Hart, a sleep-deprived driver, swerved off the M62 onto the East Coast Main Line near Selby. While he was calling the emergency services, a GNER southbound train collided with his Land Rover and derailed into the path of an oncoming freight train. Ten people were killed, including the drivers of both trains, and 82 others were injured. Hart was later convicted of ten counts of causing death by dangerous driving, and was sentenced to five years in prison.

On 1 March 2018, a Highways England car fire in severe weather conditions (the beast from the East) caused up to 3,500 vehicles to become trapped on the eastbound Pennine section between junctions 20 and 24. Up to 200 people spent the night in their vehicles. The military, mountain rescue, fire services and Highways England worked alongside the police through the night to ensure people's safety. Members of the public who lived in Milnrow and Newhey climbed up onto the motorway with food and drinks for the trapped people in their cars and trucks. A barrier between the carriageways was removed to facilitate moving most of the vehicles. The road remained closed the next day due to the weather conditions.

== Route ==
The M62's route in relation to the four major cities it serves: Liverpool, Manchester, Leeds and Hull

In addition to passing Warrington, Manchester, Huddersfield, Halifax, Bradford, Leeds and Wakefield, the towns of Huyton, St Helens, Widnes, Bury, Rochdale, Oldham, Pontefract, Selby and Goole are designated primary destinations along the road. Many of the professional and semi-professional teams playing rugby league in England are connected by the M62 motorway and so the term M62 corridor is sometimes used to refer to the area where rugby league is most popular. The motorway was depicted in a BBC trailer for the 2021 Rugby League World Cup in England.

The M62 is a terminus to two motorways: the M57 near Prescot and the M18 near Rawcliffe; and has four spur routes: the M602, which serves Manchester, the A627(M), which serves Oldham and Rochdale, the M606, which serves Bradford, and the M621, which serves Leeds.

Despite Hull being listed as a primary destination, the motorway downgrades near North Cave, 16 miles (26 km) to the west.

The western end of the motorway is at Queen's Drive, on Liverpool's middle ring road from where it runs eastward to the outer ring road, the M57. The route has four exits for Warrington: junction 7, an interchange with the A57 road, junction 8, which also houses IKEA, junction 9, which interchanges with the A49 road, which was intended to be a motorway, and junction 11. Between these is junction 10, which is a cloverstack interchange with the M6. The M62 crosses Chat Moss before interchanging with the M60 motorway. Owing to the original plan to extend this section of the motorway into Manchester, motorists must turn off to stay on (a TOTSO) the route into Yorkshire.

In Greater Manchester, the motorway shares seven junctions, 12 to 18, with the M60 motorway. Junction 13, signposted Leigh, is situated 1/2 mile (0.80 km) from junction 12, leaving exiting motorists the hazard of crossing the still-merging M62 traffic. Worsley Braided Interchange serves junctions 14 and 15 and junctions 1 to 3 of the M61, which terminates to Preston.

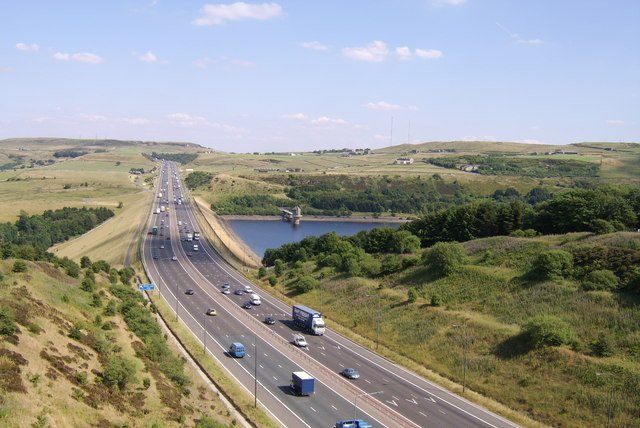
M62 passes Scammonden Water in West Yorkshire

Between junction 21 and junction 22, the motorway has four lanes eastbound to climb Windy Hill, before crossing the border into Yorkshire and interchanging with the rural A672 road, reaching the highest point of any motorway in England 1,221 feet (372 m). There is then a 7-mile (11 km) travel through the Pennines to the next junction, passing Scammonden Reservoir and Stott Hall Farm. The next junction is 23, which is accessible only for westbound traffic. After this, the road dips through a valley to junction 24 and drops slowly before interchanging with the A644 road at junction 25. Between junctions 22 and 25, the road is used as a border between the metropolitan boroughs of Calderdale and Kirklees.

At junction 26, Chain Bar, the motorway interchanges with several roads: the M606, a spur into Bradford, the A58 road, which runs between Prescot and Wetherby, and the A638 road, which runs to Doncaster, then follows the old route of the A1 through Bawtry and Retford, to Markham Moor where it rejoins the A1. The next junction also serves a spur route: the M621 motorway, before bypassing Leeds to the south to the interchange with the M1 motorway, Lofthouse Interchange, at junction 29. East of Leeds, the motorway serves Wakefield at junction 30 and crosses by the River Calder. At junction 32a, the road is crossed by the A1(M) motorway, which also runs parallel to it for a short distance. The next junction 33 serves the A162 and A1 roads, and Ferrybridge service station. After Ferrybridge, the motorway becomes relatively flat. At junction 35, the motorway meets with the northern terminus of the M18 at a triangle (semi-directioinal-T) interchange. Soon after, there is a 1-mile (1.6 km) bridge that crosses the River Ouse. For approximately 10 miles (16 km) after this, the road runs towards Hull, serving Howden and North Cave, before downgrading to the A63 road.

== Junctions ==
M62 motorway junctions
| County | Location | mi | km | Junction | Destinations | Notes |
|---|---|---|---|---|---|---|
| Merseyside | Liverpool | 0 | 0 | 4 | A5080 – Central Liverpool | Road continues West as A5080 (Note: 53.4060°N 2.8963°W) |
| Merseyside | Liverpool | 1.2 | 2.0 | 5 | A5080 – Central Liverpool, Huyton | (Note: 53.4074°N 2.8671°W) |
| Merseyside | Liverpool | 3.9 | 6.2 | 6 | A5080 – Widnes, Huyton M57 – Aintree, Widnes | (Note: 53.3983°N 2.8083°W) |
| Merseyside | Rainhill | 6.6 | 10.6 | 7 | A57 – Rainhill, Warrington A570 – St Helens A557 – Widnes | (Note: 53.4033°N 2.7456°W) |
| Cheshire | Warrington | 10.7 | 17.3 | 8 | Burtonwood Road – Great Sankey; Burtonwood services | (Note: 53.4155°N 2.6467°W) |
| Cheshire | Warrington | 12.8 | 20.7 | 9 | A49 – Winwick, Central Warrington | (Note: 53.4228°N 2.5977°W) |
| Cheshire | Warrington | 14.6 | 23.5 | 10 | M6 – Preston, Lancaster, Stoke on Trent, Birmingham | (Note: 53.4260°N 2.5561°W) |
| Cheshire | — | 17.0 | 27.3 | 11 | A574 – Birchwood | (Note: 53.4349°N 2.5000°W) |
| Greater Manchester | — | 23.6 | 37.9 | 12 | M60 – Stockport, Trafford Park M602 – Central Manchester | Road continues North as M60 until M60 junction 18 (Note: 53.4875°N 2.3766°W) |
concurrency with the M60
| Greater Manchester | — | 31.1 | 50.0 | 18 | M60 – Ashton under Lyne M66 – Bury | Road continues from M60 junction 18 (Note: 53.5498°N 2.2605°W) |
| Greater Manchester | Middleton | 32.8 | 52.8 | Birch Services | | (Note: 53.5679°N 2.2314°W) |
| Greater Manchester | Middleton | 34.0 | 54.7 | 19 | A6046 – Middleton, Heywood | (Note: 53.5762°N 2.2068°W) |
| Greater Manchester | Rochdale | 36.2 | 58.3 | 20 | A627(M) – Oldham, Rochdale | (Note: 53.5868°N 2.1578°W) |
| Greater Manchester | Rochdale | 38.3 | 61.7 | 21 | A640 – Newhey, Milnrow A6193 – Rochdale | (Note: 53.6016°N 2.1114°W) |
| West Yorkshire | — | 42.9 | 69.1 | 22 | A672 – Oldham, Halifax | (Note: 53.6297°N 2.0198°W) |
| West Yorkshire | Huddersfield | 50.1 | 80.6 | 23 | A640 – Outlane, Huddersfield A643 – Brighouse | No Eastbound entrance or Westbound exit (Note: 53.6601°N 1.8613°W) |
| West Yorkshire | Huddersfield | 51.5 | 82.9 | 24 | A643 – Brighouse A629 – Halifax, Huddersfield | (Note: 53.6717°N 1.8332°W) |
| West Yorkshire | Huddersfield | 55.3 | 89.0 | 25 | A644 – Dewsbury, Brighouse | (Note: 53.6953°N 1.7535°W) |
| West Yorkshire | Cleckheaton | 56.7 | 91.3 | Hartshead Moor services | | (Note: 53.7132°N 1.7455°W) |
| West Yorkshire | Cleckheaton | 58.6 | 94.3 | 26 | M606 – Bradford; A58 – Halifax, Leeds A638 – Liversedge | (Note: 53.7366°N 1.7263°W) |
| West Yorkshire | Leeds | 62.6 | 100.8 | 27 | M621 – Leeds A650 – Morley, Tingley, Bradford; A62 – Birstall, Leeds | (Note: 53.7476°N 1.6379°W) |
| West Yorkshire | Leeds | 65.7 | 105.7 | 28 | A650 – Morley, Tingley A653 – Leeds, Dewsbury | (Note: 53.7335°N 1.5765°W) |
| West Yorkshire | Leeds | 68.4 | 110.1 | 29 | M1 – Sheffield, London, Leeds | (Note: 53.7308°N 1.5118°W) |
| West Yorkshire | — | 70.6 | 113.7 | 30 | A642 – Oulton, Wakefield | (Note: 53.7284°N 1.4582°W) |
| West Yorkshire | Castleford | 73.7 | 118.7 | 31 | A655 – Wakefield Castleford; Castleford Road – Normanton | (Note: 53.7089°N 1.3957°W) |
| West Yorkshire | Castleford | 76.5 | 123.1 | 32 | A639 – Pontefract, Castleford | (Note: 53.7082°N 1.3311°W) |
| West Yorkshire | Castleford | 78.2 | 125.8 | 32a | A1(M) – Wetherby, Newcastle upon Tyne, Doncaster, Peterborough, London | (Note: 53.7116°N 1.2906°W) |
| West Yorkshire | Knottingley | 79.7 | 128.3 | 33 | A162 – Knottingley, Tadcaster; Ferrybridge services | (Note: 53.6957°N 1.2675°W) |
| North Yorkshire | — | 84.4 | 135.8 | 34 | A19 – Eggborough, York, Whitley, Doncaster | (Note: 53.6937°N 1.1553°W) |
| East Riding of Yorkshire | — | 92.2 | 148.4 | 35 | M18 – Doncaster, Sheffield | (Note: 53.6833°N 0.9687°W) |
| East Riding of Yorkshire | Goole | 95.1 | 153.0 | 36 | A161 – Goole A614 – Rawcliffe, Goole | (Note: 53.7060°N 0.9099°W) |
| East Riding of Yorkshire | — | 97.8 | 157.3 | 37 | A614 – Howden | (Note: 53.7344°N 0.8660°W) |
| East Riding of Yorkshire | — | 106.0 | 170.6 | 38 | A63 – Brough, Hull; B1230 – Newport, North Cave | Road continues as A63 (Note: 53.7711°N 0.6768°W) |
1.000 mi = 1.609 km; 1.000 km = 0.621 mi: Concurrency terminus; Incomplete access

Coordinate list

M62 motorway junctions
| mile | km | Westbound exits (B Carriageway) | Junction | Eastbound exits (A Carriageway) |
| | | No access (on-slip only) | J4 | Knotty Ash, Childwall, Broadgreen, A5080; Non-motorway traffic |
| | | End of motorway Road continues as A5080 towards Liverpool | J4 | Start of motorway |
| | | Knotty Ash, Huyton A5080 | J5 | Huyton A5080 |
| 7.9 | 12.7 | Liverpool (S) & A5300, Huyton A5080; Southport M57 | J6 | Prescot M57, Runcorn, M56 A5300 |
| 10.2 | 16.5 | Widnes A557, Prescot A57, St. Helens A570 | J7 | St. Helens A570, Warrington A57, Widnes A557 |
| | | Entering Merseyside | | Entering Cheshire |
| 14.5 | 23.3 | Warrington (West) (A574); Burtonwood services | J8; Services | Warrington (West) (A574); Burtonwood services |
| 16.6 | 26.7 | Warrington, Newton A49 | J9 | Warrington (Central), Newton A49 |
| 16.6 | 26.7 | Warrington, Newton A49 | J9 | Start of variable speed limit |
| 18.1 | 29.1 | End of variable speed limit | J10 | Preston M6(N); Birmingham, Manchester (S) & M6(S) |
| 18.1 | 29.1 | Birmingham, Chester (M56) M6(S); Preston M6(N) | J10 | Preston M6(N); Birmingham, Manchester (S) & M6(S) |
| 20.7 | 33.4 | Warrington (East), Birchwood A574 | J11 | Warrington (East), Birchwood A574 |
| | | Entering Cheshire | | Entering Greater Manchester |
| 26.9 | 43.3 | Start of motorway | J12 | Manchester M60(S&E); Manchester City Centre, Salford M602 |
| | | Concurrency with M60 | | |
| 35.1 | 56.5 | Ring Road (E & S), Manchester (E & C), Manchester M60(E); Blackburn, Bury M66 | J18 | Start of motorway |
| 37.8 | 60.9 | Birch services | Services | Birch services |
| 40.1 | 64.5 | Middleton, Heywood A6046 | J19 | Middleton, Heywood A6046 |
| 42.5 | 68.4 | Start of variable speed limit | J20 | Rochdale, Oldham A627(M) |
| 42.5 | 68.4 | Rochdale, Oldham A627(M) | J20 | End of variable speed limit |
| 43.7 | 70.3 | Milnrow, Shaw (A640) | J21 | Milnrow, Shaw (A640) |
| | | Rakewood Viaduct | | |
| | | Entering Greater Manchester | | Entering West Yorkshire |
| 46.8 | 75.4 | Saddleworth A672 | J22 | Ripponden, Saddleworth A672, Sowerby Bridge (A58) |
| 54.0 | 86.9 | No access (on-slip only) | J23 | Huddersfield (West) A640 |
| 55.5 | 89.4 | Huddersfield, Halifax A629 | J24 | Huddersfield, Halifax A629 |
| 59.1 | 95.2 | End of variable speed limit | J25 | Brighouse, Dewsbury A644 |
| 59.1 | 95.2 | Huddersfield (A62), Brighouse A644 | J25 | Start of variable speed limit |
| 60.6 | 97.7 | Hartshead Moor services | Services | Hartshead Moor services |
| 62.5 | 100.7 | Halifax A58; Bradford M606 | J26 | Cleckheaton A638; Bradford, Leeds Bradford M606 |
| 66.5 | 107.1 | Batley A62 | J27 | Batley A62; Leeds M621 |
| 69.7 | 112.2 | Leeds, Leeds/Bradford, Dewsbury A653 | J28 | Dewsbury A653 |
| 72.3 | 116.5 | The SOUTH M1(S); Leeds (M621) M1(N) | J29 | The NORTH, Leeds M1(N); The SOUTH, Wakefield M1(S) |
| | | Start of variable speed limit | J30 | Rothwell, Wakefield A642 |
| | | Wakefield, Rothwell A642 | J30 | End of variable speed limit |
| 77.7 | 125.2 | Normanton, Castleford A655 | J31 | Castleford, Normanton A655 |
| 80.5 | 129.7 | Pontefract, Castleford A639 | J32 | Pontefract, Castleford A639 |
| | | The NORTH, Wetherby A1(M) | J32A | The NORTH, The SOUTH A1(M) |
| 84.7 | 136.4 | The SOUTH A1, Pontefract A645; Ferrybridge services | J33 | Ferrybridge A162; Ferrybridge services |
| | | Entering West Yorkshire | | Entering North Yorkshire |
| | | Selby, Doncaster A19 | J34 | Selby, Doncaster A19 |
| | | Entering North Yorkshire | | Entering East Riding of Yorkshire |
| | | The SOUTH, Doncaster M18, Scunthorpe, Humberside, Doncaster Sheffield (M180) | J35 | The SOUTH M18, Scunthorpe, Humberside, Doncaster Sheffield (M180) |
| | | Goole A614 | J36 | Goole A614 |
| | | Ouse Bridge | | |
| | | Howden A614, Selby (A63) | J37 | Bridlington, York, Howden A614 |
| | | Start of motorway | J38 | North Cave, Gilberdyke |
| | | Newport B1230; Non-motorway traffic | J38 | End of motorway Road continues as A63 towards Hull |
1.000 mi = 1.609 km; 1.000 km = 0.621 mi: Concurrency terminus; Incomplete access

Data from driver location signs is used to provide distance and carriageway identifier information.
