= Windy Hill (Pennines) =

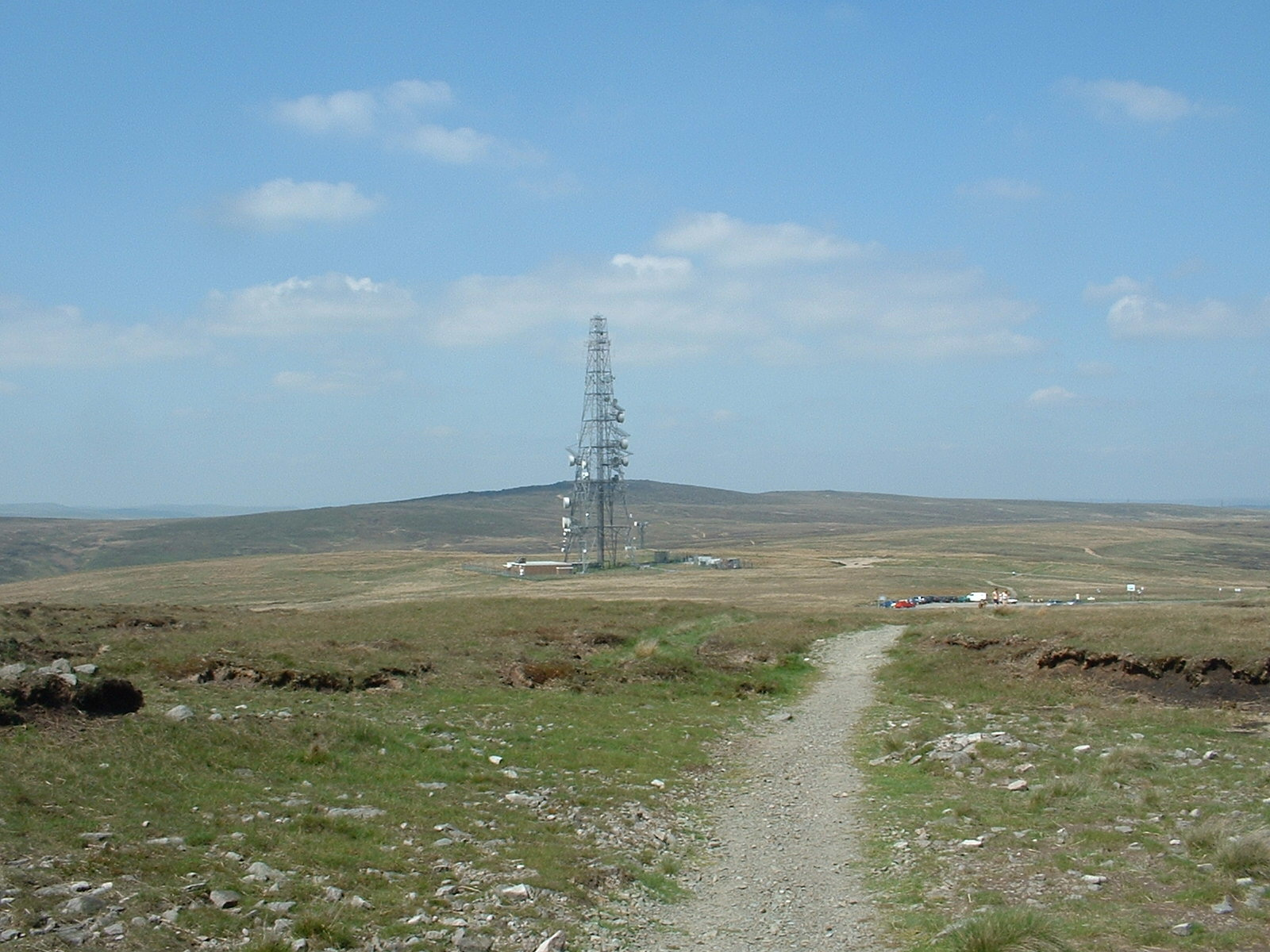

Highest point
- Elevation: 389 m (1,276 ft)
- Coordinates: 53.623645°N 2.040071°W

Geography
- Location within Greater Manchester
- Location: Milnrow, Greater Manchester, England
- Parent range: Pennines
- OS grid: SD973141

Climbing
- Easiest route: Pennine Way

Windy Hill in the South Pennines within the Metropolitan Borough of Rochdale in Greater Manchester, England, rises to 389 m (1,276 ft) metres above sea level.

The hill is located west of the A672 road and south west of Junction 22 on the M62 motorway. Windy Hill cutting is up to 120 ft (37 m) deep and the longest on the M62. A pedestrian footbridge, 320 ft (98 m) long and 65 ft (20 m) above the carriageways, carries the Pennine Way above Windy Hill cutting. Its parabolic arch and splayed legs are designed to withstand wind speeds up to 120 mph. Snow lies on Windy Hill for an average of 35 days annually and the area is prone to fog or low cloud. The boundary stone between Greater Manchester and West Yorkshire is in the cutting. The Longden End Brook rises between the hill and the motorway and the Piethorne Brook drains to reservoirs to the southwest. A radio transmitter, part of the British Telecom microwave network, is located to the east.
