= Scammonden Reservoir =

Reservoir in West Yorkshire, England

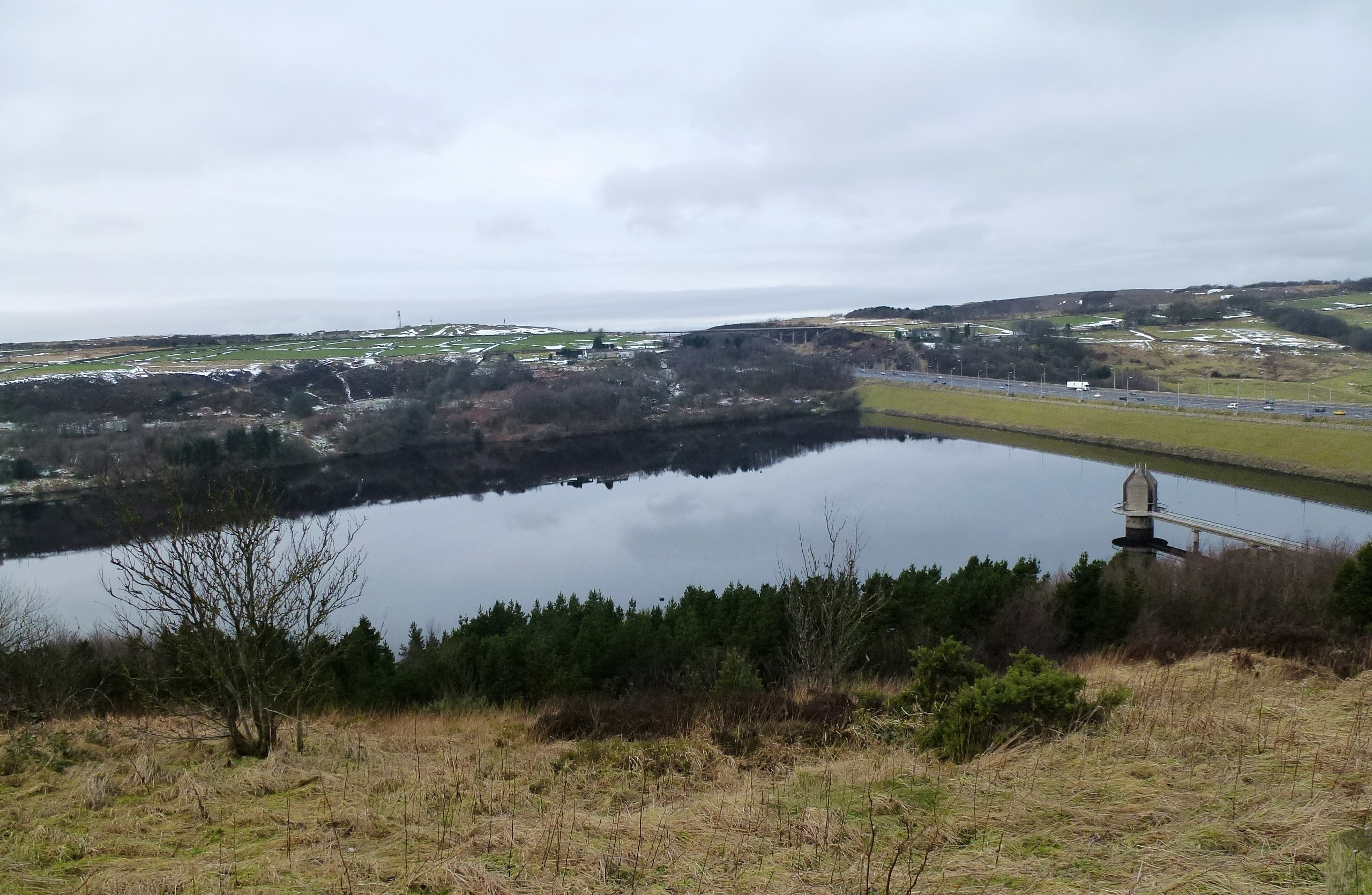
- Scammonden Reservoir and the M62

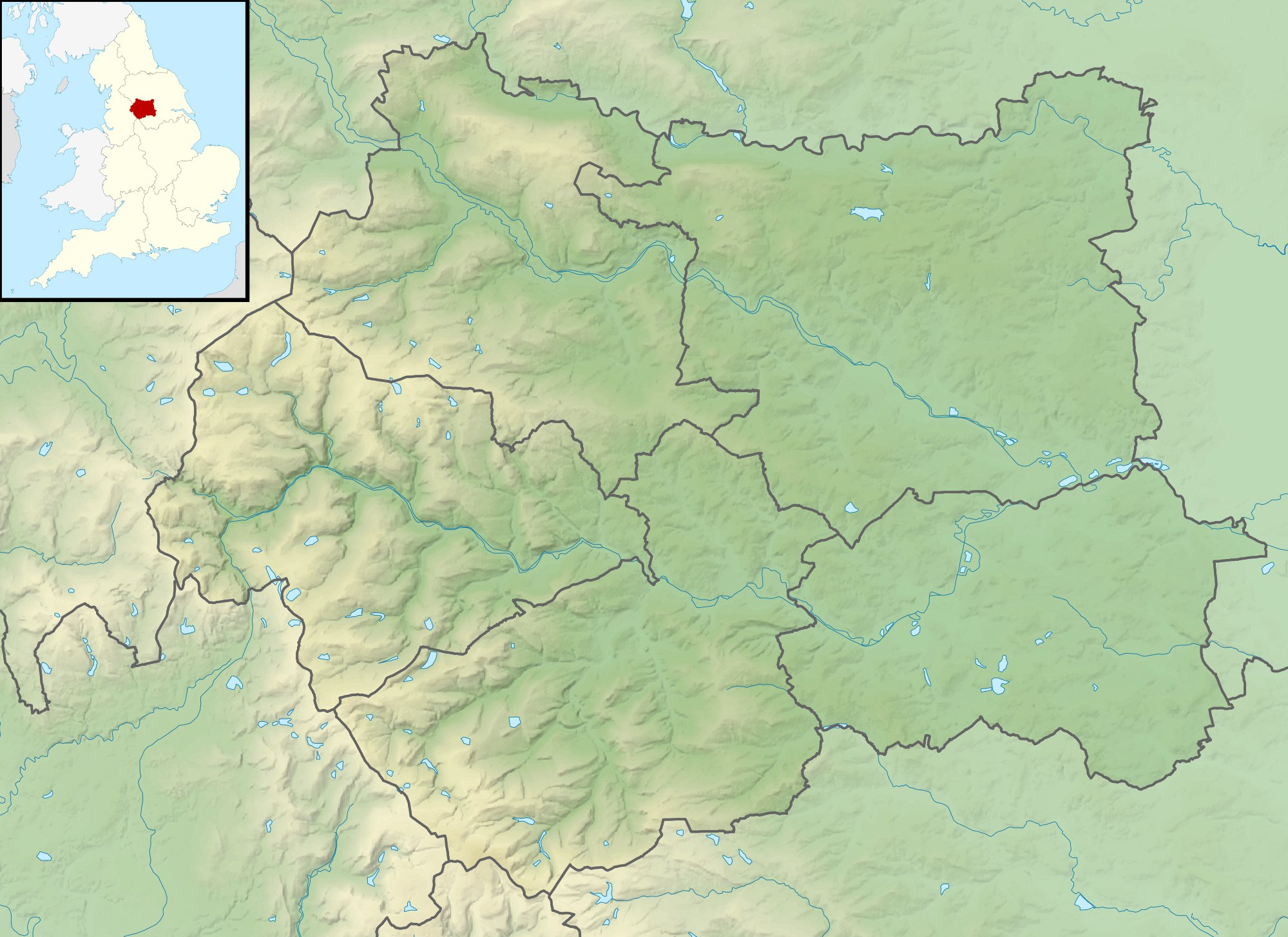
- Location within West Yorkshire
- Location: West Yorkshire
- Coordinates: 53°38′30″N 1°55′26″W
- Type: reservoir
- Basin countries: United Kingdom
- Surface area: 42 hectares (0.16 sq mi)
- Surface elevation: 252 metres (827 ft)

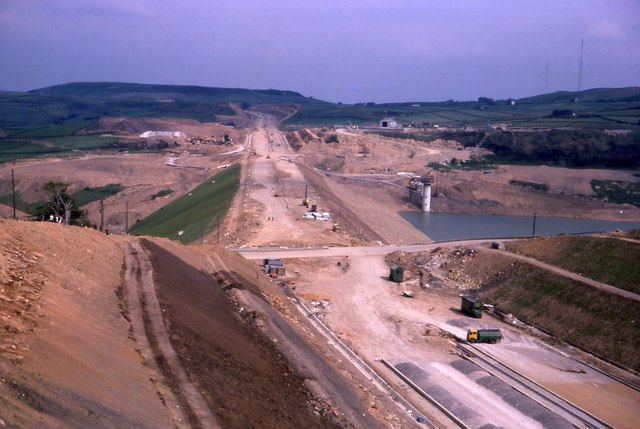
Scammonden Dam under construction in 1970

Scammonden Reservoir is a water reservoir in West Yorkshire, England. Its water surface area when full is 42 hectares (0.16 sq mi). The level of the bellmouth overflow above sea level is 252 metres (827 ft). The reservoir holds 78,000,000,000 litres (1.7×10^{10} imp gal; 2.1×10^{10} US gal). Its length is 1.4 kilometres (0.9 mi).

== History ==
Scammonden Dam is part of the M62 motorway between junctions 22 and 23, the only such structure in Britain. Its construction by the Ministry of Transport and Huddersfield Corporation Waterworks required the passing of the Huddersfield Corporation Act 1965. The motorway dam spans the Deanhead Valley in the Pennines between Huddersfield and Rochdale and the main contractor for the project was Sir Alfred McAlpine & Sons. Deanhead village was submerged and many buildings demolished to make way for the reservoir but the church remains and its vicarage is used by the sailing club. Both the church and adjacent school were at risk of slipping down the hillside into the dam and were not used after 1971 when the motorway opened. The church was renovated in 2002 and the old schoolhouse has been converted into a private dwelling.

Surveying began in November 1961 and the route of the carriageway was determined in mid 1963. Excavation in the Deanhead Valley commenced the following year and for the dam in 1966. This required the removal of 713,000 cubic metres (25,200,000 cu ft) of peat bog to reach the solid rock base nearly 13 metres (43 ft) below ground level. Material excavated elsewhere on the line of the motorway, clay from cuttings between Lofthouse and Gildersome, and 3.4 million cubic metres from the Deanhead excavations was used to build the dam's embankment which is 625 metres (2,051 ft) in length and 63.1 metres (207 ft) above the original valley floor. The 3.6 million cubic metre embankment is 435 metres (1,427 ft) wide at its base and 55 metres (180 ft) at road level.

Scammonden Water is 51.8 metres (170 ft) at its deepest point and water is drawn-off through a 2.5 kilometres (1.6 mi) tunnel driven southwards to supply Huddersfield. The overflow bellmouth, next to the valve shaft superstructure, discharges water to the valley below via a tunnel in the valley on the reservoir's eastern side. The reservoir started to fill in July 1969 and the area was landscaped and parking and other facilities were provided.

The motorway, which was dependent on the completion of the dam, was opened to traffic on 20 December 1970 and officially opened by Queen Elizabeth II who unveiled a plaque near the valve tower of Scammonden Water on 14 October 1971.

== Leisure activities ==
The reservoir is home to Scammonden Water Sailing Club or SWSC. The sailing club has the exclusive rights to the water, which means that the activities on the water are either dingy cruising or racing. Other activities occasionally take place usually under the auspices of the scouts.

Huddersfield Scout Sailing is a Royal Yachting Association Training Centre run by volunteers for scouts and guides. There is also a scouting activity centre located at the water's edge which also holds the boat workshop for scout sailing.

== Scammonden Steps ==
Close to the reservoir, at the other side of the motorway and dam wall, Scammonden steps comprises five flights of steps up the hillside from the valley below. Totaling 458 steps, the cumulative step count when ascending each of the five flights is 95, 200, 287, 363 then 458.

== Sources ==
- Gray, Tony (1987). The Road to Success: Alfred McAlpine 1935–1985. Rainbird Publishing.
