= Charnock Richard services =

Motorway service area in Lancashire, England

Charnock Richard Services
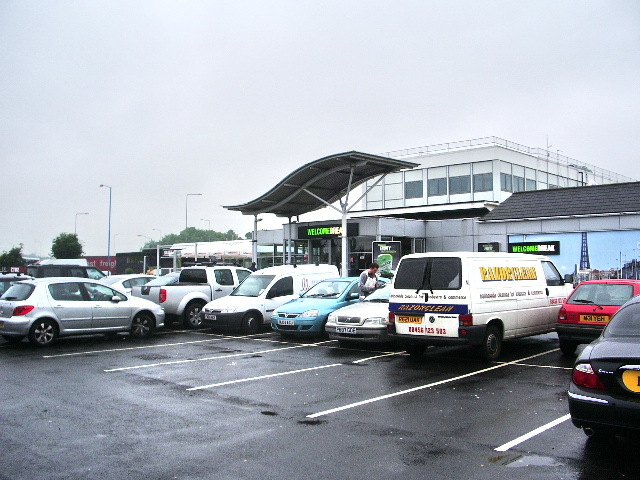
- Main building (2007)

- Location in Lancashire, England Location in Chorley Borough, Lancashire Location on the UK motorway network

Information
- County: Lancashire
- Road: M6
- Coordinates: 53.6304°N 2.6918°W
- Operator: Welcome Break
- Previous operator: Trust House Forte
- Date opened: 1963
- Website: welcomebreak.co.uk/locations/charnock-richard/

Charnock Richard Services is a motorway service area between junctions 27 and 28 of the M6 in England. The services are in the Lancashire borough of Chorley and were the first on the M6 when they opened in 1963. Originally operated by Trust House Forte, the services are currently operated by Welcome Break.

== History ==
In August 1961, the contract was awarded to Motorway Services, owned by Blue Star Garages and Forte. The nearby 29-mile (47 km) mile £24 million section of M6 opened on 29 July 1963, from Preston to Lymm, making the M6 now 65 miles (105 km). It was the first motorway service area to have a restaurant on the bridge over the motorway. The Thelwall Viaduct opened on the same day. The motorway section largely replaced the A49, which passed north-south next to the services. Background music was supplied by Moodmaster of Romford.

Another service area on the 29-mile section was planned for Newton le Willows, to the north-east of the town, which is now part-built, with a signpost for 'Works unit'; the services was to have been called Haydock Park services.

Keele services was an exact copy of Charnock Richard; Keele opened on 15 November 1963.

A 72-bed motel costing £176,000, was built by Alfred McAlpine from 1969, which became an Excelsior Motor Lodge.

== Design ==
The services complex was designed by Terence Verity of Verity Associates.

The fast-food restaurants are located on the bridge over the motorway, rather than restaurants on each side. The bridge restaurant, which had been converted to a Little Chef, was removed in the late 1990s and replaced with Burger King and KFC units at opposite ends of the bridge with a seating area in the middle. This layout remains the same today.

The southbound side has an unusual layout for motorway service areas in the UK, insofar as the fuel forecourt is sited at the top of the entry slip road, on arrival at the complex. The more commonly used layout places the fuel forecourt as the last facility before motorists rejoin the motorway. The design of motorway service areas was still experimental at the time the site was built in the early 1960s, and this arrangement was not repeated.

== Satisfaction ==
The 2019 Motorway Services User Survey found that the southbound side of Charnock Richard was in the worst five motorway services in the United Kingdom for customer satisfaction.

The 2022 Transport Focus survey calculated a 93% satisfaction score for the northbound services and 83% for the southbound services, making it the third-worst in the UK.

Next southbound: Lymm (Truckstop); Knutsford (full services)	Motorway service stations on the M6 motorway	Next northbound: Lancaster (Forton)
