= Hollins Lane =

Village in Lancashire, England

Coordinates: 53.953°N 2.766°W

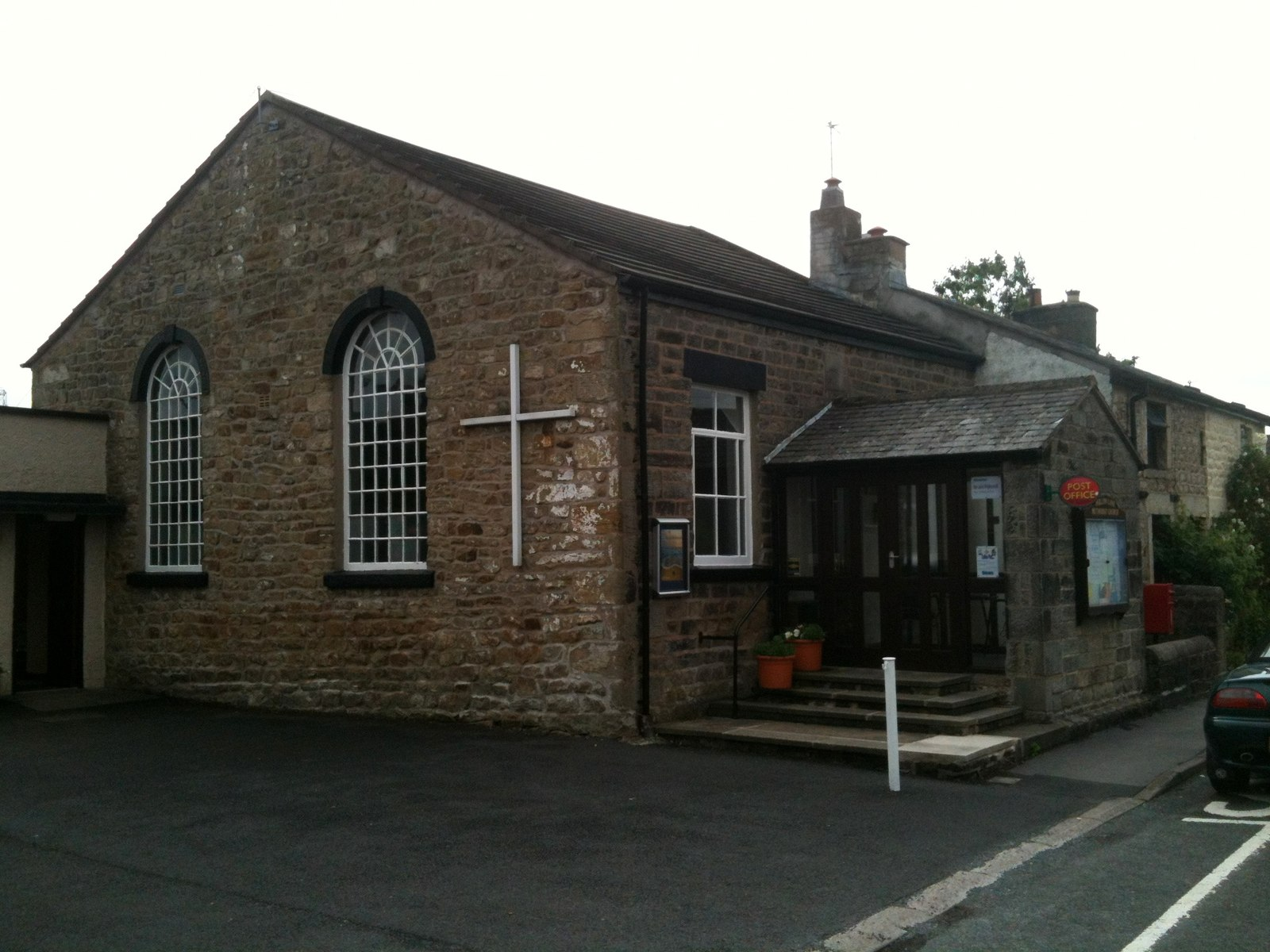
- Church and Post Office, Hollins Lane

- Shown within Wyre Borough Location within Lancashire
- OS grid reference: SD496511
- Civil parish: Forton
- District: Wyre
- Shire county: Lancashire
- Region: North West
- Country: England
- Sovereign state: United Kingdom
- Post town: PRESTON
- Postcode district: PR3
- Dialling code: 01524
- Police: Lancashire
- Fire: Lancashire
- Ambulance: North West
- UK Parliament: Lancaster and Fleetwood

Hollins Lane is a village in the civil parish of Forton, in the Wyre district, in the English county of Lancashire. The village has the Lancaster and Preston Junction Railway running through it but there is no station.

== Amenities ==
Hollins Lane has a place of worship, a post office and a pub, the New Holly.

== Nearby settlements ==
Nearby settlements include the town of Garstang, the village of Forton and the hamlet of Shireshead.

== Transport ==
For transport there is the M6 motorway and the A6 road nearby.
