= Listed buildings in Forton, Lancashire =

Forton is a civil parish in the Wyre district of Lancashire, England. It contains 25 listed buildings that are recorded in the National Heritage List for England. All the listed buildings are designated at Grade II, the lowest of the three grades, which is applied to "buildings of national importance and special interest". The parish contains the village of Forton, and is otherwise mainly rural. The Lancaster Canal passes through the parish, and two bridges crossing it are listed. Also passing through the parish is the M6 motorway, and tower and former restaurant at Lancaster (Forton) Services are listed. The other listed buildings include houses and cottages, farmhouses and farm buildings, churches and associated structures, a medieval cross base, milestones, boundary stones, a war memorial, and a former school.

== Buildings ==
Name and location	Photograph	Date	Notes
Cross base 53.94729°N 2.79686°W	—	Medieval	The cross base is in sandstone and consists of a boulder with a roughly rectangular plan and a rectangular socket.
8, 9 and 10 Hollins Lane; 53.95104°N 2.77133°W	—	1714	Originally one house, later divided into three, they are in sandstone, partly rendered, with a slate roof. The houses have two storeys and each house has one bay. Most of the windows on the front are sashes, and there is a mullioned window at the rear. The doorway to No. 9 has a moulded surround and an inscribed shaped lintel.
Tomb of James Aray; 53.95450°N 2.78116°W	—	1721 (probable)	The tomb is in the churchyard of the United Reformed Church. It is a sandstone tomb chest on a low base. On the top is an inscription.
Clifton Hill Home Farmhouse; 53.95612°N 2.79405°W	—	1742	A sandstone house with a tile roof in two storeys and three bays. The windows are mullioned. The former doorway in the centre bay has been converted into a window.
Milestone; 53.96490°N 2.76905°W	—	18th century	The milestone is in sandstone and has a rounded top. Its front is inscribed with "6".
Richmond Grove Farmhouse; 53.94812°N 2.79721°W	—	1752	The farmhouse is in rendered stone with a slate roof. It has two storeys and two bays. The windows are sashes, and the central doorway has a slightly chamfered surround and a modern porch. Above it is an oval inscribed plaque. At the rear is a cross window.
United Reformed Church; 53.95460°N 2.78129°W		1760	Built as a Congregational Church, it was altered in 1870 and in the 1920s. The church is in sandstone with chamfered quoins and slate roofs. On the north front is a gabled porch, and this is flanked by gabled bays. The windows have round heads with impost bands and keystones. At the east end are two gables, each containing a window.
The Gables; 53.94709°N 2.79230°W	—	Mid to late 18th century	The house contains material remaining from the 17th century. It is in pebbledashed stone with sandstone dressings and a slate roof, and has two storeys and three bays. The windows are sashes, and the doorway has a stone surround and a cornice hood.
Canal Cottage; 53.96386°N 2.78757°W	—	Late 18th century	Originally two houses, later converted into one dwelling, it is in sandstone with a slate roof. There are three storeys and two bays. The windows are sashes with plain surrounds. The doorways are paired, between the bays, and the right one is now glazed.
Old limekiln 53.94550°N 2.78764°W	—	1797 (possible)	The limekiln is built against the bank of the Lancaster Canal. It is in sandstone and has a roughly rectangular plan. Its top is grassed over, and there is a blocked opening with a timber lintel.
Richmond Bridge; 53.96411°N 2.78740°W	—	1797 (or later)	This is bridge No. 80 over the Lancaster Canal. It is an accommodation bridge in sandstone and consists of a single elliptical arch. The bridge has keystones and solid parapets with rounded tops.
Potters Brook Bridge; 53.96715°N 2.78203°W		1797	This is bridge No. 80 over the Lancaster Canal, and carries Potters Brook Road over the canal. It is in sandstone and consists of a single elliptical arch. The bridge has keystones and solid parapets with rounded tops.
Forton Lodge; 53.94596°N 2.77995°W	—	c. 1800	A sandstone house with a hipped slate roof, in two storeys and three bays. On the front are a plinth, a band, and a cornice. The windows are sashes, and in the left bay is a canted bay window with an embattled parapet. The central round-headed doorway has a fanlight and two detached fluted columns.
St Paul's Church; 53.95426°N 2.76064°W	—	1805	The former church, later used for other purposes, is in sandstone with quoins and a slate roof. At the west end is a double bellcote, and two doorways. There is a north gabled porch, and a lancet window on each side of it containing Gothick tracery. The east window contains Y-tracery.
Clifton Hill and chapel 53.95435°N 2.79401°W	—	1820	A country house later divided into two dwellings, in sandstone with hipped slate roofs. It has two storeys and consists of a central block with links to flanking pavilions. The central block has a two-bay pedimented projection, and one bay on each side. In the centre is an elliptical porch with two Ionic columns and an entablature. The doorway has an architrave and the windows are sashes. Attached to the southwest is a former Roman Catholic chapel, built in 1878. This has a pair of gables on the front, round-headed windows along the sides, and a gallery inside.
Milestone; 53.96571°N 2.77868°W		Early 19th century (probable)	The milestone is in sandstone. It has a circular base and is triangular above. The base is inscribed "FORTON". On the sides are cast iron plates indicating the distances in miles to Lancaster and to Garstang.
The Grey House; 53.94676°N 2.79208°W	—	Early 19th century	The house is in sandstone with a slate roof, and has two storeys and three bays. The windows are sashes. The doorway has a fanlight with an elliptical head, and a doorcase with attached Doric columns. On the right return is a two-storey stair projection containing a round-headed stair window.
Richmond Grove House; 53.94809°N 2.79707°W	—	Early to mid 19th century	A sandstone house with a slate roof, in two storeys and three bays. On the front are a band, a cornice and a blocking course. The windows are sashes with plain reveals. In the centre is a Doric porch with pilaster responds.
Former school 53.95470°N 2.78148°W		1836	The former school is in the churchyard of the United Reformed Church. It is in sandstone with a slate roof, and has two storeys. The north wall contains a wide entrance with a quoined surround, and in the upper floor are two sash windows with plain surrounds. In the south wall are doorways on in each floor, the upper door approached by external stone steps with iron railings.
Boundary stone 53.96030°N 2.80675°W	—	Mid-19th century	The boundary stone is adjacent to the north parapet of Cocker House Bridge, and it marks the boundary of the parish with that of Cockerham. It is in sandstone, with a semi-octagon plan, and an ogee top. The left side is inscribed "LONSDALE SOUTH", and the other" AMOUNDERNESS".
Boundary Stone; 53.94273°N 2.77617°W	—	19th century	The stone marks the boundary between the parishes of Cabus and Forton. It is in sandstone and has a triangular plan. Its faces are inscribed with "CABUS" AND "CLEVELEY".
Boundary stone 53.96625°N 2.77914°W	—	19th century	The stone marks the boundary of the parish with that of Ellel, and stands on the west side of the A6 road. It is in sandstone, and has a triangular plan with a chamfered top. It is inscribed with the names of the parishes.
Mounting block 53.95487°N 2.78149°W	—	19th century	The mounting block is in the churchyard wall of the United Reformed Church. It is in sandstone, and has four steps on the south side of the wall, and a slab projecting through a gap in the wall.
Forton, Cleveley and Holleth War Memorial; 53.95500°N 2.78164°W		1921	The war memorial stands in a small garden by a road junction, it is in grey and buff sandstone, and consists of a wheelhead cross about 2.9 metres (9 ft 6 in) tall. The cross has a slightly tapering shaft, and stands on a plinth and a circular base. On the front of the cross is a tablet with interlace decoration, on the front of the shaft is a relief carving of a shield and a crown, and below this is an inscription. On the plinth are the names of those lost in the two World Wars.
Former Pennine Tower Restaurant; 53.96170°N 2.76003°W		1964–65	The tower is part of Lancaster (Forton) Services on the north-bound side of the M6 motorway. It is built in reinforced concrete, and consists of a tower 22 metres (72 ft) high with a cantilevered hexagonal restaurant and sun deck carried on a hexagonal stalk. The walls are coated with corrugated asbestos sheeting. The tower shaft contains two passenger lifts, three service lists and a curved staircase.
