= Terence Verity =

British art director and architect (1913–1967)

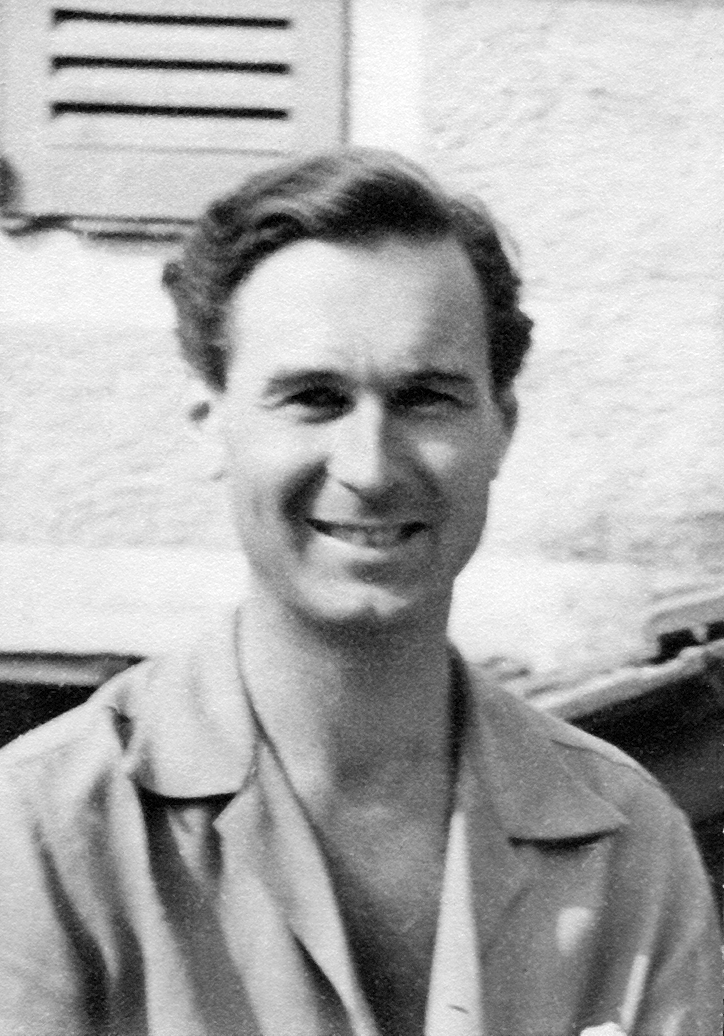
- Born: 14 December 1913; Cove, Hampshire, England
- Died: 15 October 1967 (aged 53); Al Karak, Jordan
- Occupations: Art director, architect
- Years active: 1943-1967
- Children: 5, including Simon Verity

Terence Verity (14 December 1913 – 15 October 1967) was a British Art director and architect.

== Life and work ==
Terence Verity was one of the foremost art directors of early post-war Britain. He started working in films in 1943, having had a formal architectural training at the AA School. He was born into an illustrious architectural family, his grandfather being Thomas Verity (1836 – 1891) and his uncle, Frank Verity (1864 – 1937), some of the finest designers of theatres and cinemas of their time. In addition, his maternal uncle was the architect, Oliver Hill (1887 – 1968), celebrated for designing the British Pavilion at the Paris Exposition of 1937 and for his grand country houses.

After graduation, Terence Verity worked for his uncles for a short while but then moved into the film industry. He started off as a draughtsman in the Art Department of the Associated British Picture Corporation at Elstree Studios. During World War 2 the studios were used by the War Office for storage and there were few films made. Verity’s first film (uncredited) was "Millions Like Us" (1943), directed by Sydney Gilliat and Frank Launder. In 1946 Warner Brothers acquired a substantial interest in ABPC, appointed a new board and built new stages. By this time Verity’s design talent had become noticed and by 1948 he began a series of 24 films as chief art director.

== Career in film production ==
Terence worked with many notable directors, including Terence Young, Alfred Hitchcock, Vincent Sherman, Henry Levin, Michael Anderson and Leslie Norman.

Some of his more significant films were:

- ‘The Hasty Heart’ (1949), directed by Vincent Sherman and starring Ronald Reagan, in his only British film, plus newcomer, Richard Todd who was nominated for an Oscar
- ‘Stage Fright’ (1950), directed by Alfred Hitchcock and starring Marlene Dietrich, Jane Wyman and Richard Todd
- ‘The Dark Avenger’ (1955), directed by Henry Levin and starring Errol Flynn and Peter Finch
- ‘The Devil's Disciple (1959), directed by Guy Hamilton and starring Burt Lancaster, Kirk Douglas and Laurence Olivier.

He sometimes managed to get small parts on some of his films, even doubling for Errol Flynn in one scene, and, another time, doubling for David Niven in a skiing shot.

== Architectural Practice ==
By the early 1960s Terence Verity began to feel that the threat of television would be the death of cinema and he decided to leave the industry and return to his original profession of architecture.

He set up in practice as Verity Associates in Mayfair in partnership with his wife, Enid, an interior designer. He entered the competition for the new cathedral at Coventry, which was eventually won by Sir Basil Spence. During the early ‘60’s, the Ministry of Transport started building the first of the motorways in Britain. Wanting to encourage an unimpeded flow of traffic and reluctant to allow haphazard development, they opted to build service stations. Some of Verity’s first commissions were for two bridge service stations, north and west of Manchester, at Keele and Charnock Richard, on the newly constructed M6 motorway.

Most of the design work for Verity Associates was for large corporate clients.

== Personal life ==
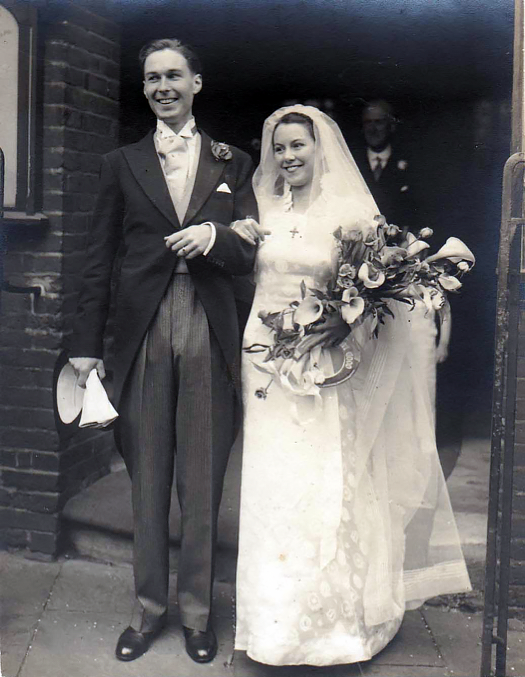
Terence Verity and Enid Hill on their wedding day

Terence Verity was born on 14 December 1913 at Cove Cottage, Cove, Farnborough, in Hampshire, the fifth and youngest child of quantity surveyor, Ernest Verity (1869-1947) by his wife Enid May, née Hill (1871-1918). He was educated at Highgate school, followed by the Architectural Association School of Architecture. The family lived in the Vale of Health at Hampstead in London.

He met his wife, Enid Hill (born 1916; died 19 July 2011) (coincidentally the same maiden name as his mother) at a party when they were both in their mid teens. They became inseparable and were married on 30 April 1938 at Chelsea Old Church.

Terence and Enid Verity had five children, including the artist and sculptor Simon Verity, and lived in a Georgian house on the river near Marsh Lock at Henley-on-Thames. Terence became a Town Councillor there and became very active in local events, helping to establish the Henley Festival, which has since become an annual event.

=== Death ===
In the mid 1960s, Verity Associates accepted some commissions for the royal family in Jordan, notably for a large Sports complex. It was while Terence and his wife, Enid, were in Jordan, doing some research for their project, that he had a fall at the castle of Al Karak in the south of the country. He was airlifted to Amman and died two days later on 15 October 1967. He is buried in the Military Cemetery in Amman.

== Bibliography ==
- Verity, Terence (1966). Want to be an Architect?. London: Leslie Frewin.
