= Forton, Lancashire =

Village in Lancashire, England

Coordinates: 53.954°N 2.781°W

Forton
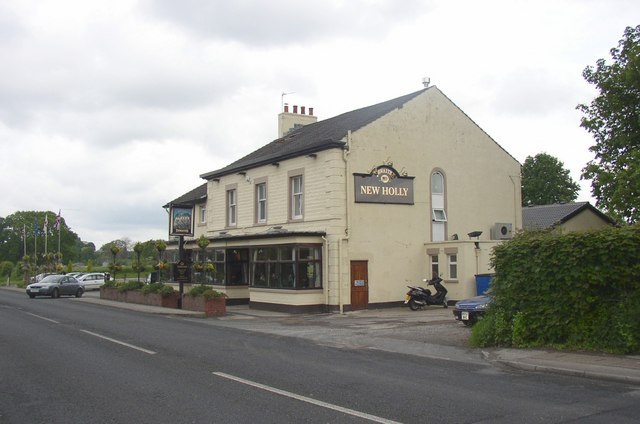
- The New Holly public house, Forton

- Shown within Wyre Borough Location within Lancashire
- Population: 1,484 (2021)
- OS grid reference: SD487512
- Civil parish: Forton
- District: Wyre
- Shire county: Lancashire
- Region: North West
- Country: England
- Sovereign state: United Kingdom
- Post town: PRESTON
- Postcode district: PR3
- Dialling code: 01524
- Police: Lancashire
- Fire: Lancashire
- Ambulance: North West
- UK Parliament: Lancaster and Wyre

Forton is a village and civil parish in the Wyre district of the English county of Lancashire near the Forest of Bowland. It is near the A6 road, between the city of Lancaster and the town of Garstang. Its population as measured at the 2011 census is 1,213. It has one school, Forton Primary School, several churches and one pub, the New Holly.

== Lancaster (Forton) services ==
Lancaster (Forton) services is a motorway service station near Forton, between junctions 32 and 33 of the M6 motorway in England. The nearest city is Lancaster, about seven miles (11 km) to the north. The station is operated by Moto.

== Notable people ==
- Tom Boardman, British auto racing driver

== Transport ==
For transport there is the A6 road and the M6 motorway which has Lancaster (Forton) services on it.

== Nearby settlements ==
Nearby settlements include the city of Lancaster, the town of Garstang, the village of Hollins Lane and the hamlets of Potters Brook and Shireshead.

== Nearby waters ==
Nearby waters include the Lancaster Canal, the River Wyre and Clevelymere.

== See also ==
- Listed buildings in Forton, Lancashire
