= Bridge restaurant =

Restaurant built like a bridge over a road

A bridge restaurant or restaurant bridge is a restaurant, usually indoors, built like a bridge over a road, mostly over freeways or motorways. It usually provides access from both sides of the road without the need of crossing the road by tunnel or footbridge. The construction also attracts the attention of motorists, making it easy to find the rest area.

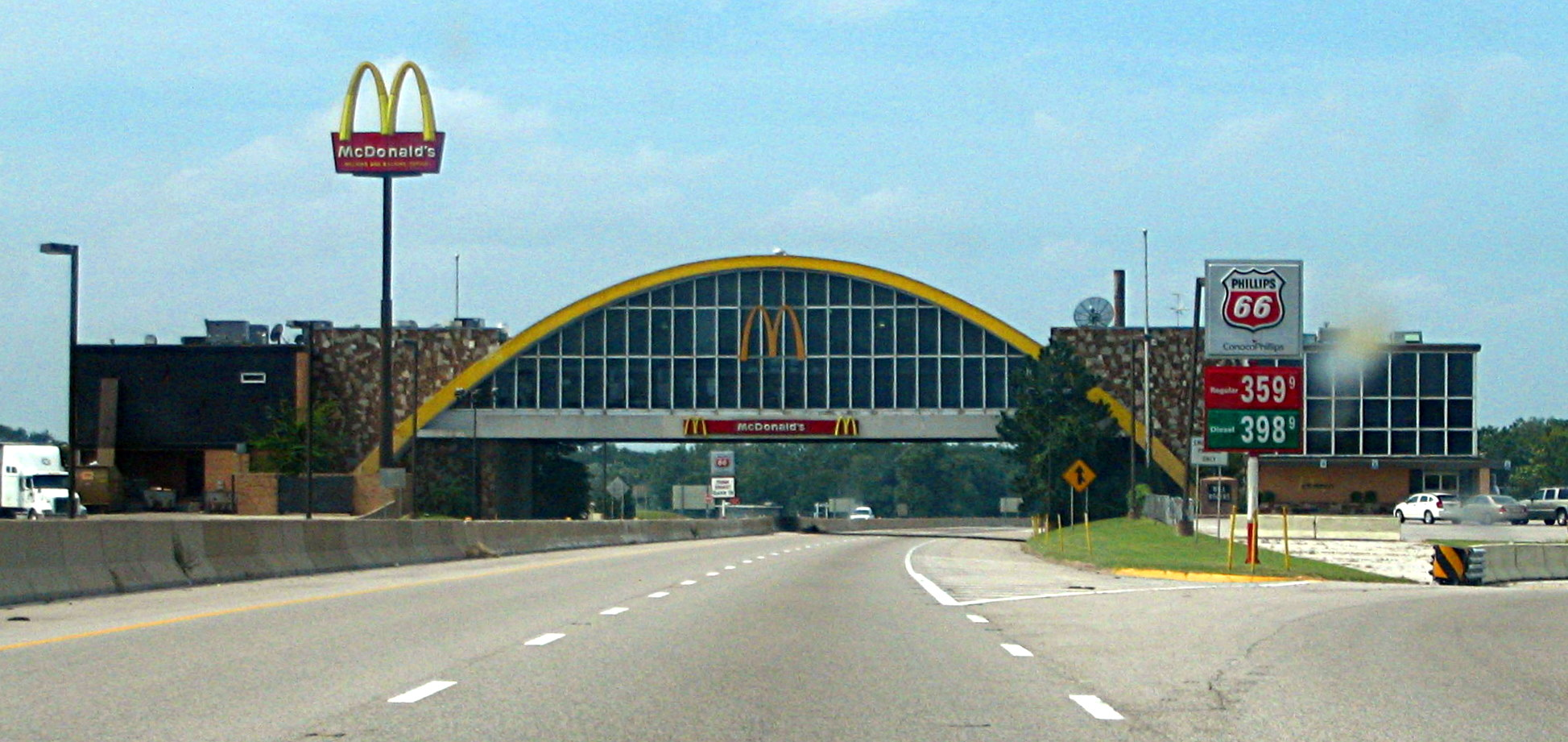
The world's first bridge restaurant, built in 1957 in Vinita, Oklahoma (2008)

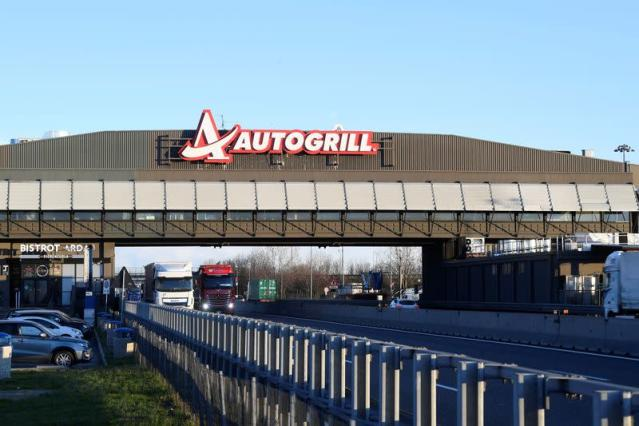
Europe's first bridge restaurant, built in 1959 in Fiorenzuola d'Arda, Italy

== Motorways ==
=== United States ===
The first bridge restaurant was built in 1957, over I-44 (Will Rogers Turnpike) at the Vinita, Oklahoma, rest area. It is currently a McDonald's, Subway fast-food restaurant, and a Kum & Go gas station and was the world's largest until the opening of a larger location in Moscow, Russia. With the construction of the Illinois Tollway in 1958, five more bridge restaurants were built as Illinois Tollway Oases, opening in 1959.

=== Italy ===
The concept was introduced to Europe in 1959 by the Italian architect Angelo Bianchetti, who built the first European bridge restaurant in slightly more than six months. In 1962, Pavesi replaced its existing roadside restaurants at Novara and Bergamo along the Autostrada Serenissima by bridge restaurants at Novara and Osio. This was done in conjunction with the upgrade of the three-lane highway to motorway standards. Bianchetti built nine bridge restaurants for his principal, the Italian food chain Pavesi. Three Pavesi bridges, Chianti, Dorno and Serrevalle-Pistoiese, were built by other architects. The concept was replicated by Pavesi's competitor Motta, who built two bridges at the Cantagallo and Limena rest areas and later on spread over Europe. In 1974 the Italian chains were heavily affected by the oil crisis and as a result, no more bridge restaurants were built in Italy. In 2012 there are 13 bridge restaurants left in Italy. In 2021 the most daring Autogrill in the world (Montepulciano) was demolished due to structural problems after 50 years of service.

=== Rest of Europe ===
Inspired by the Italian example, the concept spread over Europe along with the expansion of motorway networks. Britain's first motorway, the M6 was equipped with motorway service areas (MSA). In contrast to the United States, commercialized rest areas along state-owned motorways are common in Europe. Many of the British MSAs have footbridges for crossing the motorway but only five MSAs were built as bridge restaurants, all in the early 1960s. The M6 got three of them, the fourth was built at Farthing Corner (today Medway) over the M2 and the last at Leicester Forest East over the M1 which opened in 1966. The building of bridge restaurants in Britain stopped because of the fire risks because they were regarded as an obstacle for road widening in the future and because of the finding that drivers do not find any rest when they are still watching the traffic.

In Germany, there are two MSAs built as bridge restaurants. The first opened in 1967 at the Rudolphstein/Hirschberg crossing of the inner German border along the Berlin Munich transit route. Visitors had a view of the iron curtain from the restaurant. The second was built at the Dammer Berge MSA over the A 1 at Holdorf in 1969. Building bridge restaurants in Germany was more expensive than two restaurants at both roadsides. Because of the length of the bridges, many facilities, such as toilets, kitchens, and storage rooms had to be built twice on a bridge, so it turned out that it was too expensive to build further bridge restaurants over the Autobahn. In Belgium the concept is widespread and still applied for new MSAs. At the beginning of the 1970s, Jacques Borel introduced the bridge restaurant to France, and Mövenpick followed soon in Switzerland. The Netherlands followed in 1980 with Rick's, situated at Den Ruygen Hoek MSA near Schiphol. Scandinavia got its first bridge restaurant in the mid-1980s.

== Other roads ==
There are also bridge restaurants beside the motorways. In Oldenzaal (Netherlands) and Berlin (Germany) they are built across broad lanes. The Haus der Deutschen Weinstraße is built over a two-lane road with, as an exception, an entrance at only one roadside. The smallest bridge restaurant is situated in Kufstein (Austria), where a 15th-century service bridge across a street in the old city has been redeveloped to a bridge restaurant with two seats.

== Construction ==
The bridge restaurants in the United States are, except the Lincoln Oasis, more or less replications of the same design based upon a tied-arch bridge. The Lincoln Oasis, designed by David Haid, used a steel frame combined with a glass facade derived from the Italian MSAs at Arda and Cantagallo. The Illinois oasis were renovated in 2003 and have all got a similar look since.

The European bridge restaurants are mostly unique designs. The bridge restaurant should be a landmark and they were designed for their specific operator and location.

=== Steel frame ===
The first two Italian bridge restaurants at Fiorenzuola d'Arda and Cantagallo both got reinforced concrete entry buildings that serve as supports for the steel frame span crossing the carriageways. The bridge restaurant at Cantagallo was destroyed by fire in 1981 and rebuilt as a reinforced concrete bridge.

=== Concrete ===
In 1961 reinforced concrete was introduced for the span itself. Bianchetti designed a reinforced concrete bridge restaurant for the Novara MSA in 1962. Afterward, this design was almost completely copied at Osio MSA, today Brembo. The two in Tuscany, at Serrevalle Pistoiese MSA and Chianti MSA, and the one at Dorno MSA were designed by other architects resulting in unique designs at the different sites. The British bridge restaurants are all built with reinforced concrete and all specially designed for the specific location. In 1963 and 1964 Bianchetti built two specially designed bridge restaurants at the south (Frascati) and north (Feronia) of Rome. Architect Carlo Casati introduced prestressed concrete in his design at Dorno MSA in 1964. A unique design was built by Bega and Nervi at the Limena MSA in 1967. The span has been built as a concrete box with octagonal windows in the walls. In 1969 the German architects Paul Wolters and Manfred Bock combined a prestressed concrete deck with a steel frame top at Dammer Berge MSA.

=== Double deck ===
Bianchetti's next step was the double-deck bridge restaurant with one floor for the restaurant and the other for shops. At Montepulciano, he used the steel frame technique, already implemented at Arda and Cantagallo. The whole design is exceptional because of its cantilever construction that can be seen from the outside. The last bridge restaurant design of Bianchetti is a double-deck concrete bridge that was built at Soave MSA in 1969, just east of Verona and at Alfaterna MSA in 1971, just south of Nocera Inferiore. The upper level at Alfaterna was used as a motel, but this bridge has been demolished. In Switzerland both Würenlos MSA in 1972 and Knonauer Amt MSA in 2009, got a double-deck bridge restaurant as well.

=== Other restaurants ===
Würenlos and Nyköpingsbro are built as cable-stayed bridge. The bridge restaurant in Pratteln, designed by Casoni & Casoni from Basel, is unique for its fiberglass facade. In Scandinavia and Illinois the parking lots are at the same level as the bridge. Except for Frascati, Ayer Keroh, and Petroport, the other bridge restaurants have an entrance on street-level from which the customers enter the bridge by stairs, escalator or elevator.

== List ==
Rest area	Country	Highway	Opened	Coordinates
Auracher Löchl	Austria	Römerhofgasse, Kufstein		47°34′56″N 12°10′5.8″E
Arlon	Belgium	A4		49°38′35.6″N 5°49′41.8″E
Barchon	Belgium	A4		50°39′13.9″N 5°42′38″E
Opzullik	Belgium	A8		50°41′1.4″N 3°53′51.4″E
Orival	Belgium	A7	2001	50°36′53.6″N 4°18′1.3″E
Verlaine	Belgium	A15		50°35′34.6″N 5°18′13.3″E
Wanlin	Belgium	A4	1995	50°8′34.8″N 5°4′43.2″E
Peñaflor	Chile	AP-78	1998	33°38′3.4″S 70°52′8.3″W
Linnatuuli	Finland	Valtatie 3	1992	
Beaune–Merceuil	France	A6	July 24, 1971	46°57′40″N 4°50′11.2″E
Lançon de Provence	France	A7		43°35′21.6″N 5°11′25.2″E
Nemours	France	A6		48°15′45.6″N 2°43′19.2″E
Orléans–Saran	France	A10	1975	47°58′36″N 1°51′32.4″E
Saint Albain	France	A6	October 29, 1970	46°25′10″N 4°51′55.2″E
Verdun Saint Nicolas (Haudiomont)	France	A4		49°7′9.2″N 5°30′34.3″E
Dammer Berge	Germany	A1	1969	52°32′24″N 8°6′49″E
Frankenwald	Germany	A9	1967	50°24′19″N 11°46′25″E
Haus der Deutschen Weinstraße	Germany	Deutsche Weinstraße	1995	49°36′33″N 8°10′53″E
ICC-Berlin	Germany	Messedamm	April 2, 1979	52°30′16″N 13°16′46″E
Sirios - Malakasa	Greece	A1		38°15′21.6″N 23°45′0″E
Alfaterna	Italy	A3	1971	40°43′58.1″N 14°40′44.4″E
Brembo	Italy	A4	1962	45°37′54″N 9°35′55.4″E
Cantagallo	Italy	A1	April 23, 1961	44°27′21.6″N 11°16′48″E
Chianti	Italy	A1	1962	43°43′45.2″N 11°19′59.9″E
Dorno	Italy	A7	May 11, 1964	45°8′52.8″N 8°59′29.4″E
Feronia	Italy	A1	1964	42°8′6.1″N 12°36′7″E
Arda	Italy	A1	December 29, 1959	44°57′44.4″N 9°54′18.4″E
Frascati	Italy	E821	1963	41°49′54.7″N 12°39′23.5″E
Limenella	Italy	A4	April 2, 1967	45°26′54″N 11°50′41″E
Montepulciano	Italy	A1	1967	43°8′9″N 11°51′51.5″E
Novara	Italy	A4	1962	45°28′5.9″N 8°39′24″E
Scaligera	Italy	A4	1969	45°24′38.4″N 11°13′57.8″E
Sebino	Italy	A4	1962	45°35′37.3″N 9°57′53.8″E
Serravalle	Italy	A11	1962	43°53′28.1″N 10°49′31.2″E
La Porta	Italy	via Stalingrado, Bologna	2010	44°30′41.07″N 11°21′26.16″E
Ayer Keroh	Malaysia	E2		2°23′54.5″N 102°13′15.7″E
Subang Jaya	Malaysia	E6		3°1′32.3″N 101°34′32.2″E
Sungai Buloh	Malaysia	E1		3°11′19.3″N 101°35′10.7″E
Den Ruygen Hoek	Netherlands	A4	December 18, 1980	52°15′36″N 4°41′17″E
Oldenzaal	Netherlands			52°17′47.4″N 6°55′25.2″E
Hungsu-ri	North Korea	AH1		38°28′4.1″N 126°4′3.1″E
Holmestrand	Norway	E18		59°30′50.7″N 10°12′10″E
Midrand	South Africa	N1		25°58′49.4″S 28°7′34.6″E
Petroport	South Africa	N1		25°36′59.8″S 28°16′41.8″E
Arrigorriaga	Spain	AP-68		43°11′26″N 2°53′47″W
El Penedes	Spain	E90		41°17′19.3″N 1°35′32.2″E
La Jonquera	Spain	E15		42°24′22.6″N 2°52′21.2″E
La Plana	Spain	E15		39°51′52″N 0°7′21″W
Lleida	Spain	E90		41°32′33.6″N 0°38′15.8″E
Porta Cerdanya	Spain	E9		42°20′44.5″N 1°49′58.3″E
Gävlebro	Sweden	E4	1987	60°38′56″N 17°7′8″E
Nyköpingsbro	Sweden	E4	1986	58°44′56″N 16°55′14.9″E
Knonauer Amt	Switzerland	A4	November 13, 2009	47°16′18.5″N 8°26′16.5″E
Pratteln	Switzerland	A3	October 26, 1978	47°31′39″N 7°42′3″E
Würenlos	Switzerland	A1	1972	47°26′17.5″N 8°20′51″E
Charnock Richard services	United Kingdom	M6	1963	53°37′52.2″N 2°41′28″W
Keele services	United Kingdom	M6	1963	52°59′35″N 2°17′21.9″W
Knutsford services	United Kingdom	M6	1963	53°18′2″N 2°24′6″W
Leicester Forest East services	United Kingdom	M1	1966	52°37′7.4″N 1°12′21.6″W
Medway services	United Kingdom	M2	November 1, 1963	51°20′26.3″N 0°36′26.4″E
Belvidere Oasis	United States	I-90 (Jane Addams Memorial Tollway)	1959	42°14′0.3″N 88°50′4.4″W
Chicago Southland Lincoln Oasis	United States	I-80/I-294 (Tri-State Tollway)	1967	41°34′43.3″N 87°35′56.6″W
Des Plaines Oasis	United States	I-90 (Jane Addams Memorial Tollway)	1959 (closed in 2014)	42°0′52.9″N 87°55′35.3″W
Hinsdale Oasis	United States	I-294 (Tri-State Tollway)	1959	41°47′0.6″N 87°54′28.3″W
Lake Forest Oasis	United States	I-94 (Tri-State Tollway)	1959	42°15′10.6″N 87°54′4.8″W
Will Rogers Archway Vinita, Oklahoma	United States	I-44 (Will Rogers Turnpike)	1957 (remodeled in 2013)	36°37′23.9″N 95°8′52.9″W
O'Hare Oasis	United States	I-294 (Tri-State Tollway)	1959 (closed in 2018)	41°57′2″N 87°52′56.9″W

== On bridges ==
Literally the restaurants on the Novy Most in Bratislava, opened 1972, and the Esplanade Riel in Winnipeg, opened 2003, could be regarded as bridge restaurants, but these bridges are normal river crossings with a restaurant and aren't dedicated bridge restaurants. The Anshun Bridge in Chengdu, opened 2003, features the Veranda bridge restaurant built as a bridge over the river instead of a road. The Serbian town of Valjevo also has a restaurant with a terrace on a purpose built bridge crossing the river at Knez Mihajleva.

== Works cited ==
- Johannes, Ralph; Wölki, Gerhard (2005). Die Autobahn und ihre Rastanlagen - Geschichte und Architektur (in German). Petersberg: Michael Imhof Verlag. ISBN 3-932526-68-6.
- Aleardi, Andrea; Marcetti, Corrado; Vittorini, Alessandra (2011). L'architettura in Toscana dal 1945 ad oggi: una guida alla selezione delle opere di rilevante interesse storico-artistico (in Italian). Firenze: Alinea. ISBN 978-88-605563-1-8.
- Colafranceschi, Simone (2007). Autogrill: una storia Italiana (in Italian). Bologna: Il mulino. ISBN 978-88-151214-4-8.
- Greco, Laura (2010). Architetture Autostradali in Italia (in Italian). Rome: Gangemi. ISBN 978-88-492191-5-9.
