= Rakewood Viaduct =

Viaduct in Greater Manchester, England

Coordinates: 53.6205°N 2.0830°W

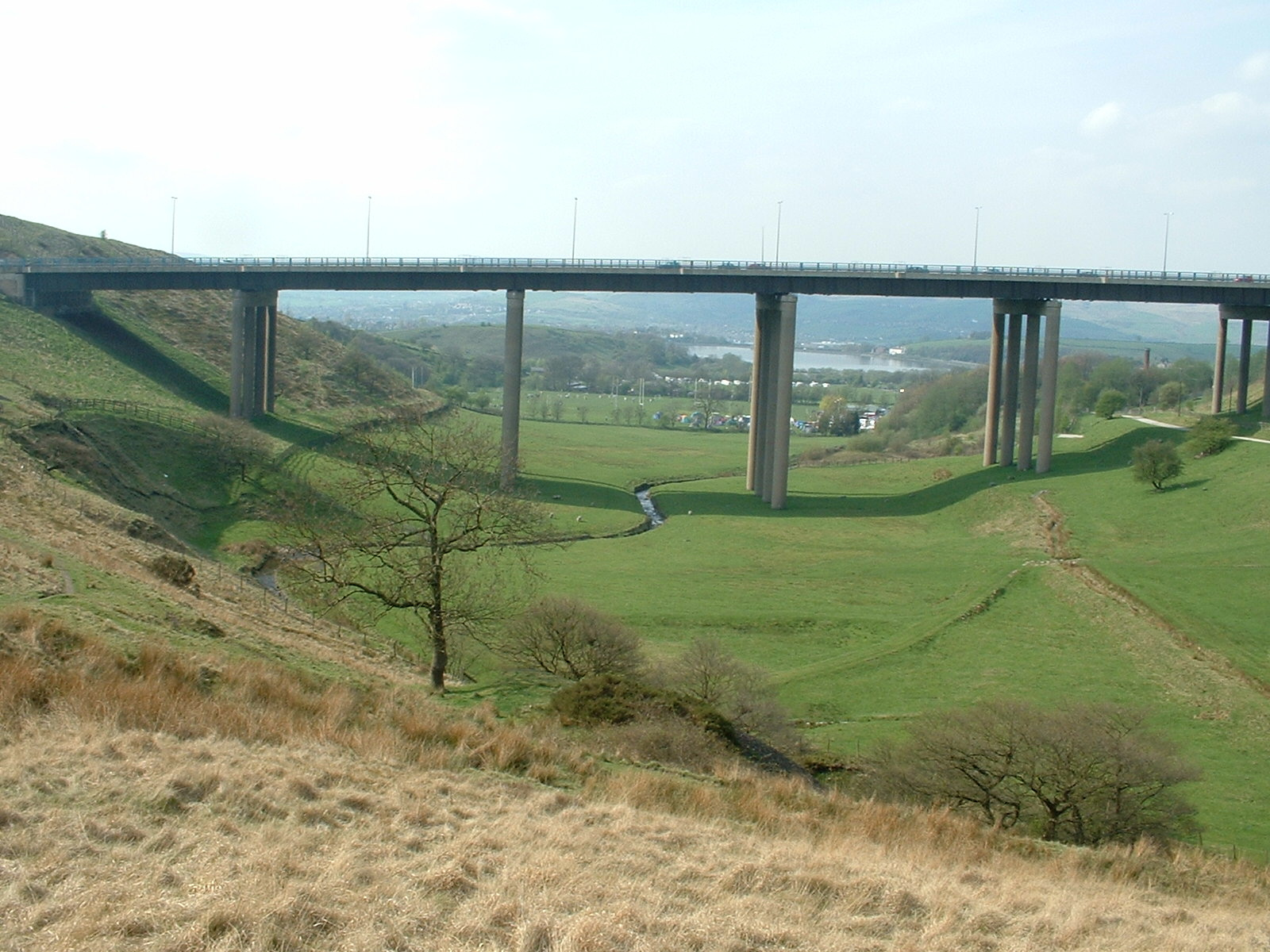
Rakewood Viaduct

The Rakewood Viaduct carries the M62 motorway over Rakewood Valley and Longden End Brook between junctions 21 and 22 at Littleborough, Greater Manchester, England.

The viaduct is 280 yards (260 m) long and 140 ft (43 m) above the valley floor. It was built in 1966 by Reed & Mallik and opened to motorway traffic in October 1971. It has a sister bridge, the Gathurst Viaduct in Wigan, which carries the M6 motorway over the Leeds & Liverpool Canal, the Manchester–Southport line and the River Douglas and was constructed before the Rakewood Viaduct.

The steelwork deck was subcontracted to Robert Watson Steelwork of Bolton.

Because of the height of the bridge and the surrounding hillside exposure, it is often subject to high-speed cross winds.
