= The Rank Organisation =

British entertainment conglomerate

- Type: Public
- Industry: Film and media industry
- Founded: 23 April 1937; 89 years ago as J. Arthur Rank
- Founder: J. Arthur Rank
- Defunct: 7 February 1996; 30 years ago
- Fate: Assets sold to Rank Group; Film assets acquired by Carlton Communications
- Successor: Company: Rank Group; Library: ITV Studios
- Headquarters: London, England, United Kingdom
- Key people: J. Arthur Rank (chairman)
- Products: Film production, distribution and exhibition (diversified: radio, television and photocopying manufacturing, record label)
- Subsidiaries: Rank Audio Visual Multimedia; Rank Records; Top Rank; Top Rank Suite

The Rank Organisation (founded as the J. Arthur Rank Organisation) was a British entertainment conglomerate founded in 1937 by industrialist J. Arthur Rank. It quickly became the largest and most vertically integrated film company in the United Kingdom, owning production, distribution, and exhibition facilities, as well as manufacturing projection equipment and chairs. It diversified into the manufacture of radios, TVs, and photocopiers (as one of the owners of Rank Xerox). The company name lasted until February 1996, when the name and some of the remaining assets were absorbed into the newly structured Rank Group plc. The company itself became a wholly owned subsidiary of Xerox and was renamed XRO Limited in 1997.

The company's logo, the Gongman, first used in 1935 by the group's distribution company, General Film Distributors and seen in the opening titles of the films, became a film emblem.

== Origin ==
The company founder J. Arthur Rank, born in Kingston upon Hull, UK, was already a wealthy industrialist through his father's flour milling business, Joseph Rank Ltd, before making his start in filmmaking by financing short religious subjects in line with his Methodist beliefs. Rank was a Methodist Sunday school teacher and wished to introduce these beliefs to a wider audience.

The Rank Organisation was established, as a means for Rank to consolidate his filmmaking interests, in 1937.

== Filmmaking in the 1940s ==
A loose collective of filmmakers was established by Rank under the banner of Independent Producers including The Archers, consisting of Michael Powell and Emeric Pressburger, Cineguild Productions, consisting of David Lean, Ronald Neame, John Bryan, and Anthony Havelock-Allan, the filmmaking duo of Frank Launder and Sidney Gilliat, and the directors Ken Annakin and Muriel Box.

The Company of Youth, the Rank Organisation's associated acting school often referred to as "The Charm School", was founded in 1945. It launched several careers, including those of Donald Sinden, Dirk Bogarde, Diana Dors, and Christopher Lee.

Although she was not a member of the school, Petula Clark was under contract to Rank for a period of time and starred in a number of films released by the studio, including London Town (1946), one of the costliest flops in British film history. Also under contract to Rank was the Canadian actor Philip Gilbert.

== Growth ==
The company grew quickly, largely through acquisition. Significant developments included:

- 1938 – Odeon Cinemas was purchased.
- 1939 – Denham Film Studios were merged with the facilities at Pinewood, and the Amalgamated Studios in Borehamwood were acquired, but not used for making films.
- 1939 – UK sites of Paramount Cinemas purchased.
- 1941 – Purchase of the Gaumont-British Picture Corporation, which also owned Gainsborough Pictures, 251 cinemas and the Lime Grove Studios.
- 1943 – Acquires Cinema Ground Rents and Properties (later Odeon Associated Theatres).
- In the mid-1940s, Two Cities Films became part of the Rank Organisation producing key films such as Odd Man Out (1947), Hamlet (1948), Vice Versa (1948) and The Rocking Horse Winner (1949).
- 1946 – Bought for £1 million+ a 50 per cent share in a chain of 133 cinemas from New Zealander Robert James Kerridge, the biggest exhibition chain in Australasia; it was renamed Kerridge Odeon.
- 1947 – Acquires General Cinema Finance Corporation, including General Film Distributors (later Rank Film Distributors), including the UK distribution rights to Universal Pictures.
- Late 1940s – A majority shareholding in Allied Cinemas and Irish Cinemas Ltd was gained, becoming the largest exhibition circuit in Ireland (a position maintained until the early 1980s).

By the late 1940s, J. Arthur Rank (or the Rank Organisation as it was now called), owned:

- Five major film studio complexes, Pinewood Film Studios, Denham Film Studios, Ealing Studios, Lime Grove Studios and Islington Studios (the studios at Lime Grove were sold to the BBC in 1949, as were Ealing Studios in 1955).
- 650 UK cinemas (the Gaumont, Odeon and Paramount chains) plus various international holdings, including subsidiaries in Canada and the Netherlands, as well as interests in the Kerridge New Zealand chain and Greater Union Theatres in Australia.
- Eagle-Lion Films.
- Rank Screen Advertising.
- Rank Film Laboratories, Denham (later rebranded DeLuxe London after Rank's acquisition of DeLuxe Laboratories from 20th Century Fox in 1990).
- Manufacturing companies G.B.-Kalee, Taylor Hobson, and Bush Radio.
- Winter Garden Theatre, London.

== Crisis and diversification ==
Despite funding films which were both popular and critically acclaimed, Rank was in crisis by 1949, having built up a debt of £16 million, and reported an annual loss of £3.5 million. Managing director John Davis cut staff, reduced budgets, and concentrated film production at Pinewood. Other studio facilities (in Islington) were closed, sold (Lime Grove Studios) or leased (Denham). The Rank Organisation closed Independent Producers. The policies of Davis alienated many in the industry; in particular, they led film director David Lean, responsible for some of Rank's most critically and financially successful films, to look elsewhere for backing. J. Arthur Rank stepped down as managing director of the Rank Organisation in 1952, but remained as chairman until 1962.

In February 1952, Earl St John of Rank announced the company (in conjunction with the National Film Finance Corporation) would make a slate of 12 movies at a cost of £1,500,000. In August 1952, St John declared Rank would make more films abroad.

In January 1955, Rank announced it would make 12 films at a cost of £1,750,000, with new stars including Peter Finch, Jean Carson, and Diane Cilento.

In October 1955 the company reported its film production was "satisfactory".

== Diversification ==
In 1945, the company bought the Bush Radio manufacturing facility and began to diversify its interests. In 1962, Rank took over control of Murphy Radio to form the Rank Bush Murphy Group (which was eventually sold to Great Universal Stores in 1978).

In 1956, Rank began a partnership with the Haloid Corporation to form Rank Xerox, to manufacture and promote its range of plain paper photocopying equipment. In later years, the waning film company assets were hastily converted and pressed into 'Rank Xerox' service. This venture was a gamble but ultimately the company's saving grace until, once more in financial difficulties, it signed off increasing percentages of its holdings to the parent company, finally becoming fully integrated into Xerox in the late 1990s.

In 1962, Rank merged with Gaumont British to form a single streamlined trading Organisation with nineteen divisions:

- Film production, mainly at Pinewood Studios (1935-2001)and Denham Film Studios (1939-2006)
- World film distribution - UK
- World film distribution - overseas
- Film processing, including Top Rank Laboratories
- Advertising films, production and theatrical distribution of shorts, public information films, and advertising spots for British cinemas.
- Theatre, embracing catering, ballroom dancing
- Tenpin bowling
- Top Rank Health Clubs, two clubs in London
- Filmusic, music publishing company, founded in 1962.
- The Company of Youth, acting school for young contract players for the Rank Organisation.
- Thompson, Diamond & Butcher, wholesaler of records, record players and domestic electrical equipment.
- Wharfedale Wireless Works, high-end audio equipment, acquired by Rank in 1958.
- Top Rank Home & Leisure Service, retail outlets, selling and renting radio and television sets.
- Bush Radio
- Rank Cintel, makers of industrial and research electronic equipment, cathode-ray tubes, photoelectric cells, and semi-conductor devices; studio television equipment and electronic equipment for aircraft and guided missiles
- Rank Xerox founded in 1956 as a joint venture between Xerox and the Rank Organisation
- Rank Taylor Hobson, makers of optical systems and lenses, engineers' measuring instruments and machine tools
- Cine & Photographic, including the Rank Film Library. Manufacturing and marketing the Bell & Howell range of cine cameras and projectors
- Rank Kalee, manufacturing cinema projection, sound, and automation equipment.
- Kershaw and Sons, founded in Leeds in 1888, acquired by Rank in 1947
- Top Rank Motor Inns, Motor Lodge.
- Top Rank Motorway Service, Motorway service area.
- The Rank Group a gambling company.
  - Rank was also a significant shareholder (37.6%) in the consortium which became Southern Television, the first ITV television contract holder for the south of England.
  - In 1968, they acquired an 18% interest in manufacturer George Kent Ltd. In 1969, control of Ranx Xerox was lost and by 1970, the company and its subsidiaries had the following principal activities:
- Leisure, including film exhibition, dancing, bingo, motorports and restaurants
- Films
- Manufacturing - production of scientific instruments, electronic equipment, radio and television
- Audio visual - manufacture of high fidelity audio equipment, educational products and theatre lighting equipment and distribution of audio visual aids, cameras, cine equipment and theatre furnishing
- Hotels, including the Royal Lancaster Hotel

=== Rank Records ===
In the late 1950s, The Rank Organisation set up Rank Records The record label division was named Top Rank Records and Jaro Records (a US subsidiary).

In 1960, Top Rank Records was taken over by EMI, and in 1962 they replaced it with Stateside Records. Top Rank artists included Gary US Bonds, the Shirelles, B. Bumble and the Stingers, Wilbert Harrison, Skip & Flip, Andy Stewart, Craig Douglas and John Leyton. A US branch operated from 1959 to 1961; its artists included Jack Scott, Dorothy Collins, and The Fireballs.

=== Leisure ===
Top Rank was also used for their theatres, ballrooms and bowling alleys. By 1962, they were operating 360 theatres in the UK, 535 theatres overseas, 25 Top Rank Ballrooms, eight tenpin bowling centres, 21 Victor Silvester dance studios and two health clubs. They also operated Top Rank Home and Leisure Service shops, selling and renting household electrical goods. By 1963 Rank had opened Top Rank Coin-Operated Laundries. By 1967, they were operating 50 full-time Top Rank Clubs for bingo; 24 bowling centres in the United Kingdom; 17 hotels in the UK and Europe; 22 suites and ballrooms; eight Top Rank 'Rendezvous' clubs for dancing; and two indoor ice rinks.

In 1968, Rank withdrew from the television rental business selling 102 stores to Granada plc for £4.1 million and 26 stores and its television and radio relay business to Rediffusion for £3.5 million. It retained 37 retail radio and television shops. By 1970, the group abandoned its interests in tenpin bowling, selling all its bowls, due to lack of popularity in the UK.

=== Rank Audio Visual ===
Rank Audio Visual was created in 1960, bringing together Rank's acquisitions in multimedia, including Bell & Howell (acquired with Gaumont British in 1941), Andrew Smith Harkness Ltd (1952) and Wharfedale Ltd (1958). In 1964 they acquired The Pullin Group which made Rank the UK's largest distributor of photographic equipment. Subsequent acquisitions included Strand Electric Holdings (1968) and H.J. Leak & Co. (1969). In the mid and late 1970s, Rank Audio Visual made a 3-in-1 stereo music centre, as well as TV sets in conjunction with NEC of Japan. The production of the "classic" Rank TV ran in the mid to late 70s, and a "modern" Rank TV appeared in the early 1980s. The NEC badge did not appear in the PAL/220/240 volt countries until the mid-1980s.

=== Motoring ===
Top Rank was one of the early operators of motorway service areas in the UK, opening its first services at Farthing Corner on the M2 in Kent in May 1963. Knutsford Services on the M6 in Cheshire followed in November 1963. After the opening of the Aust services on the M4 in Gloucestershire in 1966, they were operating four in the UK. Top Rank operated a portfolio of 10 service areas until the takeover of Mecca Leisure Group by the Rank Group in 1991, when they were spun off to ex-Mecca CEO Michael Guthrie under the name Pavilion (later acquired by Granada and now forming part of Moto Hospitality). They also operated a number of Motor Inns in Ireland and the UK, starting with one outside Dublin.

== Declining involvement in the film industry ==
During this period, Rank started focusing on primarily solidly commercial ventures, largely aimed at the family market. These included the popular Norman Wisdom comedies, the Doctor films series and, later, Rank took on the Carry On film series from Anglo-Amalgamated. Films of note produced during this era include Carve Her Name with Pride, Sapphire, A Night to Remember and Victim, as well as a clutch of prestige topics such as the Coronation of Elizabeth II and filmed performances by the Royal Ballet.

In February 1956, Davis announced Rank would make 20 films at over £3 million. He said "great care will be taken to ensure that, while retaining essentially British characteristics the films will have the widest international appeal. This is part of an intensified drive to secure ever widening showing in overseas markets which already return more than half the revenue earned by Pinewood films." That year, Rank announced it would set up distribution in the United States. In October, Davis listed the Rank actors he thought could become international stars: Dirk Bogarde, Peter Finch, Kay Kendall, Jeannie Carson, Virginia McKenna, Belinda Lee, Michael Craig, Tony Wright, Maureen Swanson and Kenneth More.

In October 1957, at the 21st birthday celebrations for Pinewood Studios, Davis said Rank would make 18 films that year and 20 the next, with the latter costing £5 million.

In January 1958 Rank announced it would be stopping four films and sacking over 300 workers in an economy measure due to an overall fall in cinema attendances. (Four films it were making at the time were A Night to Remember, Nor the Moon by Night, The Wind Cannot Read and Innocent Sinners which cost £1.1 million in total.)

In September 1958 the company had lost £1,264,000 on films causing the group's profit to drop from £5 million to £1.8 million. John Davis wound up several long term contracts Rank had with talent. "The trouble with some of them is they won't work," he said. "They lose their sense of proportion." To recoup some of their losses, Rank sold Ealing Studios and its library to Associated British Picture Corporation.

In the late 1950s, Sydney Box became head of production; he retired from the industry in 1959.

In January 1960, John Davis announced that Rank would concentrate on bigger budgeted, internationally focused productions.

In 1961, they announced a production slate of a dozen films worth £7 million.

In October 1962, Lord Rank resigned as chairman of the company and was replaced by managing director Davis. That year, the company made a group profit of over £6 million and stated 41% of its film production income came from overseas.

In October 1964, Davis reported profits of £4.6 million.

From 1959 to 1969, the company made over 500 weekly short cinema films in a series entitled Look At Life, each film depicting an area of British life.

By 1970, the organisation ceased direct distribution of films overseas.

From 1971 to 1976, Rank only invested around £1.5 million a year in film production. According to executive Tony Williams, "the two main streams that they were down to was Carry On pictures and horror films made by Kevin Francis". However, in 1976, Rank enjoyed much success with Bugsy Malone (which they co-produced with Paramount Pictures, who held its American rights). This encouraged them to re-enter film production.

== Temporary revival and last years ==
In 1977, Rank appointed Tony Williams head of production and over two years Rank made eight films worth £10 million, including Eagle's Wing, The Shout, The Thirty Nine Steps, Riddle of the Sands and Silver Dream Racer. (Another account said the company committed £4 million a year over three years.) Many of these stories were set in the past. "You have to go back in time to tell a story that doesn't have to face seventies problems", said Williams in 1978. "What people are nostalgic for isn't necessarily any particular period, but the happier values that are missing today." Few of these new Rank films performed well at the box office, losing £1.6 million overall. The Rank cinemas refused to play some of the movies.

At the Cannes Film Festival in 1980, Ed Chilton of Rank announced a £12 million slate of projects. However, by June, they withdrew from production once again. "The decision was made to plunge on in and then it was pulled back", said Williams. The Rank films that had been announced for production – including an adaptation of HMS Ulysses, The Rocking Horse Winner and a film version of To the Manor Born – were cancelled. "It now takes too long to recoup money on films," said a spokesman for Rank.

The following year, Rank reported a record pre-tax profit of £102 million. According to Tony Williams:

After a time Rank Film Distributors was in trouble because they hadn't got any new product. So Rank Film Distributors was then given chunks of money to go and buy into pictures because they made a blunder. And they carried on, on that basis, not directly making them and they had no direct control over what they made at all, no influence. They just bought into pictures. They did an output deal with Orion and that carried on until they sold the shooting match. Then the decision was made to get out of (the) film (industry), so RFD was closed down, Rank Film Advertising was sold off, eventually, the laboratories went. Cinemas was the last one to go.

In 1982, the company partnered with Andre Blay Corporation to license its British title library to home video. In 1986, Rank Film Distributors and archrival Cannon Screen Entertainment signed a deal with the BBC to gain access to Rank's nineteen feature offerings. In 1987, the Rank Film Distributors group received a $100 million fund for film financing, and the Rank Film and Television division had invested in $32 million that they would take the budget against non-US rights.

In 1995, the Rank Group acquired all the outstanding shares of the Rank Organisation. In spring 1997, the Rank Group sold Rank Film Distributors, including its library of 749 films, to Carlton Communications for £65 million and immediately became known as Carlton/RFD. Pinewood Studios and Odeon Cinemas were both sold off in February 2000 for £62 million and £280 million respectively. The company finally severed its remaining connections with the film industry in 2005, when it sold its DVD distribution business and Deluxe technical support unit.

== See also ==
- Cintel
- Mutual Life Insurance Co of New York v Rank Organisation Ltd [1985] BCLC 11
- The Rank Foundation, founded by J. Arthur Rank and his wife
- The Rank Prizes
- Top Rank Suite, a chain of nightclubs owned by Rank
- Group Film Productions

== Bibliography ==
- Geoffrey Macnab, J. Arthur Rank and the British Film Industry, London, Routledge (1993), ISBN 0-415-07272-7.
- Alan Wood, Mr. Rank, London, Hodder & Stoughton (1952).
- Quentin Falk, The Golden Gong: Fifty years of the Rank Organisation, its films and its stars, London, Columbus Books (1987), ISBN 0-86287-340-1
