= Lancaster (Forton) Services =

Motorway service station in Lancashire, England

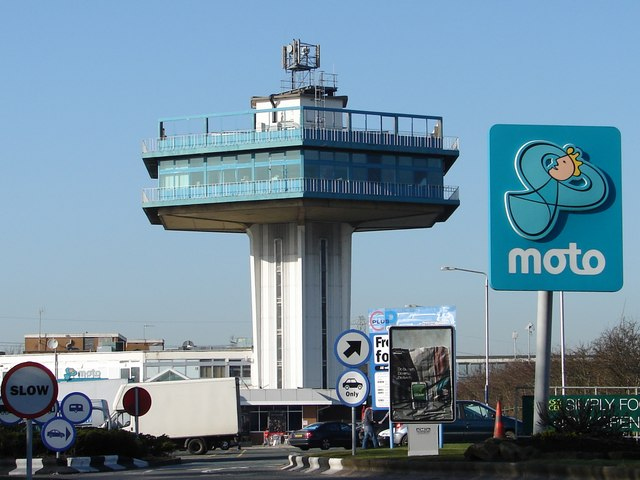
- The Pennine Tower

- Location in Lancashire, England Location in Wyre Borough, Lancashire Location on the UK motorway network

Information
- County: Lancashire
- Road: M6
- Coordinates: 53.9608°N 2.7596°W
- Operator: Moto Hospitality
- Previous operator: Top Rank
- Previous name: Forton Services
- Date opened: 29 January 1965 (petrol only); 14 July 1965 (full)
- Website: moto-way.com/services/lancaster-northbound

Lancaster (Forton) services is a motorway service station, between junctions 32 and 33 of the M6 motorway in England. The nearest city is Lancaster, about 7 miles (11 km) to the north. The site is operated by Moto.

Like many older service stations, it has an all-weather enclosed bridge which enables pedestrians to use both the northbound and southbound facilities. In 2005 this bridge had work carried out to strengthen it to withstand the impact of a heavy goods vehicle.

== History ==
=== Construction ===
Forton Services was built on the Preston-Lancaster section of the M6. Junction 33 (A6) is to the north and junction 32 (M55) is to the south. The site's eastern edge is the boundary between Wyre district and City of Lancaster district.

The architect was T.P. Bennett and Son. The company's first design for service areas was Strensham services; Forton was its second.

It was originally operated by Top Rank Motor Inns. In September 1964, company chairman John Davis announced that all Rank Organisation motorway service areas would have showers and toilets for lorry drivers, starting with Forton. The company felt that lorry drivers were often overlooked, and that lorry drivers previously had a 'smoke and a sandwich in a lay-by'. Farthing Corner on the M2 was the first Top Rank motorport to open, followed by Knutsford Services.

The section of the motorway was finished three months ahead of schedule and opened on the afternoon of 29 January 1965. The catering facilities at Forton services were not due to be completed before April 1965, however, the two petrol stations were able to open at the same time as the motorway, with the name Forton services. It was the second service station to open on the motorway (Charnock Richard being the first), and is named after the nearby village of Forton.

It fully opened on Wednesday 14 July 1965, with 276 staff, and manager 36-year-old David Beatson, educated at Sale Grammar School.

=== Structure ===
The services is notable for an unusual hexagonal concrete tower on the northbound side, named The Pennine Tower, which originally housed an up-market restaurant and a sun deck. The tower was designed to resemble an air traffic control tower and is a prominent local landmark. The tower is 74 feet (23 m) across.

The tower closed to the public in 1989 due to current fire regulations (there is no means of providing an alternative exit from the restaurant deck in an emergency), and is only used for storage and occasional staff training. The tower was built to give views over Morecambe Bay to the west and the Trough of Bowland to the east. In late 2016, Moto refreshed the services and painted the tower in a beige colour whilst also refurbishing one of the passenger lifts.

The tower was listed Grade II on 15 October 2012.

| Next southbound: Charnock Richard | Motorway service stations on the M6 motorway | Next northbound: Burton-in-Kendal |
