= Medway services =

Motorway service area in Kent, England

Medway Services
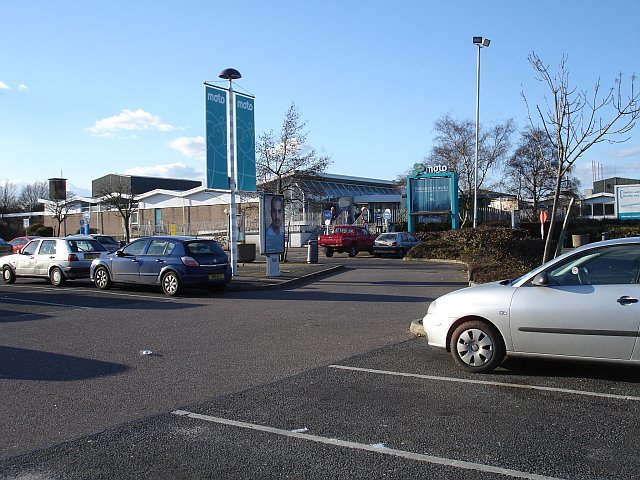
- The services viewed from the westbound car park

- Location within Kent

Information
- County: Kent
- Road: M2
- Coordinates: 51.3406°N 0.6073°E
- Operator: Moto Hospitality
- Previous operator: Top Rank / Granada
- Previous name: Farthing Corner
- Date opened: 29 May 1963
- Website: moto-way.com/services/medway-westbound/

Medway is a service area on the M2 motorway south of Medway, near Junction 4 in Kent, southeast England. It is managed by Moto and was previously named Farthing Corner, which is the name of the nearby settlement.

== History ==
The site was opened by Ernest Marples on Wednesday 29 May 1963, on the day that the first 13 miles of the M2 (Medway Towns Motor Road) opened.

There were 180 staff, and parking for 380 cars and 130 trucks or coaches. Each side had 24 petrol pumps. The first manager was W. L. Denman. It was the first Top Rank service area to open, followed by Knutsford Services later in the year then by Forton Services in 1965; both are on the M6.

=== Construction ===
300,000 tonnes of earth were moved, to put the service area 20 feet above the motorway. The construction of a tunnel under the English Channel had been mooted; this had attracted the Rank Organisation to the site. The site cost around £250,000.

George Wimpey were given the contract on 6 August 1962. Wimpey built 11 miles of the M2.

=== Food ===
- 120-seat Medway Restaurant, on the north side - greengage-coloured seating, teak tables with waitress service, serving smoked salmon; its charcoal grill served lamp chop and Scottish (Angus) rump steak, served with vegetables such as asparagus; it was open from 7am to 10.30pm, but open an hour earlier in July and August for cross-channel travellers; it had foreign language menus, with foreign language (French) newspapers served with French croissants and coffee, with foreign makes of cigarettes too from the Coastal Kiosk, and Dutch chocolates, French nougat and Michelin Guides
- 200-seat self-service cafeteria Thanet Buffet, on the north side - coloured sherry, tan and beige, open from 7am to 10.30pm
- 170-seat cafeteria Channel Buffet coloured blue fig and mustard, on the south side, with the Kentish Kiosk, which was open 24 hours
- Picnic Area, on the south side, with four acres of natural woodland, and tables and chairs built by a Whitstable company, modelled on furniture at Ohio State National Park
- Sun Terrace and Promenade

There was no transport cafe for truck drivers, so truck drivers were expected to eat in the cafeteria, as the south side Channel Buffet was open 24 hours, and it served egg, bacon and chips. Truck drivers typically expected good standards of food.

Both cafeteria buffets were designed to serve up to ten customers a minute. American toasters were installed as they provided toast in 25 seconds, not the typical 50 seconds. Swedish cash registers were installed as these counted the customer's change as well. Infrared display units were installed to keep food hot on the counters. The choice of cake, tea and coffee came from a year of research, with hundreds of cakes and pastries being tested; local water had been taken to tea tasting rooms in London, to find the best blend of tea for the local water in Kent. Costa Rican coffee was chosen. Fruit pies were imported from Canada - blueberry, boysenberry and pecan. Apple pies, obviously, came from nearby Kent orchards; these were largely next door. Most of the salad and vegetables were from Kent, and oysters were from Whitstable. The cafes sold Cantrell & Cochrane soft drinks (C&C Group). Catering equipment was provided by Gardiner & Gulland of Hither Green in London, owned by Smith & Wellstood.

== Geography ==
To the north-east is Hartlip, in the Borough of Swale.

== Layout ==
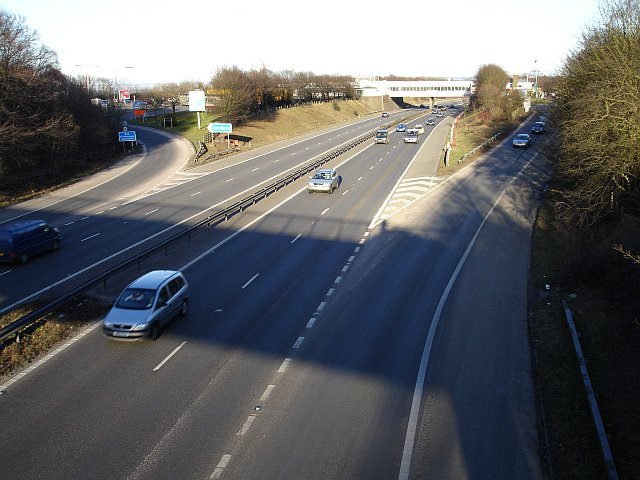
Looking east at the bridge-restaurant over the motorway.

The services are available from both directions, connected by an overbridge over the motorway itself.

There is a Travelodge hotel at the services which is also accessible from local roads.

Two coaches of Liverpool fans stopped off, from Germany, in March 1978: nine Liverpool fans would be arrested.
