= Sandbach services =

Motorway service station in Cheshire, England

Sandbach Services
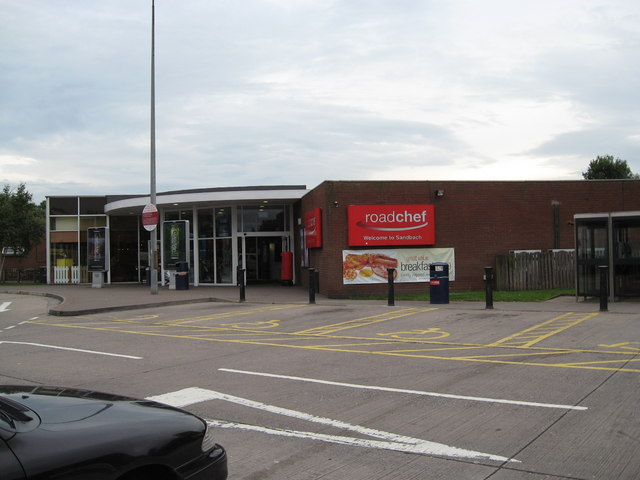
- The southbound services building

- Location in Cheshire, England Location on the UK motorway network

Information
- County: Cheshire
- Road: M6
- Coordinates: 53.1399°N 2.3367°W
- Operator: Roadchef
- Date opened: 1976
- Website: www.roadchef.com/locations/sandbach

Sandbach services is a motorway service station on the M6 near Sandbach, Cheshire, England.

== History ==
The site was built by Linked Group Construction, with a contract in August 1975 for £906,000. The same Cheshire construction company would be given the £750,000 contract for Taunton Deane services, but the company collapsed before Taunton Deane was built.

The northbound side opened for fuel on 15 December 1975, with the southbound side opening before Christmas 1975. Both sides in 1975 had fuel and limited catering. Full catering would open in the summer of 1976. The site was opened for fuel at an earlier date, as the services at Knutsford and Keele were highly congested at peak times (and still are, notably the petrol at Knutsford).

The services originally fully opened in July 1976 and have always been operated by Roadchef.

In 2004, Swiss catering inspectors, working on behalf of the AA and Continental motoring organisations, found that Sandbach Services were the worst of the 61 service stations they had visited. In August 2011, it was rated as three stars by quality assessors at Visit England.

The arrests of two men in connection with the failed Glasgow bombing were conducted in the vicinity of Sandbach Services in 2007.

== Location ==
The services are located between junctions 16 and 17 of the M6 on both sides of the carriageway. The nearest town is Sandbach.

Next southbound: Keele	Motorway service stations on the M6 motorway	Next northbound: Knutsford
