= Bromford Viaduct =

Elevated section of motorway in Birmingham, England

Coordinates: 52.506°N 1.829°W

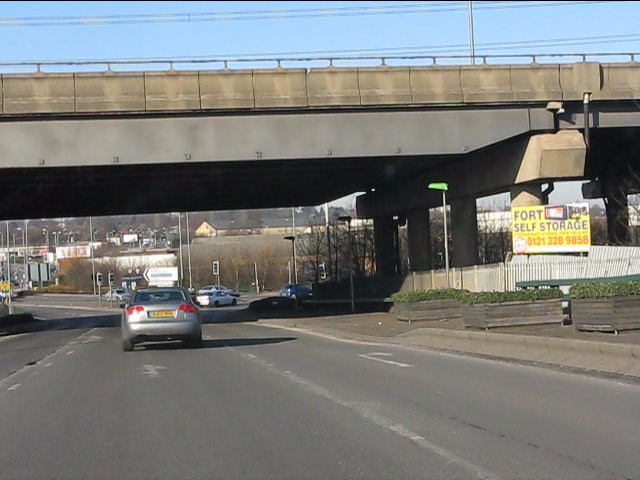
Bromford Viaduct crosses Bromford Lane, part of the A4040, Birmingham's non-motorway outer ring road.

Location in West Midlands
Location in UK motorway network

The Bromford Viaduct carries the M6 motorway between Castle Bromwich (junction 5) and Gravelly Hill (junction 6; Gravelly Hill Interchange) along the River Tame valley in Birmingham, England. This elevated stretch of motorway above the Tame itself is 3 1/2 miles (5.5 kilometres) long, which makes it the longest viaduct in Great Britain, 1/4 mile (400 metres) longer than the Second Severn Crossing. It was constructed between 1964 and 1972.

Between 2012 and 2014, the motorway along the length of the viaduct was converted to a smart motorway system, with variable speed limits.
