= Stafford services =

Pair of motorway service stations in Staffordshire, England

Stafford Services
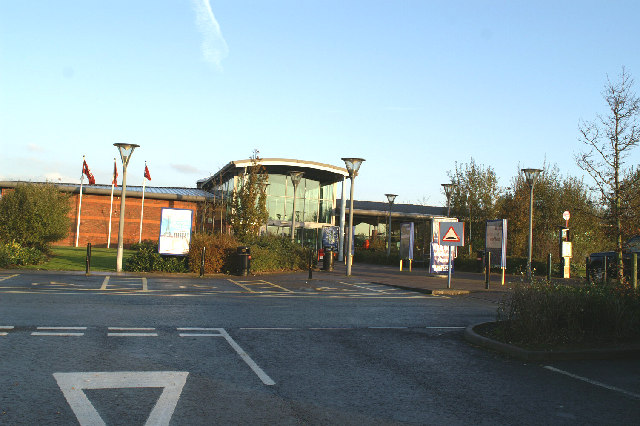
- Stafford South building.

- Location in Staffordshire, England Location on the UK motorway network

Information
- County: Staffordshire
- Road: M6
- Coordinates: 52.8844°N 2.1708°W

Northbound services
- Operator: Moto
- Date opened: 1996
- Fuel: BP
- Website: moto-way.com/services/stafford-northbound

Southbound services
- Operator: RoadChef
- Date opened: 1999
- Fuel: Esso
- Website: www.roadchef.com/locations/stafford-south

Stafford services is a pair of motorway service stations on the M6 motorway near Stone, Staffordshire, England.

It is unusual, in that the facilities on the northbound (opened 1996) and southbound (1999) sides of the motorway are operated by separate companies: Moto (formerly Granada) and Roadchef respectively. They are 1 mile (1.6 km) apart. In August 2011 the northbound site was rated as 4 stars, and the southbound site 3 stars, by quality assessors at Visit England.

== History ==
Prior to the construction of the station, a geophysical survey was undertaken to examine cropmarks which possibly marked the location of a ring ditch to ensure that an archaeological site was not destroyed. The ditch was not found, although medieval and post-medieval artefacts were recovered.

Blue Boar constructed the southbound services, in addition to their services at Watford Gap but shortly before completion in 1999 they were acquired by Roadchef, who now operate the site.

The 2019 Motorway Services User Survey found that Stafford's northbound side was in the top five motorway services in the UK for customer satisfaction.

== Location ==
The services are located in Staffordshire on the M6 motorway between junctions 14 and 15, and are accessed directly from the motorway. Stoke on Trent is located about 10 miles (16 km) to the north, Manchester about 60 miles (97 km) to the north, and Stafford is about 8 miles (13 km) to the south.

Next southbound: Hilton Park; Norton Canes (M6 Toll)	Motorway service stations on the M6 motorway	Next northbound: Keele
