= Simon Verity =

British sculptor and master stonecarver (1945–2024)

- Born: 1 July 1945; Amersham, Buckinghamshire, England
- Died: 11 August 2024 (aged 79); Llandeilo, Carmarthenshire, Wales
- Education: Marlborough College
- Occupations: Sculptor; stonecarver; letter cutter
- Spouses: Judith Mills (m. 1970, divorced); Martha Finney (m. 2013)
- Children: 3
- Father: Terence Verity

Simon Verity (1 July 1945 – 11 August 2024) was a British sculptor, master stonecarver and letter cutter. Much of his work is garden sculpture and figure sculpture in cathedrals and major churches. His works are in the private collections of King Charles III, Sir Elton John and Lord Rothschild.

== Background ==
Verity was born in Amersham in 1945, the son of Terence Verity, an architect and art designer, and his wife Enid, née Hill, artist, designer and colour theorist. Following his education at Marlborough College, he received his training through an informal apprenticeship to his great-uncle, Oliver Hill, at Daneway House, and under the conservationist Professor Robert Baker's teaching at Wells Cathedral.

== Career ==
Verity's early work includes inscriptions and small printed editions of concrete poetry in collaboration with Sylvester Houédard, produced in his studio at Daneway. Having established his own studio at Rodbourne, St Paul Malmesbury Without, he made notable contributions of figure sculpture and fountains to local Cotswold gardens, including Barnsley House, Kiftsgate Court and Batsford Arboretum.

A 1988 memorial by Verity for the writer Sophie Behrens was the catalyst for the creation of Memorials by Artists, an organization dedicated to the creation of unique memorials.

From the mid-1980s, Verity worked with a small team of colleagues, including Diana Reynell, Belinda Eade and his own family, on the restoration of a group of historic grottoes, including those at Marlborough Mound (1982–86), Painshill Park (1987–89), Goldney House (1984), Hampton Court House (1986–89) and Walton Hall Bath House (1987–91). He subsequently created new grottoes at Leeds Castle (1989), and in the United States, England, Greece and Italy.

Verity acquired from the Nicholson family of gin distillers the Hartham Park or Pickwick underground quarry of Bath stone, at Box Hill, near Corsham, originally opened in the 1840s, which he sold in 1989.

Settling in the United States about 1988, Verity worked as director on the carving of the west portal of the Cathedral of Saint John the Divine, New York (also known as the Portal of Paradise) from 1988 until 1997. At the start, Verity was assisted by six apprentices. In 1993, Jean-Claude Marchionni, a master stonecarver from France, joined Verity in the project. A procession of 32 matriarchs and patriarchs from the Old and New Testaments were carved from blocks of limestone already in place.

In 2004, Verity was commissioned to design and build a hand-carved map of the United Kingdom to form the paving for the British Memorial Garden in New York's Hanover Square. The Garden commemorates the 67 British victims of the 11 September 2001, attack on the World Trade Center. The map features all the counties of Great Britain, as well as the boroughs of London and British Islands and protectorates. The map is carved from grey flagstone from Caithness and sandstone from Moray, Scotland.

Verity participated in a programme of artist's residencies, lectures and demonstrations in the United States. In January 2015, he visited Duke University for a 10-day residency during which he recreated the Head of a virtue, a 1245 sculpture from Notre-Dame Cathedral that is now in the collection of the Nasher Museum of Art at Duke.

Verity's writings include memoirs of his apprenticeship with Oliver Hill and The Library of Libraries (2013), a satirical illustrated polemic inspired by the campaign to preserve the stacks in the main branch of the New York Public Library.

== Personal life and death ==
In 1970, Verity married Judith Mills; they had three children and later divorced. In 2013, he married Martha Becker Finney.

Verity died from Lewy body dementia at his home in Llandeilo, Carmarthenshire, Wales, on 11 August 2024, at the age of 79.

== Works ==
Other works include:

- Portland stone carved baptismal font at Clifton Cathedral, Bristol (1973)
- Figures in niches on the tower of St Mary's Church, Purton, Wiltshire (1973)
- A demi-angel with lute (south side) and (in the gable apex) a nude figure of St Peter with net and keys, both on the image screen at Exeter Cathedral (commissioned 1984)
- A seated king in niche 199 of the West Front at Wells Cathedral (1980/81)
- A seated nude and mother and child at Kiftsgate Court, Gloucestershire
- A fountain, lady in a hunting habit and other works at Barnsley House, Gloucestershire
- A grotto at Leeds Castle, Kent
- Lettering for the entrance to the Henry Cole Wing of the Victoria and Albert Museum, London (1983)
- A plaque in The V&A Temple at The Laskett, Herefordshire, for Sir Roy Strong (1988) and a medallion to celebrate Sir Roy’s retirement after 14 years as Director of the V&A Museum (1987).
- Tombstones and memorials for many distinguished personages, including Sir John Betjeman; Lady Diana Cooper; Edmund Blunden; Nancy Mitford; Henry Somerset, 10th Duke of Beaufort; Lynne Redgrave; Rachel Kempson; Harry Stuart Goodhart-Rendel; Allan Gwynne-Jones; Anne Parsons, Countess of Rosse, and her husband Michael Parsons, 6th Earl of Rosse; Sir Algar Henry Stafford Howard; Linetta de Castelvecchio Richardson; James Pope-Hennessy; Frank Russell Barry, Bishop of Southwell; Rosemary Verey; Susana, Lady Walton and George Wein.
- Retrospective memorials to famous historical figures, including a tablet to Bishop Lancelot Andrewes (1994/5) in the chancel of Winchester Cathedral and a floor inscription to mark the former position of the shrine of St Thomas Becket in the Trinity Chapel of Canterbury Cathedral. The Defenders' Memorial in the south cloister at Westminster Abbey was unveiled by the Duke of Edinburgh on 25 March 1982.
- Four life-size classical figure statues of the seasons for the roof pediments at Henbury Hall, Cheshire (about 1986)
- Figure of Spring, terms and inscription at Llowes Court, Glasbury, Powys
- Figure of Aphrodite at Woodside, Old Windsor, Berkshire
- La Bocca fountain, bas reliefs, statue of Aphrodite and garden features at La Mortella, Ischia
- A grotto at Woody House in East Hampton, New York
- Grotto at estate in Fort Worth, Texas (1989)
- Grotto at Agnitsini, Corfu
- The Guardian, sculpture in memory of Princess Catherine Galitzine Campbell (died 1988) in the Chicago Botanic Garden (1992)
- Fountains, sundial and inscriptions at the American Academy in Rome (1996)
- Orpheus fountain in memory of Jane Blaffer Owen (died 2010) at The Cathedral Labyrinth (a replica of the Chartres Cathedral labyrinth), New Harmony, Indiana
- The Gorgeous Mosaic, a panel at Bellevue Hospital, NYC (1991)
- Labrum fountain, Leon Levy and Shelby White Court, Metropolitan Museum of Art, New York (opened 2007)
- A three-dimensional bronze interpretation of the Castello Plan map of Dutch New Amsterdam, located in Peter Minuit Plaza near the southern tip of Manhattan island, 2010.
- Three replacement figure sculptures after the drawings of Ninian Comper for The Leslie Lindsey Memorial Chapel, Emmanuel Episcopal Church, Boston, USA (installed 2017)
