= Thelwall Viaduct =

Bridge in United Kingdom

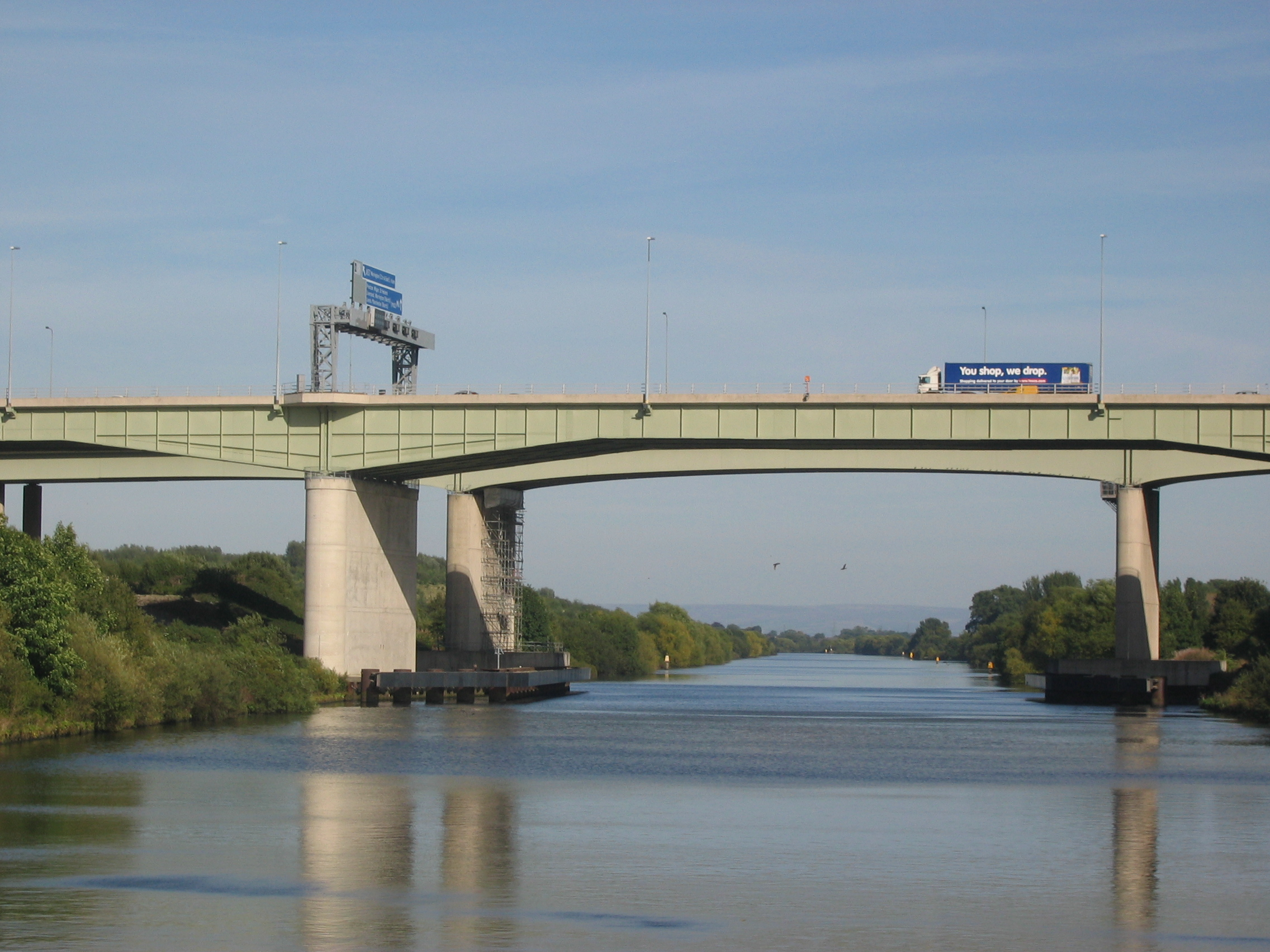
- Main span of the two bridges over the Manchester Ship Canal, with the older bridge in the foreground
- Coordinates: 53.3906°N 2.5059°W
- Carries: M6
- Crosses: Manchester Ship Canal; River Mersey
- Locale: Lymm/Woolston, Cheshire
- Maintained by: National Highways

Characteristics
- Design: Plate girder bridge
- Material: Reinforced concrete, Steel
- Total length: 4,414 ft (1345.4 m) northbound 4,500 ft (1371.6 m) southbound
- Longest span: 336 ft (102.4 m)
- Clearance below: 93 ft (28.3 m)
- No. of lanes: 4 each direction Slip road on the northbound descent

History
- Constructed by: Leonard Fairclough (1963)
- Fabrication by: Dorman Long (1963)
- Opened: First bridge: 29 July 1963; Second bridge: 23 December 1996

Statistics
- Daily traffic: ▲167,565 (2018); Count point

Location
- Interactive map of Thelwall Viaduct

Location in Cheshire
Location in UK motorway network

The Thelwall Viaduct (grid reference SJ664883) is the name given to a pair of steel composite girder viaducts in Lymm, Warrington, England. They carry the M6 motorway across the Manchester Ship Canal and the River Mersey. They are between junctions 20 and 21 of the M6, the former also being junction 9 of the M56.

== Structure ==
It comprises two separate bridges, one of 4,414 feet (1,345 m) long carrying the northbound carriageway, the longest motorway bridge in England when it was opened in July 1963, and one 4,500 feet (1,400 m) long carrying the southbound carriageway, opened in 1995. The longest single span is that of 336 feet (102 m) crossing the Ship Canal.

== History ==
The scheme was announced on Thursday 9 July 1959 by Minister of Transport Harold Watkinson, with the Gathurst Viaduct and Creswell Viaduct, near Stafford, over the River Sow. The bridge would cost £5,056,678, and was to be built by Leonard Fairclough & Son, and designed by Sir James Drake.

=== Construction ===
Work started in September 1959, and was to be finished by March 1962. 10,500 tons of steel superstructure was made by Dorman Long. Concrete was supplied by Four Square Industries of Middlewich. On Thursday 16 May 1963, the last two girders were put into place. The bridge had taken longer to build than expected, and the motorway was due to open on Monday 29 July 1963. The bridge was designed to take up to 79,000 vehicles per day.

In August 1990 it was proposed to build a second viaduct, to start in 1992. The £52.5m contract was awarded to Tarmac Construction of Wolverhampton in October 1992, with consulting engineers Pell Frischmann. Junctions 20 and 21a would be remodelled. Concrete came from Pochin Group of Middlewich.

=== Maintenance ===
In July 2002 a failed roller bearing was discovered and it became necessary to close all but one northbound lane. As the M6 at the time carried an estimated 150,000–160,000 vehicles per day, this led to serious congestion. The viaduct was not completely reopened to daytime traffic until February 2005, and subsequently remained partially closed at night for further remedial work to take place. In all, 148 bearings were replaced, the repair scheme costing around £52 million.

The bridge's height and openness to the elements mean that it has frequently been the subject of speed reductions because of strong gusts of wind that badly affect the stability of high-sided vehicles. On several occasions lane closures have resulted as a consequence of articulated vehicles simply being blown over. However, the open sides of the bridge are a deliberate design feature to reduce the likelihood of snow drifts building on the carriageways.

== Events ==
=== 1971 multiple vehicle collision ===
At approximately 8am on 13 September 1971 thick fog led to a catastrophic multiple vehicle crash on the viaduct. More than 200 cars, trucks and tankers piled up, five vehicles burst into flames, 10 people were killed and 70 injured. It was the worst crash ever recorded on British roads at that time.

=== 2011 rave ===
In April 2011 a massive free party took place under the viaduct, with reportedly over 5,000 ravers in attendance.

=== 2024 crash ===
On 30 September 2024, a lorry fell from the viaduct and landed on the embankment below. The driver survived.
