= Gathurst Viaduct =

Bridge in Greater Manchester, United Kingdom

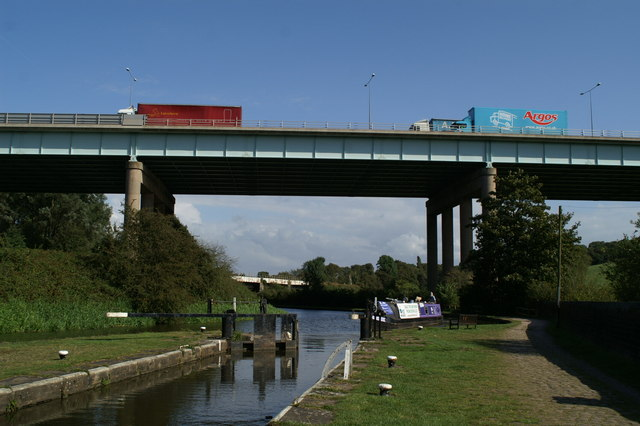
- Coordinates: 53.5617°N 2.7009°W
- Carries: 6 lanes of motor traffic (M6 motorway)
- Crosses: Douglas Valley
- Locale: Gathurst, Shevington, Wigan, Greater Manchester

Characteristics
- Total length: 245m (800 ft)
- Height: 22.8m (75 ft)

History
- Construction cost: c. £830,000
- Opened: December 1961

Statistics
- Daily traffic: ▲106,441 (2018); Count point

Location
- Interactive map of Gathurst Viaduct

Gathurst Viaduct carries the M6 motorway across the Douglas valley at Shevington, Wigan, Greater Manchester, England.

The second largest bridge on the M6 motorway, it lies between junctions 26 and 27. Constructed in 6 spans, it crosses the Leeds-Liverpool Canal, the Manchester to Southport railway line and the River Douglas itself.

The viaduct is 800 ft (240 m) long and 87 ft (27 m) above the level of the river. The reinforced concrete piers consist of five sets of four 6 ft (1.8 m) diameter columns supporting a cill beam. The reinforced concrete deck is carried on ten 10 ft (3.0 m) deep continuous welded plate girders extending over the full length of the bridge. In design terms it is a sister bridge of the Rakewood Viaduct on the M62 motorway near Littleborough. It was built primarily out of wrought iron.

It was built in 1961 by A. Monk and Co Ltd of Irlam at a cost of some £830,000. Steelwork was manufactured by Robert Watson Steelwork Ltd of Bolton.
