= Keele services =

Motorway service station in Staffordshire, England

Keele Services
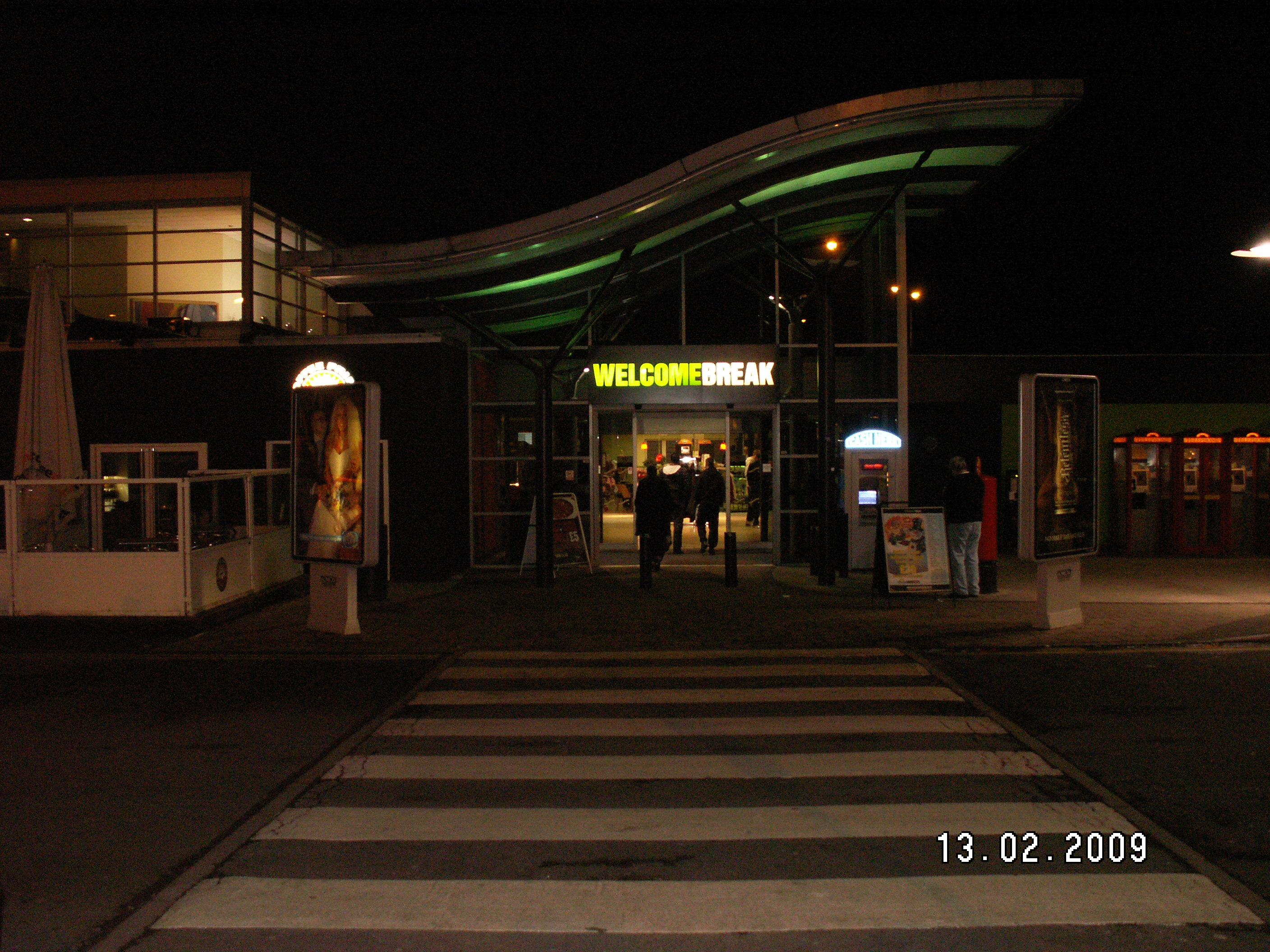
- The main building.

- Location in Staffordshire, England Location on the UK motorway network

Information
- County: Staffordshire
- Road: M6
- Coordinates: 52.9939°N 2.2905°W
- Operator: Welcome Break
- Date opened: 15 November 1963
- Website: welcomebreak.co.uk/locations/keele/

Keele services is a motorway service station, between junctions 15 and 16 of the M6 motorway near Keele in Staffordshire, England. Operated by Welcome Break, it was built in 1963 and was designed by Terence Verity of Verity Associates.

Both sides of the site have Welcome Break petrol stations, W H Smith and Starbucks. There are KFC and Burger King restaurants on the bridge over the motorway.

== History ==
Keele was an exact copy of Charnock Richard; The motorway section was expected to be built by autumn 1962. In February 1961, there was planned to be a transport cafe on both sides, with a cafeteria on at least one side, to be 14 acres (5.7 ha). Keele was to be the first services on the section; Knutsford opened the same day. 17,000 vehicles a day were expected on the motorway section, with 9,000 private cars, and 8,000 trucks and coaches.

The £500,000 contract was given to Laing, who started construction in April 1962. The site was 16 acres (6.5 ha).

The restaurant bridge was forty feet wide, with waitress service, seating 300. On either side there were self-service transport cafes which each seated 72. Each side had a snack bar with waitress service, each seating 100. Each side had room for 240 cars and 70 trucks.

In early May 1974, Keele banned Liverpool, Manchester United, and Everton football fans.

On 27 August 1984, a fire ripped through the service station bridge at Keele, between its two bases, but there were no injuries. There was a plan for a hotel to be built here but this never happened.

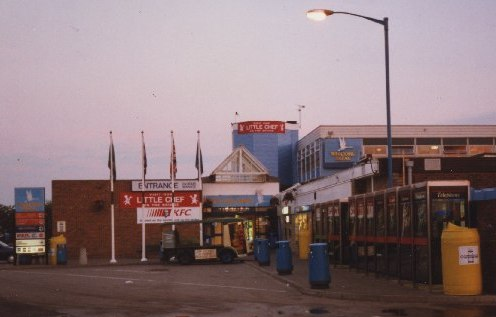
Keele services in 1996

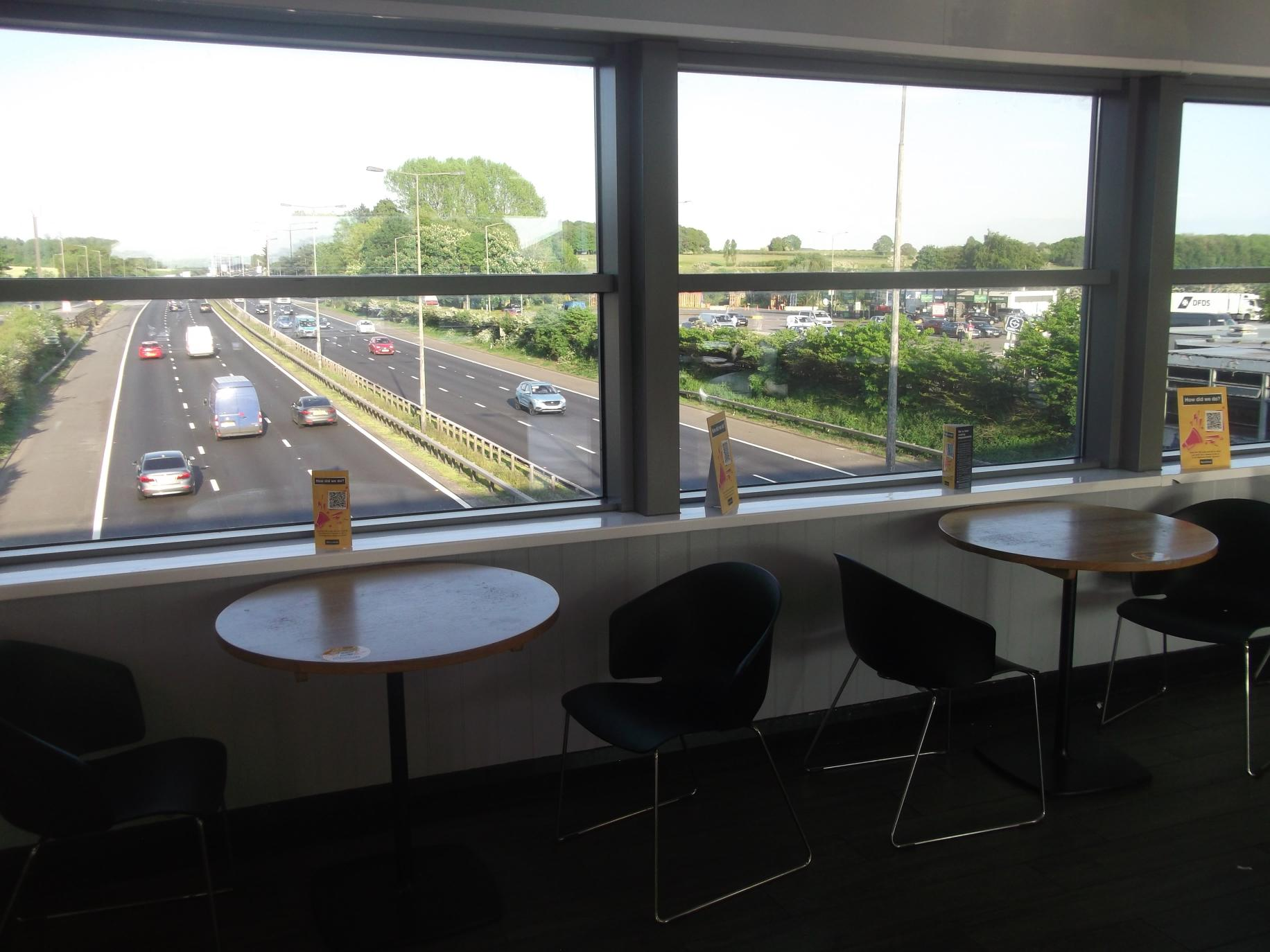
Bridge Restaurant

Next southbound: Stafford	Motorway service stations on the M6 motorway	Next northbound: Sandbach
