= Shireshead =

Hamlet in Lancashire, England

Coordinates: 53.954°N 2.761°W

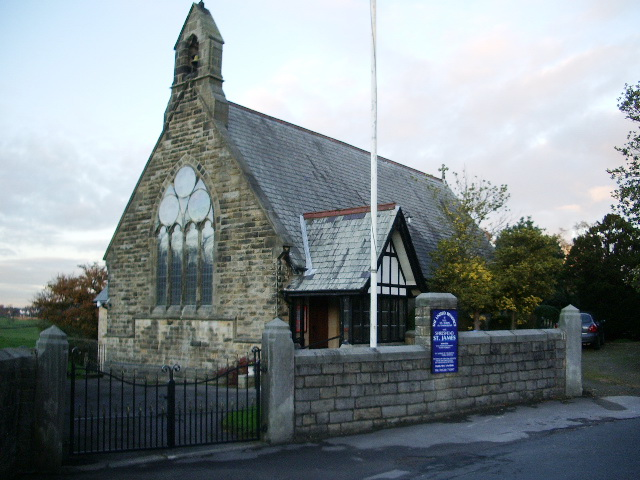
- St James' Church, Shireshead, 1887–90

- Shown within Wyre Borough Location within Lancashire
- OS grid reference: SD501511
- Civil parish: Forton
- District: Wyre
- Shire county: Lancashire
- Region: North West
- Country: England
- Sovereign state: United Kingdom
- Post town: PRESTON
- Postcode district: PR3
- Dialling code: 01524
- Police: Lancashire
- Fire: Lancashire
- Ambulance: North West
- UK Parliament: Lancaster and Fleetwood

Shireshead is a hamlet near Forton, Lancashire. It includes an Anglican church, St James', which was designed by the Leeds-based architectural firm Kelly & Birchall and built in 1887–90.
