= Knutsford Services =

Motorway service station in Cheshire, England

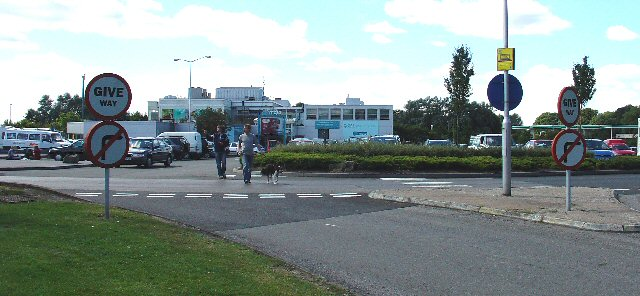
- The southbound main building.

- Location in Cheshire, England Location on the UK motorway network

Information
- County: Cheshire
- Road: M6
- Coordinates: 53.3001°N 2.4021°W
- Operator: Moto Hospitality
- Date opened: 15 November 1963
- Website: moto-way.com/services/knutsford-northbound/

Knutsford Services is a motorway service station on the M6 in Cheshire, England.

== History ==
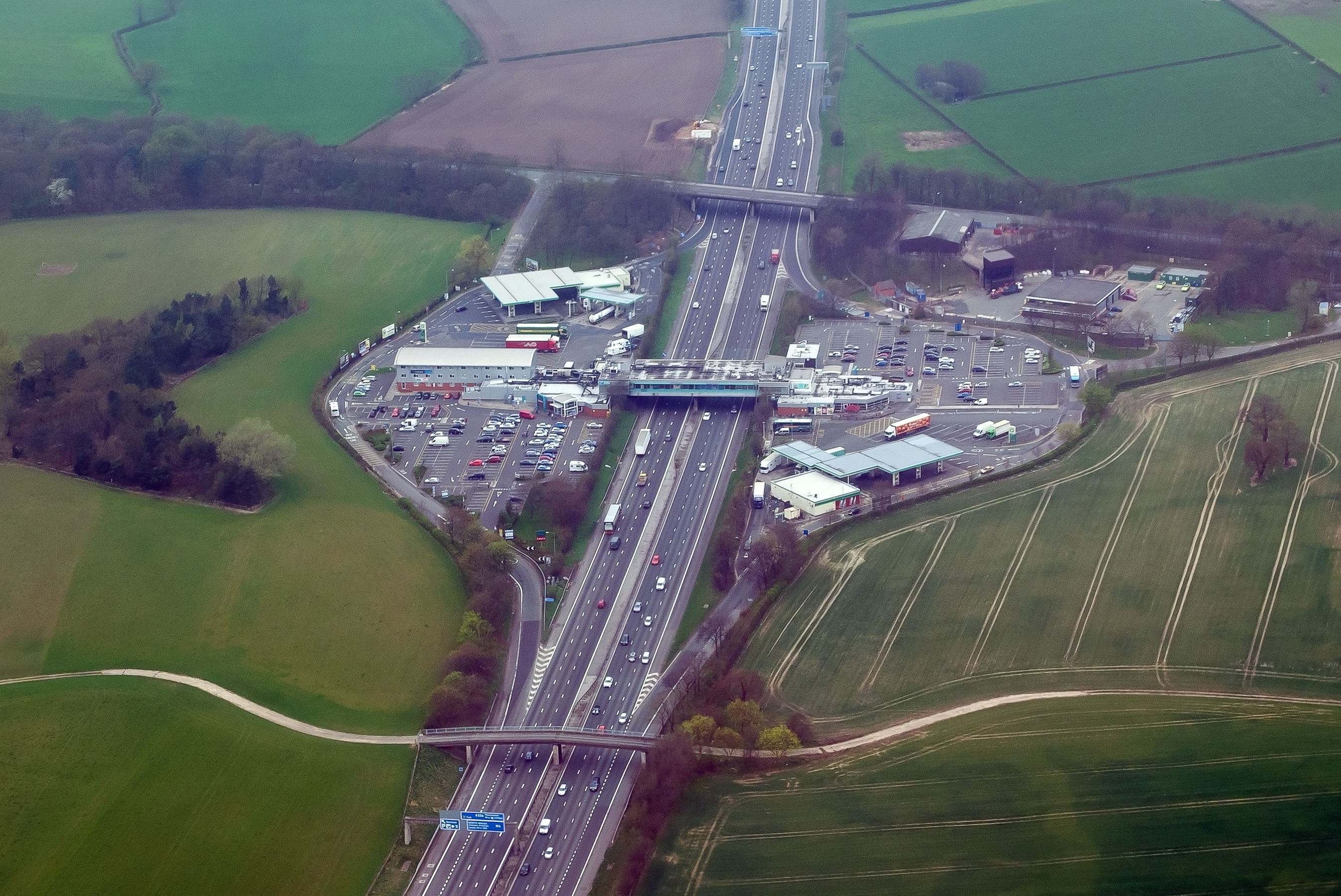
Aerial photograph of Knutsford Services

The headquarters of Tarmac for the 15-mile (24 km) North Cheshire M6 section was at Over Tabley. Work on the Cheshire motorway section started on 28 June 1961, officially by Sir Wesley Emberton, from junctions 18 to 20.

=== Construction ===
The contract was awarded to Top Rank on 28 September 1961, for 12 acres, with 48 petrol pumps. It was the second service area awarded to Rank. There would be two 75-seat transport cafes on either side for truckers; one would be open 24 hours, the other from 7:00 am to midnight. The main catering would be on the bridge, with a 90-seat restaurant, and a 96-seat cafeteria. Truckers' meals would cost 4 shillings; the truckers' menu was formed in consultation with the TGWU. There would be parking for 96 trucks and 300 cars. Work on the restaurant began on 29 September 1962, to open in August 1963.

Food options at the time included:

- Cheshire Grill, waitress service, from 7.30 am to 10.30 pm, with five types of steak, croissant and brioche at breakfast
- Bridge Buffet, same hours
- Knutsford cafe, 24-hour

=== Opening ===
The M6 section opened on 15 November 1963 from Hanchurch to Lymm. The motorway section was officially opened at 12:00 noon from the Knutsford restaurant, with the Bishop of Chester Gerald Ellison and Sir Wesley Emberton; the motorway opened to drivers at 4:00 pm. The bishop prayed "that drivers would exercise courtesy and consideration for others, and that without fear or suffering they might come safely to their journey's end". Also at the Knutsford opening was the "lorry driver of the year", Joe Dakin. The first manager was Sidney Ash. The site could provide meals for 373 people at once.

Knutsford was one of the country's first motorway service stations. As with many services of the time, there are two sites located on either side of the carriageway, linked by a bridge which features a restaurant and shop. Coaches of north-west football fans would call in on their journey to London, and on the way back, occasionally requiring extra police.

The services are now owned by Moto.

The service station has a very short exit slip road, close to the A556 exit slip road on the northbound side of the M6. Slow moving vehicles are often forced to pull into the main carriageway at slow speeds. The station played a pivotal role in comedian Rhod Gilbert's special Rhod Gilbert and the Award-Winning Mince Pie.

The Cheshire Police Motorway Unit has one of its bases here, situated on the southbound side.

=== Incidents ===
In 1965 £2,000 worth of cutlery and crockery was stolen.

Cheshire Police made many arrests at the service area for organised crime, and became adept at identifying stolen cars by the early 1970s. It had trained its officers how to identify stolen cars at its training centre in Crewe.

Seventeen year old Aston Villa fan James Townsend, of Cotton Grove in Longbridge, was jailed for six months at Knutsford court, by Sir Lincoln Hallinan, after stabbing another person with a flick-knife on 16 February 1974. Bricks and bottles had been thrown at another coach.

In May 1974, Liverpool football fans were banned from the service area. In the same week, Keele banned Liverpool, Manchester United, and Everton football supporters. On 12 March 1977, 25 year old Robert Smith was stabbed five times, after an argument with a group of Manchester City supporters. On 3 October 1981, 200 Wolves fans caused £300 of damage when they rampaged.

In June 2019, four bikers were stabbed at Knutsford Services, which led to the M6 northbound being closed off for some time between junctions 18 and 19.

=== Possible redevelopment ===
In 1991 and 1992 there was a proposal to demolish the services, as it is a small 7-acre site, and to build another much-larger 40-acre service area at Cann Lane, mostly on the eastern edge of Aston by Budworth in Arley, Cheshire, and the near the western edges of High Legh and Mere, Cheshire. The original service area would be demolished for part of a new junction and a £55m six-mile spur road, the A556(M). The A556(M) was announced on Monday October 30 1989, developed by consulting engineers Allott and Lomax.

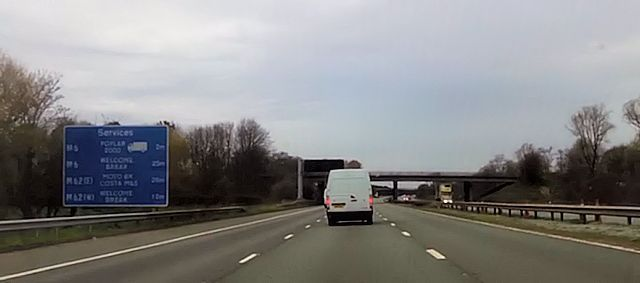
Cann Lane bridge in April 2015

On October 27 1992 an extension of this route, to the M62 at Great Woolden Wood, near Holcroft Moss, was announced by project manager Robert Bine, at Lancashire Cricket Club. It would form the first part of the Greater Manchester Western and Northern Relief Road, from Knutsford to the M66 at Whitefield

The 'Campaign Against Cann Lane Service Area' was formed, which became the Cann Lane Association. Macclesfield Borough Council did not want the proposal.

== Location ==
The service area is in Tabley Superior, near Knutsford, about 1-mile (1.6 km) south of junction 19 of the M6.

| Next southbound: Sandbach | Motorway service stations on the M6 motorway | Next northbound: Lymm (Truckstop); Charnock Richard (full services) |
