= M6 motorway =

Longest motorway in England

M6

- M6 highlighted in blue Shown with UK motorway network

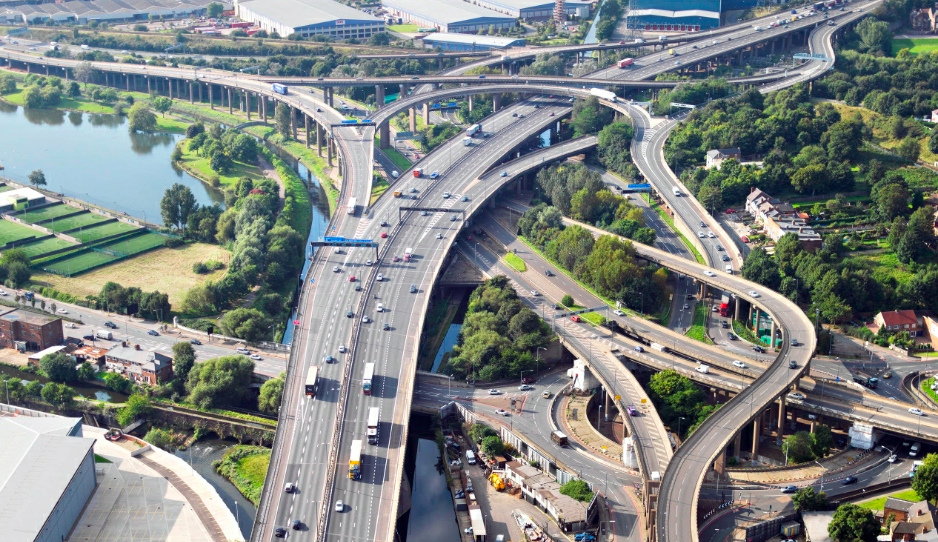
- Gravelly Hill Interchange, best known as Spaghetti Junction in Birmingham, 2008

Route information
- Part of E05, E18, E22 and E24
- Maintained by National Highways
- Length: 232.2 mi (373.7 km)
- Existed: 1958–present
- History: Opened: 1958; Completed: 2008

Major junctions
- Southeast end: Catthorpe; 52.4004°N 1.1752°W
- M1 motorway; J2 → M69 motorway; J3a → M6 Toll; J4 → M42 motorway; J4a → M42 motorway; J6 → A38(M) motorway; J8 → M5 motorway; J10a → M54 motorway; J11a → M6 Toll; J20 → M56 motorway; J21a → M62 motorway; J26 → M58 motorway; J29 → M65 motorway; J30 → M61 motorway; J32 → M55 motorway; J45 → A74(M) motorway
- Northwest end: Gretna; 54.9930°N 3.0482°W

Location
- Country: United Kingdom
- Counties: Leicestershire; Warwickshire; West Midlands; Staffordshire; Cheshire; Merseyside; Greater Manchester; Lancashire; Cumbria
- Primary destinations: Rugby; Coventry; Birmingham; Walsall; Wolverhampton; Cannock; Stafford; Stoke-on-Trent; Newcastle-under-Lyme; Crewe; Warrington; Wigan; Preston; Lancaster; Kendal; Penrith; Carlisle

Road network
- Roads in the United Kingdom; Motorways; A and B road zones

The M6 motorway is the longest motorway in the United Kingdom. It is located entirely within England, running for just over 230 miles (370 km) from the Midlands to the border with Scotland. It begins at Junction 19 of the M1 and the western end of the A14 at the Catthorpe Interchange, near Rugby before heading north-west. It passes Coventry, Birmingham, Wolverhampton, Stoke-on-Trent, Preston, Lancaster and Carlisle and runs between Manchester and Liverpool before terminating at Junction 45 near Gretna. Here, just short of the Scottish border it becomes the A74(M) which continues to Glasgow as the M74. Its busiest sections are between junctions 4 and 10a in the West Midlands, and junctions 16 to 19 in Cheshire; these sections have now been converted to smart motorways.

It incorporated the Preston By-pass, the first length of motorway opened in the UK and forms part of a motorway "Backbone of Britain", running north–south between London and Glasgow via the industrial North of England. It is also part of the east–west route between the Midlands and the east-coast ports. The section from the M1 to the M6 Toll split near Birmingham forms part of the unsigned E-road E 24 and the section from the M6 Toll and the M42 forms part of E 05.

== Route ==
The M6 motorway runs from junction 19 of the M1 and the A14 in Catthorpe near Rugby in central England. It passes Coventry, Birmingham, Stafford, Wolverhampton and Stoke-on-Trent. The motorway has major junctions with the M56 and M62 near Warrington, giving access to Chester, Manchester and Liverpool. It also meets the M65 at Junction 29, south of Preston, which connects Blackburn and Burnley, and the M55 at junction 32, north of Preston which links it to Blackpool. The M6 then heads north past Wigan, Preston and Lancaster. After the latter two cities it passes through Cumbria with some parts very close to the edge of the Lake District with a short stretch within the national park boundaries and then passes Carlisle on its way to Gretna, before the motorway becomes the A74(M) a few hundred metres short of the Scottish border.

== History ==
=== Planning and construction ===
The first section of the motorway and the first motorway in the country was the Preston By-pass. It was built by Tarmac Construction and opened by the Prime Minister Harold Macmillan on 5 December 1958. In January 1959 the Preston by-pass was closed because of rapid surface deterioration over a stretch of 100 yards (91 m) "due to water freezing and then thawing". Motorists were diverted to the old road while the UK road research laboratory at Harmondsworth pondered the importance of surface water drainage.

The second phase of construction was completed in 1960, forming the Lancaster by-pass. Some 100 miles (160 km) south, the Stafford by-pass was completed in 1962. By 1965, the remaining sections of motorway Stafford–Preston and Preston–Lancaster had been completed. 1966 saw junction 11 to 13 completed. 1968 saw the completion of the Walsall to Stafford link as well as the Penrith by-pass some 150 miles (240 km) north in Cumberland. In 1970, the Lancaster–Penrith link was completed, along with a short section of motorway by-passing the south of Walsall. The most northerly section of the motorway also opened in 1970, running to the designated terminus north of Carlisle. By 1971 the full route was completed between the junction with the M1 motorway at Rugby and the A38 road several miles north-east of Birmingham city centre, including Bromford Viaduct between Castle Bromwich (J5) and Gravelly Hill (J6), which at 3.5 miles (5.6 km) is the longest viaduct in Great Britain.

Junction 6 in Birmingham, which opened in May 1972, is widely known as Spaghetti Junction because of its complexity and round and curvy-like design. On the elevated ground between Shap and Tebay, the north and south-bound carriages split apart. At this point a local road (to Scout Green) runs between the two carriageways without a link to the motorway.

The section of the M6 that runs over Shap Fell in Cumbria at Shap Summit is 1,036 ft (316 m) above sea level, one of the highest points on any motorway in the UK (Junction 22 of the M62 on Moss Moor is higher). The motorway engineers here chose to follow the route of the Lancaster and Carlisle Railway engineered by Joseph Locke (now part of the West Coast Main Line) where the motorway runs in a split-level cutting above the railway in the descent from Shap Fell through the Lune Gorge into southern Cumbria.

The section from Lancaster, at Over Kellet, to Penrith was published early April 1964, reaching 1,040 ft over Hardendale Fell, being 44 miles long; over 2.5 miles of the carriageways would be widely separated, up to 800ft. This section was fixed on April 22 1965, with the northern half being 21 miles between Killington Reservoir and Hackthorpe, to the south of Penrith. A section of 5.5 miles near Gatebeck had to be altered, due to objections, south of this section. The 5.5 mile section at Preston Patrick, part of a 15 mile section, had the draft route published on May 31 1965, and was moved further east, on higher ground.

The northbound entry slip road at Lancaster (Junction 34) was unusually short, presenting problems for traffic joining the motorway. The M6 crosses the River Lune at this point and unless the bridge had been made wider, there was no space to build a longer slip road. This junction was upgraded from an earlier emergency-vehicles-only access point, which explains the substandard design. The construction of the Heysham to M6 Link Road (The Bay Gateway) has completely re-modelled this junction with a wide additional bridge over the River Lune and other works repositioning slip roads with new acceleration lanes to modern standards.

The route was originally intended to replace the old A6, which it does along the northern section starting with the Preston Bypass. However, a much closer approximation to the overall actual route of the M6 (heading north from its southern terminus) is provided by following the A45, A34, A50, A49, then the A6. South of Preston, the A6 route is instead supplemented by the M61 as far as Manchester, with the M60 acting as a bypass around the city. South of Manchester, there is no true motorway replacement for the old road. The M1 acts as a bypass for long-distance traffic in the south, from the Kegworth junction near Nottingham, to Luton and St. Albans near London; but, it is not an alternative for local traffic as the routes diverge by more than 15 miles (24 km) while passing through Northamptonshire. Across the Pennines, the old road remains the main local through-route, and long-distance fast traffic between Derby and Manchester must instead take either the A50 and M6, or M1 and M62.

Once all sections of the motorway were constructed, and it was finally all linked together, the result was an uninterrupted motorway length of 230 miles (370 km).

=== Operational ===
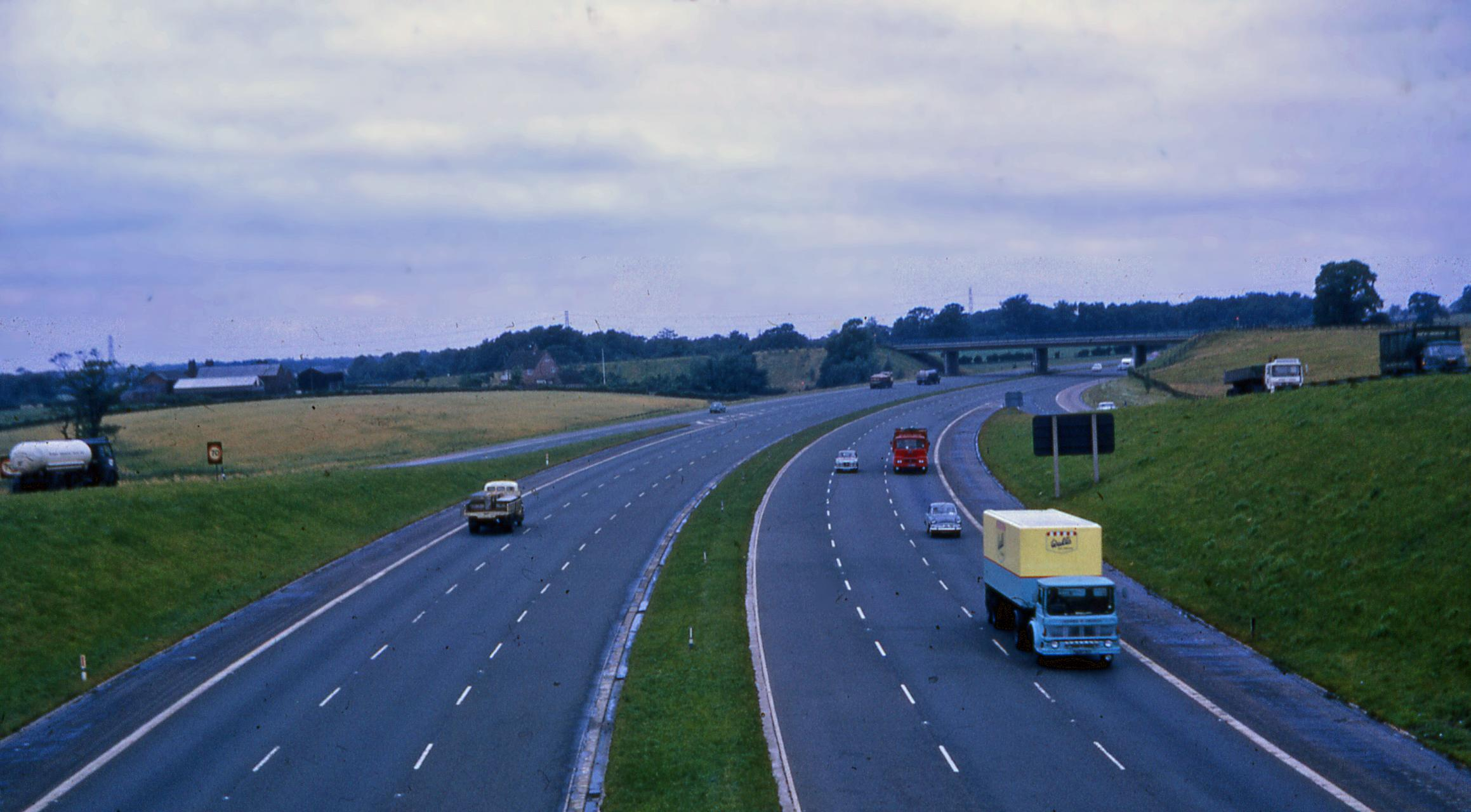
The M6 in Cheshire (1969)

In July 1972, the Minister for Transport Industries, John Peyton, announced that 86 miles (138 km) of UK motorway particularly prone to fog would benefit from lighting in a project which "should be" completed by 1973. Sections to be illuminated included the M6 between junctions 10 and 11, and between junctions 20 and 27.

In March 2006, after 15 years of debate, the government authorised the construction of a 6-mile (9.7 km) extension of the M6 from its then northern terminus near Carlisle to the Anglo-Scottish border at Gretna (the so-called "Cumberland Gap"), where it links into the existing A74(M). The road opened on 5 December 2008, the 50th anniversary of the M6 Preston By-pass. The project, which was a mixture of new road and upgrade of the existing A74, crosses the West Coast Main Line and had an estimated costs of £174 million. It completed an uninterrupted motorway from just south of Dunblane (via the M9, the recently opened M80 section near Cumbernauld and the M73) in the north to Exeter (via the M5) and to London (via both the M42/M40 and the M1) in the south.

M6 service areas
Operators: Moto Roadchef Welcome Break Westmorland

The M6 Toll, Britain's first toll motorway, which bypasses the West Midlands conurbation to the east and north of Birmingham and Walsall and was built to alleviate traffic congestion through the West Midlands, opened in December 2003. Before the opening of the toll motorway, this section of the M6 carried 180,000 vehicles per day at its busiest point near Wolverhampton (between the junctions with the M54 and M5 motorways), compared with a design capacity of only 72,000 vehicles. Usage, at about 50,000 vehicles, was lower than expected and traffic levels on the M6 were only slightly reduced as a result. The high toll prices, which were set by the operating company and over which the UK Government has no influence until 2054, were blamed for the low usage. Much traffic continues to use the M6 or the continued on the M1 and took the A50 or A52. As of July 2012 the road between Junctions 3A and 11A now carries 120,000 motor vehicles every day.

A proposed extension to the M6 Toll known as the 'M6 Expressway', which would have continued from the M6 Toll as far as Knutsford, at which point much of the existing M6 traffic leaves the M6 for Manchester, was abandoned in 2006 due to excessive costs, anticipated construction problems and disappointing levels of use of the M6 Toll.

In October 2007, following a successful trial on the M42 in the West Midlands, the government announced that two stretches of the M6 would be upgraded to allow the hard shoulder to be used as a normal running lane during busy conditions under a scheme called active traffic management. The two stretches, between junctions 4 and 5 and between junctions 10a and 8, are two of the busiest sections on the entire motorway. It was then proposed that the system could be extended onto other stretches of the M6 while the government undertook a feasibility study to determine other likely locations for this technology to be used. The stretch between junctions 4 and 5 was completed during December 2009 while the stretch between junctions 10a and 8 was completed during March 2011. This was then followed by a stretch between junctions 5 and 8 which started construction in April 2012 and was completed in October 2014.

After plans of the government to improve reliability and capacity between Junctions 11 by Cannock and Junction 19 near Knutsford it favoured a new motorway in 2004, 'The Expressway' following a roughly parallel course to the existing M6. In July 2006, the government announced its decision to abandon the Expressway proposal, and favoured widening accompanied by demand-management measures, and launched a study to consider options for providing additional capacity. After the stretch between junction 10a and 13 was upgraded to a managed motorway in February 2016, it was then proposed to introduce a managed motorway between junction 13 and 19, later divided into two separate stretches, between junctions 16 and 19 and junctions 13 and 15. The stretch between junctions 16 and 19 started construction in December 2015 and was completed in March 2019 while construction on the stretch between junctions 13 and 15 commenced in March 2018 and was completed in August 2022.

Work started in 2020 to reconstruct the bridges above the motorway at junction 10, due to frequent congestion at peak times, due to be completed in 2024 at a cost of £78,000,000.

In April 2021, the M6 gained the first motorway service station to be built for thirteen years. Located off Junction 1 at Rugby and opened on 30 April 2021, the facility, run by Moto Hospitality, includes the largest electric vehicle charging facility in the UK, run by Ecotricity and Gridserve.

Work started in March 2022 to upgrade the existing dynamic hard shoulder smart motorway to add newer safety features to the motorway, such as a concrete central reservation, new emergency areas and drainage improvements.

Work started in early 2021 to upgrade the M6 from junction J21A to J26 to the all lane running standard of smart motorway, with an estimated cost of between £100–250 million. The smart motorway was originally due to be fully open in 2023, but was only completed in late 2024.

=== Incidents ===
On 13 September 1971 at 7 am, due to fog at Lymm, 11 were killed in an incident on the northbound carriageway which involved 94 vehicles. The motorway was closed for ten hours. Five bodies were so badly burned that recognition was difficult. There were 14 fire engines from Knutsford, Northwich, Altrincham, Stockton Heath, and Warrington.

== Junctions ==
Data from driver location signs are used to provide distance and carriageway identifier information. Where a junction spans several hundred metres (yards) and the start and end distances are known, both distances are shown.

M6 motorway junctions
mile	km	North-westbound exits (A carriageway)	Junctions	South-eastbound exits (B carriageway)	Coordinates
		Motorway continues as A74(M) towards Scotland	J45	Start of motorway	54.9930°N 3.0482°W
313.2	504.3	Gretna B7076, Longtown A6071	J45	No access (on-slip only)	54.9930°N 3.0482°W
		River Esk			54.9748°N 3.0092°W
309.6; 309.2	498.2; 497.5	Todhills Rest Area	Services	Todhills Rest Area	54.9516°N 2.9796°W
307.6; 307.3	495.1; 494.6	Carlisle (North), Galashiels A7	J44	Carlisle A7, Workington A689	54.9301°N 2.9463°W
		River Eden			54.9093°N 2.8953°W
303.8; 303.5	488.9; 488.4	Carlisle, Hexham, Newcastle A69	J43	Carlisle, Hexham, Newcastle A69	54.8953°N 2.8869°W
301.1; 300.7	484.6; 484.0	Carlisle (South) A6	J42	Carlisle A6	54.8576°N 2.8784°W
		Southwaite services	Services	Southwaite services	54.7991°N 2.8711°W
288.7; 288.4	464.6; 464.1	Wigton B5305	J41	Wigton B5305	54.693°N 2.7917°W
285.5; 285.2	459.5; 459.0	Penrith, Workington, Brough A66	J40	Penrith, Keswick, Brough A66	54.6531°N 2.7602°W
274.4; 274.0	441.6; 441.0	Shap (A6)	J39	Shap, Kendal (A6)	54.5083°N 2.6498°W
		Tebay services	Services	Tebay services	54.4513°N 2.6080°W
		River Lune			54.4411°N 2.5950°W
268.9; 268.5	432.7; 432.1	Brough A685, Appleby B6260	J38	Kendal, Brough A685	54.4368°N 2.5969°W
260.3; 260.0	418.9; 418.4	Kendal, Sedbergh A684	J37	Kendal, Sedbergh A684	54.3310°N 2.6229°W
		No access	Services	Killington Lake services	54.3150°N 2.6391°W
252.7; 252.3	406.7; 406.0	Barrow, Kendal A590 (A591), Kirkby Lonsdale A65	J36	Skipton, Kirkby Lonsdale A65, Barrow A590	54.2364°N 2.7165°W
		Burton-in-Kendal services	Services	No access	54.1782°N 2.7339°W
		Entering Cumbria		Entering Lancashire	54.1701°N 2.7370°W
245.1; 244.6	394.4; 393.6	Carnforth, Morecambe A601(M) (A6)	J35	Carnforth, Morecambe A601(M) (A6)	54.1287°N 2.7498°W
240.8; 240.6	387.6; 387.2	Kirkby Lonsdale, Heysham, Morecambe, Heysham A683, Lancaster A589	J34	Lancaster, Morecambe, Heysham A683	54.0716°N 2.7711°W
234.6; 234.3	377.6; 377.1	Lancaster (South) A6	J33	Garstang, Fleetwood A6	53.9825°N 2.7807°W
		Lancaster (Forton) services	Services	Lancaster (Forton) services	53.9621°N 2.7602°W
		River Wyre			53.9539°N 2.7514°W
221.5; 221.0	356.5; 355.7	Blackpool, Fleetwood M55; Preston (N) (A6)	J32	Blackpool, Preston (N) (A6) M55	53.8068°N 2.6978°W
219.5; 219.3	353.2; 352.9	Preston (E), Longridge B6242	J31A	No access (on-slip only)	53.7889°N 2.6583°W
		River Ribble	J31	Preston, Clitheroe A59	53.7649°N 2.6359°W
		Preston (C), Blackburn (N), Clitheroe A59	J31	River Ribble	53.7649°N 2.6359°W
215.4; 214.9	346.6; 345.9	No access (on-slip only)	J30	Manchester, Bolton M61, Leeds (M62), Blackburn (M65)	53.7343°N 2.6477°W
213.9; 213.5	344.3; 343.6	Burnley, Blackburn, Preston (S) M65	J29	Burnley, Blackburn M65	53.7162°N 2.6608°W
212.3; 211.9	341.6; 341.0	Leyland B5256 (A49)	J28	Leyland B5256	53.6959°N 2.6776°W
		Charnock Richard services	Services	Charnock Richard services	53.6315°N 2.6908°W
204.8	329.6	Entering Lancashire	J27	Wigan, Parbold A5209	53.5897°N 2.6944°W
204.4	329.0	Parbold, Standish, Chorley A5209	J27	Entering Greater Manchester	53.5897°N 2.6944°W
		Gathurst Viaduct			53.5617°N 2.7009°W
200.8; 200.5	323.1; 322.6	Skelmersdale, Liverpool, Southport M58	J26	Skelmersdale, Liverpool, Southport M58	53.5341°N 2.6980°W
198.0; 197.8	318.7; 318.3	Wigan, Ashton A49	J25	No exit (on-slip only)	53.5018°N 2.6597°W
196.9; 196.5	316.9; 316.3	No exit (on-slip only)	J24	St Helens, Ashton (no entry - exit only) A58	53.4867°N 2.6529°W
		Entering Greater Manchester		Entering Merseyside	53.4802°N 2.6440°W
195.6; 195.2	314.8; 314.1	St Helens, Liverpool, Southport A580	J23	Manchester, Liverpool, Newton A580	53.4713°N 2.6336°W
192.4	309.6	Entering Merseyside	J22	Warrington (North) A49	53.4401°N 2.5841°W
192.1	309.1	Newton A49, Leigh A579	J22	Entering Cheshire	53.4401°N 2.5841°W
191.0; 190.5	307.4; 306.5	Leeds, Bolton, Manchester (N) M62	J21A	Manchester, Bolton, Leeds M62	53.4259°N 2.5559°W
191.0; 190.5	307.4; 306.5	Liverpool, Warrington (N), Southport (M57) M62	J21A	Liverpool M62	53.4259°N 2.5559°W
188.3; 188.0	303.0; 302.5	Warrington (Ctr & East), Irlam A57	J21	Warrington (Central), Irlam A57	53.3978°N 2.5099°W
		Thelwall Viaduct			53.3898°N 2.5058°W
185.6	298.7	North Wales, Chester, Runcorn M56; Warrington (South), Lymm A50; Lymm Truck Stop	J20; Services	Macclesfield, Warrington (S) A50, Lymm B5158; Lymm Truck Stop	53.3604°N 2.5091°W
185.3; 184.5	298.2; 296.9	North Wales, Chester, Runcorn M56; Warrington (South), Lymm A50; Lymm Truck Stop	J20; Services	North Wales, Chester, Runcorn, Manchester (S &) M56	53.3585°N 2.5080°W
		End of variable speed limit	J19	Start of variable speed limit	53.3116°N 2.4176°W
180.3; 179.9	290.2; 289.5	Manchester, Manchester (M56) A556	J19	Northwich, Macclesfield, Knutsford A556	53.3116°N 2.4176°W
		Knutsford services	Services	Knutsford services	53.3008°N 2.4016°W
172.2; 171.9	277.2; 276.7	Chester, Northwich, Middlewich A54	J18	Chester, Northwich, Middlewich A54	53.2004°N 2.3875°W
168.9; 168.3	271.3; 270.8	Congleton, Sandbach A534	J17	Congleton, Sandbach A534	53.1532°N 2.3467°W
		Sandbach services	Services	Sandbach services	53.1390°N 2.3365°W
162.6	261.7	Entering Cheshire	J16	Newcastle-under-Lyme, Stoke-on-Trent (North), Crewe, Nantwich A500	53.0686°N 2.3336°W
		Start of variable speed limit	J16	End of variable speed limit	53.0686°N 2.3336°W
162.3	261.2	Nantwich, Crewe A500	J16	Entering Staffordshire	53.0686°N 2.3336°W
		Keele services	Services	Keele services	52.9936°N 2.2894°W
		End of variable speed limit		Start of variable speed limit	
153.1; 152.9	246.4; 246.1	Stoke-on-Trent, Newcastle-under-Lyme A500	J15	Stoke-on-Trent, Stone A500, Derby (A50)	52.9756°N 2.2263°W
		Stafford services (northbound)	Services	No access	52.8839°N 2.1686°W
		No access	Services	Stafford services (southbound)	52.8739°N 2.1649°W
142.0; 141.8	228.6; 228.2	Stone, Stafford (N) A34	J14	Stafford (N) A34	52.8265°N 2.1456°W
136.8; 136.5	220.1; 219.6	Stafford (S & C) A449	J13	Stafford (S) A449	52.7636°N 2.1079°W
131.6; 131.2	211.8; 211.1	Telford (M54) A5	J12	Wales, Telford (M54), Wolverhampton, Cannock A5	52.6890°N 2.1035°W
		No access (on-slip only)	J11A (TOTSO SB)	The South M6 Toll	52.6695°N 2.0743°W
128.7; 128.4	207.2; 206.7	(M6 Toll), Cannock A460	J11	Wolverhampton, Cannock A460	52.6584°N 2.0644°W
		Hilton Park services	Services	Hilton Park services	52.6434°N 2.0565°W
127.0; 126.7	204.4; 203.9	North & Mid Wales, Telford, Wolverhampton, Shrewsbury (A5) M54	J10A	No access (on-slip only)	52.6302°N 2.0490°W
				Entering West Midlands	52.6187°N 2.0321°W
		Entering Staffordshire			52.6169°N 2.0304°W
123.3; 122.9	198.4; 197.8	Walsall, Wolverhampton (C & E) A454	J10	Wolverhampton (C & E), Walsall A454	52.5849°N 2.0143°W
121.7; 121.5	195.8; 195.6	Wednesbury A461	J9	Wednesbury A461	52.5665°N 2.0032°W
119.9	193.0	The South West, Birmingham (W & S), West Bromwich M5	J8	The South West, Birmingham (W & S), West Bromwich M5	52.5571°N 1.9767°W
118.4; 118.1	190.6; 190.1	Birmingham (N), Walsall A34	J7	Birmingham (N) A34	52.5531°N 1.9340°W
114.2; 113.9	183.8; 183.3	Birmingham (C) A38(M); Birmingham (NE) A38	J6	Birmingham (NE), Lichfield A38; Birmingham (E & C) A38(M)	52.5101°N 1.8638°W
		Bromford Viaduct			52.5060°N 1.8290°W
110.9; 110.8	178.5; 178.3	Birmingham (E), Sutton Coldfield A452	J5	No access (on-slip only)	52.5093°N 1.7891°W
				Entering Warwickshire	52.5130°N 1.7536°W
108.8; 108.6	175.1; 174.8	No access (on-slip only)	J4A	The North East (M1), The North West (M6 Toll), Tamworth M42(N); The South West (M5), London (S & W) (M40), Birmingham (S), Birmingham International, Birmingham, National Exhibition Centre M42(S)	52.5100°N 1.7471°W
		Entering West Midlands			52.4786°N 1.7150°W
106.0	170.6	Start of variable speed limit	J4	Coventry (S & W), Birmingham (E), N.E.C., Birmingham International, Birmingham A446	52.4768°N 1.7072°W
105.7	170.1	Coleshill A446; The South West (M5), Birmingham (S), Solihull, Birmingham International, N.E.C., Birmingham M42	J4	End of variable speed limit	52.4768°N 1.7072°W
		The North West M6 Toll, Tamworth M42(N)	J3A (TOTSO NB)	No access (on-slip only)	52.4739°N 1.6717°W
		Corley services	Services	Corley services	52.4715°N 1.5463°W
96.9; 96.4	155.9; 155.2	Coventry (North), Nuneaton, Bedworth A444	J3	Coventry (N), Nuneaton A444, Bedworth B4113	52.4630°N 1.4938°W
		Entering Warwickshire		Entering West Midlands	52.4580°N 1.4827°W
		Entering West Midlands		Entering Warwickshire	52.4400°N 1.4400°W
93.7; 93.3	150.8; 150.1	Coventry, Warwick A46; Leicester, Hinckley M69	J2	(M1(N)), Leicester M69, Coventry (E) A46	52.4379°N 1.4298°W
85.6; 85.2	137.8; 137.1	Rugby A426; Rugby services	J1; Services	Rugby, Lutterworth A426; Rugby services	52.4081°N 1.2457°W
		Entering Warwickshire		Entering Leicestershire	52.4060°N 1.2096°W
85.2	137.1	Start of motorway	M1 J19	The South, London, Northampton M1(S)	52.4004°N 1.1752°W
		The North, Leicester M1(N)	M1 J19	End of motorway Road continues as A14 towards Kettering	52.4004°N 1.1752°W

Notes

1. 1: Southbound offslip for the M56 signed as J20A.
2. 2: Unsuitable for heavy goods vehicles.

== Legislation ==
Each motorway in England requires that a statutory instrument be published, detailing the route of the road, before it can be built. The dates given on these statutory instruments relate to when the document was published, and not when the road was built. Provided below is an incomplete list of statutory instruments relating to the route of the M6.

- Statutory Instrument 1987 No. 252: County Council of West Midlands (M6 Motorway Junction 10) (Connecting Road) Scheme 1985 Confirmation Instrument 1987
- Statutory Instrument 1987 No. 2254: M6 Motorway (Catthorpe Interchange) Connecting Roads Scheme 1987
- Statutory Instrument 1990 No. 2659: M6 Motorway: Widening between Junctions 20 and 21A (Thelwall Viaduct) and Connecting Roads Scheme 1990
- Statutory Instrument 1991 No. 1873: M6 Motorway (Widening and Improvements Between Junctions 30 and 32) and Connecting Roads Scheme 1991
- Statutory Instrument 1993 No. 1370: Lancashire County Council (Proposed Connecting Roads to M6 Motorway at Haighton) Special Roads Scheme 1992 Confirmation Instrument 1993
- Statutory Instrument 1997 No. 1292: M6 Birmingham to Carlisle Motorway (At Haighton) Connecting Roads Scheme 1997
- Statutory Instrument 1997 No. 1293: M6 Birmingham To Carlisle Motorway (at Haighton) Special Roads Scheme 1997 Transfer Order 1997
- Statutory Instrument 1998 No. 125: The M6 Motorway (Saredon and Packington Diversions) Scheme 1998

== See also ==
- List of motorways in the United Kingdom
- Category:M6 motorway service stations
- Murder of Jacqueline Ansell-Lamb, a woman who was abducted and murdered while hitchhiking up the M6 in 1970
