= Transport in Glasgow =

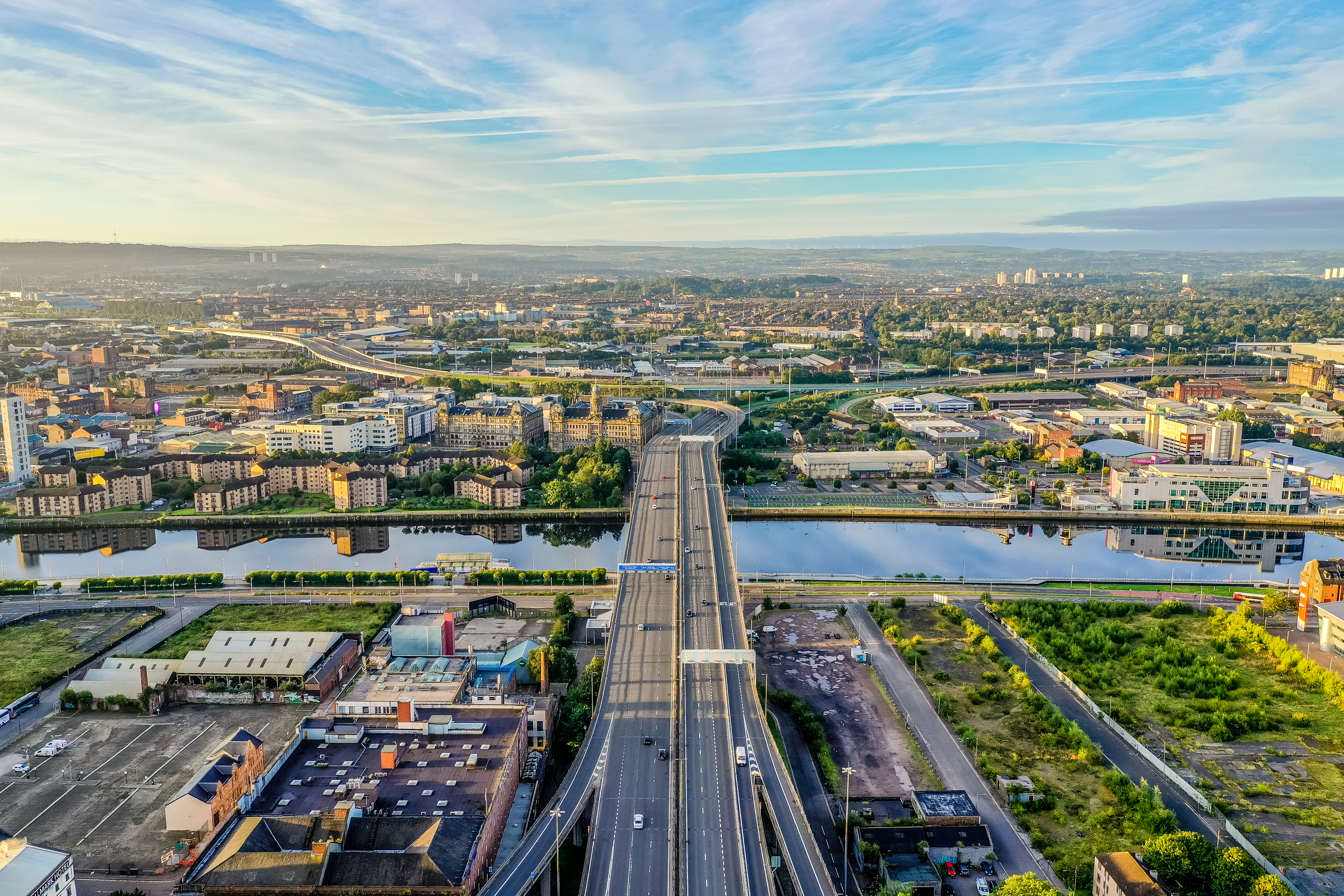
The Kingston Bridge carries the M8 motorway over the River Clyde in Glasgow city centre.

The city of Glasgow, Scotland, has a transport system encompassing air, rail, road and an underground light metro line. Prior to 1962, the city was also served by trams. Commuters travelling into Glasgow from the neighbouring local authorities of North and South Lanarkshire, Renfrewshire, East Renfrewshire, and East and West Dunbartonshire have a major influence on travel patterns, with tens of thousands of residents commuting into the city each day. The most popular mode of transport in the city is the car, used by two-thirds of people for journeys around the city.

Most streets in the centre of Glasgow are organised in a grid-iron pattern laid out in the early 19th century, with streets running north-to-south and east-to-west.

== Transport authorities ==
Glasgow's transport network is administered by a number of authorities. Transport Scotland is responsible for the construction, expansion and maintenance of trunk roads and motorways within the city (such as the M8, M73, M74 and M77 motorways), with the city government, Glasgow City Council responsible for all other roads. Strathclyde Partnership for Transport (SPT) is responsible for strategic transport planning for the region, including coordinating services amongst the various private bus operators, and also operates the Glasgow Subway. The local rail network is operated by ScotRail.

== Airports ==
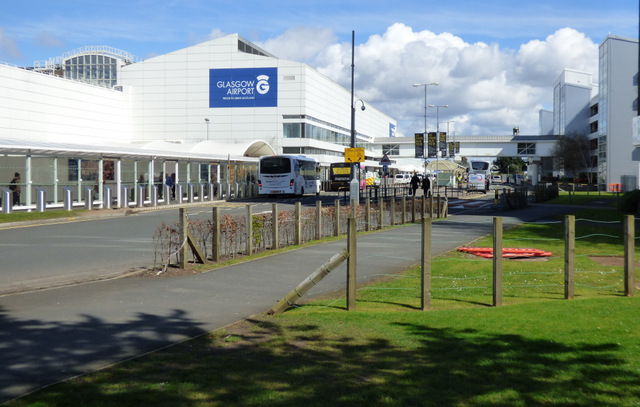
Glasgow International Airport

Glasgow has two international airports and is also served by a seaplane terminal.

Glasgow International Airport (GLA) is the closest airport to the city and handles the majority of Glasgow's air traffic across its two terminals. This includes shuttle flights to and from London and the rest of the UK, continental flights to various cities in Europe and long-haul transatlantic links to cities in the Americas as well as links to the Middle East.

The airport was opened in 1966 and typically handles over 10 million passengers a year, making it the second-busiest airport in Scotland and the ninth-busiest airport in the United Kingdom.

The airport sits to the west of the city in the town of Paisley and is connected to the city via the M8 motorway.

Glasgow Prestwick Airport (PIK) is located 29 miles south west of the city in South Ayrshire and focuses on short-haul leisure flights to Europe, low-cost airlines and freight traffic. Prestwick is Scotland's fifth-busiest airport in terms of passenger numbers, but its largest in terms of land area.

Glasgow also has a Seaplane Terminal located in the city centre on the River Clyde. This offers services to the Scottish islands and the far north.

There are also two small airfields in the nearby towns of Cumbernauld in North Lanarkshire and Strathaven in South Lanarkshire.

== Motorway network ==
Glasgow is a focal point of Scotland's motorway network. The network is heavily used at peak times and is one of the most comprehensive in the United Kingdom, connecting the city centre with the rest of the sprawling Greater Glasgow area.

=== M8 ===
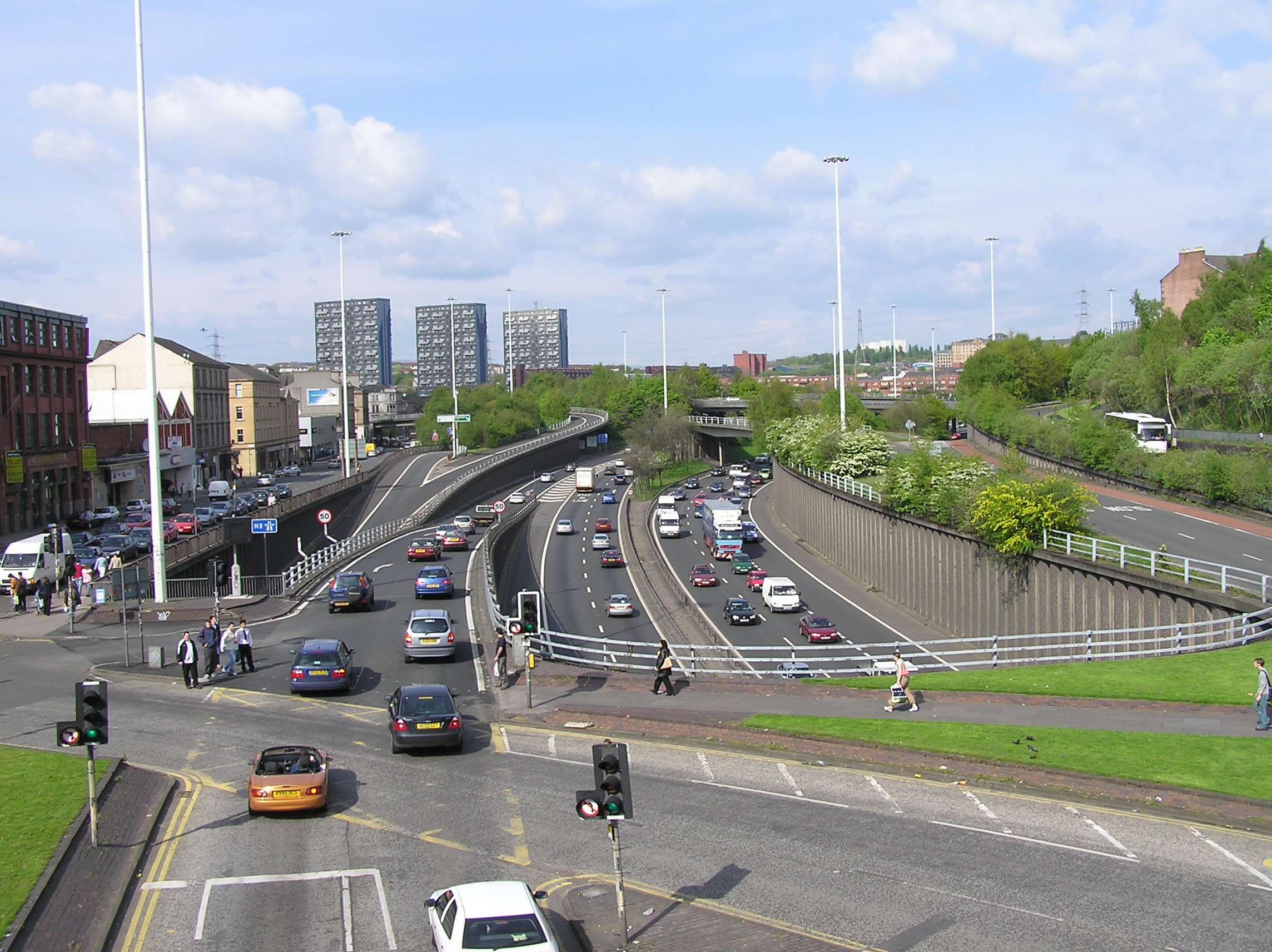
The M8, Scotland's busiest motorway, passing under Charing Cross in central Glasgow.

The M8 is Scotland's busiest motorway, running from the capital city of Edinburgh, approximately 40 miles (64 km) to the east of Glasgow, through the centre of Glasgow and on to Bishopton in western Renfrewshire, 13 miles (21 km) further west. The motorway was built in sections starting in 1964 and was finally completed in 2017. The city centre stretch of the M8 was originally planned to form part of a wider Glasgow Inner Ring Road, a proposed ring road encircling the city. The inner ring road plans were later abandoned. In 2017, a similar motorway ring around the eastern part of Glasgow was completed as part of the M74 extension.

The motorway begins at Junction 1 in the west of Edinburgh and travels westwards through West Lothian and North Lanarkshire to the north-eastern outskirts of Glasgow at Easterhouse, meeting the M73 at Baillieston Interchange. Previously the section of road between Junctions 6 and 8 in North Lanarkshire was incomplete and not built to motorway standard; the road instead used a small section of the A8. In 2017, the 'gap' was closed with a new six lane motorway built to connect both sides of the M8.

From here the M8 runs through the east of the city, where its character is unusual compared to other motorways in the UK, featuring illuminated overhead gantries, high mast lighting and exits and entrances to the motorway on the right and left hand sides. It connects indirectly to the M80 at Riddrie and to the A803 at Townhead junction before skirting around the city centre on an elevated viaduct.

It meets the A82 before dipping down through Charing Cross and then rising over the A814 (Argyle Street / Clydeside Expressway) before crossing the River Clyde on the Kingston Bridge. The bridge is 10 lanes wide and is the busiest road crossing in Europe, with traffic volumes of up to 150,000 vehicles per day.

After the bridge, the M8 merges with the M74 and M77 at Plantation, becoming one of the widest stretches of road in the UK, with 16 lanes providing connections between the three motorways. The M8 continues west past Ibrox and the A739 for the Clyde Tunnel, then out of the city to Braehead, Renfrew, Glasgow International Airport, and Erskine before continuing on to Greenock on the Firth of Clyde as the non-motorway A8.

=== M73 ===
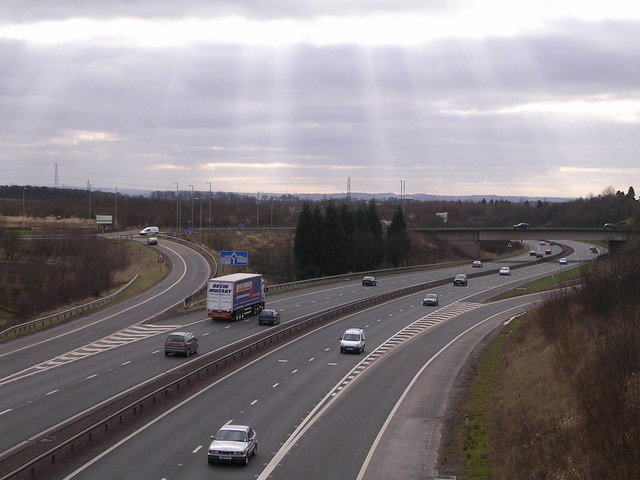
M73 Junction 2a

The M73 is a north-south link between the M74 and the M8 in the east of the city, allowing traffic to move between the two motorways which run east to west at that point. Construction began in 1969, with the M73 opening in 1972. In 2011, the M73 was extended north to link up with the M80 (and the A80), forming a motorway triangle to the north of the city. It is still a fairly short road, around 6.5 miles (10.5 km) long. In 2015, as part of the 'M8 M73 M74 Motorway Improvement Project', additional lanes were added to the southern part of the M73, making the southern part of the route four to five lanes wide in both directions.

=== M74 ===
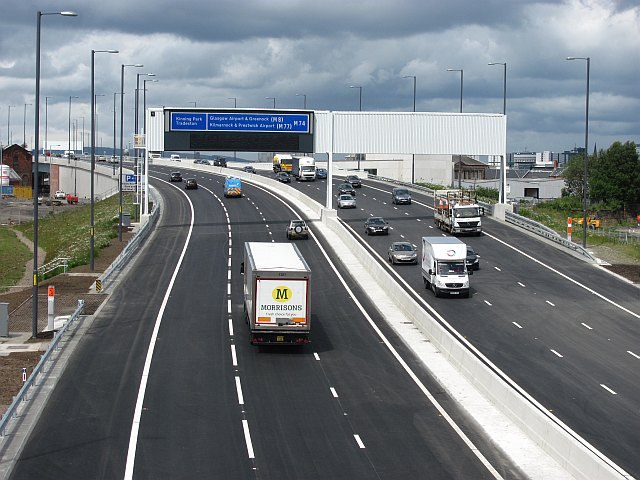
The M74 (2011 phase) looking north from Cathcart Road overbridge(A728) towards the point where it merges into the M8

The M74 runs from the city centre through the south east of the city, acting as a major route in and out of the city for the Lanarkshire suburbs; at Uddingston it connects to the M73 and expands to five lanes in each direction. It then turns to the south and continues to England. The M74 is Scotland's only motorway link to the rest of Great Britain and as such is one of the key cross-border routes between Scotland and England. Although the entire road is commonly referred to as the M74, it later becomes the A74(M) and then the M6 upon entering England.

Construction of the M74 began in 1964, and by 1999 the motorway stretched to Gretna, Dumfries and Galloway. The M74's northern extension from Kingston to Tollcross via Rutherglen was completed in 2011, finalising the original plan of a southern motorway across the city.

=== Other ===
The M77 begins in Glasgow at the M8 / M74 Plantation connection and runs south-west to Kilmarnock via Bellahouston, Pollok Country Park, the Silverburn Shopping Centre and Newton Mearns.

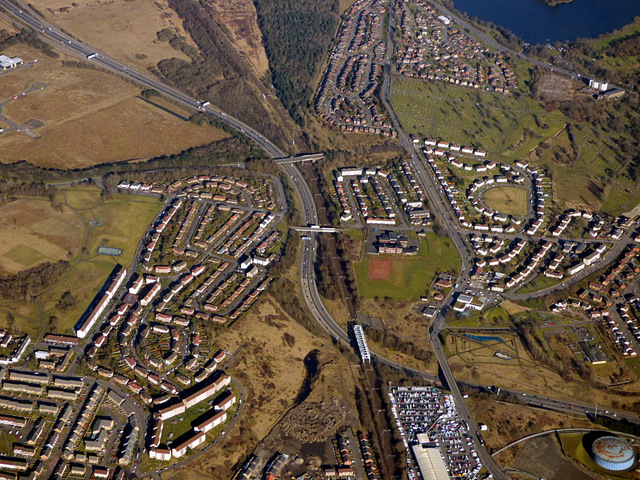
An aerial view of the M80 motorway looking east at Provanmill as it passes under the Cumbernauld Line railway tracks and the B765 Robroyston Road (2018)

The M80 runs between north-eastern Glasgow and the M9 motorway just south of Stirling, via Robroyston, Cumbernauld and Denny. The M80 diverges from the M8 motorway at Blochairn and eventually links up with the M73 outside the city at Mollinsburn. The road was constructed in three sections, the first opening in 1974, followed by further sections in 1992 and 2011.

The M898, located entirely in Renfrewshire outwith the city itself, connects the M8 to the Erskine Bridge, so is an important link avoiding the city centre for motorists from the likes of Dumbarton and Clydebank north of the Clyde. It is the highest numbered motorway in the UK and also the shortest, being less than a mile long. The Erskine Bridge is not classified as a motorway.

=== Bruce Report ===
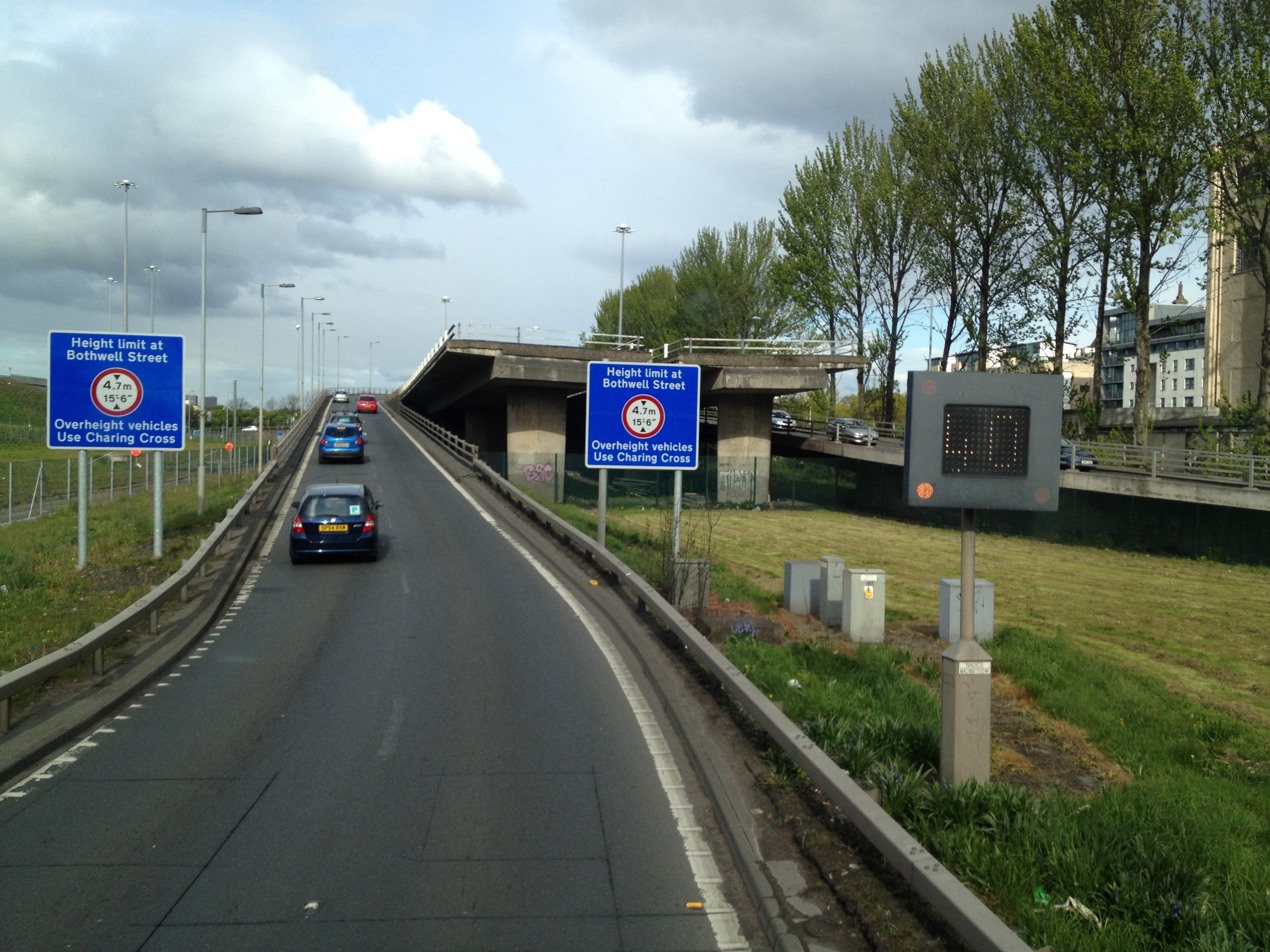
Unfinished Glasgow ring road

The construction of Glasgow's motorway network was originally proposed as part of the Bruce Report, which set out an ambition for a modern, efficient transport network for the city. This included miles of new motorway, bridges, tunnels and railway and resulted in the creation of the M8, M74 and M77 roads as well as the Clyde Tunnel and Clydeside Expressway. The implementation of the Bruce Report was at the time controversial as it required the destruction of several communities and historic buildings in the path of the routes; however in recent times it has been recognised as contributing to Glasgow's relatively low level of inner-city congestion and low journey times for people travelling across the city.

Not all projects from the Bruce Report were fully implemented, notably the final part of the city's inner ring road which was meant to complete a motorway box around the city centre. This is unlikely ever to be completed as in 2008, the Scottish Government began construction of the M74 northern extension following a similar route to the south west portion of the inner ring road.

The extension connected the M74 to the M8, forming a motorway box around the eastern part of Glasgow similar to, but slightly larger than that originally envisioned in the Bruce Report. The extension opened to traffic in 2011 and succeeded in its goals of reducing traffic on the congested M8 and improving safety and journey times around the city.

Following the completion of the M74 northern extension, the city has now started construction on the Glasgow East End Regeneration Route which will connect the M74 northern extension with the M8 motorway at the M80 interchange forming a second, smaller box closer to the city centre. Phases 1 and 2 of the project are complete, with phase 3 currently under construction.

== Other roads ==
In addition to the motorways, there are trunk roads - key strategic routes maintained by central government.

- A8
- A74
- A77
- A80
- A81
- A89
- A82
- A724
- A725
- A726
- A727
- A728
- A730
- A736
- A737
- A739 (Clyde Tunnel)
- A749
- A761
- A803
- A804
- A814 (Clydeside Expressway)
- A879

== Cycling ==
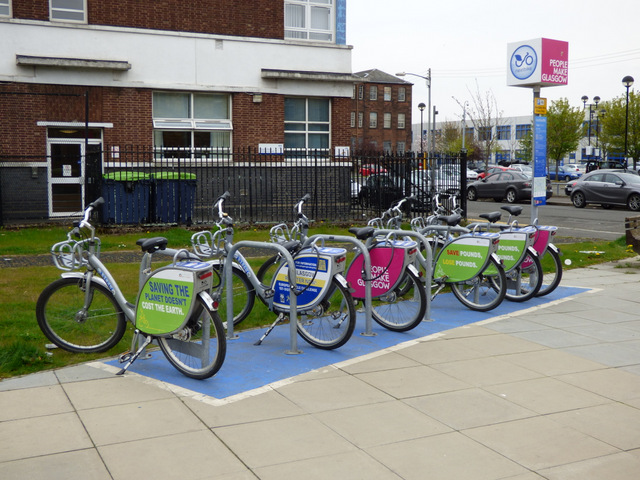
Nextbike cycle hire point

In July 2014, Glasgow City Council began a cycle hire scheme with 400 bikes at 31 locations around Glasgow. The scheme proved a success within two years, and the scheme's operator NextBike won a contract to expand the scheme to 900 bikes at 100 locations.

Sustrans' National Cycle Network maps three routes through Glasgow: the 7, 75 and 756. Route 74, which follows the old A74 for much of its length, terminates at the suburb of Rutherglen, while route 754 follows the towpath of the Forth and Clyde Canal north of the city.

== Buses ==
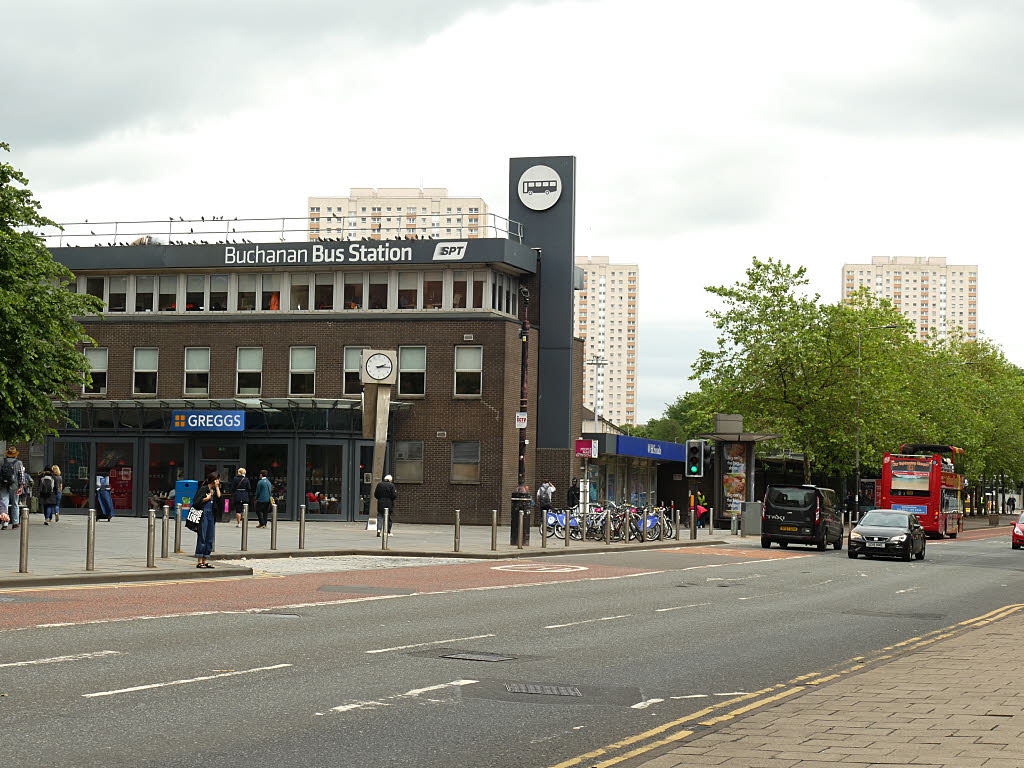
Buchanan bus Station

Deregulation of bus services began in October 1986. Since that time, bus operators have been able to start new services, change services, or cancel existing services by giving 42 days notice to the relevant authorities; in Scotland this has since changed to 56 days notice with an additional 14-day consultation period over and above this. Operation of non commercial services that SPT deem to be socially necessary may be awarded by competitive tender.

Glasgow City Council has invested in 'bus corridors' focusing on main bus routes with real time information, and bus priority measures. The Greater Glasgow Passenger Transport Executive (GGPTE), formerly the municipal transport operator, is now privately owned by First Glasgow.

The largest bus operators in the City are:

- First Glasgow – the successors to the former Glasgow Corporation Transport Department, and the former Central and Kelvin subsidiaries of the Scottish Bus Group.
- McGill's Bus Services – the successors to the former Arriva Scotland West. McGill's took over on 26 March 2012.
- Stagecoach Glasgow – the successors to the former Western subsidiary of the Scottish Bus Group, with their Stagecoach Glasgow company competing on certain city routes.
- West Coast Motors – independent company providing services in the North West Glasgow area.

Buchanan bus station is owned and run by SPT, and is a terminus for both local and long-distance services.

== Rail ==
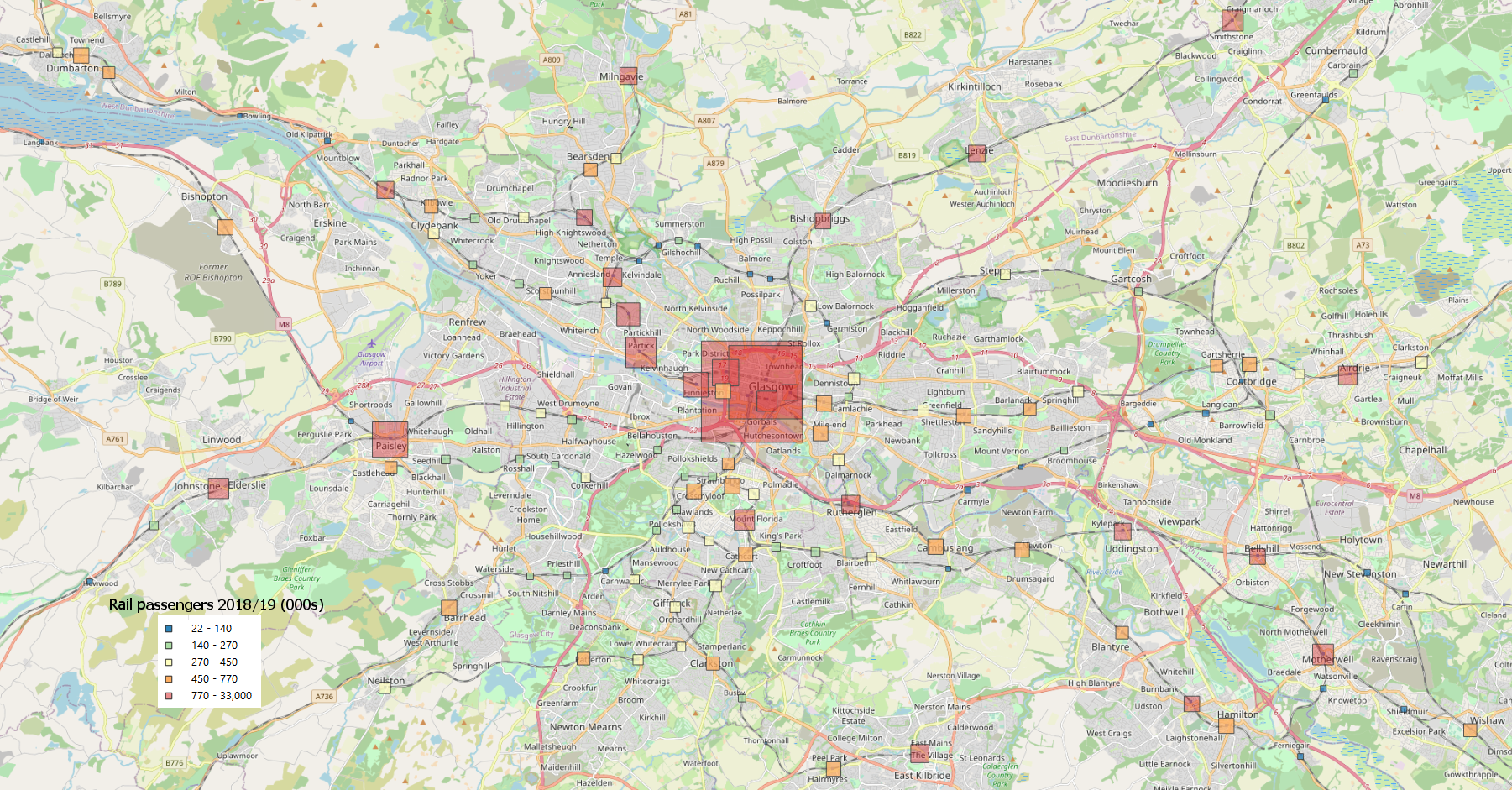
Rail passengers in and around the Glasgow area, 2018–19

Glasgow has one of the densest heavy-rail networks in the United Kingdom outside London, with 186 stations across the Greater Glasgow area. The suburban railway is run by ScotRail, and is centred around the two main terminus stations, Glasgow Central and Glasgow Queen Street stations.

Glasgow Central primarily serves routes to the south of the city, such as those in Lanarkshire, Ayrshire and links to the rest of the UK. Queen Street mainly serves trains to the north of Scotland. Both stations have underground platforms which serve trains running east-west across the city.

Plans were devised in the post-war period to redevelop Glasgow as a whole. As part of the resulting "Bruce Report", it was proposed that Queen Street Station be demolished and replaced as a bus station and garage. Under this scheme, only the low-level Queen Street Station would be kept, as part of the suburban rail system, and a new purpose-built Glasgow North Station would be constructed on the site of Buchanan Street station.

This plan was never followed through, and Queen Street operates to this day, although Buchanan Street station closed in the 1960s. The chosen site for the Glasgow North Station is now occupied by the Buchanan bus station, the Buchanan Galleries shopping centre, the Royal Concert Hall, and the Glasgow Passport Office. Glasgow and District Transport Plans from 1951 show the layout of the proposed station.

Previously, two other terminus stations served Glasgow. St Enoch railway station was sited on St Enoch Square, a few blocks away from Central Station whilst Buchanan Street railway station was sited at the north end of the street bearing the same name. Both stations were removed in the 1960s as a result of the Beeching cuts. The St. Enoch Centre was built on the site of the old St Enoch Station in the 1980s, and Buchanan House, headquarters of Transport Scotland and Glasgow Caledonian University now stand on the site formerly occupied by Buchanan Street station.

=== Future plans ===
Locals have long pressed for a link which will join the two halves of the urban railway network together, making possible through journeys via the central area without having to disembark at either Central or Queen Street and traverse the city centre by foot or road. The Glasgow Crossrail initiative has been on the drawing board for many years but still awaits funding from central government, despite the favourable outcomes of a feasibility study carried out in 2003.

Plans to connect Glasgow to London by a 270 mph (430 km/h) Transrapid (German Maglev train) emerged in June 2005. This proposal was shelved in favour of the proposed High Speed 2 scheme from London to Birmingham, which may be extended to Glasgow.

There were also plans to connect Glasgow city with Glasgow International Airport, via a new rail link which was estimated to bring around 700 new jobs to the Paisley area. The Act of Parliament authorizing construction of the link was passed by the Scottish Parliament in November 2006 and received Royal Assent in January 2007. It was expected that the link would be in operation by 2013, but it was cancelled by the Scottish Parliament in 2009 as a cost-cutting measure.

== Subway ==
A train arrives at West Street station

Glasgow is one of three British metropolitan areas that has an underground metro system, the others being London and Newcastle. The Glasgow Subway, previously Glasgow Underground, was built in 1896 and substantially modernized in 1977. It has a single circular route. This, taken together with the orange-coloured paintwork of the carriages, has led to it being known, by guidebooks more than the locals who still refer to it as the "Subway", as "The Clockwork Orange" after the 1971 film.

Despite being the third oldest subway system in the world, after London's and Budapest's, it has never been expanded beyond its original route. Reasons given for this have invariably related to Glasgow's geology: the tunnels are excavated from rock, and for this reason they are also smaller than London's. An SPT study into a possible expansion of the subway had been mooted. It would extend further into the West End, East End and Southside of the city which may cost up to £800 million to build. Much of this expansion might utilize disused railway tunnels that have been abandoned since the Beeching cuts of the 1960s.

== Other transport ==
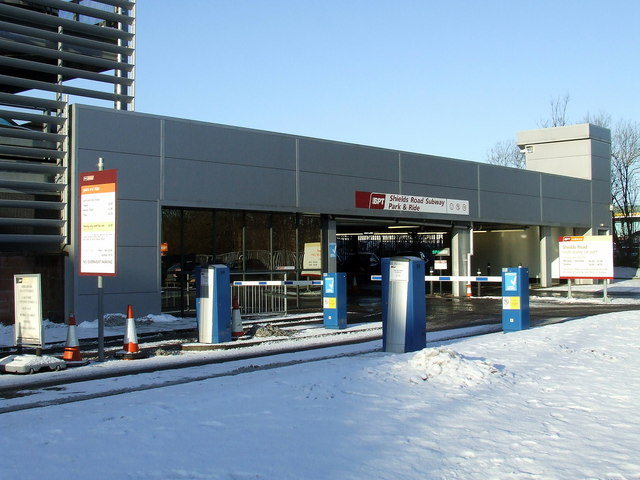
The entrance to the subway park and ride at Shields Road station

Glasgow has a well developed network of park and ride sites operated by SPT or Scotrail. These exist at railway and subway stations across the greater Glasgow area. The Glasgow Subway has three park and ride sites with a total of 1,109 spaces with at least 10,000 further spaces spread out across the local rail network.

== Historical Transport ==
=== Tramways ===
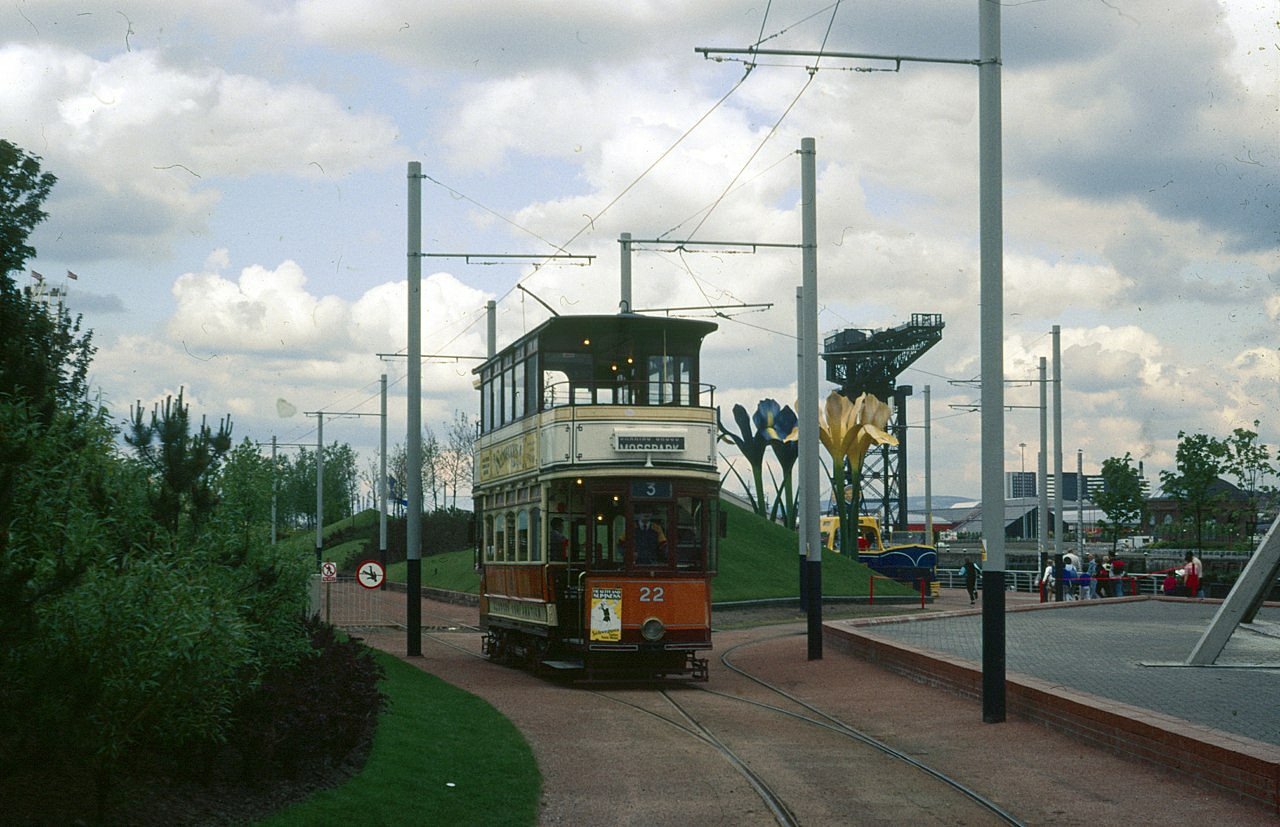
A tram at the Glasgow Garden festival

Glasgow had for many years an extensive system of trams that ran on the city's streets alongside other traffic. It was one of the largest in Europe. By the 1950s much of the vehicle stock was over 30 years old and in need of replacement. The trams were becoming less used as car use increased, and gradually the tram network was phased out across the city, including many routes that were still fairly well used and reckoned to be economically viable. The last tram in the city ran on 4 September 1962; 250,000 people lined the streets to watch. It was the last city tram network in Britain until 1992.

In the late 1980s and early to mid-1990s there emerged a plan to create a Strathclyde Tram Project, which would have seen the reintroduction of trams to Glasgow. Strathclyde Passenger Transport Executive on the behalf of Strathclyde Regional Council prior to local government reorganisation in 1996 published a set of plans for this system, going so far as to distribute pamphlets across the city outlining these plans and the proposed routes.

The initial line proposed was a 20-kilometre route run from Maryhill in the Northwest of the city to Easterhouse on Glasgow's Eastern fringe. It was envisaged that the line would use disused railway lines and tunnels as well as running in part on roads in the city alongside other traffic. The plan then outlined future expansion of the tram network so that it might one day stretch across the Greater Glasgow area.

There were objections to these proposals, amongst them from Strathclyde Buses, who it could be argued did so out of fear of their profit margins being affected by such an initiative. This necessitated a public inquiry, which lasted around 10 weeks. The Parliamentary Commissioners appointed to deliberate on the matter met and discussed the conclusions of this inquiry in a matter of hours before finding in favour of the objections raised thus killing off the Strathclyde Tram Project. The reasoning of the Commissioners is unknown as there existed no obligation for them to reveal it.

There is a proposal to reintroduce trams. Again, as in 1996, this would be a light rail system to Glasgow. This came in light of similar proposals, completed in 2014, to reintroduce trams to Edinburgh. The Glasgow City Council and SPT have commissioned a £500,000 study into the viability of such a system, which would initially operate from the city centre to the new Glasgow Harbour site. I would cross the River Clyde to the Southern General Hospital and through Govan and along the south bank of the Clyde before crossing the river again back into the city centre. There are proposals to run trams further than this route, out to the Braehead shopping centre and possibly Glasgow Airport; to Clydebank; and across the rest of the city.

Presently SPT has decided that this route will not see trams running along it, but rather an "ultra-modern" bus service termed "Clyde Fastlink" will operate part of the route, running from the city centre to the Glasgow Harbour area. SPT has stated that it is leaving open the option of laying tram lines on this route and replacing the buses with a light rail system.

=== Trolleybuses ===
Glasgow Corporation Transport Department operated a small trolleybus system between 1949 and 1967, using electricity generated from the same power station as the trams.

== See also ==
- Transport in Aberdeen
- Transport in Edinburgh
- Transport in Scotland
