= List of road junctions in the United Kingdom: D =

This is a partial list of road junctions in the United Kingdom.

Many road junctions are named after pubs. For more information regarding the derivation of pub names, see pub names.

== D ==
Junction Name	Type	Location	Roads	Grid Reference	Notes
Daisymount	Interchange	Whimple, East Devon	A30; B3174 (Exeter Road); B3180; unclass. (Exeter Road)	50.7514°N 3.3326°W	Named on roadsign on A30
Dalby Bar		Dalby, Lincolnshire	A16; unclass.	TF405709	
Dalby Intersection		Old Dalby, Leicestershire	A46; A6006 Wide Lane; A6006 Paddy's Lane	52°47′52″N 1°02′37″W	
Daldowie		Broomhouse, Glasgow	M74 J3A; A74 Hamilton Road; A721 Glasgow Road	55°50′08″N 4°06′44″W	
Dancing Cross		Maperton, Somerset	unclass. (formerly A303); Clapton Lane; unclass.	ST672269	
Daneholes Roundabout: aka Sockett's Heath		Sockett's Heath, near Grays, Thurrock (formerly part of Essex)	A1013 Lodge Lane (old A13); A1013 Stanford Road (old A13); B149 Wood View; Rectory Road; Blackshots Lane	51°29′20″N 0°20′34″E	
Daniels Grave	Staggered	Puddington, Mid Devon		50.8730°N 3.6319°W	Named on fingerpost
Danson Interchange		Bexley, LB Bexley	A2 Rochester Way; A220 Blackfen Road; A221 Penhill Road; A221 Danson Road; B2210 Blendon Road	51°26′57″N 0°07′11″E	
Darby's Corner	Roundabout Interchange	Poole, Dorset	B3074 Canford Heath Road / Lower Blandford Road; A349 Gravel Hill / Waterloo Road	50.75042°N 1.98361°W	
Darenth Interchange	Roundabout Interchange	Dartford, Kent	M25 J2; A2 Dartford Bypass; A282 Dartford Tunnel Approach Road	51°25′36″N 0°14′18″E	
Dartford Heath		Dartford, Kent	A2 Dartford Bypass; A2018 Old Bexley Lane	TQ515730	
Dartmeet		Dartmoor	B3357; B3387; Unclassiified road to Badger's Holt	50.5433°N 3.8754°W	Also junction of East Dart and West Dart
Dartmouth Circus		Birmingham, West Midlands	A4540 J13; A38(M) Aston Expressway; A38 Aston Road; A5127 Aston Road	SP077883	
Dawson's Corner		Farsley, Leeds, West Yorkshire	A647 Stanningley Bypass; A647 Bradford Road; A6120 Ring Road Farsley; B6157 Bradford Road	53°48′22″N 1°41′02″W	
Daybell Roundabout		Moira, Leicestershire	B5003 Ashby Road; Daybell Road	52°44′27″N 1°31′30″W	
Deadman's Corner		Yoxford, Suffolk	A1120; unclass.	TM383699	
Deepdene Roundabout		Dorking, Surrey	A24 Deepdene Road; A25 Reigate Road	TQ172498	
Denbigh Roundabout		Denbigh, Milton Keynes	H10 Bletcham Way; V7 (B4034) Saxon Street	52°00′16″N 0°43′37″W	
Denham Roundabout	Magic Roundabout Interchange	Denham, Buckinghamshire	M40 J1; A40 Oxford Road; A40 Western Avenue; A412 Denham Road; A4020 Oxford Road; Denham Court Drive	51°33′41″N 0°29′45″W	
Dennis Down Cross	Crossroads	Hittisleigh, Mid Devon	unclassified roads to: Hittisleigh; Crediton Bishop; Whiddon Down; Spreyton	50.7338°N 3.8116°W	Named on fingerpost at junction
Denton Island	Roundabout Interchange	Denton, Tameside, Greater Manchester	M60 J24; M67 J1; A57 Manchester Road	SJ910955	
Denton Roundabout	Roundabout	Newhaven, East Sussex	A259 The Drove; B2109 Avis Road; A259 Seaford Road	TQ 45472 01908	
Devil's Dyke Interchange	Grade Separated double roundabout above A27	Brighton & Hove	A27; Devil's Dyke Road; Mill Road; Devil's Dyke Avenue; A2038 King George VI Avenue	TQ 28465 08161	
Digmoor Interchange		Skelmersdale, Lancashire	M58 J5; A577 Stannanought Road; unclass.	53°31′59″N 2°44′59″W	
Dishforth Interchange		Dishforth, North Yorkshire	A1(M) J49; A1 Leeming Lane; A168; Dishforth Road	54°08′58″N 1°26′10″W	
Dobbie's Loan		Glasgow	M8 J16; A804 Dobbie's Loan; A879 Craighall Road	55°52′14″N 4°15′07″W	see also Craighall
Dock Spur roundabout		Felixstowe, Suffolk	A14 J60; A154	TM289363	
Dodge Cross		Sherborne, Dorset	A30 Cold Harbour; Underdown Lane	ST647175	
Dog Down Cross	T junctions	Huntsham, Tiverton, Devon		50.9833°N 3.4179°W	
Dog in a Doublet	Crossroads	North Side, Whittlesey	B1040 North Side; North Bank	52°34′41″N 0°07′10″W	Named after the pub and sluice at the junction
The Dome Roundabout	Roundabout	Watford, Hertfordshire	A41 North Western Avenue; A412 St Albans Road	51°40′52″N 0°23′34″W	
Dovers Corner		Rainham, LB Havering	A1306 New Road (formerly A13); A125 Rainham Road; B1335 Bridge Road	51°31′19″N 0°11′25″E	
Downs Barn Roundabout		Downs Barn, Milton Keynes	H4 Dansteed Way; V8 Marlborough Street	52°03′17″N 0°45′12″W	
Dowrich Bridge	T junction	Sandford, Devon	Coppice Lane; Signpost Lane	50.8288°N 3.6674°W	Named on fingerpost
Dowrich Cross	T junction	East Village, Devon	Priorton Lane	50.8314°N 3.6666°W	
Dracaena Cross Roads	Crossroads	Falmouth, Cornwall	A39 Dracaena Avenue; unclass. Kimberley Park Road	50.15465°N 5.08165°W	
Drake Circus		Plymouth	A374 Charles Street / Cobourg Street; B3250	50.3737°N 4.1386°W	Formerly a large oval roundabout (circus); was demolished and rebuilt as a simpler one in the 1960s
Dreghorn Junction	Roundabout Interchange	Dreghorn, Edinburgh	A720 City of Edinburgh Bypass; Dreghorn Link	NT231681	
Drift Bridge		Epsom, Surrey	A240 Reigate Road; A2022 College Road	51°19′40″N 0°14′04″W	
Drift Lane Cross	T junction	Sheldon, Honiton, Devon	Drift Lane; Shoots Lane	50.8660°N 3.262°W	Named on fingerpost
Drover's Roundabout		Ashford, Kent	A20 Simone Weil Avenue; A20 Maidstone Road; A292 Maidstone Road; A28	51°09′25″N 0°51′38″E	Named after the tin cows on it
Dumbreck Interchange		Glasgow	M77 J1; B768 Dumbreck Road	55°50′25″N 4°18′32″W	
Dumbreck Road Junction		Glasgow	M8 J23; A761 Paisley Road West; B768 Drumbreck Road	55°50′55″N 4°18′36″W	
Dryhill Cross	T junction	Stoodleigh, Mid Devon		50.9637°N 3.5291°W	Named on fingerpost
Dungeons Cross	T junction	Cullompton, Devon		50.8355°N 3.3564°W	Named on fingerpost
Dunmow South		Great Dunmow, Essex	A120; A130; B184 Chelmsford Road	TL640204	
Dunsland Cross	T junction	Bradford, Devon	A3072 E/W; A3079 S	50.8125°N 4.2653°W	Named on road sign
Dunsley Corner	Crossroads	Stow-cum-Quy, Cambridgeshire	A1303 Newmarket Road (formerly A45); Albert Road	52°13′09″N 0°14′04″E	
Dunstall Cross		Burton upon Trent, Staffordshire	Rangemore Hill; Dunstall Hill; Forest Road	52°47′03″N 1°44′27″W	
Dunton Island		Kingsbury, Warwickshire	M42 J9; A446 Lichfield Road; A4097 Kingsbury Road	52°32′19″N 1°43′36″W	It seems that SIs and other official documents refer to this both as Dunton Island and Dunton Interchange
Durleymoor Cross	Crossroads	Holcombe Rogus, Devon		50.9519°N 3.3507°W	
Dutch House Roundabout		Monkton, Ayrshire	A77 Kilmarnock Road; A77 Monkton Bypass; A78 Monkton Bypass; Kilmarnock Road	NS366287	
