= A roads in Zone 7 of the Great Britain numbering scheme =

The numbering zones for A-roads in Great Britain

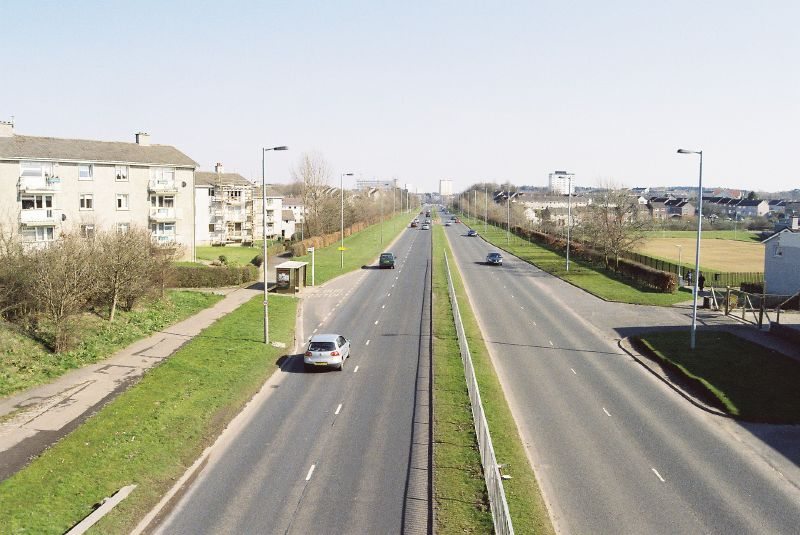
A726 in East Kilbride

List of A roads in the zone 7 in Great Britain starting north of the Solway Firth/Eden Estuary, west of the A7 and south of the A8 (roads beginning with 7). Data from Openstreetmap.

== Single and double digit roads ==
Road	From	To	Notes
A7	Carlisle	Edinburgh	92 miles (148 km) long. One of the longest trunk routes in Scotland.
A70	Ayr	Edinburgh	74 miles (119 km) long. The 2012 Collins Big Road Atlas shows the A70 as one of the five most dangerous roads in Scotland based on serious and fatal accidents between 2007 and 2009 in proportion to traffic.
A71	Irvine	Edinburgh	Around 70 miles (112 km) long.
A72	Hamilton	Galashiels	63 miles (101 km) long.
A73	Abington	Cumbernauld	37 miles (60 km) long.
A74	Viewpark	Glasgow	Used to continue down the modern day B7078 and B7076 all the way to Gretna. However, this task is now completed by the M74 and the A74(M) south of Abington.
A75	Gretna	Stranraer	
A76	Dumfries	Kilmarnock	
A77	Portpatrick	Glasgow	
A78	Greenock	Monkton	
A79	Ayr	Glasgow Prestwick Airport	7.5 miles (12.1 km) long, making it the second shortest 2-digit A-road in the UK.

== Three and four digit numbers ==
Road	From	To	Notes
A700	Sciennes, Edinburgh	New Town, Edinburgh	
A701	Dumfries	Edinburgh	Originally went south from Leadburn via current A703 to Peebles; road was rerouted later.
A702	St. John's Town of Dalry	Edinburgh	
A703	Peebles	Edinburgh City Bypass junction 6, Lothianburn	Runs as A701 between Bilston and Leadburn, Midlothian. Route primarily within Scottish Borders Council district, southeastern Scotland.
A704	Miller's Moss	West Calder	
A705	Whitburn	Livingston	
A706	Lanark	Bo'ness	Replaced by A801 between Torphichen and Standhill. Formerly A8 between Standhill and Whitburn. The former alignment is now the B8084.
A707	Selkirk	Clovenfords	
A708	Moffat	Selkirk	The 2012 Collins Big Road Atlas shows the A708 as one of the five most dangerous roads in Scotland based on serious and fatal accidents between 2007 and 2009 in proportion to traffic. Formerly continued south to Dumfries; this section became part of the A701.
A709	Lockerbie	Dumfries	
A710	Dumfries	Dalbeattie	
A711	Dumfries	Argrennan	
A712	Crocketford	Newton Stewart	via New Galloway
A713	Castle Douglas	Ayr	
A714	Kirkinner	Girvan	
A715			The 1922 route was from Whitecrook to Corner House. In the mid-1920s the route was partially swapped with the B736, with the A715 now running from Genoch to Sandhead. The original section from Kildrochet to Corner House became a portion of the A716 in the mid-1920s and by 1927 the original route from Genoch to Kildrochet returned to Class I status as the A757. Both former routes were downgraded between 1988 and 1993; the later route is now the B7084 and the portion that became the A757 is now the B7077.
A716	Whiteleys	Drummore	
A717	Stranraer	Stranraer	
A718	Stranraer	Kirkcolm	
A719	Turnberry	North of Fenwick	Passes over the Electric Brae.
A720	Musselburgh	South Gyle	Edinburgh City Bypass. Number formerly applied to a road from A702 north of Abington to A72 in Symington; this is now part of the A73.
A721	Kirkdean (Peeblesshire)	Broomhouse	Formerly continued west concurrent with the A74 to Hamilton Road, and then followed Hamilton Road and Tollcross Road to the A89.
A722	Wishaw	Newmains	
A723	Strathaven	Holytown	
A724	Rutherglen	Hamilton	Number formerly applied to a road from A721 to A74 in Hamilton; this became part of the A74 (now B7071), and the number was reassigned to the old route of the A74.
A725	Coatbridge	East Kilbride at A726	Also known as the “Bellshill Bypass" from Shawhead to the Raith Interchange and the "East Kilbride Expressway" from the Raith to East Kilbride.
A726	A71 at Strathaven	A898 and B815 at Erskine	Re-routed via Glasgow Southern Orbital route in 2006 between East Kilbride and Newton Mearns. Other section runs via centre of Paisley. Both sections connect to the M77, but at different junctions two miles apart. Former A726 between Peel Park and Deaconsbank is now part of the A727.
A727	A726 at Philipshill, East Kilbride	A726 and M77 at Darnley	Number formerly (pre-1980s) applied to a road from A8 (now Trongate) in Gorbals Cross to A726 (now A727) in Clarkston; this is now Stockwell Street, A8, A730, Pollokshaws Road, Victoria Road, Queen's Drive, Langside Road, Grange Road, Battlefield Road, Holmlea Road, B762, and B767. A727 number recreated in 2006 following opening of Glasgow Southern Orbital route from Newton Mearns to East Kilbride, with new A727 taking over what would have been formerly numbered A726.
A728	Shawfield / Simshill	Parkhead / Gorbals	One part of the A728 forms the southern section of the Glasgow East End Regeneration Route, between Parkhead and Polmadie, roughly following the course of the abandoned Glasgow Outer Ring Road motorway proposals of the 1960s. The road was completed in 2012 as part of the Clyde Gateway project in preparation for the 2014 Commonwealth Games. The other part is separate, running south from near Glasgow city centre, passing Hampden Park. Ends at B roads - the B766/B762, which is unusual for an A road.
A729			Proposed for Gorbals side of A728. Number formerly (pre-1980s) applied to the northern part of Cathcart Street from A730 to Pollokshaws Road (then part of the A727) in Glasgow. This is now part of the A730.
A730	Cathkin Bypass (Whitlawburn)	Gorbals Cross	
A731	Ran via Glasgow Road/Shawfield Road and Main Street from the A730 to the A749 in Rutherglen. Declassified sometime after 1976.		
A732	Unused		Ran from the A8 at Gorbals Cross east to the A721 at Mount Vernon. Renumbered in 1936: the section from Bridgeton Cross to London Road became an extension of the A737 and the section along London Road became part of the A74 (old A74 became the A724 and A749).
A733	Unused		Ran from A77 northeast of Fenwick to the A71 at Galston, but was extended along the old B746 to the then-A758 (now A719) at Whitletts in the late 1920s. Renumbered as an extension of the A719 in 1934; the southernmost section is now part of the A77 Ayr bypass.
A734	Unused		Ran from Hurlford to Riccarton. The eastern portion became a portion of a rerouted A71 (old A71 became the B7073) and the western portion was renumbered to the B7072 in 1973.
A735	Kilmarnock	Lugton	
A736	Braehead	Irvine	Formerly (from its junction with the B762) went east via what is now the B762, B769 and Pollokshaws Road to the A77. Runs from the A8 near Braehead, via Crookston, Barrhead and Shilford, into Irvine.
A737	Irvine	Paisley	Formerly continued from Hollywood to Milliken Park (now B787), round the south east of Johnstone (now Beith Road; unclassified), to Elderslie (now B789) and onto Paisley to Glasgow (now A761 and A8), making it the road in the UK which has changed route the most times. Even in the present day, there are 3 new bypasses being built which will change the route of this road even further.
A738	Ardrossan	Kilwinning	Formerly A78 through Ardeer Square. Number formerly applied to a road from Stevenston to Ardrossan; this became the B780 in 2004 and the number was reused on the current routing.
A739	Cardonald	Bearsden	Incorporates the Clyde Tunnel in Glasgow. Designated as a primary route only through the tunnel and its approaches. Number formerly applied to a road from A78 (now A738) Ardrossan southwest to Ardrossan Harbour; this became part of the A738 and a spur of the A738, and is now part of the B780 and a spur of the B780.
A740	Unused		First used from Paisley to Old Kilpatrick. Renumbered as an extension of the A726 in 1934. Next used in 1968 from Glasgow Airport to Johnstone. Now the eastern extension of the A737.
A741	Paisley	Renfrew	
A742	Unused		Ran from Greenock to Inverkip. Now part of the A78 (old A78 is now the A770).
A743	Lanark	Ravenstruther	
A744	Unused		Ran from Strathaven to Kirkfieldbank; was the B743 before it was upgraded. The section west of the A74 became an extension of the A726 in 1934, but the entire route was downgraded to the B7086 in the 1990s.
A745	Dalbeattie	Castle Douglas	
A746	Glasserton	Kirkinner	
A747	Glasserton	Glenluce	
A748	Unused		Ran from A75 at Dunragit to the A715 (now B7084); originally the B736 before it was upgraded. Declassified between 1988 and 1993.
A749	Glasgow	East Kilbride	
A750	Unused		Ran from Whithorn to Isle of Whithorn. Downgraded to a portion of the B7004 sometime after the 1970s.
A751	Aird, A75	Innermessan, A77	Link road connecting traffic between A75 and A77 bypassing Stranraer.
A752	Thorniewood	Muirhead	Originally ran from the A72 at Kaimrig End to Moffat; was the B713 before it was upgraded. Became a portion of a rerouted A701 in 1935.
A753	Unused		Ran from Carnwath to Kirkdean. Became an extension of the A721 in 1934.
A754	Unused		First used from Carluke to Carstairs; was the B716 before it was upgraded. Became an extension of the A721 in 1934. Next used after 1968 from the A8 north of Hillington south to the A736; was the B770 before it was upgraded. Now part of a rerouted A736.
A755	Kirkcudbright	Girthon	
A756	Dumfries	Maxwelltown	Route became a spur of the A75, but reverted to its original number when the A75 was rerouted.
A757	Unused		Ran from Genoch Square to Lochans; not in the 1922 Road Lists, but designated around 1927. The eastern portion was the A715 before it swapped with the B736. Now downgraded to the B7077.
A758	Unused		Ran from Whitletts to Mauchline. May have initially been a B road, but this has not been confirmed. The western section within the A77 Ayr bypass is now part of the A719 and the rest downgraded to the B743.
A759	Troon	Kilmarnock	
A760	Largs	Lochwinnoch	
A761	Ibrox	Port Glasgow	Southern end formerly at Elderslie where it met the original A737.
A762	Tongland Bridge	St John's Town of Dalry	
A763	Cambuslang	Carmyle	
A764	Unused		Ran from Portpatrick to Portslogan; originally a portion of the B738. Created for no apparent reason as it served no destinations whatsoever. Returned to the B738 sometime after the 1970s.
A765	Unused		Ran from Ballantrae to Pinwherry; was the B739 before it was upgraded. Downgraded to the B734 (the B739 number was already in use elsewhere).
A766	Nine Mile Burn	Penicuik	
A767	Unused		Ran from Uphall to Mid Calder; was the B707 before it was upgraded. Renumbered to an extension of the B8046 (despite it being out-of-zone) due to completion of the New Town of Livingston.
A768	Bilston	Eskbank	
A769	Unused		Ran from Bogue to Balmaclellan, was the B7000 before it was upgraded. Downgraded to the B7075 before 1993.
A770	Inverkip	Greenock	Comprising the former western end of the A8 and former northern end of the A78.
A771	Cardwell Road, Gourock	Gourock Ferry Terminal	Using part of a former siding from Gourock railway station.
A772	Eskbank	Edinburgh	
~~A773~~ - ~~A774~~			Unused
A775	Mossend	Newhouse	
A776	Unused		Ran from East Kilbride to Burnbank; this was previously part of the A726 before it was rerouted. This became part of an extended A725, which was later rerouted onto the bypass. The old route with High Blantyre became the B7012.
~~A777~~			Unused
A778	Unused		Ran from A78 south via Main Street to Monkton; this was a portion of the A78 before it was rerouted. Declassified altogether in 1973 due to rerouting of the A79 away from Monkton.
A779	Livingston	Bathgate	
A780	Dumfries	Douievale	
A781	Buccleuch St, Dumfries	Dockhead, Dumfries	
~~A782~~ - ~~A799~~			Unused
A7002	Unused		Ran from A706 and A7066 to A705 in East Whitburn (this was a renumbering of part of the B7002); now part of the A801.
A7066	Boghall	Standhill	Formerly part of the A8 road (see also A89 and B7066).
A7071	Hamilton Road, Bothwell	Raith Interchange (A725)	Created 2017, formerly a spur of the B7071. Not signed as such; signage on the interchange refers only to the "B7071" while on the B7071 mainline the route is signed as "(A725)".

== See also ==
- B roads in Zone 7 of the Great Britain numbering scheme
- List of motorways in the United Kingdom
- Transport in Edinburgh#Road network
- Transport in Glasgow#Other Roads
- Transport in Scotland#Road network
