= B roads in Zone 7 of the Great Britain numbering scheme =

The numbering zones for roads in Great Britain

B roads are numbered routes in Great Britain of lesser importance than A roads. See the article Great Britain road numbering scheme for the rationale behind the numbers allocated. (some data from openstreetmap.org)

== Zone 7 (2 & 3 digits) ==
Road	From	To	Notes
B77	A77 north of Maybole	A77 south of Maybole	Former route of A77 through Maybole before bypass opened in 2022. All other B roads are numbered with three or four digits.
B700	Torphichen Place at A8	Lothian Road at A700	
B701	Moredun	Drumbrae	
B702	Straiton	Loanhead	
B703	Dalkeith	Newtongrange	
B704	Lasswade	Gorebridge	
B705	Auchinleck	Mauchline	
B706	Dunlop at A735	Beith at B7049	
B707	Auchentiber at A736	Highfield, North Ayrshire at A737 Dalry Bypass	
B708	Bathgate at A89	Bathville Cross, Armadale at B8084	
B709	A7, Langholm	A7, Heriot	
B710	Bowland, northwest of Galashiels, at A7	Caddonfoot at A707	through Clovenfords
B711	A7, southwest of Hawick	Tushielaw at B709	
B712	Rachan Mill, southeast of Biggar, at A701	bridge over River Lyne, west of Peebles, at A72	
B713	southwest of Catrine, at A76	Sorn, at B743	
B714	Saltcoats	Dalry	Also includes old A737 road through Dalry
B715	Forth, A706	A71, southwest of Fauldhouse	
B716 (defunct)	B766 in Croftfoot	B758 in Newton	Downgraded sometime after the 1970s.
B717	Eastfield, west of Harthill at B7066	West Tarbrax Farm, southwest of Stane, at A71	
B718	Blackridge, at A89	Harthill, at B7066	
B719	Greenhillstairs, at B7076	northwest of Moffat, at A701	
B720	A7, north of Canonbie	B6357, west of Canonbie	Former A7 before bypass
B721	Annan	Gretna	
B722	Annan	Langholm	
B723	Annan	Eskdalemuir	Former A74 before bypass by motorway
B724	Annan	Collin, A75	
B725	Waterbeck, at B722	Dumfries	
B726	Nithbank Hospital, Dumfries, at B725	Kingholm Quay, at unclassified road Kingholm Loaning	
B727	west of Dalbeattie, at A745	Gatehouse of Fleet, at B796	
~~B728~~	unused		
B729	A76, north of Dumfries	Moniaive A702, Carsphairn A713	A702 subsumes the B729 route for two miles east of Moniaive
B730	north of Patna, at A713	Dreghorn, Irvine, at B7081	
B731	west of Thornhill, at A702	south of Thornhill, at A76	
B732	west of Thornhill, at A702	north of Thornhill, at A76	
B733	northwest of Kirkcowan, at A75	Wigtown, at A714	
B734	Girvan, at A77	Pinmore, south of Girvan, at A714	scenic route via Barr
~~B735~~	unused		
B736	west of Palnackie, at A711	west of Castle Douglas, at A75	
B737	Stair Drive, Stranraer, at A77 and A75	Leswalt Road, Stranraer, at A718	
B738	Kirkcolm, at A718	Portpatrick, at A77	scenic route
B739	corner of Glasgow Prestwick Airport, Monkton, at A79	east of Ayr, at A719	
B740	Blackburn Farm, northwest of Abington, at B7078	Sanquhar, at A76	
B741	Girvan, at A77	New Cumnock, at A76	via Dalmellington
B742	between Maybole and Minishant, at A77	east of Glasgow Prestwick Airport, at A77	A77 will soon be bypassed by Maybole Bypass
B743	Prestwick / Muirkirk	A70 near Sorn / Strathaven	
B744	Belston (A70)	Galston (A719)	
B745	Drumclog, at A71	Dungavel Farm, at B743	
B746	south of Loans, at A78, to Loans, at A759	Troon town centre, at A759, to northeast Troon, also at A759	road is in 2 distinct segments
~~B747~~	unused		
B748	South Harbour Street, Ayr, at A719	South Harbour Street, unclassified road	less than 0.5 miles long
B749	A79	Troon Harbour	
B750	Dundonald town centre, at B730	east of Dundonald, at A759	
B751	opposite M77 from Fenwick, at A77	northeast of Symington, at B730	via Kilmaurs
B752	east Stevenston, at A738	unclassified road Shore Road, Ardeer	
B753	west Coatbridge, at A89	Coatdyke, at A89	Coatbridge southern ring road, via Whifflet
B754	Overtown	A723, Motherwell	
B755	west Hamilton, at A72 and A724	Fairhill, south Hamilton, at A723	
B756	Uddingston, at B7071	Viewpark, at A724	
B757	M80	Milton of Campsie	
B758	Calderbraes, at A721	High Blantyre, at A725 East Kilbride Expressway	
B759	Busby at A727	Cambuslang at A724	
~~B760~~	unused		
B761	College Milton, East Kilbride at A726	The Village, East Kilbride at A725	
B762	Pollok at A736	Eastfield, Rutherglen at A724	
B763	Crossmyloof, at B768	Haghill, at A8	via Oatlands
B764	Eaglesham, at junction where Moor Road, Montgomery Street and Polnoon Street meet	East Kilbride at A726	Formerly continued down length of Moor Road to Fenwick Moor at A77.
B765	Carmyle	Auchinairn	
B766	Thorntonhall Roundabout, at A727	Battlefield, at B768	
B767	Cathcart, Glasgow at B762	Eaglesham at B764	Northern section (Clarkston Road) was formerly part of the original A727
B768	Eastfield, Rutherglen	Ibrox	
B769	Stanecastle roundabout, Irvine	B768 at Pollokshields	via Stewarton
B770 (defunct)	A8 east of Renfrew	A736 at Nitshill	Upgraded to Class I status as the A754 (now A736) after the 1960s.
B771	Dykebar, Paisley, at A726	Barrhead, at A736	
B772 (defunct)	A726 in Paisley	A737 in Paisley	Upgraded to the A761; the western half has been dualled while the eastern half is unclassified as it has been bypassed by the A761.
B773	Darnley, at A726	Barrhead, at A736	
B774	Castlehead, Paisley, at A761	Barrhead, at B771	
B775	northwest Paisley, at A726	Caldwell, near Lugton, at B777	
B777	roundabout with A737 SW of Beith	junction with B780 south of Kilbirnie	by way of Glengarnock – passes Glengarnock railway station
B778	Kilwinning	Fenwick	
B779	Kilwinning, at A737	northern Irvine, at A737	no continuous route due to A78 Kilwinning and Irvine bypasses
B780	Stevenston	Kilbirnie	via Saltcoats, Ardrossan and Dalry
B781	Irvine	Dalry	
B782	West Kilbride town centre, at B781	Highthorn Wood, by Milstonford Farm, north of West Kilbride, at A78	
B783	between West Mains, East Mains and Lymekilns in East Kilbride	between East Mains, Calderwood and Nerston in East Kilbride	
B784	east of Camphill Water Treatment Works, west of Kilbirnie at A760	between Glengarnock and Dalry, at B780	
B785	Kilwinning	A736	
B786	Lochwinnoch, at A760	Kilmacolm, at A761	
B787	west Howwood, at A737	Johnstone, at B789	has a spur to A737 at Miliken Park
B788	east Greenock, at A8	south Kilmacolm, at A761	
B789	Langbank, at A8	west Paisley or Elderslie, at A761	
B790	Inchinnan Industrial Estate, at A726	Bridge of Weir, at A761	
B791	Renfrew Town Centre, at A8	southwest Renfrew, at A741	
B792	Blackburn, A705	West Calder, A71	
B793	Southwick Bus Stop, at A710	northeast of Dalbeattie, at A711	
B794	Dalbeattie, at A711 and A710	Corsock, on River Urr, at A712	
B795	northeast of Castle Douglas, at A75	Laurieston, Dumfries and Galloway at A762	
B796	southeast of Gatehouse of Fleet, at A75	Gatehouse Station and New Rusko, unclassified road	also includes spur to southwest of Gatehouse of Fleet
B797	Mennock, southeast of Sanquhar, at A76	Abington, at A702	through Leadhills and Wanlockhead
B798	Leswalt, northwest of Stranraer, at A718	next to Kirminnock Burn, at B738	
B799	southeast Chapelhall, at A73	east Holytown, at A773 and A723	

== Zone 7 (4 digits) ==
Road	From	To	Notes
B7000	St Johns Town of Dalry (A702)	High Bridge of Ken (B729)	
B7001	Viewpark	near Bellshill Bypass	
B7002	Roundabout, Bathgate (A801)	Bathgate, A89	
B7003	Penicuik, A701	Rosewell, A6094	
B7004	A746 near Kirkinner	Whithorn	
B7005	A747	A714 at Bladnoch	
B7006	Bilston, A701	B7003	
B7007	B709	A7, near Middleton	
B7008	West Calder	A70	
B7009	A707 at Selkirk	B709	
B7010	Longridge, A706	Stane, B717	
B7011	A71	A73	This road passes through Law Village.
B7012	Hamilton	near E Kilbride Expy	
B7013	Dalmellington	Dalmellington	
B7014	Selkirk	Selkirk	
B7015	Fauldhouse	Wilkieston, A71	
B7016	Broughton, A701	Rootpark, A706	
B7017	Lanark	Lanark	
B7018	near Kirkfieldbank	Lesmahagow	5 miles (8.04 km) long
B7019	Larkhall	Larkhall	
B7020	A701 south of Beattock	A75 west of Annan	
B7021	Whithorn	B7085 near Port William	
B7022	Girvan	Girvan	
B7023	Maybole	B741	
B7024	Ayr	Maybole	
B7025	Largs	Largs	
B7026	Howgate, A6094	Auchendinny, A701	
B7027	Challoch, A714	Barrhill, A714	
B7028 (defunct)	B799 north of Holytown	A73 Main Street in Chapelhall	Became a portion of a rerouted B799 by 1986.
B7029	Carfin	A73, near Bellside Rd.	
B7030	Newbridge Roundabout	Wilkieston	
B7031	Ayr	Maybole	
B7032	Wishaw	Wishaw	
B7033	Wishaw	Wishaw	
B7034	Hollybush	A77	
B7035	St Quivox	A77 near St Quivox	
B7036	Auchinleck	Ochiltree	
B7037	Galston	B743 near Sorn	
B7038	South end of Kilmarnock at A77	North end of Kilmarnock, by Fenwick	
B7039	A708	B7009	
B7040	A702 at Elvanfoot	B797 at Leadhills	5 3/4 miles (9.3 km) long
B7041	Drummore	near Maryport (Scotland)	
B7042	Sandhead, A716	A77, near Portpatrick	
B7043	Leswalt	B738, near Knocknain	
B7044 (defunct)	B734 at Knockdolian	A77 at Ballantrae	Recent maps indicate that the route has been downgraded and is no longer a B road; South Ayrshire Council lists the route as the C59. Whatever the result, the route is presumed to be defunct.
B7045	Straiton	A77	
B7046	B730	A70 Cumnock	
B7047	Cubrieshaw Street at West Kilbride	Chapleton Road at West Kilbride	
B7048	West Kilbride	West Kilbride	
B7049	A737 in Menrahead	A737 in Knowehead	Old routing of the A737 through Beith.
B7050			May have been used in Paisley along Underwood Road, connecting the A726 to the A761. At least one sign claims that the route is the B7050, most claim that the route is the southern extension of the B775.
B7051 (defunct)	A75 (now A714) in Dashwood Square	A75 in Barbuchany	Declassified, probably when the A75 Newton Stewart bypass opened.
B7052	B733 at Spittal	B7004 at Garlieston	
B7053 (defunct)	A89 in Shuttleston	A80 in Millerston	Decommissioned around 1980 due to construction of the M8: the northernmost quarter is unclassified and the remainder a portion of the B765.
B7054	B788 Greenock	A78 Greenock	
B7055	A70 Rigside	A702	
B7056	Crossford	A706	
B7057	Benhar Rd. near Shotts	Junction 5, M8	
B7058	Garrowhill	A74	
B7059	West Linton, A702	A72, near Peebles	Links the A701 to A702 and later on the A701 to the A72.
B7060	A707	A7	
B7061	A77	Fenwick	
B7062	A72, at Peebles	B709 at Traquair	
B7063	B7004	Isle of Whithorn	
B7064	Western Rd. Roundabout, Kilmarnock	Irvine Rd. Kilmarnock	
B7065	A716, near Balgowan	B7041 at Damnaglaur	
B7066	Carfin	Whitburn	Former A8 until bypassed by M8 (see also A89 and A706)
~~B7067~~	unused		
B7068	B709 at Langholm	Junction 17, A74(M) at Lockerbie	
B7069	Whitburn	Whitburn	
B7070	North Rd. Bellshill	Bellshill	
B7071	Uddingston	Hamilton	
B7072	Hurlford Rd. Kilmarnock	Riccarton	
B7073	Kilmarnock	A76 near Hurlford	
~~B7074~~	unused		
B7075	A702	near Balmaclellan	
B7076	A74(M) at Gretna	A702 at Elvanfoot	Former A74 before bypassed by motorway
B7077	A77 at Lochans	Genoch Square	
B7078	Nether Abington	High Merryton	Former A74 before bypassed by motorway
B7079	Newton Stewart	Newton Stewart	
B7080	Stanecastle	Long Dr. Roundabout at B7081	
B7081	Irvine	Kilmarnock	
B7082	Kilmarnock	near Kilmarnock	
B7083	A76 Auchinleck	A76 Cumnock	
B7084	Genoch Square	A75 near Glenluce	
B7085	A714 near Kirkinner	Port William	
B7086	Strathaven	Kirkmuirhill	
B7087	M77 in Newton Mearns	B769 Newton Mearns	Spur connecting B769 to M77 using Greenlaw Street. Around 500m long
B7088	A72 in Horsbrugh Ford	B7072 in Cardrona	
~~B7089~~ - ~~B7200~~	unused		
B7201	A7, Canonbie	A7, south of Canonbie	Former A7 before bypass of Canonbie, was B720 beforehand

== See also ==
- A roads in Zone 7 of the Great Britain numbering scheme
- List of motorways in the United Kingdom
- Transport in Edinburgh#Road network
- Transport in Glasgow#Other Roads
- Transport in Scotland#Road network
