= A801 road =

Road in Scotland

A801

Route information
- Length: 16 mi (26 km)

Major junctions
- North end: Polmont; 55.9885°N 3.6827°W
- South end: Blackburn; 55.8699°N 3.6477°W

Location
- Country: United Kingdom
- Constituent country: Scotland

Road network
- Roads in the United Kingdom; Motorways; A and B road zones

The A801 is a road in Scotland which runs from east of Polmont to the A705 near Whitburn that heads towards Livingston in the other direction.

The A801 provides a link from Junction 4 of the M8 to Junction 4 of the M9, creating easy access from traffic from Falkirk, Grangemouth or Stirling travelling to and from places in West Lothian like Livingston, Armadale or Bathgate.
