= A78 road =

Road in Scotland

A78

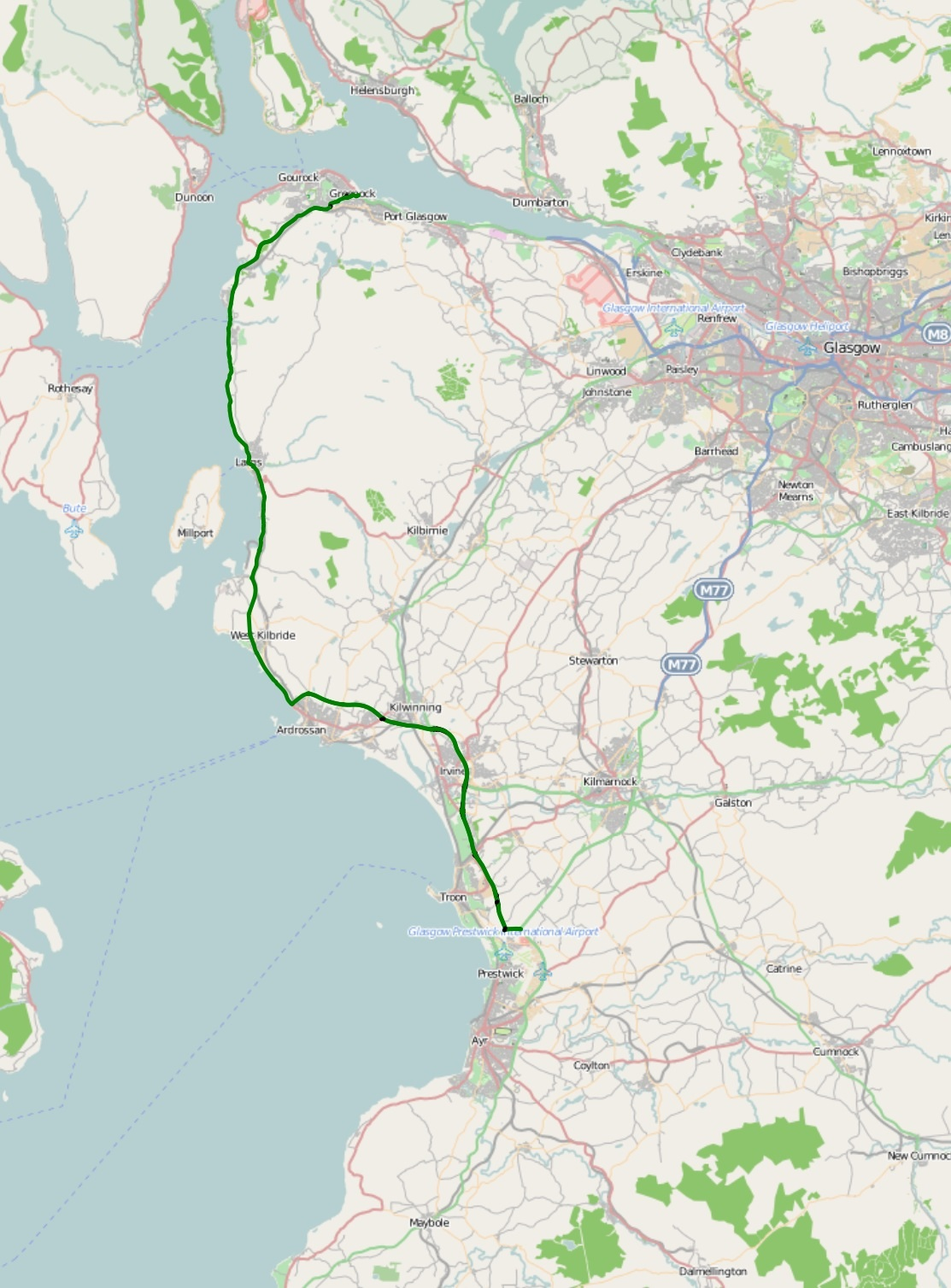
- Click map to enlarge

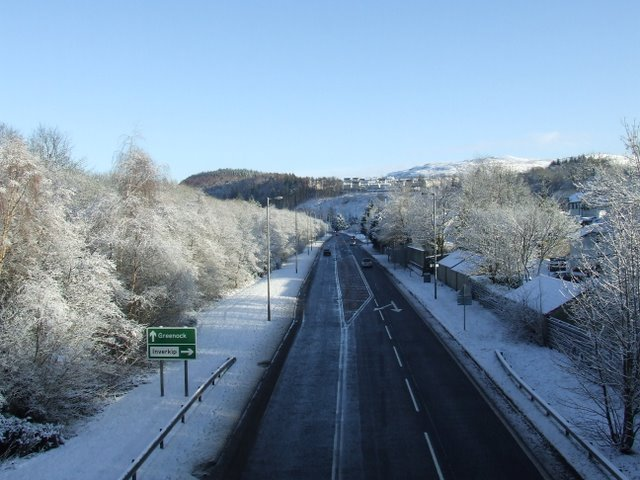
- A78 Inverkip bypass

Route information
- Length: 40.5 mi (65.2 km)

Major junctions
- North end: A8 / A770 in Greenock; 55.9484°N 4.7571°W

- A738 near Stevenston
- South end: A77 in Monkton; 55.5246°N 4.5906°W

Location
- Country: United Kingdom
- Primary destinations: Greenock, Largs, Irvine, Prestwick Airport, Ayr, Monkton, Troon

Road network
- Roads in the United Kingdom; Motorways; A and B road zones
← A77	→ A79

The A78 is an A road in Scotland. It connects Greenock and Prestwick on a route which follows the northern section of the Ayrshire coast.

== Route ==
The A78 begins in Greenock, Inverclyde as a continuation of the A8 road, at its junction with the A770 coast road via Gourock (the Bull Ring roundabout, to be changed to traffic light junction by 2027), and runs in a southerly direction through the Spango Valley, Inverkip, Wemyss Bay, Skelmorlie, Largs, Fairlie, Seamill and then bypasses the major towns of Ardrossan, Kilwinning, Irvine and Troon amongst others before terminating near Prestwick, Ayrshire, where it forms a junction with the A77.

== Infrastructure ==
Much of the road is single carriageway – both for a short distance through Greenock and a 21-mile stretch between Inverkip and Ardrossan.

The rest is dual carriageway – between the Eglinton and Warrix interchanges there are in fact 3 lanes in each direction, and the road is constructed to motorway standard (with full grade separation at junctions) save for a lack of hard shoulders. The road very rarely appears busy on this stretch – the adjacent New Town development area of Irvine, North Ayrshire (which includes Kilwinning, Dreghorn and Girdle Toll) had a population of just over 50,000 in the 2001 census; the town planners designed the infrastructure for a population more in the region of 120,000.

== Recent improvements ==
Until December 2004, the route of the A78 went through the "three towns" – namely Ardrossan, Saltcoats and Stevenston. The result was a highly congested section with numerous traffic lights making progress slow. To counter this a bypass was constructed with two additional entrance/exit points other than the ends in the form of roundabouts.

The section at the Ardrossan end is a single carriageway road with a climbing lane. The other two sections are dual carriageway with two lanes in each direction.

The existence of the bypass meant that the section through the towns previously labelled A78 became a continuation of the A738 which previously formed a concurrency with the A78 through Stevenston before diverging to form Boglemart Street and subsequently many other streets in Saltcoats and Ardrossan. Many sources available today still don't acknowledge these changes, for example Google Maps.

The new road can easily take 10 minutes off any journey which would otherwise involve travelling through the three towns and as a result has proven very popular amongst people who make such journeys – for example people from Largs and West Kilbride to the north who now have swifter access to the shopping facilities of Irvine and Ayr and the Morrisons supermarket at Stevenston, as well as any football fans who may be travelling to watch Kilmarnock FC.

== Flooding ==
Flooding is common during periods of high winds combined with a high tide on the coastal stretch between Largs and Skelmorlie. For this reason, closure gates are located at both the north end of Largs and the south end of Skelmorlie.

When the road is closed traffic between Largs and Greenock is often diverted along narrow country lanes with little room to pass any oncoming traffic. This has been known to cause widespread delays.

== In popular culture ==
A fictional insect-petting business operating from a disused warehouse on the A78 is a key location in fictional horror paperback-writer Nick Steen's giant insect-themed novel The Stealth-Hive Parallax in Garth Merenghi's TerrorTome.

== Junction list ==
Council area	Location	mi	km	Destinations	Notes
Inverclyde	Greenock	0.0	0.0	A8 east / A770 west (Dalrymple Street) / Container Way to M8 – Glasgow, Port Glasgow, Gourock	Northern terminus; western terminus of A8; eastern terminus of A770
Inverclyde	Greenock	3.6– 3.7	5.8– 6.0	IBM	Former junction
Inverclyde		4.8	7.7	A770 east – Gourock, Dunoon Ferry, Clyde-Argyll Ferry	Western terminus of A770
Inverclyde	Wemyss Bay	6.7– 7.0	10.8– 11.3	Hill Farm	Junction
North Ayrshire	Largs	15.0	24.1	A760 east (Haylie Brae) – Kilbirnie	Western terminus of A760
North Ayrshire	Ardrossan	24.7	39.8	A738 east (Eglinton Road) – Saltcoats, Ardrossan	Western terminus of A738
North Ayrshire	Stevenston– Kilwinning boundary	28.7	46.2	A738 (Stevenston Road / Kilwinning Road) to M8 / A737 – Kilwinning, Dalry, Beith, Stevenston, Saltcoats	
North Ayrshire	Kilwinning– Irvine boundary	30.7– 31.3	49.4– 50.4	A737 – Dalry, Kilwinning, Irvine	Junction
North Ayrshire	Kilwinning– Irvine boundary	30.7	49.4	B7080 – Stanecastle	Junction; southbound exit and northbound entrance
North Ayrshire	Irvine	33.5– 34.1	53.9– 54.9	A71 to A77(M) – Irvine, Kilmarnock, Glasgow, Crosshouse, Harbourside	Junction
North Ayrshire	Irvine– Dreghorn boundary	34.5– 35.0	55.5– 56.3	A737 / B7080 to A736 – Irvine, Meadowhead, Riverside, Harbourside, Gailes, Shewalton	Junction; Gailes and Shewalton signed southbound only, B7080 and To A736 northbound only
South Ayrshire	Loans– Troon boundary	36.7	59.1	A759 to B746 – Barassie, Dundonald, Kilmarnock	Junction; northbound exit and southbound entrance
South Ayrshire	Loans boundary	38.3– 39.0	61.6– 62.8	B746 to A759 – Loans, Troon	Junction
South Ayrshire	Monkton	39.8	64.1	A79 south / Main Street to B749 – Prestwick, Troon, Monkton	Northern terminus of A79
South Ayrshire	Monkton	40.5	65.2	A77 / Kilmarnock Road to M77 – Glasgow, Kilmarnock, Stranraer, Ayr, Monkton	Southern terminus
1.000 mi = 1.609 km; 1.000 km = 0.621 mi: Closed/former; Incomplete access
