= B717 (disambiguation) =

B717 may refer to:

- The Boeing 717 airliner
- The B717 road in Scotland
