= A78 =

A78 or A-78 may refer to:

- A78 road (Scotland)
- Benoni Defense, in the Encyclopaedia of Chess Openings
- ARM Cortex-A78
