= B744 =

B744 may refer to:

- The Boeing 747-400 airliner, whose ICAO type designator is B744
- The B744 road in Ayrshire, Scotland
