= Plantation, Glasgow =

Coordinates: 55.854701°N 4.284174°W

Plantation
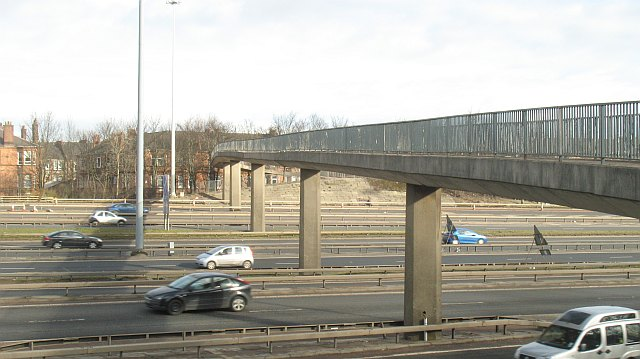
- Footbridge, Plantation Crossing 16 lanes of the M8 and M77, 2010

- Location within Glasgow
- OS grid reference: NS570647
- Council area: Glasgow City Council
- Lieutenancy area: Glasgow
- Country: Scotland
- Sovereign state: United Kingdom
- Post town: GLASGOW
- Postcode district: G51 1
- Dialling code: 0141
- Police: Scotland
- Fire: Scottish
- Ambulance: Scottish
- UK Parliament: Glasgow South West
- Scottish Parliament: Glasgow Govan; Glasgow

Plantation is an area in the city of Glasgow, Scotland. It is situated south of the River Clyde and is part of the former Burgh of Govan. It lies approximately between the areas of Cessnock and Ibrox to the west, Kingston to the east, and Kinning Park to the south.

The 32-hectare (80-acre) Craigiehall estate, previously three smaller properties, was bought in 1783 by John Robertson, a cashier in the Glasgow Arms Bank, who with his brothers owned cotton and sugar plantations in the West Indies. He renamed it Plantation, possibly as a reminder of the West Indies plantations. It then, in 1793, passed to John Mair (d. 1867), a merchant who developed the building and gardens. Plantation passed to the Maclean family, The Macleans of Plantation, in 1829, in the person of William Maclean (1783–1867), a Glasgow Baillie.

In the years that followed, the estate was bisected by the railway to the south, with the shipbuilding yards of The Clyde Trust cutting off the estate from the river. Tenement housing was built and the house demolished in about 1900.

Plantation Quay formed part of the site for the Glasgow Garden Festival in 1988 and subsequent Glasgow Science Centre.

Before demolition of the 19th century tenements in the 1970s, Plantation's streets included Lorne Street, MacLean Street, Blackburn Street, Plantation Street, Eaglesham Street, Mair Street, Craigiehall Street and Rutland Crescent; parts of Paisley Road West and Govan Road are also part of the district. The main primary school is Lorne Street Primary School. Other points of interest are the local Church of Scotland and Harper Memorial Baptist Church, named for John Harper the first pastor, who died in the Titanic disaster.

Today, Plantation is where all the major roads join around the Tradeston area and where the M8 meets the junction of the M77 and the M74.
