= M898 motorway =

Motorway in Renfrewshire, Scotland

M898
- M898 highlighted in blue

Route information
- Length: 1 mi (1.6 km)
- Existed: 1975–present

Major junctions
- Southwest end: Erskine
- M8 motorway
- Northeast end: Erskine near Erskine Bridge

Location
- Country: United Kingdom
- Primary destinations: Erskine Bridge, Greenock, Glasgow Airport, Paisley

Road network
- Roads in the United Kingdom; Motorways; A and B road zones

The M898 motorway is a 1-mile-long (1.6 km) motorway in Renfrewshire, Scotland. It is a spur route from the M8 motorway towards the Erskine Bridge. It lacks hard shoulders along its length. Its northern terminus comes at the junction with the A726 road, the former location of the toll booths for the Erskine Bridge, which were removed on 1 April 2006.

== Junctions ==
M898 motorway junctions
County	Location	mi	km	Junction	Destinations	Notes
Renfrewshire	Erskine	0	0	— (Note: 55.900°N 4.484°W)	M8 - Glasgow, Glasgow Airport, Greenock	
Renfrewshire	Erskine	1.0	1.6	1 (Note: 55.909°N 4.472°W)	A898 - Erskine Bridge A726 - Erskine, Inchinnan	End of motorway; continues as A898
1.000 mi = 1.609 km; 1.000 km = 0.621 mi

Coordinate list
