= A727 road =

Road in Scotland

Coordinates: 55.79562°N 4.29246°W

A727

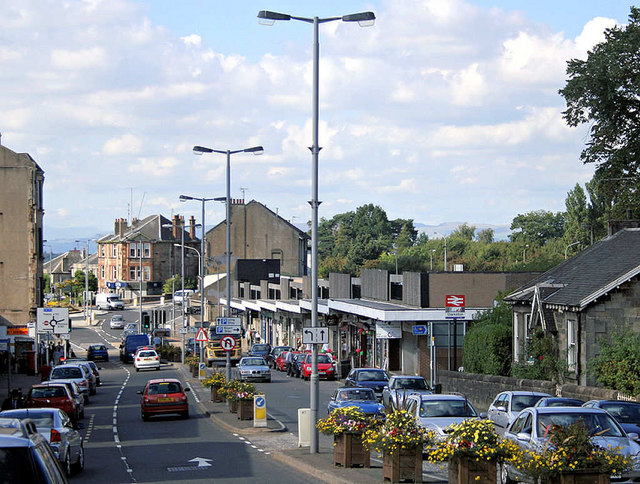
- A727 (Busby Road) passing through Clarkston Town Centre

Route information
- Length: 5.1 mi (8.2 km)

Major junctions
- Southeast end: Philipshill, East Kilbride
- Northwest end: Darnley

Location
- Country: United Kingdom
- Constituent country: Scotland

Road network
- Roads in the United Kingdom; Motorways; A and B road zones
← A726	→ A728

The A727 road in Scotland runs from East Kilbride in South Lanarkshire, through East Renfrewshire, to Junction 3 of the M77 motorway in Glasgow.

== History ==
Until the 1980s, the A727 number applied to what is now partially the B767, north of Clarkston. This road continued all the way to the Gorbals in Glasgow. In 2006, following the opening of the Glasgow Southern Orbital route as part of the A726, the A727 number was recreated and took over the suburban part of what was formerly numbered as the A726, connecting two separate parts that remained under the A726 designation in addition to the Southern Orbital.

== Route ==
The road's designation as the A727 starts in East Kilbride in South Lanarkshire continuing straight from part of the A726, otherwise known as the 'Queensway', which is the primary east–west dual carriageway through the town (the A726 begins 6.2 miles (10.0 km) south-east at Strathaven). The A727 starts at the Philipshill Roundabout at Peel Park, on an overpass; the other exits on the roundabout are another section of the A726 continuing on Redwood Drive to the south – one end of the mid-2000s Glasgow Southern Orbital route bypassing the towns of East Renfrewshire – and Stewartfield Way to the north (as of 2020, a proposal was in place to upgrade this to a dual carriageway for better links to the A749 on the northern side of the town).

Also referred to South Road at this point, the road then goes west across fields towards Busby. It is named East Kilbride Road as it crosses through the Thorntonhall Roundabout (meeting the B766 from Carmunnock), then enters East Renfrewshire heading into Busby where it becomes a single carriageway road through the conservation area. It meets the B759 before turning sharply, passing under a very low railway bridge at Busby railway station, before crossing the White Cart Water. It is then named Main Street as it passes Busby's shops.

The road then heads into Clarkston town centre as Busby Road, reaching Sheddens Roundabout where it meets the B767, with the road turning north. Here it is briefly a dual carriageway until Clarkston Toll. The route continues past Carolside Gardens before it passes Clarkston railway station and the main shops of Clarkston Town Centre. At the Clarkston Toll roundabout, the B767 restarts northwards on Stamperland Crescent (but is known as Clarkston Road for most of its length) while the A727 continues west as Eastwoodmains Road, passing under two arched bridges at Williamwood railway station, before reaching Eastwood Toll in Giffnock, this large roundabout being the junction with the A77 (Fenwick Road / Ayr Road).

The A727 carries on westwards as Rouken Glen Road with Eastwood Park to the north and then Rouken Glen Park to the south. It becomes a dual carriageway again just prior to Spiersbridge Roundabout where it meets the B769 (Speirsbridge Road which becomes Thornliebank Road). It then enters the Glasgow council area as Nitshill Road, passing the Jenny Lind and Arden neighbourhoods; it passes under Junction 3 of the M77 motorway at Darnley a few hundred yards further west, the A727 designation ends and the road continues as the A726 towards Nitshill and thereafter on to Paisley, Glasgow Airport and eventually Erskine.
