= M8 motorway (Scotland) =

Busiest motorway in Scotland

M8
- M8 highlighted in blue
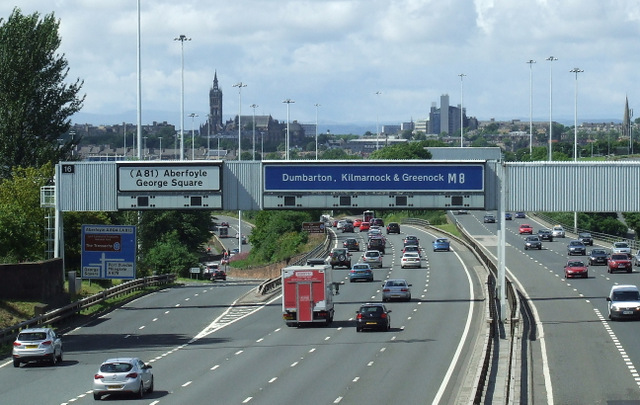
- The M8 motorway looking towards Glasgow's West End

Route information
- Part of E05 and E16
- Maintained by Transport Scotland
- Length: 60.3 mi (97.0 km)
- Existed: 1965–present
- History: Opened: 1965; Completed: 2017

Major junctions
- East end: Sighthill; 55.9244°N 3.3128°W
- J2 → M9 motorway / J8 → M73 motorway/A8(M) motorway J13 → M80 motorway J21 → M74 motorway J22 → M77 motorway J30 → M898 motorway
- West end: Langbank; 55.9234°N 4.5504°W

Location
- Country: United Kingdom
- Constituent country: Scotland
- Counties: Edinburgh, West Lothian, North Lanarkshire, Glasgow, Renfrewshire
- Primary destinations: Edinburgh; Edinburgh Airport; Livingston; Glasgow; Paisley; Glasgow Airport; Greenock

Road network
- Roads in the United Kingdom; Motorways; A and B road zones

The M8 is the busiest motorway in Scotland. It connects the country's two largest cities, Glasgow and Edinburgh, and serves other large communities including Airdrie, Coatbridge, Greenock, Livingston and Paisley. The motorway is 60 miles (97 km) long. A major construction project to build the final section between Newhouse and Baillieston was completed on 30 April 2017. The motorway has one service station, Heart of Scotland Services, previously named Harthill due to its proximity to the village.

== History ==
With the advent of motorway-building in the United Kingdom in the late 1950s, the M8 was planned as one of a core of new motorways, designed to replace the A8 road as a high-capacity alternative for intercity travel. The motorway was constructed piecemeal in several stages bypassing towns, beginning in 1965 with the opening by Minister of State for Scotland George Willis of the bypass of Harthill. In 1968 the Renfrew Bypass was opened as the A8(M), becoming part of the M8 when the motorway to the west was connected. The Glasgow inner city section was constructed between 1968 and 1972, using a scheme outlined in the Bruce Report, which was published as the Second World War was closing, and which set out a series of initiatives to regenerate the city. Bruce's scheme evolved into what would become the Glasgow Inner Ring Road, a motorway "box" which would encircle the city centre, connected to the Renfrew Bypass at its south western corner, and the Monkland Motorway (built over the former route of the Monkland Canal) towards Edinburgh at its north eastern corner. Together, these three sections of motorway make up the present day M8.

Most of the motorway's length was complete by 1980. Since then, there has been a new interchange with the M80 motorway added in 1992, a 4-mile (6.4 km) eastern extension from Newbridge to the then-new Edinburgh City Bypass in 1995, and the new junction on the approach to the Kingston Bridge in Glasgow connecting to the new M74 extension in 2011. As part of the Scottish Government's 'M8 M73 M74 Motorway Improvements programme', on which construction began in early 2015, the remaining unfinished section between Baillieston (J8) and Newhouse (J6) was built, alongside other major improvements enhancing connectivity to the local road network, M73, and M74. The new section was fully opened on 30 April 2017. On 6 December 2019, the Southbar interchange (J29a) was reopened to facilitate new housing in the Bishopton area, having been previously closed during the 1970s.

On 18 February 2026 Transport Scotland launched a Public consultation on the future of the Woodside Viaducts with three options being considered for the stretch of urban motorway: repair, replace, or remove. The consultation closed on 25 March 2026 and may impact the motorway's future in this area.

== Route ==
From the Edinburgh City Bypass, the road runs west to junction with the M9 motorway (for the Forth Road Bridge), bypassing to the north of Livingston and south of Bathgate. It continues across Scotland's Central Belt. The next section – originally designated the Monkland Motorway – begins on the boundary of the Glasgow City council area at the M73 motorway junction (the main interchange for all routes south via the M74 motorway) before passing through the districts of Barlanark, Riddrie, Dennistoun and Townhead (following the route of the abandoned Monkland Canal) on the way directly into the city centre. The central section – the uncompleted Glasgow Inner Ring Road – contains numerous junctions serving local communities including Cowcaddens, Garnethill, Kelvingrove and Anderston. It then crosses the River Clyde on the Kingston Bridge, runs west through Kinning Park, Bellahouston and Hillington before leaving Glasgow. Continuing west, it bypasses Renfrew and Paisley (carrying traffic directly over what was the main runway at Renfrew Airport, closed in 1966) before serving Glasgow International Airport, running to the south of Erskine, and terminating at Langbank, around 10 miles (16 km) east of Greenock.

The M8 nominally comprises sections of the international E-road network, namely E05 (Langbank-Baillieston) and E16 (Baillieston-Edinburgh), although neither is signposted – no such roads are in the United Kingdom.

== Criticism ==
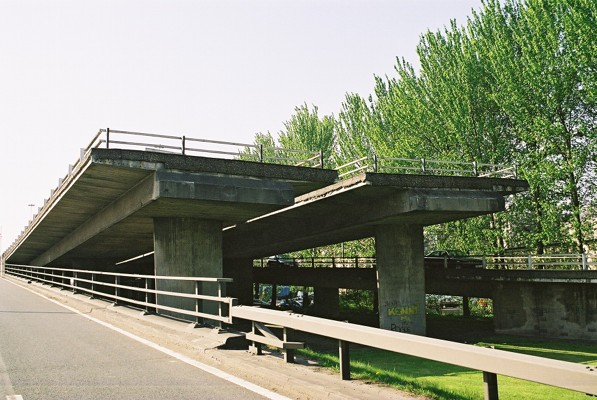
This stub in the Tradeston area, popularly known as the "ski-ramp", is the abandoned interchange for the southern flank of the Glasgow Inner Ring Road

The central Glasgow section of the M8 is unusual amongst UK motorways (and more similar to many US Interstates) in that it directly bisects an urban city centre, whereas most other motorways bypass such centres. This section is mainly elevated on a concrete viaduct, lowering pollution concentrations but exposing some public spaces, roof terraces and other parts of buildings to noise and shading.

Some slip roads in the Glasgow section unusually enter and exit from the overtaking (right-hand) lane.

The motorway includes one of the busiest river crossings in Europe, Glasgow's Kingston Bridge.

Several incomplete structures were built around the motorway – at least 3 have been demolished or reused from the 1960s dubbed Bridges to Nowhere. A few incomplete structures remain.

The cause of most traffic congestion on the urban section is traffic from the M73 and M80 routes onto the eastern section of M8 which within 2 miles (3.2 km) reduces from five lanes to two on the Kingston Bridge approaches. Prior to the construction of the M74 extension, attempts were made to minimise delays on this section; these included restricting exits around the Kingston Bridge, a ramp metering programme, and expanded use of electronic signing above and beside the motorway as part of the CITRAC (Centrally Integrated TRAffic Control) system.

The M8 is also criticised as a barrier to wildlife access (for example the reintroduced beaver) from the north of Scotland to the Southern Uplands.

== Problems solved ==
Successive failed attempts were made to build the southern flank of the Glasgow Inner Ring Road envisaged by the Bruce Report of the late 1940s. The eastern section had been planned to run north–south close to the High Street of Glasgow, through or under Glasgow Green to the south side of the Clyde. Public opinion was strongly against this and the eastern section was shelved, with a much later M74 connecting the far-eastern areas of Glasgow. This section, which is an extension of the M74 was built to a different route, intended to funnel long-distance traffic from the north and south which is bound for the southern Clyde Coast and allow it to bypass the urban section of the M8. Following many years of intensive political discussion and legal battles, the M74 completion began in 2008 and opened in June 2011. Indications are that the new road has been successful in reducing traffic levels on the urban section of the M8.

== Junctions ==
M8 motorway junctions
Eastbound exits	Junction	Westbound exits
M8 now terminates A720 Edinburgh City Bypass, Berwick upon Tweed (A1), Edinburgh City Centre (A71)	J1 (Hermiston Gait)	Start of motorway
M9 Stirling, Edinburgh Airport (A8), Queensferry Crossing (M90)	J2 (Newbridge)	M9 Stirling, Queensferry Crossing (M90)
A899 Livingston	J3 (Livingston)	A899 Livingston
A779 Livingston (West). (A89) Bathgate, Broxburn	J3a (Bathgate)	A779 Livingston (West). (A89) Bathgate, Broxburn
A801 Bathgate, Whitburn, Falkirk	J4 (Whitburn)	A801 Bathgate, Whitburn, Falkirk
Whitburn, Heartlands (B7066)	J4a (Heartlands)	Whitburn, Heartlands (B7066)
Harthill services
B7057 Harthill, Shotts (B7066)	J5 (Harthill)	B7057 Harthill, Shotts (B7066)
No access	J6 (Newhouse)	A8 Eurocentral, Coatbridge. A73 Motherwell, Airdrie
A8 (A73) Lanark, Wishaw, Motherwell, Airdrie	J6a (Chapelhall)	No access
Eurocentral	J7 (Eurocentral)	No access
No access	J7a (Shawhead)	A725 Carlisle (M74), East Kilbride, Bellshill
M73 (M74) Carlisle. A8 Coatbridge	J8 (Ballieston)	M73 (M74) Carlisle, Glasgow (South), Glasgow Airport. M73 (M80) Stirling, Kincardine Bridge
Baillieston, Springhill	J9 (Easterhouse)	No access
Easterhouse, Barlanark	J10 (Bartiebeith)	Springhill, Easterhouse, Baillieston
B765 Garthamlock, Queenslie	J11 (Stepps)	B765 Stepps, Queenslie
A80 Riddrie, Stepps	J12 (Riddrie)	A80 Riddrie, Stepps
M80 Stirling, Kincardine Bridge	J13 (Provan)	Blochairn, Parkhead
B763 Blochairn, Dennistoun	J14 (Fruit Market)	No access
Glasgow Cathedral, Glasgow Cross (Lane 4 filter)	J15 (Townhead)	Glasgow Cathedral, Glasgow Cross (Lanes 1 & 2 filter)
A803 Springburn (Exit from Lane 1)	J15 (Townhead)	A803 Springburn (Exit from Lane 3)
No access	J16 (Craighall)	Aberfoyle (A81), George Square
A82 Dumbarton, Aberfoyle (A81)	J17 (Great Western Road)	A82 Dumbarton
Anderston, Charing Cross (Access from J20 on-ramp only)	J18 (Charing Cross)	Kelvingrove, Charing Cross
Glasgow City Centre (Mandatory Low Emission Zone)	J18 (Charing Cross)	Kelvingrove, Charing Cross
A814 Clydebank, S.E.C.C. (Access from J20 on-ramp only)	J19 (Anderston)	A814 Clydebank, S.E.C.C.
No access	J20 (Kingston Bridge)	Tradeston, East Kilbride (A730), Carlisle (M74)
Kinning Park, Kilmarnock (M77) (Exit from Spur Lane 1)	J21 (Seaward Street) Access for all EB J21 routes splits from main carriageway immediately following J23 (Lane 1 filters + Lane 2 Exit)	No access
A8 Tradeston (Spur Lanes 1 & 2 filter)	J21 (Seaward Street) Access for all EB J21 routes splits from main carriageway immediately following J23 (Lane 1 filters + Lane 2 Exit)	No access
M74 Carlisle (Spur Lanes 3 & 4 filter)	J21 (Seaward Street) Access for all EB J21 routes splits from main carriageway immediately following J23 (Lane 1 filters + Lane 2 Exit)	No access
No access	J22 (Plantation)	M77 Kilmarnock, Prestwick Airport
No access	J23 (Dumbreck Road)	B768 Ibrox (Access from J21 on-ramps & M74 only)
Govan, Ibrox	J24 (Helen Street)	Govan
A739 Clyde Tunnel	J25 (Cardonald)	A739 Clyde Tunnel
No access	J25a (Braehead)	Braehead
A736 Hillington, Braehead	J26 (Hillington)	A736 Hillington, Renfrew (A8)
A741 Paisley, Renfrew	J27 (Arkleston)	A741 Paisley, Renfrew
No access	J28 (Glasgow Airport)	Glasgow Airport
No access	J28a	A737 Irvine
Glasgow Airport, A726 Paisley, A737 Irvine	J29 (St James)	A726 Paisley
No access	J29a	A8 Bishopton
M898 Erskine, Erskine Bridge	J30 (Erskine)	M898 Erskine, Erskine Bridge
Start of motorway	J31 (West Ferry)	A8 Bishopton
A8 Bishopton; Non-motorway traffic	J31 (West Ferry)	Road becomes A8 towards Greenock
No Access; Limited Access; Low Emission Zone; Multiple Independent Exits

== Gallery ==
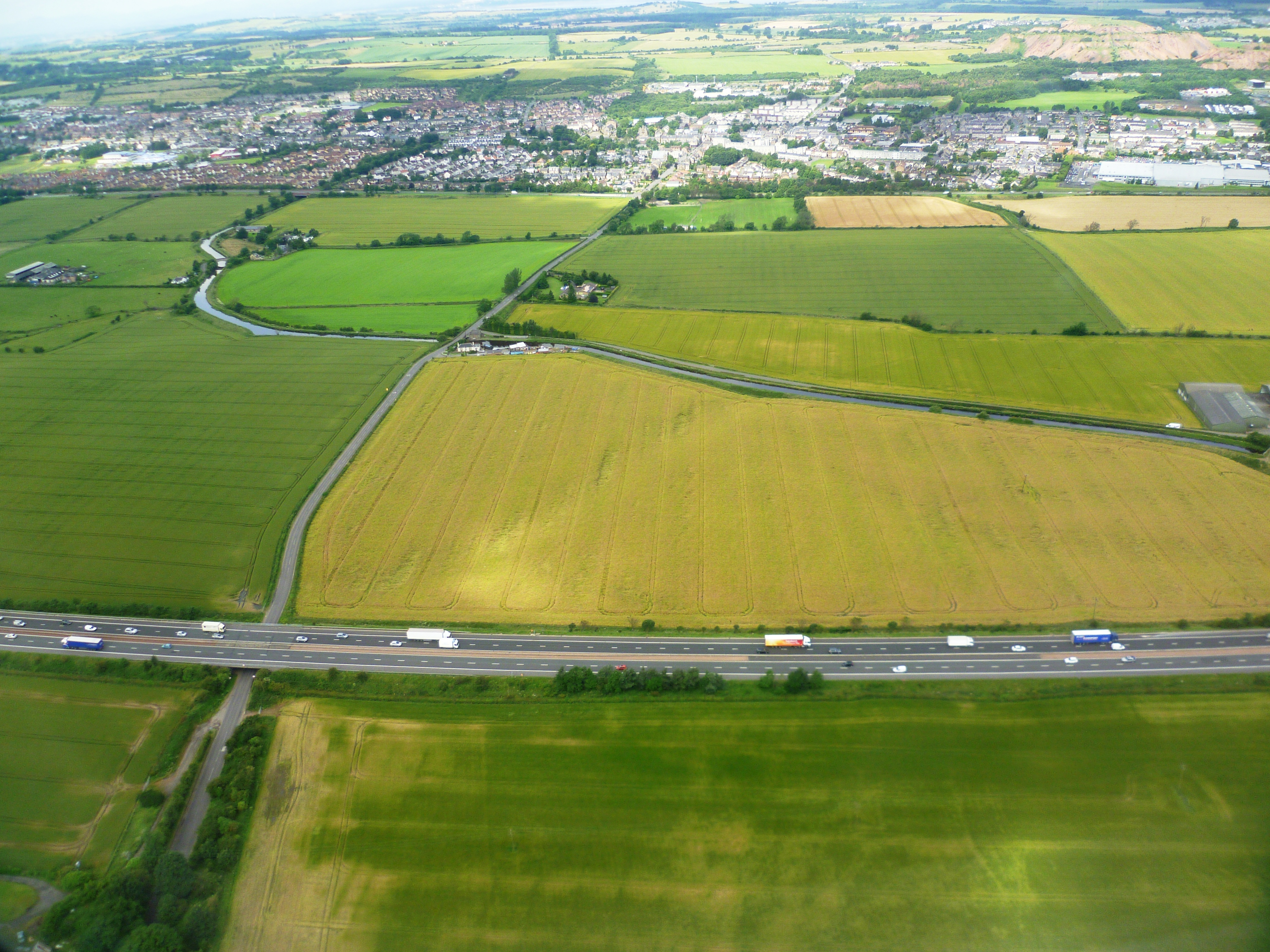
The M8 south of Broxburn, West Lothian

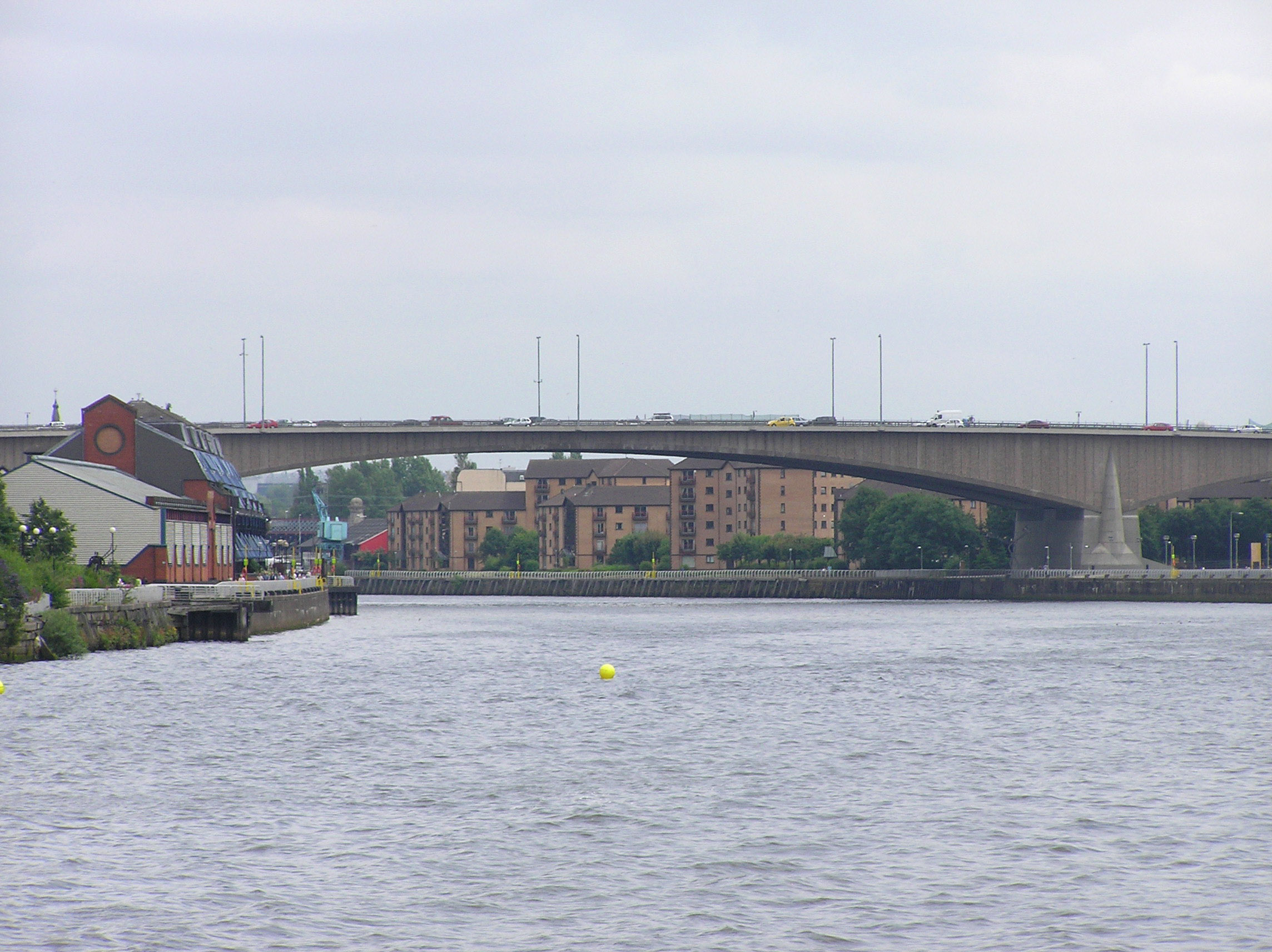
Kingston Bridge

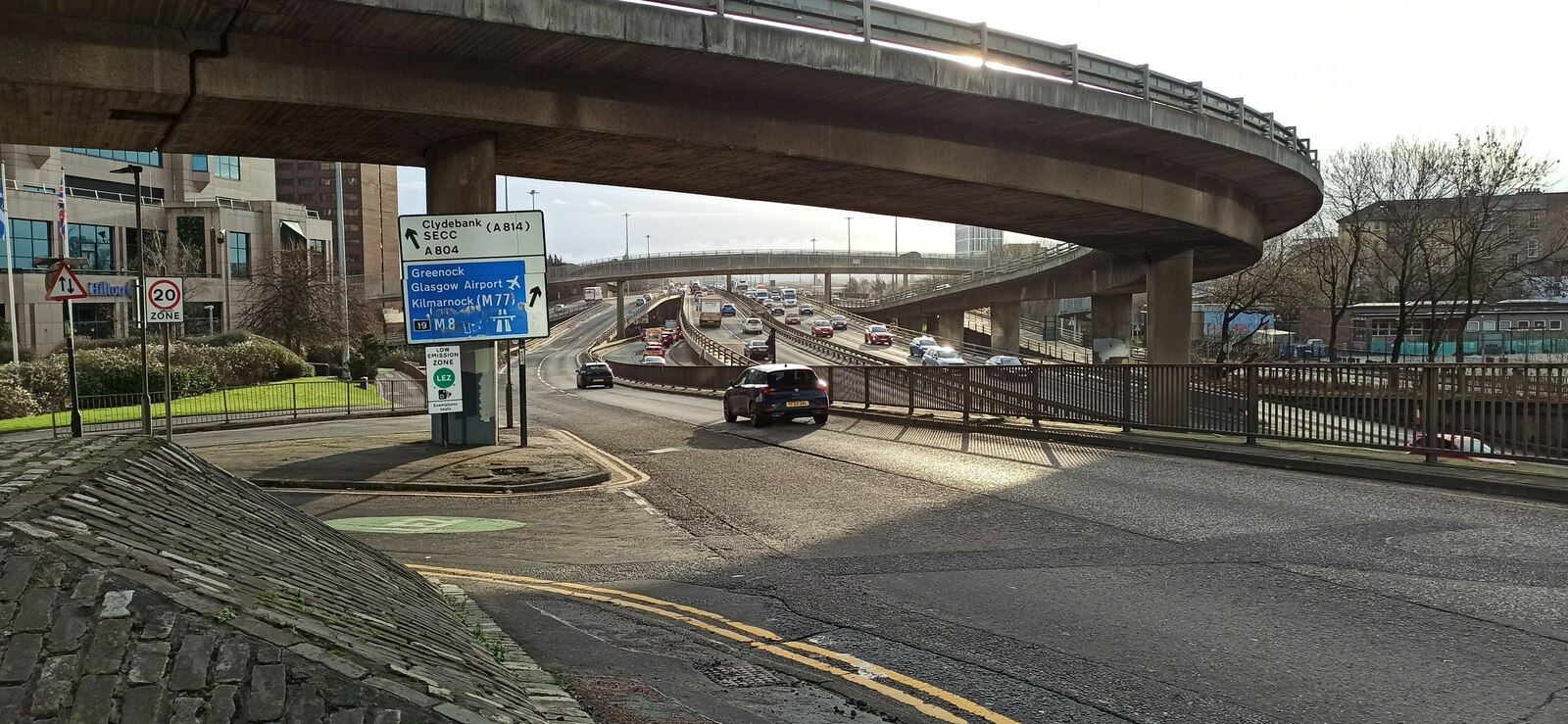
The M8 motorway at Anderston

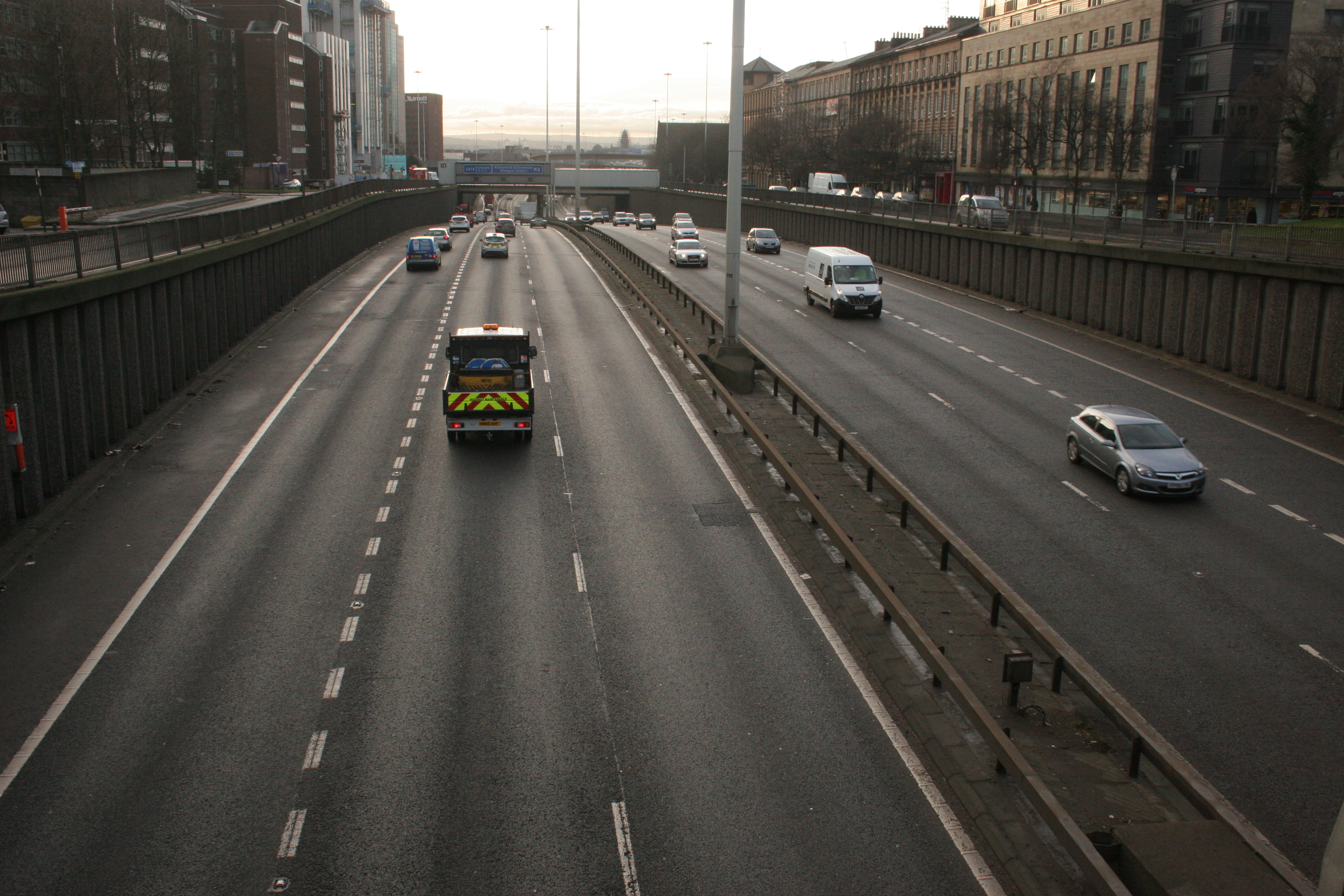
M8 motorway at Charing Cross

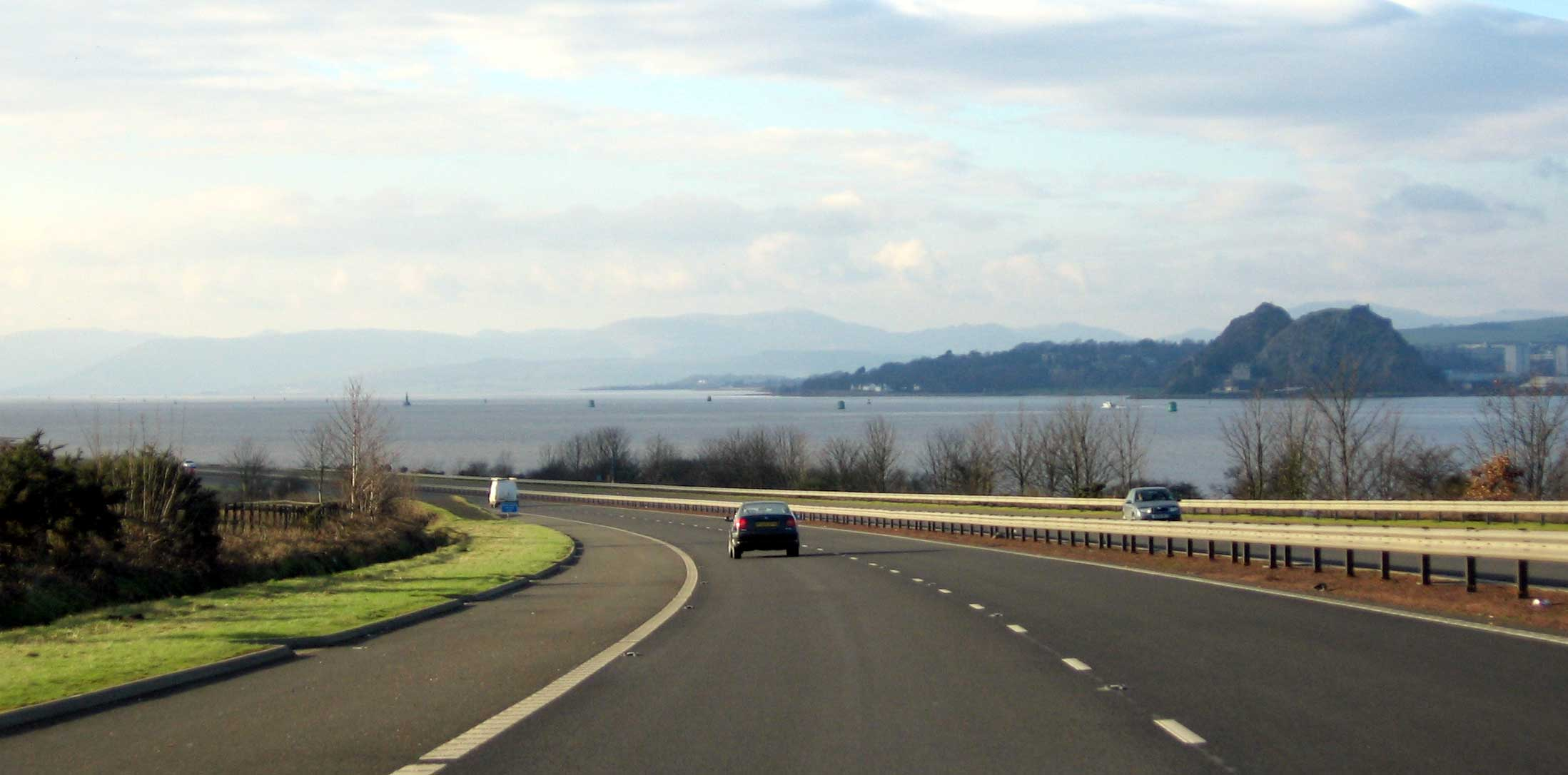
M8 nearing the west terminus of the motorway at Langbank, with views over the Clyde

M8 route in relation to UK motorway network

== See also ==
- List of motorways in the United Kingdom
