= Greenhillstairs =

Coordinates: 55.365°N 3.497°W

Greenhillstairs is the steep B719 road north of Moffat in Dumfries and Galloway, Scotland. The road, about 3 miles long, leaves the A701 Moffat to Edinburgh main road passes over the A74(M) and then joins the B7076 service road running parallel to the motorway. The B719 descends steeply into the Evan Water valley with views across the valley.
