= Aird, Dumfries and Galloway =

Coordinates: 54°53′56″N 4°58′18″W

Aird (Gaelic:An Àird) is a village in Dumfries and Galloway, in the southwest of Scotland. It is 2.5 miles (4.0 km) east of Stranraer and 1 mile (1.6 km) west of Castle Kennedy.
