= Clyde Tunnel =

Crossing beneath the River Clyde in Scotland

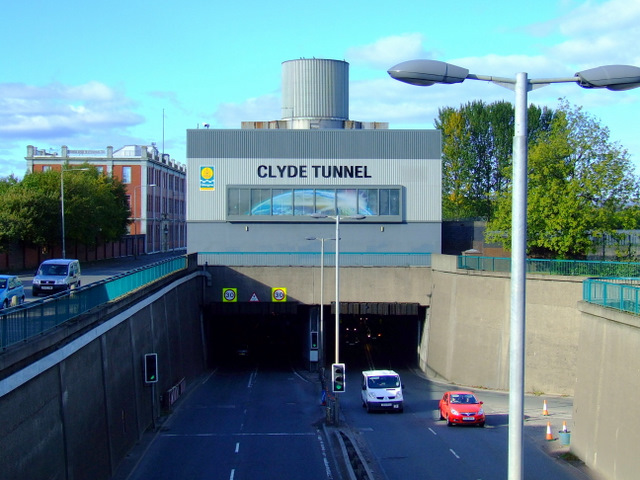
- The south portal of the Clyde Tunnel at Linthouse
- Interactive map of Clyde Tunnel

Overview
- Official name: Clyde Tunnel
- Location: River Clyde, Linthouse and Whiteinch in Glasgow
- Coordinates: 55.86867°N 4.33115°W
- Route: part of A739

Operation
- Opened: 3 July 1963
- Operator: Glasgow City Council
- Traffic: 65,000
- Toll: Free

Technical
- Design engineer: Sir Alan Muir Wood of Halcrow
- Length: 762 m (2,500 ft) (northbound and southbound)
- No. of lanes: 4
- Tunnel clearance: 17 ft 6 in (5.3 m)

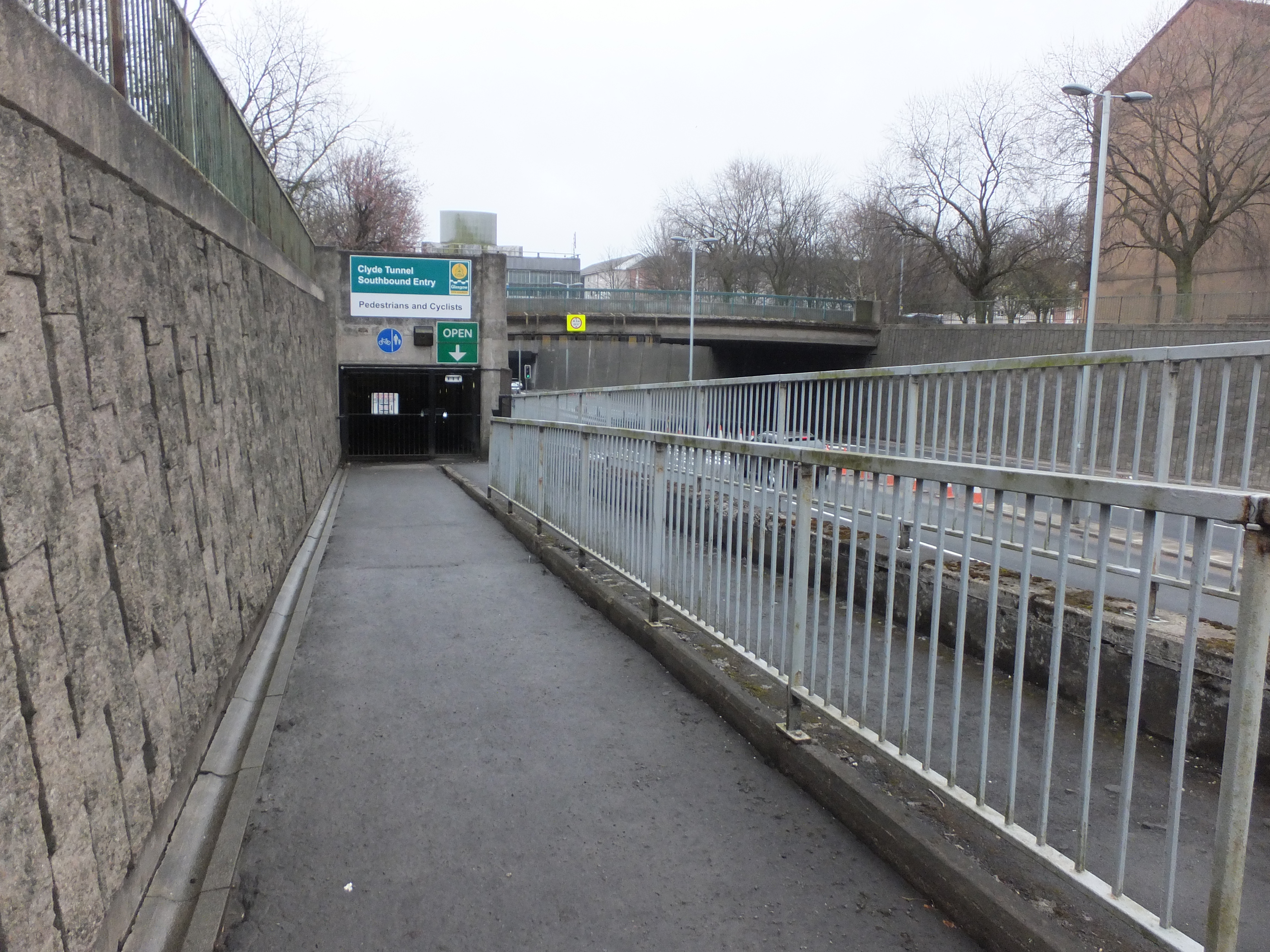
North entrance to one of the cyclist and pedestrian tunnels (east)

The Clyde Tunnel is a crossing beneath the River Clyde in Glasgow, Scotland for road traffic, cyclists and pedestrians. Two parallel tunnel tubes connect the districts of Whiteinch to the north and Govan to the south in the west of the city.

== History ==
Efforts to improve the transport infrastructure of Glasgow post-World War II were hit by the problem of crossing the Clyde. Downstream of Jamaica Street in the city centre, it was perceived to be impossible to build a bridge due to the prevalence of shipping. The solution — to build a tunnel beneath the river — was not a new one, with the Harbour Tunnel at Finnieston having been built in the 1890s. However, the Clyde Tunnel project was to be built in the boom of the car era and would be a much larger project. It was given the green light in 1948 but financial difficulties prevented work from beginning until 1957.

== Construction ==
Construction began in 1957, with tunnelling shields, based on Marc Isambard Brunel's design used for the Thames Tunnel a century earlier, used to dig the two tunnels. The tunnels were cut perfectly circular with the road deck sitting a third of the way up. Under each road deck is the pedestrian/cycle tunnel and ventilation ducts. 16 miners operated the shield working shifts in a compressed air environment to ensure that the rock and the river above did not collapse into the tunneling area. The digging itself would be done only with great difficulty due to the geology of the area, hard rock sitting under a soft silt layer beneath the river.

The techniques for decompression after a period of working in a high pressure atmosphere had not been perfected at this time and – also owing to the prevalence of workers refusing to go through the decompression sequence given the length of time required (around an hour) – there were a number of cases of decompression sickness diagnosed as a result, resulting in two fatalities. Work on the tunnel was halted for a time after an explosion when compressed air escaped through the tunnel lining into the river, flushing outward in a fountain.

The first completed tunnel tube, for northbound traffic, was eventually opened by Elizabeth II on 3 July 1963, with the southbound tunnel opening in March 1964. The total cost of the project was £10 million (equivalent to £209,450,000 in 2025). By this time, the migration of port facilities downstream to the deeper waters of the Firth of Clyde and improvements in engineering technology had allowed the consideration of bridges downstream of the city centre, namely the Kingston Bridge and, much further downstream than the Tunnel, the Erskine Bridge.

== The tunnels ==
The road tunnels are each 762 metres (2,500 feet) long with a gradient approaching 6% or 1:16. The width of the river at this point is 123 metres (404 ft). Each road tunnel carries two lanes of traffic as part of the A739 road, and are completely separate except for a very small crossover passage between the road tunnels at the nadir (barely large enough for a single pedestrian). They are monitored and controlled from the two Portal towers, one at each end of the tunnel, where CCTV monitors the entirety of the tunnel. Beneath the road tunnel decks run foot and cycle tunnels; and below those, the tunnels' services.

=== Pedestrian and cycle tunnels ===
Both tunnels are open to pedestrians in both directions. The eastern tunnel is open to cyclists going southbound, and the western tunnel to cyclists going northbound. In 2008, CCTV secure entry systems were installed at the portals of these tunnels in order to reduce crime and anti-social behaviour in the tunnels.

== Repair work ==
The estimate for traffic levels in the tunnel was between 9,000 and 13,000 vehicles per day during construction; on the first day of opening, 22,000 vehicles used the tunnel. Current estimates for traffic levels are around 65,000 vehicles per day. These unanticipated high volumes of traffic have increased the wear rate for the tunnel, causing it to close repeatedly for repair and renovation work, which has disrupted traffic in the area for over a decade, and has arguably led to the increase in traffic causing similar problems on the Kingston Bridge.

The more recent repairs, costing as much as the initial outlay for construction, involved installing a second, modern, fireproof layer, enabling the tunnel to meet European safety standards after St Gotthard and Mont Blanc tunnel fires, along with new air extraction systems and new lighting. Work began in March 2005 and was scheduled to last until at least April 2006, with one of the tunnels closed during off-peak hours (19:00 to 07:00 daily). However, problems that were encountered meant the work was only completed in 2010.

The roadworks coincided with the "Hold Your Breath" project which aimed to add an artistic experience to travel through the tunnel. The pedestrian tunnel also had its years of graffiti removed as part of a beautification project, but it was often redone soon after being removed.

== Breath holding ==
A popular game amongst local children, and some adults, is attempting to hold one's breath for the duration of the journey by motorized vehicle through the Clyde Tunnel. This is possible due to the short length of the tunnel – a car travelling at the 30 mph (50 km/h) limit takes 57 seconds to pass through. Success is hampered by snarl-ups (particularly at the interchange on the north end) slowing traffic. The breath-holding game was the subject of Scottish artist Roderick Buchanan's video Gobstopper, for which he won the Beck's Futures art prize in 2000.
