= Philipshill =

Area of East Kilbride, Scotland

Coordinates: 55°46′26″N 4°13′45″W

Philipshill is an area of East Kilbride in South Lanarkshire, Scotland, roughly two miles (3.2 km) west of the East Kilbride Shopping Centre on the A726.

The name now mostly applies to a small traditional hamlet close to the NMS museum of country life, as well as a nearby hotel and set of office buildings on the edge of the Peel Park campus. Philipshill was originally a much larger territorial unit within the old Lordship of East Kilbride. Its borders included the estate of Hairmyres to the south which was distinguished as Over Philipshill. The modern focus of the area of Philipshill comprises the portion once called Nether Philipshill. The name is widely believed to derive from the Anglo-Norman High Chamberlain of Scotland in the late twelfth century - Philip de Valognes, with dating and place-name analysis in support of this as a probable conclusion The lands originally focused on a mill called Philipshill Mill, and possibly a strategic royal castle on a linked side of the Kittoch Water - a small river flowing through the said lands.

The area features Queensway House, also known as the Centre One Tax Office (H.M. Revenue and Customs - Inland Revenue). This is a record office and call centre built as a replacement of the former building of the same name and function the once existed at East Kilbride town centre.

There was also once a garden centre in Philipshill hamlet.

In 1989, a cemetery opened on Westerfield Road, known as Philipshill Cemetery.
