= A736 road =

Road in Scotland

A736

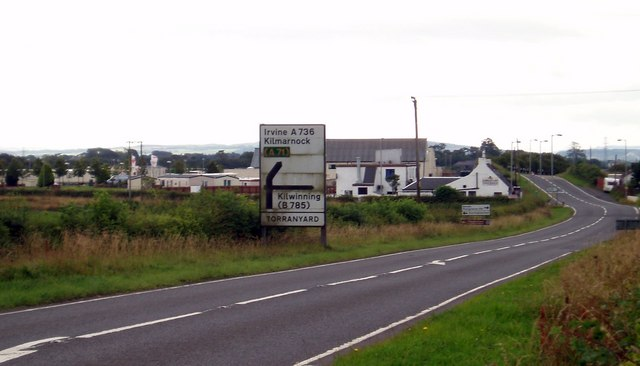
- A736 at Torranyard

Route information
- Length: 12 mi (19 km)

Major junctions
- North end: A8 at Renfrew
- South end: A737 at Irvine

Location
- Country: United Kingdom
- Constituent country: Scotland

Road network
- Roads in the United Kingdom; Motorways; A and B road zones
← A735	→ A737

The A736 road in Scotland runs between Renfrew and Irvine.

== Route ==
The route begins at the A8 in Renfrew, near Braehead. It heads south through the Crookston area of Glasgow and the Hurlet junction with the A726, before heading south into East Renfrewshire. It enters Barrhead where it passes through the town centre before leaving to the southwest. It passes through the Levern Valley, by the large Crofthead Mill and villages of Neilston and Uplawmoor. The road enters East Ayrshire, passing Lugton and the A735 to Kilmarnock before passing into North Ayrshire. It passes through the small settlements of Burnhouse, Auchentiber and Torranyard. It arrives in northern Irvine, passing through the large Stanecastle Roundabout, coming into the town centre of Irvine before meeting the A737 at a large T-junction.
