= M77 motorway =

Motorway in Scotland

M77
- M77 highlighted in blue
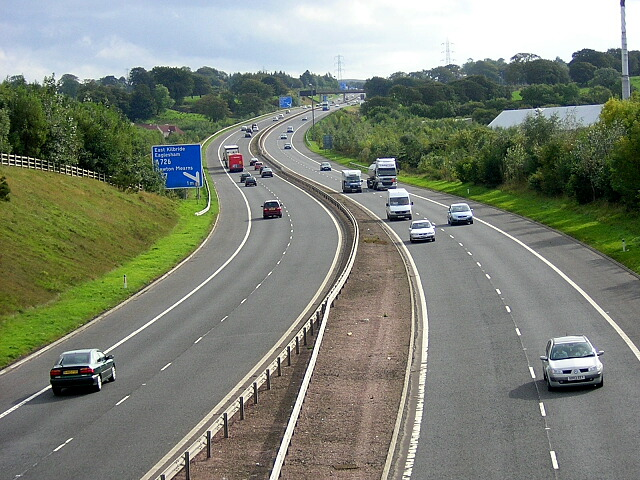
- M77 west of Newton Mearns, with the since demolished Netherplace Dye Works on the right.

Route information
- Length: 20.0 mi (32.2 km)
- Existed: 1977–present
- History: Constructed 1977–2005

Major junctions
- Northeast end: Glasgow; Kinning Park (55.845°N 4.297°W)
- M8 motorway
- Southwest end: Fenwick

Location
- Country: United Kingdom
- Constituent country: Scotland
- Primary destinations: Glasgow, Kilmarnock, Ayr; South-west Scotland

Road network
- Roads in the United Kingdom; Motorways; A and B road zones

The M77 motorway is a motorway in Scotland. It begins in Glasgow at the M8 motorway at Kinning Park, and terminates near Kilmarnock at Fenwick, becoming the A77 dual carriageway. Changes were made in 2005 segregating a lane on the M8 motorway almost as far as the Kingston Bridge, which in January 2006 was extended further onto the bridge itself. It forms the most northerly part of the A77 trunk road which links Glasgow to Stranraer in the South West of Scotland. (The A77 itself continues to Portpatrick in Dumfries and Galloway.)

== History ==
The original M77 was a short 1.5-mile (2.4 km) spur route which took traffic from the M8 motorway in the Kinning Park area of Glasgow, ending at a roundabout on Dumbreck Road close to Bellahouston Park, although prior to this there had been an unused spur running to roughly Ibrox telephone exchange on Gower Street.

A large number of accidents and pollution problems caused in the suburban East Renfrewshire towns of Giffnock and Newton Mearns by commuter traffic and heavy lorries (the A77 is the main route for ferry-bound traffic sailing to Northern Ireland), saw an extension proposed to bypass these areas in the early 1990s. This was fiercely opposed by environmentalists, who set up a road protest camp, as the extension would cut through parts of the historic Pollok Country Park. Approval for the extension was granted and construction went ahead in 1994, opening in December 1996. A threatening visit took place in 1995 to the protesters of 'Pollok Free State' by the Conservative member of parliament Allan Stewart (MP for Eastwood, which had the same boundary as East Renfrewshire), accompanied by his son and another teenager wielding airguns. Stewart was fined for a breach of the peace. The controversy contributed to him standing down as MP for Eastwood in the next election in 1997, where the Conservatives lost the seat to Labour.

The latest upgrade was instigated in 2003, and involved extending the M77 a further 9 miles (14 km) south to the village of Fenwick, near Kilmarnock. This replaced the dangerous 4-lane single carriageway of the A77 that dropped to a two lane single carriageway for the bend just north of the very sharp Mearns Road turn-off, and the A77/B764 (Eaglesham) junction (causing vehicles to queue dangerously on the outside lane on a bend to enter the B764 from the south) which were prone to fatal accidents. The scheme also included the Glasgow Southern Orbital (GSO) which bypassed the narrow B764 Eaglesham Moor Road and the town of Clarkston, East Renfrewshire for routes to East Kilbride. This also resulted in the closure of junction 5 on its previous site at Malletsheugh and the creation of a new junction 5 slightly further south at Maidenhill. An old slip road still exists, but is closed. The works were completed in April 2005.

In 2006, junction 2 was rebuilt in conjunction with the building of the adjacent Silverburn Shopping Centre. The northbound off-ramp and southbound on-ramp are now routed via the access roundabout to the shopping centre.

In 2010 a relief lane was constructed between Plantation and Junction 1 southbound. The purpose of this was to ease the congestion that regularly occurs during peak rush hour.

The original segment of the A77 between Newton Mearns and Fenwick that previously carried the traffic now accommodated by the M77 has been converted into a two-lane single carriageway with cycle lanes. The remainder of the road through Newton Mearns has been converted into a two-lane dual carriageway with cycle lanes. The cycle lanes end at Eastwood Toll in Giffnock.

== Junctions ==
M77 motorway junctions
Council area	Location	mi	km	Junction	Destinations	Notes
Glasgow	Glasgow	0	0	— (Note: 55.850°N 4.294°W)	M8 - Glasgow, Edinburgh	no Westbound exit or Southbound entrance from West
Glasgow	Glasgow	1.1	1.7	1 (Note: 55.840°N 4.308°W)	B768 - Dumbreck, Mosspark	
Glasgow	Glasgow	2.8	4.5	2 (Note: 55.905°N 4.337°W)	B762 - Shawlands, Hurlet	
Glasgow	Glasgow	4.2	6.7	3 (Note: 55.804°N 4.336°W)	A726 - Paisley, Hurlet A727 - Thornliebank, Giffnock	
East Renfrewshire	Newton Mearns	5.8	9.3	4 (Note: 55.784°N 4.350°W)	B7087 - Crookfur (Newton Mearns)	no Southbound entrance or Northbound exit
East Renfrewshire	Newton Mearns	7.7	12.4	5 (Note: 55.757°N 4.354°W)	A726 - East Kilbride, Strathaven; A77 - Newton Mearns, Giffnock, Glasgow	
East Ayrshire	—	12.8	20.6	6 (Note: 55.692°N 4.401°W)	A77 - Kilmarnock, Newton Mearns, Glasgow	no Southbound entrance or Northbound exit
East Ayrshire	—	15.2	24.5	7 (Note: 55.662°N 4.446°W)	A77 - Kilmarnock, Newton Mearns, Glasgow; B778 - Stewarton, Fenwick	no Northbound exit
East Ayrshire	—	16.3	26.3	8 (Note: 55.652°N 4.450°W)	A77 - Ayr, Stranraer; B7038 - Kilmarnock; B7061 - Fenwick	End of Motorway; continues as A77. (Fenwick NB & Kilmarnock SB exits are from A77 side. No additional entrances to M77 or A77.)
1.000 mi = 1.609 km; 1.000 km = 0.621 mi: Concurrency terminus; Incomplete access

Coordinate list

== See also ==
- List of motorways in the United Kingdom
