= List of roads zones in Great Britain =

The numbering zones for roads in Great Britain

== A roads ==
A roads are numbered routes in Great Britain. See the article Great Britain road numbering scheme for the rationale behind the numbers allocated.

Depending on the first digit of the road's number see:

- Zone 1 (road beginning with 1)
- Zone 2 (road beginning with 2)
- Zone 3 (road beginning with 3)
- Zone 4 (road beginning with 4)
- Zone 5 (road beginning with 5)
- Zone 6 (road beginning with 6)
- Zone 7 (road beginning with 7)
- Zone 8 (road beginning with 8)
- Zone 9 (road beginning with 9)

== B roads ==
B roads are numbered routes in Great Britain of lesser importance than A roads. See the article Great Britain road numbering scheme for the rationale behind the numbers allocated.

Depending on the first digit of the road's number see:

- Zone 1
- Zone 2
- Zone 3
- Zone 4
- Zone 5
- Zone 6
- Zone 7
- Zone 8
- Zone 9
