= A71 road =

Road in Scotland

A71

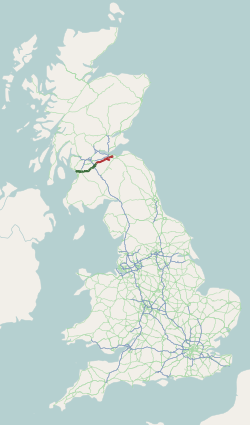

Route information
- Length: 67.7 mi (109.0 km)

Major junctions
- East end: A70 in Edinburgh; 55.9392°N 3.2265°W
- A720 in Edinburgh; A73 in Newmains; M74 near Larkhall; M77 / A76 / A77 / A735 near Kilmarnock; A78 in Irvine

- West end: A737 in Irvine; 55.6070°N 4.6662°W

Location
- Country: United Kingdom
- Constituent country: Scotland
- Council areas: Edinburgh, West Lothian, North Lanarkshire, South Lanarkshire, East Ayrshire, North Ayrshire
- Primary destinations: Edinburgh, Livingston, Strathaven, Kilmarnock

Road network
- Roads in the United Kingdom; Motorways; A and B road zones

The A71 is a major road in Scotland linking Edinburgh with Lanarkshire and Ayrshire. It adjoins the Livingston Bypass A899.

It runs south west from Edinburgh for approximately 70 miles, through Saughton, Wilkieston and south of Livingston, Whitburn and Wishaw, then by way of Overtown, Garrion Bridge, Stonehouse, Strathaven, Darvel, Newmilns, Galston, Hurlford and Kilmarnock to Irvine on the North Ayrshire coast.

Formerly a trunk route from the east to the west coast of Scotland it has since been downgraded to a mix of primary and secondary routes. From Edinburgh to Darvel, it is now a secondary route, in a poor state of repair in some places. But, from Darvel to Irvine, it has retained its primary route status.

== Route ==
=== Edinburgh to Newmains ===
The A71 almost parallels the M8 between the A720 (Edinburgh City Bypass) and the junction with the A73 at Newmains. It passes through the village of Wilkieston and onto the Mid Calder bypass, which leads the route to the south of Livingston. The A71 follows a very straight course through Livingston with several grade separated junctions.

=== Newmains to Darvel ===
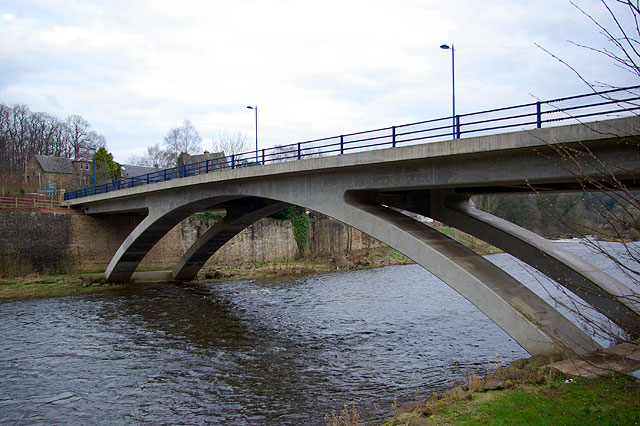
A71 crossing the River Clyde at Garrion Bridge

West of Livingston, the A71 turns sharply south west, bypassing Shotts, Newmains and Wishaw then descends steeply into the Clyde Valley, over Garrion Bridge at the junction with the A72. The A71 climbs steeply up the western side of the Clyde valley on a road which it shares for a very short section with the A72.

When the A71 peaks at the top of the valley, it goes under the M74 at Jct 8 (a junction known locally as Canderside Toll), before turning towards the village of Stonehouse, where a bypass takes traffic to the north of the narrow village roads, before descending into the Avon valley and into Strathaven. This small town, at a meeting of the A71, A723 and A726, provides a link to East Kilbride and Paisley, as well as to Lanark, Hamilton and Motherwell.

=== Darvel to Irvine ===
The A71 then becomes a narrow and winding road across moorland, as the road ascends to the head of the Avon valley. At the highest point is Loudoun Hill, an ancient site of human occupation, and the road here follows the route of a minor Roman road which once linked the Clyde Valley and the coast. The road descends into the Irvine Valley, going through the towns of Darvel and Newmilns, and bypassing Galston and then through Hurlford. At Darvel, the A71 becomes a primary route for the rest of its length to Irvine, and widens slightly, with a straighter alignment until its junction with the A77, south of Kilmarnock. The A71 remains as a dual-carriageway until its terminus in Irvine town centre. A crash barrier runs along the central reservation of the dual-carriageway from the A77 to the boundary with North Ayrshire at Dreghorn.

In mid 2014, the road began to subside between Darvel and Newmilns, with the westbound lane being affected near to the entrance to Gowanbank House. Traffic lights were put in place while a solution was sought, however as of January 2017, a solution has been found and the traffic lights have been lifted.

== Junction list ==
Council area	Location	mi	km	Destinations	Notes
Edinburgh	Edinburgh	0.0	0.0	Dalry Road (A70) / Murieston Road / Henderson Terrace	Eastern terminus; no access from A71 to A70 south or from A70 north to A71
Edinburgh	Edinburgh– Currie boundary	3.4– 3.5	5.5– 5.6	A720 / M8 / M9 / A1 / A8 / A90 – Edinburgh (S, E & N), Berwick upon Tweed, Glasgow, Forth Road Bridge, Stirling, Livingston	Junction on A720
West Lothian	Livingston– Mid Calder boundary	11.7	18.8	A899 north / B8046 (Calder Park Road) to M8 / A89 – Glasgow, Edinburgh, Mid Calder, Bathgate, Broxburn	To A89, Bathgate and Broxburn signed eastbound only; southern terminus of A899
West Lothian	Livingston	12.1	19.5	Dedridge, Murieston	Junction
West Lothian	Livingston	12.3– 12.6	19.8– 20.3	Dedridge, Murieston	Junction
West Lothian	West Calder	16.4	26.4	A704 southwest to A706 – Lanark	Northeastern terminus of A704
West Lothian	West Calder	19.7	31.7	A706 – Lanark, Linlithgow	
North Lanarkshire	Newmains	29.0	46.7	A73 north (Westwood Road) / A722 west (Manse Road) / Bonkle Road to M8 – Airdrie, Wishaw, Bonkle, Edinburgh, Glasgow	To M8, Edinburgh and Glasgow signed eastbound only; eastern terminus of A73 concurrency; eastern terminus of A722
North Lanarkshire	Newmains	29.5	47.5	A73 south (Main Street) to A721 – Peebles, Lanark, Carluke	Western terminus of A73 concurrency
North Lanarkshire	Waterloo	30.7	49.4	A721 (Wishaw Road) to A73 – Lanark, Carluke, Wishaw	
North Lanarkshire– South Lanarkshire boundary	Garrion Bridge	32.8	52.8	A72 east – Lanark	Eastern terminus of A72 concurrency
South Lanarkshire	Garrion Bridge	33.3	53.6	A72 west to M74 north – Hamilton, Glasgow	Western terminus of A72
South Lanarkshire		35.5– 35.7	57.1– 57.5	M74 to A74 – Carlisle, Glasgow	Some access via roundabout with B7078; M74 junction
South Lanarkshire	Strathaven	41.1	66.1	Bridge Street (A726 northwest) / Castle Street	Southeastern terminus of A726
South Lanarkshire	Strathaven	41.5	66.8	A723 northeast to A726 – Hamilton, East Kilbride	Southwestern terminus of A723
East Ayrshire	Galston	56.0	90.1	A719 to A76 / A77 / B7037 – Kilmarnock, Ayr, Glasgow, Galston, Sorn, Waterside, Moscow	To A76 and Kilmarnock signed westbound only, To B7037 and Ayr eastbound only
East Ayrshire	Kilmarnock– Riccarton boundary	59.8– 60.0	96.2– 96.6	M77 northeast / A77 / A76 south / A735 north (Queen's Drive) to B778 – Glasgow, Ayr, Prestwick Airport, Dumfries, Kilmarnock, Mauchline, Auchinleck, Cumnock, Riccarton, Fenwick	Mauchline, Auchinleck and Cumnock signed westbound only, To B778, Riccarton and Fenwick eastbound only; southwestern terminus of M77; northern terminus of A76; southern terminus of A735
East Ayrshire	Riccarton	61.0	98.2	B7038 – Kilmarnock	Junction; eastbound exit and westbound entrance
North Ayrshire	Dreghorn– Irvine boundary	66.2– 66.6	106.5– 107.2	Riverside, Meadowhead	Junction; Meadowhead signed westbound only
North Ayrshire	Irvine	66.9– 67.0	107.7– 107.8	A78 to B746 – Troon, Prestwick Airport, Ayr, Kilwinning, Ardrossan, Greenock, Largs	To B746, Troon and Kilwinning signed westbound only, Largs eastbound only; junction on A78
North Ayrshire	Irvine	67.7	109.0	A737 (Ayr Road) / Riverway to A78 – Ayr, Kilwinning	Western terminus
1.000 mi = 1.609 km; 1.000 km = 0.621 mi: Concurrency terminus; Incomplete access
