= 1999 South Ayrshire Council election =

1999 Scottish local government election

← 1995	6 May 1999	2003 →

All 30 seats to South Ayrshire Council 16 seats needed for a majority
	First party	Second party
Party	Labour	Conservative
Last election	21 seats, 56.0%	4 seats, 28.3%
Seats won	17	13
Seat change	▼4	▲9
Popular vote	24,263	20,907
Percentage	41.1%	35.4%
Swing	▼14.9%	▲7.1%
- Results by ward

The 1999 South Ayrshire Council election was held on 6 May 1999, alongside elections to the Scottish Parliament. Elections were held for all 30 seats.

== Result ==
1999 South Ayrshire Council election result
Party	Seats	Gains	Losses	Net gain/loss	Seats %	Votes %	Votes	+/−
Labour	17	-	-	▼4	57.0	41.1	24,263	▼14.9
Conservative	13	-	-	▲9	43.0	35.4	20,907	▲7.1
SNP	0	-	-	Steady	0.0	23.3	13,732	▲11.3
Independent	0	-	-	Steady	0.0	0.2	118	▼3.3

Note: there were 5 more seats at this election than in 1995

== Ward results ==
=== Troon ===
Troon North
Party	Candidate	Votes	%	±%
Conservative	Alistair Kerr	969	44.86	
Labour	William Cormie	666	30.83	
SNP	David Townsend	525	24.31	
Majority		303	14.03	

Troon West
Party	Candidate	Votes	%	±%
Labour	Gordon McKenzie	980	49.15	
SNP	Steven Brown	515	25.83	
Conservative	Yvonne McIntosh	499	25.03	
Majority		465	23.32	

Troon East
Party	Candidate	Votes	%	±%
Conservative	William McIntosh	912	42.22	
Labour	David Christie	738	34.17	
SNP	Agnes McFarlane	510	23.61	
Majority		174	8.06	

Troon South
Party	Candidate	Votes	%	±%
Conservative	Peter Convery	1,476	68.30	
Labour	Norman Clark	373	17.26	
SNP	Helen Duff	312	14.44	
Majority		1,103	51.04	

=== Prestwick and Monkton ===
Prestwick St Ninian's
Party	Candidate	Votes	%	±%
Conservative	Margaret Toner	928	47.86	
Labour	George Watson	613	31.61	
SNP	Peter McElroy	398	20.53	
Majority		315	16.25	

Prestwick St Cuthbert's and Monkton
Party	Candidate	Votes	%	±%
Conservative	Hugh Hunter	902	41.15	
Labour	Gerald Crawley	788	35.95	
SNP	Isabella Wallace	502	22.90	
Majority		114	5.20	

Prestwick St Nicholas'
Party	Candidate	Votes	%	±%
Labour	Rita Miller	983	50.08	
SNP	Alexander Hamilton	530	27.00	
Conservative	Arthur Dey	450	22.92	
Majority		453	23.08	

Prestwick Kingcase
Party	Candidate	Votes	%	±%
Conservative	Pamela Patterson	906	42.38	
Labour	Esther Clark	850	39.76	
SNP	Stanley Fisher	382	17.87	
Majority		56	2.62	

Prestwick Toll
Party	Candidate	Votes	%	±%
Labour	John Baillie	1,051	52.31	
SNP	Hugh Reid	486	24.19	
Conservative	Elizabeth McGowan	472	23.49	
Majority		375	28.12	

=== Ayr ===
Ayr Newton
Party	Candidate	Votes	%	±%
Labour	Ian Stewart	930	45.79	
SNP	Marie Taylor	568	27.97	
Conservative	David Yorke	533	26.24	
Majority		362	17.82	

Ayr Lochside
Party	Candidate	Votes	%	±%
Labour	Douglas Campbell	1,015	60.71	
SNP	John Wallace	501	29.96	
Conservative	John Rennie	156	9.33	
Majority		514	30.74	

Ayr Whitletts
Party	Candidate	Votes	%	±%
Labour	Alexander Cairns	1,109	65.97	
SNP	Thomas Slider	487	28.97	
Conservative	Lorna Reid	85	5.06	
Majority		663	37.00	

Ayr Craigie
Party	Candidate	Votes	%	±%
Labour	Brenda Campbell	1,036	57.05	
SNP	Robert Colinson	442	24.34	
Conservative	Ruth Gow	338	18.61	
Majority		594	32.71	

Ayr Central
Party	Candidate	Votes	%	±%
Labour	Robert Campbell	728	45.19	
Conservative	Charles Dunlop	385	23.90	
SNP	Andrew MacLeod	380	23.59	
Independent	Ron Berretti	118	7.32	
Majority		343	21.29	

Ayr Fort
Party	Candidate	Votes	%	±%
Conservative	Gibson T MacDonald	1,133	64.48	
Labour	Patricia McLellan	364	31.84	
SNP	Jane Patrick	260	14.80	
Majority		769	33.77	

Ayr Old Belmont
Party	Candidate	Votes	%	±%
Conservative	Winifred Sloan	1,145	55.64	
Labour	Dennis McLellan	593	28.81	
SNP	Fiona Gibb	320	15.55	
Majority		552	26.82	

Ayr Forehill
Party	Candidate	Votes	%	±%
Labour	Sadie Bowie	963	49.11	
SNP	Albany McKay	577	29.42	
Conservative	Garry Clark	421	21.47	
Majority		386	19.68	

Ayr Masonhill
Party	Candidate	Votes	%	±%
Conservative	Mary Kilpatrick	975	44.93	
Labour	Joseph Bulik	691	31.84	
SNP	David Forbes	504	23.23	
Majority		284	13.09	

Ayr Belmont
Party	Candidate	Votes	%	±%
Labour	Agnes Davies	1,108	57.74	
SNP	John Hall	577	30.07	
Conservative	Ian Waller	234	12.19	
Majority		531	27.67	

Ayr Doonfoot and Seafield
Party	Candidate	Votes	%	±%
Conservative	Cherry Young	1,565	68.67	
Labour	Catherine Murray	413	18.12	
SNP	Martha Wheelan	301	13.21	
Majority		1,152	50.55	

Ayr Rozelle
Party	Candidate	Votes	%	±%
Conservative	Robert Reid	1,280	57.66	
Labour	James Craig	529	23.83	
SNP	Shanks Kerr	411	18.51	
Majority		751	33.83	

=== Kyle ===
Dundonald and Loans
Party	Candidate	Votes	%	±%
Conservative	William McNally	804	40.06	
Labour	Alexander Skilling	705	35.13	
SNP	Maureen McElroy	326	24.81	
Majority		99	4.93	

Tarbolton Symington Craigie
Party	Candidate	Votes	%	±%
Labour	John Cree	981	45.73	
Conservative	James Forrest	721	33.61	
SNP	John Allan	443	20.65	
Majority		260	12.12	

Annbank Mossblown St Quivox
Party	Candidate	Votes	%	±%
Labour	David Duncan	1,057	55.96	
SNP	Alister Poole	541	28.64	
Conservative	Gillian Ford	291	15.40	
Majority		516	27.32	

Coylton and Minishant
Party	Candidate	Votes	%	±%
Labour	Lorraine McNicol	867	47.12	
Conservative	Anthony Lewis	587	31.90	
SNP	Donald Stewart	386	20.98	
Majority		280	15.22	

=== Carrick ===
North Carrick and Maybole West
Party	Candidate	Votes	%	±%
Labour	Alan Murray	750	38.11	
Conservative	Jean Wilson	714	36.28	
SNP	Roger Hollins	504	25.61	
Majority		36	1.83	

North Carrick and Maybole East
Party	Candidate	Votes	%	±%
Labour	Andrew Hill	885	48.92	
SNP	Alexander MacKenzie	492	27.20	
Conservative	Anna Hayes	432	23.88	
Majority		393	21.72	

South Carrick
Party	Candidate	Votes	%	±%
Labour	Paul Torrance	1064	49.33	
Conservative	Charity Scott	757	35.10	
SNP	Marion Low	336	15.58	
Majority		307	14.23	

Girvan Ailsa
Party	Candidate	Votes	%	±%
Conservative	Ian Fitzsimmons	651	36.17	
Labour	Margaret Milroy	650	36.11	
SNP	Kathryn Baldwin	499	27.72	
Majority		1	0.06	

Girvan Glendoune
Party	Candidate	Votes	%	±%
Labour	Elizabeth Foulkes	783	51.72	
SNP	Malcolm Kelly	545	36.00	
Conservative	Allison Wild	186	12.29	
Majority		238	15.72	
