= 2003 South Ayrshire Council election =

2003 Scottish local government election

← 1999	3 May 2003	2007 →

All 30 seats to South Ayrshire Council 16 seats needed for a majority
	First party	Second party
Leader		Andrew Hill
Party	Conservative	Labour
Last election	13 seats, 35.4%	17 seats, 41.1%
Seats won	15	15
Seat change	▲2	▼2
Popular vote	20,657	18,296
Percentage	41.5%	36.7%
Swing	▲6.1%	▼4.4%
- A map highlighting party support by electoral ward where red represents the Scottish Labour Party and blue the Scottish Conservative Party.

The 2003 South Ayrshire Council election was held on 1 May 2003, alongside elections to the Scottish Parliament. All 30 seats were up and this was the final election to the council using First Past the Post. Whilst the Scottish Conservative Party were able to achieve more votes than any other party in the council area, they only received 15 seats - no majority administration was formed with the Scottish Labour Party also holding 15 council seats. Labour continued to run the council after the election following a "cut of the cards" to decide which party would run the administration.

== Results ==
2003 South Ayrshire Council election result
Party	Seats	Gains	Losses	Net gain/loss	Seats %	Votes %	Votes	+/−
Conservative	15	2	0	▲2	50.0	41.5	20,657	▲6.1
Labour	15	0	2	▼2	50.0	36.7	18,296	▼4.4
SNP	0	0	0	Steady	0.0	17.3	8,623	▼6.0
Independent	0	0	0	Steady	0.0	2.9	1,447	▲2.7
Scottish Socialist	0	0	0	Steady	0.0	1.3	654	New

== Ward results ==
=== Troon ===
Troon North
Party	Candidate	Votes	%	±%
Conservative	Alistair Kerr	919	49.28	+4.42
Labour	Philip Saxton	512	27.45	−3.38
SNP	John Sawers	434	23.27	−1.07
Majority		407	21.83	+7.80

Troon West
Party	Candidate	Votes	%	±%
Labour	Gordon McKenzie	844	48.65	−0.50
SNP	Agnes McFarlane	460	26.51	+0.68
Conservative	Paul Gregory	378	21.79	−3.24
Majority		384	22.14	−1.18

Troon East
Party	Candidate	Votes	%	±%
Conservative	William McIntosh	704	38.96	−3.24
Independent	Patricia Brown	519	28.72	New
Labour	Stewart Wakelam	373	20.64	−13.53
SNP	Agnes McFarlane	211	11.68	−11.93
Majority		185	10.24	+2.18

Troon South
Party	Candidate	Votes	%	±%
Conservative	Peter Convery	1,296	70.67	+2.37
Labour	Henry Wilson	285	15.54	−1.72
SNP	Robert Inglis	253	13.79	−0.65
Majority		1,011	55.13	+4.09

=== Prestwick and Monkton ===
Prestwick St Ninian's
Party	Candidate	Votes	%	±%
Conservative	Margaret Toner	989	59.54	+11.68
Labour	Patricia McLellan	458	27.57	−4.04
SNP	Alan Stewart	214	12.88	−7.65
Majority		531	31.97	+15.72

Prestwick St Cuthbert's and Monkton
Party	Candidate	Votes	%	±%
Conservative	Hugh Hunter	1,006	53.14	+11.99
Labour	Angela Glen	572	30.22	−5.73
SNP	Isabella Wallace	315	16.64	−6.26
Majority		434	22.92	+17.72

Prestwick St Nicholas'
Party	Candidate	Votes	%	±%
Labour	Helen Moonie	777	47.55	−2.53
Conservative	Thomas McGillivray	488	29.87	+6.95
SNP	James McGibbon	369	22.58	−4.42
Majority		289	17.68	−5.40

Prestwick Kingcase
Party	Candidate	Votes	%	±%
Conservative	Pamela Patterson	1,007	55.00	+12.62
Labour	Michael O'Brien	572	31.24	−8.52
SNP	Marie Taylor	252	13.76	−4.11
Majority		435	23.76	+21.14

Prestwick Toll
Party	Candidate	Votes	%	±%
Labour	George Watson	778	47.41	−4.90
Conservative	Peter Smith	403	24.56	+1.07
SNP	John Allan	346	21.08	−3.11
Scottish Socialist	Annette Johnston	114	6.95	New
Majority		375	22.86	−5.26

=== Ayr ===
Ayr Newton
Party	Candidate	Votes	%	±%
Labour	Ian Stewart	748	44.58	−1.21
Conservative	John Fisher	560	33.37	+7.13
SNP	Thomas Slider	370	22.05	−5.92
Majority		188	11.21	−16.91

Ayr Lochside
Party	Candidate	Votes	%	±%
Labour	Douglas Campbell	722	58.70	−2.01
SNP	John Wallace	220	17.89	−12.07
Conservative	George Wade	184	14.96	+5.63
Scottish Socialist	Amanda McFarlane	104	8.46	New
Majority		502	40.81	+10.07

Ayr Whitletts
Party	Candidate	Votes	%	±%
Labour	Alexander Cairns	880	68.59	+2.62
SNP	Alex Taylor	217	16.91	−12.06
Scottish Socialist	William Tyrie	113	8.81	New
Conservative	Donald Reece	73	5.69	+0.63
Majority		663	51.68	+14.68

Ayr Craigie
Party	Candidate	Votes	%	±%
Labour	Ian Cavana	868	60.40	+3.35
SNP	James McNae	286	19.90	−4.44
Conservative	Alice Mitchell	283	19.69	+1.08
Majority		582	40.50	+7.79

Ayr Central
Party	Candidate	Votes	%	±%
Labour	Robert Campbell	629	44.96	−0.23
Conservative	Kenneth MacPherson	477	34.10	+10.20
SNP	Alister Poole	293	20.94	−2.65
Majority		152	10.86	−10.43

Ayr Fort
Party	Candidate	Votes	%	±%
Conservative	Gibson T MacDonald	1,149	68.35	+3.87
Labour	Margaret McKenzie	297	17.67	−14.17
SNP	Thomas Crozier	235	13.98	−0.82
Majority		852	50.68	+16.91

Ayr Old Belmont
Party	Candidate	Votes	%	±%
Conservative	Winifred Sloan	1,211	64.90	+9.26
Labour	Dennis McLellan	402	21.54	−7.27
SNP	Ian Douglas	253	13.56	−1.99
Majority		809	43.36	+16.54

Ayr Forehill
Party	Candidate	Votes	%	±%
Labour	Gerry Crawley	748	46.98	−2.13
SNP	Albany McKay	359	22.55	−6.87
Conservative	Garry Clark	332	20.85	−0.62
Independent	Kenneth Conway	153	9.62	New
Majority		389	24.43	+2.96

Ayr Masonhill
Party	Candidate	Votes	%	±%
Conservative	Mary Kilpatrick	1,014	53.31	+8.38
Labour	Bill Cormie	536	28.18	−3.66
SNP	David Forbes	352	18.51	−4.72
Majority		478	25.13	+12.04

Ayr Belmont
Party	Candidate	Votes	%	±%
Labour	Edward Bulik	799	50.09	−7.65
SNP	Alexander Oattes	374	23.45	−6.62
Scottish Socialist	James Stewart	214	13.42	New
Conservative	James Grindlay	208	13.04	+0.85
Majority		425	26.64	−1.03

Ayr Doonfoot and Seafield
Party	Candidate	Votes	%	±%
Conservative	Cherry Young	1,624	77.63	+8.96
Labour	George Hodge	293	14.01	−4.11
SNP	James Speirs	175	8.37	−4.84
Majority		1,331	63.62	+13.07

Ayr Rozelle
Party	Candidate	Votes	%	±%
Conservative	Robert Reid	1,314	69.34	+11.68
Labour	Agnes Davies	321	16.94	−6.89
SNP	Andrew Niven	260	13.72	−4.79
Majority		993	52.40	+18.57

=== Kyle ===
Dundonald and Loans
Party	Candidate	Votes	%	±%
Conservative	William McNally	910	53.40	+13.34
Labour	Alexander Skilling	468	27.46	−7.67
SNP	Susan May Jones	326	19.13	−5.68
Majority		447	25.94	+21.01

Tarbolton Symington Craigie
Party	Candidate	Votes	%	±%
Conservative	Hywel Davies	627	33.95	+0.34
Labour	Alexandra Marshall	576	31.19	−14.54
Independent	Sam Gardiner	447	24.20	New
SNP	John Hendrie	152	8.23	−12.42
Scottish Socialist	Martin Gilmartin	45	2.44	New
Majority		51	2.76	+14.88

Annbank Mossblown St Quivox
Party	Candidate	Votes	%	±%
Labour	David Duncan	837	55.39	−0.57
SNP	James Cumming	308	20.38	−8.26
Conservative	Zoe Montgomerie	298	19.72	+4.32
Majority		529	35.01	+7.69

Coylton and Minishant
Party	Candidate	Votes	%	±%
Conservative	Anthony Lewis	753	44.29	+12.39
Labour	Alexandra Lewis	663	39.00	−8.12
SNP	Joseph Robertson	284	16.71	−4.27
Majority		90	5.29	+20.51

=== Carrick ===
North Carrick and Maybole West
Party	Candidate	Votes	%	±%
Labour	Alan Murray	661	41.13	+3.02
Conservative	Alan Shearing	495	30.80	−5.48
SNP	James Cumming	283	17.61	−8.00
Independent	Alison Wild	168	10.46	New
Majority		166	10.33	+8.50

North Carrick and Maybole East
Party	Candidate	Votes	%	±%
Labour	Andrew Hill	648	46.92	−2.00
Conservative	Christopher McCulloch	386	27.95	+4.07
SNP	Roderick Cochran	283	20.49	−6.71
Scottish Socialist	Luan Johnston	64	4.64	New
Majority		262	18.97	−2.75

South Carrick
Party	Candidate	Votes	%	±%
Labour	Paul Torrance	940	51.82	+2.49
Conservative	Frances Dupuy	629	34.67	−0.43
SNP	Martha Wheelan	245	13.51	−2.07
Majority		311	17.15	+2.92

Girvan Ailsa
Party	Candidate	Votes	%	±%
Conservative	Ian Fitzsimmons	740	47.83	+11.66
Labour	Moira Davidson	497	32.13	−3.98
Independent	William O'Hara	160	10.34	New
SNP	Marion Low	150	9.70	−18.02
Majority		243	15.70	+15.64

Girvan Glendoune
Party	Candidate	Votes	%	±%
Labour	John McDowall	592	52.11	+0.39
SNP	Neil Ferguson	344	30.28	−5.72
Conservative	Anne Hastie	200	17.61	+5.32
Majority		248	21.83	+6.11

== By-elections ==
Dundonald and Loans By-Election 15 January 2004
Party	Candidate	Votes	%	±%
Conservative	Arthur Spurling	1,072	55.8	+2.4
Labour	Sandra Marshall	506	26.4	−1.1
SNP	Nan McFarlane	242	12.6	−6.5
Liberal Democrats	Stuart Ritchie	100	5.2	+5.2
Majority		566	29.5	
Turnout		1,920		
Conservative hold		Swing		

The North Carrick and Maybole East by-election was called following the resignation of South Ayrshire Labour Party leader Andy Hill on health grounds. In the election Independent candidate Brian Connolly won by a single vote. The loss of the ward for Labour allowed for the Conservatives to take control of the South Ayrshire Council area, governing with a 15-14 majority.

North Carrick and Maybole East by-election, 2006
Party	Candidate	Votes	%	±%
Independent	Brian Connolly	408	27.70	New
Conservative	Ann Galbraith	407	27.63	−0.32
Labour	Sandra Goldie	342	23.22	−23.70
SNP	William McCubbin	316	21.45	+0.96
Majority		1	0.07	
