= A77 road =

Road in Scotland

A77

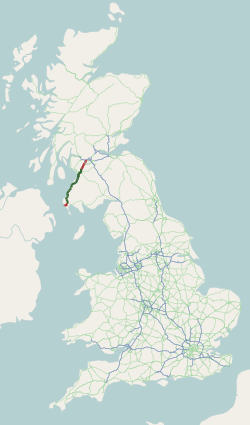

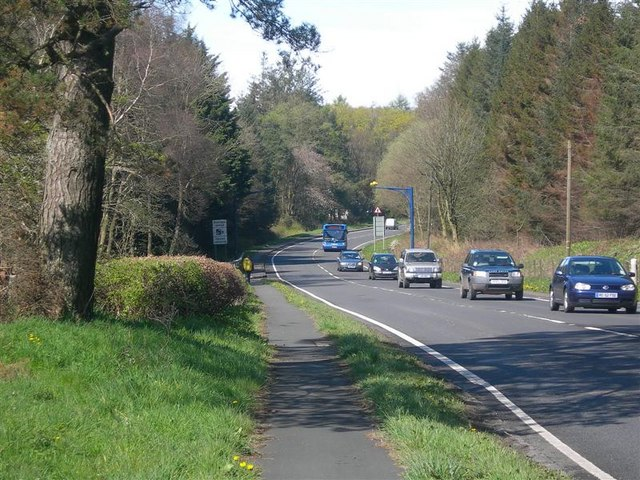
- On The A77 near Minishant, showing SPECS camera

Route information
- Length: 91.5 mi (147.3 km)

Major junctions
- North end: A814 in Glasgow; 55.8563°N 4.2576°W

- M77 near Newton Mearns; M77 in Fenwick; A71 / A77 / A735 in Kilmarnock; A78 near Prestwick; A751 near Stranraer; A75 in Stranraer
- South end: North Crescent / South Crescent in Portpatrick; 54.8418°N 5.1168°W

Location
- Country: United Kingdom
- Primary destinations: Glasgow; Kilmarnock; Ayr; Girvan; Stranraer

Road network
- Roads in the United Kingdom; Motorways; A and B road zones

The A77 road is a major road in Scotland. It runs in a southwesterly direction from the city of Glasgow, past the towns of Giffnock, Newton Mearns, Kilmarnock, Prestwick, Ayr, Girvan and Stranraer to the village of Portpatrick on the Irish Sea. It passes through the council areas of Glasgow City, East Renfrewshire, East Ayrshire, South Ayrshire and Dumfries and Galloway.

It has full trunk road status from the terminus of the M77 motorway at Fenwick to the junction with the A75 in Stranraer. Some sections - most notably those between Turnberry and Girvan, and thereon to Ballantrae, run directly on the coastline with scenic views over the Firth of Clyde and the Irish Sea. The section between Cairnryan and Stranraer runs on the shore of Loch Ryan.

The A77 is an important link from Glasgow to one of its two major airports, Prestwick Airport, and to the two Northern Ireland ferry terminals at Cairnryan. As a result, the road is subject to a busy mixture of commuter, tourist and heavy goods vehicle traffic which has necessitated upgrades to many sections.

== History ==
Bypasses for Ayr and Kilmarnock were built in the 1970s, and the M77 motorway replaced the Glasgow to Newton Mearns section in two stages, in the mid-to-late 1990s, but not without controversy as a section of the motorway was routed through Pollok Country Park.

This still left the East Ayrshire and southern East Renfrewshire stretch of the road which widely appeared in statistics as one of the most dangerous sections of road in Scotland. The majority of this section was an unsegregated, four-lane single carriageway between Kilmarnock and Newton Mearns and the lanes were narrow compared to the standard of other major roads. At several points, it was common for traffic waiting to turn right to queue in the overtaking lane. The speed limit of 60 miles per hour (97 km/h) was widely ignored. Finally, the road narrowed to only two lanes near Newton Mearns, causing long queues.

The combined result was a number of fatal crashes. The Scottish Executive took the decision to replace the entire section up to the Kilmarnock bypass with an extension of the M77 after pressure and campaigning from West Sound and West FM. This section was built in tandem with the A726 Glasgow Southern Orbital which provided a new direct connection between the M77/A77 and East Kilbride, thus diverted most of the southbound traffic bound for the A77 away from the B764 Eaglesham Moor route, and particular removed its dangerous junction with the A77 which was the site of many fatal accidents.

Construction of the motorway was faster than usual, given the eagerness to replace the A77 after another fatal crash in June 2002 resulted in the death of Hugh Davidson, then Chief Inspector of Strathclyde Police, and the motorway was opened in April 2005. This completed a continuous dual carriageway road from Glasgow to Ayr. The original section of the A77 between Newton Mearns and Fenwick was downgraded to a local access route, with one half of the former four lane single carriageway converted to a cycle path.

In an effort to prevent a repeat of the fatalities on the southern section of the road, July 2005 saw the A77 become host to the largest automatic speed limit enforcement system in the whole of the UK. Based on the digital SPECS system rather than the traditional fixed post GATSO film cameras, gantries with automatic numberplate recognition cameras are sited on the road at intervals of between 1 and 5 miles (2 and 8 km) and measure the average speed of traffic. The enforced zone stretches from the Bogend Toll Junction (Dundonald/Tarbolton junction) at its northern end on the dual carriageway section, down to just north of Lendalfoot; a distance of around 32 miles (51 km).

From 10 March 2008 a long term temporary 50 mph (80 km/h) limit from Bogend Toll to Dutch House Roundabout was introduced, following the death in October 2006 of another police officer, Constable Kevin Lowe. Constable Lowe was on duty and en route at approximately 120 mph (190 km/h) in an unmarked car to a call at the time. This speed limit was to remain in force until new grade separated junctions were opened in 2014. As of April 2025, the speed limit is still in force.

There have been continued efforts to improve the road in the south. In the early 1990s, a 2km section south of Lendalfoot and just north of Ballantrae was rediverted further back from the coastline at Snib's Cave due to coastal erosion and to provide a climbing lane to improve overtaking opportunities. Over a decade later, another such project was the Turnberry Climbing Lane which opened in 2005, has enhanced guaranteed overtaking opportunities on the single carriageway section. Another improvement opened in Autumn 2006, the upgraded Whitletts roundabout with traffic lights and spiral lanes. Climbing lanes were added at Haggstone and Drummuckloch and a 0.8-mile (1.3 km) stretch was straightened north of nearby Glenapp in autumn 2008. In 2011 a 1.8-mile (2.9 km) stretch was widened from Park End to Bennane.

In 2022, a bypass opened at Maybole. The bypass was constructed to the west of the town from 2019 and was initially intended to open in Summer 2021. The bypass is expected to improve traffic flow and decrease traffic through Maybole's town centre.

The A77 was formerly part of the Euroroute system, and comprised route E111.

== Proposed developments ==
Further minor improvements are planned with no dates published for:

- Ardwell to Slockenray overtaking lane 1.2 miles (1.9 km)
- Dowhill to Chapeldonan realignment 2.0 miles (3.2 km)

== Junction list ==
Council area	Location	mi	km	Destinations	Notes
Glasgow	Glasgow	0.0	0.0	A814 (Broomielaw) to M8 east – Glasgow Cross	Northern terminus
Glasgow	Tradeston– Gorbals boundary	0.2– 0.3	0.32– 0.48	A8 (Kingston Street / Nelson Street / Norfolk Street) to M8 / M74 / M77 – Gorbals, East Kilbride, Tradeston	Destinations signed southbound only, To M74 signed northbound only
Glasgow	Strathbungo	1.3	2.1	B763 – Govanhill, Pollokshields	B763 is an eastbound one-way street.
Glasgow	Shawlands	2.0	3.2	B768 – Battlefield, Dumbreck, Crossmyloof	
Glasgow	Auldhouse– Newlands– Hillpark– Merrylee boundary	3.1	5.0	B762 – Pollokshaws, Barrhead, Cathcart	
East Renfrewshire	Giffnock	4.7	7.6	A727 (Eastwoodmains Road / Rouken Glen Road) to M77 – East Kilbride, Clarkston, Glasgow, Paisley, Prestwick Airport	
East Renfrewshire	Maidenhill	8.5	13.7	M77 / A726 – Glasgow, Paisley, Kilmarnock, East Kilbride	M77 junction 5
East Ayrshire		13.6– 13.8	21.9– 22.2	M77 northeast – Glasgow, East Kilbride northeast – Eaglesham	No access to M77 southwest or from M77 northeast; M77 junction 6
East Ayrshire		14.9	24.0	A719 southeast – Waterside, Moscow, Galston	
East Ayrshire	Fenwick	16.5– 17.5	26.6– 28.2	M77 northeast / B778 – Glasgow, East Kilbride, Stewarton	
East Ayrshire	Fenwick	17.5– 18.6	28.2– 29.9	B7038 / B7061 – Kilmarnock, Fenwick	Junction; B7061 signed southbound only
East Ayrshire	Kilmarnock boundary	19.4– 19.9	31.2– 32.0	B7082 – Kilmarnock, New Farm Loch	Junction; New Farm Loch signed southbound only
East Ayrshire	Kilmarnock	21.2– 21.7	34.1– 34.9	A71 / A76 south / A735 north – Kilmarnock, Irvine, Dumfries, Edinburgh, Hurlford, Galston, Crosshouse, Mauchline, Cumnock	Junction; Hurlford, Galston, Crosshouse, Mauchline and Cumnock signed northbound only; northern terminus of A76; southern terminus of A735
South Ayrshire		24.7	39.8	B7038 – Kilmarnock	Junction; northbound exit and southbound entrance
South Ayrshire	Coodham	25.5	41.0	B730 – Dundonald, Tarbolton	Junction
South Ayrshire	Symington	26.6– 26.7	42.8– 43.0	Symington, Hansel, Underwood, Ladykirk	Junction; only Symington signed southbound
South Ayrshire	Monkton	28.4	45.7	A78 north / Kilmarnock Road to A79 / B749 – Irvine, Prestwick, Troon, Monkton, Greenock	To B749 and Greenock signed northbound only; southern terminus of A78
South Ayrshire		30.6	49.2	A719 north / B742 / Sandyford Road – Mossblown, Annbank, Galston	Annbank signed southbound only; northern terminus of A719 concurrency
South Ayrshire	Ayr	32.3	52.0	A719 south (High Road) / B743 (Heathfield Road) to A79 – Ayr, Prestwick, Mauchline, Mossblown	Southern terminus of A719 concurrency
South Ayrshire	Ayr	33.9	54.6	A70 (Holmston Road) – Ayr, Edinburgh, Cumnock	
South Ayrshire	Ayr	35.0	56.3	A713 (Dalmellington Road) – Ayr, Dalmellington, Castle Douglas	
South Ayrshire	Ayr	35.8	57.6	A79 north (Maybole Road) – Ayr	Southern terminus of A79
South Ayrshire	Turnberry	49.2	79.2	A719 north (Maidens Road) – Turnberry, Maidens, Ayr	Southern terminus of A719
South Ayrshire	Girvan	55.3	89.0	A714 southeast / Coalposts Road (B7035) – Barrhill, Newton Stewart, Pinmore, Pinwherry	Only Newton Stewart signed northbound; northwestern terminus of A714
Dumfries and Galloway		81.3	130.8	A751 south to A75 – Dumfries	Northern terminus of A751
Dumfries and Galloway	Stranraer	83.4	134.2	Port Rodie (A717 west) to A718 – Kirkcolm	Information signed southbound only; eastern terminus of A717
Dumfries and Galloway	Stranraer	83.6	134.5	A75 east / B737 (London Road) – Town centre, Dumfries	B737 and Town centre signed northbound only; western terminus of A75
Dumfries and Galloway	Stranraer	84.2	135.5	Lewis Street (A718 north)	Southern terminus of A718
Dumfries and Galloway		86.0	138.4	A716 south – Drummore	Northern terminus of A716
Dumfries and Galloway	Portpatrick	91.5	147.3	North Crescent / South Crescent	Southern terminus
1.000 mi = 1.609 km; 1.000 km = 0.621 mi: Concurrency terminus; Incomplete access
