= A70 road =

Road in Scotland

A70

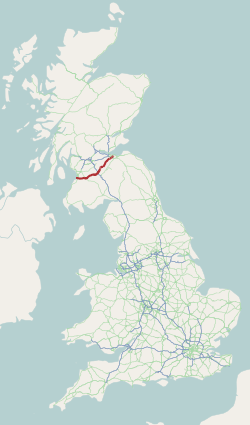

Route information
- Length: 75.5 mi (121.5 km)

Major junctions
- East end: A8 in Edinburgh; 55.9391°N 3.2263°W
- A71 in Edinburgh; A721 in Carnwath; M74 near Douglas; A76 in Cumnock; A77 in Ayr

- West end: A719 in Ayr; 55.4582°N 4.6352°W

Location
- Country: United Kingdom
- Constituent country: Scotland
- Council areas: Edinburgh; South Lanarkshire; East Ayrshire; South Ayrshire
- Primary destinations: Ayr, Cumnock, Lanark, Edinburgh

Road network
- Roads in the United Kingdom; Motorways; A and B road zones
← A69	→ A71

The A70 road is a major road in Scotland, United Kingdom. It runs a total of 74.3 miles (119.6 km) from Edinburgh to Ayr. It begins as Dalry Road at the Haymarket, Edinburgh junction with the A8, passing near but not through Lanark and ending as Miller Road in Ayr. Between Edinburgh city centre and Lanark it passes through the Edinburgh suburbs of Slateford, Juniper Green, Currie and Balerno; then Carnwath (where the A70 joins the A721 for three miles), Carstairs (where the two roads separate again), and Ravenstruther, while between Lanark and Ayr it passes through Hyndford Bridge, Rigside, Douglas, Muirkirk, Smallburn, Cumnock, Ochiltree, and Coylton.

The Scots name of the road is the "Lang Whang", a whang in the Scots tongue being a narrow strip of leather, usually a long leather bootlace. Much of the road is over elevated, desolate moorland; it ascends several times on its course to heights over 1000 feet above sea level. Because the wind enjoys an easy and uninterrupted passage over its length, in winter the road is frequently closed by snow, even by modest snowfalls. The road passes elevated farmland and grouse moor and presents extensive views over central Scotland to the north.

According to tradition, Robert Burns stopped at the formerly thatched Wee Bush Inn in Carnwath on his way to Edinburgh: quite a likely event since the road is the most direct link between the Scottish capital and Burn's native Ayrshire. As the story has it, all Burns could think of to engrave on the inn window (a habit for which he had a reputation) was, "Lang Whang, Lang Whang, Lang bloody Whang", which neatly sums up the prospect for anybody facing the walk, ride or cycle along it, especially in winter. It was one of the roads along which the murderers Burke and Hare brought the cadavers of their victims for the Edinburgh Medical College to dissect.

The Collins 2012 Big Road Atlas shows the A70 as one of the five most dangerous roads in Scotland, based on the number of serious and fatal accidents between 2007 and 2009 in proportion to traffic. There are many extremely dangerous sections: particular blackspots are the crown of Auchinoon Brae on the approach to Harperigg Reservoir and the right angled bends at the east end of the reservoir. Any of the undulating and winding terrain between Balerno and Carnwath where oncoming cars can be concealed by dips in the road can be considered dangerous and there is barely a half-mile stretch of the Lang Whang between Balerno and Carnwath which has not witnessed a fatal accident over the past twenty years.

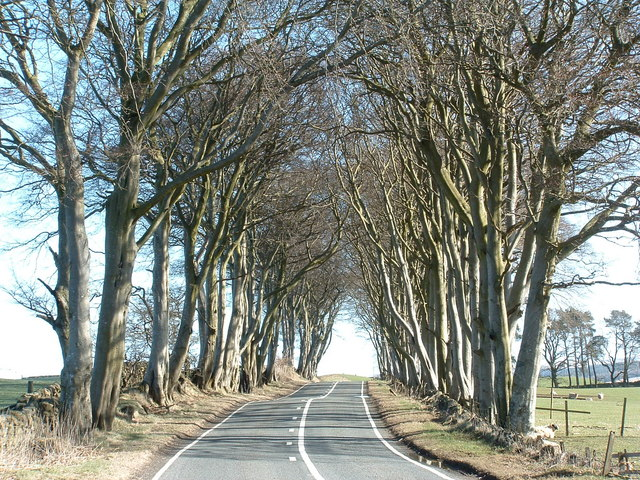
A70 near Crosswood Hill Farm

The A70 is purportedly the scene of one of Scotland's best-known UFO incidents, now known as 'the A70 incident'. Two men, Garry Wood and Colin Wright, were travelling one evening in 1992 from the outskirts of Edinburgh to the village of Tarbrax. Something evidently caused them to be delayed, for they arrived at their destination much later than expected. Several months later the pair underwent hypnotic regression and claimed to recall that they had been abducted, examined and communicated with by alien creatures.

From Little Vantage on the A70 near Harperrig Reservoir, a footpath (called Thieves Road) heads south across the upper reaches of the Water of Leith and continues across moorland to a pass over the Pentland Hills called Cauldstane Slap and on to West Linton. This was part of a much longer drove road used in past centuries for transporting cattle south from the central belt and northern Scotland to Peebles and ultimately to the English markets, and for moving sheep north from West Linton market.

== Junction list ==
County	Location	mi	km	Destinations	Notes
Edinburgh	Edinburgh	0.0	0.0	West Maitland Street / Haymarket Terrace (A8)	Eastern terminus
Edinburgh	Edinburgh	0.6	0.97	Gorgie Road (A71 west) / Murieston Road / Henderson Terrace	No access from A70 east to A71 or from A71 to A70 west; eastern terminus of A71
South Lanarkshire	Carnwath	24.5	39.4	A721 southeast (Caldwell Terrace) – Peebles	Eastern terminus of A721 concurrency
South Lanarkshire	Carstairs	27.3	43.9	A721 northwest to A73 – Carluke, Glasgow	Western terminus of A721 concurrency
South Lanarkshire	Carstairs	28.7	46.2	A743 west – Lanark	Information signed eastbound only; eastern terminus of A743
South Lanarkshire	Lanark	30.8	49.6	A73 north (Hynford Road) to A8 – Lanark, Glasgow	Eastern terminus of A73 concurrency
South Lanarkshire	Carmichael	31.2	50.2	A73 south to M74 / A702 – Carlisle	To M74 signed westbound only, To A702 eastbound only; western terminus of A73 concurrency
South Lanarkshire	Douglas	38.0– 38.3	61.2– 61.6	M74 southeast – Carlisle, Abington B7078 to M74 northwest – Glasgow, Coalburn	M74 junction 11
East Ayrshire	Cumnock	60.8	97.8	A76 – Dumfries, Kilmarnock, New Cumnock, Mauchline, Auchinleck	New Cumnock signed westbound only, Mauchline and Auchinleck eastbound only
South Ayrshire	Ayr	73.8	118.8	A77 to A78 / A79 – Stranraer, Girvan, Glasgow, Kilmarnock, Greenock, Prestwick Airport	
South Ayrshire	Ayr	75.0	120.7	Station Road (A79 north / Ring Road north) – Town centre (N & S)	Ring Road signed westbound only, Town centre signed eastbound only; eastern terminus of A79 concurrency
South Ayrshire	Ayr	75.1	120.9	A713 southeast (Castle Hill Road) – Castle Douglas	Hospital signed eastbound only; Northwestern terminus of A713
South Ayrshire	Ayr	75.2	121.0	Beresford Place (A79 south) to A77 / B7024 – Alloway, Stranraer	Western terminus of A79 concurrency
South Ayrshire	Ayr	75.5	121.5	A719 (Ring Road south / Racecourse Road / Alloway Place) – Maidens	Western terminus
1.000 mi = 1.609 km; 1.000 km = 0.621 mi: Concurrency terminus; Incomplete access
