= Springholm =

Coordinates: 55°00′39″N 3°52′01″W

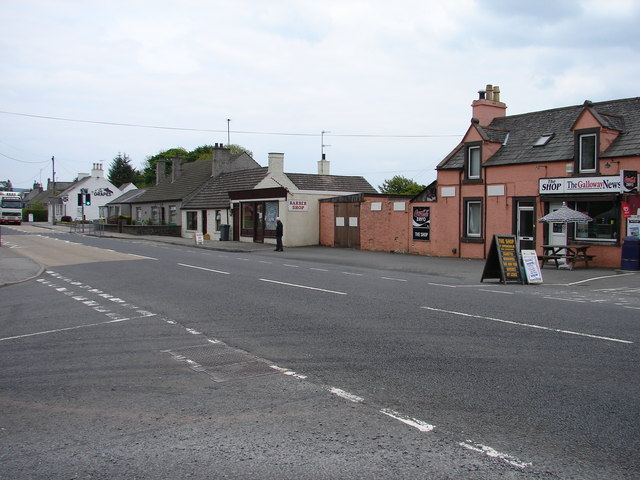
- Springholm in May 2008

- Location within Dumfries and Galloway
- OS grid reference: NX804699
- Council area: Dumfries and Galloway
- Lieutenancy area: Kirkcudbrightshire
- Country: Scotland
- Sovereign state: United Kingdom
- Post town: CASTLE DOUGLAS
- Postcode district: DG7
- Police: Scotland
- Fire: Scottish
- Ambulance: Scottish
- UK Parliament: Dumfries and Galloway
- Scottish Parliament: Galloway and West Dumfries

Springholm is a village in the historical county of Kirkcudbrightshire in Dumfries and Galloway, Scotland. It is located 14 miles (23 km) west of Dumfries on the A75. The village has a primary school, which also serves for the local village of Kirkpatrick Durham. Springholm and Crocketford (2 miles or 3 km to the north-east) are the only two settlements that are not bypassed by the A75. The village is located in the historical county of Kirkcudbrightshire.
