= Kincaidston =

Coordinates: 55.43914°N 4.60808°W

- Location within South Ayrshire
- OS grid reference: NS351192
- Council area: South Ayrshire
- Lieutenancy area: Ayrshire and Arran
- Country: Scotland
- Sovereign state: United Kingdom
- Post town: AYR
- Postcode district: KA7
- Dialling code: 01292
- Police: Scotland
- Fire: Scottish
- Ambulance: Scottish
- UK Parliament: Ayr, Carrick and Cumnock
- Scottish Parliament: Ayr

Kincaidston is a housing scheme in the town of Ayr in South Ayrshire, Scotland. The estate borders Belmont to the north, Alloway to the west and the A77 to the south and east.

== History ==
The estate was built in the 1970s. It was built by Kyle and Carrick District Council and Digital Equipment Corporation to house workers for a nearby factory development. The estate remains partly in council hands (now South Ayrshire Council) although many of the houses are now privately owned. Most of the streets are named after flowers (for example, Celandine Bank, Honeysuckle Park and Speedwell Square) apart from Kincaidston Drive, the estate's main road.

Prior to development, Kincaidston was a farm on the outskirts of Ayr. During World War I, a Sopwith Camel crashed at the farm on 8 February 1918, killing the pilot, Captain Victor George Anderson Bush, who had been based at No.1 School of Aerial Fighting at Turnberry.

On 18 October 2021, four people were injured in an explosion that destroyed a house on Gorse Park and damaged multiple others.

== Services ==
Kincaidston Primary School is located within the estate. Other amenities include a community centre, a bowling club, a Spar shop, a church, a youth cafe and several vacant units at the Cornhill Shopping Centre. There is a GP surgery and a LloydsPharmacy at the Bankfield Medical Practice. Annfield Burn flows through the scheme at the north side.

== Notable people ==
- Ewan McVicar (born 1994), DJ and music producer, grew up on Heather Park in the estate; his 2022 EP Heather Park is named after the street.

== See also ==
- List of places in South Ayrshire
- Public housing in the United Kingdom
