= Crocketford =

Coordinates: 55°02′09″N 3°49′46″W

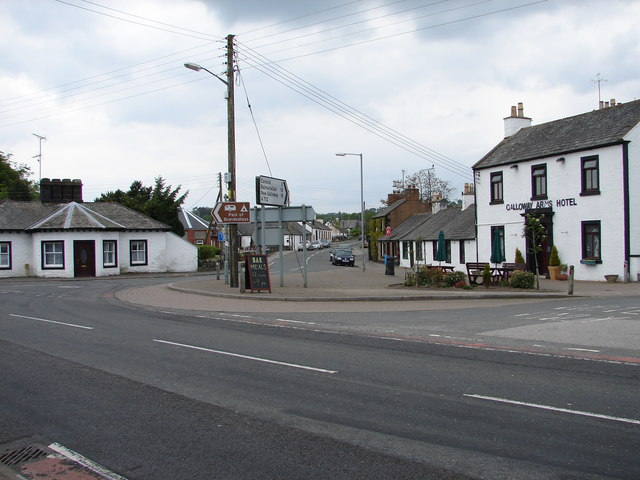
- Central Crocketford

- Location within Dumfries and Galloway
- OS grid reference: NX832727
- Council area: Dumfries and Galloway
- Country: Scotland
- Sovereign state: United Kingdom
- Post town: DUMFRIES
- Postcode district: DG2
- Police: Scotland
- Fire: Scottish
- Ambulance: Scottish
- UK Parliament: Dumfries and Galloway
- Scottish Parliament: Galloway and West Dumfries

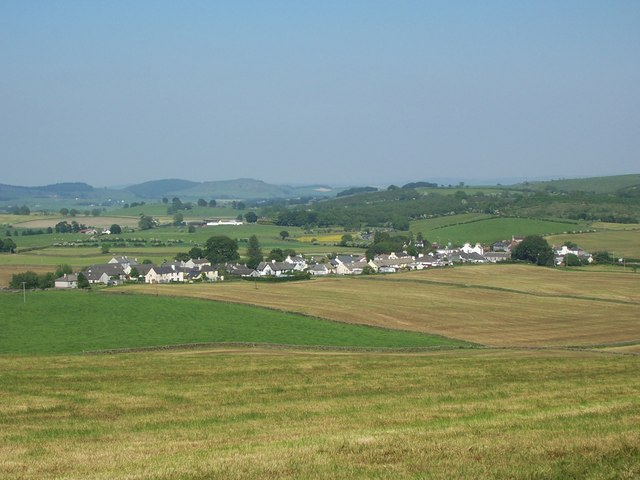
Crocketford from the surroundings

Crocketford (/ˈkrɒkɪtfɔːd/, also frequently /ˈkrɒkɪtfəd/) also known as Ninemile Bar (Scottish Gaelic: Ath Crogaid), as it is approximately equidistant between Castle Douglas and Dumfries, is a village in the historical county of Kirkcudbrightshire in the Dumfries and Galloway council area near the boundary between Scotland and England. It is located on the A75 road around 9 miles (14 km) west of Dumfries. Crocketford is one of only two settlements that are not bypassed by the A75 along with Springholm, around 2 miles (3 km) to the south-west.

The Buchanites were the followers of Elspeth Buchan (1738-1791), who claimed to be the Woman Clad with the Sun from the Book of Revelation. After expulsion from Dumfriesshire they eventually settled at Newhouse in the village. A small burial ground at the property contained the remains of various members of the sect.
