= Heathfield, South Ayrshire =

Suburb of Ayr, South Ayrshire, Scotland

Coordinates: 55°28′44″N 4°36′36″W

Heathfield is a major district of Ayr, Scotland. Heathfield is on the borders of Ayr and Prestwick and is located beside the A77 Ayr by-pass. The Whitletts roundabout in Heathfield is the main roundabout connecting Ayr with other towns and cities. Heathfield has a lot of aviation history especially during World War II where there was an RAF base called RAF Heathfield.

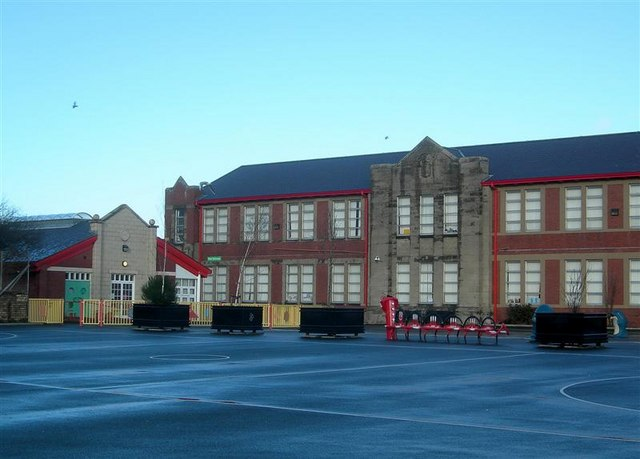
Heathfield Primary School

== Shopping ==
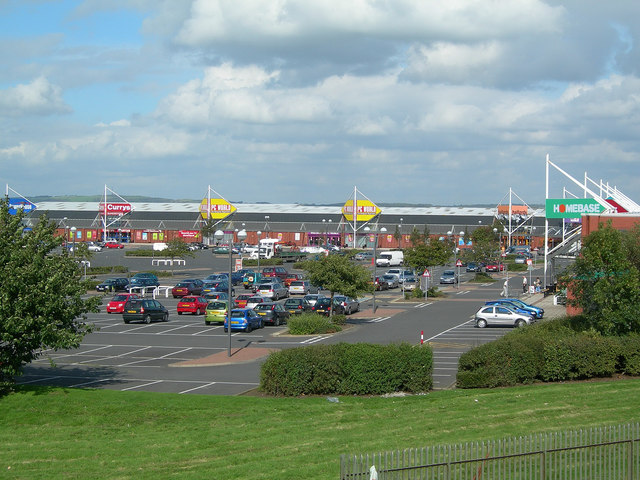
Heathfield Retail Park

Heathfield Retail Park, which opened in 1994, is built in the southerly reaches of the site of the RAF station. This was originally marked by a replica Supermarine Spitfire at the entrance to the park. The road into the park is named Liberator Drive, in recognition of the large numbers of Consolidated Liberator bombers that were serviced in the area during World War II. It is the central out of town shopping complex, with outlets including Homebase, PC World, Frankie & Benny's, Subway, and Asda as well as Pizza Hut and KFC. Travelodge hotel is also now open as well as a Holiday Inn.

== Heathfield Hospital ==
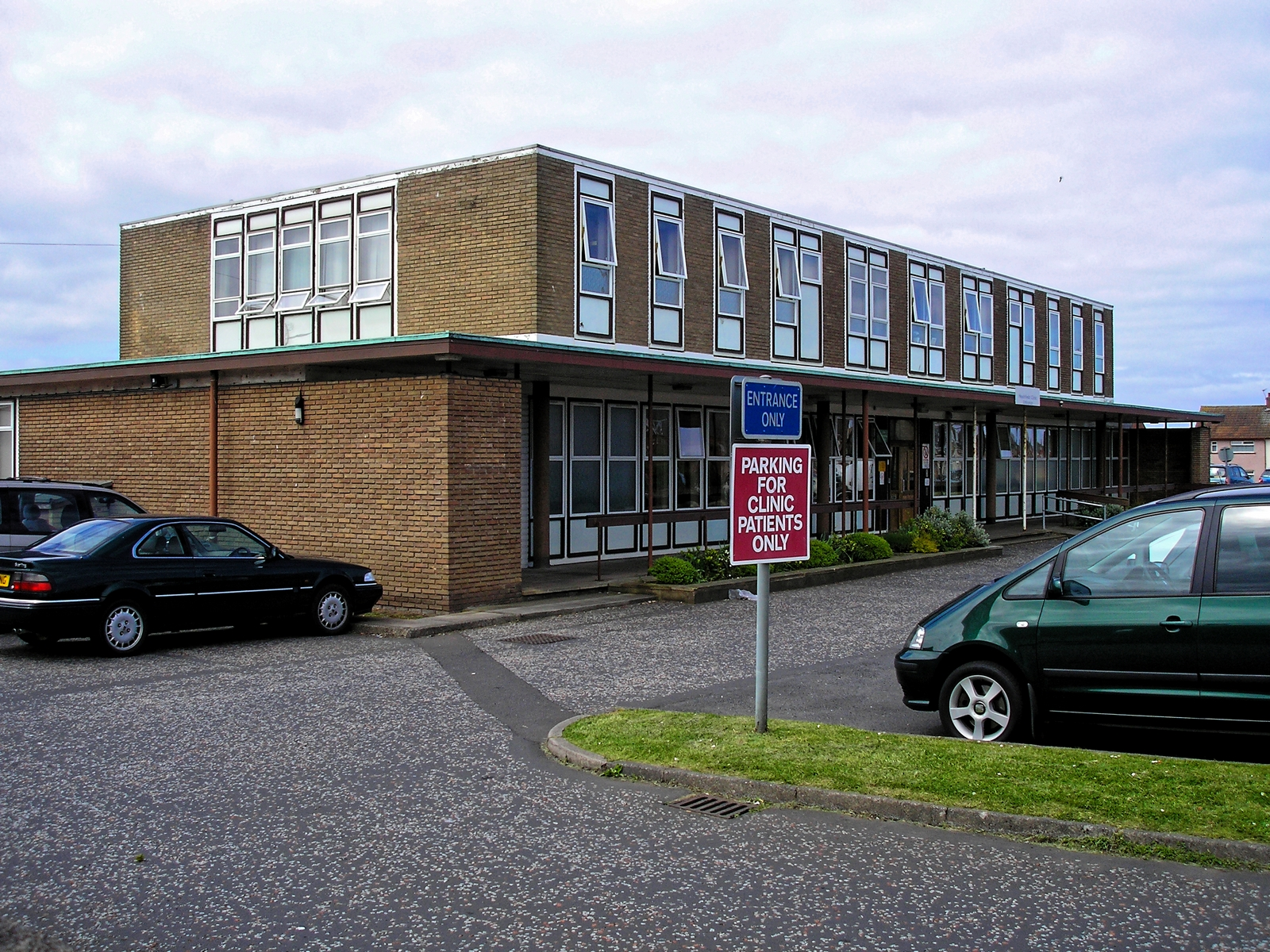
Heathfield Clinic

Heathfield was once the site of the Burgh Fever Hospital, which evolved to become Heathfield Hospital, and then Heathfield Clinic before closing in 2014.

== Newton Loch ==
Newton Loch was situated in a low-lying area near Newton-on-Ayr, just south of the old South and West Sanquhar Farms. It is now only (2016) visible as remnant heath land and surface darkening in pastureland, situated mainly in the Parish of Ayr and partly in St Quivox.

The original outflow of Newton Loch was directly into the sea at Newton-on-Ayr via the Half Mile Burn and another outflow was the lade that ran down the Newton-on-Ayr Main Street to the Newton Mill or Malt Mill that was located on the bank of the River Ayr near where the New Bridge of Ayr is located. The last remnant in 1947 was a patch of marsh land located just to the south of Heathfield Hospital, an area now covered by a housing estate.
