= A75 road =

Road in Scotland

A75

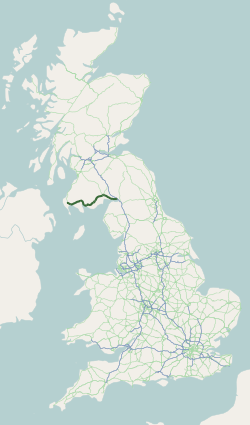

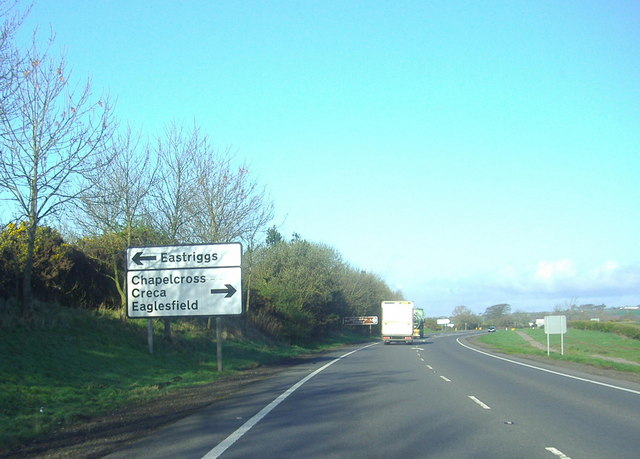
- Road sign on the A75

Route information
- Part of
- Length: 95.6 mi (153.9 km)
- Existed: 1923–present

Major junctions
- East end: A74(M) in Gretna

- A701 in Dumfries; A76 in Dumfries; A751 near Stranraer
- West end: A77 in Stranraer

Location
- Country: United Kingdom
- Constituent country: Scotland
- Council areas: Dumfries and Galloway
- Primary destinations: Carlisle, Gretna, Dumfries, Stranraer

Road network
- Roads in the United Kingdom; Motorways; A and B road zones

The A75 is a primary trunk road in Scotland, linking Stranraer and its ferry ports at Cairnryan with the A74(M) at Gretna, close to the border with England and the M6 motorway.

== Route ==
Heading west along the south coast of Scotland from its junction with the A74(M) motorway at Gretna it continues past Eastriggs, Annan, Dumfries, Castle Douglas, Gatehouse of Fleet, Newton Stewart, Kirkcowan and Glenluce before ending at Stranraer.

The majority of the road is of single-carriageway standard, although a few short dual carriageway sections exist, including a one-mile section past Gretna, a section past Collin (just east of Dumfries,) a two-mile section just west of Dumfries and a 1-mile section at Barlae (Between Glenluce and Newton Stewart).

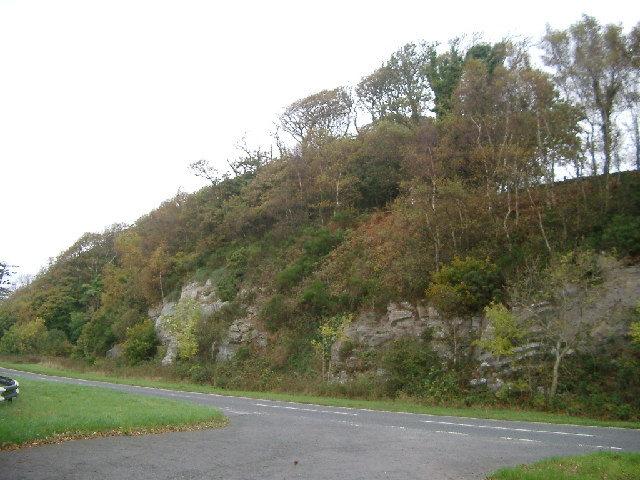
Road cutting of A75 at Barholm Wood, between Castle Douglas and Newton Stewart, in 2005

There are also numerous three-lane overtaking sections which allow overtaking in one direction or on some occasion both directions. The road has recently been re-routed at Carrutherstown (near Dumfries) and a bypass has been constructed to avoid the village of Dunragit and the frequently struck Challoch Railway Bridge, which has earned the title of "most hit bridge in the UK."

There are only two service stations on the A75: one at Collin on the eastern edge of Dumfries, and one at Castle Kennedy to the east of Stranraer.

The road forms part of the international E-road, European route E18.

The majority of heavy goods vehicles which cross the short sea route of the North Channel via Cairnryan use the A75, with a much as 90% of HGV traffic using the A75.

In January 2020, Transport Scotland concluded a transport study of South West Scotland and outlined options for investment to the A75 and other trunk roads. In case of the construction of an Irish Sea Bridge from Great Britain to Northern Ireland (Wigtownshire to County Antrim), further road widening and potentially an upgrade to motorway status may be required.

== History ==
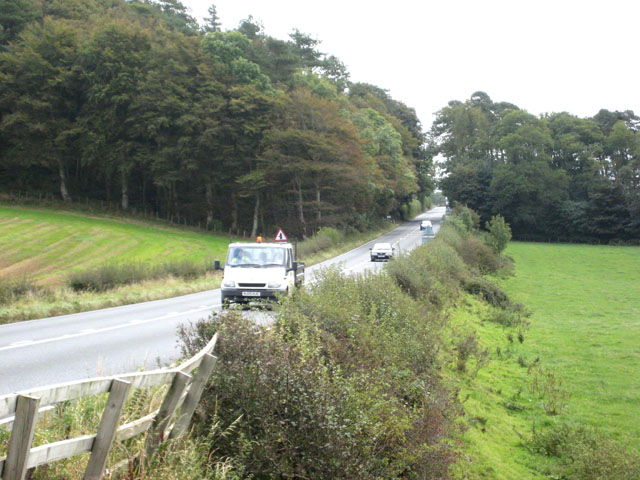
Old section of A75 east of Carrutherstown, close to Braehill Oak Wood, in 2007. It is now a bypassed local road.

The mostly single-carriageway road has been re-aligned, re-routed and bypasses most towns in recognition of the heavy freight traffic it carries between the A74(M)/M6 and the ferry ports for Northern Ireland at Cairnryan. Only two settlements are now not bypassed by it (at Springholm and Crocketford, which are situated 10 and 12 miles west of Dumfries respectively.

The 1.3-mile stretch of dual carriageway and associated one-mile westbound overtaking lane one-mile west of Dumfries opened in 1999, which replaced the previous bottleneck road which snaked up a wooded glen and afforded no overtaking opportunity by way of solid double white lines for its duration, locally known as The Glen. The new section claimed the title after the previous road was declassified and closed at the western end, allowing only local access to residential property and agricultural land.

Transport Scotland has six completed projects announced in 2008 to improve stretches of the A75.

1. Barfil to Bettyknowes Project – westbound overtaking opportunity over a length of 875metres and re-alignment.
2. Cairntop to Barlae Project – eastbound overtaking opportunity of 2.5 kilometres, utilising the line of a disused railway line.
3. Dunragit Bypass Project – bypass of the village of Dunragit, to the east of Stranraer, through which the A75 runs at present.
4. Hardgrove Project – the construction of a new 3.6 kilometre stretch of the A75, between Carrutherstown and Upper Mains Farm in Dumfries and Galloway, providing improved overtaking facilities in both the east and westbound directions.
5. Newton Stewart DAL Project – westbound overtaking opportunity over a length of 375 metres.
6. Planting End to Drumflower Project – eastbound overtaking opportunity over a length of 1 kilometre

Previously the road ran between Annan & Gretna further south than its current locale. The previous road which is identified locally as the "low road" can be recognised from the B721 road. A large majority of the remaining road previously ran through towns & settlements which have been bypassed over time, most sections of the A75 have been straightened, bypassed and re-aligned, with the majority still visible as minor roads and easily identifiable by studying Ordnance Survey maps of the area. One of the earliest bypasses on the route is that of Kirkcowan, which is believed to be the first village, town or settlement to have been bypassed by the original A75.

The previous county and regional councils held responsibility for the A75 prior to 1996 and continually upgraded and re-aligned the A75 over several decades forming much of the current alignment. Bypasses at Glenluce, Shennanton, Newton Stewart, Blackcraig, Creetown, Carsluith, Skyreburn, Gatehouse of Fleet/Barharrow, Tywnholm, Valleyfield, Ringford, Bridge of Dee, Castle Douglas, Ramhill, Southpark, Dumfries, Collin, Raffles, Carrutherstown, Annan and Gretna along with substantial re-alignment elsewhere were built during the 80's and 90's to form much of the current standard of road seen today. The only limited improved sections still in existence but widened are between Barlae and Shennanton (Kirkcowan) and Kirkclaugh to Mossyard (Gatehouse of Fleet).

== Reports of haunting ==
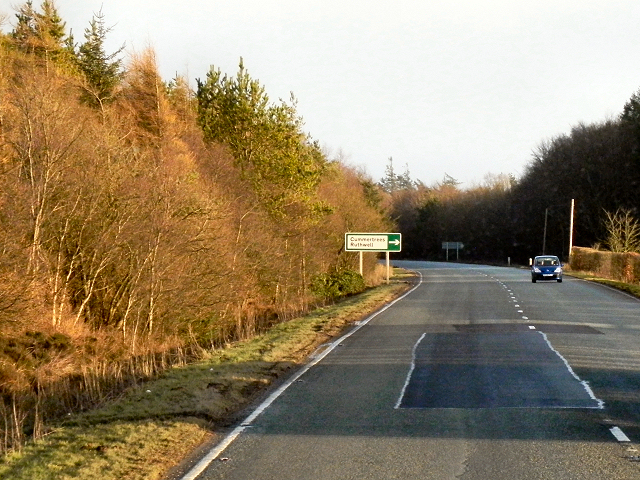
Eastbound Kinmount Straight section of A75, adjacent to Kelhead Moss Plantation

A four-mile stretch of the A75 known as the Kinmount Straight between Carrutherstown and Annan, is claimed by some to be haunted. The section adjacent to Kelhead Moss Plantation (an effective avenue of trees), near Kinmount House, is a main site of the alleged mysterious events. Sightings have been claimed to have been seen near the Swordwellrigg hamlet on the Annan bypass.

=== 1962 ===
Derek and Norman Ferguson were driving along the A75 near Kinmount, around midnight, when they claim that a large hen flew towards their window screen but vanished on the point of impact. They claim that the hen was followed by an old lady who ran towards the car waving her outstretched arms. They say that she was followed by a screaming man with long hair and further animals, including 'great cats, wild dogs, goats, more hens and other fowl, and stranger creatures', who all disappeared. They further claim that the temperature then dropped, and when the brothers stopped the car, it began to sway violently back and forth. Derek got out of the car and the movement stopped. He climbed back in and then, finally, claims that a vision of a furniture van came towards them before disappearing.

== Junction list ==
Council area	Location	mi	km	Destinations	Notes
Dumfries and Galloway	Gretna	0.0	0.0	A74(M) southeast to M6 – England, Carlisle	Eastern terminus; access only to A74(M) southeast and from A74(M) northwest
Dumfries and Galloway		0.1	0.16	B7076 to A74(M) / A6071 – Gretna Green, Gretna, Longtown, Glasgow, Edinburgh	Only B7076 and Gretna signed westbound; no eastbound entrance
Dumfries and Galloway		21.2	34.1	A780 west (Annan Road) to A710 – Dumfries, Solway Coast	To A710 and Solway Coast signed westbound only; eastern terminus of A780
Dumfries and Galloway		22.1	35.6	A709 – Dumfries, Lockerbie	
Dumfries and Galloway	Dumfries	23.2	37.3	A701 (Edinburgh Road) to A74(M) / M74 – Dumfries, Glasgow, Edinburgh, Locharbriggs	To M74 signed eastbound only
Dumfries and Galloway	Dumfries	24.7	39.8	A76 (Glasgow Road) – Dumfries, Kilmarnock	
Dumfries and Galloway		26.0	41.8	A780 east (Castle Douglas Road) – Dumfries	Western terminus of A780
Dumfries and Galloway	Crocketford	33.8	54.4	A712 west (Maiden Row) – Corsock, Balmaclellan, New Galloway	Eastern terminus of A712
Dumfries and Galloway		40.6	65.3	A745 east to A711 / B736 – Castle Douglas, Dalbeattie, Auchencairn	Western terminus of A745
Dumfries and Galloway	Castle Douglas boundary	41.9	67.4	A713 – Ayr	
Dumfries and Galloway		45.7	73.5	A711 east – Kirkcudbright	Western terminus of A711
Dumfries and Galloway	Ringford	47.6	76.6	A762 north – New Galloway, Ringford	Eastern terminus of A762 concurrency
Dumfries and Galloway		48.6	78.2	A762 south to A711 – Kirkcudbright	Western terminus of A762 concurrency
Dumfries and Galloway		53.4	85.9	A755 east to B727 – Borgue, Kirkcudbright	To B727 and Kirkcudbright signed eastbound only; western terminus of A755
Dumfries and Galloway		70.8	113.9	A712 east to B7079 – New Galloway, Minnigaff, Newton Stewart	Newton Stewart signed westbound only; western terminus of A712
Dumfries and Galloway	Newton Stewart	71.9	115.7	A714 (Wigtown Road / Queen Street) – Wigtown, Newton Stewart, Minnigaff	Minnigaff signed eastbound only
Dumfries and Galloway		85.8	138.1	A747 southeast – Port William	Northwestern terminus of A747
Dumfries and Galloway		93.9	151.1	A751 north to A77 – Ayr, Cairnryan	Southern terminus of A751
Dumfries and Galloway	Stranraer	95.6	153.9	A77 (Station Street / Stair Drive) / London Road to A718 – Portpatrick, Kirkcolm	Western terminus
1.000 mi = 1.609 km; 1.000 km = 0.621 mi: Incomplete access
