= Garrion Bridge =

Coordinates: 55.737402°N 3.922871°W

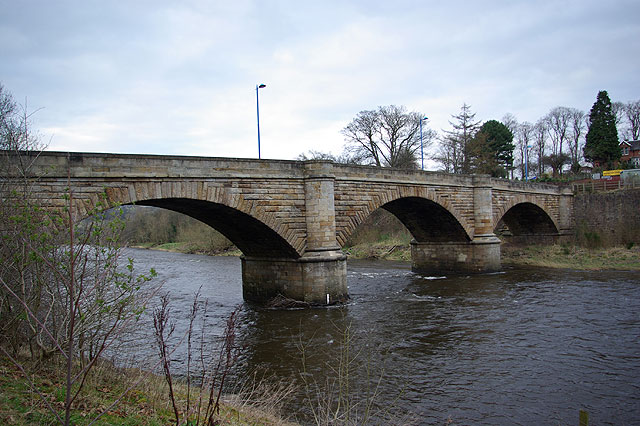
- Old Garrion Bridge

- Location within North Lanarkshire
- OS grid reference: NS792510
- Council area: North Lanarkshire
- Lieutenancy area: Lanarkshire
- Country: Scotland
- Sovereign state: United Kingdom
- Post town: WISHAW
- Postcode district: ML2
- Dialling code: 01698
- Police: Scotland
- Fire: Scottish
- Ambulance: Scottish
- UK Parliament: Motherwell and Wishaw
- Scottish Parliament: Motherwell and Wishaw

Designations

Listed Building – Category B
- Official name: Dalserf, Garrion Bridge, River Clyde
- Designated: 12 January 1979
- Reference no.: LB5172

Garrion Bridge is a small hamlet spanning the border between North Lanarkshire and South Lanarkshire, Scotland. It is located on the banks of the Clyde Valley, 18 miles (29 km) south-east of Glasgow. The hamlet is most commonly associated with the nearby town of Wishaw.

== Development ==
The hamlet has grown around a main river crossing of the River Clyde in Lanarkshire. The area spans both sides of the river, with some of the houses actually located in South Lanarkshire. There are more than a dozen houses located around the bridge. There is an independent garden and antique centre, operating in the premises of the recently closed Banana ripery operated by Fyffes.

== Transport links ==
The area is still dominated by the river crossing, which remains the most important bridge over the Clyde for several miles in either direction. The original bridge, constructed in 1817 and still in use, was supplemented in 2002 by a new bridge slightly upstream, creating for the first time a bi-directional flow of traffic over the river in the form of a roundabout. Prior to this, Garrion Bridge was a notorious traffic bottleneck, with an acute crossroads formed by the junctions of the A71 and A72. As the original (1817) bridge was single lane, the traffic was signal-controlled with only one direction able to cross the bridge at any one time. This led to huge delays, also in part due to the meeting of the A71 from the west and the A72 from the north having a very acute angle with no turning restrictions, which often led to large vehicles becoming stuck. This was rectified by moving the intersection of the northern A72 and western A71 almost 1/2 mile (800 metres) up the valleyside to a new roundabout, and removing the original alignment of the A72. This work was carried out at the same time of the construction of the new bridge in 2001.

There is some public transport in the area, with an hourly bus service provided by First Glasgow service 251 operating between Larkhall and Wishaw Hospital. This bus runs Monday to Sunday all day. Stuarts Coaches operate the 243 between Carluke and Hamilton, this runs every 70 min Monday to Saturday during the day. Stuarts also operate the 317 approx every 90 min between Lanark and Hamilton via the Clyde Valley. This runs all day Monday to Sunday.
