= A719 road =

Road in South Ayrshire, Scotland

A719

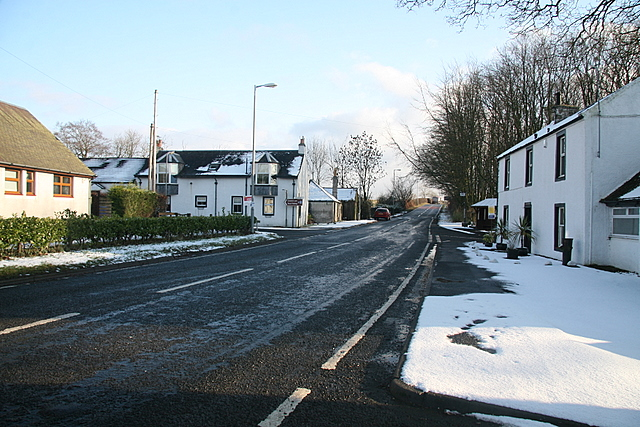
- The A719 passing through Moscow, East Ayrshire

Location
- Country: United Kingdom

Road network
- Roads in the United Kingdom; Motorways; A and B road zones

The A719 is a local road in Ayrshire, Scotland, connecting Girvan and the Ayrshire coastline with Glasgow via Ayr and Galston. Among other locations it passes the Trump Turnberry golf resort and the hamlet of Moscow.

== Route ==
The road runs along the South Ayrshire coastline adjacent to the Firth of Clyde, and the East Ayrshire countryside. It connects Girvan to Glasgow via Maidens, Ayr, Galston, Turnberry, Kilmarnock, Waterside and Moscow. The road starts and ends on the A77, a major road between Glasgow and Stranraer. The A719 runs parallel to the A77 for its length and crosses it northeast of Ayr.

The original route of the A719 was described by the Ministry of Transport in 1923 as "Milton – Pennyglen – Doonfoot – Ayr". It was extended northeast from Ayr to the A77 north of Waterside in 1935.

== Landmarks ==
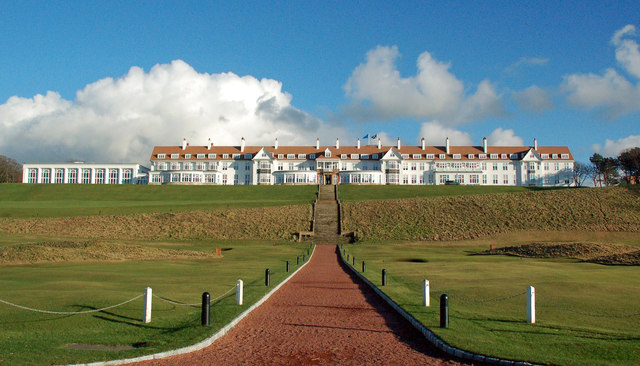
The Trump Turnberry hotel, viewed from the A719

At the southern end of the A719, the road runs close to Turnberry Castle, believed to be birthplace of Robert the Bruce, and the Trump Turnberry golf resort. The road runs through the centre of the Turnberry resort, with the hotel on one side and the course on the other.

The A719 is famous for being the route of the Electric Brae between Drumshrang and Knoweside. A 0.25-mile (0.40 km) section of the road following the Croy Railway Viaduct presents an optical illusion to drivers, which makes viewers at the Brae believe vehicles can roll uphill. There is a stone marker describing the Brae at a point alongside the road.

In the centre of Ayr, the A719 crosses the River Ayr on the New Bridge, designed by Blyth and Cunningham and built between 1877 and 1879. The bridge is now Category B listed. It replaces an earlier bridge constructed by Alexander Stevens in 1789, which had become unsafe owing to flooding in 1877. Between Galston and Moscow it crosses the River Irvine on a Category B listed bridge built in 1839.
