= Carrutherstown =

Village in south west Scotland

Coordinates: 55.0333°N 3.4060°W

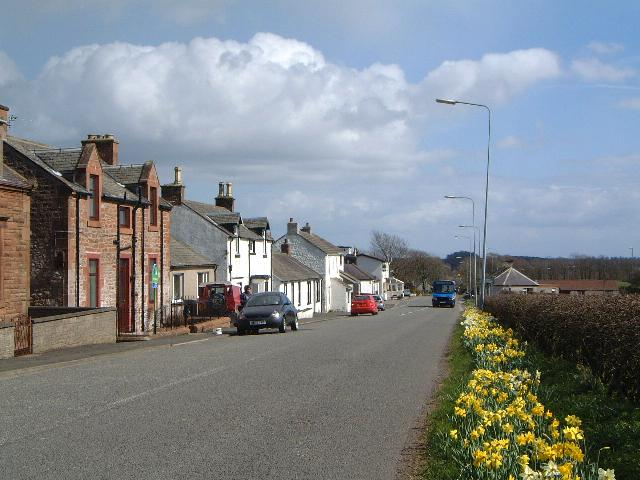
- The former A75 road in Carrutherstown

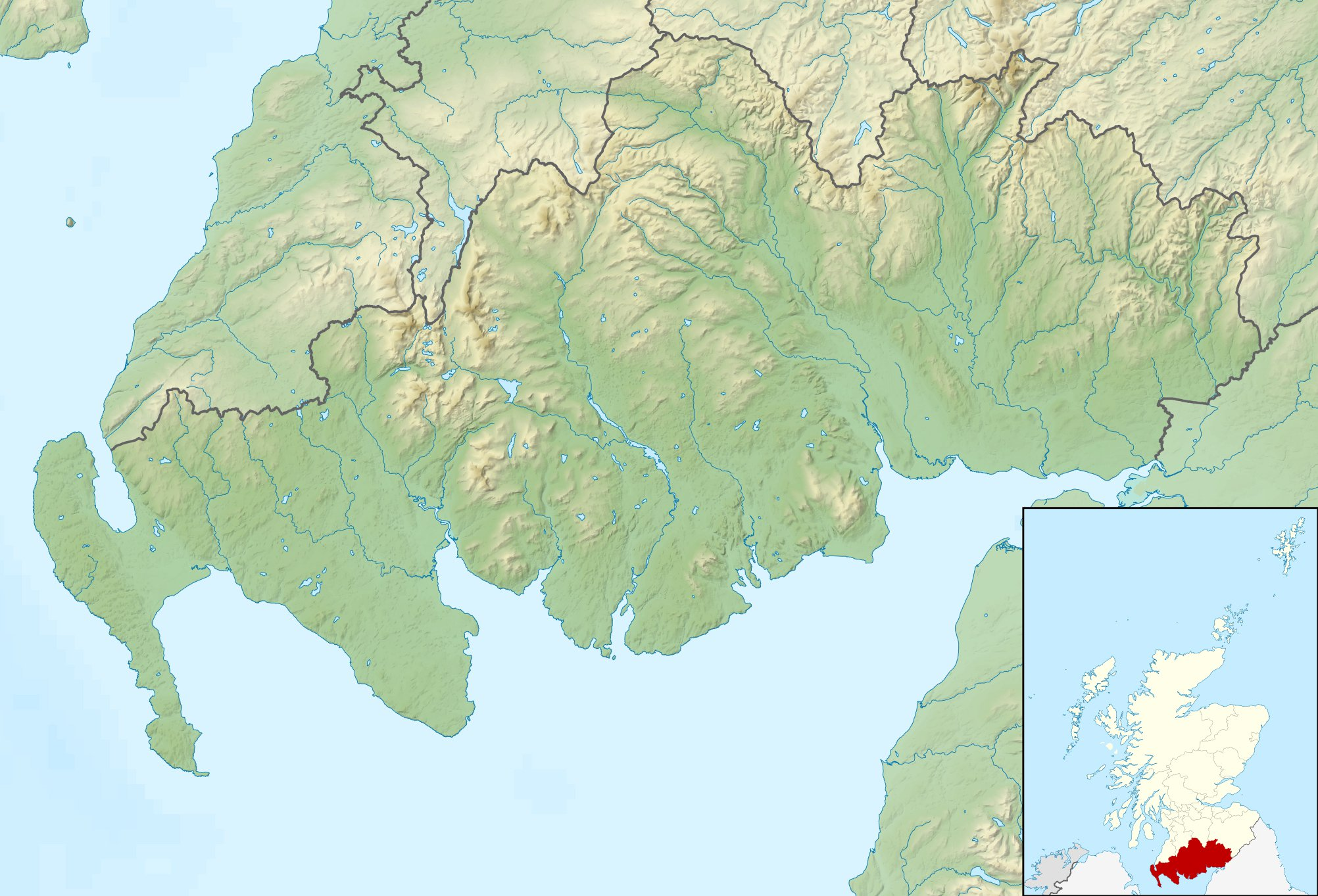
- Location within Dumfries and Galloway
- OS grid reference: NY102718
  - Edinburgh: 64 mi (103 km)
  - London: 279 mi (449 km)
- Community council: Dalton and Carrutherstown
- Council area: Dumfries and Galloway
- Country: Scotland
- Sovereign state: United Kingdom
- Post town: DUMFRIES
- Postcode district: DG1
- Dialling code: 01387
- Police: Scotland
- Fire: Scottish
- Ambulance: Scottish
- UK Parliament: Dumfriesshire, Clydesdale and Tweeddale
- Scottish Parliament: Dumfriesshire

Carrutherstown is a village in the civil parish of Dalton, in Dumfries and Galloway, Scotland. It is about 9 miles (14 km) east of Dumfries.

== Demographics ==
The population data for Carrutherstown is aggregated with neighbouring Dalton and as at 2022 the local authority estimates the combined total to be 333.
