= 1995 South Ayrshire Council election =

1995 Scottish local government election

← 1992	6 April 1995	1999 →

All 25 seats to South Ayrshire Council 13 seats needed for a majority
	First party	Second party
Party	Labour	Conservative
Last election	9 seats, 38.8%	16 seats, 47.7%
Seats won	21	4
Seat change	▲12	▼12
Popular vote	27,544	13,952
Percentage	56.0%	28.3%
Swing	▲17.2%	▼19.4%
- Results by ward.

The 1995 South Ayrshire Council election was held on 6 April 1995, alongside the wider Scottish local elections. All 25 seats were up for election.

== Result ==
1995 South Ayrshire Council election result
Party	Seats	Gains	Losses	Net gain/loss	Seats %	Votes %	Votes	+/−
Labour	21	-	-	▲12	84.0	56.0	27,544	▲17.2
Conservative	4	-	-	▼12	16.0	28.3	13,952	▼19.4
SNP	0	-	-	Steady	0.0	12.0	5,904	▲3.6
Independent	0	-	-	Steady	0.0	3.5	1,715	▲3.0
Independent Labour	0	-	-	Steady	0.0	0.2	105	▼0.4
