= A76 road =

Road in Scotland

A76

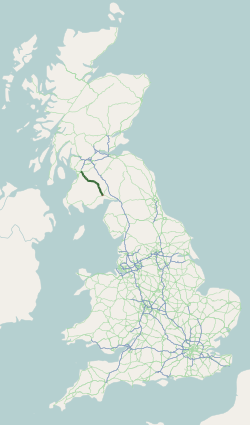

Route information
- Length: 56.1 mi (90.3 km)

Major junctions
- South end: A780 in Dumfries; 55.0687°N 3.6189°W
- A75 in Dumfries
- North end: A71 / A77 / A735 in Kilmarnock; 55.5967°N 4.4748°W

Location
- Country: United Kingdom
- Constituent country: Scotland
- Council areas: Dumfries and Galloway, East Ayrshire
- Primary destinations: Kilmarnock, Dumfries Irvine Glasgow Cumnock

Road network
- Roads in the United Kingdom; Motorways; A and B road zones

The A76 road is a major trunk road in south west Scotland.

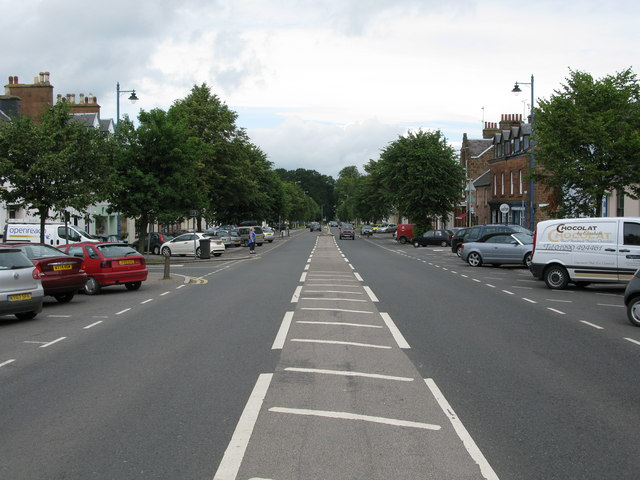
A76 in Thornhill

Starting at Kilmarnock in East Ayrshire, the A76 goes through or immediately by-passes Hurlford, Mauchline, Auchinleck, Cumnock, Pathhead and New Cumnock before entering Dumfries and Galloway and continuing through Kirkconnel, Sanquhar, Mennock, Enterkinfoot, Carronbridge, Thornhill, Closeburn, Kirkpatrick, Auldgirth and Holywood before terminating at Dumfries. For the majority of its length (the portion from New Cumnock to Dumfries) it follows the valley of the River Nith which also lends its name to the historic district of Nithsdale.

== Junction list ==
Council area	Location	mi	km	Destinations	Notes
Dumfries and Galloway	Dumfries	0.0	0.0	Galloway Street (A780) to A75 / A710 / A711 – Town centre, Stranraer, Solway Coast, Dalbeattie	Southern terminus
Dumfries and Galloway	Dumfries	0.8	1.3	A75 to M6 / M74 / A74(M) / A701 / A709 – Stranraer, Glasgow, Edinburgh, Glasgow, Lockerbie	To M74 signed northbound only, To M6 and A74(M) southbound only
Dumfries and Galloway	Thornhill	14.1	22.7	A702 south (Gill Road) – Penpont, Moniaive	Southern terminus of A702 concurrency
Dumfries and Galloway	Carronbridge	15.5	24.9	A702 north to M74 – Glasgow, Edinburgh, Durisdeer, Dalveen Pass, Elvanfoot	Northern terminus of A702 concurrency
East Ayrshire	Cumnock boundary	43.1	69.4	A70 (Ayr Road) to M74 – Ayr, Prestwick Airport, Cumnock, Edinburgh, Coylton, Ochiltree, Muirkirk	Prestwick Airport signed northbound only, To M74 southbound only
East Ayrshire	Kilmarnock	56.0	90.1	A71 (Riccarton Road) / A77 / A735 north (Queen's Drive) to A759 – Edinburgh, Irvine, Troon, Ayr, Glasgow, Kilmarnock	Northern terminus
1.000 mi = 1.609 km; 1.000 km = 0.621 mi: Concurrency terminus; Incomplete access
