= Pinwherry =

Village in Scotland

Coordinates: 55.1435°N 4.8305°W

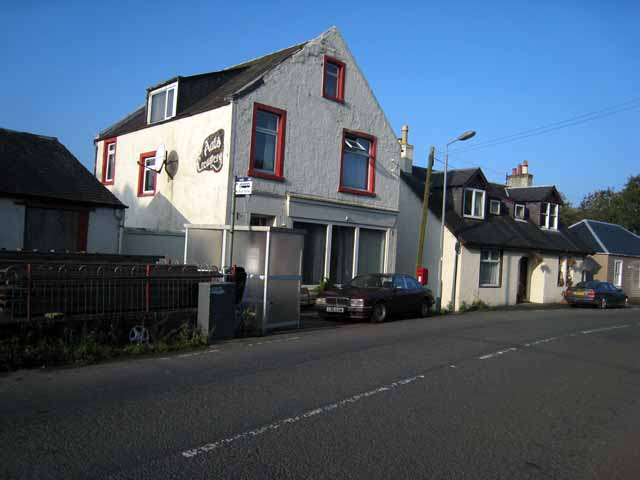
- The Auld Creamery

- Location within South Ayrshire
- Population: 100 (1961)
- Civil parish: Colmonell
- Council area: South Ayrshire
- Country: Scotland
- Sovereign state: United Kingdom
- Post town: GIRVAN
- Postcode district: KA26
- Police: Scotland
- Fire: Scottish
- Ambulance: Scottish

Pinwherry is a hamlet in the civil parish of Colmonell, in the council area of South Ayrshire, Scotland. It is 8 miles south of Girvan. In 1961 it had a population of 100. The hamlet contains the 16th century Pinwherry Castle.
