= Newton Loch, South Ayrshire =

Coordinates: 55°28′35.8″N 4°36′20.7″W

Newton Loch
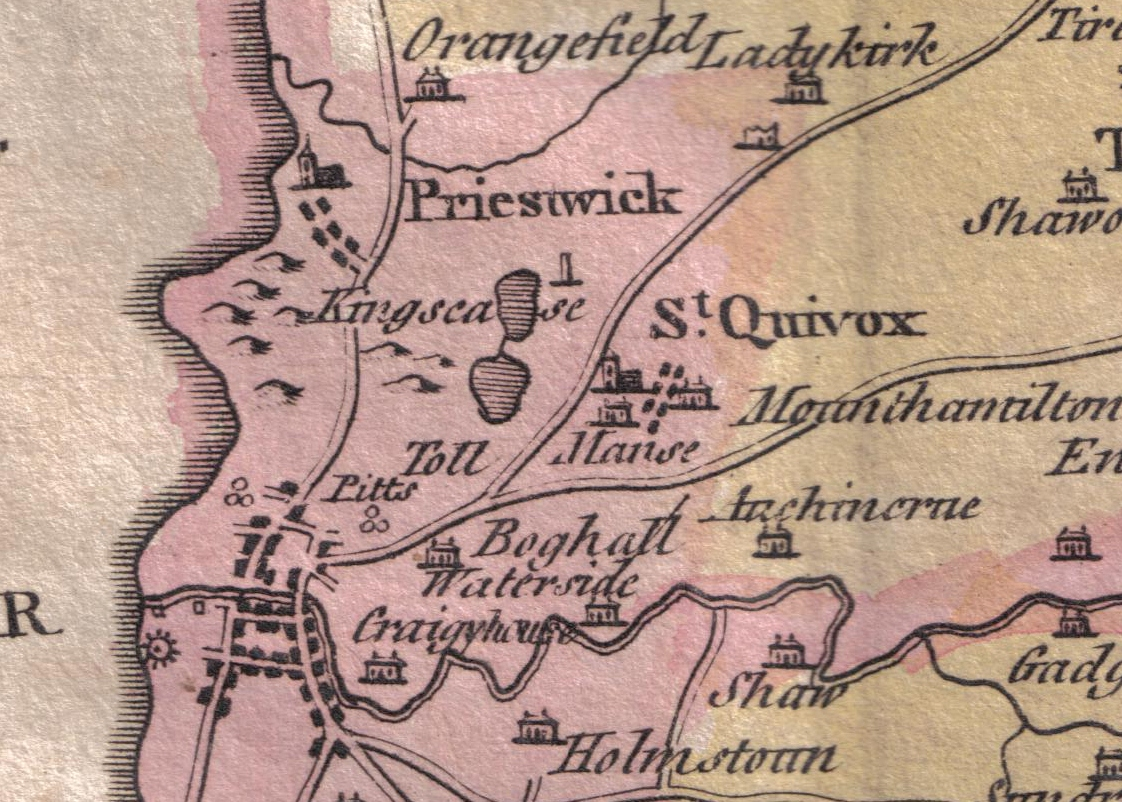
- Newton Loch on William Aiton's Map of 1811

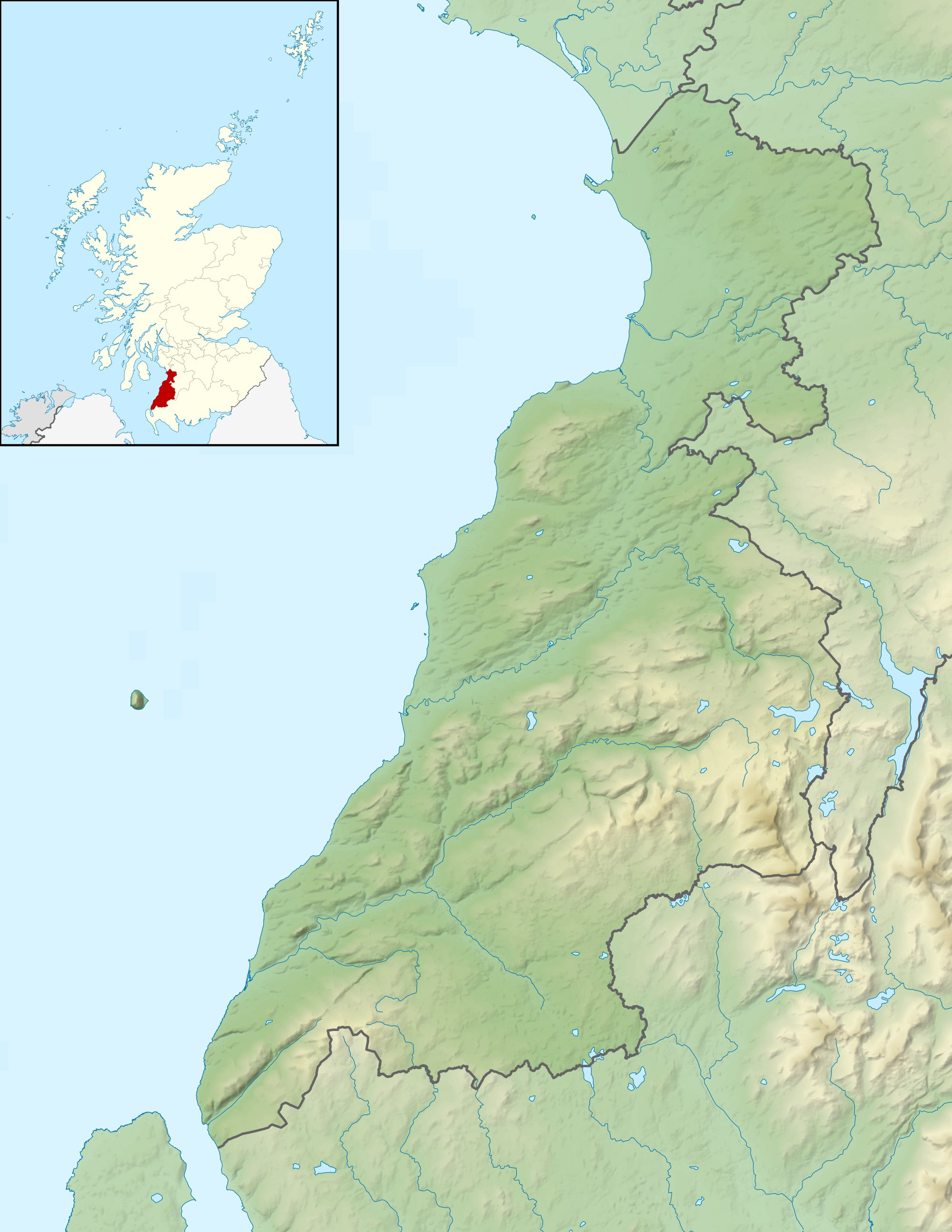
- Location within South Ayrshire
- Location: Newton-on-Ayr, South Ayrshire, Scotland
- Type: Drained freshwater loch
- Primary inflows: Sanquhar and Crook mosses, rainwater and surface drainage
- Primary outflows: Half Mile and Lochside Burns
- Catchment area: Newton and St Quivox Parish
- Basin countries: Scotland
- Settlements: Ayr

Newton Loch was situated in a low-lying area near Newton-on-Ayr, South Ayrshire, just south of the old South and West Sanquhar Farms. It is now (2016) only visible as remnant heath land and surface darkening in pastureland, situated mainly in the Parish of Ayr and partly in St Quivox, South Ayrshire, Scotland.

The original outflow of Newton Loch was directly into the sea at Newton-on-Ayr via the Half Mile Burn and another outflow was the lade that ran down the Newton-on-Ayr Main Street to the Newton Mill or Malt Mill that was located on the bank of the River Ayr near where the New Bridge of Ayr is located.

== History ==
As stated, Newton loch was a natural feature, sitting in a depression, probably created by glaciation and originally shaped somewhat like a map of Great Britain on a west-east orientation. The loch waters originally drained and the area is indeed still partly drained via the Half Mile Burn that now flows underground until it empties into the sea via a pipe at the Newton-on-Ayr promenade. A second outflow also once existed via a mill lade that ran down the Newton-on-Ayr Main Street to power the Newton or Malt Mill that was located near where Ayr 'New Bridge' is now located. The loch received its water supply from the Sanquhar and Crook mosses in addition to rainfall and land runoff.

Previous location of Newton Loch, South Ayrshire

== Newton or Malt Mill ==
The Newton or Malt Mill was located at the end of Main Street in Newton-on-Ayr on the banks of the River Ayr and was named thus because of its location and because just across the river once stood the ancient Malt Cross, one of Ayr's old market places and a site for the delivering of civic justice such as the burning of witches.

The mill lade ran fully exposed along the side of the Newton-on-Ayr Main Street and would have been a serious nuisance to pedestrians as well as horses, cattle, carts and other road traffic. In 1641 the Newton Burgh Court ruled that "..na personne or personnis sall wash at ye leid betwixt ye dam and ye mylne any foul claithis, puddings, lynnt, hydis or any other fulzie or pollutit thyngis qrby ye watter may be pollutit or fyillit be night or be day."

The mill was not shown on the 1818 map by Wood however it must have survived until at least 1832 because it is recorded that it was used as a shelter by people who took part in the riots linked to the First Reform Election. William Aiton's map of 1811 suggests that water may still have been available for the mill.

== The draining of Newton Loch ==
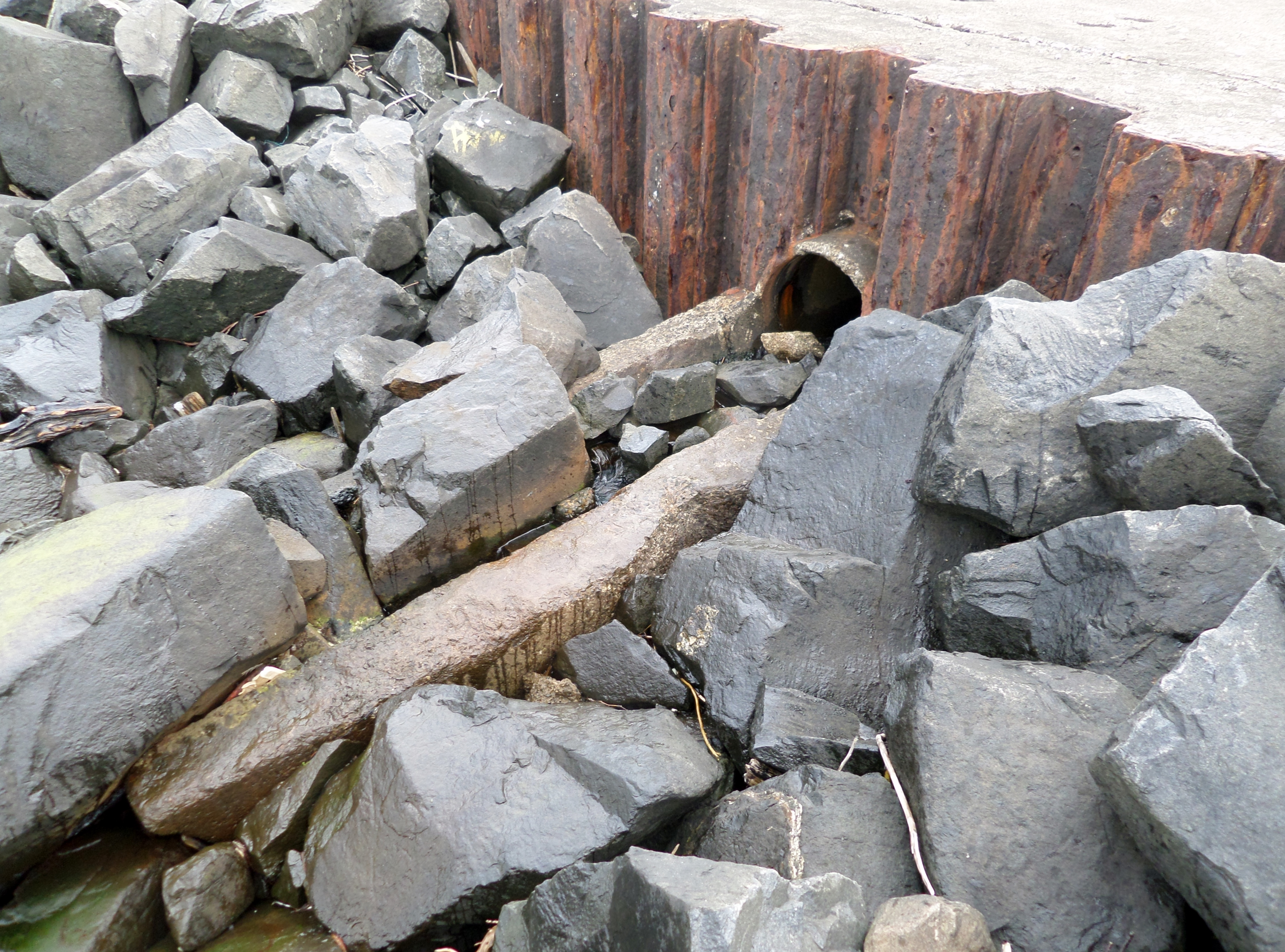
The outlet of the Half Mile Burn at Newton-on-Ayr promenade.

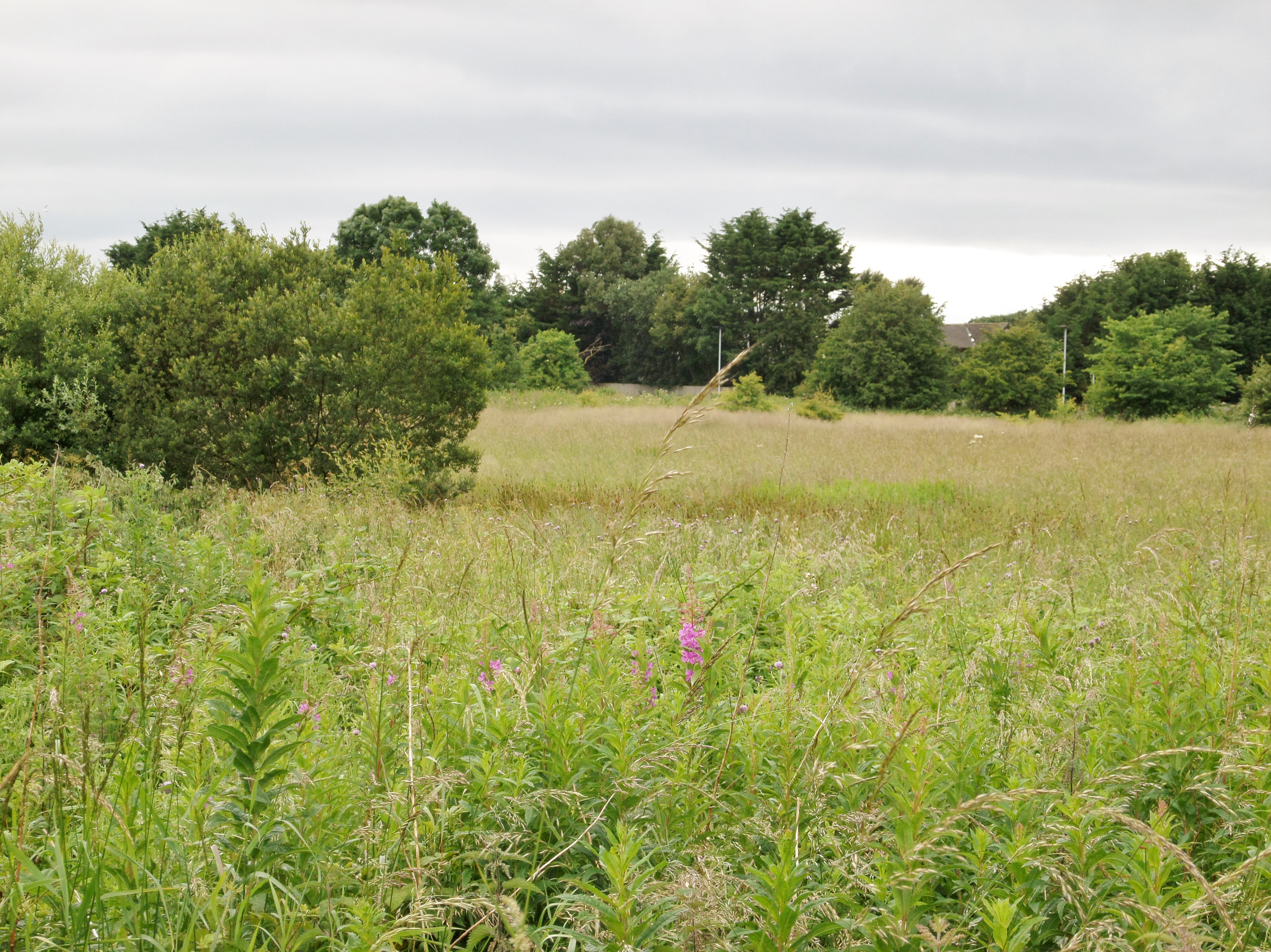
A remnant area of the old loch near Lochside Road.

The loch served a practical purpose when it provided a water supply for the Newton or Malt Mill, however the farmers found the loch's land to be very rich leading to it being progressively drained and neatly divided up as shown on Ordnance Survey maps. The land in 2016 still appears from aerial images to be formed of a black, loamy soil.

The First Moss Dails and the Second Moss Dails were the site of the loch, two of the five Dails or portions/shares of fields in Newton-on-Ayr. By 1747 only a small area of open water appears to be shown near Sanquhar Farm on Roys Map and the areas around are under cultivation. Andrew Armstrong's 1775 map indicates that no open water remained at all, however William Aiton's map of 1811 (see above) may indicate two open areas of water, one of which may be Newton Loch.

The 1895 Ordnance Survey map does show a small area of surviving open water and associated wetland near Heathfield Road and this was possibly the last remnant of the once fairly extensive Newton Loch that is show as a wetland without open water in circa 1947 situated to the south of Heathlands Hospital in an area now occupied by a housing estate.

== Placename evidence ==
Names such as the locality of Lochside, Lochside Road, Mosside, Crookmoss, Damside, Burnside, Newtonmor, Sanquhar (moss) and Heathfield recall the existence of the old loch, its outflows and inflows. 'Noltmire Road' is located near site of the old Heathfield Hospital and means 'boggy land where cattle graze'. Newton or Malt Mill, Burnboig and Boghall are recorded on older maps.

The three 'Sanquhar' farms may even hint at the presence of a crannog, typical of many of the old Ayrshire lochs as 'Sanquhar' is Gaelic for 'Old Fort' although it may simply refer to the old Newton Castle that was originally known as Sanquhar Castle.

=== Coal mining ===
The lade running down to the Newton or Malt Mill also carried water from a pumping station linked to a coal pit near the old loch, the water table in the locality being very close to the surface at the time. The loch having been drained by 1775 only drainage and water from such sources were available to power the mill.

=== Roads and railways ===
The old roads to Edinburgh and Glasgow ran through the area. The Glasgow and South Western Railway's 'Ayr Branch' and 'Ayr and Mauchline Branch' both run across the site of the old loch.

== Micro-history ==
The Half Mile Burn was once the Parliamentary boundary of the Burgh of Ayr.

== See also ==
- Lochlea, South Ayrshire - a nearby loch site
