= Doonfoot =

Coordinates: 55.43°N 4.65°W

Doonfoot: Scots: Doonfit
- Location within South Ayrshire
- OS grid reference: NS321190
- Council area: South Ayrshire
- Lieutenancy area: Ayrshire and Arran
- Country: Scotland
- Sovereign state: United Kingdom
- Post town: AYR
- Postcode district: KA7
- Dialling code: 01292
- Police: Scotland
- Fire: Scottish
- Ambulance: Scottish
- UK Parliament: Ayr, Carrick and Cumnock
- Scottish Parliament: Ayr

Doonfoot is a suburb in the south-west of Ayr, South Ayrshire.

== History ==
The area known as Doonfoot was incorporated as part of the town of Ayr when the former Burgh of Ayr's boundaries were expanded in 1935 to take in the former villages of Alloway and Whitletts.

In World War II, Greenan Road in Doonfoot was the location of Camp 14 for Axis prisoners-of-war. On 15 December 1944, 97 Italians escaped through a tunnel in the biggest breakout in UK history. They were all recaptured within a week.

In 2008 there were many new houses built in Doonfoot, expanding the population substantially.

== Politics ==
Since 1997 the area south of the Slaphouse Burn had been part of the Carrick, Cumnock & Doon Valley parliamentary constituency as opposed to the Ayr constituency. This also applied in the suburb of Alloway. Boundaries for UK Parliament constituencies were changed again in 2005, and Doonfoot was reunited with Ayr, but the division persisted in the Scottish Parliament. This was unpopular locally, and former Member of Parliament Phil Gallie challenged this in court by way of a judicial review but this was unsuccessful.

It was not until the first periodic review of Scottish parliamentary boundaries prior to the 2011 Scottish Parliament election that Doonfoot and Alloway were transferred back to the Ayr constituency along with Forehill, Masonhill and Kincaidston. This now forms part of the current political boundaries of the Ayr constituency which encompasses the electoral wards of Troon, Prestwick, Ayr North, Ayr East and Ayr West. At the same time, the electoral ward of Kyle was transferred from the former Ayr constituency to Carrick, Cumnock and Doon Valley.

At the 2003 South Ayrshire Council election the Doonfoot and Seafield electoral ward returned the largest Conservative vote in Scotland, with Conservative Councillor Cherry Young winning with 77.63% of the vote.

In the Scottish Parliament, the area is represented by SNP MSP Siobhian Brown as part of the Ayr constituency. At Westminster, Doonfoot is represented by Elaine Stewart of Scottish Labour as part of the Ayr, Carrick and Cumnock constituency.

== Features ==
Doonfoot contains a primary school, a play park, and a local convenience shop. There are also plans for a new retirement home and community centre to be built along the Dunure Road sometime in the near future.

Belleisle Park, one of the largest parks in Ayr, borders Doonfoot. It contains two municipal golf courses run by South Ayrshire Council, Seafield and Belleisle. The latter was designed by James Braid and has hosted the Scottish Open and a number of amateur tournaments. It is often cited as one of the best public courses in Scotland, after courses such as St Andrews and Carnoustie. The park also houses a number of animals, including deer and an aviary. There is also a walled garden with a sundial in the middle, and a large glasshouse which contains tropical plants.

Doonfoot extends westwards from the River Doon to the ruin of Greenan Castle, overlooking the coast. The island of Arran is clearly visible across the Firth of Clyde from many points throughout Doonfoot. The beach at Doonfoot is popular in summer but, like many beaches along the Ayrshire coast, has failed to meet European Union standards for cleanliness under the Blue Flag scheme.
