= KA postcode area =

Postcode area within the United Kingdom

Kilmarnock
- Postcode area
- Coordinates: 55.564°N 4.604°W
- Country: United Kingdom
- Postcode area: KA
- Postcode area name: Kilmarnock
- Post towns: 23
- Postcode districts: 30
- Postcode sectors: 87
- Postcodes (live): 11,605
- Postcodes (total): 14,127
- Statistics as at May 2020

The KA postcode area, also known as the Kilmarnock postcode area, is a group of 30 postcode districts in south-west Scotland, within 23 post towns. These cover East Ayrshire, North Ayrshire (including the Isle of Arran) and South Ayrshire.

Mail for the KA postcode area is processed at Glasgow Mail Centre, along with mail for the G, PA, ML and ZE postcode areas.

== Coverage ==
The approximate coverage of the postcode districts:

Postcode district	Post town	Coverage	Local authority area(s)
KA1	KILMARNOCK	Kilmarnock Centre, Bonnyton, Grange, Bellfield, Riccarton, Shortlees, Caprington, Hurlford	East Ayrshire
KA2	KILMARNOCK	Knockentiber, Crosshouse, Dundonald	East Ayrshire, South Ayrshire
KA3	KILMARNOCK	Longpark, Hillhead, Knockinlaw, Altonhill, Onthank, Beansburn, Southcraigs, New Farm Loch, Whinpark, Kilmaurs, Stewarton, Dunlop, Lugton, Fullwood, Kingsford, Fenwick, Crookedholm	East Ayrshire, North Ayrshire
KA4	GALSTON	Galston, Moscow	East Ayrshire
KA5	MAUCHLINE	Mauchline, Tarbolton, Catrine, Sorn	East Ayrshire, South Ayrshire
KA6	AYR	Mossblown, Annbank, Coylton, Dalrymple, Hollybush, Drongan, Rankinston, Patna, Waterside, Dalmellington, Bellsbank	South Ayrshire, East Ayrshire
KA7	AYR	Ayr Centre, Holmston, Forehill, Belmont, Castlehill, Kincaidston, Alloway, Doonfoot, Masonhill, Dunure	South Ayrshire
KA8	AYR	Braehead, Newton on Ayr, Woodfield, Heathfield, Whitletts, Lochside, Dalmilling, Craigie, Wallacetown	South Ayrshire
KA9	PRESTWICK	Prestwick, Monkton	South Ayrshire
KA10	TROON	Troon, Barassie, Muirhead, Loans	South Ayrshire
KA11	IRVINE	Perceton, Lawthorn, Girdle Toll, Stanecastle, Bourtreehill, Broomlands, Dreghorn, Springside	North Ayrshire
KA12	IRVINE	Irvine Centre, Fullarton, Stanecastle	North Ayrshire
KA13	KILWINNING	Kilwinning	North Ayrshire
KA14	BEITH	Beith, Glengarnock	North Ayrshire
KA15	BEITH	Beith, Burnhouse	North Ayrshire
KA16	NEWMILNS	Newmilns, Greenholm	East Ayrshire
KA17	DARVEL	Darvel	East Ayrshire
KA18	CUMNOCK	Cumnock, Auchinleck, Ochiltree, New Cumnock, Muirkirk, Smallburn, Lugar, Logan	East Ayrshire
KA19	MAYBOLE	Maybole, Crosshill, Straiton, Kirkoswald	South Ayrshire
KA20	STEVENSTON	Stevenston	North Ayrshire
KA21	SALTCOATS	Saltcoats	North Ayrshire
KA22	ARDROSSAN	Ardrossan, Whitlees, Chapelhill	North Ayrshire
KA23	WEST KILBRIDE	West Kilbride	North Ayrshire
KA24	DALRY	Dalry, Drakemyre	North Ayrshire
KA25	KILBIRNIE	Kilbirnie	North Ayrshire
KA26	GIRVAN	Girvan, Turnberry, Dailly, Old Dailly, Ballantrae, Colmonell, Barrhill	South Ayrshire
KA27	ISLE OF ARRAN	Brodick, Lochranza, Machrie, Kilmory, Kildonan, Holy Island	North Ayrshire
KA28	ISLE OF CUMBRAE	Millport, Little Cumbrae	North Ayrshire
KA29	LARGS	Largs, Glenside, Fairlie, Kelburn	North Ayrshire
KA30	LARGS	Largs	North Ayrshire

== Map ==
KA postcode area map, showing postcode districts in red and post towns in grey text, with links to nearby DG, G, ML and PA postcode areas.

== See also ==
- Postcode Address File
- List of postcode areas in the United Kingdom
