= Seafield, Ayr =

Coordinates: 55.449°N 4.643°W

Seafield
- Location within South Ayrshire
- OS grid reference: NS329203
- Council area: South Ayrshire
- Lieutenancy area: Ayrshire and Arran
- Country: Scotland
- Sovereign state: United Kingdom
- Post town: AYR
- Postcode district: KA7
- Dialling code: 01292
- Police: Scotland
- Fire: Scottish
- Ambulance: Scottish
- UK Parliament: Ayr, Carrick and Cumnock
- Scottish Parliament: Ayr

Seafield is a southern district of Ayr, Scotland. A major landmark in the area is the former Seafield Children's Hospital, which closed in 1991. The area is also home to a large golf course.
