= Dedridge =

Area in Livingston, West Lothian, Scotland

Coordinates: 55.879°N 3.517°W

Dedridge: Scottish Gaelic: An Druim Marbh; Scots: Deidrigg
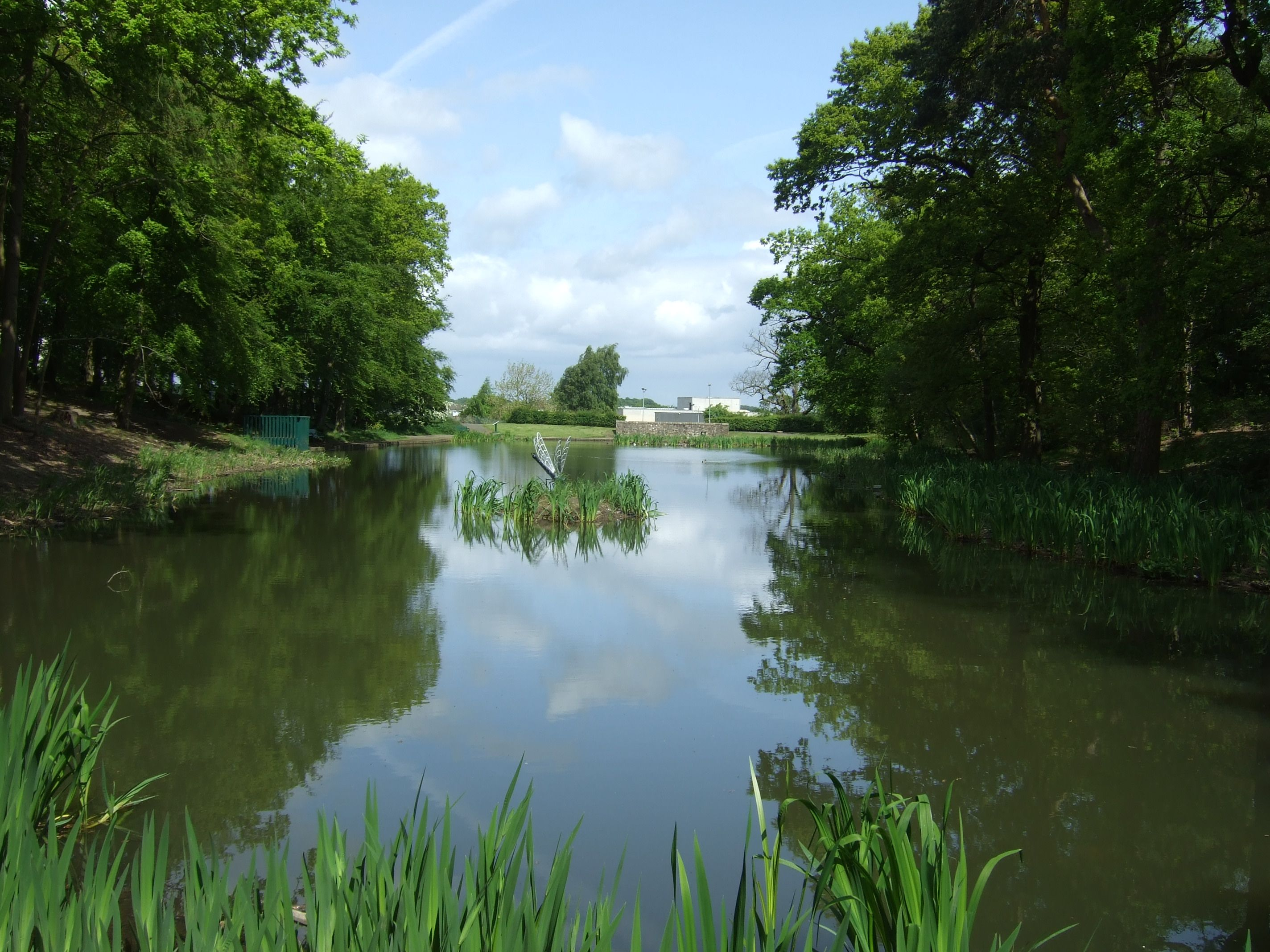
- Dedridge Pond

- Location within West Lothian
- Council area: West Lothian
- Lieutenancy area: West Lothian
- Country: Scotland
- Sovereign state: United Kingdom
- Post town: LIVINGSTON
- Postcode district: EH
- Dialling code: 01506
- Police: Scotland
- Fire: Scottish
- Ambulance: Scottish
- UK Parliament: Livingston
- Scottish Parliament: Almond Valley

Dedridge is an area in the town of Livingston in West Lothian, Scotland. It is located in the south of the town, just south of the Almondvale area, and north of the Murieston area.

The area's streets are named after parts, events or characters from the plays of Sir Walter Scott; with the suffix 'Rise' being appended to give street names such as Clement Rise, Crusader Rise and Ivanhoe Rise.

== Community information ==
There are two community centres in Dedridge: the Lanthorn (Kenilworth Rise) and Crofthead Farm (Templar Rise). There is a public library in the Lanthorn. Dedridge Health Centre is in Nigel Rise and has a dental practice attached.

There are two ponds in the area: Dedridge Pond, just south of Kenilworth Rise, and one adjacent to Staunton Rise.

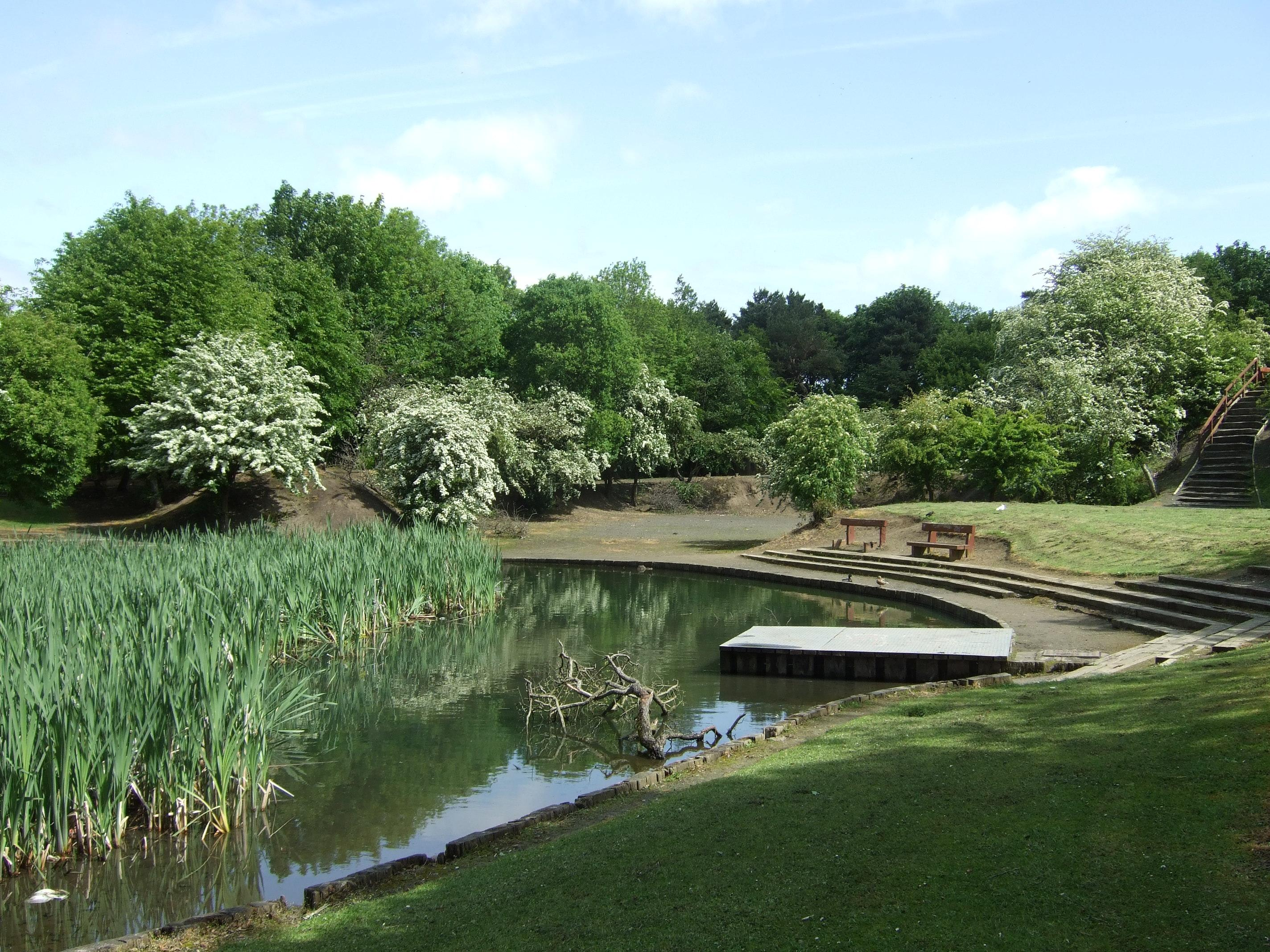
Staunton / The Froggy looking east

Dedridge Pond and the surrounding Dedridge Burn Plantation area are cared for by Dedridge Environment Ecology Project. Dedridge Pond has artwork in the form of a damselfly sculpture.

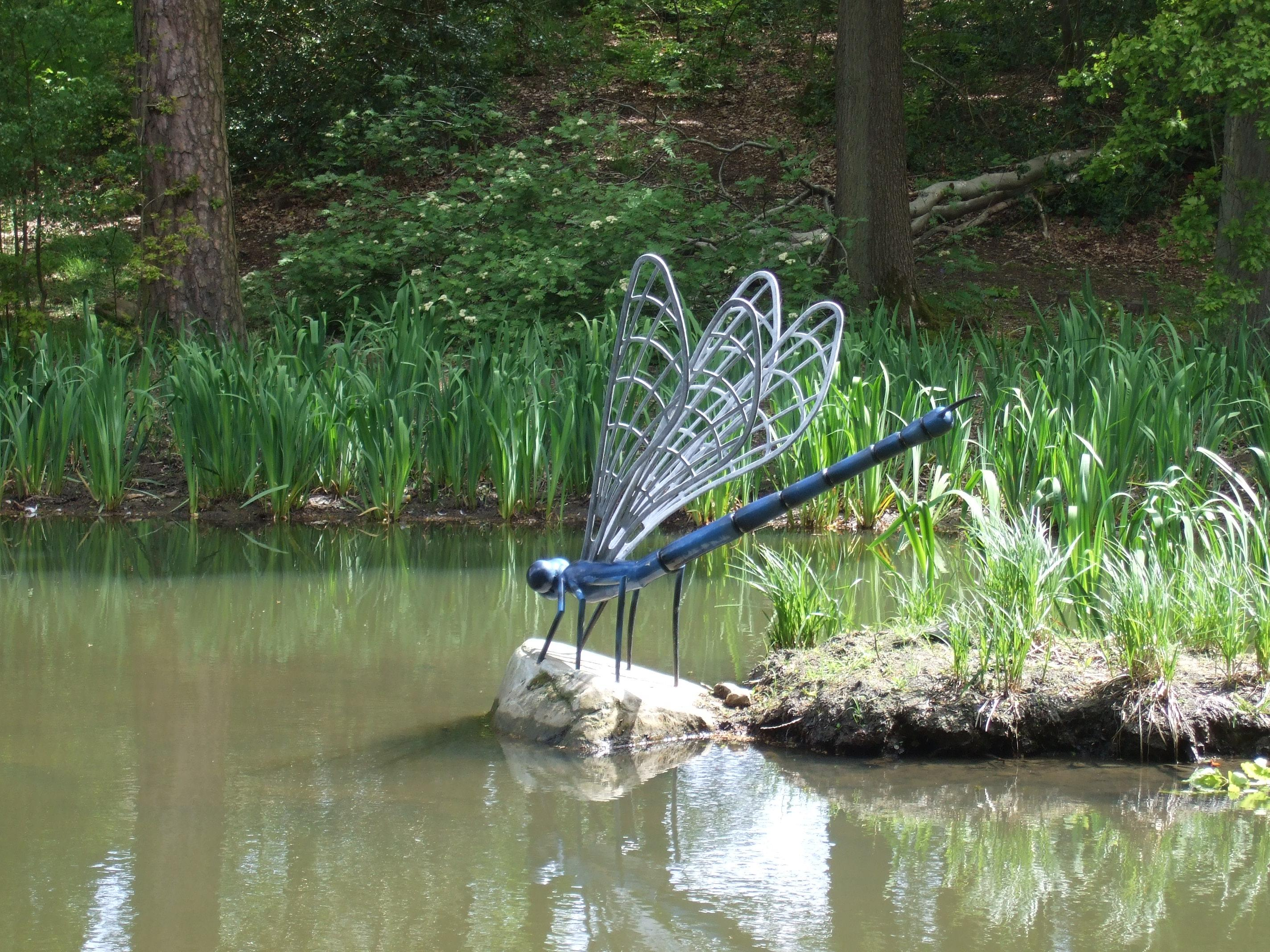
Damselfly artwork at Dedridge Pond

Most housing in Dedridge is terraced houses built by Livingston Development Corporation. The original landscaping of Dedridge made an effort to break up housing areas with natural features, and there are a number of small woodland areas cared for by the Woodland Trust.

A small newsletter (Dedridge Grapevine) with local news stories is circulated in Dedridge with 10 issues per year, edited by the same person for more than 30 years.

There are three care homes in Dedridge, the first is Crusader Court located in Crusader Rise, the second is Woodlands Care Home located in Quentin Rise and the last Limecroft which is located within Templar Rise.
