= Waterside, East Ayrshire =

Coordinates: 55.661°N 4.408°W

Waterside
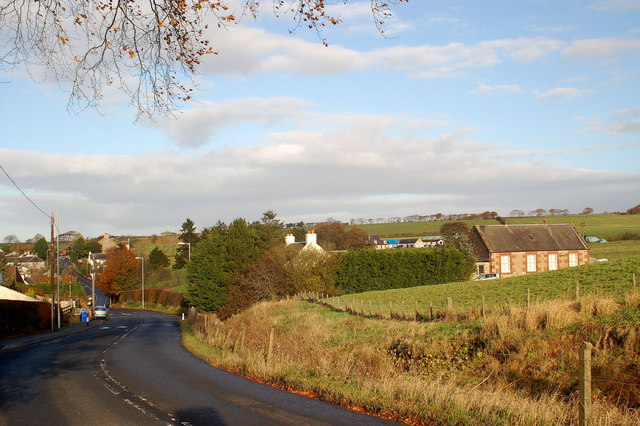
- Waterside village showing the old 1823 school to the right

- Location within East Ayrshire
- Population: 141 (Census 2001)
- Language: English
- OS grid reference: NS485435
- Council area: East Ayrshire
- Lieutenancy area: Ayrshire and Arran
- Country: Scotland
- Sovereign state: United Kingdom
- Post town: Kilmarnock
- Postcode district: KA3
- Dialling code: 01560
- Police: Scotland
- Fire: Scottish
- Ambulance: Scottish
- UK Parliament: Kilmarnock and Loudoun
- Scottish Parliament: Kilmarnock and Irvine Valley

Waterside is a village in East Ayrshire, Scotland, situated about five miles north of Galston on the Craufurdland Water in the Parish of Fenwick. It lies a few miles north of Moscow on the A719 and had a population of 141 in the Census of 2001.

== History ==
=== The mill ===
Previously known as Hareshaw Mill this old carding mill dates from 1784 and has gone through a number of uses, even hosting a bookshop at one point. The 1856 OS map records the location of the weir, sluice, and lade that diverted and carried water to the mill wheel from the Craufurdland Water. By 1910 the OS maps show that the wollen mill was no longer in use as a mill. Part of the mill became a private dwelling.

Although built as a carding mill, Waterside Mill was later also used for weaving. The wheelpit of the mill still survives. In 1910 the building became a creamery, and then a dairy under the management of the Fenwick Farming Co-operative. Waterside village grew up because of the jobs created by the mill.

=== The village and district ===
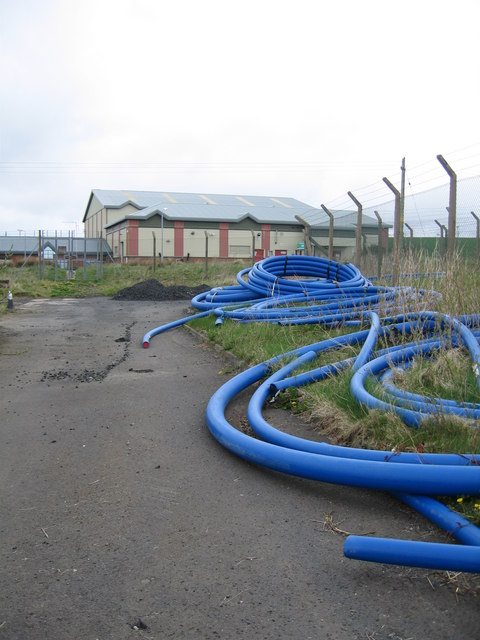
Amlaird water treatment plant.

The flat topped bungalows at 28 to 30 Main Street were designed by Sam Brunton and built using new prefabrication techniques in 1943 from gyproc. Hareshawmuir Lodge was originally built as an Edwardian shooting lodge, however it has been much modified. It was the property of the Earl of Glasgow in 1867 and had been so since 1687. The tract of land in this areas was also known as Harelaw or Hartshaw. Amlaird lies on the A719 and is a water filtration plant that treats water from the Lochgoin Reservoir, created in 1910 by the Kilmarnock Corporation from the ancient Loch Goyne.

The OS map of 1856 shows that whinstone and sandstone quarries were located downstream of the mill. The old smithy, now a private dwelling, lies near the Brunton bungalows. The village had a post office located at the site of the schoolhouse building that survives today as a private dwelling. In 1856 the school is shown as being located at the east side of the crossroads between Laigh and High Arness farms. In 1895 the school is shown on the OS map as being close to the old post office at the site of the present community centre. The present community centre was built as a school in 1823 following public subscription and the permission of George, 4th Earl of Glasgow.

The 1895 OS map shows that the post office was at this time located on the west side of the main street, a few houses up from Waterside Bridge.

By 1910 the OS maps show that a creamery had been established near the old woolen mill. In 1968 the primary school is still recorded, as is the creamery and a sawmill. The primary school is still shown in the 1980s, however the creamery is not recorded. The sawmill closed and the site is now a small housing estate.

=== Micro-history ===
On the south side of the Hareshawmuir Water are the remains of a small fort, lying close to the farm of Langdyke. It was surrounded by a turf and stone wall and sits at the point where a whin dyke crosses the burn.

Dunton Cove is a cave on the east bank of the Craufurdland Water just below the confluence of the Dunton and Calf Fauld waters which was used as a temporary hiding place in the 17th century, the time of the Covenanters known as the 'Killing Times'.

The Carlin Stone, a glacial erratic boulder, lies beside the Hareshawmuir Water near Craigends.

Between 1905 and 1928 records were kept at Hareshawmuir (600 ft above sea level) of the arrival of summer migrants such as wheatear, swallow, cuckoo, corncrake, dunlin, spotted flycatcher, etc.
