= Belmont, Ayr =

Coordinates: 55.450°N 4.623°W

Belmont
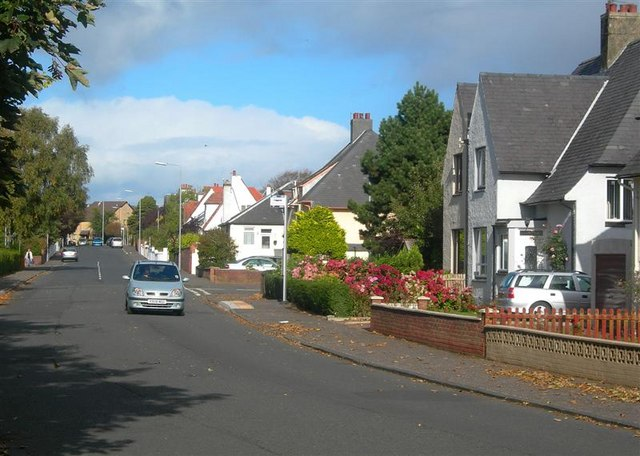
- Belmont Avenue

- Location within South Ayrshire
- OS grid reference: NS342205
- Council area: South Ayrshire
- Lieutenancy area: Ayrshire and Arran
- Country: Scotland
- Sovereign state: United Kingdom
- Post town: AYR
- Postcode district: KA7
- Dialling code: 01292
- Police: Scotland
- Fire: Scottish
- Ambulance: Scottish
- UK Parliament: Ayr, Carrick and Cumnock
- Scottish Parliament: Ayr

Belmont is an area within the south of the town of Ayr, South Ayrshire, Scotland, UK. It was developed for local authority housing before the outbreak of World War Two in 1939, around Belmont Avenue, Chalmers Avenue and Morton Road. In the late 1950s, work commenced on a much larger council housing development at South Belmont, in an area enclosed by Peggieshill Road, Fenwickland Avenue, Burnbank Road and Dalmellington Road. The main services within the Belmont area are Belmont Academy, which was originally built in 1960 on the site of the former Belmont House which was the home of the Mathie-Morton family, Yeomanry House on Chalmers Road, St Paul's R.C. Church and a number of shops dotted around the area, including a Morrisons supermarket in the north adjacent to Castlehill Road. St Paul's Church was built in 1967 and was designed by architect John Frederick Torry.

== Services ==
The area is bound by Annfield Burn, the A713 and railway line. It is one of the most diverse parts of Ayr, containing a mixture of affluent suburban areas and deprived council estates. Old Belmont (north of Belmont Road) is mostly made up of affluent suburban areas, with council housing confined beyond Meadowpark, Chalmers Road and Belmont Road. Most suburban areas are found along and north of Chalmers Road and in the Meadowpark and Nursery areas. Belmont Road is lined with bungalows. With the exception of the Nursery area, South Belmont is made up entirely of council housing. It has much higher deprivation in contrast to Old Belmont, and as such shares similar characteristics to neighbouring Kincaidston located south of Annfield Burn.

== See also ==
- List of places in South Ayrshire
