= Turnberry, South Ayrshire =

Coordinates: 55.310879°N 4.8325950°W

Turnberry
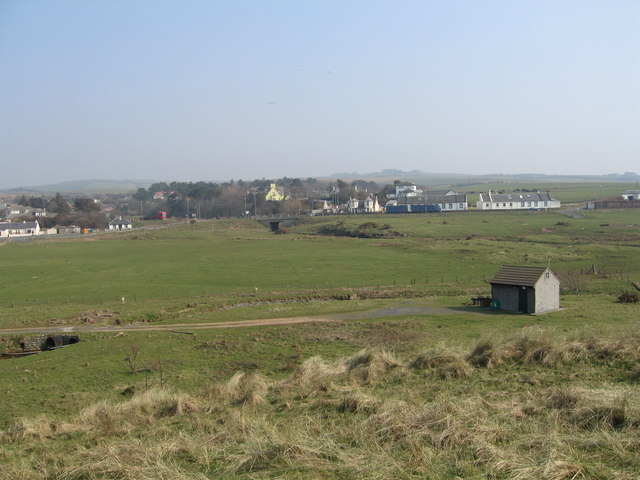

- Location within South Ayrshire
- Civil parish: Kirkoswald
- Council area: South Ayrshire
- Country: Scotland
- Sovereign state: United Kingdom
- Post town: GIRVAN
- Postcode district: KA26

Turnberry is a village 6 miles (9.7 km) north of Girvan, in the civil parish of Kirkoswald, in the council area of South Ayrshire, Scotland. It has a golf resort called Turnberry which has three courses. In 1991 it had a population of 149.

== History ==
The name "Turnberry" means "circular place".

In July 2025, U.S. President Trump visited Turnberry on an official visit and golf outing. The trip included Trump's promotion of his second Scottish golf course, Trump Turnberry, where he played a round of golf on 26 July.
