= Moscow, East Ayrshire =

Settlement near Kilmarnock in Scotland

Coordinates: 55.633°N 4.404°W

Moscow
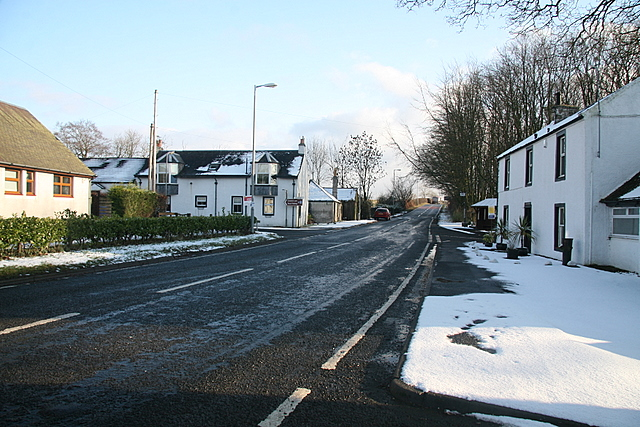
- A719 road passing through Moscow

- Location within East Ayrshire
- Population: 141 (Census 2001)
- Language: English
- OS grid reference: NS487404
- Council area: East Ayrshire
- Lieutenancy area: Ayrshire and Arran
- Country: Scotland
- Sovereign state: United Kingdom
- Post town: Galston
- Postcode district: KA4
- Dialling code: 01560
- Police: Scotland
- Fire: Scottish
- Ambulance: Scottish
- UK Parliament: Kilmarnock and Loudoun
- Scottish Parliament: Kilmarnock and Irvine Valley

Moscow is a hamlet in East Ayrshire in Scotland. It is on the A719 road some 4 miles (6 kilometres) east of Kilmarnock. In 2006 its population was reported as 118. It is represented in the "Galston West and Hurlford North" ward of East Ayrshire Council.

== Name ==
The name is thought to be a corruption of "Moss-hall" or "Moss-haw" but its spelling was amended in 1812 to mark Napoleon's retreat from Moscow. The name may also be of Brittonic origin, and derived from the words maɣes, "field" and coll, "hazel" (Welsh maes-coll). A stream called the Volga Burn flows through the village. Locally the land and forest around Cowans Law to the north-west is referred to as 'Little Russia'.

The hamlet also shares the same latitude (55° North) as the Russian city. The village is well known in Russia for its name. Following the 2022 Russian invasion of Ukraine, some locals considered trying to rename the village.

== History ==
Walter Emery of the Kilmarnock Glenfield Ramblers had researched the names Moscow, Volga and Ruschaw in 1933. The Ordnance Survey (OS) notified him that the local residents had authorised the name 'Moscow' and that the name appears on Aitken's 1829 map, the valuation role, the Grougar Estate map, and Johnson's 1828 County map. The Ordnance Survey also referred to a local tradition that the name was derived from the burning of Moscow in Russia in 1812, the first house in Moscow in Ayrshire having been built at about that time. Ayr County Council suggested that "during the Crimean war there were various refugees and prisoners located in the neighbourhood, and it was then that Russian names were given to various places."

Shaw records that "a generation ago Russian prisoners of war were located between Galston and Fenwick, at a place called Moscow".

In the Spring of 1884 a Mr. Rankin was found murdered in a gruesome fashion at his lonely cottage near Moscow. He was said to be well-to-do, however although no clues were found, theft was considered to be the motive; the guilty party was never brought to justice. Mr. McNabb, a retired police officer, related that in his opinion the murder was carried out by a somnambulist who was therefore unaware of the deed. He had never ventured this opinion officially for fear of being laughed out of the force.

== Micro-history ==
In 2008 a personal airstrip was established in a field near the village for light aircraft.

The village is referenced in the song "Hayfever" by The Trash Can Sinatras on their album I've Seen Everything: "...Moscow's in Ayrshire, what's the problem?"

Moscow is the subject of a song by Scottish artist Zuper Rookie which details a story of a hitchhiker from the hamlet.

== See also ==
- River Irvine - tributaries listed.
