= European route E5 in the United Kingdom =

The European route E5 in the United Kingdom is a series of roads, part of the International E-road network, running from western Scotland to southern England. It crosses afterwards the English Channel to France and ends in Spain eventually. The route is not signposted in the United Kingdom.

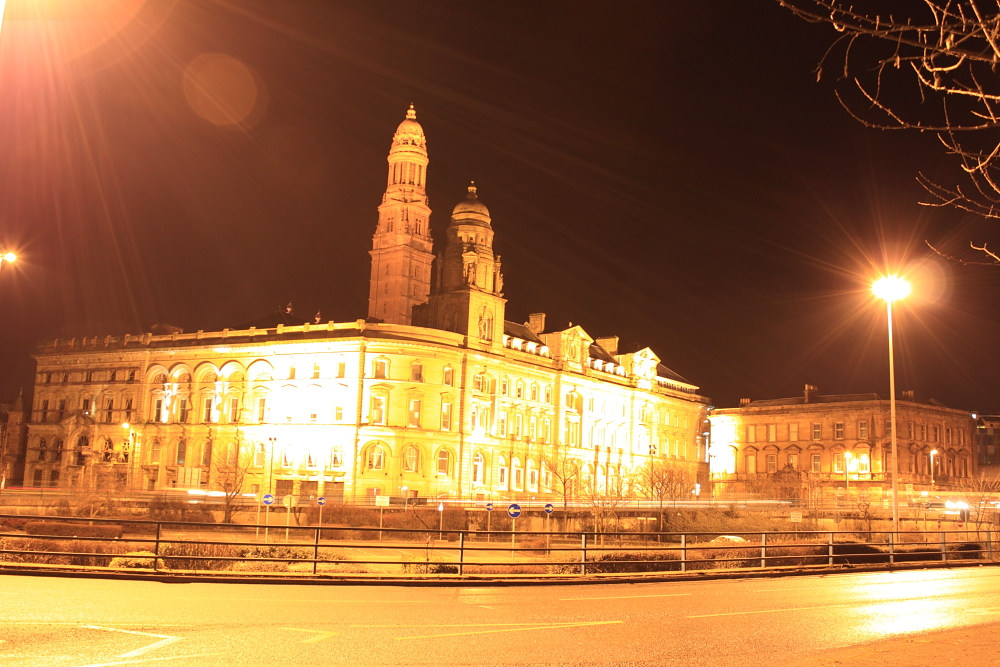
The start of E5 at Greenock Municipal Buildings

== Route ==
The E5 starts in the town of Greenock in western Scotland, where it follows the A8 road until Bishopton. There it transforms into the M8 motorway, the busiest motorway in Scotland, and later the M74 motorway, where it passes the largest Scottish city Glasgow. The M74 motorway heads southeast through the Southern Uplands. At the border with England, the classification changes from A74(M) to the M6 motorway, which continues south passing major cities like Carlisle, Preston, Liverpool, Manchester, Stoke-on-Trent and ends in Birmingham. Around Birmingham, the E5 shortly uses the M42 before connecting on the M40 towards London. After passing Warwick the E5 ends at exit 9 just north of Oxford. Here the E5 leaves the highway and follows the A34 road passing Oxford and Newbury, ending in Winchester. Here it connects on the last part: the M3 motorway, ending in Southampton. Afterwards it uses a non-existing ferry to cross the English Channel to Le Havre, France. The E5 covers a distance of 721 km (448 mi) in the United Kingdom.

== Detailed route ==
Region	National road number	Section	Junction	Northbound destinations	Southbound destinations
(United Kingdom) Scotland Inverclyde	A8 road	Greenock – Langbank	Greenock Port Glasgow	Gourock Greenock	Paisley Glasgow
Renfrewshire	M8 motorway	Langbank – Paisley	31 A8 Bishopton 30 M898 Erskine, Dumbarton, Fort William Bishopton (only northbound) 29 A726, A737 Glasgow Airport, Irvine, Paisley, Johnstone	Gourock Greenock	Paisley Glasgow
Renfrewshire	M8 motorway	Paisley – Glasgow	28 Glasgow Airport (only northbound) 27 A741 Renfrew, Paisley 26 A736 Hillington, Braehead 25A A736, A8 Renfrew, Hillington, Braehead	Greenock Paisley	Glasgow
Glasgow City	M8 motorway	Glasgow	25 A739 Clyde Tunnel, QEUH & RHC Hospitals 24 Govan 23 B768 Ibrox (only northbound) 22 M74, M77, A8, E16 Glasgow-Center, Edinburgh, Carlisle, Kilmarnock, Tradeston 21 M8 W, M77 Kinning Park, Newton Mearns, Kilmarnock, Prestwick, Ayr (only southbound)	Greenock Paisley	Carlisle
Glasgow City	M74 motorway	Glasgow	1 A8 Glasgow-Center, Tradeston 1A A728, A730 Polmadie, Rutherglen	Glasgow	Carlisle
South Lanarkshire	M74 motorway	Rutherglen	2 A724 Rutherglen, Cambuslang	Glasgow	Carlisle
Glasgow City	M74 motorway	Glasgow	2A A74 Tollcross, Cambuslang 3 A763, B765 Shettleston, Cambuslang (only northbound) 3A A721 Tannochside, Uddingston 4 M73, M8, M80 Edinburgh, Stirling, Coatbridge, Dunfermline, Cumbernauld	Glasgow	Carlisle
South Lanarkshire	M74 motorway	Glasgow – Abington	Bothwell services (only southbound) 5 A725 East Kilbride, Coatbridge, Bellshill, Blantyre, Newton Mearns Hamilton services (only northbound) 6 A723 Hamilton, Wishaw, Motherwell 7 Larkhall, Lanark, Carluke (only southbound) 8 A71 Edinburgh, Kilmarnock, Wishaw, Stonehouse 9 B7078 Kirkmuirhill, Blackwood, Lesmahagow, Coalburn (only southbound) 10 B7078 Kirkmuirhill, Blackwood, Lesmahagow, Coalburn (only northbound) 11 B7078, A70 Edinburgh, Ayr, Douglas, Rigside (only southbound) 12 B7078, A70 Edinburgh, Ayr, Douglas, Rigside (only northbound) 13 A702 Edinburgh, Lanark, Biggar, Abington	Glasgow	Carlisle
South Lanarkshire	A74(M) motorway	Abington – Beattock	14 A702, A76 Crawford, Thornhill	Glasgow	Carlisle
Dumfries and Galloway	A74(M) motorway	Beattock – Gretna	15 A701, A708 Beattock, Moffat, Dumfries, Selkirk 16 B7076 Johnstonebridge, Annandale Water services 17 B7068, A709 Lockerbie, Dumfries, Langholm, Lochmaben 18 B723, A709 Lockerbie, Dumfries, Langholm, Lochmaben (only northbound) 19 B7076 Ecclefechan, Langholm 20 B722, B7076 Eaglesfield, Annan, Kirtlebridge, Langholm 21 B6357, B7076 Canonbie, Kirkpatrick-Fleming Gretna Green services 22 A75, A6071, B7076, E18 Gretna Green, Gretna, Longtown, Dumfries, Annan, Stranraer	Glasgow	Carlisle
(United Kingdom) England Cumbria	M6 motorway	Gretna – Carlisle	45 B7076, A6071 Gretna, Longtown (only northbound) Todhills Rest Area 44 A7, A689 Carlisle North, Edinburgh, Workington, Whitehaven, Newcastle upon Tyne 43 A69, E18 Carlisle, Hexham, Newcastle upon Tyne	Glasgow	Carlisle
(United Kingdom) England Cumbria	M6 motorway	Carlisle – Burton-in-Kendal	42 A6 Carlisle South, Wetheral, Dalston Southwaite Services 41 B5305 Wigton, Lazonby 40 A66 Penrith, Keswick, Brough, Workington, Lake District National Park 39 A6 Shap, Kendal Tebay Services 38 A685 Kendal, Brough, Kirkby Stephen 37 A684 Kendal, Sedbergh, Barrow-in-Furness, Keswick, Lake District National Park, Yorkshire Dales National Park Killington Lake Services (only southbound) 36 A65, A590 Kendal, Kirkby Lonsdale, Skipton, Leeds, Barrow-in-Furness Burton-in-Kendal Services (only northbound)	Glasgow Carlisle	Manchester Liverpool Lancaster
Lancashire	M6 motorway	Burton-in-Kendal – Lancaster	35 A6, A601(M) Carnforth, Bolton-le-Sands, Warton, Over Kellet 34 A683 Lancaster, Morecambe, Heysham, Halton, Caton	Glasgow Carlisle	Manchester Liverpool Lancaster
Lancashire	M6 motorway	Lancaster – Preston	33 A6 Garstang, Fleetwood, Galgate, University of Lancaster Lancaster Service Area 32 M55 Preston North, Blackpool, Fulwood, Fleetwood, Lytham St Annes, Kirkham 31 A59 Preston Center, Clitheroe, Blackburn, Burnley 30 M61, M62, M65 Manchester, Leeds, Blackburn, Burnley, Bolton	Glasgow Lancaster	Manchester Liverpool Preston
Lancashire	M6 motorway	Preston – Standish	29 M65 Blackburn, Burnley, Bamber Bridge, Southport 28 B5256 Leyland Charnock Richard Services 27 A5209 Wigan, Parbold, Burscough, Ormskirk, Standish	Glasgow Preston	Birmingham Liverpool Warrington
Greater Manchester	M6 motorway	Standish – Ashton-in-Makerfield	26 M58 Wigan, Liverpool North, Bolton, Southport, Skelmersdale 25 A49 Wigan (only northbound) 24 A58 St Helens, Ashton-in-Makerfield (only southbound)	Glasgow Preston	Birmingham Liverpool Warrington
Merseyside	M6 motorway	Ashton-in-Makerfield – Warrington	23 A580 Liverpool, Manchester, Newton-le-Willows, St Helens, Golborne, Haydock 22 A49 Warrington North, Golborne	Glasgow Preston	Birmingham Liverpool Warrington
Warrington	M6 motorway	Warrington	21A M62 Manchester, Leeds, Bolton, Liverpool 21 A57 Warrington Center, Irlam, Manchester 20 A50, B5158 Warrington South, Macclesfield, Lymm (only northbound)	Manchester Liverpool	Birmingham Stoke-on-Trent
Cheshire East	M6 motorway	Warrington – Knutsford	20(a) M56 Manchester S, Stockport, Sheffield, Runcorn, Chester, Colwyn Bay, Manchester Airport, North Wales 19 A556 Northwich, Macclesfield, Knutsford Knutsford Services	Manchester Liverpool	Birmingham Stoke-on-Trent
Cheshire West and Chester	M6 motorway	Knutsford – Holmes Chapel	/	Manchester Liverpool	Birmingham Stoke-on-Trent
Cheshire East	M6 motorway	Holmes Chapel – Stoke-on-Trent	18 A54 Chester, Northwich, Middlewich, Holmes Chapel, Winsford, Congleton 17 A534 Sandbach, Congleton, Crewe North Sandbach services 16 A500 Crewe South, Nantwich, Alsager, Stoke-on-Trent North, Kidsgrove, Newcastle-under-Lyme	Manchester Liverpool	Birmingham Stoke-on-Trent
Staffordshire	M6 motorway	Stoke-on-Trent – Cannock	Keele services 15 A500, A50 Stoke-on-Trent South, Derby, Nottingham, Shrewsbury, Stone Stafford services 14 A34 Stafford North, Eccleshall, Newport, Telford 13 A449 Stafford South, Penkridge, Rugeley 12 A5 M54 Cannock, Telford, Shrewsbury, Wolverhampton, North Wales M6 Birmingham, Wolverhampton, Bristol, Coventry, Nottingham, Leicester, London (only southbound)	Manchester Liverpool Stoke-on-Trent	Birmingham
West Midlands	M6 motorway	Birmingham	11 A460, M6, M54 Wolverhampton, Cannock Hilton Park services M54, A5 Wolverhampton, Telford, Shrewsbury, North and Mid Wales (only northbound) 10 A454 Wolverhampton Central & East, Walsall, Willenhall 9 A461 Walsall, Wednesbury, Darlaston, Dudley 8 M5 Birmingham West & South, West Bromwich, Worcester, Bristol 7 A34 Birmingham North, Walsall 6 A38(M), A38 Birmingham Center, East & Northeast, Sutton Coldfield, Lichfield 5 A452 Birmingham East, Sutton Coldfield (only northbound) 4A M42, M6 Toll, M1, M5, M40, E24 Tamworth, Nottingham, Birmingham South, London (only southbound) 4/7 M42, A446 Birmingham East, Coventry South & West, London, Bristol	Manchester Liverpool Stoke-on-Trent	London Oxford
West Midlands	M42 motorway	Birmingham	6 A45 Birmingham East, Birmingham Airport, Coventry 5 A41 Birmingham Southeast, Solihull 4 A34 Birmingham Southeast, Solihull, Shirley	Manchester Liverpool Stoke-on-Trent	London Oxford
Warwickshire	M42 motorway	Birmingham	M40 Birmingham South, London, Oxford, Worcester, Warwick, Stratford-upon-Avon	Manchester Liverpool Stoke-on-Trent	London Oxford
Warwickshire	M40 motorway	Birmingham – Banbury	16 A3400 Henley-in-Arden (only southbound) 15 A46, A429 Warwick, Coventry, Stratford-upon-Avon, Worcester, Wellesbourne 14 A452 Leamington Spa (only southbound) 13 A452 Leamington Spa (only northbound) Warwick services 12 B4451 Gaydon, Kineton, Bishop's Itchington	Birmingham	London Oxford
Oxfordshire	M40 motorway	Banbury – Bicester	11 A422, A361 Banbury, Brackley 10 A43, B430 Northampton, Milton Keynes, Middleton Stoney, Brackley, Buckingham 9 A34, A41 Oxford, Newbury, Bicester, Aylesbury, Kidlington	Birmingham	London Oxford
Oxfordshire	A34 road	Bicester – Oxford	Weston-on-the-Green, Wendlebury B4072 Bletchingdon, Islip Kidlington (only southbound) A44, A40 Oxford, Evesham, London, Cheltenham, Gloucester, Witney A420 Oxford, Swindon, Bristol	Birmingham	Newbury Oxford
Oxfordshire	A34 road	Oxford – East Ilsley	A423 Oxford South A4183 Abingdon-on-Thames North (only southbound) Abingdon-on-Thames, Marcham, Kingston Bagpuize A4130, A417 Didcot, Wantage, Steventon A4185 Chilton West Isley, The Ridgeway	Birmingham Oxford	Southampton Newbury
West Berkshire	A34 road	East Ilsley – Newbury	East Ilsley, Compton, West Ilsley Chieveley, Beedon (only southbound) M4, E30 London, Reading, Swindon, Bristol, Cardiff, South Wales Chieveley services A339 Newbury, Thatcham, Basingstoke A4 Newbury, Hungerford, Marlborough	Birmingham Oxford	Southampton Newbury
Hampshire	A34 road	Newbury – Winchester	A343 Newbury, Highclere, Andover B4640 Burghclere, Newbury Burghclere, Kingsclere, Highclere, Whitway (only northbound) Whitchurch, Litchfield, Dunley, Woodcott B3400 Whitchurch, Tufton, Overton (only northbound) A303, A30, A343 Basingstoke, Andover, Salisbury, Stockbridge Sutton Scotney services Worthy Down, South Wonston, Littleton, Winchester Winchester, Kings Worthy, Micheldever, Popham 9 M3, A272 Winchester, Southampton, Portsmouth, Bournemouth, Basingstoke, London	Oxford Newbury	Southampton Winchester
Hampshire	M3 motorway	Winchester – Southampton	10 A31, B3330 Winchester, Alton (only northbound) 11 A3090 Winchester 12 A335 Eastleigh North, Chandler's Ford 13 A335 Eastleigh Center 14 M27 Southampton Center, Portsmouth, Worthing, Brighton, Bournemouth, Poole, Weymouth Southampton	London Winchester	Southampton
(European Union) (France) (Normandy)	Sea route Southampton – Le Havre		France towards Le Havre, Rouen and Paris		
