= A73 road =

Former trunk road in Scotland

A73

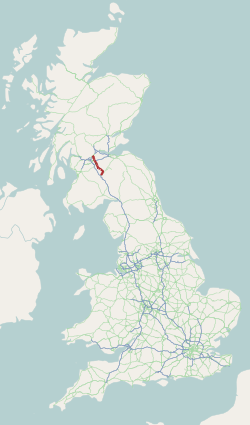

Route information
- Length: 37.9 mi (61.0 km)

Major junctions
- South end: A702 near Abington; 55.5190°N 3.6856°W
- M8 / A8 near Chapelhall
- North end: M80 in Cumbernauld; 55.9435°N 4.0136°W

Location
- Country: United Kingdom
- Constituent country: Scotland
- Council areas: South Lanarkshire, North Lanarkshire

Road network
- Roads in the United Kingdom; Motorways; A and B road zones

The A73 is a former trunk route in Scotland, that connects the M74 at Abington, Jct. 13 to the M80 motorway at Cumbernauld. Running for approximately 37 miles (60 km), it passes through the towns of Lanark, Carluke, Newmains, Chapelhall and Airdrie. Formerly a main route connecting the north of Scotland to England it has less importance these days, and is now merely a local feeder to the two motorways with which it connects.

The sections between Abington & Carluke and Cumbernauld & Newhouse were the first sections to be downgraded from a trunk route to a secondary route, following the construction of the shorter M73 further west, which connected the M74 at Jct. 4. This motorway removed the need for vehicles from the north to use the A73 to reach England.

Following this downgrading, the remaining section of A73 between Carluke and Newhouse remained a trunk route for vehicles travelling between Glasgow and Peebles. For this reason, two new sections of dual carriageway were built between Bellside & Newmains and Bogside & Law, as well as a new bypass for the town centre of Carluke, where the trunk route continues as the A721.

Eventually though, the M74 was completed and it became easier for vehicles travelling from Peebles to Glasgow, to use the A702 trunk route instead, which also joins the M74 at Abington.

For this reason, the entire length of the A73 was downgraded to a secondary route, although it is still heavily trafficked, especially between Lanark and the M8 at Newhouse.

== Junction list ==
Council area	Location	mi	km	Destinations	Notes
South Lanarkshire	Roberton	0.0	0.0	A702 to A74(M) – Biggar, Edinburgh, Carlisle	Southern terminus
South Lanarkshire	Covington	7.2	11.6	A72 east (Biggar Road) to A702 – Symington, Biggar, Edinburgh	Southern terminus of A72 concurrency
South Lanarkshire	Carmichael	12.7	20.4	A70 west – Ayr	Southern terminus of A70 concurrency
South Lanarkshire	Lanark	13.1	21.1	A70 east – Carstairs, Edinburgh	Northern terminus of A70 concurrency
South Lanarkshire	Lanark	15.5	24.9	A743 east (St Leonard Street) to A70 – Carstairs, Edinburgh	Information signed southbound only; western terminus of A743
South Lanarkshire	Lanark	15.5	24.9	A706 north (Hope Street) – Whitburn, Linlithgow	Southern terminus of A706
South Lanarkshire	Lanark	15.9	25.6	A72 west (Kirkfieldbank Brae) – Hamilton	Northern terminus of A72 concurrency
South Lanarkshire	Carluke	21.1	34.0	A721 southeast (Glamis Avenue) to A70 – Peebles	Southern terminus of A721 concurrency
South Lanarkshire	Carluke– Cambusnethan boundary	23.3	37.5	A721 northwest (Wishaw Road) / Hyndshaw Road – Wishaw	Northern terminus of A721 concurrency
North Lanarkshire	Newmains	24.4	39.3	A71 west (Overtown Road) – Kilmarnock, Overtown, Waterloo	Southern terminus of A71 concurrency
North Lanarkshire	Newmains	24.8	39.9	A71 north (Morningside Road) / A722 west (Manse Road) to Bonkle Road / B717 – Edinburgh, Shotts, Wishaw, Bonkle	Northern terminus of A71 concurrency; eastern terminus of A722
North Lanarkshire	Newhouse	28.8	46.3	A775 west (Edinburgh Road) / B7066 (Glasgow and Edinburgh Road) to A723 / B7069 – Holytown, Motherwell, Harthill, Salsburgh, Whitburn	Eastern terminus of A775
North Lanarkshire	Newhouse– Chapelhall boundary	29.0– 29.2	46.7– 47.0	M8 / A8 to M73 / M74 – Edinburgh, Glasgow, Coatbridge, Eurocentral	To M74 and Eurocentral signed northbound only, To M73 southbound only; M8 junction 6
North Lanarkshire	Airdrie	31.8	51.2	A89 (Clark Street / Forrest Street) – Airdrie, Coatbridge, Plains	
North Lanarkshire	Airdrie	32.5	52.3	A8010 southwest (Black Street) / Burnhead Road (B8058) to A89 – Glasgow, Coatbridge	Hospital signed southbound only; northeastern terminus of A8010
North Lanarkshire		35.2– 35.7	56.6– 57.5	To B8039 – Cumbernauld	Junction; no northbound entrance
North Lanarkshire	Cumbernauld	37.9	61.0	M80 to M73 – Glasgow, Carlisle, Stirling, Kincardine Bridge; B8048 – Kirkintilloch, Kilsyth, Cumbernauld	Northern terminus; M80 junction 5
1.000 mi = 1.609 km; 1.000 km = 0.621 mi: Concurrency terminus; Incomplete access
