= A72 road =

Road in Scotland

A72

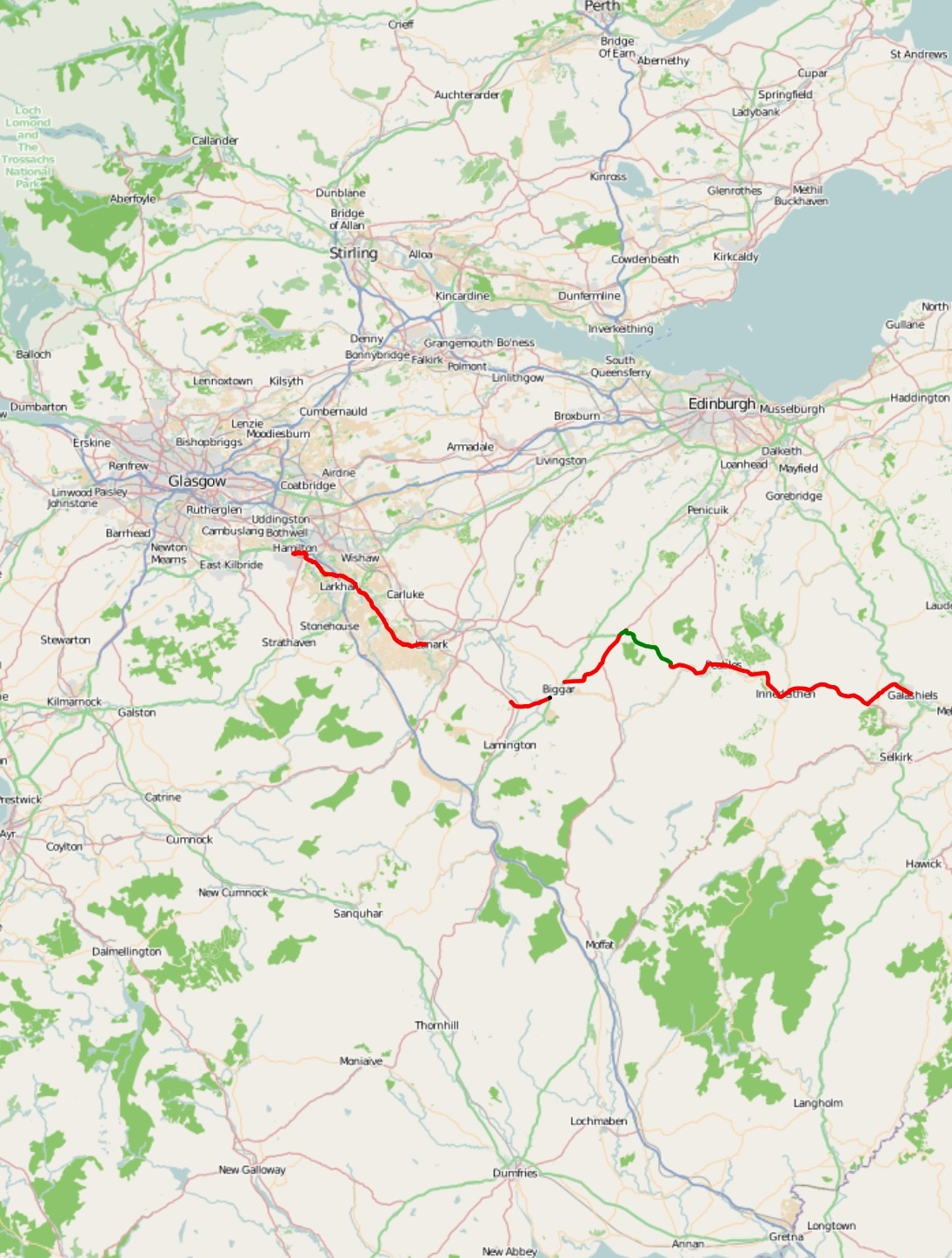
- Click map to enlarge

Route information
- Length: 63.1 mi (101.5 km)

Major junctions
- West end: A724 in Hamilton; 55.7778°N 4.0532°W

- M74 near Larkhall; A702 near Biggar
- East end: A7 in Galashiels; 55.6189°N 2.8121°W

Location
- Country: United Kingdom
- Constituent country: Scotland
- Council areas: North Lanarkshire, South Lanarkshire, Scottish Borders
- Primary destinations: Hamilton, Lanark, Peebles, Galashiels

Road network
- Roads in the United Kingdom; Motorways; A and B road zones

The A72 road is a major route in Scotland connecting Hamilton in South Lanarkshire, with Galashiels in the Scottish Borders. It travels for over 97 kilometres (60 mi) in a south-easterly direction, along the Clyde and Tweed valleys, passing the towns of Larkhall, Lanark, Biggar and Peebles.

== Route ==
=== Hamilton to Lanark ===
Starting at the junction with the A724, the road parallels the M74, following the original A74 (now B7078) before descending into the forested Clyde Valley as it skirts around the town of Larkhall. The road follows the River Clyde, with some tight bends, sheer drops and adverse cambers, and meets the A73 just north of Lanark.

=== Lanark to Causewayend ===
This section of the road follows the course of the A73 through the town of Lanark and, just before Symington, again becomes the A72. It meets the main A702, Edinburgh to Abington, South Lanarkshire road; this short section of road is narrow as it passes through Symington.

=== Causewayend to Kaimrig End ===
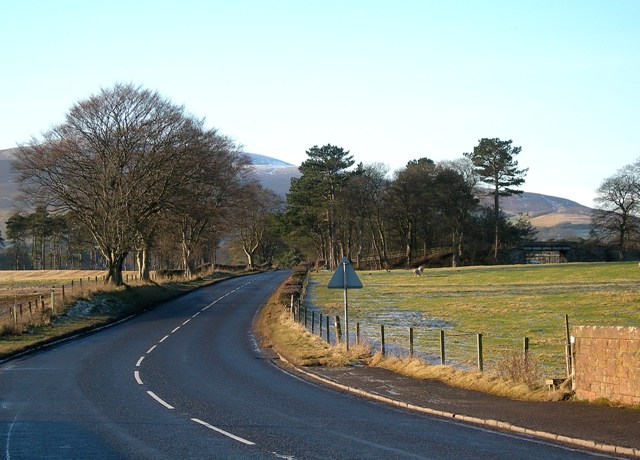
The A72 near Wolfclyde between Symington and Biggar

This section of the road follows the course of the A702 for approximately 3 miles through the town of Biggar. The A72 enters the village of Skirling before ascending onto higher moorland. This section of road is notorious for accidents due to its high elevation, poor weather and winding route.

=== Kaimrig End to Galashiels ===
On this last 9.7 kilometres (6 mi) section of A72, it is the secondary route on the A701. Just south of Blyth Bridge, it meets the A721, and less than a mile further, it leaves the course of the A701. The A72 ascends a high plateau, then descends into the valley of the River Tweed at Stobo, and parallels the Tweed for the remainder of its length.

The road passes through Peebles and then Innerleithen and Walkerburn towards Galashiels. It comes to an end at a junction with the A7, which leads on to the Galashiels Ring Road.

== Junction list ==
Council area	Location	mi	km	Destinations	Notes
South Lanarkshire	Hamilton	0.0	0.0	A724 (Union Street / Burnbank Road) / B755 (Wellhall Road) / B7012 – Town centre, Rutherglen, East Kilbride, Hillhouse	Western terminus
South Lanarkshire	Hamilton	1.2	1.9	A723 northeast to M74 – Motherwell, Glasgow, Carlisle	Western terminus of A723 concurrency
South Lanarkshire	Hamilton	1.4	2.3	A723 southwest to A724 – Strathaven, Rutherglen, East Kilbride	Eastern terminus of A723 concurrency
South Lanarkshire		4.3– 4.5	6.9– 7.2	M74 northwest – Glasgow	No access to M74 southeast or from M74 northwest
South Lanarkshire	Garrion Bridge	6.4	10.3	A71 west (Ayr Road) to M74 / B7019 – Kilmarnock, Stonehouse, Carlisle, Larkhall	To M74, B7019, Carlisle and Larkhall signed westbound only; western terminus of A71 concurrency
South Lanarkshire– North Lanarkshire boundary	Garrion Bridge	6.7– 6.9	10.8– 11.1	A71 east (Horsley Brae) – Edinburgh, Newmains, Overtown	Newmains signed eastbound only; eastern terminus of A71 concurrency
South Lanarkshire	Lanark	14.7	23.7	A73 north (Glasgow Road) to A8 – Carluke, Airdrie, Glasgow	Western terminus of A72 concurrency
South Lanarkshire	Lanark	15.0	24.1	A706 north (Hope Street) – Whitburn, Linlithgow	Southern terminus of A706
South Lanarkshire	Lanark	14.9– 15.1	24.0– 24.3	A743 east (St Leonard Street) to A70 – Carstairs, Edinburgh	Information signed eastbound only; western terminus of A743
South Lanarkshire	Lanark	17.3	27.8	A70 east – Carstairs, Edinburgh	Western terminus of A70 concurrency
South Lanarkshire	Carmichael	17.6	28.3	A70 west – Ayr	Eastern terminus of A70 concurrency
South Lanarkshire	Covington	23.2	37.3	A73 south to M74 – Carlisle	Eastern terminus of A73 concurrency
South Lanarkshire	Biggar	26.5	42.6	A702 south / M74 / A74(M) / A73 – Carlisle, Glasgow	To A73 signed eastbound only, To M74, A74(M) and Glasgow westbound only; western terminus of A702 concurrency
South Lanarkshire	Biggar	28.2	45.4	A702 north – Edinburgh	Eastern terminus of A702 concurrency
Scottish Borders	Broughton, Glenholm and Kilbucho	31.9	51.3	A701 south – Broughton, Moffat	Western terminus of A701 concurrency
Scottish Borders	Kirkurd	34.5	55.5	A721 northwest – Glasgow	Southeastern terminus of A721
Scottish Borders	Kirkurd– Blyth Bridge boundary	35.1– 35.2	56.5– 56.6	A701 north – Edinburgh, Romannobridge, West Linton	Rommanobridge and West Linton signed westbound only; eastern terminus of A701 concurrency
Scottish Borders	Peebles	45.3	72.9	A703 north – Edinburgh	Southern terminus of A703
Scottish Borders	Caddonfoot	58.8	94.6	A707 south – Selkirk	Northern terminus of A707
Scottish Borders	Galashiels	63.1	101.5	A7 (Ladhope Vale) – Town centre, Hawick, Edinburgh	Eastern terminus
1.000 mi = 1.609 km; 1.000 km = 0.621 mi: Concurrency terminus; Incomplete access
