= Edinburgh City Bypass =

Road in Scotland

A720

Route information
- Part of E15
- Length: 13 mi (21 km)

Major junctions
- East end: Old Craighall
- A1; A68; A6106; A7; A772; A701; A702; A71; M8; A8
- West end: South Gyle

Location
- Country: United Kingdom
- Constituent country: Scotland
- Primary destinations: Queensferry Crossing, Edinburgh, Musselburgh, Berwick-upon-Tweed

Road network
- Roads in the United Kingdom; Motorways; A and B road zones

The Edinburgh City Bypass, designated as A720, is one of the most important trunk roads in Scotland. Circling around the south of Edinburgh, as the equivalent of a ring road for the coastal city, it links together the A1 towards north-east England, the A702 towards north-west England, the M8 through the Central Belt towards Glasgow, the A7 through south-east Scotland and north-west England as well as the A8 leading to the M9 for Stirling and the Queensferry Crossing.

The road is dual carriageway standard throughout, including emergency laybys and hard shoulders in areas. The road is classed as a special road in legal terms. Every motorway in the UK is termed a special road in that specific regulations govern its use. Not every special road is classed as a motorway and this bypass is one of those roads.

The A720 forms part of European route E15, which runs from Inverness, in northern Scotland, to Algeciras, in southern Spain. North of Gogar, the E15 runs towards the A90 and the Queensferry Crossing; and south of Old Craighall on the A1.

== History ==
A720 was built in sections between 1980 and 1989. The first section built was the Colinton section (A702 to Baberton) opened in 1981, with the Dreghorn junction opening circa 1985. Next up was the Sighthill section (Baberton to A8 at Gogarburn) which opened in late 1986. 1988 saw two sections open: the Burdiehouse section (A702 to A701) in the summer followed in the autumn by the section between the A68 at Sheriffhall and the A1 at Old Craighall. The last section was completed in 1989 around the Gilmerton junction.

== Junctions ==
The A720 starts at the Old Craighall junction in the east where it meets the A1, from which traffic can approach Edinburgh city centre from the east, or run past Musselburgh and Haddington on the way to England.

=== Junction 1: Millerhill ===
This junction comes shortly after the eastern start of the A720, which was completed in 2008 as the Dalkeith Northern Bypass of the A68. This is a crucial route for traffic to south-east Scotland.

In 2013 the road between Millerhill and Sheriffhall was temporarily diverted for the construction of a new underbridge serving the rebuilt Edinburgh-Galashiels railway line, as the original railway had been closed and was built over when the bypass was built.

=== Junction 2: Sheriffhall Roundabout ===
About 1 1/2 miles (2.5 kilometres) further is the most congested junction on the bypass. Whereas all the other junctions on the bypass are grade separated, Sheriffhall is a traffic-light controlled roundabout and the traffic problems of forcing all through A720 traffic to halt is worsened by the importance of the roads which intersect here – the A7 which leads north to the city centre and south to Carlisle, the former A68 which now leads to Dalkeith and the A68, and the A6106. Traffic jams are common at most times of day. The junction was not built with grade separation because of a geological fault that crosses the bypass here, and the area having (at the time) active coal mining.

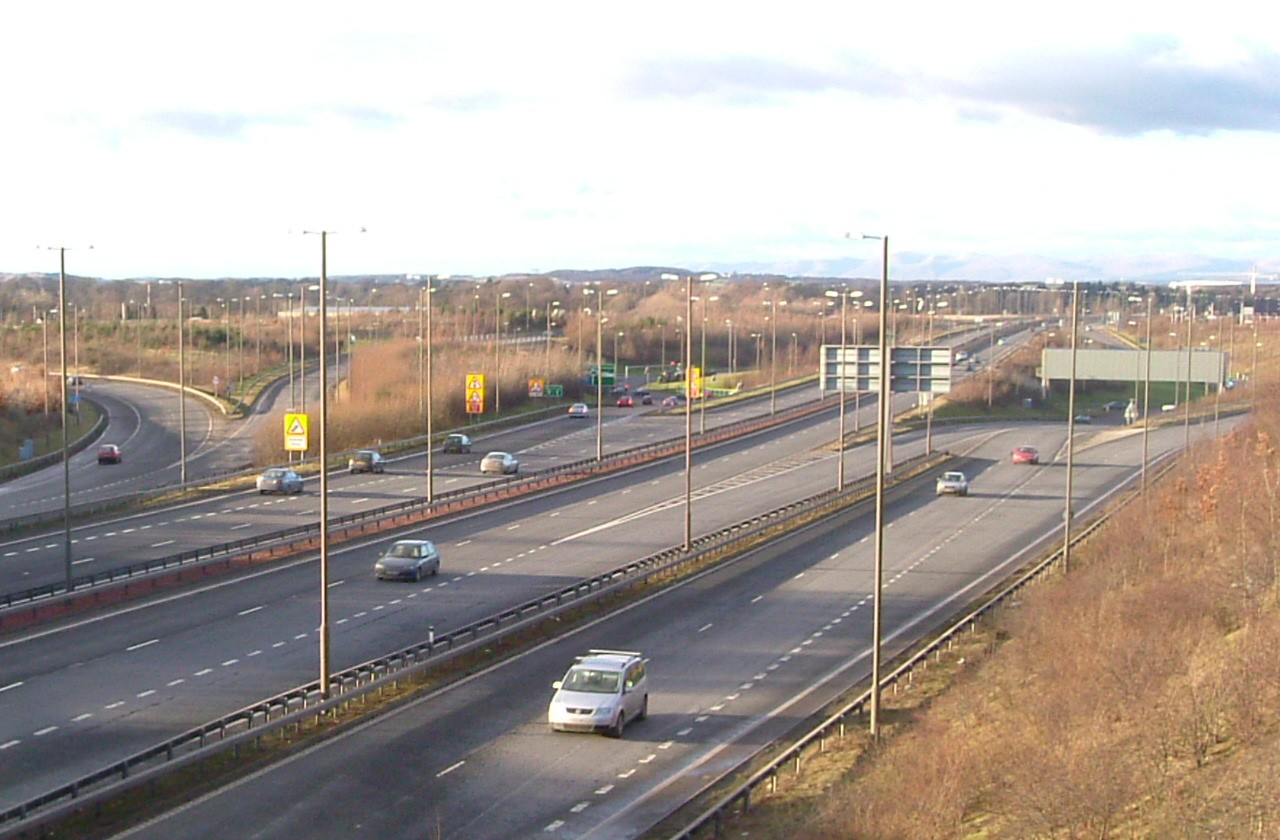
Hermiston Junction where the A720 meets the M8 and the A71

In 2015, an upgrade for the Sheriffhall Junction was prepared, with four options for grade separation. In 2020, plans to add a grade-separated through route were costed at £120 million. The project was criticised by the Scottish Greens, who stated that it would induce demand. The flyover is expected to open in 2027, but is still subject to controversy.

=== Junction 3: Gilmerton ===
This is a small junction which is for the A772, that used to be the A7 until the mid-1990s. This road leads to Cameron Toll shopping centre as well as the A701 and the city centre. There is evidence that western slip-roads were considered at the roundabout to join the A772. This junction offers only connections to and from the west on the A720.

=== Junction 4: Lasswade ===
Just shortly after the Gilmerton junction, comes the Lasswade junction. Like the Gilmerton junction, this junction offers only connections to and from the west on the A720.

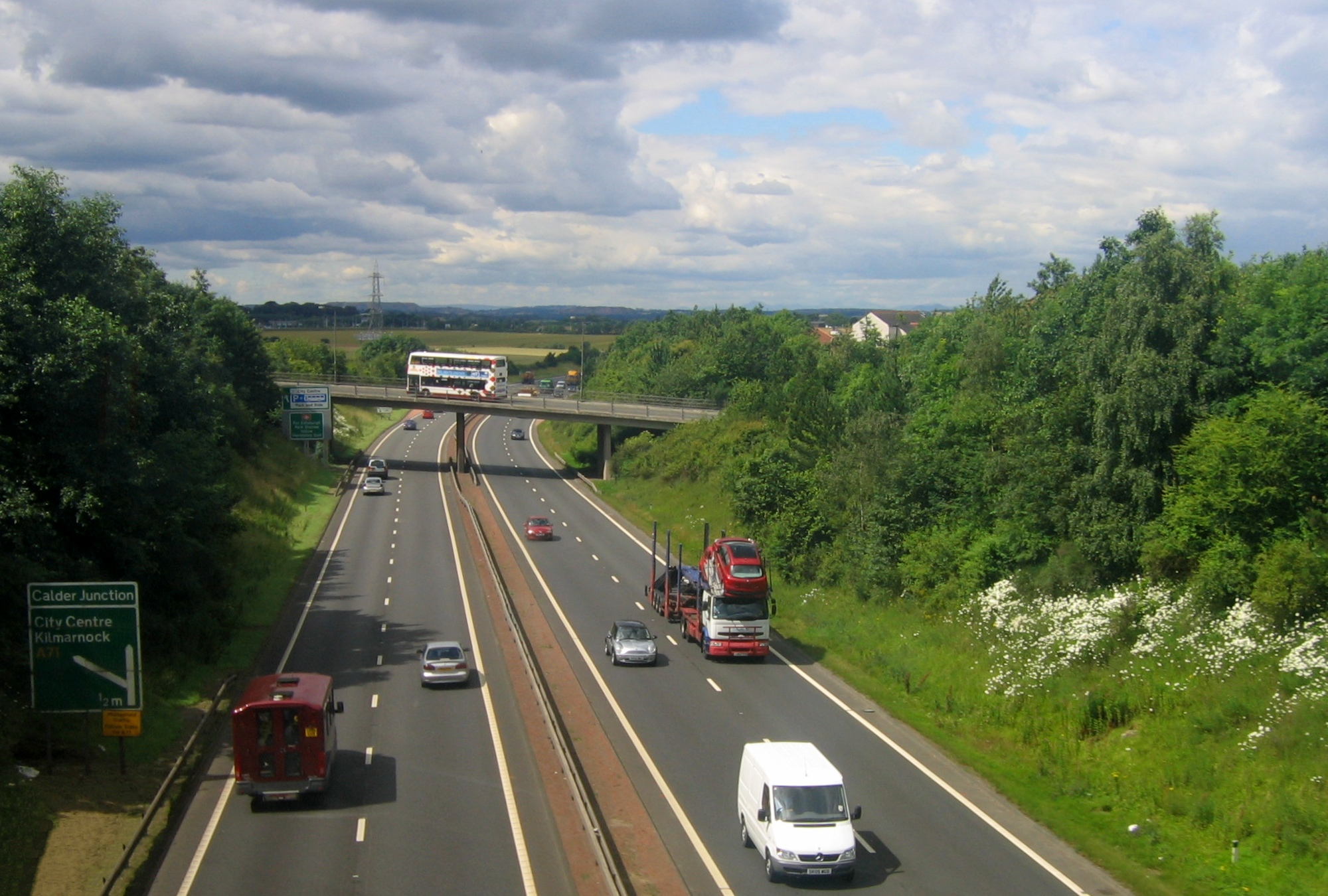
South of Calder Junction

=== Junction 5: Straiton ===
This junction includes access to Straiton Retail Park, Costco, and IKEA. This junction also provides access to the A701 and southern suburbs.

=== Junction 6: Lothianburn ===
This junction was the original eastern terminus of the road. This is a major junction with the A702, which provides access to western England, via Abington and the A74(M) to Carlisle and the M6.

=== Junction 7: Dreghorn ===
This junction primarily provides access to the only services on the bypass. Local roads including the B701, and Dreghorn Barracks are also accessed from this junction.

=== Junction 8: Baberton ===
This junction was the original western terminus of the road. It provides direct access to the suburb of Baberton and indirect access to the A70, for Lanark, or the centre of Edinburgh. This junction offers only connections to and from the eastern stretch of the A720.

=== Junction 9 & 10: Calder and Hermiston Gait ===
The centre of these junctions are within one-half mile (800 metres) of each other, with a tangle of inter-weaving slips roads, flyovers, and underpasses between and either side of them. The A71 meets the bypass at a roundabout over the carriageway, and the M8 terminates at a roundabout under the carriageway, along with access to Hermiston Gait retail park.

The A71 provides one of the main routes into Edinburgh via Calder Road, and west to Livingston and Kilmarnock. The M8 runs to Glasgow and provides direct access to the M9 for Stirling, and via the M90 to the Queensferry Crossing.

=== Junction 11: Gogar Junction ===
Finally the road swings north to finish on the A8 at Gogar Roundabout. The original junction was a simple roundabout connecting both roads, and access to South Gyle and Edinburgh Park. The roundabout now has an underpass for traffic on the A8. From this junction, traffic can proceed into Edinburgh City Centre by an alternative route through Corstorphine, or can head west to Edinburgh Airport and the M9 for Stirling, with connecting roads leading to all places north.
