= Eaglesfield =

Eaglesfield may refer to the following places in the United Kingdom:

- Eaglesfield, Cumbria, hamlet in England
- Eaglesfield, Dumfries and Galloway, village in Scotland
