= A700 road =

Road in Edinburgh

A700

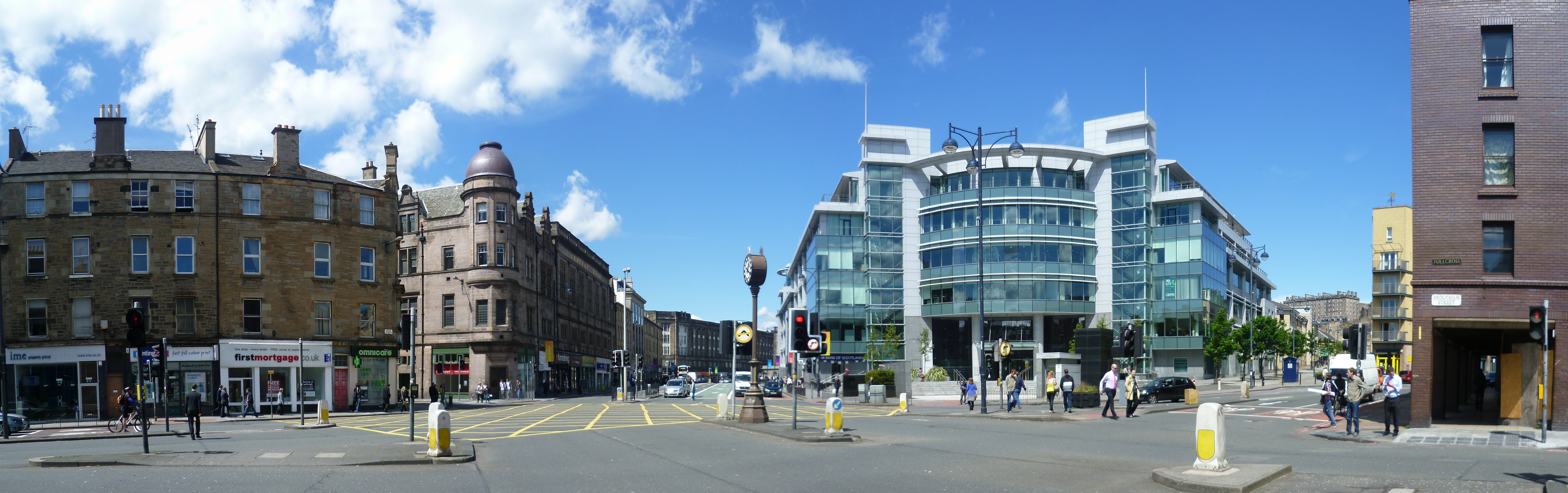
- A composite view of the Tollcross junction with the A702

Route information
- Length: 1.6 mi (2.6 km)

Major junctions
- northwest end: New Town, Edinburgh; 55.9501°N 3.2072°W
- A8 A702; A7 A701
- southeast end: Sciennes, Edinburgh; 55.9391°N 3.1798°W

Location
- Country: United Kingdom

Road network
- Roads in the United Kingdom; Motorways; A and B road zones

The A700 road is a short but important link skirting Edinburgh City Centre between the A8 and A7 roads.

== Route ==
The road begins at the West End junction at the terminus of the A8 and heads south then east comprising the streets of Lothian Road, Earl Grey Street, Brougham Street, Brougham Place, Melville Drive, Summerhall Place and West Preston Street. It ends at a crossroads where it meets the A7 and A701 roads.

The major junction along its route is at Tollcross where it meets Lauriston Place, West Tollcross and the Home Street A702 road. It overlaps for the length of Earl Grey Street with the A702, which diverges to the west on Fountainbridge.

The northern section of the road is a designated a Red Route on which no stopping of vehicles is permitted in order to maintain traffic flow.

== History ==
The Melville Drive section is flanked to the north by The Meadows, a large public park established in the 18th century. At each end of Melville Drive is a pair of stone pillars topped by a lion and a unicorn. The pair at the eastern end were built in 1881, gifted by the publishing and printing company of Thomas Nelson; the pair at the western end were built around 1886 by Sir James Gowans.
