= A702 road =

Road in Scotland

A702

Route information
- Length: 83.5 mi (134.4 km)

Major junctions
- East end: Edinburgh; 55.9436°N 3.2037°W
- A700 A720 A703 A766 A721; A72; A73 – M74 (Northbound) – A74(M) (Southbound); A76 A713
- West end: St. John's Town of Dalry; 55.1059°N 4.1649°W

Location
- Country: United Kingdom
- Primary destinations: Edinburgh, Biggar, Abington

Road network
- Roads in the United Kingdom; Motorways; A and B road zones

The A702 is a major road in Scotland, that runs from Edinburgh to St. John's Town of Dalry in Dumfries and Galloway. It includes the last section of the route from London via the West Midlands and North West England to Edinburgh, which follows the M1, M6, A74(M) and finally the A702.

== Route of Road ==
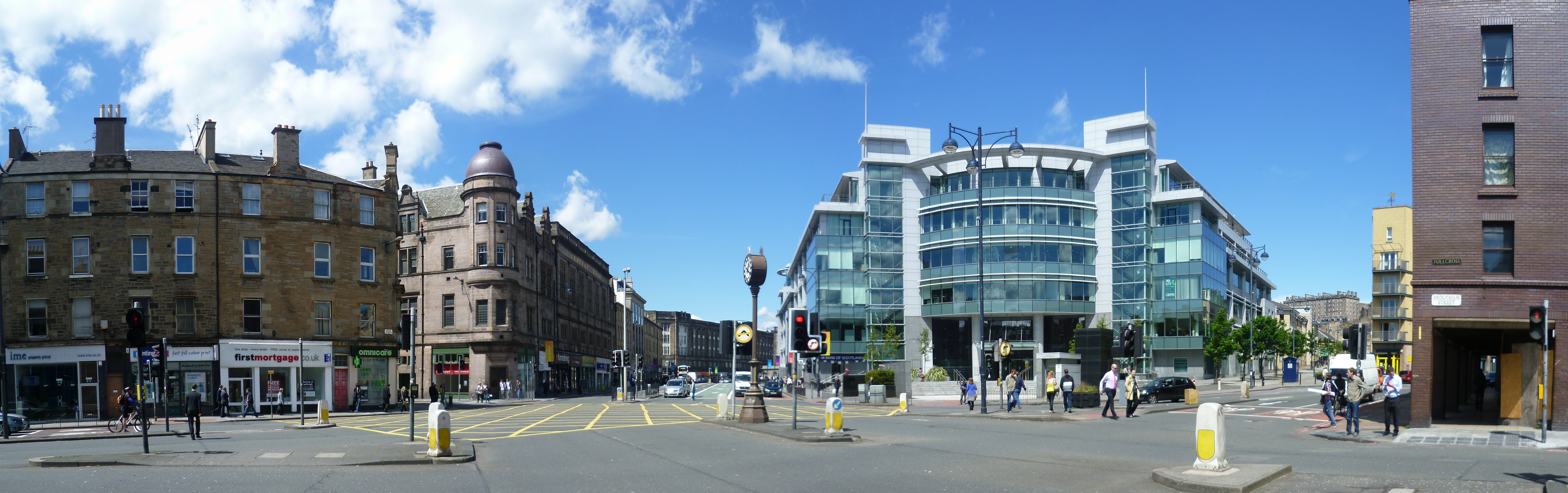
The start of the A702 at the Tollcross junction in central Edinburgh. The road heads off to the left of the photograph.

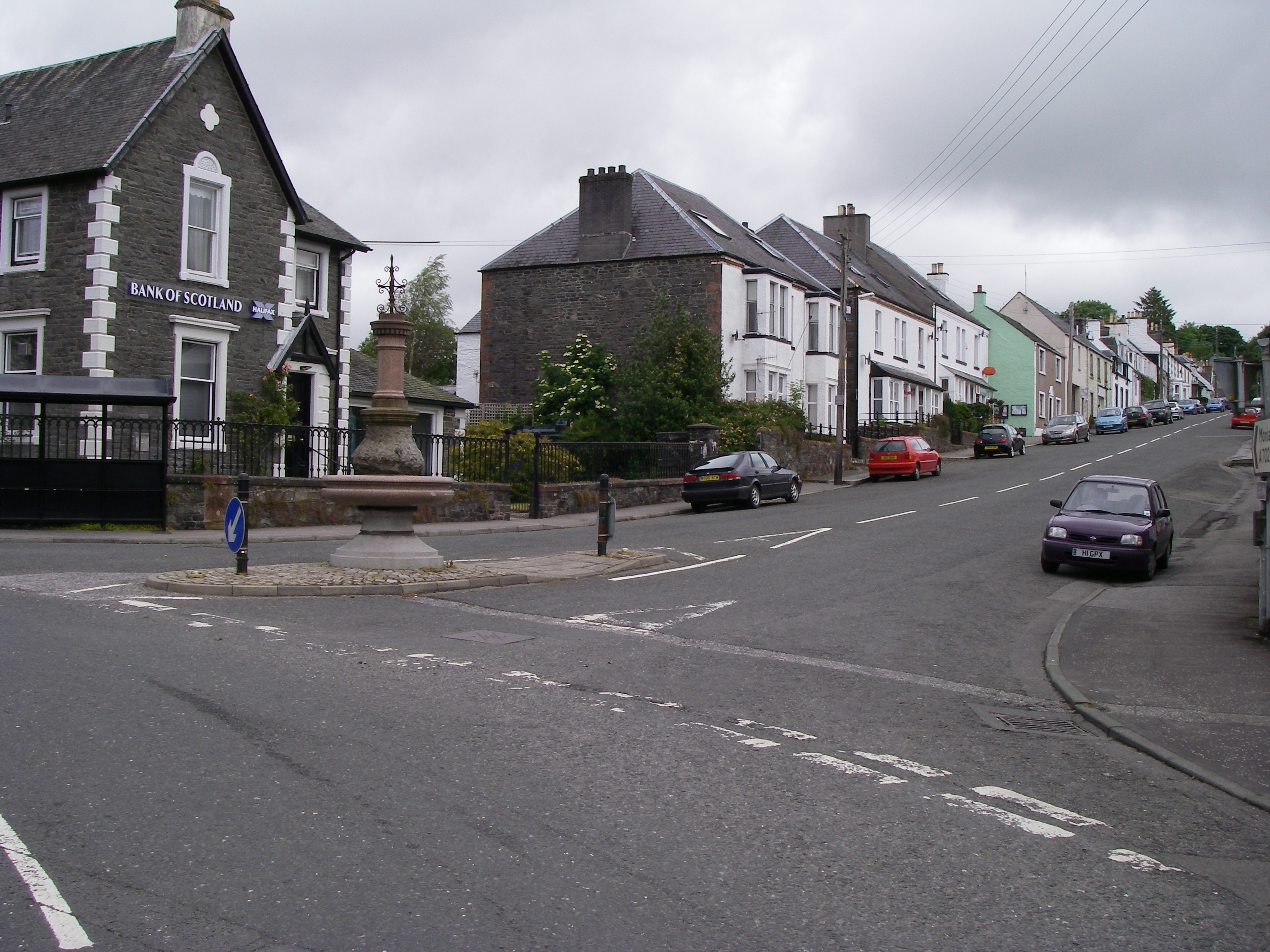
The end of the A702 in St John's Town of Dalry.

The A702 begins as a minor street heading north as Ponton Street from its junction with West Tolcross, then turning east into Fountainbridge, and south into Earl Grey Street where it overlaps with the A700. As of 2013 it is not possible to drive this 0.3-mile (0.48 km) section continuously due to opposing one-way systems.

It starts as a primary route at the Tollcross junction in Edinburgh, and continues south until it meets the Edinburgh City Bypass (A720) on the city's outskirts. In the city it is known as Home Street, Leven Street, Bruntsfield Place, Morningside Road, Comiston Road and finally Biggar Road. It continues in a south-westerly direction beside the Pentland Hills to Biggar, before following the Clyde Valley. The route is a major commuter route for residents of Carlops, West Linton and Biggar who work in and around the Edinburgh area. The road passes through the villages of Coulter and Lamington, before meeting the A73 road at a new roundabout junction, and then shortly afterwards meets junction 13 of the M74. From Abington, it continues as a non-primary route, via the Dalveen Pass through the Lowther Hills, before and overlapping the A76 road for 1 1/2 miles until Thornhill. From Thornhill, the road winds south-west still, through the village of Moniaive, until eventually reaching St. John's Town of Dalry. Here, it terminates at its junction with the A713 road.

The A702 from junction 13 of the M74 is the recommended route to Edinburgh, whereas the windier A7 road is signed as the Tourist Route to Edinburgh. The route attracts a large number of lorries and heavy goods vehicles and even though it includes some reasonably straight sections suitable for overtaking it can be a slow route from the M74 to Edinburgh. One other possible route to Edinburgh for those prepared to enjoy their driving more is the A701 road via Moffat.

The stretch of the A702 between Abington and Edinburgh was formerly part of the Euroroute system, of route E32. The E32 also ran northwards out of Edinburgh along the A90/M90 as far as Perth.
