= A772 road =

Road in Edinburgh

A772

Route information
- Length: 3.6 mi (5.8 km)

Major junctions
- From: Nether Liberton, Edinburgh
- A701 A720; A7
- To: Lasswade, Edinburgh

Location
- Country: United Kingdom
- Constituent country: Scotland

Road network
- Roads in the United Kingdom; Motorways; A and B road zones

The A772 was a major A road located in Edinburgh, Scotland. The A772 was originally the A7 before a major renumbering of the roads into Edinburgh and also begins there, at a junction with the A701 in the neighbourhood of Nether Liberton. From this junction, the A772 heads south-east through Gilmerton, a suburb of Edinburgh. This part is known as Gilmerton Road and has a 30 mph speed limit. At the edge of Gilmerton, the road becomes Drum Street, where it passes The Drum, an 18th-century country house, before reverting to Gilmerton Road.

Approximately 0.5 miles (0.80 km) from its eastern terminus, it crosses over the Edinburgh City Bypass (A720) as a partial grade-separated junction utilizing a pair of roundabouts, where there is evidence of the junction almost having an east-facing sliproad.

Continuing along the Gilmerton Road, the A772 has a roundabout for Dobbies Garden Centre and Edinburgh Butterfly and Insect World, and an inn. Shortly afterwards, the A772 meets its eastern terminus at the Gilmerton Road Roundabout with the A7 and B6392 (formerly the A68) at the community of Melville Nurseries, between Lasswade and Dalkeith. The B6392 continues to be called Gilmerton Road as far as the River North Esk.
