= A74(M) and M74 motorways =

Major motorway in Scotland

M74
- M74 highlighted in blue

Route information
- Part of E05
- Length: 40 mi (64 km)
- Existed: 1966–present
- History: Constructed 1966–2011

Major junctions
- Northwest end: Tradeston; 55.85383°N 4.270399°W
- J1 → M8 motorway J4 → M73 motorway J13 → A74(M) motorway
- Southeast end: Abington; 55.5067°N 3.6974°W

Location
- Country: United Kingdom
- Primary destinations: Glasgow, Hamilton, East Kilbride

Road network
- Roads in the United Kingdom; Motorways; A and B road zones
| ← M73 | → M77 |

A74(M)
- A74(M) highlighted in blue

Route information
- Part of E05 and E18
- Length: 45 mi (72 km)
- Existed: 1991–present
- History: Constructed 1991–1999

Major junctions
- Northwest end: Abington (See M74 above.)
- J13 → M74 motorway J22 → M6 motorway
- Southeast end: Longtown; 54.9975°N 3.0562°W

Location
- Country: United Kingdom
- Primary destinations: Dumfries, Carlisle

Road network
- Roads in the United Kingdom; Motorways; A and B road zones
| ← A66(M) | → A167(M) |

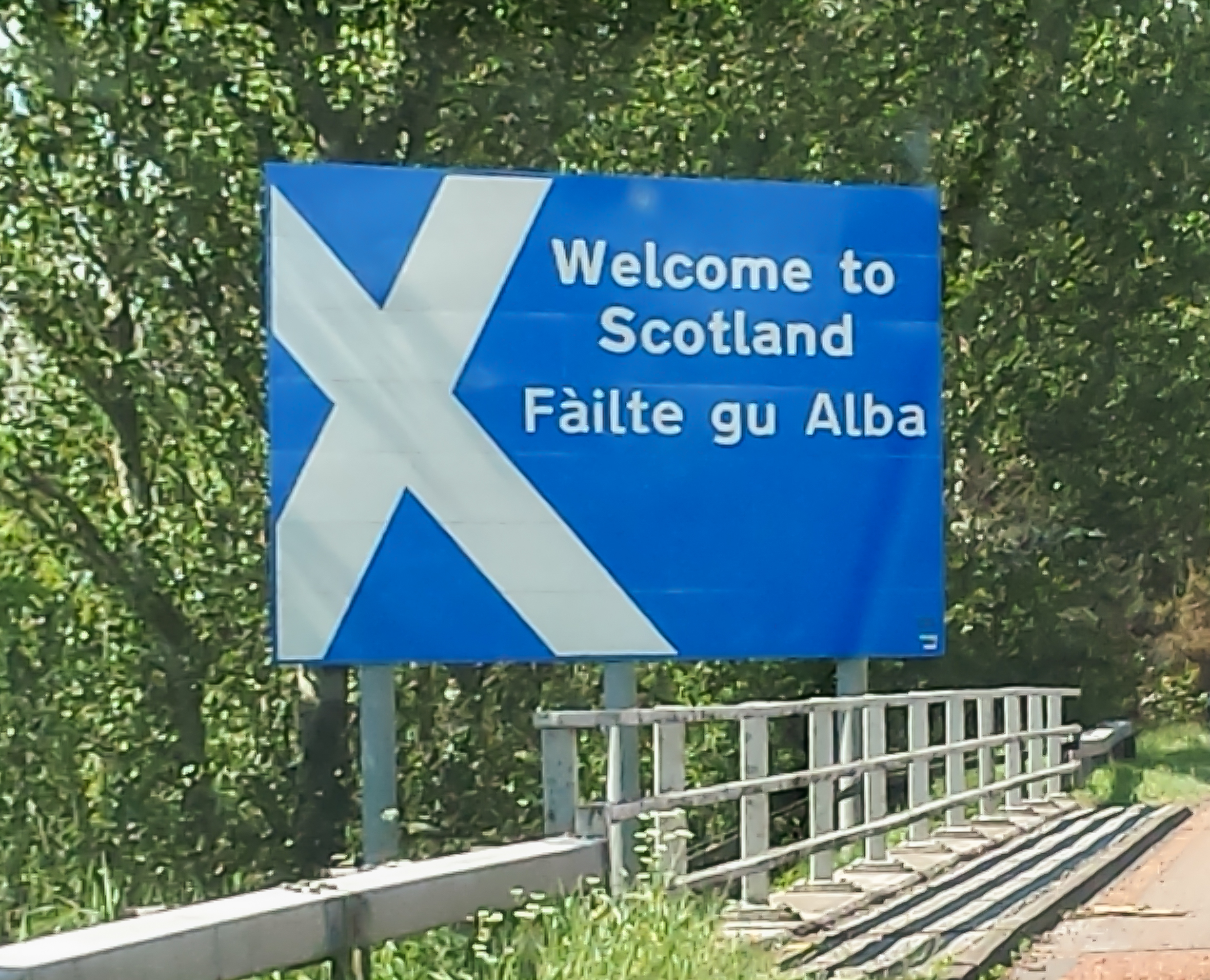
Sign on the northbound A74(M) on the Scottish border near its southern end

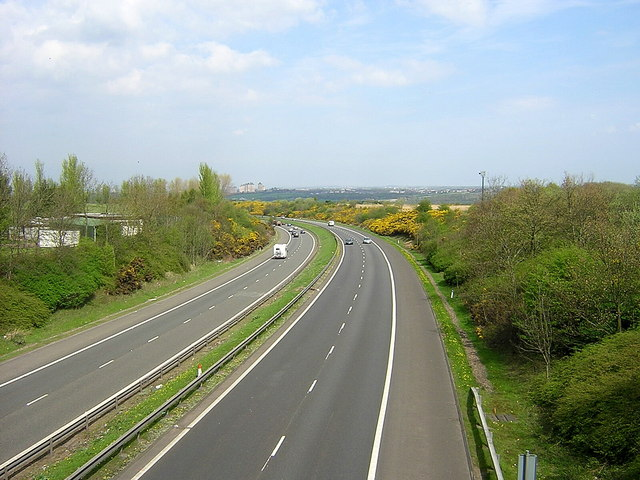
M74 near Larkhall

The A74(M) and M74 form a major motorway in Scotland, connecting it to England. The routes connect the M8 motorway in central Glasgow to the Scottish-English border at Gretna. They are part of the unsigned international E-road network E05. Although the entire route is colloquially referred to as the M74, for more than half its length, south of Abington, the road is officially the A74(M); see naming confusion below.

== Route ==
From its junction with the M8 just south of the Kingston Bridge, the newest section passes through the Glasgow districts of Govanhill, Polmadie, Oatlands and parts of the nearby towns of Rutherglen and Cambuslang, on an elevated embankment, with junctions at Kingston, Polmadie Road, Eastfield and Tollcross before connecting to the much older section of the M74. It then runs in a roughly south-easterly direction past the Clyde Valley towns of Uddingston, Bothwell, Hamilton and Motherwell, meeting the A725 road at junction 5 (Raith Interchange), before meeting the cross-country A71 at Larkhall. It passes west of Lanark and beyond Abington, where it changes into the A74(M). The road then bypasses Moffat and Lockerbie. The road then shortly enters England before becoming the M6 near Longtown.

From junction 4 southwards it is part of the E05 Euroroute from Greenock to Algeciras. North from junction 4, the E05 takes a short stretch of the M73 connecting to the M8 and then proceeds westwards through Glasgow to Greenock.

== History ==
=== Original M74 – 1960s ===
The A74 was the original route from Glasgow to Carlisle, where it met the A7 in Carlisle city centre and the A6 south to London.

Starting in the 1930s, the single-carriageway road between Gretna and Glasgow was progressively upgraded to dual carriageway, being completed in the early 1970s with the completion of the Gretna bypass.

At the northern end, it was not possible simply to add to the existing carriageway because of the built-up nature of the area. A bypass was built as one of Scotland's first motorways, the M74, from Draffan to Maryville, north of Uddingston, completed by 1969. Junctions were originally numbered from south to north, which was the normal convention at the time numbers increasing going away from London, as there were no plans to extend the motorway.

The northern section around Hamilton was built as three-lane dual carriageway, narrowing to two-lane dual carriageway south of junction 4. It continued as the A74 dual-carriageway from Draffan and carrying on to link with the M6 junction 44 at Carlisle.

=== First extension (1984–1987) ===
The southern sections, where there was no need to bypass the existing route, were not originally upgraded to motorway standard, but to dual carriageway without hard shoulders or full grade separation. The gradual construction of the M6 from Rugby (where it met the M1 to London) to Carlisle in 1970, where it terminated on the A74, meant that the route from Glasgow to London was entirely dual carriageway.

This led to calls for the already dualled A74 from Draffan to the M6 to be upgraded a second time, to motorway standard. As the government had already invested in the dual carriageway upgrade, they initially resisted these calls. In 1972 the Government agreed to extend the M74 from Draffan to today's junction 12 at Millbank. It was built in three sections, opening 1986–87. It was constructed to dual two-lane standard, and included a bypass of Lesmahagow, as the M74.

In 1984, in preparation for the southwards extension, the junction numbers were changed to go from north to south, Raith (junction 5) on the original south to north numbering remained as junction 5, with Maryville (the most northerly junction at that time) becoming junction 4, leaving lesser numbers available for junctions for the expected continuation of the motorway northwards.

When the first southern extension opened, Draffan, originally junction 1, ceased to exist and junction 9 (the first junction on the new extension) was and still is only a southbound exit onto the old A74 just south of Blackwood village, to serve the villages of Blackwood, Kirkmuirhill, Lesmahagow and Coalburn.

=== 1990s extension to Scotland-England border (1992–1999) ===
In 1987, the government committed to upgrading the remaining A74 from junction 12 to the M6 to motorway standard. When the first section opened, as far south as Abington (junctions 12-J13) in 1991 it was numbered M74. Following this, the government announced that the route would be completed as the M6, as the two motorways would meet head on at Carlisle. The Scottish section of the A74 was then upgraded in sections, not all contiguous, as the A74(M), a temporary number until all the sections were complete, and the eight-mile (13 km) English section had been constructed and connected to the M6. They were constructed with dual three-lane carriageways. In 1995, the first northern extension was opened to Fullerton Road in Glasgow, as M74. The A74 upgrades were complete by 1999.

=== M6 Carlisle – Guards Mill (2004–2008) ===
Plans to upgrade the English section of A74 (Cumberland Gap) from the Scottish border at Gretna to Carlisle were announced in 2004. Costing £174 million, this was constructed as M6 as originally planned in the 1990s, and was opened on 5 December 2008. The project also included the construction of a new bridge crossing the River Esk. This means that there is now a continuous motorway from London to Glasgow, with four numbers (M1, M6, A74(M) and M74).

=== M74 northern extension to M8 (2008–2011) ===
Construction on the six-lane M74 Northern Extension or M74 Completion Scheme northwards by 5 miles (8.0 km) through the south-eastern part of Glasgow to meet the M8 started in 2008, with opening on 28 June 2011. The extension involved the demolition of the Rosebery Park football ground.

The city centre section is supposed to perform a similar role to the never-built southern flank of the Glasgow Inner Ring Road planned in the 1960s, and first set out as a scheme in the Bruce Report of the 1940s, but only half-completed.

The scheme was opposed by JAM74, a coalition of various activist groups, led by Friends of the Earth. They successfully called for a public inquiry, which took place during 2003 and 2004. Developers mobilised discourses of blight and inflated job claims (which had expanded from 2,900-4,000 in 1994 to 44,000 in 2001) to argue for approval. The enquiry concluded that the job forecasts were "not [shown] to be robust" and the extension would have "very serious undesirable results", including community severance and an adverse effect on the environment. First Minister Jack McConnell said the road would be authorised regardless of the inquiry's findings.

The scheme was at the centre of a road protest from local campaigners and environmentalists; JAM74 launched an appeal against the original decision to ignore the inquiry's advice, however the case against the road orders collapsed on the first day of the hearing in June 2006, the net effect being a further three years delay to the start of construction, adding an estimated £20m to the construction cost. Scottish First Minister Alex Salmond officially launched construction on 28 May 2008. Construction was carried out by Interlink M74, a joint venture of Balfour Beatty, Morgan Est, Morrison Construction and Sir Robert McAlpine.

Archaeological mitigation was required as part of the project and was one of the largest coordinated series of excavations carried out in an industrial city in Western Europe. Due to the sheer size of the project a joint venture by Headland Archaeology and Pre-Construct Archaeology were responsible for the excavations in 2007 and 2008; during this time eight large former industrial sites were investigated involving more than a hundred archaeologists. Discoveries included the Govan Iron Works and associated workers' housing, the Caledonian Pottery, a block of 19th century tenements, a biscuit factory, urban limeworks and more. Many of the structures were in use into the 20th century. The excavation of both manufacturing and domestic sites provided a unique insight into both how objects were made and how they were used. Finds included stamped bricks from three local manufacturers, bottle and window glass fragments, and pottery stamps or transfer prints with different customer names on them.

The project's cost far exceeded original projections. In 1999, it was expected to cost £177 million. By the time the contract was awarded, it was projected at £445 million. It ran under-budget at £437 million. The project total is estimated to be £692 million once the cost of purchasing land is included. There was a £12 million allowance for grouting of old mine workings. The road was labelled "Britain's most expensive road" by the Glasgow Evening Times and Green MSP Patrick Harvie said the money should instead have been used to fund active and public transport improvements.

A report issued by Transport Scotland, one year after its opening, found the scheme was achieving its key objectives, including improved journey times and providing relief to the local road network and M8.

=== East End Regeneration Route ===
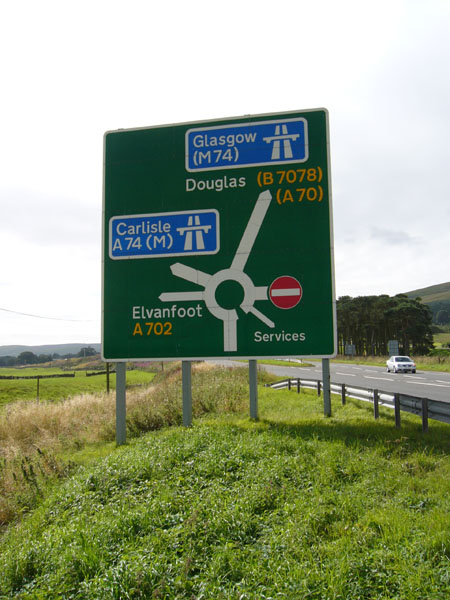
Road sign on the A702 showing the change in designation

Construction of the East End Regeneration Route (designated as the A728) made use of existing stretches of road and filler sections on previously derelict land and has the ultimate intention to connect the M74 Northern Extensions with the M8 motorway at the Provan Gas Works interchange with the M80 motorway. Phase 1 and Phase 2 from the M74 junction 1A (Polmadie) to the A89 west of Parkhead began in 2008 and was completed in 2012, but Phase 3 from Parkhead to the M80 did not follow as planned. Although plans were approved in early 2016, construction did not commence; in 2021, it was confirmed that the project was still under consideration by the council despite funding problems and opposition on environmental grounds.

=== Star of Caledonia ===
A new sculpture is planned near Gretna called the Star of Caledonia. One intention is for it to be viewed from the motorway, although there will be no motorway signs to indicate the structure.

== Naming confusion ==
The motorway is usually referred to as the M74, as it is one continuous route and has a continuous junction numbering system, but south of Abington it is the A74(M), as noted on each sign, save for one erroneous "M74" sign at Gretna Green services.

One reason for this was an intended future-proofing measure. The A74(M) naming was planned only as a temporary solution for a road that would ultimately become the northern part of the M6. Indeed if an M7 motorway were ever to be built to Edinburgh, it would begin somewhere near the present junction 13 with the A702 road.

When the A74(M) was constructed in the 1990s, many of the signs were given patches with the A74(M) number: these patches can be peeled away to reveal "M6" underneath. One such sign, at the DVSA checkpoint at Beattock summit, states that it is the "M6 South", instead of the "A74(M) South". This left an anomaly – the M74 began at Glasgow, then at junction 13 changed to A74(M) for the 40 miles (64 km) to the border. Meanwhile, the English eight-mile (thirteen-kilometre) section of A74 was not upgraded due to lack of funds, leaving the "Cumberland Gap" of dual carriageway between the three-lane motorways. Until around 1996, the change of designation to M6 once the Cumberland Gap had been closed was definite. When the Scottish Executive was established in 1999, taking over responsibility for roads in Scotland, Sarah Boyack said that "We have no current plans to rename or redesignate the M74 or A74(M) motorways between Glasgow and the border as the M6".

== Junction renumbering ==
When the original motorway sections were built in the 1960s, the motorway was numbered south-to-north, with Draffan at its southern terminus with the A74 dual carriageway being junction 1 and Maryville junction 6. When the M74 was to be extended south of Draffan in the 1980s, it was renumbered, in 1984 in preparation for the opening of the southern extension, north-to-south. The Raith or Raith remained as junction 5, while Maryville became junction 4, allowing for later extension northwards, towards Glasgow. The original junction 1 at Draffan was closed, with the first new junction 9 (Blackwood) replacing it, using the southbound carriageway of the old A74 as a slip road. The remains of the semicircular access road to the southbound carriageway are still visible at Draffan Road, with the Blackwood slip road now used as an access road to new housing. In preparation for the extension to meet the M8 south of the Kingston Bridge, in 2010, junctions 1–3 of the First Northern Extension, were renumbered 2A, 3 and 3A to accommodate the new junctions.

== Junctions ==
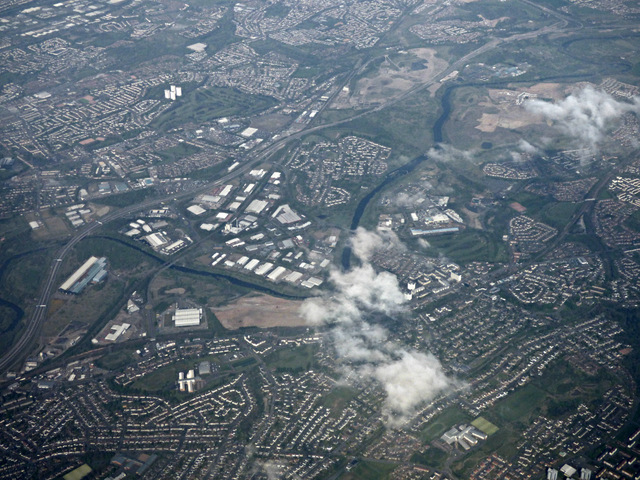
M74 through Cambuslang

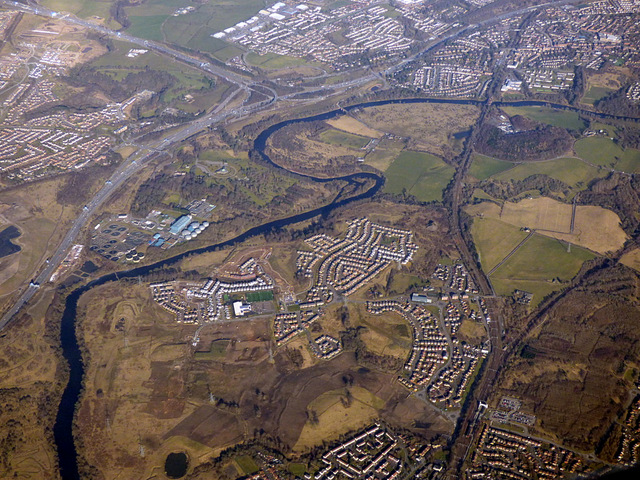
M73 and M74

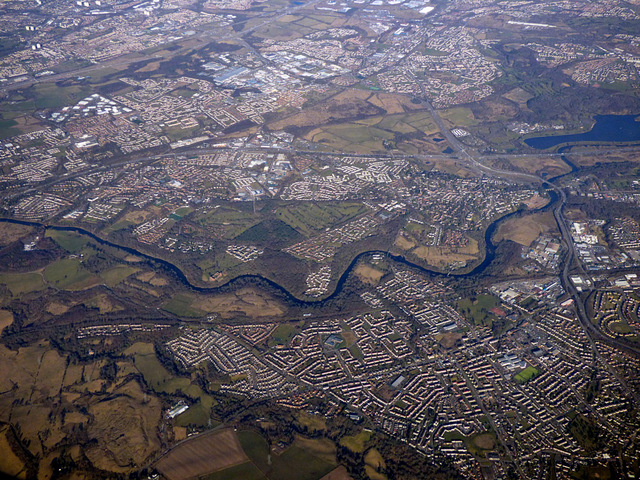
M74 by Blantyre and the River Clyde

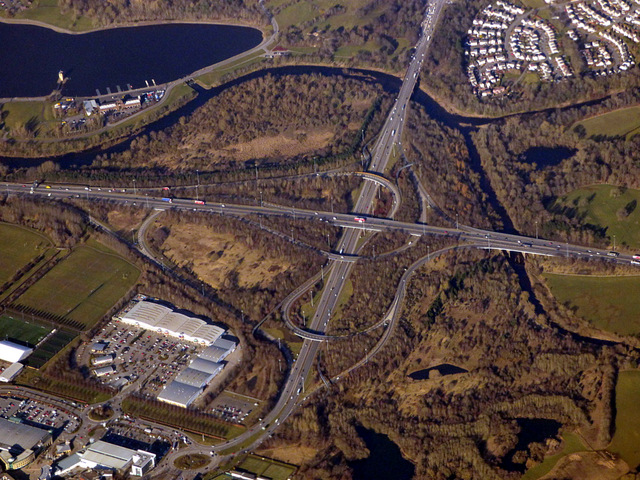
The M74 junction 6 (Hamilton)

A74(M) and M74 motorway junctions
| County | mi | km | Junction | Destinations | Notes |
|---|---|---|---|---|---|
| Glasgow | 0 | 0 | 1 (Note: 55.8515°N 4.2710°W) | M8 M77 – Kingston, Kinning Park, Pollokshields, Tradeston | No exit to M8 Eastbound, no entrance from M8 Westbound (Kingston Bridge) |
| Glasgow | 1.6 | 2.6 | 1a (Note: 55.8378°N 4.2407°W) | A728 – Govanhill, Hutchesontown, Polmadie | |
| South Lanarkshire | 3.4 | 5.5 | 2 (Note: 55.8296°N 4.1980°W) | A724 – Cambuslang, Dalmarnock, Eastfield, Rutherglen | |
| Glasgow | 4.6 | 7.4 | 2a (Note: 55.8355°N 4.1716°W) | A74 – Cambuslang, Eastfield, Tollcross | |
| Glasgow | 5.0 | 8.1 | 3 (Note: 55.8352°N 4.1599°W) | A763 – Cambuslang, Carmyle, Mount Vernon, Shettleston | No Southbound exit or Northbound entrance |
| Glasgow | 6.9 | 11.1 | 3a (Note: 55.8355°N 4.1124°W) | A74 – Broomhouse A721 – Viewpark, Uddingston | No Northbound exit |
| South Lanarkshire | 7.4 | 11.9 | 4 (Note: 55.8326°N 4.1009°W) | M73 – Baillieston, Bargeddie A721 – Broomhouse, Viewpark, Uddingston | |
| South Lanarkshire | 10.3 | 16.6 | 5 (Note: 55.8028°N 4.0536°W) | A725 – Bellshill, Bothwell, East Kilbride, Hamilton | |
| South Lanarkshire | 12.3 | 19.9 | 6 (Note: 55.7798°N 4.0203°W) | A723 – Hamilton, Motherwell, Wishaw | |
| South Lanarkshire | 15.1 | 24.3 | 7 (Note: 55.7535°N 3.9694°W) | A72 – Garrion Bridge, Larkhall | No Southbound entrance or Northbound exit |
| South Lanarkshire | 18.1 | 29.1 | 8 (Note: 55.7141°N 3.9555°W) | A71 – Garrion Bridge, Larkhall, Stonehouse, Strathaven | |
| South Lanarkshire | 21.7 | 34.9 | 9 (Note: 55.6656°N 3.9253°W) | B7078 – Blackwood, Kirkmuirhill, Lesmahagow | Southbound exit only |
| South Lanarkshire | 23.4 | 37.7 | 10 (Note: 55.6501°N 3.8909°W) | B7078 – Blackwood, Kirkmuirhill, Lesmahagow | |
| South Lanarkshire | 28.1 | 45.2 | 11 (Note: 55.5923°N 3.8316°W) | B7078 – Douglas, Rigside, Uddington | No Southbound entrance or Northbound exit |
| South Lanarkshire | 29.4 | 47.4 | 12 (Note: 55.5757°N 3.8139°W) | B7078 – Douglas, Rigside, Uddington | No Northbound entrance or Southbound exit |
| South Lanarkshire | 36.8 | 59.3 | 13 (Note: 55.5034°N 3.6957°W) | B7078 – Abington A702 – Biggar | Road continues as A74(M) |
1.000 mi = 1.609 km; 1.000 km = 0.621 mi: Concurrency terminus; Incomplete access

Coordinate list

A74(M) motorway
| Northbound exits | Junction | Southbound exits |
| Edinburgh A702; Lanark (A73); Abington services | J13 | Road continues as A74(M) |
| Crawford A702 Thornhill (A76), Crawfordjohn | J14 | Crawford A702 Thornhill (A76), Crawfordjohn |
| Moffat, Dumfries A701, Selkirk (A708) | J15 | Dumfries, Moffat A701, Selkirk (A708) |
| Johnstonebridge B7076; Annandale Water Services | J16/Services | Johnstonebridge B7076; Annandale Water Services |
| Lockerbie B7068 | J17 | Lockerbie B7068 Dumfries (A709) |
| Lockerbie B723 Dumfries (A709) | J18 | No access |
| Ecclefechan B7076 | J19 | Ecclefechan B7076 |
| Eaglesfield, Annan B722 | J20 | Eaglesfield, Annan, Kirtlebridge B722 |
| Kirtlebridge, Kirkpatrick Fleming B7076; Canonbie B6357 | J21 | Canonbie B6357; Kirtlebridge, Kirkpatrick Fleming B7076 |
| Gretna Green Services | Services | Gretna Green Services |
| Dumfries, Stranraer, Gretna A75 | J22 | Longtown (A6071); Gretna, Gretna Green B7076 |
| Entry into Scotland | Border | Entry into England |
| Start of A74(M) motorway | M6 J45 | continues as the M6 to Carlisle, Penrith and The South |

== See also ==
- List of motorways in the United Kingdom
