= Johnstonebridge =

Village in Dumfries and Galloway, Scotland

Coordinates: 55.214°N 3.417°W

Johnstonebridge is a village in Dumfries and Galloway, Scotland.

It is roughly halfway between Moffat and Lockerbie, and lies on the A74(M) motorway. The Annandale Water Services on the motorway are in Johnstonebridge; prior to the construction of the motorway there were services on the old A74 road there, one to serve each direction of the road. As with most of Annandale, the area is largely devoted to farming.

It was named after the prominent local landowning family, the Johnstones, who caused a bridge to be built there over the River Annan.

The village of Newton Wamphray lies nearby.

== Governance ==
Johnstonebridge is in the parliamentary constituency of Dumfriesshire, Clydesdale and Tweeddale, David Mundell is the current Conservative Party member of parliament.

It is part of the South Scotland region in the Scottish Parliament, being in the constituency of Dumfriesshire. Oliver Mundell of the Conservatives is the MSP.

Before Brexit, for the European Parliament its residents voted to elect MEP's for the Scotland constituency.

== See also ==
- List of places in Dumfries and Galloway
