= A701 road =

Road in Scotland

A701

Route information
- Length: 71 mi (114 km)

Major junctions
- South end: Dumfries; 55.0714°N 3.6109°W
- North end: Edinburgh; 55.9391°N 3.1794°W

Location
- Country: United Kingdom
- Constituent country: Scotland
- Primary destinations: A780; A75 – A74(M) A708; A72 A721 A703 A6094 A766 A720 A772 A700; A7

Road network
- Roads in the United Kingdom; Motorways; A and B road zones

The A701 is a major road in Scotland that runs from Dumfries to Edinburgh.

== Route ==
The A701 leaves Dumfries and travels north to meet the A74(M) east of Beattock. It then passes beneath the A74(M) before continuing to the north-east towards Moffat and ultimately Edinburgh.

The road can be an alternative to the A7 or A702 routes to Edinburgh from the A74(M) and M6. It is signposted as a scenic route to Edinburgh from the motorway. The A701 is popular with motorcyclists and passes close to the edge of the Devil's Beef Tub. It runs also parallel with the former Talla Railway for several miles.

A relief road for a stretch of the A701 running between Penicuik and Edinburgh has a been proposed and is being phased. The decision has been contested for many years, as the bypass will form a bottle neck back into the current road, and also will cut through an important wildlife corridor, a woodland which is a Site of Special Scientific Interest.
