= Annandale Water services =

Motorway service area in Dumfries and Galloway, Scotland

Annandale Water Services
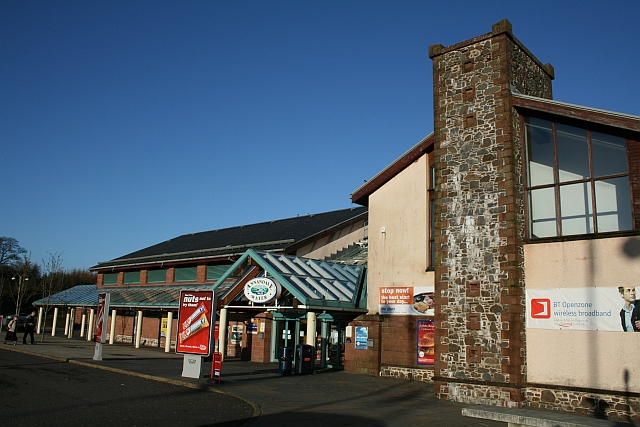
- The main services building

- Location within Dumfries and Galloway

Information
- County: Dumfries and Galloway
- Road: A74(M)
- Coordinates: 55°13′10″N 3°24′34″W
- Operator: Roadchef
- Website: Roadchef Annandale Water

Annandale Water services is a motorway service station in the village of Johnstonebridge, Scotland. The service station is located next to the A74(M) motorway and is accessed using motorway junction 16 in both the northbound and southbound directions. It is owned by Roadchef. The current site was opened in Easter 1995.
