= Rigside =

Coordinates: 55°35′50″N 3°46′49″W

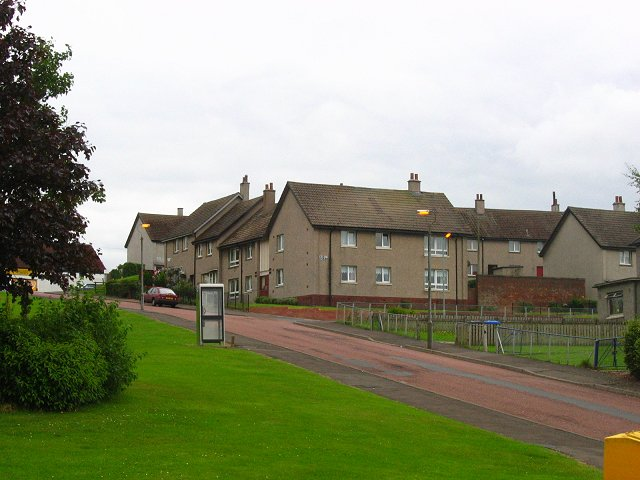
- Beechgrove Street, Rigside

- Location within South Lanarkshire
- Area: 0.24 km^{2} (0.093 sq mi)
- Population: 620 (2020)
  - Density: 2,583/km^{2} (6,690/sq mi)
- OS grid reference: NS879351
  - Edinburgh: 34 mi (55 km) NE
  - London: 320 mi (510 km) SE
- Civil parish: Carmichael; Douglas
- Community council: Douglas Water and Rigside
- Council area: South Lanarkshire
- Lieutenancy area: Lanarkshire
- Country: Scotland
- Sovereign state: United Kingdom
- Post town: LANARK
- Postcode district: ML11
- Dialling code: 01555
- Police: Scotland
- Fire: Scottish
- Ambulance: Scottish
- UK Parliament: Dumfriesshire, Clydesdale and Tweeddale
- Scottish Parliament: Clydesdale

Rigside is a small village in South Lanarkshire, Scotland, about 5 miles (8 kilometres) from the town of Lanark, and less than 1 mi (1.6 km) from Douglas Water. It lies on the A70 road to Ayr, and has approximately 800 inhabitants.

Rigside is a former mining village. The village has one shop, a takeaway cafe, a public house, and a doctor's surgery. The village has very limited public transport links so most of the villagers have access to a car. The village has a nursery and primary school, both located on Muirfoot Road next to the recently upgraded play park and skate park.

The houses in the village are heated in order by ASHP, coal, oil, and LPG. There is no mains gas in the village.

There is a mixture of both private and council owned houses which are being upgraded to ASHP from solid fuel.

== Climate ==
Drumalbin is a Met Office weather station near Rigside, situated at an elevation of 245 m.

Climate data for Drumalbin, Elevation: 245 m (804 ft), 1991–2020 normals
Month	Jan	Feb	Mar	Apr	May	Jun	Jul	Aug	Sep	Oct	Nov	Dec	Year
Mean daily maximum °C (°F)	5.4 (41.7)	5.9 (42.6)	7.9 (46.2)	10.8 (51.4)	14.0 (57.2)	16.3 (61.3)	18.0 (64.4)	17.7 (63.9)	15.3 (59.5)	11.6 (52.9)	8.0 (46.4)	5.7 (42.3)	11.4 (52.5)
Daily mean °C (°F)	2.9 (37.2)	3.2 (37.8)	4.7 (40.5)	6.9 (44.4)	9.7 (49.5)	12.3 (54.1)	14.0 (57.2)	13.9 (57.0)	11.8 (53.2)	8.5 (47.3)	5.4 (41.7)	3.1 (37.6)	8.1 (46.6)
Mean daily minimum °C (°F)	0.5 (32.9)	0.4 (32.7)	1.5 (34.7)	3.1 (37.6)	5.4 (41.7)	8.3 (46.9)	10.1 (50.2)	10.0 (50.0)	8.3 (46.9)	5.5 (41.9)	2.7 (36.9)	0.6 (33.1)	4.7 (40.5)
Average precipitation mm (inches)	93.9 (3.70)	77.3 (3.04)	65.6 (2.58)	49.8 (1.96)	53.7 (2.11)	65.1 (2.56)	79.0 (3.11)	82.0 (3.23)	68.5 (2.70)	99.1 (3.90)	95.3 (3.75)	100.8 (3.97)	930.2 (36.62)
Average precipitation days (≥ 1.0 mm)	15.8	13.7	12.6	11.5	11.6	12.1	13.6	13.8	11.8	14.9	15.6	15.6	162.7
Source: Met Office
