= Covington, South Lanarkshire =

Village and civil parish in Scotland

Coordinates: 55°38′26″N 3°37′44″W

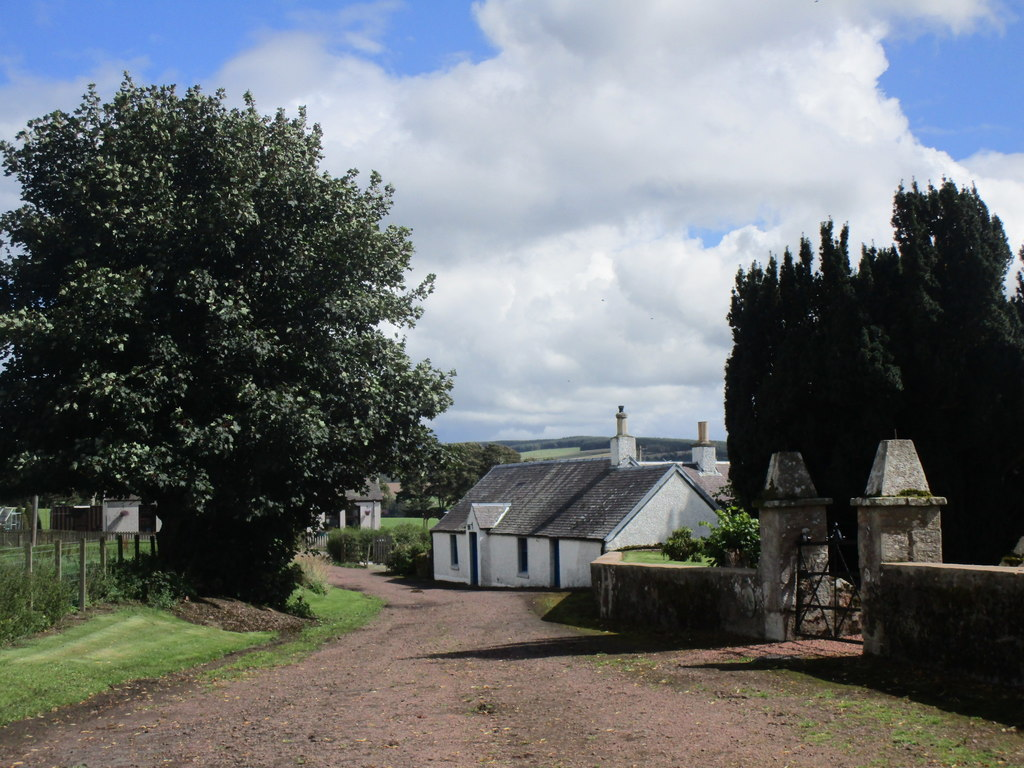
Covington village

Covington is a village and civil parish in South Lanarkshire, Scotland. It lies in Clydesdale, four miles west of Biggar and about 40 miles from both Edinburgh and Glasgow. The parish, which includes the village of Thankerton, had a population of 761 at the 2022 census.

The name Covington was first recorded in the late 12th century in the Latin form Villa Colbani, meaning "Colban's or Cowan's village", and 20 years later as Colbaynistun.

== Notable residents ==
- Thomas Braidwood – early deaf educator in Britain
