= Abington, South Lanarkshire =

Village in South Lanarkshire, Scotland

Coordinates: 55.49365°N 3.68723°W

Abington
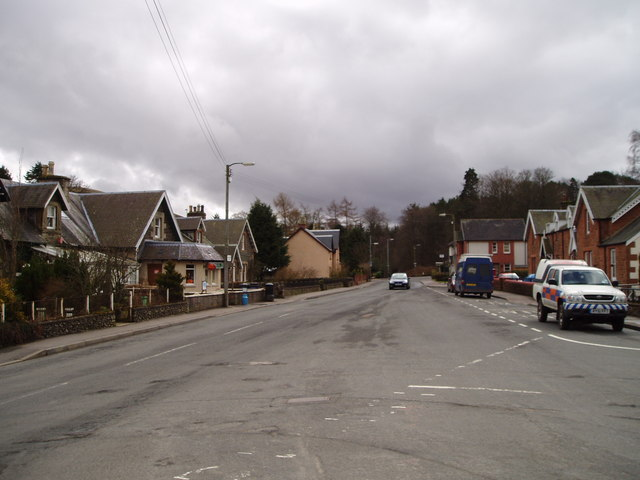
- Abington Main Street

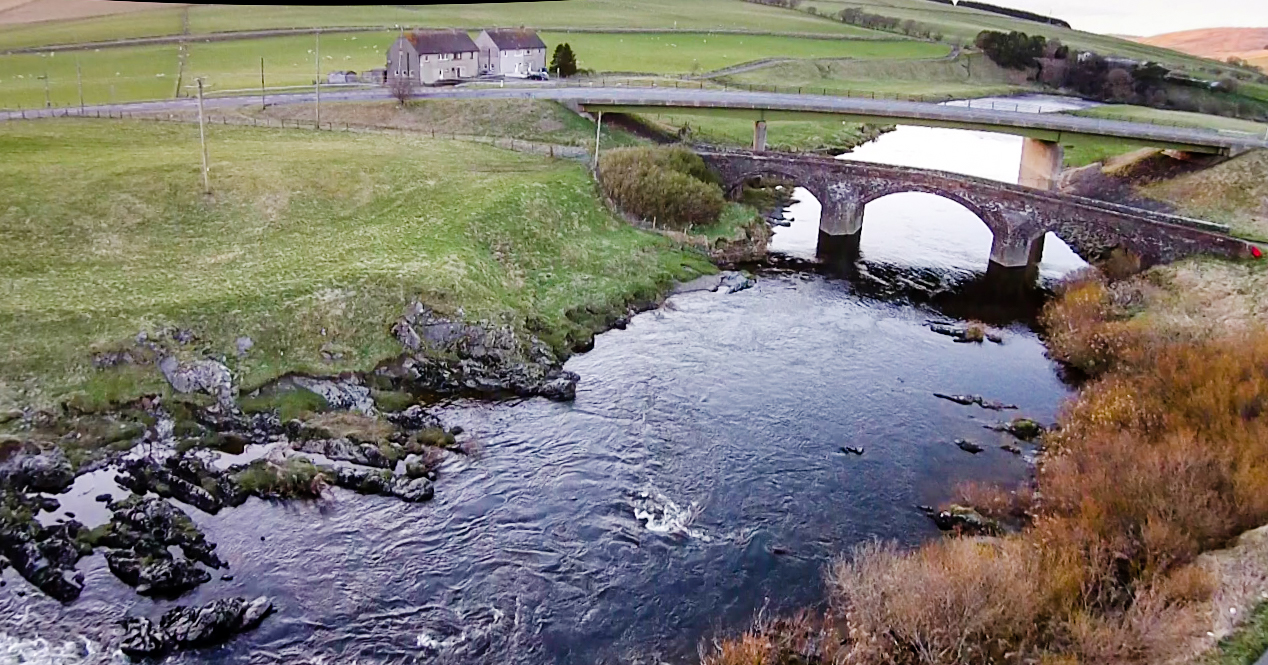
- Clyde Bridges near Abington

- Location within South Lanarkshire
- Population: 200 (2011 Census)
- OS grid reference: NS931234
- Council area: South Lanarkshire
- Lieutenancy area: Lanarkshire
- Country: Scotland
- Sovereign state: United Kingdom
- Post town: BIGGAR
- Postcode district: ML12
- Dialling code: 01864
- Police: Scotland
- Fire: Scottish
- Ambulance: Scottish
- UK Parliament: Dumfriesshire, Clydesdale and Tweeddale
- Scottish Parliament: Clydesdale

Abington is a village in the Scottish council region of South Lanarkshire, close to the M74 motorway, marking the point where it changes name to the A74(M), following the upgrade of the former A74 road. The West Coast Main Line between Glasgow and London also emerges from the Clyde Valley at this point and begins its ascent up Beattock Summit, alongside the motorway. Abington was at one time served by a station on the railway, but this was closed as a result of the Beeching cuts of the 1960s.

There is a post office in the village, as well as the Upper Clyde Parish Church building.

The village gives its name to the Abington services, which lies about 1 mile (1.6 km) north and which is served by Stagecoach service X74 (Dumfries-Glasgow).

This also marks the point where the A702 road meets the A74(M)/M74.

Between 1964 and 1991, the village was the location of a Royal Observer Corps monitoring bunker, to be used in the event of a nuclear attack. It remains mostly intact.

== See also ==
- List of places in South Lanarkshire
