= Eaglesfield, Dumfries and Galloway =

Coordinates: 55.059°N 3.197°W

Eaglesfield: Scottish Gaelic: Achadh na h-Eaglaise
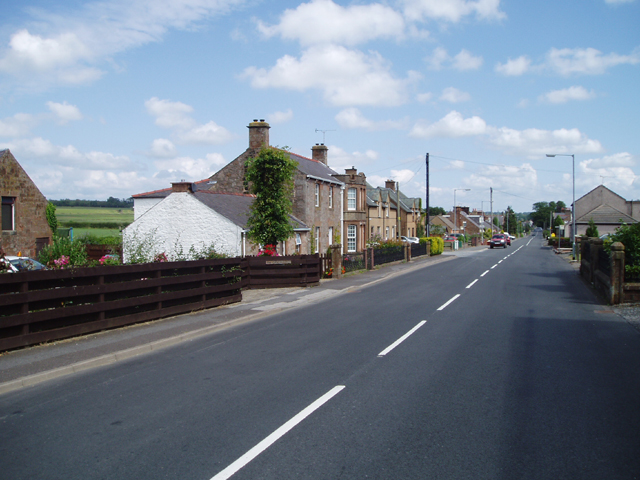
- Long main street of Eaglesfield

- Location within Dumfries and Galloway
- Population: 660 (2020)
- OS grid reference: NY238746
  - Edinburgh: 62 mi (100 km)
  - London: 276 mi (444 km)
- Council area: Dumfries and Galloway
- Lieutenancy area: Dumfries
- Country: Scotland
- Sovereign state: United Kingdom
- Post town: LOCKERBIE
- Postcode district: DG11
- Police: Scotland
- Fire: Scottish
- Ambulance: Scottish
- UK Parliament: Dumfriesshire, Clydesdale and Tweeddale
- Scottish Parliament: Dumfriesshire

Eaglesfield (Scottish Gaelic: Achadh na h-Eaglaise) is a village in south east Dumfriesshire in the local authority area of Dumfries and Galloway, Scotland.

== History ==
Eaglesfield is of ancient origin, and Blacket Tower is the former seat of an old Scottish Borders family, Clan Bell, a sept of Clan Douglas. There is some debate about the origin of the first element of the name which likely derives from the Celtic word for a church, eglwys in modern Welsh, or eaglais in modern Scottish Gaelic (achadh is the Gaelic word for a field, hence the Gaelic name of Achadh na h-Eaglaise).

'Springkell House is a Palladian mansion of 1734. Additions of 1818 by architect Alexander Johnstone, alterations and interior remodelling in 1894.

Many of the buildings in the village are of recent construction, from the 19th and 20th centuries. The village is a good example of a linear settlement, as most of it is in and around a single road.

The nearest town to Eaglesfield is Annan, which is located approximately 7 miles (11 km) away.

The small settlements of Gair and Waterbeck are also close by.
