= A7 road (Great Britain) =

Road in north-west England and southern Scotland

A7

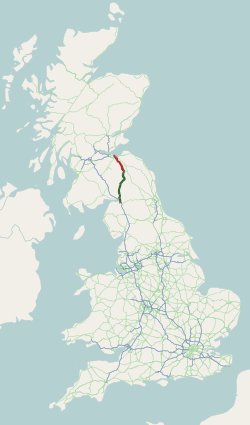

Route information
- Length: 92.4 mi (148.7 km)

Major junctions
- North end: A1 / A8 in Edinburgh; 55.9532°N 3.1891°W
- A720 in Edinburgh; A72 in Galashiels; M6 (J44) in Carlisle; A69 in Carlisle; A6 in Carlisle

- South end: A595 in Carlisle; 54.8954°N 2.9311°W

Location
- Country: United Kingdom
- Primary destinations: Edinburgh, Galashiels, Hawick, Carlisle

Road network
- Roads in the United Kingdom; Motorways; A and B road zones
← A6	→ A8

The A7 is a major road, partly a trunk road, that connects Edinburgh in Central Scotland to Carlisle in North West England. The A7 meets the M6 motorway close to Carlisle, which connects to the English motorway network.

== Route description ==
=== Edinburgh to Hawick ===
The northern terminus of the A7 is the junction at North Bridge with Princes Street in Edinburgh, also the northern terminus of the A1 and the southern terminus of the A900. The road passes Cameron Toll, before meeting the Edinburgh City Bypass at the Sheriffhall Roundabout. South of the bypass, the A7 continues through Midlothian past Newtongrange and Gorebridge. Continuing from Midlothian into the Scottish Borders, the road bypasses Heriot then passes through Stow to reach Galashiels. The A7 becomes a trunk road at the southern boundary of Galashiels. It continues south to Selkirk; a bypass here has been proposed for years but not implemented. This section of the A7 runs parallel to the Borders Railway which opened in 2015; Network Rail and MPs met during construction to mitigate the effect of works traffic on the road.

=== Hawick to Langholm ===
In Hawick the A7 continues along the north bank of the River Teviot to cross the river at the Albert Bridge and follows the south bank of the river towards Langholm, then bypasses Canonbie. South of Langholm the road has been improved, allowing for overtaking.

=== England ===
Continuing across the English border, the A7 goes through Longtown, before meeting the A689 and the M6 at the Greymoorhill Roundabout. The A7 becomes a dual carriageway close to the Kingstown Industrial Estate on the northern fringe of Carlisle. Continuing as a single carriageway road, the A7 crosses the River Eden over Eden Bridge. At Hardwicke Circus Roundabout in the centre of Carlisle, the A7 meets the A595 to the west and southern Cumbria, then continues to form part of Carlisle's one way system through the city centre, meeting the A69 and finally becoming the A6 near Carlisle railway station. The English section was detrunked in 2005.

== Safety ==
In the late 1970s, the A7 was described as being slow and tortuous. It was the 28th most dangerous UK road in 2017. The A7 Action Group was founded in 1990, and continues to lobby for safety improvements to the road, including a bypass of Selkirk.

== Major junctions ==
Note: Junctions are listed northbound from Carlisle to Edinburgh.

County	Location	mi	km	Destinations	Notes
Cumbria	Carlisle	0.0	0.0	Botchergate (A6 south)	Southern terminus; northern terminus of A6
Cumbria	Carlisle	0.3	0.48	A69 east (Victoria Place) to M6	Western terminus of A69
Cumbria	Carlisle	0.5	0.80	A595 south (Castle Way) – The West, City Centre	Northern terminus of A595
Cumbria	Carlisle city boundary	2.9	4.7	M6 / A689 to A69 / A595 – Hexham, Workington	M6 junction 44
Cumbria	Longtown	8.4	13.5	A6071 east (Albert Street) – Carlisle, Brampton	Southern terminus of A6071 concurrency
Cumbria	Longtown	9.0	14.5	A6071 west to A74 – Gretna	To A74 signed northbound only; northern terminus of A6071 concurrency
Cumbria county— Dumfries and Galloway council boundary		11.9	19.2	England—Scotland boundary	
Dumfries and Galloway	No major junctions				
Scottish Borders	Hawick	43.0	69.2	A698 north-east (Mart Street) / Mansfield Road – Jedburgh, Kelso, City centre	South-western terminus of A698
Scottish Borders	Selkirk	52.9	85.1	A699 east / The Loan – St Boswells, Kelso	Western terminus of A699
Scottish Borders	Selkirk	53.7	86.4	West Port (A707 north) to A72 / A708 – Peebles, Moffat	Southern terminus of A707
Scottish Borders	Galashiels	58.5	94.1	A6091 east to A68 – Jedburgh, Melrose, Tweedbank, Edinburgh	Edinburgh signed northbound only; western terminus of A6091
Scottish Borders	Galashiels	60.1	96.7	A72 west (Bridge Place) – Peebles	Eastern terminus of A72
Midlothian	Dalkeith	85.4	137.4	A6094 (Bonnyrigg Road / Eskbank Road) – Eskbank, Bonnyrigg	
Midlothian		85.8	138.1	A768 (Lasswade Road / Melville Dykes Road) – Eskbank, Lasswade, Loanhead	
Midlothian		86.4	139.0	A772 north-west / B6392 (Gilmerton Road) – Eskbank, Gilmerton	South-eastern terminus of A772
Midlothian—Edinburgh boundary	Edinburgh boundary	86.7	139.5	A720 (Edinburgh City Bypass) / A6106 (Old Dalkeith Road / Millerhill Road) to A68 / A1 – Dalkeith, Edinburgh, Airport, Musselburgh, Leith, Dalkeith, Old Craighall, Forth Road Bridge, Glasgow, Stirling, Jedburgh, Berwick-upon-Tweed	Edinburgh, Airport, Musselburgh, Leith, and Old Craighall signed northbound only; To A1, A68, Forth Road Bridge, Glasgow, Stirling, Jedburgh, and Berwick-upon-Tweed signed southbound only
Edinburgh	Edinburgh	90.2	145.2	A6095 east (Peffermill Road) / Lady Road to A701 – City centre, Penicuik, Musselburgh	City centre signed northbound only; western terminus of A6095
Edinburgh	Edinburgh	91.3	146.9	A700 north-west (West Preston Street) / A701 south (Newington Road) / A8 / A90 – Peebles, Penicuik, Glasgow, Forth Road Bridge, Tollcross	No direct access from A7 north to A7 north or from A7 south to A700; information signed northbound only; south-eastern terminus of A700; northern terminus of A701
Edinburgh	Edinburgh	92.4	148.7	A1 south (Waterloo Place) to Princes Street (A8 west) / A900 / M8 / A90 – Berwick-upon-Tweed, Leith, Forth Road Bridge, Glasgow	Northern terminus; eastern terminus of A8; northern terminus of A1
1.000 mi = 1.609 km; 1.000 km = 0.621 mi: Concurrency terminus

== See also ==
- British road numbering scheme
