= List of Sites of Special Scientific Interest in Avon =

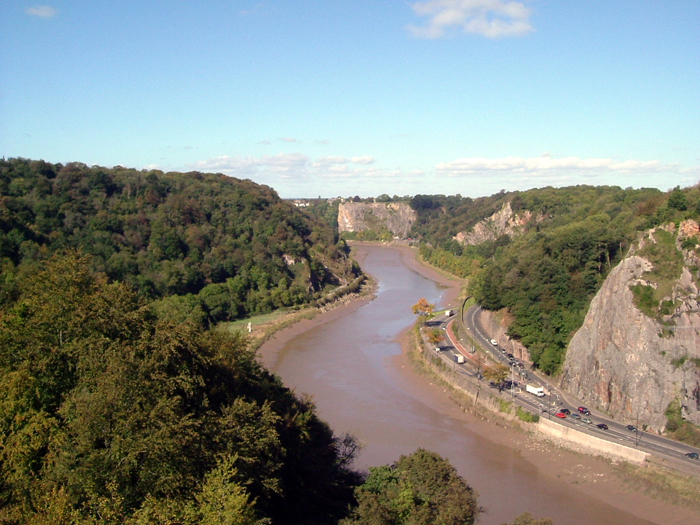
A view of the Avon Gorge, designated as an SSSI for both its biological and its geological interest

This is a list of the Sites of Special Scientific Interest (SSSIs) in the former county of Avon, England, United Kingdom. In England the body responsible for designating SSSIs is Natural England, which chooses a site because of its fauna, flora, geological or physiographical features. Although the county of Avon no longer exists, Natural England still uses its former borders to mark one of its Areas of Search. As of 2006, there are 86 sites designated in this Area of Search, of which 38 have been designated due to their biological interest, 39 due to their geological interest, and 9 for both.

Natural England took over the role of designating and managing SSSIs from English Nature in October 2006 when it was formed from the amalgamation of English Nature, parts of the Countryside Agency and the Rural Development Service. The English counties were revised under the 1974 reorganisation of local government. Until the 2010s, Natural England, which maintains the database of English SSSIs, kept the listing of counties as it was in 1974, but by 2015 they had updated their lists to reflect some later changes. However, even though Avon was abolished in 1996 it is still used as an area of search by Natural England, rather than being divided between the Gloucestershire and Somerset lists.

The data in the table is taken from English Nature in the form of citation sheets for each SSSI.

For other counties, see List of SSSIs by Area of Search.

== Sites ==
Site name	Reason for designation		Area^{[A]}		Grid reference^{[B]}	Year in which notified	Map^{[C]}
Site name	Biological interest	Geological interest	Hectares	Acres	Grid reference^{[B]}	Year in which notified	Map^{[C]}
Ashton Court	✓		210.3	519.7	ST553723	1998	Map
Aust Cliff		✓	5.3	13.1	ST565894	1954	Map
Avon Gorge	✓	✓	155.4	384.0	ST560743	1952	Map
Banwell Caves	✓	✓	1.7	4.2	ST383588	1963	Map
Banwell Ochre Caves		✓	12.5	30.8	ST407593	1983	Map
Barnhill Quarry		✓	3.1	7.7	ST725827	1966	Map
Barns Batch Spinney		✓	0.1	0.2	ST557659	1987	Map
Bickley Wood		✓	9.5	23.5	ST644703	1988	Map
Biddle Street, Yatton	✓		44.8	110.7	ST423648	1994	Map
Bishop's Hill Wood	✓		30.6	75.6	ST733873	1984	Map
Blagdon Lake	✓		212.7	525.6	ST515597	1971	Map
Bleadon Hill		✓	13.5	33.4	ST705943	1999	Map
Bodkin Hazel Wood	✓		10.6	26.2	ST780850	1974	Map
Bourne		✓	8.5	20.9	ST484600	1992	Map
Bowlditch Quarry		✓	0.3	0.6	ST668558	1952	Map
Brinkmarsh Quarry		✓	0.5	1.2	ST674913	1974	Map
Brockley Hall Stables	✓		0.1	0.2	ST471669	1987	Map
Brown's Folly	✓	✓	39.9	98.5	ST793662	1974	Map
Buckover Road Cutting		✓	1.7	4.1	ST665906	1967	Map
Burledge Sidelands and Meadows	✓		48.7	120.3	ST588587	2005	Map
Burrington Combe	✓	✓	139.1	343.8	ST478583	1952	Map
Cattybrook Brickpit		✓	2.2	5.5	ST594835	1989	Map
Chew Valley Lake	✓		565.2	1,396.6	ST570600	1971	Map
Cleaves Wood	✓		40.4	99.8	ST758576	1988	Map
Cleeve Wood, Hanham	✓		8.9	21.9	ST655703	1966	Map
Clevedon Shore		✓	0.4	0.9	ST402719	1991	Map
Combe Down and Bathampton Down Mines	✓		6.2	15.4	ST761625	1991	Map
Compton Martin Ochre Mine	✓	✓	0.9	2.1	ST545570	1988	Map
Congrove Field and The Tumps	✓		12.5	30.8	ST713698	1991	Map
Court Hill		✓	10.5	25.8	ST436722	1997	Map
Cullimore's Quarry		✓	0.9	2.2	ST721927	1974	Map
Damery Road Section		✓	0.5	1.0	ST705943	1974	Map
Dolebury Warren	✓		90.6	223.3	ST455590	1952	Map
Dundry Main Road South Quarry		✓	0.7	1.8	ST566654	1974	Map
Ellenborough Park West	✓		1.8	4.4	ST319608	1989	Map
Folly Farm	✓		3.1	7.7	ST607604	1987	Map
Goblin Combe	✓		51.9	128.2	ST473652	1999	Map
Gordano Valley	✓	✓	161.7	399.5	ST435730	1971	Map
Ham Green		✓	1.1	2.7	ST539738	1990	Map
Hampton Rocks Cutting		✓	1.3	3.2	ST779666	1990	Map
Harptree Combe	✓		13.1	32.3	ST561558	1954	Map
Hartcliff Rocks Quarry		✓	1.6	3.9	ST534662	1991	Map
Hawkesbury Meadow	✓		3.3	8.2	ST754874	1987	Map
Hawkesbury Quarry		✓	0.3	0.6	ST771873	1967	Map
Hinton Charterhouse Field	✓		0.3	0.8	ST764574	1991	Map
Hinton Charterhouse Pit		✓	0.4	1.0	ST772573	1971	Map
Hinton Hill, Wellow		✓	0.3	0.6	ST757582	1996	Map
Holly Lane		✓	0.5	1.2	ST419727	1990	Map
Horseshoe Bend, Shirehampton	✓		4.5	11.0	ST542767	1999	Map
Huish Colliery Quarry		✓	0.8	2.1	ST695542	1985	Map
Iford Manor	✓		0.4	1.0	ST802589	1996	Map
Kenn Church, Kenn Pier & Yew Tree Farm		✓	15.4	38.0	ST415689	1997	Map
Kilmersdon Road Quarry		✓	0.4	1.1	ST689542	1954	Map
King's Wood and Urchin Wood	✓		128.1	316.5	ST454645	1990	Map
Long Dole Wood and Meadows^{[F]}	✓		9.8	24.3	ST610562	1997	Map
Lower Woods	✓	✓	280.1	692.2	ST743876	1966	Map
Lulsgate Quarry		✓	1.1	2.8	ST516659	1997	Map
Max Bog	✓		10.6	26.2	ST406574	1988	Map
Middle Hope	✓	✓	84.1	207.8	ST325662	1952	Map
Midger	✓		65.7	162.3	ST797895	1966	Map
Monkswood Valley	✓		30.7	75.9	ST754710	1990	Map
Newton St. Loe		✓	2.3	5.6	ST715657	1992	Map
Nightingale Valley		✓	5.4	13.3	ST449751	1989	Map
North Road Quarry, Bath		✓	0.3	0.7	ST767646	1990	Map
Plaster's Green Meadows	✓		4.3	10.6	ST532611	1989	Map
Portishead Pier to Black Nore		✓	71.8	177.4	ST474778	1952	Map
Purn Hill	✓		6.1	15.1	ST412630	1990	Map
Puxton Moor	✓		31.1	76.8	ST412630	1994	Map
Quarry Steps, Durdham Down ^{[D]}		✓	<0.1	<0.1	ST573747	1990	Map
Severn Estuary ^{[E]}	✓	✓	15,950.0	39,410.0	ST480830	1976	Map
Shiplate Slait	✓		33.9	83.8	ST365567	1987	Map
Slickstones Quarry, Cromhall		✓	2.7	6.6	ST704916	1966	Map
Spring Cove Cliffs		✓	2.0	4.9	ST310625	1952	Map
St. Catherine's Valley	✓		156.1	385.7	ST760725	1997	Map
Steep Holm	✓		25.5	63.0	ST228607	1952	Map
Stidham Farm		✓	17.3	42.8	ST682684	1991	Map
Tickenham, Nailsea and Kenn Moors	✓		129.4	319.7	ST440700	1995	Map
Tytherington Quarry		✓	0.9	2.2	ST662888	1989	Map
Uphill Cliff	✓		19.8	48.9	ST318583	1952	Map
Upton Coombe	✓		7.4	18.3	ST789877	1989	Map
Walton Common	✓		25.5	63.0	ST428738	1991	Map
Weston Big Wood	✓		37.5	92.6	ST455750	1971	Map
Weston-in-Gordano		✓	12.6	31.0	ST452744	1993	Map
Winterbourne Railway Cutting		✓	2.0	4.9	ST651799	1990	Map
Writhlington		✓	0.5	1.2	ST703553	1992	Map
Yanal Bog	✓		1.6	4.0	ST424607	1988	Map

== Notes ==
^{A} Data rounded to one decimal place.
^{B} Grid reference is based on the British national grid reference system, also known as OSGB36, and is the system used by the Ordnance Survey.
^{C} Link to maps using the Nature on the Map service provided by Natural England.
^{D} Size smaller than can be shown with one decimal place. Actual size: 0.006 (ha.) 0.015 (ac.).
^{E} Incorporates two former SSSIs: Severn Estuary (notified 1976) and part of Brean Down and Uphill Cliff (notified 1952). It was unified as Severn Estuary in 1989. It also overlaps with several other SSSIs:

- Avon: Spring Cove Cliffs, Middle Hope, Portishead Pier to Black Nore and Aust Cliff.
- Gloucestershire: Purton Passage
- Somerset: Brean Down
- South Glamorgan: Penarth Coast

The Severn Estuary extends into two other counties and so can be found on lists of SSSIs in Gloucestershire and Somerset.
^{F} The Long Dole Wood and Meadows site extends into the county of Somerset and so can be found on the list of SSSIs in Somerset.
