= Severn Estuary =

Estuary and Site of Special Scientific Interest in Great Britain

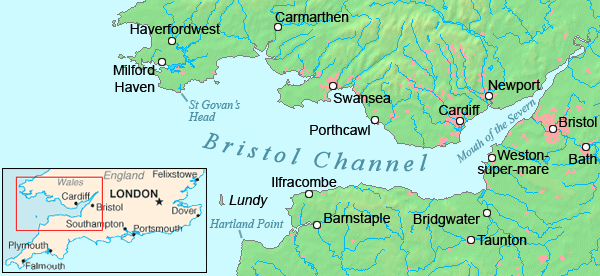
Map of the Bristol Channel and the Severn Estuary (shown here as "Mouth of the Severn")

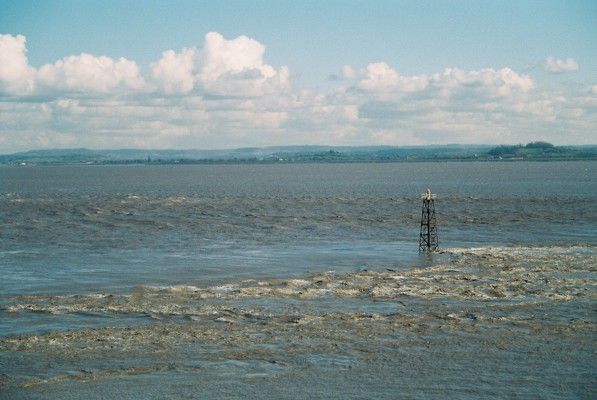
The Severn estuary at Beachley, Gloucestershire, showing the strong tidal currents.

The Severn Estuary (Welsh: Aber Hafren) is the estuary of the River Severn, flowing into the Bristol Channel between South West England (from North Somerset, Bristol and South Gloucestershire) and South Wales (from Cardiff, Newport to Monmouthshire). Its very high tidal range, approximately 50 feet (15 m), creates valuable intertidal habitats and has led to the area being at the centre of discussions in the United Kingdom regarding renewable tidal energy.

== Geography ==
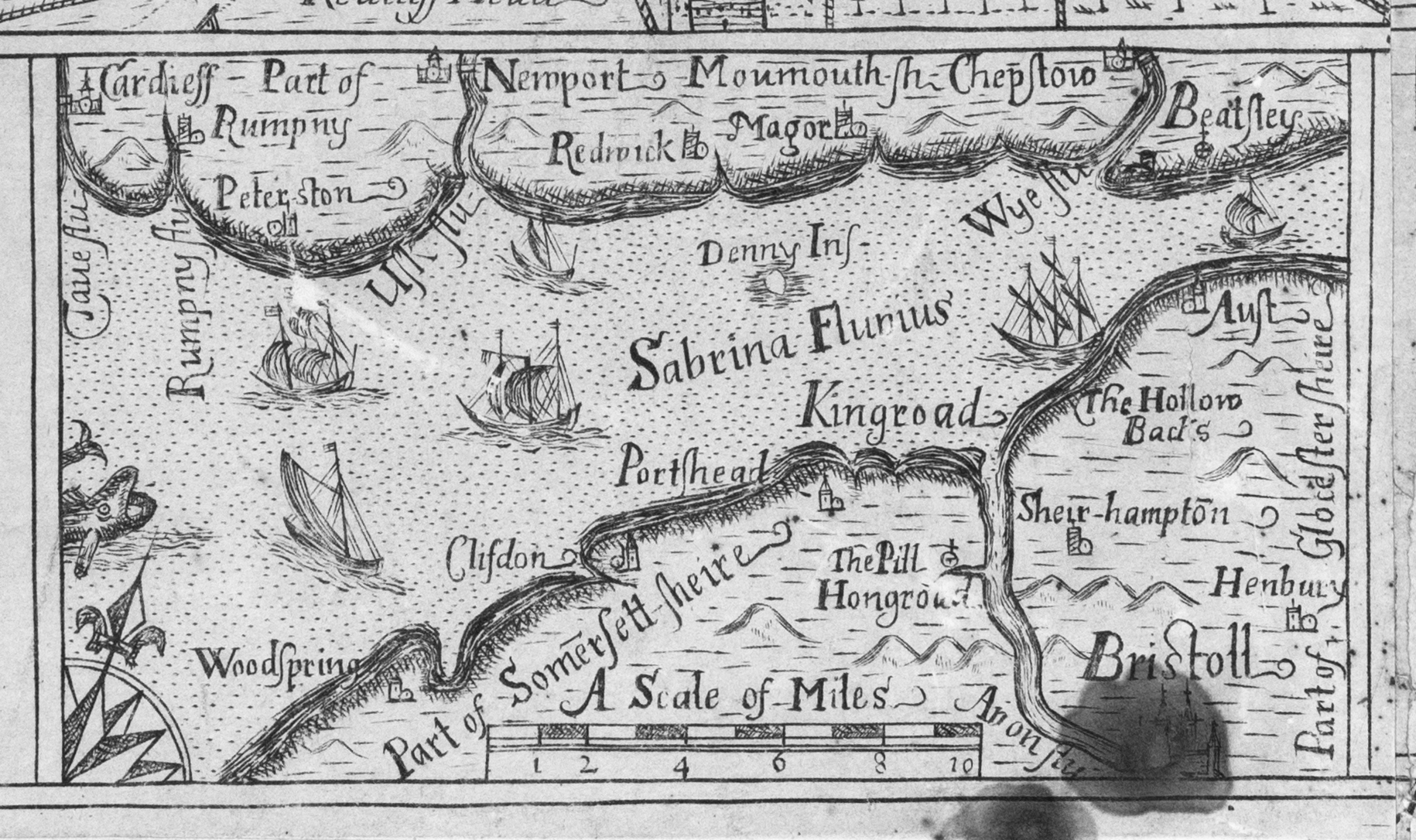
Map of the Severn Estuary and Bristol's region in 1673

Definitions of the limits of the Severn Estuary vary. In pre-modern times the area was commonly referred to as the River Severn, or the Severn Sea. Today, at the upstream boundary, the normal tidal limit of the river is at Maisemore weir (on the West Channel) and Llanthony Weir (on the East Channel), close to Gloucester Docks, although exceptionally high tides can overtop these weirs.

Downstream, the estuary transitions into the open sea of the Bristol Channel. The distinction between the estuary and the Bristol Channel is ambiguous, with some sources treating the estuary as part of the Bristol Channel or drawing no distinction between the two. The Severn Estuary Partnership encompasses an area upstream of Hurlstone Point west of Minehead and Nash Point south of Bridgend. The Living Levels Partnership use a definition that draws the line between Sand Point (north of Weston-super-Mare) and Lavernock Point (south of Penarth), marked by Steep Holm and Flat Holm islands. Lavernock Point is also used as the boundary between Marine Character Areas 28 and 29, named Bristol Channel and Severn Estuary.

Chart of the Severn Estuary, 1693

A narrower definition adopted for navigation purposes by some charts includes only the area downstream of the Second Severn Crossing near Severn Beach, South Gloucestershire. The definition used on Admiralty Chart SC1179 and the Bristol Channel and Severn Cruising Guide is that the estuary extends upstream to Aust, the site of the Severn Bridge.

On the north-west (Welsh) side, the rivers Wye and Usk flow into the estuary, and on the south-east (English) side, the River Avon joins at Avonmouth. West of the Wye, the estuary forms the boundary between Wales and England. On the northern side of the estuary are the Caldicot and Wentloog Levels which are on either side of the city of Newport; and, to the west, the city of Cardiff together with the resort of Penarth. On the southern, English, side, are Avonmouth, Portishead, Clevedon, and Weston-super-Mare. Denny Island is a small rocky island of 0.24 hectares (0.6 acres), with scrub vegetation, approximately three miles north of Portishead. Its rocky southern foreshore marks the boundary between England and Wales, but the island itself is reckoned administratively to Monmouthshire, Wales.

The estuary is about 2 miles (3.2 km) wide at Aust, and about 9 miles (14 km) wide between Cardiff and Weston-super-Mare. It has one of the highest tidal ranges in the world — about 50 feet (15 m). This funnel shape, large tidal range, and the underlying geology of rock, gravel and sand, produce strong tidal streams and high turbidity, giving the water a notably brown coloration. During the highest tides, rising water is funnelled up the estuary into the Severn bore, a self-reinforcing solitary wave that travels rapidly upstream against the river current.

The Bristol Channel in turn discharges into the Celtic Sea and the wider Atlantic Ocean. The islands of Steep Holm and Flat Holm are in the middle of the estuary. The Ordnance Survey refers on its published mapping to a section of the estuary seaward of the two estuarine motorway crossings as the Mouth of the Severn.

== Conservation and SSSI status ==
Severn Estuary
- Site of Special Scientific Interest
- Location near Somerset
- Location of Severn Estuary.
- Area of search: Gloucestershire
- Grid reference: ST480830
- Coordinates: 51.4617°N 2.9965°W
- Interest: Biological/Geological
- Area: 15,950 ha (39,400 acres)
- Notification date: 1976 (Brean Down and Uphill Cliff 1952)

Upper Severn Estuary
- Site of Special Scientific Interest
- Location of Upper Severn Estuary.
- Area of search: Gloucestershire
- Grid reference: SO720060
- Interest: Biological/Geological
- Area: 1,436.8 ha (3,550 acres)
- Notification date: 1954

Designations

Ramsar Wetland
- Official name: Severn Estuary
- Designated: 5 January 1976
- Reference no.: 67

The tidal range results in the estuary having one of the most extensive intertidal wildlife habitats in the UK, comprising mudflats, sandflats, rocky platforms and islands. These form a basis for plant and animal communities typical of extreme physical conditions of liquid mud and tide-swept sand and rock. The estuary is recognised as a wetland area of international importance and is designated as a Ramsar site. The estuary is recognised as a Special Protection Area (SPA) under the EC Directive on the conservation of Wild Birds. The estuary is recognised as a Special Area of Conservation (SAC) under the EU Habitats Directive.

Parts of the estuary have also been designated a Site of Special Scientific Interest. The SSSI includes most of the foreshore upstream from Cardiff and Brean Down and most of the upper estuary as far as Sharpness. The Upper Severn Estuary SSSI covers the tidal river between Purton and Frampton on Severn.

The Severn Estuary SSSI original designation involves the then counties of Somerset, Avon and Gloucestershire in England, and Gwent and South Glamorgan in Wales. The Severn Estuary SSSI designation overlaps individual site designations for separate sites in Avon (Spring Cove Cliffs, Middle Hope, Portishead Pier to Black Nore, Aust Cliff), Gloucestershire (Purton Passage) and South Glamorgan (Penarth Coast). The 1976 designation includes two sites previously notified in 1952 (Brean Down and Uphill Cliff). The SSSI forms the major part of a larger area which includes the Taff/Ely Estuary and Bridgwater Bay (as well as the Upper Severn Estuary)

The Upper Severn Estuary SSSI designation involves the English county of Gloucestershire. The site (Severn Estuary and Upper Severn Estuary) is listed in the 'Forest of Dean Local Plan Review' as a Key Wildlife Site (KWS).

Both SSSI citations provide detail of the geological and biological interest and of particular note is the international importance for wintering and wading birds of passage, and of estuarine habits of outstanding ornithological significance. It is stated that the estuary supports over 10% of the British wintering population and is the single most important wintering ground for dunlin, and for significant numbers of Bewick's swans, European white-fronted geese and wigeon. Nationally important wintering populations are supported such as gadwall, shoveller and pochard.

There are notably seven species of migratory fish which pass through the estuary in both directions. These include significant numbers of Atlantic salmon and common eel. At Black Rock, Portskewett, a traditional method of fishing for salmon with lave nets is practised. The fishermen promote the fishery as a tourist attraction. In 2021, they reduced their activities in response to pressure from Natural Resources Wales to reduce their catch.

== Tidal power ==
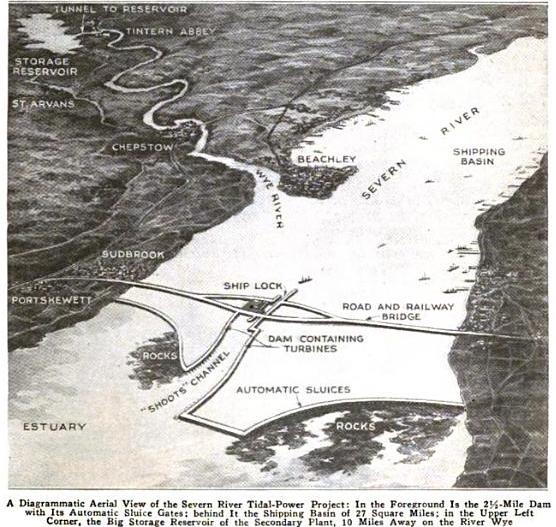
Diagram of a plan to harness tidal power on the River Severn circa 1921. Caption from Popular Mechanics Magazine 1921

Barrage locations considered over the years

A huge tidal range and high level of surrounding industry and population have long made the Severn Estuary and Bristol Channel a focus for tidal energy schemes and ideas. Plans for a Severn Barrage — running 16 km (9.9 mi) across the Bristol Channel from Lavernock Point near to and south west of Cardiff to Brean Down near and just south west of Weston-super-Mare in Somerset — would generate a massive 8640 MW when the tide flows, and have been discussed for several decades now. The power generated would come from a lake of 185 square miles (479 km^{2}) with a potential energy depth of 14 metres (46 ft). Tidal power only runs for around ten hours a day, but by using the enclosed lake as a reservoir of potential energy more hours of operation could be achieved. Other energy sources, such as wind and solar power, also create electricity at times that do not always match when it is needed. Excess energy could be stored by pumping water uphill, as is already done at a variety of other installations in the UK.

The UK Government shelved the plans in the late 1980s due largely to cost issues and local environmental concerns. However, this was before recent huge rises in the price of energy, and before global warming had started to be taken seriously. In April 2006 the Welsh Assembly approved the idea of utilising the tidal power, but the RSPB has raised serious concerns about the effect on the mud flats, that have European Environmental protection status, and the UK government Energy Review published later in the year did not endorse the scheme.

Opinion is still divided on the benefits of a proposed barrage. John Hutton, Secretary of State for Business, Enterprise and Regulatory Reform, announced a further feasibility study on 25 September 2007. The Severn Tidal Power Feasibility Study was launched in January 2008 to assess all tidal range technologies (including barrages, lagoons and others). The study will look at the costs, benefits and impacts of a Severn tidal power scheme and will help Government decide whether it could or could not support such a scheme.

The Severn Estuary has the potential to generate more renewable electricity than all other UK estuaries. If harnessed, it could create up to 5% of the UK's electricity, contributing significantly to UK climate change goals. The proposal for a hydro-electric barrier to generate 8.6 GW and meet five percent of Britain's power needs, is being opposed by some environmental groups.

== Severn Estuary Partnership ==
The Severn Estuary Partnership (SEP) was set up in 1995 as an independent initiative to focus the activities of local government, statutory authorities and interested parties such as farmers and fisherman. Its stated aim is To bring together all those involved in the development, management and use of the Estuary within a framework which encourages the integration of their interests and responsibilities to achieve common objectives. In 2001 SEP published the Strategy for the Severn Estuary, which sets out a plan for the management of the estuary.

SEP uses a geographically extended definition of the Severn Estuary, beginning at the tidal limit of the River Severn in Gloucester and ending at a line drawn between Hurlestone Point near Minehead and Nash Point in the Vale of Glamorgan.

== Archaeology ==
The archaeology of the Severn Estuary is richly varied and of considerable importance, reflecting both the varied nature of the topography and the importance of the river for both fishing and as a maritime waterway. The archaeological resource within the estuary is under threat from natural processes such as coastal erosion, exacerbated by the high tidal range and strong tidal currents, and from threats such as ongoing development pressure along the shoreline, marine aggregates extraction and new coastal defensive and realignment measures as well as proposed major infrastructure projects. An archaeological aerial survey report of the archaeology on the English side is available to view and download from the reference link.

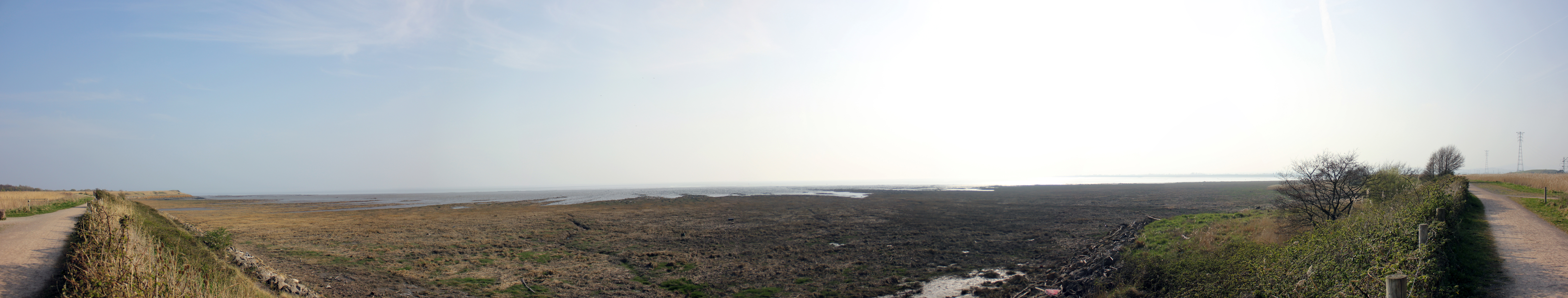
View of Severn Estuary from Newport Wetlands

== See also ==
- Severnside
- Severn Barrage
- Severn Tidal Power Feasibility Study
