= 100 Words Film Festival =

North American film festival

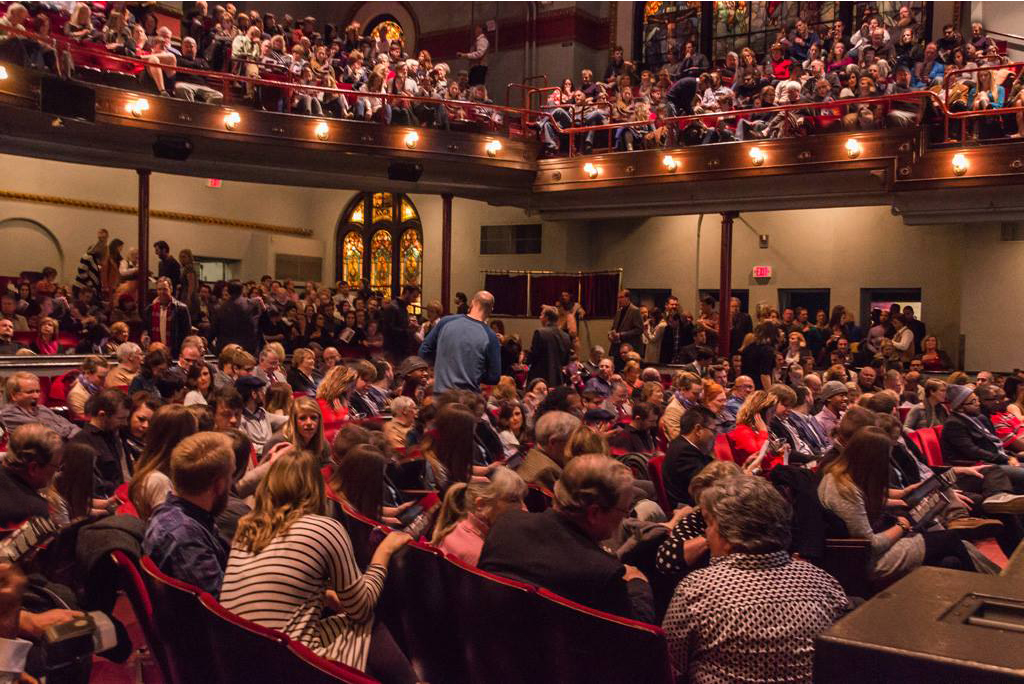
100 Words Film Festival: Sold out crowd at the McGlohon Theatre, Charlotte, North Carolina

The 100 Words Film Festival is an American event held annually in Charlotte, North Carolina. Founded in 2014, it celebrates concise, cinematic storytelling—each film must contain exactly 100 spoken words, requiring filmmakers to focus on the essence of the story. The word limit is a part of the festival's goal to democratize filmmaking by making it financially achievable for nearly everyone.

Called "the visual Twitter" of film festivals by former Saatchi & Saatchi global CEO Kevin Roberts, the festival draws entries from around the world as well as critical acclaim from regional media. "This idea really does force people to rethink the idea of film storytelling, something Hollywood virtually never does any more... Limits liberate the best of these filmmakers, rather than confining them," wrote Charlotte Observer theater critic and culture reporter Lawrence Toppman in November 2015.

Filmmaker Scott Galloway, founder of Charlotte-based media production company Susie Films, is the festival's founder and director.

== 2014 Festival ==
The inaugural edition was held November 22 in front of a sold-out crowd of more than 700 at Charlotte's McGlohon Theatre, with 30 professional and student films. Winning entries:

- Hey Jason (Best Dramatic Film)
- Beyond the Skyline (Best Documentary Film)
- Say No More (Best Student Film)
- Peer Pressure (Best Student Film)
- Hey Jason (Audience Choice Award)

== 2015 Festival ==
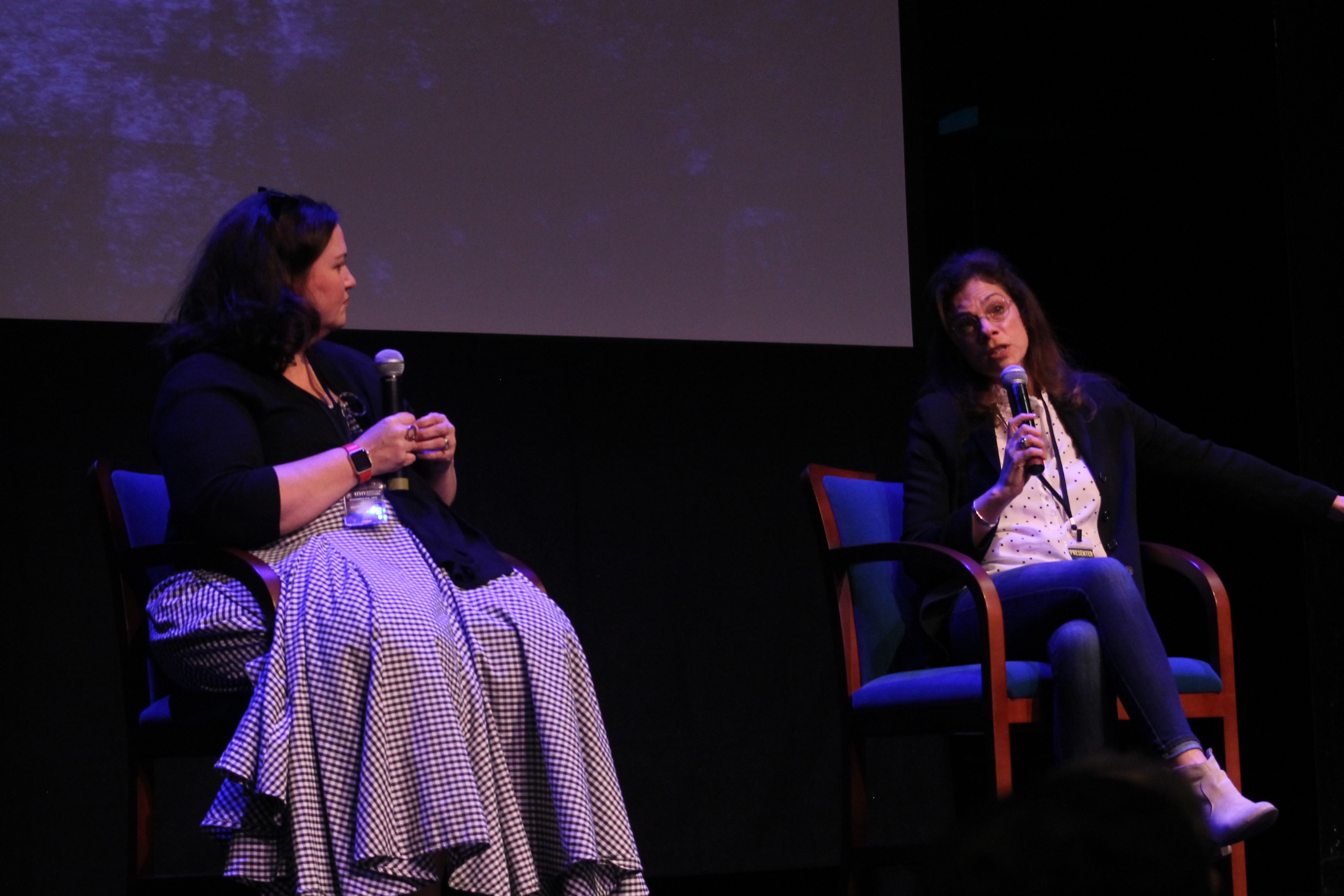
Kristin McCracken (left) and Deirdre Haj (right) give a special seminar at the 100 Words Film Festival.

The second edition returned to the McGlohon Theatre on Nov. 6-7, with 34 films over two nights. Winning entries:

- "Lisa's Baby Advice #1 and #2" by Anna Christopher and Regina Taufen (Best Scripted Film)
- "Water Bedouins" by Yavuz Pullukcu (Best Documentary)
- "To Dream" by Holly Lane, Queens University, Charlotte (Best Student Film)
- "Emily" by Jacob Piller, Lake Norman Charter High School, Huntersville (Best Student Film)

It also included a filmmaker seminar, featuring a conversation with Shadow Distribution president Ken Eisen, actress/filmmaker Karen Young, and Academy Award-nominated documentarian Andy Abrahams Wilson.

== 2016 Festival ==
The third annual 100 Words Film Festival featured 37 short films on November 4–5 at the McGlohon Theatre. Winning entries:

- "The Hidden" by Christopher Baker (Best Scripted Film)
- "Barn Dance" by Ted Richardson (Best Documentary)
- "Monsters" by Candace Frazier (Best Student Film)
- "Insanity" by Walter Mirkss (Best Student Film)

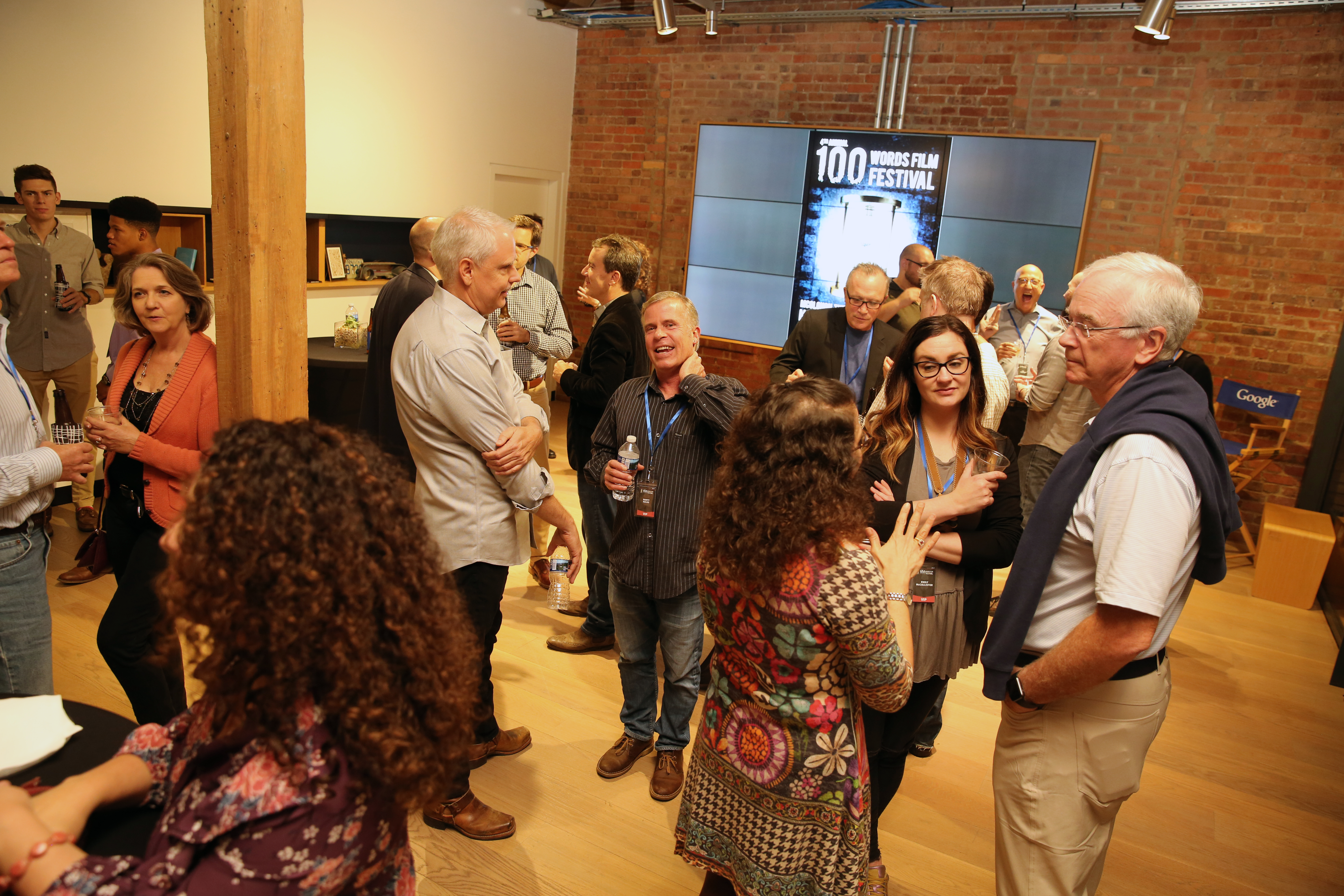
Festival VIP party hosted at the Google Fiber space in Charlotte, North Carolina

The second day of the festival offered seminars from notable guests including Deirdre Haj, executive director of the Full Frame Film Festival, Kristin McCracken, of the Film Festival Alliance, and Robin Canfield, of Actuality Media. Some of the featured filmmakers and guests also participated in a "meet the filmmakers" roundtable.

== 2017 Festival ==
The fourth annual 100 Words Film Festival featured 30 short films on November 3–4 at the McGlohon Theater. The first night screened a collection of 14 of the best films from the previous three festivals. The "best of" collection had recently completed a national theatrical tour—a first in the history of the festival. The second night premiered 16 entirely new short films. Winning entries:

- "Fake Emma" by Kira Bursky and Robert Gowan (Best Scripted Film)
- "Circle" by Yavuz Pullukcu (Best Documentary)
- "My Mom Was A Junkie Too" by Louis Lachance and Justine Prince (Best Student Film)

This year was the first to feature a VIP party hosted at the Google Fiber space in Uptown Charlotte.

== 2018 Festival ==
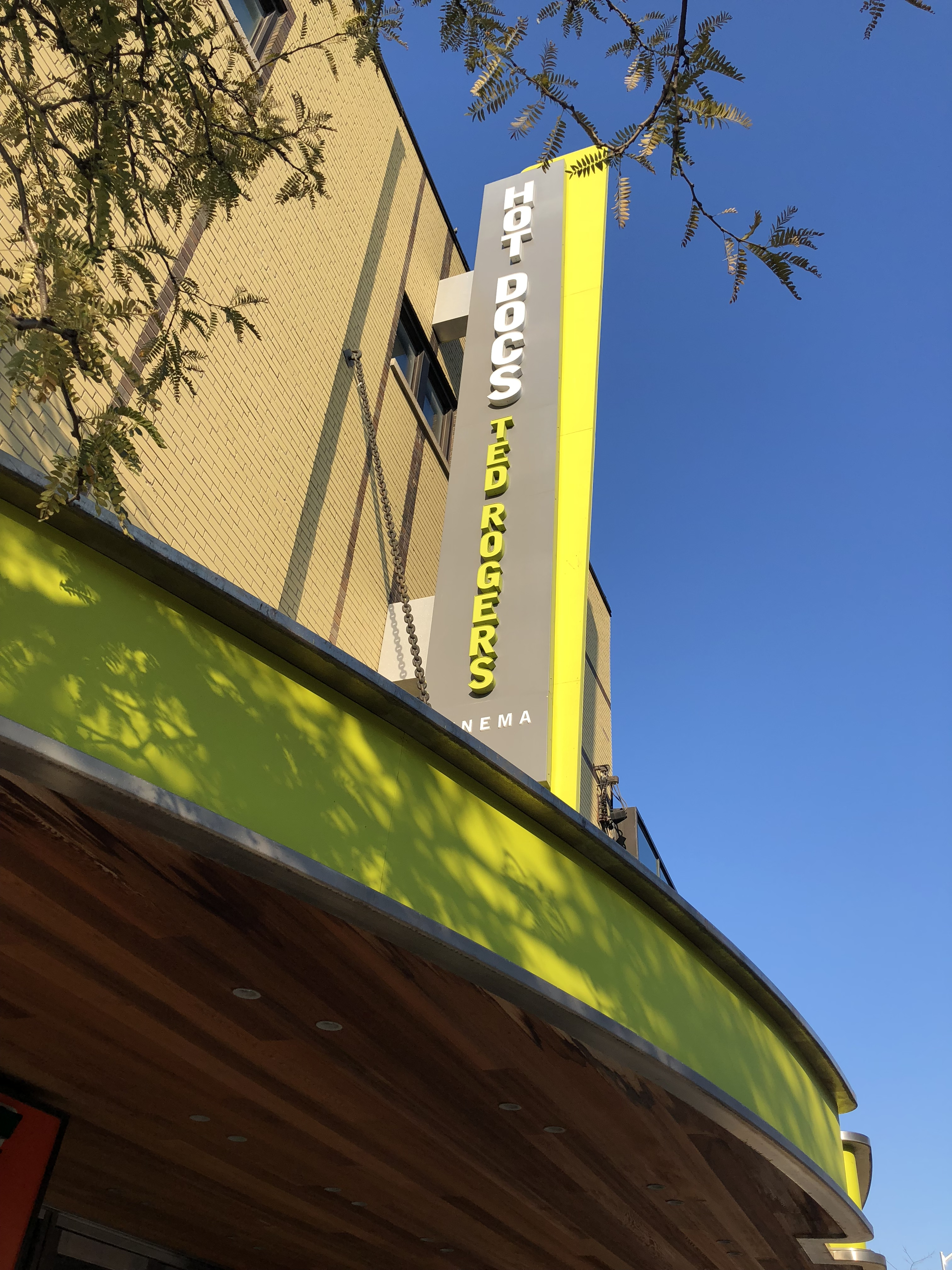
The Hot Docs Ted Rogers Cinema in Toronto, Canada, home to the 5th annual 100 Words Film Festival

The fifth annual 100 Words Film Festival took place at the Hot Docs Ted Rogers Cinema in Toronto, Canada, on October 14. The festival featured 15 new films submitted by filmmakers from around the world, including Canada, the Congo, France, Iran, Ivory Coast, Turkey, Ukraine and the United States. Winning entries:

- "The Snag" by Isabelle Desalos (Best Professional Film): Camille's night at the bar takes a bad turn when the secret she's holding drives a wedge between her and Étienne, the man she's interested in.
- "Lights" by Blaine Pugh of the University of North Carolina at Chapel Hill, William Hinson of the University of North Carolina at Asheville, Andrew Carros of Appalachian State University, and Jacob Ingle (Best Student Film): A widower electrician battles loneliness in the rural countryside while attempting to fix a troublesome light.
