= Feasibility study (disambiguation) =

A feasibility study is an evaluation and analysis of the potential of a proposed project.

Feasibility study may also refer to:

- "A Feasibility Study", a 1964 episode of The Outer Limits
- "Feasibility Study" (The Outer Limits), a 1997 remake of the above episode
- Mining feasibility study, an evaluation of a proposed mining project to determine whether the mineral resource can be mined economically
- Severn Tidal Power Feasibility Study, a UK Government feasibility study into a tidal power project
