= Severn Barrage =

Conceptual dam between England and Wales

Barrage locations considered over the years. The most westward locations, around Ilfracombe and The Gower, are not shown. Black indicates lines of most interest, with associated peak power generation at that location.

The Severn Barrage is any of a range of ideas for building a barrage from the English coast to the Welsh coast over the Severn tidal estuary. Ideas for damming or barraging the Severn estuary (and Bristol Channel) have existed since the 19th century. The building of such a barrage would constitute an engineering project comparable with some of the world's biggest. The purposes of such a project have typically been one or several of: transport links, flood protection, harbour creation, or tidal power generation. In recent decades it is the latter that has grown to be the primary focus for barrage ideas, and the others are now seen as useful side-effects. Following the Severn Tidal Power Feasibility Study (2008–10), the British government concluded that there was no strategic case for building a barrage but to continue to investigate emerging technologies. In June 2013 the Energy and Climate Change Select Committee published its findings after an eight-month study of the arguments for and against the Barrage. MPs said the case for the barrage was unproven. They were not convinced the economic case was strong enough and said the developer, Hafren Power, had failed to answer serious environmental and economic concerns.

== History ==
There have been numerous proposed projects over the years, initially to provide a safe harbour and more recently to generate electricity.

=== Early projects ===
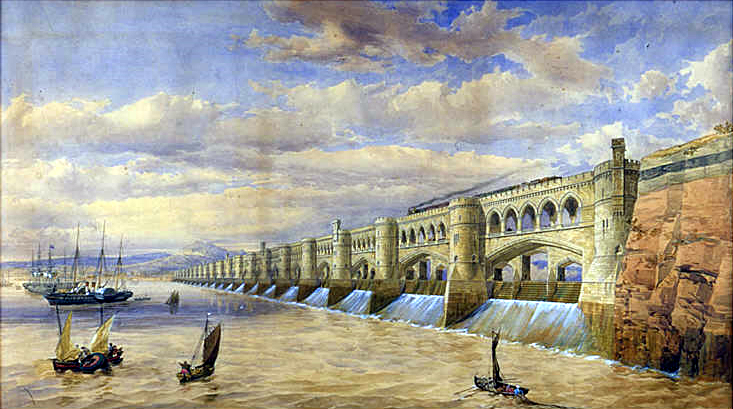
Thomas Fulljames's own impression of his proposed Barrage

In 1849 Thomas Fulljames, a civil engineer and the county surveyor for Gloucestershire proposed a barrage from Beachley to Aust (now the site of the first Severn Bridge), a span of just over 1 mile (1.6 km). Since this was before commercial electricity production, the first proposals were based on the desire for a large shipping harbour in the Severn Estuary, road and railway transport, and flood protection.

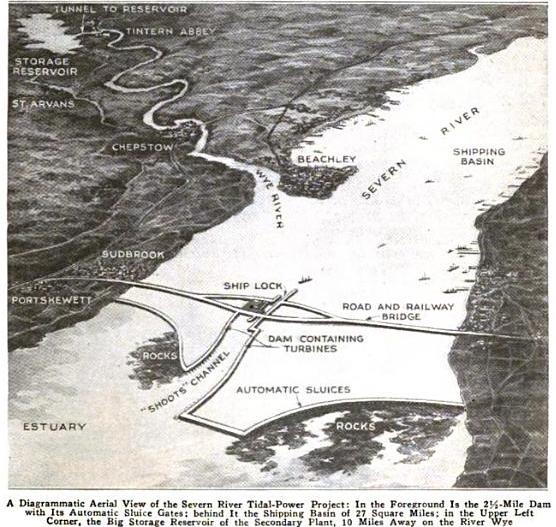
Diagram of a plan to harness tidal power on the River Severn circa 1921. Caption from Popular Mechanics Magazine 1921

No action was taken on Fulljames's proposals and three quarters of a century later, in 1925, an official study group was commissioned. An awareness of the large tidal range of 14 metres (46 ft), second only to Bay of Fundy in Eastern Canada, led to a proposal to generate 800 Megawatt (MW) of electricity at English Stones and although considered technically possible, it was prevented on economic grounds (then costing £25 million). The viability was tested a few years later in 1931 when Paul Shishkoff, a Russian immigrant, demonstrated a 300 horsepower (220 kW) prototype tidal generator at Avonmouth. It included a novel mechanism for spreading the power output over 24 hours. The full barrage was estimated at £5 million at the time.

In 1933 the Severn Barrage Committee Report (HMSO) from a committee chaired by Lord Brabazon recommended that an 800 MW barrage across the English Stones area would be the best option. The work was interrupted by World War II and then revived in 1945 when engineers predicted an output of 2.2 terawatt hours (TWh) per year. A further government study looked at barrage options in 1948 and estimated the construction costs at £60 million. By the time of the next study in 1953 the estimated cost had risen to £200 million.

In 1971 a report by Dr Tom Shaw, a tidal Power expert and advocate proposed a barrage from Brean Down to Lavernock Point. The scheme was estimated to cost £500 million. In 1975 the Central Electricity Generating Board (CEGB), published a study with evidence from Bristol and Salford universities for the Secretary of State's Advisory Council on Research and Development for Fuel and Power. Despite the ongoing oil crisis, the council established that a barrage could not be economically viable unless the energy situation deteriorated significantly.

=== Bondi Committee, 1981 ===
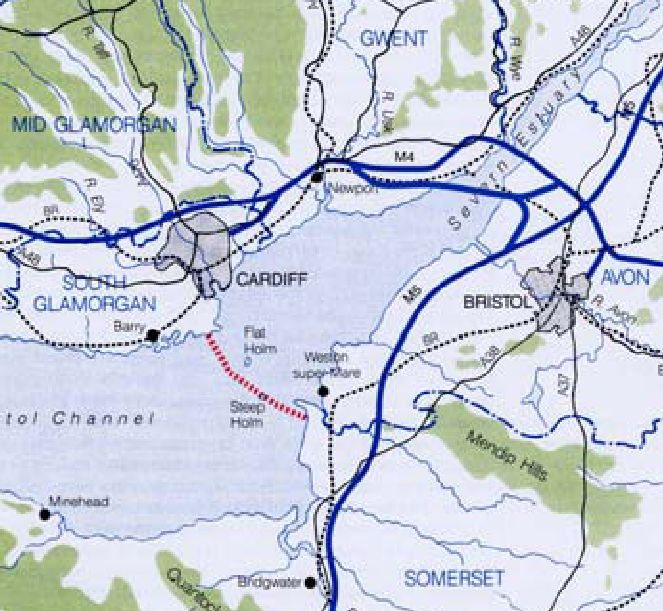
Proposed location of Bondi Committee Barrage

After just such a deterioration (due to the Iranian Revolution and 1979 energy crisis) the plans were reinvestigated by the Severn Barrage Committee in 1981. This committee was known as the "Bondi Committee" (after Professor Sir Hermann Bondi). The committee investigated 6 possible barrage locations, from English Stones at the top of the estuary, down to a location largely at sea in the Bristol Channel between Lynmouth in North Devon and Porthcawl in South Wales. It produced a major energy paper, which recommended a 10 miles (16 km) long barrage of concrete powerhouse between Brean Down and Lavernock Point, sluice and plain caissons together with sand and rock-fill embankments. It would have generated 7,200 MW on the flow of the tides (the largest barrage considered could have produced double that power output). This set of plans was strongly built on a few years later by the Severn Tidal Power Group.

In 1984 George Wimpey Atkins proposed a smaller barrage at English Stones, in the hope of creating a smaller more economically viable project that would avoid the environmental impact of a large barrage.

=== Hooker or Shoots Barrage, 1987 ===
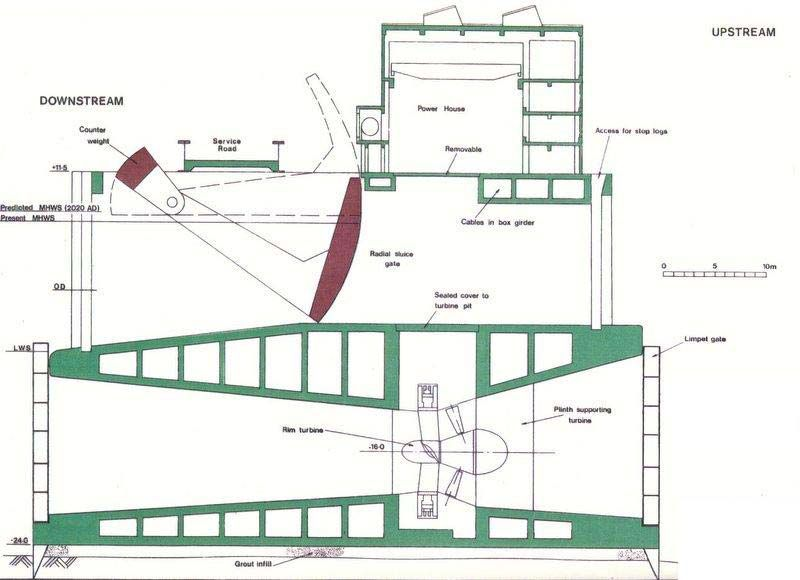
Cross section of Shoots Barrage turbine housing

This Wimpey Atkins 1984 study was criticised because it did not tackle the issue of silting and in 1987 Arthur Hooker OBE (a former partner of WS Atkins) in conjunction with Parsons Brinckerhoff prepared a revised barrage proposed at English Stones to better tackle this issue.

Parsons Brinckerhoff further updated their earlier proposal in 2006 and current estimates for this barrage (now known as the "Shoots Barrage") would cost £1.4 to £1.8 billion to build, and generate 2.75 TWh of power per year. At the highest tidal range, it would develop a peak output of 1,050 MW, and 313 MW output on average throughout the year.

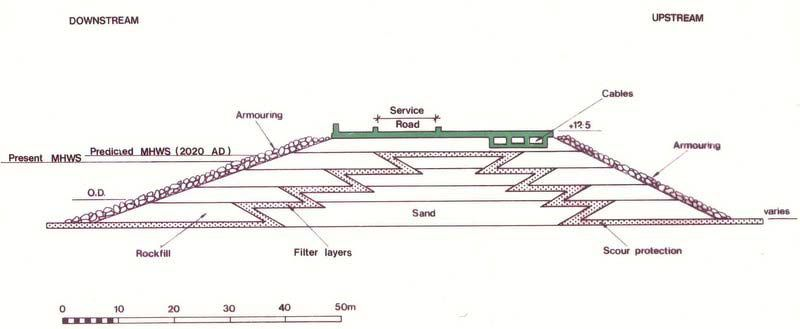
Cross section of embankment

The barrage would be located just below the Second Severn Crossing—i.e. above Cardiff and Bristol on the estuary—and so much smaller locks would be needed for upstream access to Sharpness and Gloucester docks as the large ports of Portbury and Avonmouth would be unaffected.

Like the STPG proposal, Hooker generates only on the ebb tide. Construction time would be four years. It would be built of rock fill embankment at the coastal sides (more like the proposals for "Tidal Lagoons"), but like the STPG would be sluice caissons and turbines with powerhouse in the middle section.

In April 2009 the Liberal Democrats produced a report called "A Tidal Solution—The Way Forward" that backed the Shoots Barrage along with a number of additional measures for power generation in the Severn Estuary. In September 2009 the report was adopted by the Lib Dem party conference as official party policy.

=== Severn Tidal Power Group, 1989 ===
The £4.2 million study by Severn Tidal Power Group (STPG) built on the work of the Severn Barrage Committee, but also examined other possible barrages, and produced another major energy paper. Its members comprised Sir Robert McAlpine, Balfour Beatty, Taylor Woodrow and Alstom. They concluded that the 1981 plans were the best location for a barrage, but calculated that the power output could be larger, at 8,640 MW during flow, or 2,000 MW average power. This would provide 17 TWh of power per year (about 6% of UK consumption), equivalent to about 18 million tons of coal or 3 nuclear reactors. The cost in 1989 was calculated to be about £8 billion (£12 billion in 2006 money—about the same as six nuclear reactors, but different lifespan), and running costs would be £70 million per year (about the same as 1.5 nuclear reactors).

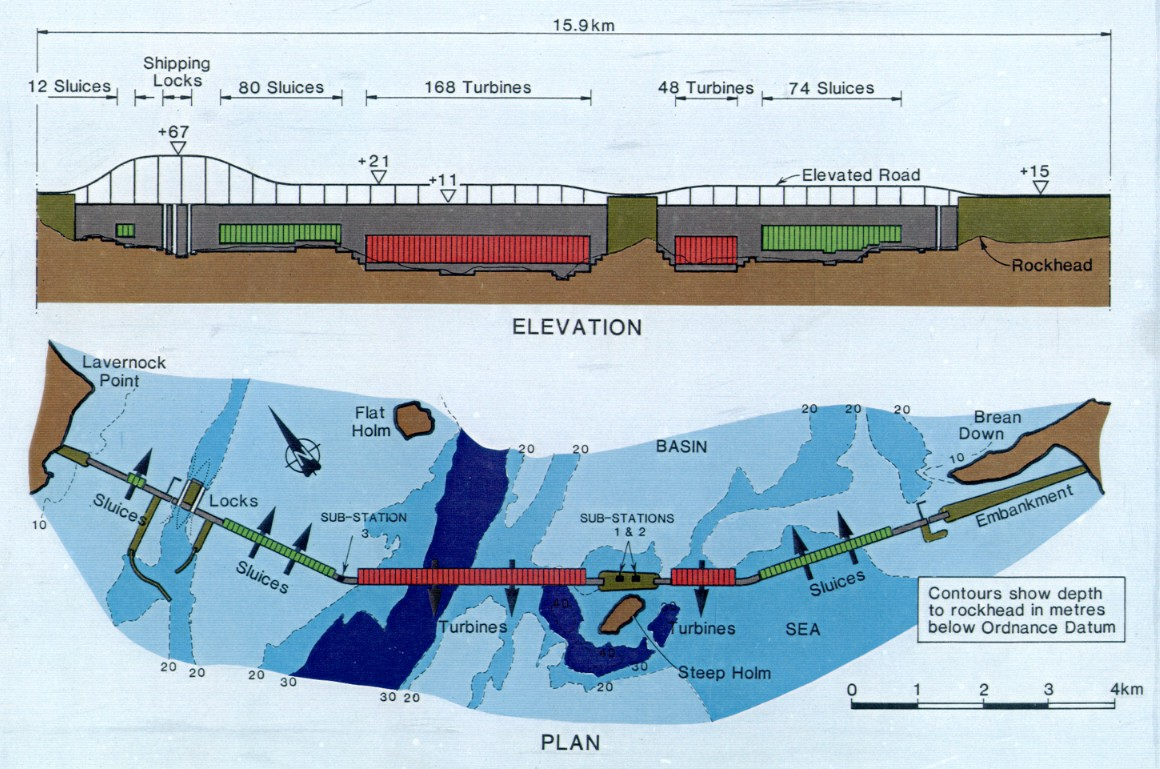
Diagram of the STPG Barrage

The barrage would use existing technology as used in the Rance tidal barrage in France, the Annapolis Royal Generating Station in Canada and the Netherlands sea barrages. Power would be most efficiently generated only in the flow direction, and this effect on tidal range would mean that the tidal extent would be halved by losing the low tide rather than the high tide. That is, that the tide would only go out as far as the current tidal midpoint, but high tides would be unaffected (unless the barrage was deliberately closed to prevent flooding).

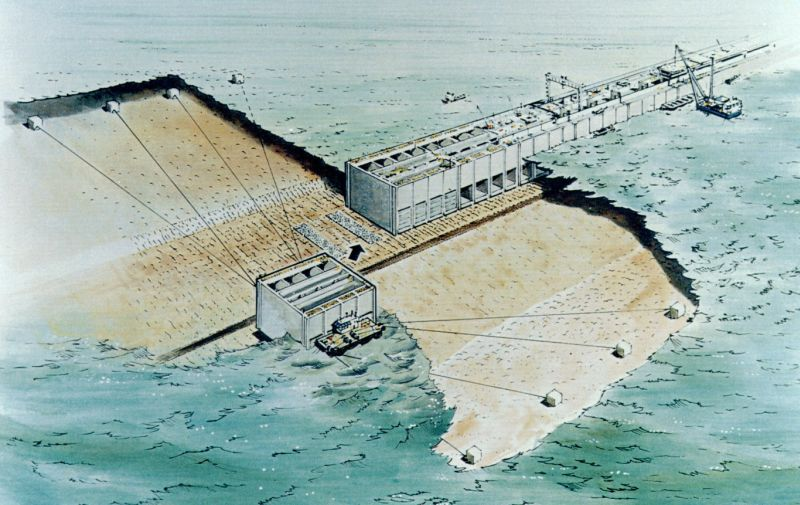
Construction in prefab caissons

The barrage would contain 216 turbines each generating 40 MW for the 8,640 MW total. Arrays of sluices would let the tide in and then close to force it out through the turbines after the tide has gone out some distance outside the barrage. This deliberate building of a head on the water builds pressure that makes the turbines more efficient.

The barrage would contain a set of shipping locks, designed to handle the largest container vessels. Construction would take about eight years and would require 35,000 employees at peak build time. The minimum lifespan of the barrage would be 120 years (about three times that of a nuclear reactor), but could easily be 200 years if decent maintenance was performed.

The STPG appraisal concluded that the electricity generated from the barrage would make the scheme economically viable if given certain "green" advantages, and that the environmental impact was acceptable. Margaret Thatcher's government did not accept this, and shelved the plans. However, since then global warming has radically altered the public perception of environmental damage; and soaring oil, gas and energy costs have made the economics of the barrage much more favourable.

The advent of renewable energy discounts favours electricity generated from "green" sources; and in addition, much lower interest rates make the cost of loans much lower, and long-term financing of such massive projects is now more viable. Consequently, there have been renewed calls for these plans to be re-appraised.

=== Severn Tidal Reef, 2007 ===
Evans Engineering have released plans for what they call a Severn Tidal "Reef". This is a novel structure which aims to overcome the environmental side-effects of a barrage, and can be conceptualised as being half-way between a barrage and a tidal "fence" (a linked string of tidal-stream turbines). The designer, Rupert Evans, had previously worked on a tidal fence proposal, but since dismissed it as unworkable. The reef reduces environmental impact by working with a much smaller "head" of water—just 2 metres (6.6 ft)—thereby reducing the impact of the structure on the estuary water and flow. The smaller head means that the water velocity is much lower and more lower power turbines are required. The load factor will be higher, partly because of the generation being both ebb and flow and the total energy output should (according to a recent report by W.S. Atkins commissioned by the RSPB) be significantly greater than for the Cardiff-Weston Barrage, and is in part a result of siting the structure at the "outer" Minehead to Aberthaw line, which roughly doubles the volume of tidal water available.

=== Sustainable Development Commission, 2007 ===
On 1 October 2007, the UK's Sustainable Development Commission (SDC) published a report looking at the potential of tidal power in the UK, including proposals for a Severn barrage. The report draws on a series of five evidence-based reports, one of which summarises all the available evidence from previous studies on a number of Severn barrage options, but focusing on the Cardiff-Weston and the Shoots schemes. The SDC also commissioned a programme of public and stakeholder engagement, which included a national opinion poll and a series of local and regional workshops.

The SDC gave its support to the building of a Severn barrage, providing a number of strict conditions were met. These include:

- A Severn barrage should be publicly led as a project and publicly owned as an asset to avoid short-term decisions and ensure the long-term public interest
- Full compliance with the EU Habitats and Birds Directives is vital, as is a long-term commitment to creating compensatory habitats on an unprecedented scale
- Development of a Severn barrage must not divert Government attention away from much wider action on climate change

The SDC also raised the challenge of viewing the requirement for compensatory habitat as an "environmental opportunity", through the potential to combine a climate change mitigation project with the adaptation that will be required to respond to the effects of climate change. A publicly led project would enable the use of a low discount rate (2%), which would result in a competitive cost of electricity, and would limit the economic impact of even a very large-scale compensatory habitats package. Electricity production costs are not competitive if a commercial discount rate is applied.

=== UK Government study announced, 2007 ===
A two-year feasibility study was announced in late 2007, and the terms of reference were announced on 22 January 2008, following the publication of the Turning the Tide report from the Sustainable Development Commission. This study builds upon past studies and focuses on a variety of tidal range technologies including barrages and lagoons, and innovative designs such as a tidal fence and a tidal reef in the Severn estuary.

The study, initially led by John Hutton, Secretary of State for Business, Enterprise and Regulatory Reform, was then led until the 2010 General Election by Ed Miliband, who was at that time the Secretary of State for Energy and Climate Change.

The study aims to gather and assess evidence to enable the Government to decide whether it could support a tidal power scheme in the Severn Estuary and if so on what basis. Key work areas involved are:

- The environmental impacts on biodiversity and wildlife; flood management; geomorphology; water quality; landscape and compensatory habitat;
- Engineering and technical areas such as options appraisal; costs; energy yield, design and construction, links to the National Grid and supply chain;
- Economic considerations—financing; ownership and energy market impacts;
- The regional social, economic and business impacts;
- Planning and consents—regulatory compliance; and
- Stakeholder engagement and communication.

The feasibility study concluded its first phase when a public consultation was launched on 26 January 2009. The consultation covered a proposed short-list of potential tidal power project options from an initial list of 10 schemes, processes that were undertaken during shortlisting and the proposed scope of the Strategic Environmental Assessment (SEA). The SEA is a formal environmental assessment of plans or programmes which are likely to have significant effects on the environment. A consortium led by Parsons Brinckerhoff (PB) and Black & Veatch (B&V) has been appointed to manage this part of the project. The process is guided by a stakeholder steering group. The study will culminate in a full public consultation in 2010.

In July 2009 the Government response to consultation confirmed detailed study would be carried out in the second phase on the five schemes that were proposed for short-listing in January. It also announced work to bring forward 3 further schemes that are in the very early stages of development. In September 2010, The Observer reported that the government intended to rule out the possibility of public funding for a complete barrage, while recommending that further feasibility studies be carried out on smaller projects. On 18 October the government announced that the project was being abandoned.

=== Corlan Hafren, 2011 ===
In December 2011 it was reported that the government was talking to Corlan Hafren, a private sector consortium, about a proposal to build a privately financed barrage from Lavernock Point to Brean Down. The Department for Energy and Climate Change said it had received the first draft of a business case for the scheme, and that it was an "interesting proposition". The campaign was led in 2012 by politician Peter Hain. It has been suggested by Atkins that similar schemes could be trialled on smaller estuaries in advance of the Severn, for example the Mersey and Duddon. However the Hafren Power plan collapsed after it was rejected by three independent committees of MPs and by the Government. On 14 January 2014 it was announced that the chairman and Chief Executive of Hafren Power had resigned, putting an end to the Severn Barrage project.

=== Severn Estuary Commission, 2024-2025 ===
The 2022 Russian invasion of Ukraine drew attention to uncertainty about energy supply and uncertainty over external energy costs. A Severn barrage is again being considered and an independent commission was started to research this. If successful, it is claimed that the barrage could supply 7% of total UK energy needs. In March 2025, the Severn Estuary Commission concluded that "development of tidal range energy in the Severn Estuary is feasible".

== Economic impact ==
=== Power generation potential ===
The Severn Barrage plans would provide a predictable source of sustainable energy during lifetime of the scheme, with claims of up to 5% of the UK's electricity output from the 10-mile version. This could reduce the cost of meeting UK's renewable energy targets, and help the UK to meet such targets, including those to tackle climate change. This is because of the few carbon emissions associated with the plan, because unlike conventional power generation, the Severn Barrage plans do not involve the combustion of fossil fuels. A consequence of this plan is that the carbon payback time—the time it takes for saved carbon emissions (those produced by generating the same amount of power in other ways) to outstrip those produced during construction— could be as little as four-and-a-half months, although likely to be around six.

It could continue to operate for around 120 years, compared with 60 years for nuclear power plants. An additional benefit would be to improve energy security.

However, although power supply is predictable, peaks in generation from the barrage do not necessarily coincide with peaks in demand. There are two major tidal cycles affecting power output:

- semi-diurnal cycle: the familiar daily rise and fall of the sea with a full cycle every 24 hours and 50 minutes, with two high and low tides, giving maximum power generation opportunities a few hours after each of the two high tides;
- spring-neap cycle: a 29.5 day tidal range cycle with the lowest power days producing about 25% of the power of the highest power days.

Just under eight hours per day of generation time is expected.

=== Construction costs ===
Estimated costs for existing plans could be as low as £10bn and as high as £34bn. Recent studies have suggested that the smaller short-listed options could be privately financed, and so in effect the matter of cost and risk becomes a private one between the building consortium and their banks. Schemes of the scale of Cardiff-Weston are likely to require significant Government involvement. If the banks feel that a smaller project is viable and decide to lend the money at an acceptable cost of finance then the projects will go ahead (subject to planning and other approvals). None of this cost would directly fall on the tax-payer but any support mechanism for the tidal power would be likely to fall on consumers. There would, though, be secondary knock-on costs from the tidal power project that might be met by the tax-payer, such as modifying existing ports, provision of compensatory habitat and dealing with environmental change. However, these would be offset by the positive knock-on effects, such as flood protection – which would have otherwise also cost tax-payer money. Whether the parties actually decided to exchange money for these knock-on effects would be a matter for Government negotiation.

As a cost comparison, Hinkley Point C nuclear power station (also being built on the Severn Estuary) will cost £25bn, and deliver 3.2GW of power sold at £92.50 per megawatt hour (MWh) of electricity generated for the 35 years of the contract. The Hafren scheme proposers state they would require £25 billion capital investment, and power costs would be £160 per MWh for the first 30 years, and £20 per MWh thereafter. Other schemes have been costed at between £150 and £350 per MWh.

=== Local impact ===
Some say that a large-scale barrage would create leisure-friendly water conditions behind it but with around 10 m rise and fall this would still be one of the largest tidal ranges in the UK bringing with it significant danger to any leisure users. Flood protection would be provided by the barrage, covering the vulnerable Severn estuary from storm surges from the sea. Also higher water levels downstream of the barrage could cause flooding on the Somerset Levels. New road and/or rail transport links could be built across a barrage if demand rises in the future, as outlined below. Any barrage could provide a boost to the local economy – construction industry in the short term, tourism and infrastructure in the long term.

However, shipping would have to navigate locks and the reduced depth of water would prevent much existing shipping from being able to access docks in Wales and Bristol putting thousands of jobs at risk. Other existing estuary industries, including fisheries, would be damaged and jobs lost. All industrial discharges into the River Severn (e.g. from Avonmouth) would have to be reassessed.

== Environmental impact ==
The Severn Estuary is a Special Area of Conservation due to the European importance of its ecology. The inter-tidal area provides food for over 85,000 migratory and wintering water birds, and represents 7% of the UK's total estuaries. There are nature reserves and Site of Special Scientific Interest (SSSI) on the islands of Flat Holm and Steep Holm.

The Barrage was not supported in the 2003 Energy Review due to "strong environmental concerns".

The RSPB opposes any Severn Barrage because of the effect it will have on the feeding grounds that 85,000 birds depend on, stating "The impact a barrage would have is huge. This is one of the most important sites in the UK for wild birds and the chances of them surviving if it went ahead are fairly slim. There would not be enough room left for all the birds and there would not be enough food for those that remained. The estuary is one of the UK's most important sites for water birds and its wildlife value must be taken fully into account."

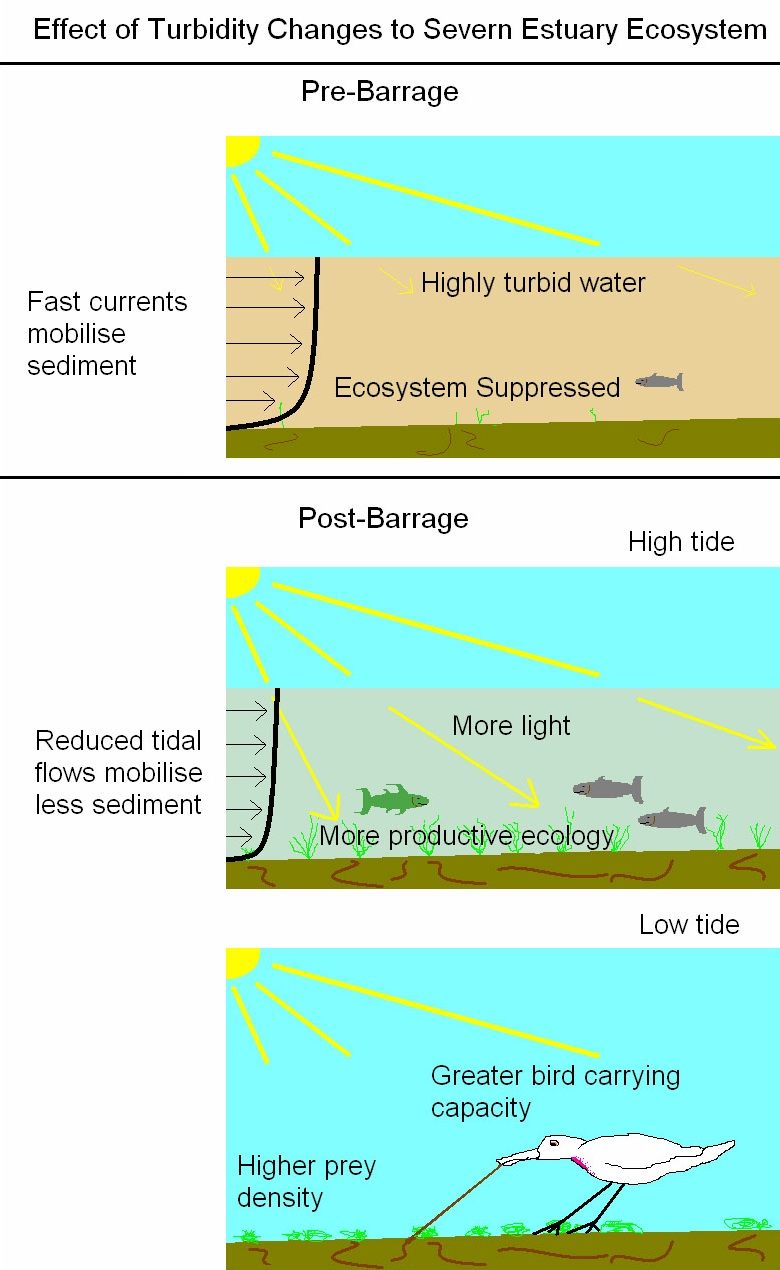
Possible effect of turbidity reductions in Severn Estuary

The present strong tidal currents in the estuary serve to lift up silt sediment and so keep the water thick with fine particles—around 30 million tonnes of suspended sediment move in the Estuary on a high Spring tide. This blocks light-penetration and means that the Severn Estuary marine environment is actually a relative desert, in terms of both plant and fish life. The zone of maximum turbidity is confined to the inner Severn and does not extend westwards into the Bristol Channel. An estimated 6.4 million tonnes/year of sand moves up and down the Bristol Channel which would be blocked by a tidal barrage; the potential environmental consequences of interrupting this flux of sand include local coastal erosion and loss of coastal habitats.

The barrage will not create a "lagoon"—as both opponents and supporters have sometimes claimed. Tidal power stations by definition require that the tide flows through the barrage, but the tidal range in the Severn would be halved. There are claims that the migration of fish would be hampered, but these are contested. The Severn bore would also be eliminated. Any barrage would be likely to stimulate coastal erosion in some areas, and create a negative visual impact upon the landscape (subjective, similar to wind turbines). There would also be negative consequences of the huge amount of concrete (and other materials) needed, with the quarrying of stone likely to impact on other areas.

DEFRA claims that the environmental effects of the barrage still need more analysis before final conclusions can be drawn. The Sustainable Development Commission is investigating UK tidal resources, including tidal power in the Severn Estuary and its environmental impact, and should report mid-2007.

=== Tidal lagoon alternative ===
Friends of the Earth support the idea of tidal power, but oppose barrages because of the environmental impact. They have proposed their own plans based on the concept of tidal lagoons, whereby man-made lagoons in the estuary would fill and drain through turbines. Their proposals would include lagoons covering up to 60% of the area covered by the barrage, which in some smaller configurations would not impound water in the ecologically sensitive inter-tidal areas of the estuary. The lagoons could be sub-divided so power would be generated at more states of the tide than a barrage, with lower peak output, giving economic advantages to set against the higher construction cost of longer barriers. This idea is based on a prototype now being proposed at Swansea bay. However leading figures in the construction industry are sceptical that the lagoons can be economic.

A set of Tidal lagoons known as the "Russell Lagoon concept" were studied and dismissed by the 1981 Bondi Committee report, rejected on the grounds of both economics and environmental damage. Studies suggested that tidal currents around and between the lagoons would become extremely fierce and damaging.

=== Tidal Fence ===
Another possibility is to construct one or more tidal fences across the Severn estuary which would generate power using tidal stream generators. This has been put forward by the Severn Tidal Fence Consortium, and groups including IT Power and a number of industry and academic groups. This would attempt to maximise the potential power generated whilst allowing for shipping to reach Cardiff and Bristol without hindrance (through gaps at least 650 m wide) and wildlife to maintain their existing habitats. The group has now been contracted by the UK government to investigate the idea under the Severn Embryonic Technology Scheme (SETS).

The group estimates that it would cost £3.5bn to construct an outer fence from Aberthaw to Minehead which would generate 1.3GW or 3.5TWh/year. It is also investigating an inner fence from Lavernock Point to Brean Down including Flat Holm and Steep Holm islands. Both fences could possibly be built.

The fence would permit the migration of salmon and would only slightly affect the mudflats used by migrating birds. In addition it could significantly reduce the flood risk in the Severn estuary.

A second approach to a tidal fence being explored by VerdErg uses a different way of generating electricity called the Spectral Machine Energy Converter (SMEC). This uses the flow past Venturi tube sections as a pump without moving parts to create a large secondary flow which drives turbines on the sea bed. Verderg estimate that they could produce output of 13.7TWh/yr at a cost of £9.9bn using the Lavernock Point/Brean Down connection.

Some simulations have also been done on the partial barriers envisaged by Dynamic tidal power which have similar advantages.

=== Effects of different site locations ===
One of the complicating factors in assessing the impacts of a barrage is the large number of possible locations and sizes for the barrage. Generally, the larger the barrage the bigger its environmental impact, and the greater the amount of energy it could transfer—and therefore the bigger carbon offset it could have by way of its renewable power generation.

The largest barrages (sited beyond Hinkley Point and towards Minehead on the English side and Aberthaw on the Welsh side) would significantly affect the entire Severn Estuary and much of the Bristol Channel, but could generate 15 GW peak power and protect the whole of the Somerset levels against flooding and sea-level rise caused by Global Warming. The smallest barrages (sited at Aust/Chepstow) would affect only the river and estuary in Gloucestershire, but would also only generate perhaps 0.75 GW peak power.

A 2009 Paper by Atkins re-evaluated the potential energy which could be generated from the various locations, and concluded that, contrary to earlier studies and computations, the maximum power potential would come from an Ilfracombe-Gower barrage, much further west even than the earlier Minehead-Aberthaw proposals. This was attributed by the study to several calculation elements which were neglected in previous numerical models.

== Trans-barrage transport links ==
It is possible that some types of barrage could be used for transport links between southern England and southern Wales, and more specifically the areas around Weston super Mare and Cardiff but no demand surveys have been carried out to show whether such a link would be useful to commuters or businesses. The east–west position of any future barrage will affect the utility of any transport links across it. Various proposals include a dual carriageway road giving a further crossing in addition to the Second Severn Crossing and the Severn Bridge. The road would have to be taken over the sea locks on a bridge at a height of the Bridge of the Americas (i.e. with a clearance of 61.3 m) if the locks are Panamax-sized.

Some proposals also include a double track railway line across the barrage. A railway would have a longer approach up to a fixed bridge over the locks. The approach would be greatest for non-electrified heavy railway capable of taking freight, slightly less for non-electrified passenger line, and less still for electrified passenger line. There is no electrification presently in the Bristol or Cardiff areas, but this would change with the electrification of the Great Western Main Line. An alternative to a fixed bridge would be a swing bridge, though there is concern expressed at this reducing capacity through the locks and on the railway. However, two swing bridges, one at either end of the lock would mean that one bridge could be kept open to railway traffic at all times. The double track could be reduced to single track at this point without creating too much of a bottleneck, or if double track is required this could be worked around by grade separating the two lines and having double-decked bridges. The line could then be used to partially relieve the Severn Tunnel.

The option for a new fixed rail link has implications for several wider transport proposals. One of the proposed routes for an Irish Sea Tunnel is from Fishguard, which would generate large amounts of extra freight traffic which the current Severn tunnel—already operating at capacity—could not handle. Additionally, a new high-speed rail route has been suggested between London, Bristol, and Cardiff, which faces similar capacity constraints.

If the barrage is built further west, any transport connection would instead link more isolated areas of the Devon-Cornwall peninsula with the cities of South Wales and the ports of Pembrokeshire.

== Opinions ==
=== Backers ===
- The former Prime Minister of the United Kingdom Tony Blair (who backed it in the last weeks of his tenure)
- The Chairman of the Climate Change Committee, Lord Deben, formerly John Selwyn Gummer (who has shares in a company bidding for the project)
- The Welsh Parliament
- Former Welsh First Minister Rhodri Morgan
- The South West Regional Assembly
- Weston Super Mare MP John Penrose
- Former Cardiff Central MP Jenny Willott
- Northavon MP Steve Webb
- Ogmore MP and Parliamentary Under Secretary of State for Wales Huw Irranca-Davies
- Kingswood MP Roger Berry
- Gower MP Byron Davies
- Scientist and "Gaia" theorist Dr. James Lovelock CBE
- Former Welsh Secretary The Lord Hain

=== Opponents ===
- The Commons Welsh Affairs Select Committee
- The Commons Energy and Climate Change Select Committee
- Former UK Science Minister Lord Sainsbury
- North Somerset MP and International Trade Secretary Liam Fox
- The Bristol Port Company
- RSPB Wales
- Friends of the Earth Wales
- World Wildlife Fund Wales
- Gwent Wildlife Trust
- Avon Wildlife Trust
- Political commentator George Monbiot

== See also ==
- Cardiff Bay Barrage
- Centre Port
- Mersey Barrage
- Energy policy of the United Kingdom
- Energy use and conservation in the United Kingdom
- Tidal power
- Tidal resonance
- List of tidal power stations
- Saint Petersburg Dam
- Tidal Lagoon Swansea Bay
