= Monkswood Valley =

Protected area in Gloucestershire, England

Coordinates: 51.43746°N 2.35530°W

- Site of Special Scientific Interest
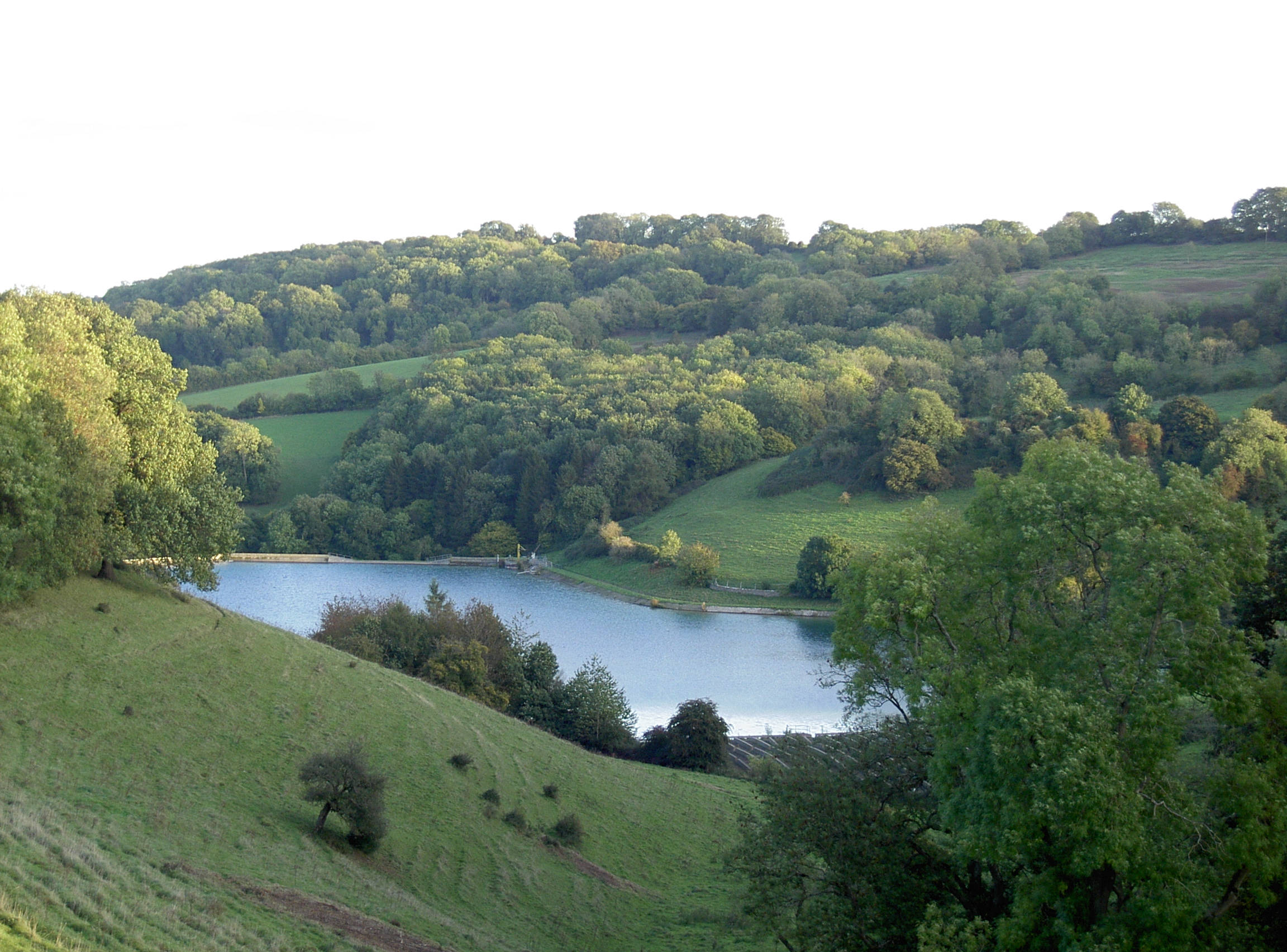
- Location of Monkswood Valley.
- Area of search: Avon
- Grid reference: ST754710
- Interest: Biological
- Area: 30.7 ha (76 acres)
- Notification date: 1990
- Location map: English Nature

Monkswood Valley (grid reference ST754710) is a 30.7-hectare biological Site of Special Scientific Interest (SSSI) near the village of Cold Ashton, South Gloucestershire, notified in 1990.

Monkswood Reservoir, built in 1896 and now owned by Wessex Water, is situated in the valley of the SSSI. The SSSI is woodland and grassland on the sloping land north and south of the reservoir and its tributary.

The woodlands contain Fraxinus excelsior – Acer campestre – Mercurialis perennis (Ash–field Maple–Dog's Mercury) areas, which has limited distribution in Great Britain.

The SSSI has four areas: Monk Woods, Hunterwick Wood & Hartley Wood, Frys Farm and Valley. St. Catherine's Valley SSSI is immediately to the north-east.

The Gloucestershire–Somerset border runs through the reservoir and SSSI. The SSSI is adjacent to the Limestone Link long-distance footpath.
