= Hafren Power =

Hafren Power Ltd.
- Type: Private
- Industry: Renewable energy
- Founded: London, UK (26 August 2010)
- Founder: John Gummer; Joseph Hannah; John Lucas; Anthony Pryor
- Defunct: 2014
- Headquarters: London, UK
- Key people: Richard Bazley; Ian Gardner; Ben Hamer
- Website: as archived in June 2013

Hafren Power (formerly Corlan Hafren) was a tidal energy business formed to promote construction of a Severn Barrage between Wales and England.

== History ==
The company was established in 2010 as a consortium of companies forming a tidal energy business. Its founders included engineering and construction companies, intending to promote the Severn Barrage. It was originally named Corlan Hafren, which means Severn Group in Welsh. As of August 2012 it comprised four companies, Arup, Mott MacDonald, Halcrow and architects Marks Barfield. Halcrow is lead company. Associated companies and persons involved in the project include Atkins, Rolls-Royce, accountants KPMG and Roger Falconer.

Journalist Christopher Booker of The Sunday Telegraph noted in August 2012 that former Conservative Environment Secretary John Gummer was a former director of the company. As of August 2012 one sixth of shares were held by Sancroft International, which is owned by the Gummer family.

The House of Commons Energy and Climate Change Select Committee examined Hafren Power's proposal in 2013, coming to the conclusion:

Although construction of the barrage would be privately financed, Government support would be required for approximately thirty years through Contracts for Difference (CfD) or a similar mechanism. The strike price required by Hafren Power is unknown, but the ability of the project to compete with other low-carbon forms of energy is in doubt. A high strike price risks swamping the Levy Control Framework (LCF), while a strike price below £100/MWh appears unlikely to ensure the project’s economic viability. Hafren Power have failed to overcome the serious environmental concerns that have been raised. Further research, data and modelling are needed before environmental impacts can be determined with any certainty – in particular regarding fluvial flood risk, intertidal habitats and impact to fish. The need for compensatory habitat on an unprecedented scale casts doubt on whether the project could achieve compliance with the EU Habitats Directive.

In 2013 and 2014 several executives and the CEO resigned. Shortly after, Wales Online reported Hafren Power as defunct.

== Severn Barrage ==
In 2010 the company revived proposals for the Severn Barrage from Cardiff to Weston-super-Mare and in 2011 it presented them to the Department of Energy and Climate Change. Former shadow Welsh Secretary Peter Hain and company representatives met with Prime Minister David Cameron in July 2012 to promote the project.

The company said that the project will not require public funding and expected to attract investment from venture capital firms and pension funds. It had sought funding from sovereign wealth funds, stating that expressions of interest have been received from such funds and other investors in Kuwait, Qatar, the UK and elsewhere.

Hafren Power stated the scheme would require £25 billion of capital investment, and estimated power costs were about £100 per MWh for the first 30 years, and £20 per MWh thereafter.
