= Holly Lane =

Holly Lane may refer to:

== Places ==
- Holly Lane SSSI, village of Walton St. Mary, North Somerset, England

== People ==
- Holly Lane (badminton), Irish badminton player
