= Limestone Link =

36-mile footpath in south-west England

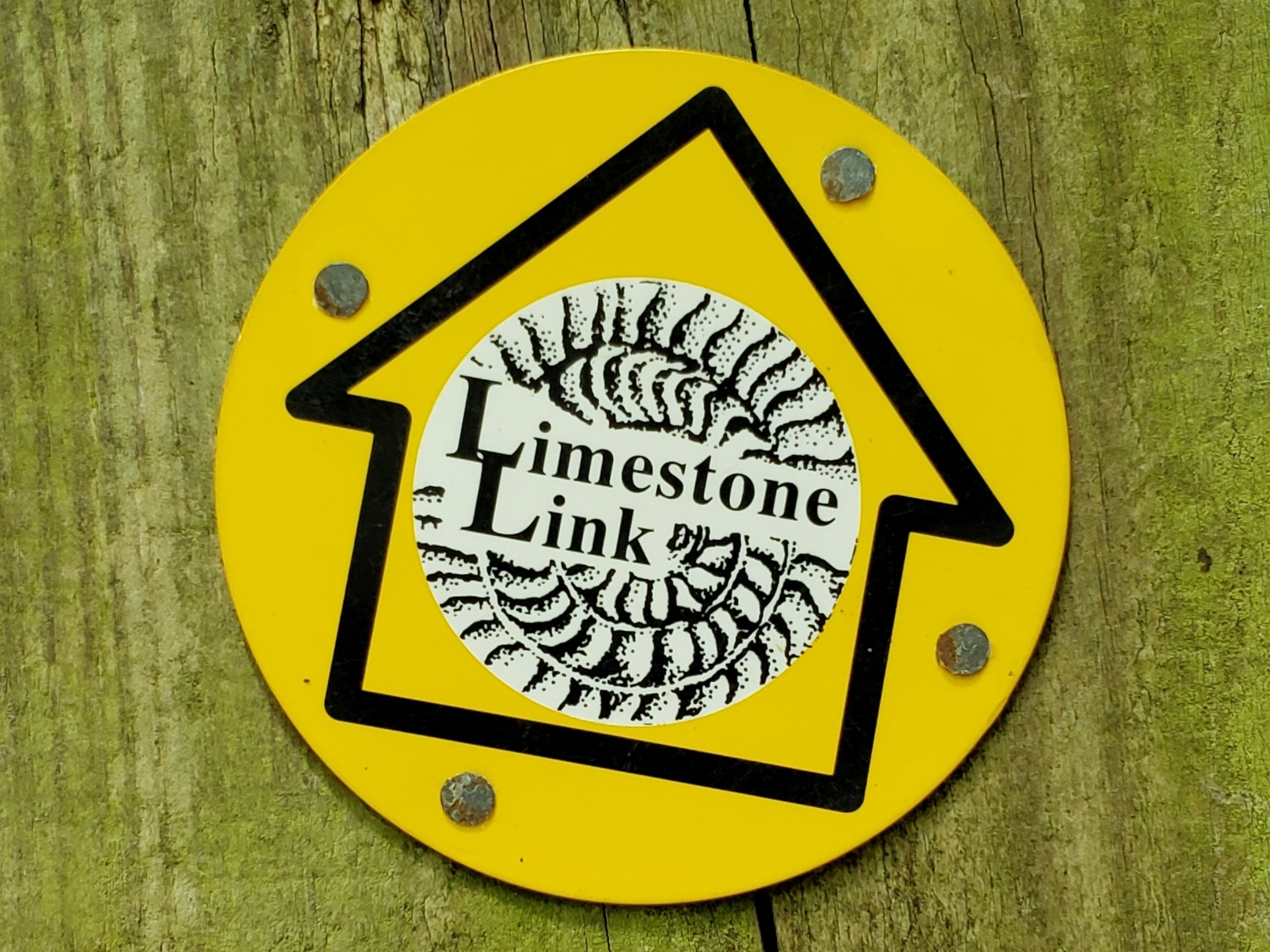
- Footpath waymark sign for the Limestone Link
- Length: 58 km (36 mi)
- Location: South West England
- Trailheads: Mendip Hills / Cotswolds
- Use: Hiking
- Difficulty: Moderate to strenuous
- Sights: Mendip Hills

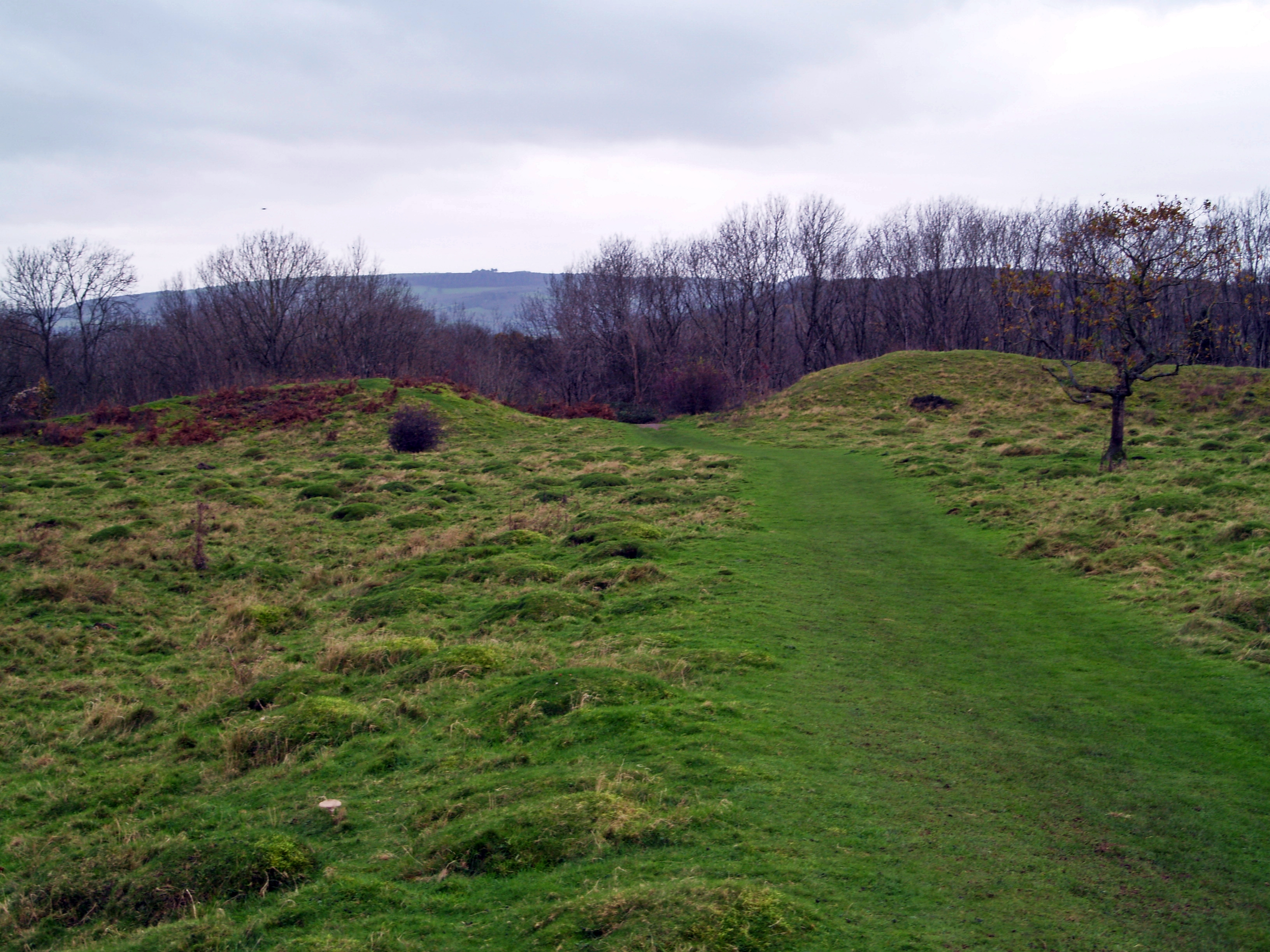
Limestone Link at Dolebury Warren

The Limestone Link is a 58-kilometre (36 mi) long-distance footpath in England, from the Mendip Hills in Somerset to Cold Ashton in Gloucestershire. It is marked by an ammonite waymarker.

The Mendip section starts between Churchill and Rowberrow, near Dolebury Warren and travels roughly west to east, passing above the villages of Blagdon and Compton Martin, close to the northern boundary of the Mendip Area of Outstanding Natural Beauty; it then passes through West Harptree. It passes through Temple Cloud, Hallatrow and Camerton before turning north through Dunkerton and Southstoke, south of Bath.

The path then follows Cam Brook to Midford and then follows Midford Brook before joining the Avon Walkway at the Dundas Aqueduct. It continues north alongside the River Avon and the Kennet and Avon Canal, past Claverton and the Claverton Pumping Station to Bathampton. Here it crosses the A4 and goes through Batheaston and then, following a stream, through Northend and St Catherine. The final part of the path goes past Monkswood reservoir and alongside St Catherines Brook to reach Cold Ashton.

The footpath connects with the Mendip Way and the Cotswold Way.
