= Brinkmarsh Quarry =

Site of Special Scientific Interest in Gloucestershire, England

Coordinates: 51.61957°N 2.47227°W

- Site of Special Scientific Interest
- Location of Brinkmarsh Quarry.
- Area of search: Avon
- Grid reference: ST674913
- Interest: Geological
- Area: 0.5 ha (1.2 acres)
- Notification date: 1974
- Location map: English Nature

Brinkmarsh Quarry (grid reference ST674913) is a 0.5 hectare geological Site of Special Scientific Interest near the town of Thornbury, South Gloucestershire, notified in 1974.

== Sources ==
- English Nature citation sheet for the site (accessed 9 July 2006)
