= Aust Cliff =

5.3 hectare geological Site of Special Scientific Interest

- Site of Special Scientific Interest
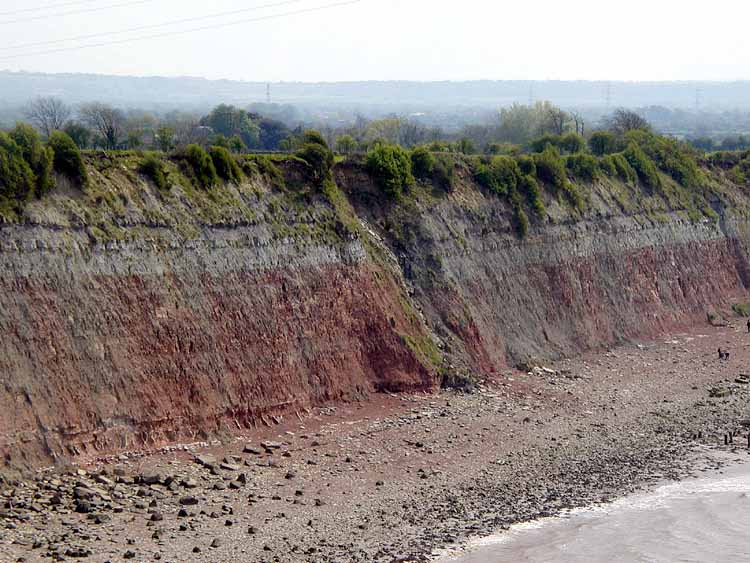

- Location within Gloucestershire
- Location of Aust Cliff.
- Area of search: Avon
- Grid reference: ST565894
- Coordinates: 51.60175°N 2.62947°W
- Interest: Geological
- Area: 13.1 acres (0.053 km^{2}; 0.0205 sq mi)
- Notification date: 1954

Aust Cliff (grid reference ST565894) is a 5.3 hectare geological Site of Special Scientific Interest adjacent to the Severn Estuary, near the village of Aust, South Gloucestershire, notified in 1954. The Severn Bridge crosses the cliff.

Its SSSI designation is due to the presence of fossil beds. The site is famous for its Rhaetic bone bed, and is also the most productive locality in Britain for Triassic insects.

The lower part of the cliff is a red mudstone, with bands of nodules of pinkish-white alabaster. Above the red mudstone is green mudstone, followed by the Rhaetic bone bed at the base of a band of black shale. Above the shale are cream-coloured limestone beds.

== Paleofauna ==
Pterosaurs of Aust Cliff
Taxa	Abundance	Notes	Images
Genus: Dimorphodon; 1. D. macronyx			Dimorphodon
