= Ham Green SSSI =

Protected area in Somerset, England

Ham Green
- Site of Special Scientific Interest
- Location within Somerset
- Location of Ham Green.
- Area of search: Avon
- Grid reference: ST539758
- Coordinates: 51.4765°N 2.6716°W
- Interest: Geological
- Area: 1.1 hectares (0.011 km^{2}; 0.0042 sq mi)
- Notification date: 1990

Ham Green SSSI (grid reference ST539758) is a 1.1 hectare geological Site of Special Scientific Interest near the village of Ham Green, North Somerset, notified in 1990.

This is a Geological Conservation Review site.

The site shows a section through red-brown, gritty, stony silts, with abundant Greensand chert Pleistocene sediments. These deposits appear to be heavily cryoturbated terrace gravels of presumed fluvial origin, although a fluvio-glacial origin has also been suggested.

A number of Acheulian handaxes have been found in the area.
