= Bickley Wood =

SSSI near Longwell Green, Bristol, UK

Coordinates: 51.43058°N 2.51347°W

- Site of Special Scientific Interest
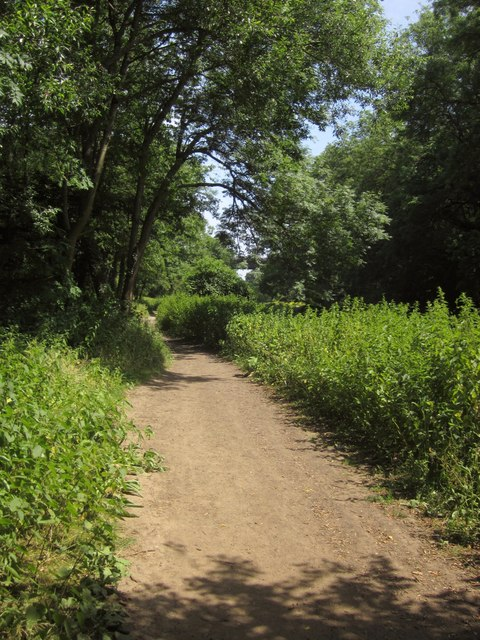
- Location of Bickley Wood.
- Area of search: Avon
- Grid reference: ST644703
- Interest: Geological
- Area: 9.5 ha (23 acres)
- Notification date: 1988
- Location map: English Nature

Bickley Wood (grid reference ST644703) is a 9.5 hectare geological Site of Special Scientific Interest just north of River Avon, near the village of Longwell Green, Bristol, notified in 1988.

== Sources ==
- English Nature citation sheet for the site (accessed 9 July 2006)
