= Damery Road Section =

Coordinates: 51.64672°N 2.42775°W

- Site of Special Scientific Interest
- Location of Damery Road Section.
- Area of search: Avon
- Grid reference: ST705943
- Interest: Geological
- Area: 0.5 ha (1.2 acres)
- Notification date: 1974
- Location map: English Nature

Damery Road Section (grid reference ST705943) is a 0.5-hectare (1.2-acre) geological Site of Special Scientific Interest north of Tortworth, South Gloucestershire, notified in 1974.

== Sources ==
- English Nature citation sheet for the site (accessed 9 July 2006)
