= North Road Quarry, Bath =

Geological Site of Special Scientific Interest in Somerset, England

- Site of Special Scientific Interest
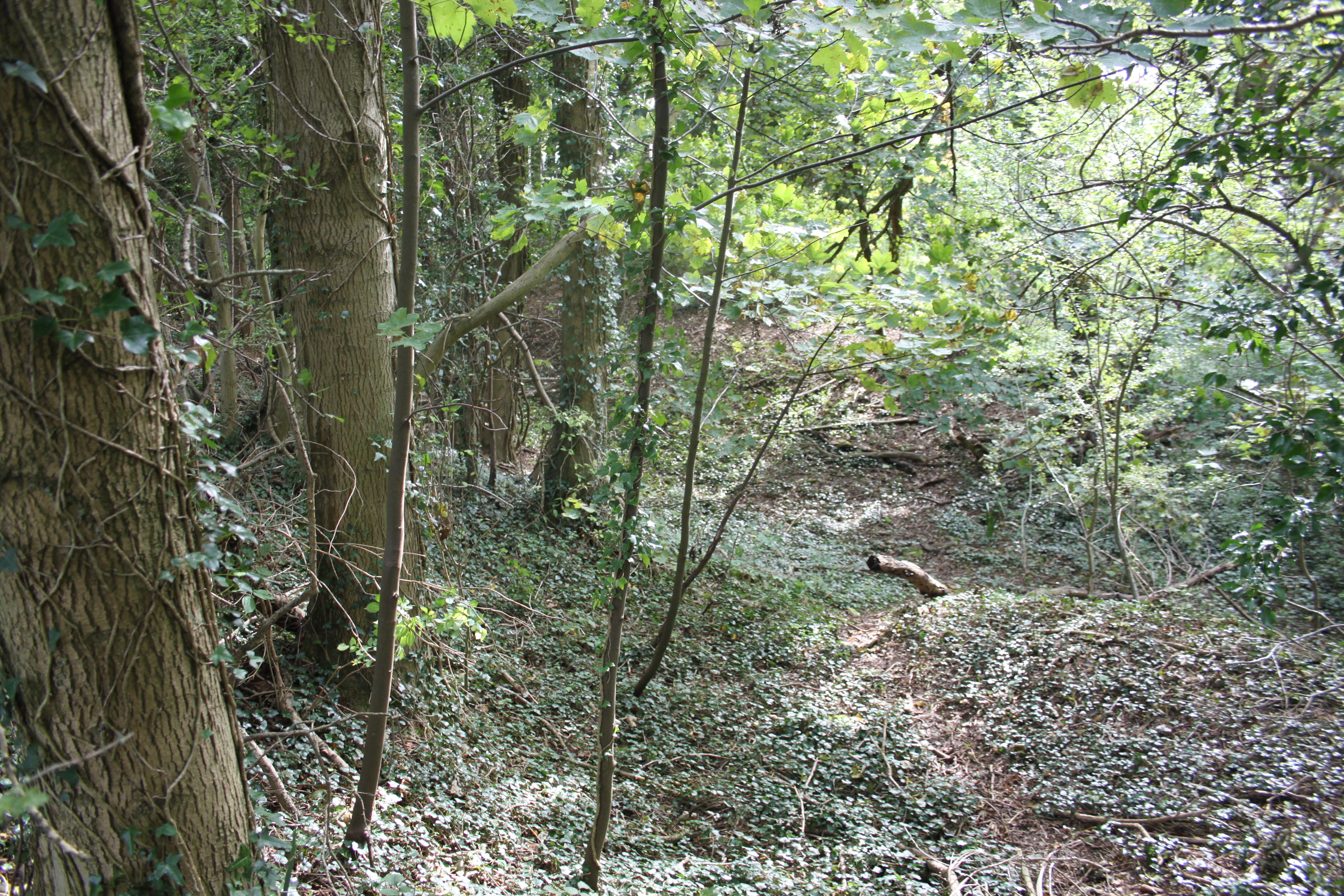

- Location within Somerset
- Location of North Road Quarry, Bath.
- Area of search: Avon
- Grid reference: ST767646
- Coordinates: 51.37997°N 2.33617°W
- Interest: Geological
- Area: 0.3 hectares (0.0030 km^{2}; 0.0012 sq mi)
- Notification date: 1990

North Road Quarry, Bath (grid reference ST767646) is a 0.3 hectare geological Site of Special Scientific Interest close to Sham Castle in the city of Bath, Somerset, notified in 1990.

It is a Geological Conservation Review site because it contains an exposure of Oolite, which shows a very clear example of dip-and-fault structure. In addition it reveals Pleistocene 'plateaugravels' made up of flint, chert, limestone, coal, shales, sandstone and conglomerate, sometimes in a silty matrix, sometimes clast supported.
