= Hawkesbury Meadow =

Coordinates: 51.58491°N 2.35645°W

- Site of Special Scientific Interest
- Location of Hawkesbury Meadow.
- Area of search: Avon
- Grid reference: ST754874
- Interest: Biological
- Area: 3.3 ha (8.2 acres)
- Notification date: 1987
- Location map: English Nature

Hawkesbury Meadow (grid reference ST754874) is a 3.3 hectare biological Site of Special Scientific Interest (SSSI) in South Gloucestershire, notified in 1987.

== Sources ==
- English Nature citation sheet for the site (accessed on 16 July 2006)
