= Barnhill Quarry =

Site of Special Scientific Interest in Gloucestershire, England

- Site of Special Scientific Interest
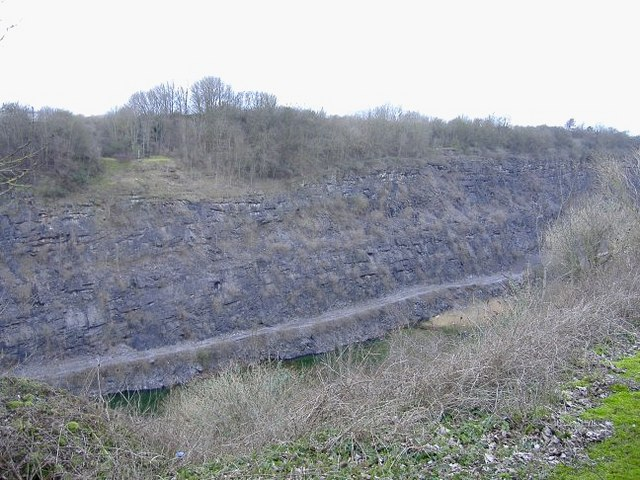

- Location within Gloucestershire
- Location of Barnhill Quarry.
- Area of search: Avon
- Grid reference: ST725827
- Coordinates: 51.54252°N 2.39793°W
- Interest: Geological
- Area: 3.1 ha (7.7 acres)
- Notification date: 1966
- Location map: English Nature

Barnhill Quarry (grid reference ST725827) is a 3.1 hectare geological Site of Special Scientific Interest near Chipping Sodbury, South Gloucestershire, notified in 1966.

== Sources ==
- English Nature citation sheet for the site (accessed 9 July 2006)
