= Quarry Steps, Durdham Down =

Quarry in Bristol, England

Coordinates: 51.46965°N 2.61613°W

- Site of Special Scientific Interest
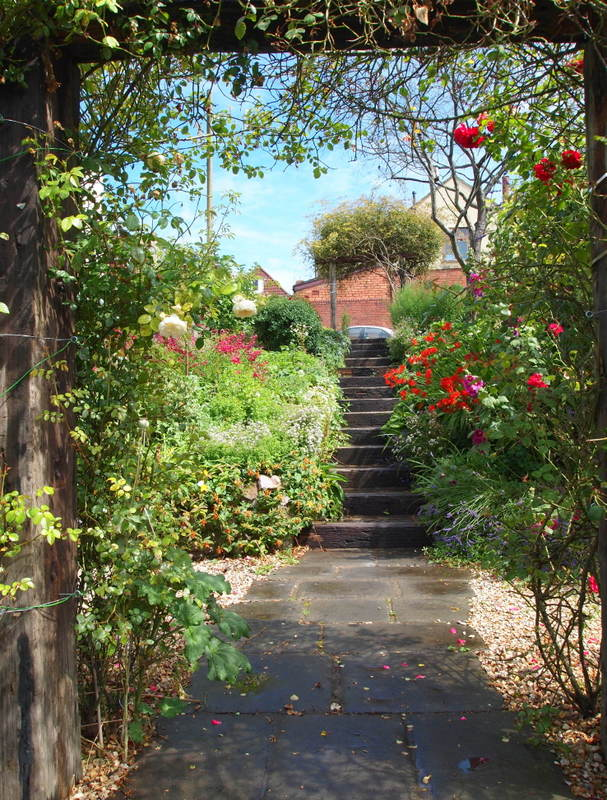
- Location of Quarry Steps, Durdham Down.
- Area of search: Avon
- Grid reference: ST573747
- Interest: Geological
- Area: 0.006 ha (0.015 acres)
- Notification date: 1990
- Location map: English Nature

Quarry Steps, Durdham Down (grid reference ST573747) is a 0.006 hectare geological Site of Special Scientific Interest near Durdham Down in Bristol, notified in 1990.

It was in this area that the first Thecodontosaurus fossil was discovered in 1834.

== Sources ==
- English Nature citation sheet for the site (accessed 13 July 2006)
