= Huish Colliery Quarry =

Geological Site of Special Scientific Interest in Somerset, England

- Site of Special Scientific Interest
- Location within Somerset
- Location of Huish Colliery Quarry.
- Area of search: Avon
- Grid reference: ST695542
- Coordinates: 51.28611°N 2.43873°W
- Interest: Geological
- Area: 0.8 hectares (0.0080 km^{2}; 0.0031 sq mi)
- Notification date: 1985

Huish Colliery Quarry (grid reference ST695542) is a 0.8 hectare geological Site of Special Scientific Interest near the town of Radstock, Bath and North East Somerset, notified in 1985.

This site includes rocks from the Lower Jurassic period many of which were removed by erosion leading to discontinuations in the Lias. The whole of the Sinemurian Stage and virtually all of the Hettangian Stage is absent. Also notable is the fact that the Jamesoni Zone limestones, which occur here, are much thicker and better developed than at any other comparable sites in the Mendip Hills.
