= Hampton Rocks Cutting =

Geological site in Somerset, England

- Site of Special Scientific Interest
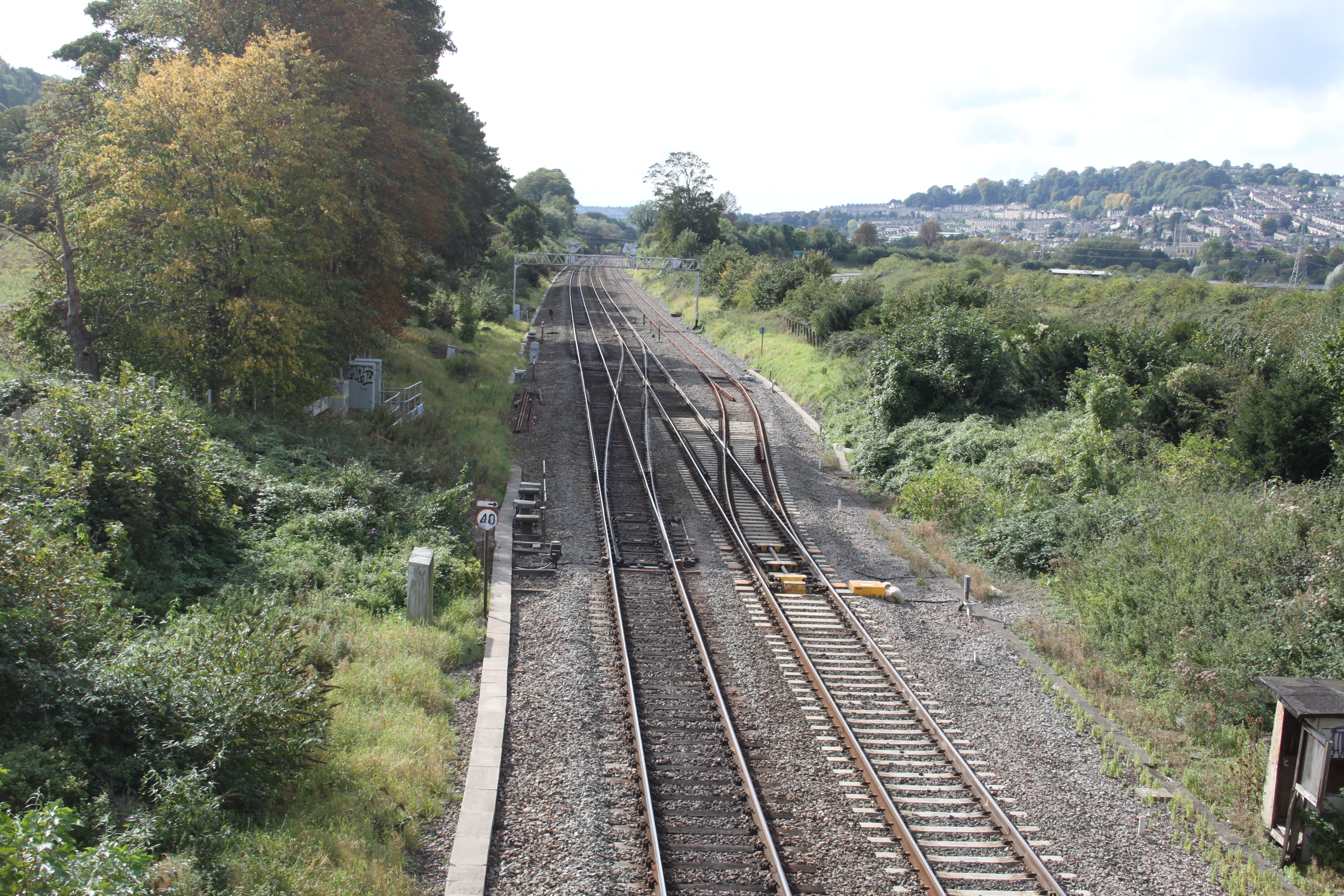

- Location within Somerset
- Location of Hampton Rocks Cutting.
- Area of search: Avon
- Grid reference: ST779666
- Coordinates: 51.39800°N 2.31906°W
- Interest: Geological
- Area: 1.3 hectares (0.013 km^{2}; 0.0050 sq mi)
- Notification date: 1990

Hampton Rocks Cutting (grid reference ST779666) is a 1.3 hectare geological Site of Special Scientific Interest near the village of Bathampton, Somerset, notified in 1990.

The site is listed in the Geological Conservation Review, for its exposure of Pleistocene rocks made up of coarse fluvial gravels showing scour-and-fill structures and planar bedding. Their sedimentology gives a clear indication that the deposits were laid down under 'cold-stage' conditions, probably during the Devensian glacial period.
