= Buckover Road Cutting =

Geological site in England

- Site of Special Scientific Interest
- Location within Gloucestershire
- Location of Buckover Road Cutting.
- Area of search: Avon
- Grid reference: ST665906
- Coordinates: 51.613215°N 2.483144°W
- Interest: Geological
- Area: 1.7 hectares (4.2 acres)
- Notification date: 1967

Buckover Road Cutting (grid reference ST665906) is a 1.7 hectare geological Site of Special Scientific Interest near the town of Thornbury, South Gloucestershire, notified in 1967.

The site shows an unconformity between Silurian rocks and quartz conglomerate of the Devonian period.
