= Winterbourne Railway Cutting =

Geological site in Gloucestershire, England

Coordinates: 51.51694°N 2.50436°W

- Site of Special Scientific Interest
- Location of Winterbourne Railway Cutting.
- Area of search: Avon
- Grid reference: ST651799
- Interest: Geological
- Area: 1.99 ha (4.9 acres)
- Notification date: 1990
- Location map: English Nature

Winterbourne Railway Cutting (grid reference ST651799) is a 1.99 hectare geological Site of Special Scientific Interest near the village of Winterbourne, South Gloucestershire, notified in 1990.

== Sources ==
- "English Nature citation sheet for the site" (PDF). Archived (PDF) from the original on 13 October 2006.
