= Congrove Field and The Tumps =

Protected area in Bath and North East Somerset, England

- Site of Special Scientific Interest
- Location within Somerset
- Location of Congrove Field and The Tumps.
- Area of search: Avon
- Grid reference: ST713698
- Coordinates: 51.42647°N 2.41418°W
- Interest: Biological
- Area: 30.8 acres (0.125 km^{2}; 0.0481 sq mi)
- Notification date: 1991

Congrove Field and The Tumps is a (grid reference ST713698) is a 14.2 hectares (35 acres) biological Site of Special Scientific Interest (SSSI) on Lansdown Hill, north of Bath in Bath and North East Somerset, notified in 1991.

It is an area of calcareous grassland lying over Oolitic (Jurassic) Limestone covered by shallow, well-drained soils. The Tumps is above Congrove Field, and is believed to be the site of mining activities in the past. The grassland communities present are of the Tor-grass (Brachypodium pinnatum) type showing elements of both the Meadow Oat-grass-wild thyme (Avenula pratensis)–(Thymus praecox) and the Knapweed-Rough Hawkbit (Centaurea nigra)–(Leontodon hispidus) variants.

The Tumps is also the name of an elevated area of woodland and open grassland in the southern outskirts of Bath, north of the Odd Down Sports Ground.
