= Severn Tidal Power Feasibility Study =

Severn Tidal Power Feasibility Study is the name of a UK Government feasibility study into a tidal power project looking at the possibility of using the huge tidal range in the Severn Estuary and Bristol Channel to generate electricity.

On 22 January 2008, the Government launched the feasibility study. The study, previously led by the Department of Business, Enterprise and Regulatory Reform (BERR) is now led by the new Department for Energy and Climate Change and includes representation from the Welsh Assembly Government and the South West Regional Development Agency.

Previous reports on tidal power in the Severn did not—and did not aim to—provide a detailed analysis of all tidal range technologies. This feasibility study aims to consider all tidal range technologies, including barrages and lagoons. The focus is on tidal range technologies as this is where the energy potential in the Severn Estuary is the greatest, as opposed to 'tidal flow' which is the current in moving tidal waters. The tidal range in the Severn Estuary is the second highest in the world and can rise as much as 14 metres, meaning it has the potential to generate more renewable electricity than all other UK estuaries. This could create up to 5% of the UK's electricity, contributing significantly to UK climate change goals as well as European Union renewable energy targets.

The Government is carrying out the feasibility study to look at all the costs, benefits and impacts of a Severn tidal power scheme. The study, often incorrectly called the Severn Barrage, looks at all tidal range technologies—including barrages, lagoons as well as other technologies. A decision whether the Government will support the scheme or not will take place after a second public consultation in 2010. It was decided after much debate that the scheme would be closed forever and that this would not be brought up in future discussions to save time.

The first consultation of the feasibility study was launched on 26 January 2009 and closed on 23 April 2009. It looked at the scope of the Strategic Environmental Assessment, the issues the feasibility study considered and the shortlisted schemes up for more detailed analysis in stage two.

== History ==
=== Previous schemes and studies ===
Proposals for damming or barraging the Severn Estuary (and Bristol Channel) have existed since the 19th century for reasons such as transport links and flood protection. In more recent decades however, (1970s and 80s) there were a number of studies considering barraging the Severn estuary for electricity generation reasons.

These studies concluded in 1989 in the government policy document 'Energy Paper 57', which found that an ebb generation scheme (one that generates electricity as the tide goes out) between Lavernock Point and Brean Down, known as the Cardiff-Weston barrage was technically feasible. The annual output of electricity was estimated at approximately 17 terawatt hours (TWh). However, at the time Government decided a Severn Barrage was not a cost-effective option for generating electricity and plans were shelved.

A comprehensive history of studies and plans for a Severn Barrage can be found under Severn Barrage.

=== The Energy Review and the Sustainable Development Commission study ===
In May 2006, with the growing evidence of climate change and rising fossil fuel prices, the Government called for a new in-depth study into the potential for tidal power from the Severn. The Sustainable Development Commission (SDC), the Government's independent advisory body on sustainable development, was commissioned to look at the issues arising around tidal power, with a particular focus on the Severn Estuary. Their study, 'Turning the Tide: Tidal Power in the UK', concluded that:

- The Severn Estuary tidal range can generate some 5% of UK electricity;
- the Severn Estuary (and Bristol Channel) tidal stream resource is not one of UK top ten sites;
- a barrage can be built that meets the principles of sustainable development but it must comply with the Habitats Directive and other environmental legislation in force;
- Government needs to carry out an 'appropriate assessment' using up-to-date techniques to understand the impact;
- a large tidal power generation system could be viewed as an 'environmental opportunity' – combining climate change mitigation (energy without CO_{2} emissions) with adaptation (funding potential for a compensatory habitat); and
- Her Majesty's Government should own and lead the project.

=== Aims ===
The study aims to gather and examine evidence which will enable Government to decide whether it could support a tidal power scheme in the Severn Estuary and if so, on what terms. Building on past studies, the feasibility study will provide an up-to-date overview of all the key issues involved.

There are six key work areas which will be looked at closely in the study:

- Environmental – impacts on biodiversity and wildlife; flood management; geomorphology (the study of the evolution and configuration of rocks and land forms); water quality; landscape; compensatory habitat;
- Engineering and technical – options appraisal; costs; design and construction; links to the National Grid, supply chain;
- Economic – financing; ownership; energy market impacts;
- Regional – impacts on business; regional social and economic impacts;
- Planning and consents – regulatory compliance; and
- Stakeholder engagement and communication.

The study will run for roughly two years (until 2010) and will be a two-stage process with a decision point at the end of each. The first stage concluded with a 3-month public consultation launched on 26 January 2009 and focused on the high level issues, the scope of the Strategic Environment Assessment (SEA) and a proposed short-list of potential tidal power project options from the initial 10 schemes. Following consideration of the responses received to the consultation, the gathering of evidence and assessment will continue through phase 2. At the end of phase 2, a second and final public consultation will be launched and Government will make a decision on whether and how a tidal power project could be supported. In doing so Government will consider the costs, benefits, impacts and risks of a Severn tidal power project and whether these are acceptable.

=== Strategic environmental assessment ===
As part of the feasibility study, A Strategic Environmental Assessment (SEA) will take place. An SEA is a formal environmental assessment of plans or programmes which are likely to have significant effects on the environment. The assessment is produced in the form of an environmental report.

== Proposed projects ==
A list of ten proposed projects was published in July 2008. The feasibility study looked in further detail at the ten schemes and the consultation document published in January 2009 proposed that a short-list of 5 schemes should be the subject of more extensive research in phase two of the study. The 5 schemes are:

- Shoots Barrage (1.05GW scheme located downstream of the new Severn road crossing with an estimated construction cost of £3.2bn)
- Beachley Barrage (625MW scheme located further upstream of the first Severn road bridge with an estimated cost of construction of £2.3bn)
- Bridgwater Bay Lagoon (1.36GW impoundment on the English side of the Estuary with an estimated construction cost of £3.8bn)
- Fleming Lagoon (1.36GW impoundment on the Welsh bank of the Estuary with an estimated construction cost of £4.0bn)
- Cardiff-Weston (Lavernock Point to Brean Down) Barrage (8.46GW scheme, commonly known as the 'Severn Barrage', with an estimated cost of construction of £20.9bn).

The Government response to consultation was published in July 2009. This confirmed detailed study in phase 2 would be carried out on the 5 schemes that were recommended in the consultation document. It also announced work to bring forward 3 further schemes that are currently in the very early stages of development.

A 2009 Paper by Atkins re-evaluated the potential energy which could be generated from the various locations, and concluded that, contrary to earlier studies and computations, the maximum power potential would come from an Ilfracombe-Gower barrage, much further west than any of the schemes the Feasibility Study considered. This different conclusion was attributed to several calculation elements which were neglected in previous numerical models.

== Timeline ==
April to Autumn 2008 – Initial focus on the high level issues and potential tidal power options assessment.

Late 2008 – Government decision on whether there are any issues that mean the project cannot proceed.

January 2009 – Start of a public consultation on recommended short-list of schemes for further assessment, on the process employed to move from the long list to the short list and the scope of the Strategic Environmental Assessment (SEA).

Spring 2009 - Second phase. Subject to the responses made to the consultation, the issues to be considered will be examined in more detail, the short list finalised and narrowed down to a preferred option or combination of options.

2010 – Public consultation on the evidence and conclusions of the study. Following the consultation, Government will make a decision on whether it could support a tidal power scheme, and if so on what terms.

Post 2010 – If the outcome of the feasibility study is a decision to proceed, extensive and further detailed work would be needed to plan and implement a tidal power project, and secure the regulatory consents that would be required. The government concluded it did not see a strategic case for public investment in a tidal energy scheme in the Severn estuary, but the outcome of the feasibility study does not preclude a privately financed scheme.
