= Holly Lane SSSI =

Protected area in Somerset, England

Holly Lane
- Site of Special Scientific Interest
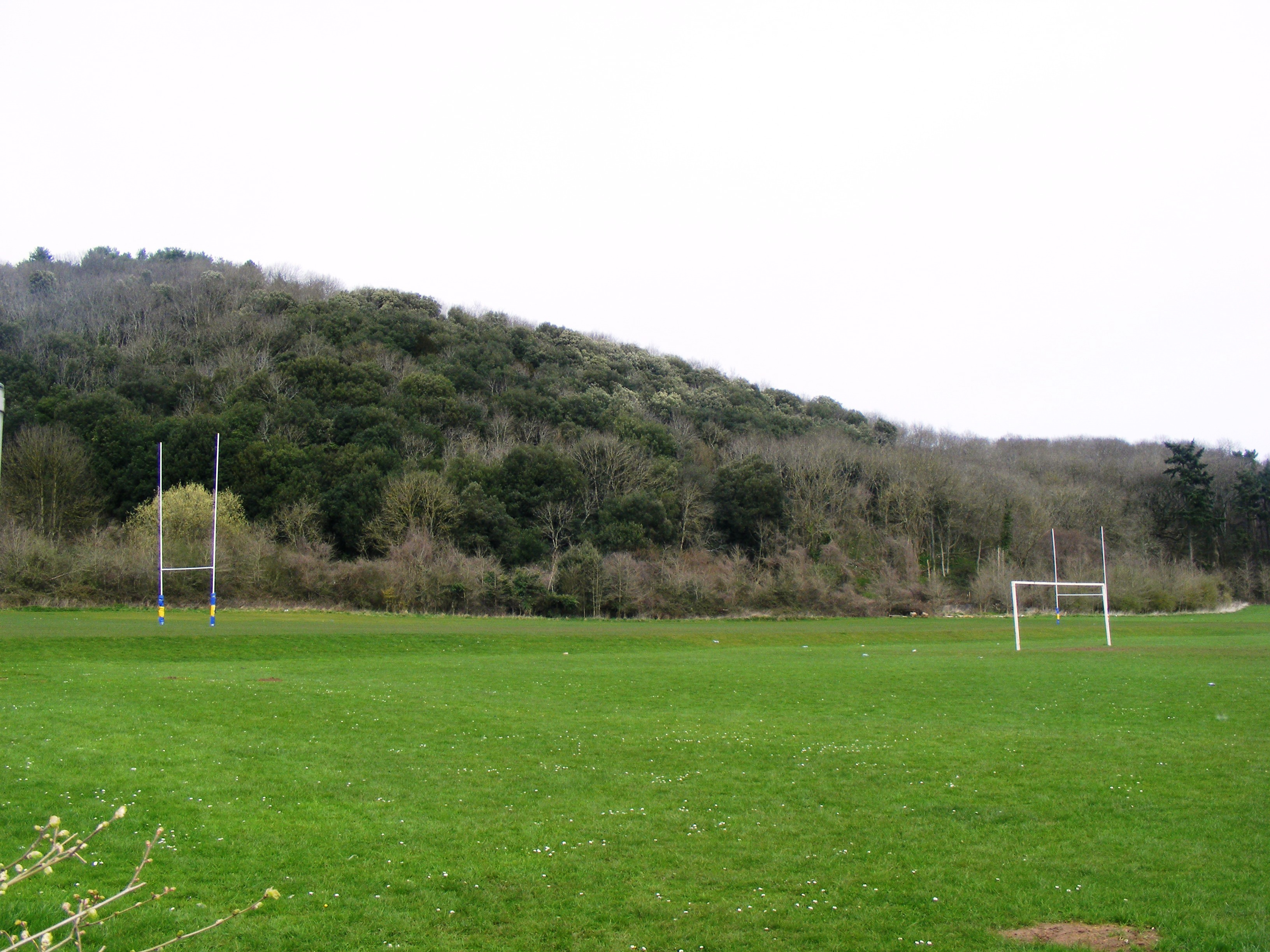

- Location within Somerset
- Location of Holly Lane.
- Area of search: Avon
- Grid reference: ST419727
- Coordinates: 51.45029°N 2.83749°W
- Interest: Geological
- Area: 0.5 hectares (0.0050 km^{2}; 0.0019 sq mi)
- Notification date: 1990

Holly Lane SSSI (grid reference ST419727) is a 0.5 hectare geological Site of Special Scientific Interest near the village of Walton St. Mary, North Somerset, notified in 1990.

This Geological Conservation Review site shows deep subaerial sands and breccias burying a fossil cliff, shoreplatform, wave-cut notch and cave. The sands are of Pleistocene age and thought to be aeolian (windblown) coversands. They contain recycled foraminifera (eroded from older rocks) and open-ground terrestrial mollusca. Fossils of mammalian fauna include horse, bear, wolf, fox and several rodent species.
