= Spring Cove Cliffs =

- Site of Special Scientific Interest
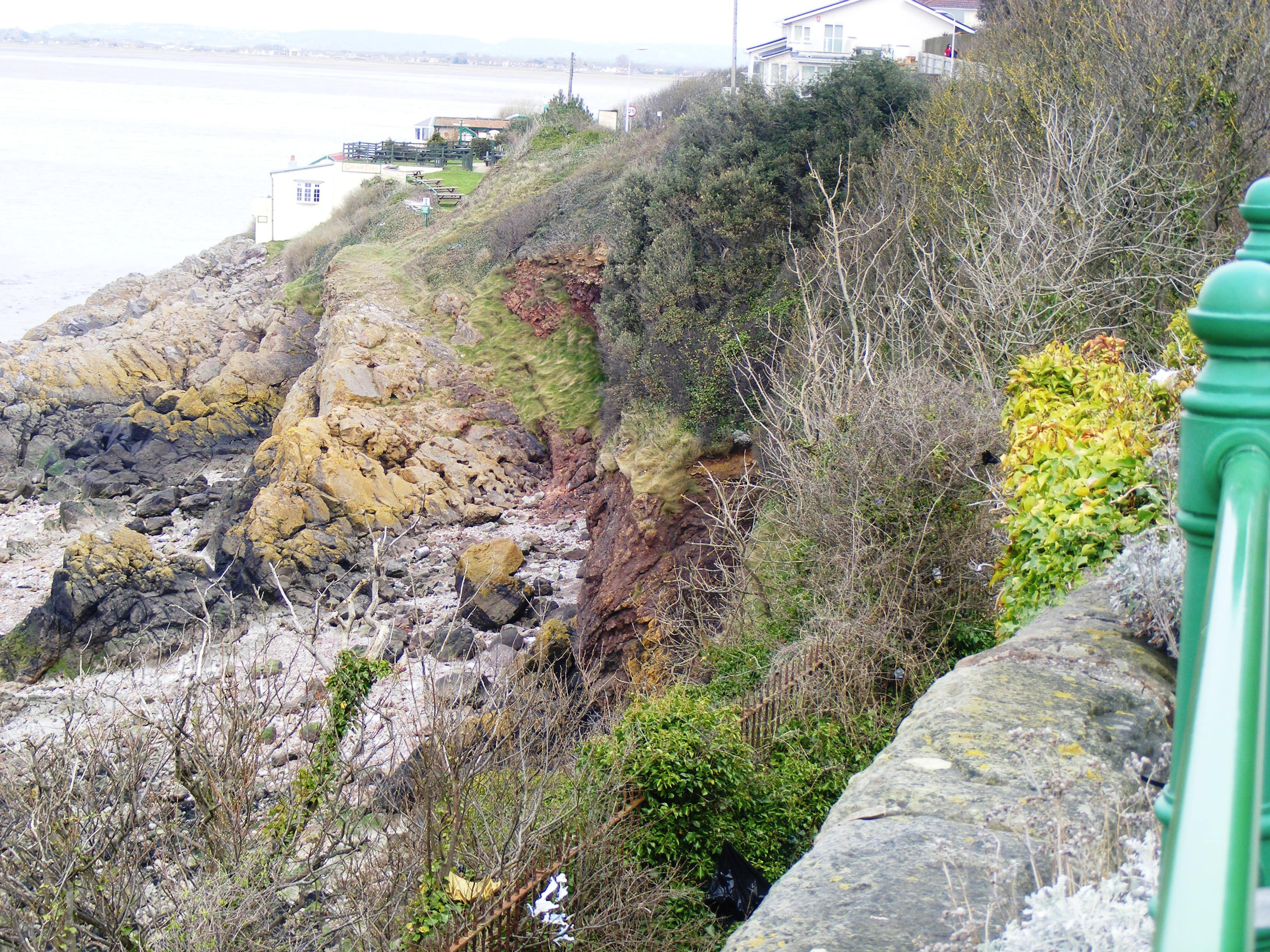

- Location within Somerset
- Location of Spring Cove Cliffs.
- Area of search: Avon
- Grid reference: ST310625
- Coordinates: 51.35736°N 2.99233°W
- Interest: Geological
- Area: 2.0 hectares (0.020 km^{2}; 0.0077 sq mi)
- Notification date: 1952

Spring Cove Cliffs (grid reference ST310625) is a 2.0 hectare geological Site of Special Scientific Interest near the town of Weston-super-Mare, North Somerset, notified in 1952.

The site is listed in the Geological Conservation Review, because of the stratigraphic and igneous features which are displayed. The sequence of Dinantian volcanic rocks, about 18 metres (59 ft) thick, lying to the south of the St George's Land landmass, and also because of the submarine character of the lavas and their intimate relationship with adjacent carbonate sediments. The lava, which is pillowed in places, is believed to have been extruded upon a sloping seafloor.
