= St. Catherine's Valley =

Valley in Gloucestershire, England

Coordinates: 51.45097°N 2.34677°W

- Site of Special Scientific Interest
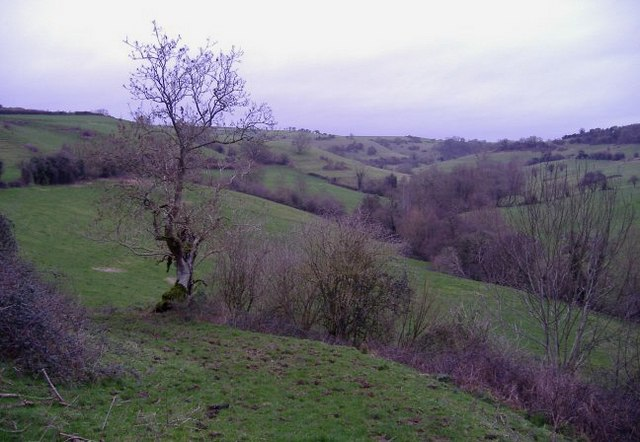
- Location of St. Catherine's Valley.
- Area of search: Avon
- Grid reference: ST760725
- Interest: Biological
- Area: 156.1 ha (386 acres)
- Notification date: 1997
- Location map: English Nature

St. Catherine's Valley (grid reference ST760725) is a 156.1 hectare biological Site of Special Scientific Interest southwest of the village of Marshfield, South Gloucestershire, notified in 1997.

At the Marshfield end of the valley, a large naturalised population of Dragon's Teeth (Tetragonolobus maritimus), a species not native to Britain, is present; it was first found by Rev. E. Ellman in 1927.

== Sources ==
- English Nature citation sheet for the site (accessed 16 July 2006)
