= Penarth Coast =

Protected area in Glamorgan, Wales

Coordinates: 51.417676°N 3.171186°W

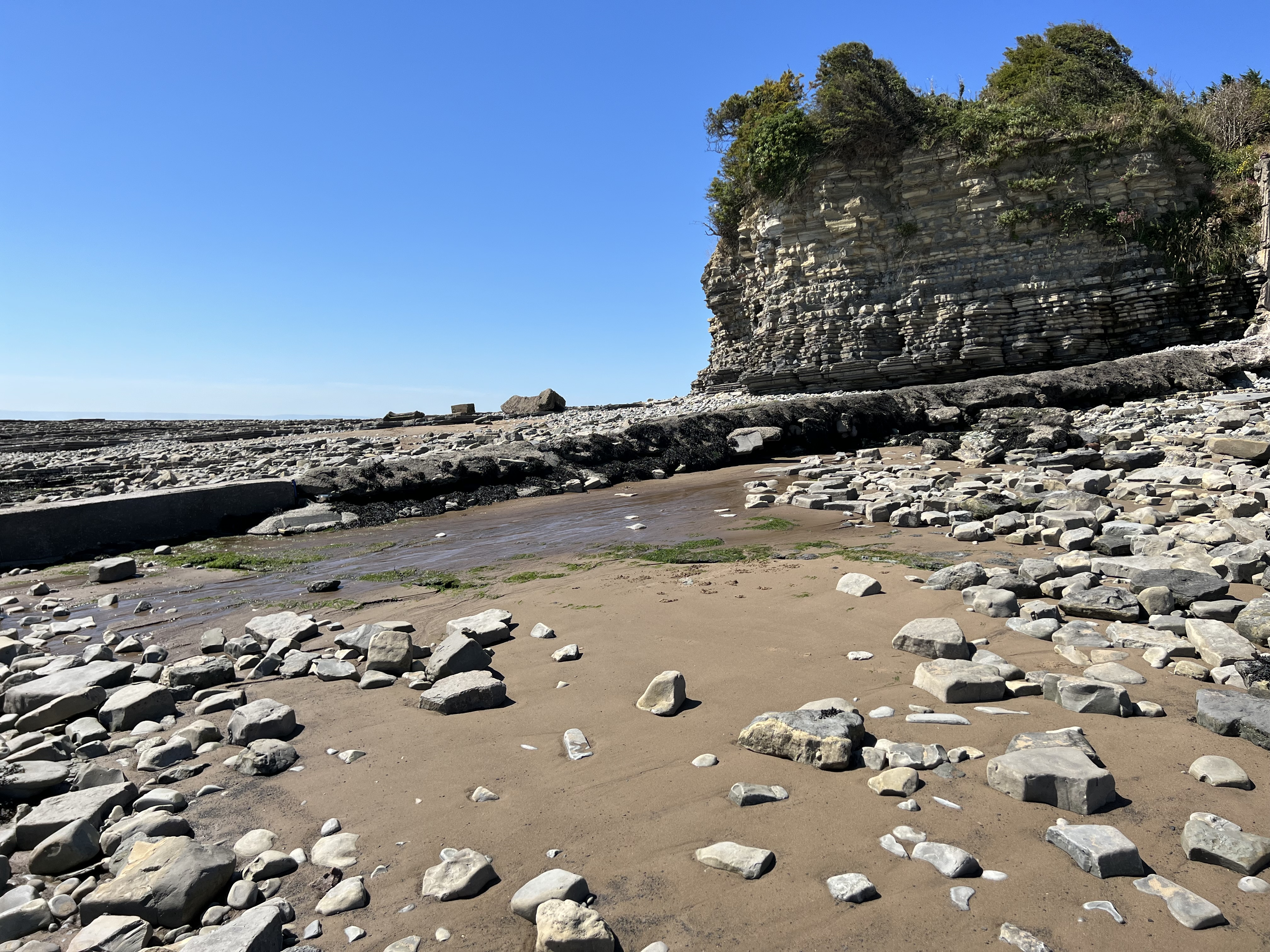
Vale of Glamorgan, Penarth Coast.

Penarth Coast is a Site of Special Scientific Interest in Penarth, Vale of Glamorgan, south Wales. The coastline contains dinosaur fossils.

== See also ==
- List of Sites of Special Scientific Interest in Mid & South Glamorgan
