= Portishead Pier to Black Nore SSSI =

Protected area in Somerset, England

Portishead Pier to Black Nore
- Site of Special Scientific Interest
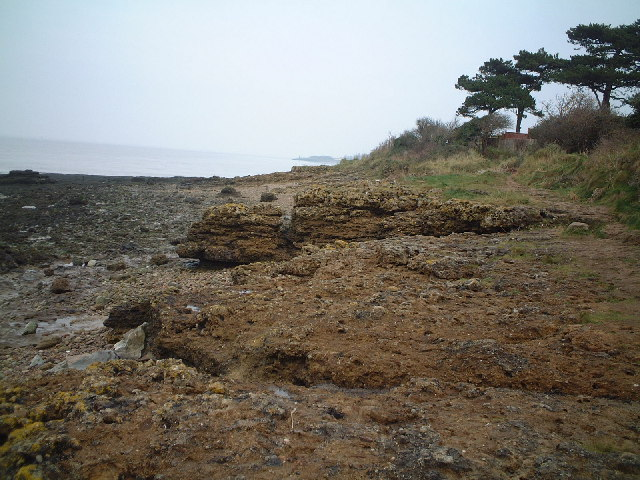

- Location within Somerset
- Location of Portishead Pier to Black Nore.
- Area of search: Avon
- Grid reference: ST474778
- Coordinates: 51.49668°N 2.75911°W
- Interest: Geological
- Area: 71.8 hectares (0.718 km^{2}; 0.277 sq mi)
- Notification date: 1952

Portishead Pier to Black Nore SSSI (grid reference ST474778) is a 71.8 hectare geological Site of Special Scientific Interest near the town of Portishead in North Somerset, notified in 1952.

The Portishead Pier Section is made up of alluvial sandstones which represents the best exposure of Upper Carboniferous rocks in the Avonmouth Coalfield. The cliff and foreshore exposures around Portishead Point provide important exposures of geological structures form during the Variscan mountain building episode (orogeny) in the Carboniferous Period of geological history. Also included are areas which show important exposures of the Devonian sequence and yields several species of fossil fishes. Holoptychius scales are the most abundant fossils, but teeth scales of other species are also relatively common. Notably amongst the collection from this bed are plates of arthrodires, including Groenlandaspis.
