= Denny Island =

Uninhabited island off the shores of Great Britain

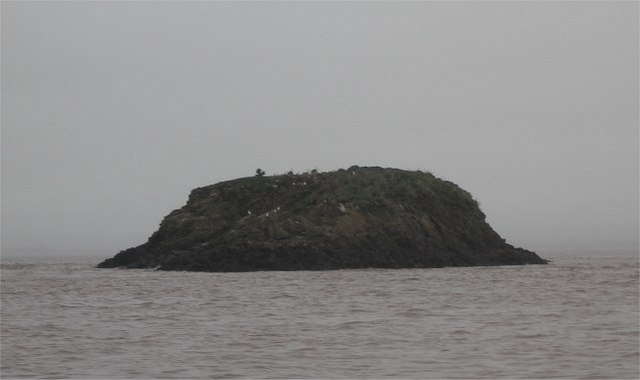
- Interactive map of Denny Island

Geography
- Location: Severn Estuary
- Coordinates: 51°31′33″N 2°46′51″W
- Area: 2,400 m^{2} (26,000 sq ft)

Administration
- Wales
- County Council: Monmouthshire

Demographics
- Population: 0

Denny Island (Welsh: Ynys Denny; grid reference ST459810) is a small uninhabited rocky island of 0.24 hectares (0.6 acres), with scrub vegetation, in the Severn Estuary. Its rocky southern foreshore marks the boundary between England and Wales. Above high water mark, the island is reckoned administratively to Monmouthshire, South Wales. The island also marks the north-western limit of the City of Bristol's water boundary in the Severn estuary.

It is located approximately three miles north of Portishead, midway between Redwick in Wales and Avonmouth in England. It is surrounded by sandbanks known as the Welsh Grounds. Its foreshore area changes dramatically according to the state of the tide, because tides in the estuary and Bristol Channel are amongst the highest in the world, reaching 13.7 m (45 ft) at the spring equinox. It is known as a nesting-place for gulls, cormorants and other seabirds, which are regularly seen and ringed there.

== History ==
Denny Island appears in the historical record for the first time as Dunye, in the charter recording the creation of the county of Bristol in 1373. This suggests that the name means, in Old English, 'island shaped like a down (i.e. a hill with a rounded profile)'. It gives its name to the Denny Island Fault Zone, a part of the Avon-Solent Fracture zone.

On 21 September 1995, Neil Carter from Portishead spent 3 nights on Denny Island to raise money for the RNLI. 23 years later, on 21 September 2018, he slept overnight on the island to raise money for the maintenance of the Black Nore Lighthouse by the Black Nore Lighthouse Trust.

In 2004, the island was subject to an unsuccessful appeal under Section 6(1) of the Countryside and Rights of Way Act 2000 against it appearing on a map of registered common land.

On 13 November 2017, Lave net fishermen from Wales claimed to have discovered a large amount of plastic, some of which was used as nesting material by seabirds, a bomb from WW2, and several cannon balls after visiting Denny Island.

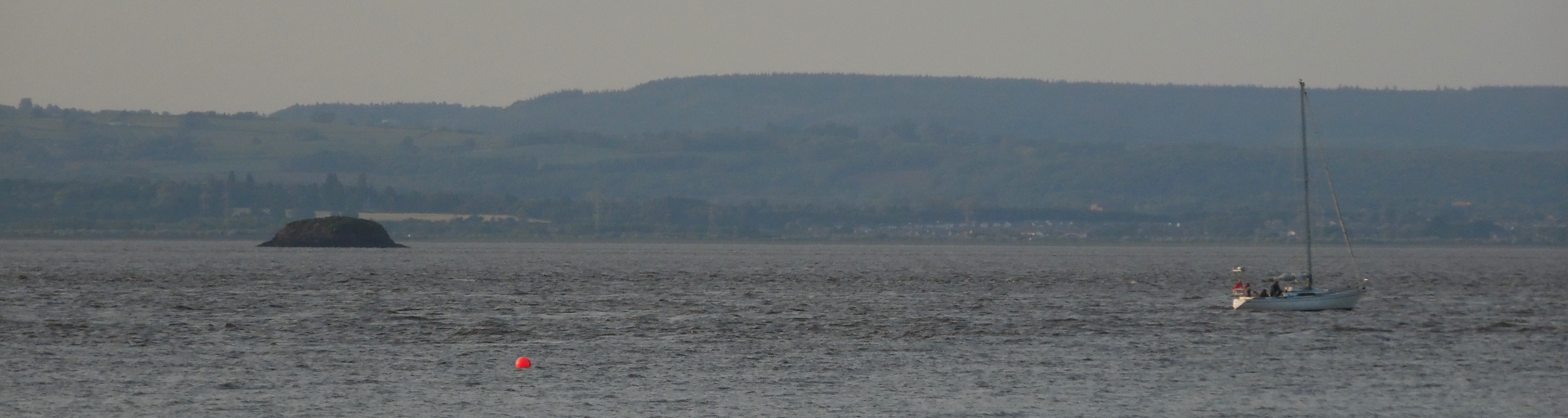
Denny Island and a sailboat as seen from the North Somerset coast
