= North Weston =

North Weston may refer to:

- North Weston, Oxfordshire, a hamlet in Great Haseley, Oxfordshire, England
- North Weston, Somerset, a village and former civil parish in Somerset, England
