= Portishead Point Lighthouse =

Lighthouse in Somerset, England

Portishead Point Lighthouse Battery Point
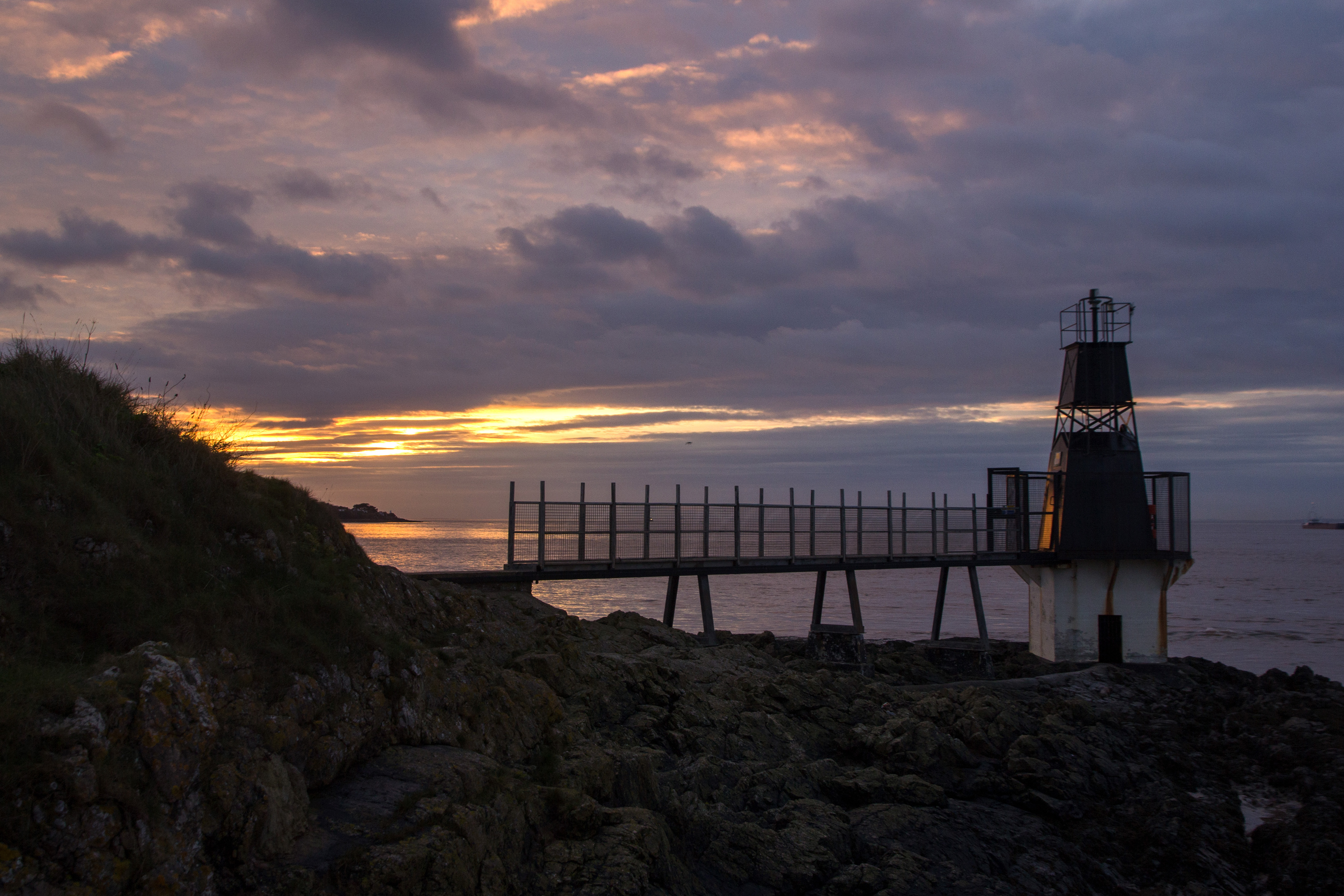
- Portishead Point Lighthouse also known as Battery Point Lighthouse
- Location: Portishead; Somerset; England
- Coordinates: 51.494626°N 2.773586°W

Tower
- Constructed: 1931
- Foundation: concrete base
- Construction: metal skeletal tower
- Height: 9 metres (30 ft)
- Shape: square pyramidal tower enclosed with balcony and light
- Markings: black tower, white basement
- Operator: Bristol Port Company

Light
- Focal height: 9 metres (30 ft)
- Lens: 4th-order dioptric
- Range: 16 nautical miles (30 km; 18 mi)
- Characteristic: Q (3) W 10s.

Portishead Point Lighthouse, more commonly known as Battery Point Lighthouse, was built in Portishead, Somerset, England, in 1931.

== History ==
The 9-metre-high (30 ft) lighthouse was built as an unwatched automatic light by the Chance Brothers of Smethwick at Battery Point in 1931. It consists of a black metal pyramid on a concrete base.

Initially, it had been intended to provide Portishead Point with a diaphone fog signal. However, in response to local unrest at the prospect, the decision was taken to commission a fog bell instead. Gillett & Johnston of Croydon cast the two-tonne bell was cast by in 1938 and installed it the following year. Due to structural concerns, the bell was removed in 1998; later, following public campaigning for restoration, the bell was acquired by Portishead Town Council and returned to the town in 2012. It is installed on Wyndham Way, close to the High Street.

The lighthouse is maintained by the Bristol Port Company. The light was refurbished in 2012.

== Gallery ==
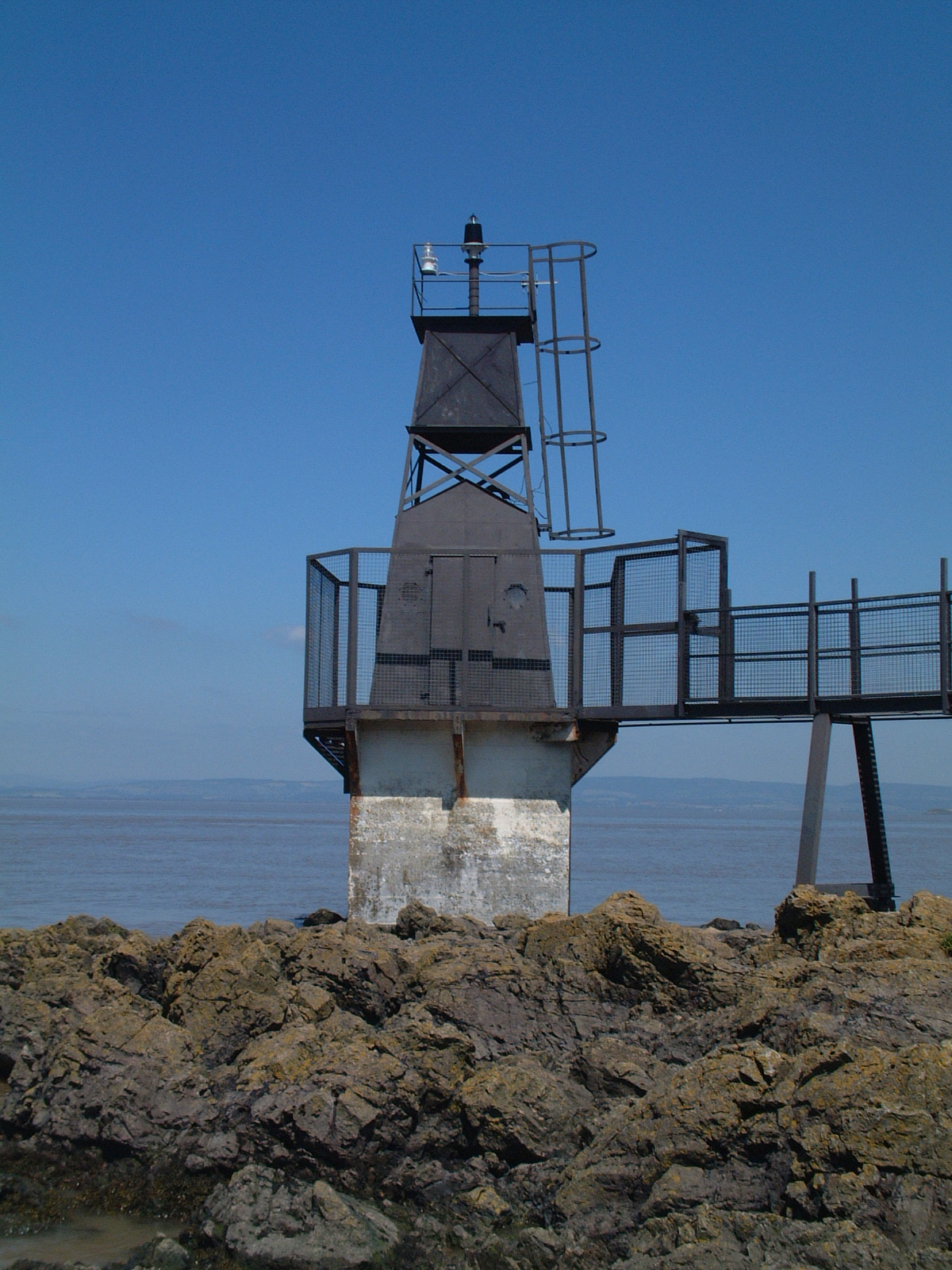
Close-up of the lighthouse.

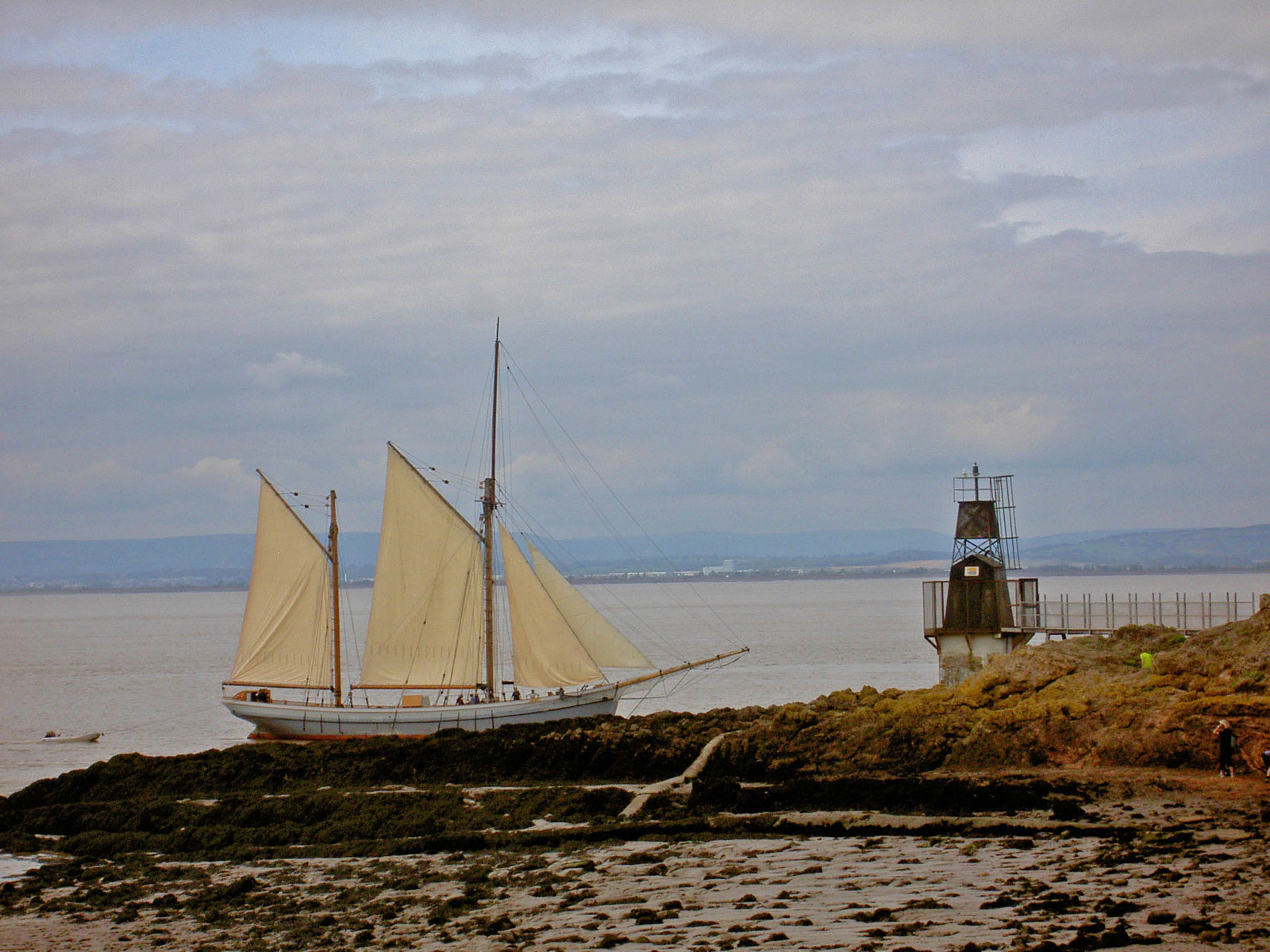
Irene sailing past Portishead Point.

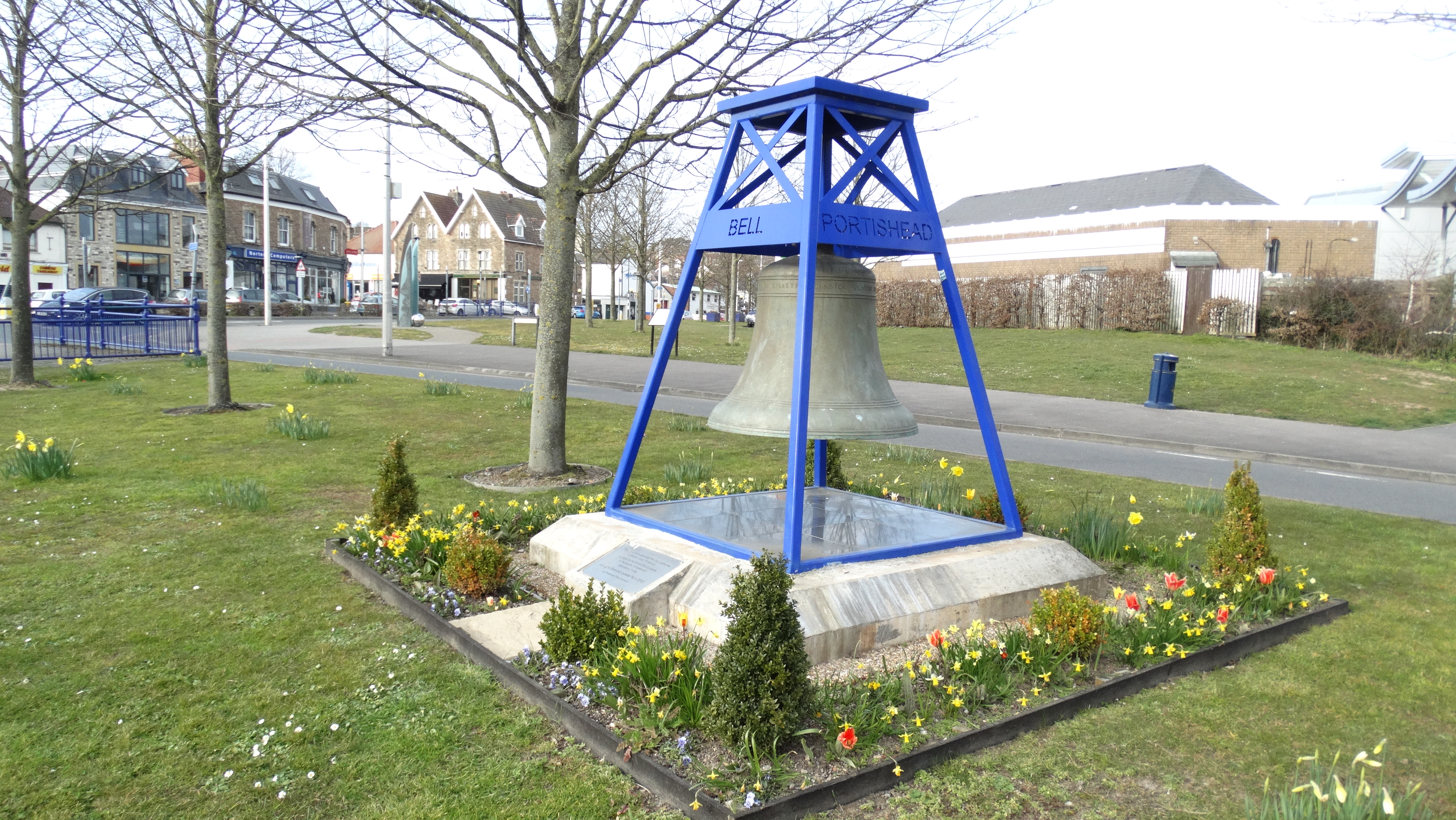
The bell, displayed on Wyndham Way.

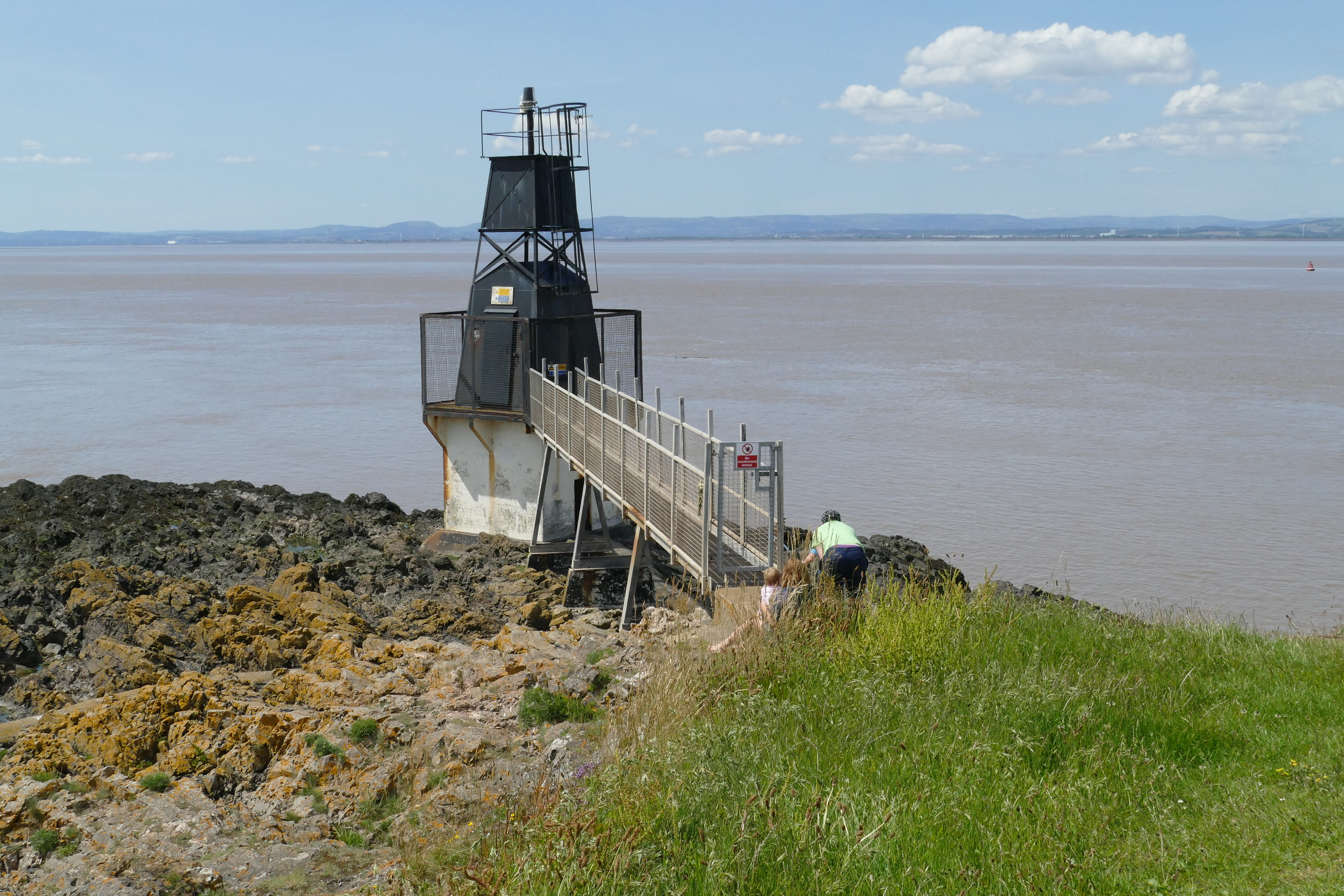
The lighthouse

== See also ==
- List of lighthouses in England
