= Portishead Times =

Local newspaper in Somerset, England

- Type: Weekly newspaper
- Format: Tabloid
- Website: http://www.thewestonmercury.co.uk

The Portishead Times is a weekly free newspaper delivered to homes in the Portishead and surrounding villages area of North Somerset, England. It can also be bought in local news agents.
