= Elizabeth Rebecca Ward =

English writer (1880–1978)

Fay Inchfawn (Elizabeth Rebecca Ward)

Elizabeth Rebecca Ward (2 December 1880 – 16 April 1978) was a prolific English writer of popular verse, religious works, and works for children, writing under the pen-name Fay Inchfawn. Her works were serialised in women's magazines, and she was sometimes known as "The Poet Laureate of the Home".

== Early life and family ==
Elizabeth Rebecca Ward was born Elizabeth Rebecca Daniels at Portishead, Somerset, on 2 December 1880. She married Atkinson Ward (1882 – October 1965) in 1911 in the Long Ashton district of Somerset. They moved to Bradford-on-Avon in Wiltshire and in 1913 had a daughter, Mary Arundell Ward (died 1983), who was known as "Bunty" in Ward's books. In 1927, the family moved to Innisfree, a Victorian villa at Freshford, Somerset, where she lived for the rest of her life.

== Career ==
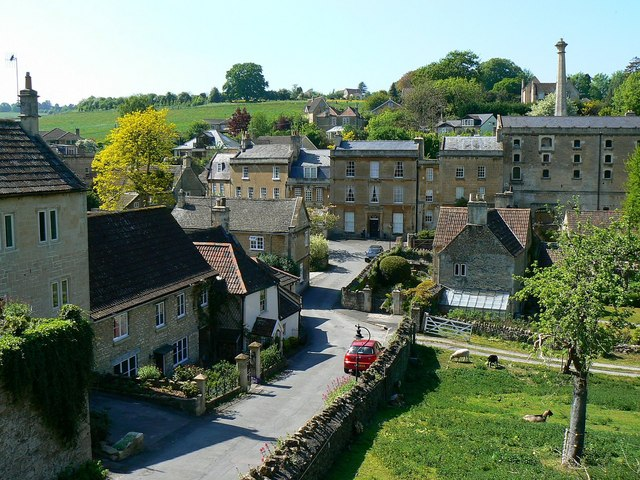
Freshford, Somerset

Writing as Fay Inchfawn, Ward was a prolific author of books of popular verse during the years between the two World Wars. Her works were serialised in women's magazines and she was sometimes known as "The Poet Laureate of the Home". She also wrote books for children, some with her husband who used the pseudonym Philip Inchfawn, and numerous religious works.

Her Salute to the village (Lutterworth, 1943) was a first-hand account of the effects of the Second World War on a middle-class provincial family, with locations and people disguised using pseudonyms. Although not identified in the book, the village is presumed to be Freshford. The book describes the influx of refugees from the bombing of nearby Bath in 1942 during the "Baedeker raids", economic and resources shortages, the blackout, fire-watching, and the building of pill-boxes and barricades in the fields so that enemy gliders could not land. It was illustrated with line drawings by Alfred Bestall who also drew Rupert Bear for The Daily Express. The book was republished in 2010 by Folly Books with a new biographical introduction by Nick McCamley.

Her memoirs were published by Lutterworth Press in 1963 as Those remembered days: A personal recording. This was followed by Something more to say: A personal recording in 1965 and Not the final word: Or, a joyful tribute in 1969.

== Death ==
Elixabeth Ward died on 16 April 1978 at the age of 97 and is buried at St Mary's church, Limpley Stoke. A celebration of her life was held at St Mary's on what would have been her 100th birthday, which was written up for This England magazine.

== Selected publications ==
- A book of remembrance. Ward Lock, London, c. 1930.
- As I lay thinking
- ‘’ Barrow Down Folk’’ Lutterworth Press 1948
- Father Neptune's treasure: The adventures of three children and a golliwog under the sea. S. W. Partridge & Co., London, 1919. (With Philip Inchfawn, pseud. Atkinson Ward)
- Having it out: Talks and readings for women's meetings
- Homely talks of a homely woman
- Homely verses of a home-lover
- Little donkey
- Living in a village
- Not the final word: Or, a joyful tribute. Lutterworth Press, 1969. ISBN 0718816404
- Picnic on the hill
- Poems from a quiet room
- Salute to the village. Lutterworth, 1943. (Illustrated by Alfred Bestall) (Republished by Folly Books, 2010)
- Senior reciter
- Something more to say: A personal recording. Lutterworth Press, 1965
- Songs of the ups; downs
- Sweet water and bitter
- The adventures of a homely woman
- The beautiful presence in the garden of the soul
- The day's journey
- The Golliwog news: A story of three children and a toy newspaper. S.W. Partridge & Co., London, 1913. (Illustrated by T.C. Smith) (With Philip Inchfawn, pseud. Atkinson Ward)
- The journal of a tent-dweller. Religious Tract Society, 1931
- The life book of Mary Watt. Ward Lock, London, 1935
- The little donkey
- The verse book of a homely woman, 1920. Republished by Standard Publications, 2009.
- Think of the lilies (Lakeland)
- Those remembered days: A personal recording. Lutterworth Press, 1963
- Through the windows of a little house (Republished by FB&C, 2017)
- Unposted letters
- Verses of a house-mother
- Who goes over the sea
- Who goes to the garden
- Who goes to the wood
- Will you come as well? Ward Lock, London, c. 1931. (Illustrated by Treyer Evans)
