= North Weston, Somerset =

Village in Somerset, England

Coordinates: 51.4704°N 2.7726°W

North Weston
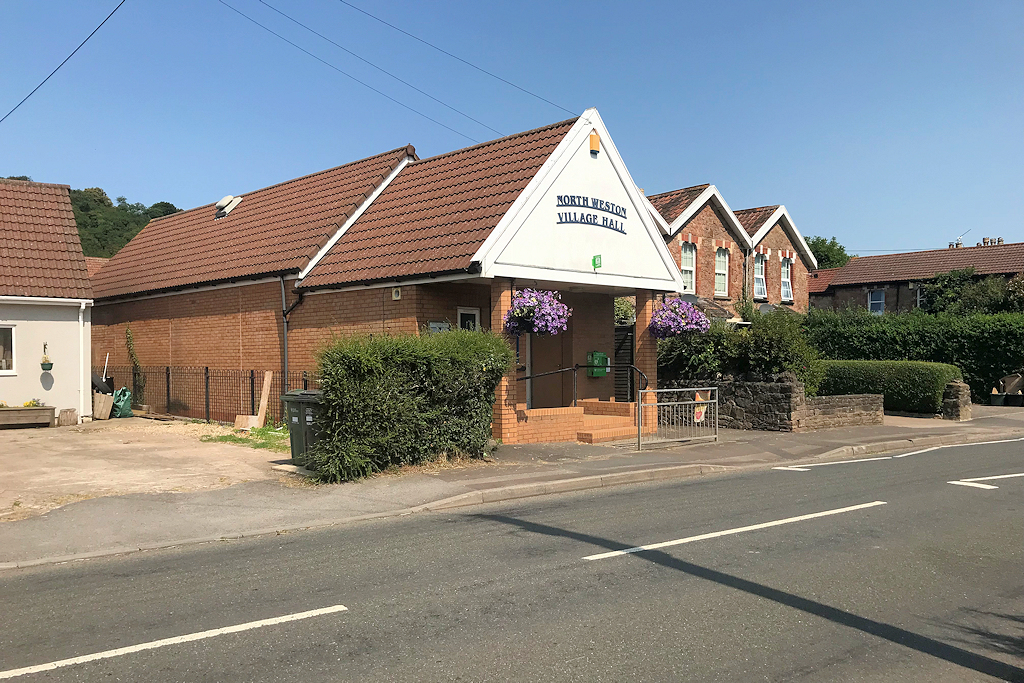
- North Weston village hall

- Location within Somerset
- OS grid reference: ST4524975973
- Civil parish: Portishead
- Unitary authority: North Somerset
- Ceremonial county: Somerset
- Region: South West
- Country: England
- Sovereign state: United Kingdom
- Post town: BRISTOL
- Postcode district: BS20
- Police: Avon and Somerset
- Fire: Avon
- Ambulance: South Western
- UK Parliament: North Somerset

North Weston is a village in the civil parish of Portishead, in the North Somerset district of Somerset, England. It lies between Portishead and Weston-in-Gordano, within the parish of Portishead. In the 2001 census the North Weston ward (which includes the Redcliffe Bay area of Portishead) had a population of 3,890.

At the north end of the village is Gordano School. To the west of the village lies Weston Big Wood.

North Weston was historically a hamlet in the parish of Portishead. It was created a separate civil parish on 31 December 1894. On 1 April 1993 the parish was reunited with Portishead. The name of the parish was then "Portishead and North Weston" from 1993 to 2011 when the name was changed to just Portishead. In 1971 the parish had a population of 2469.
