= Portishead, Somerset =

Town in Somerset, England

Coordinates: 51.4840°N 2.7626°W

Portishead
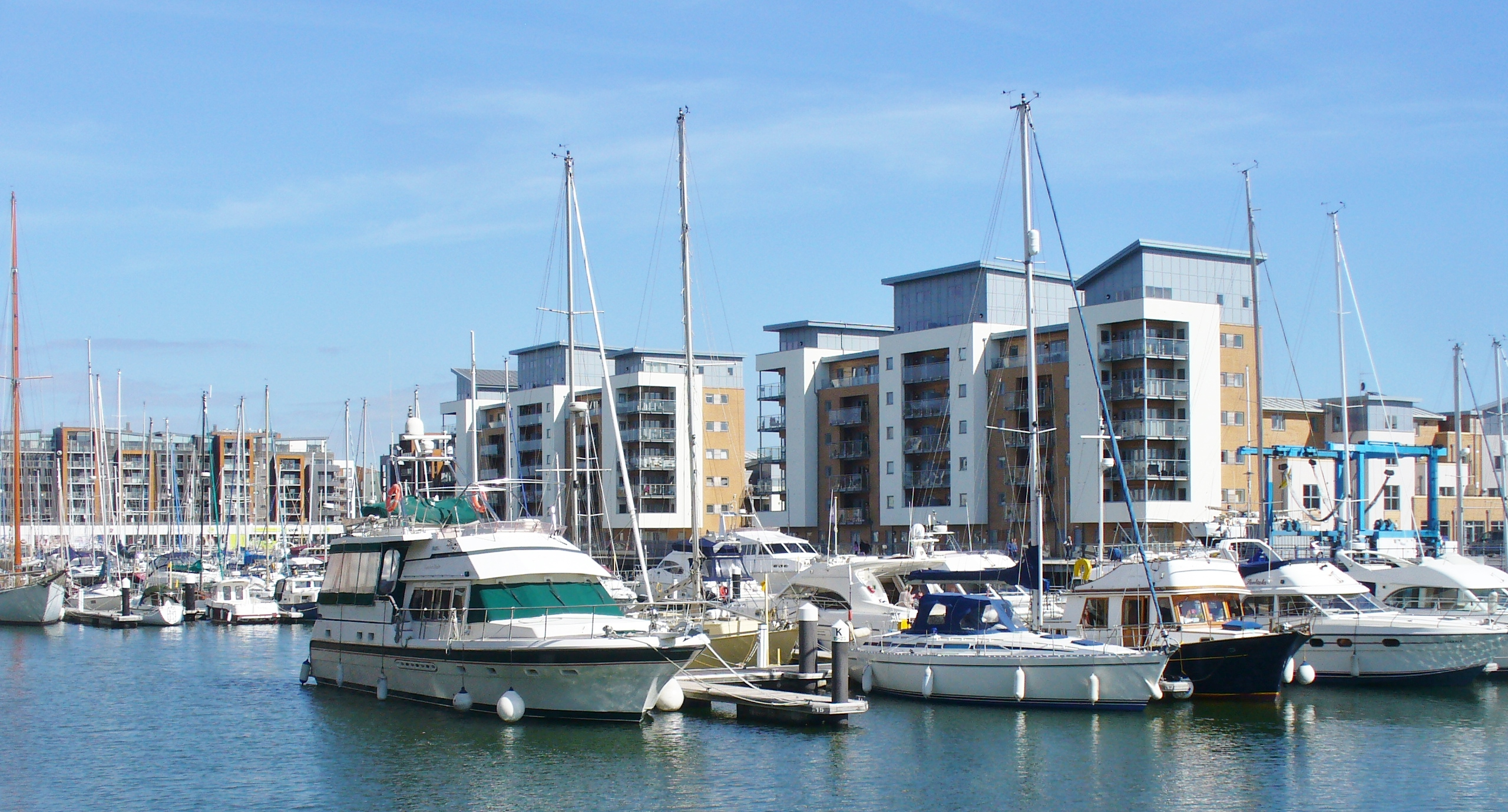
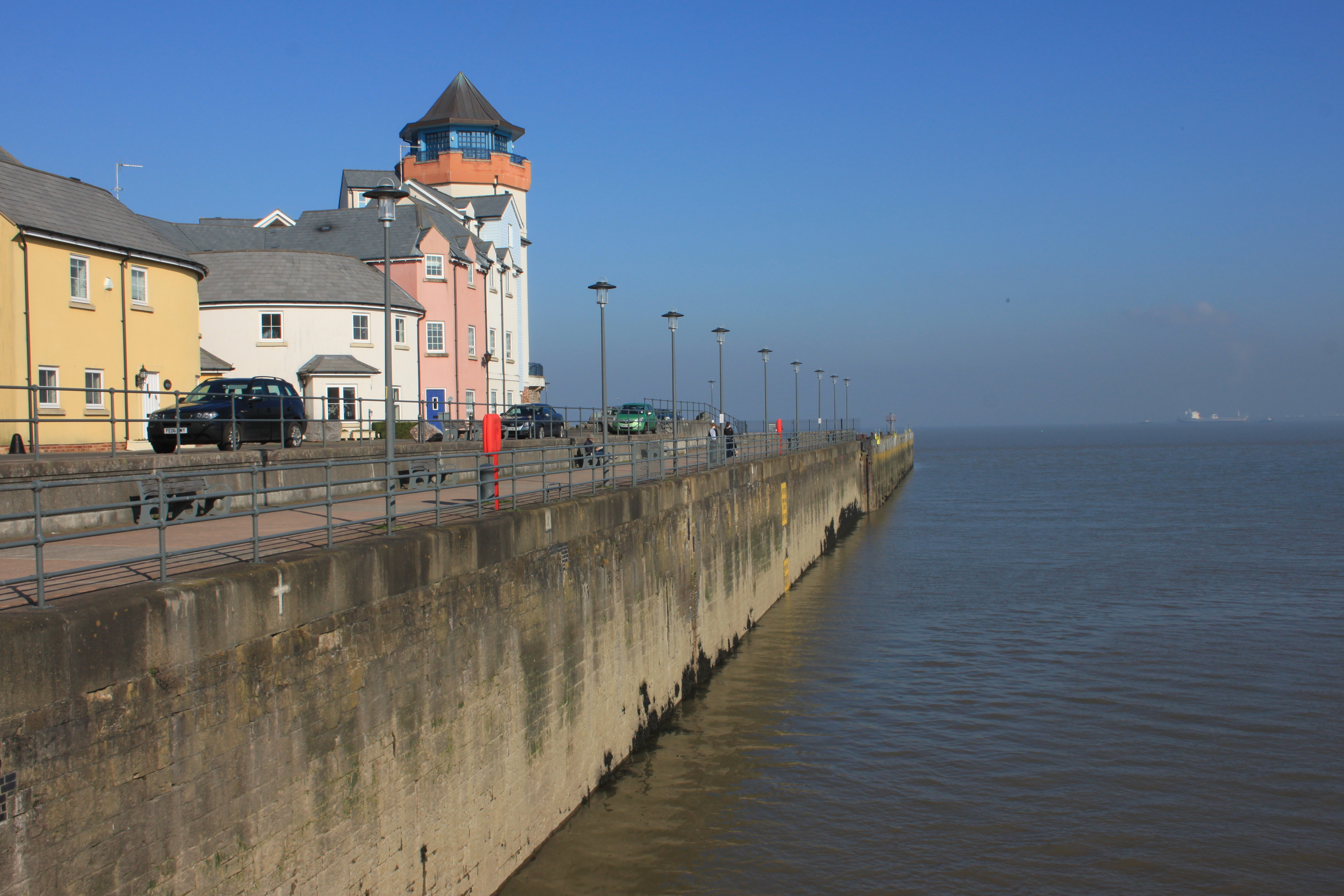
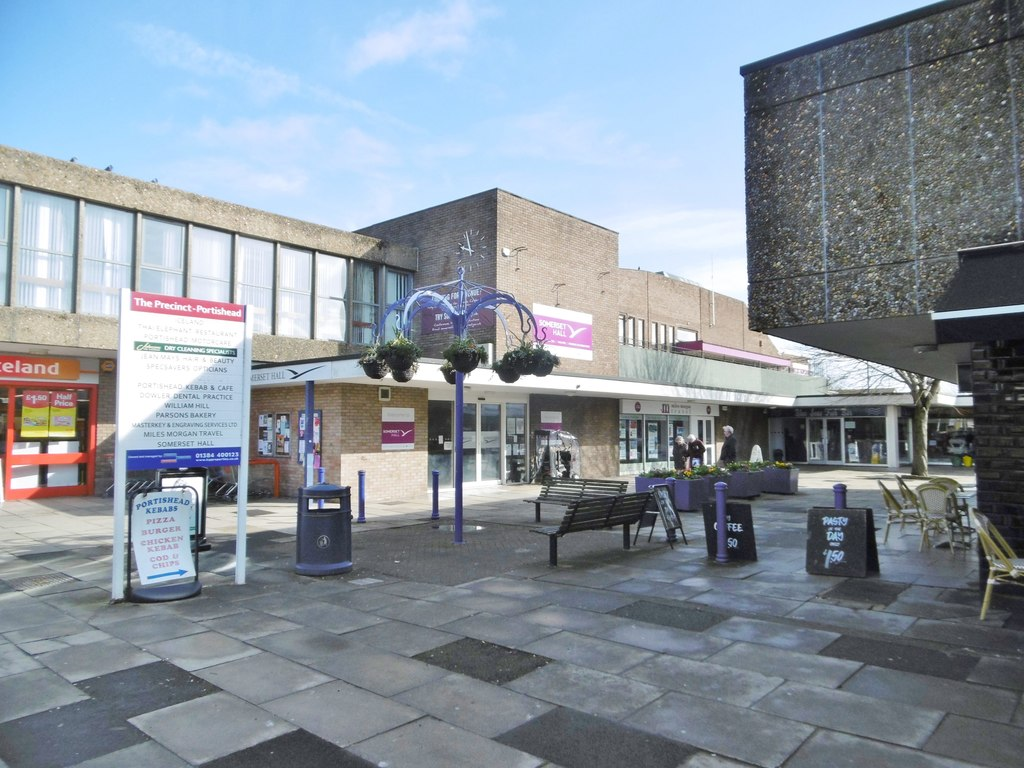
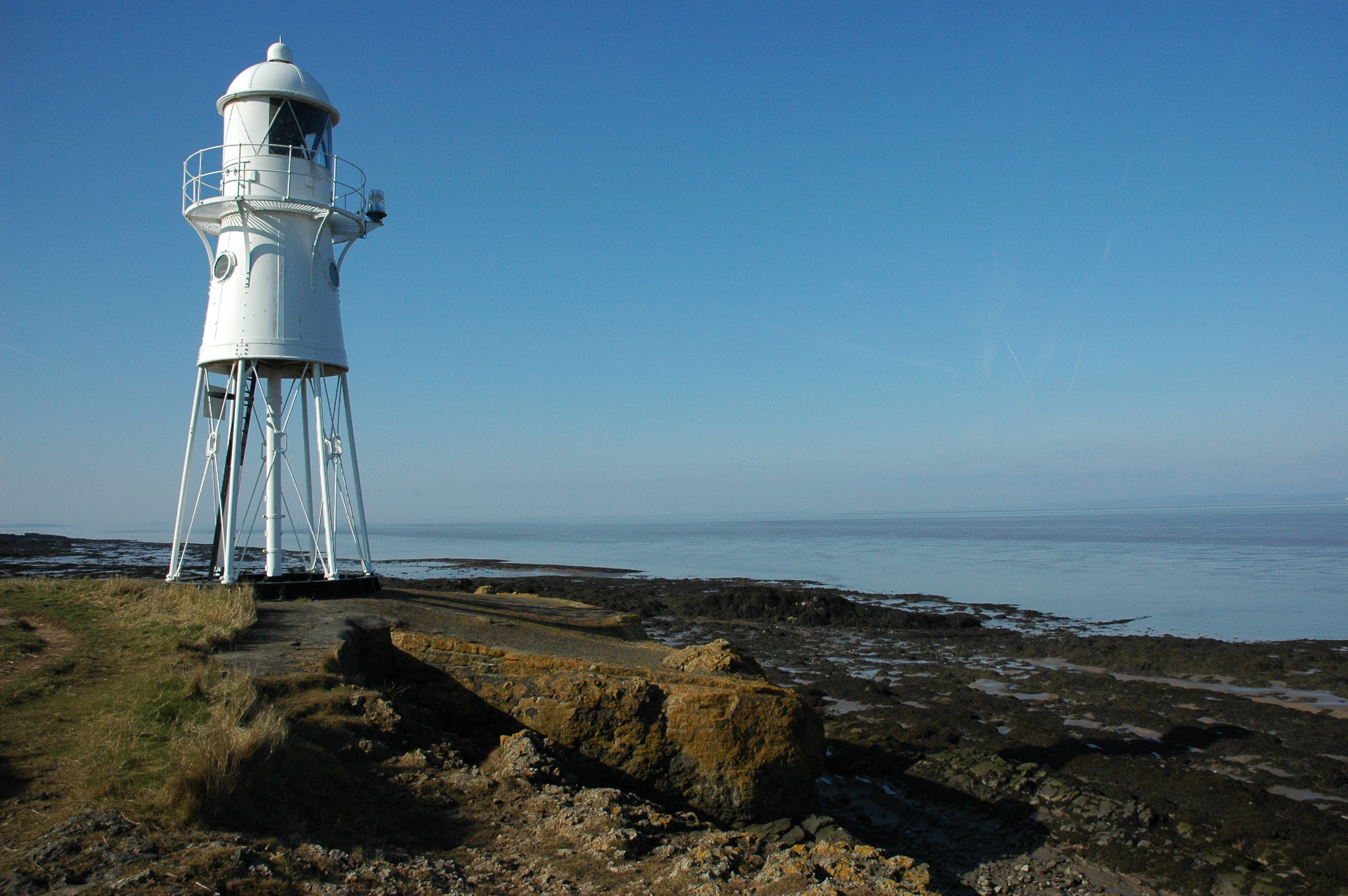
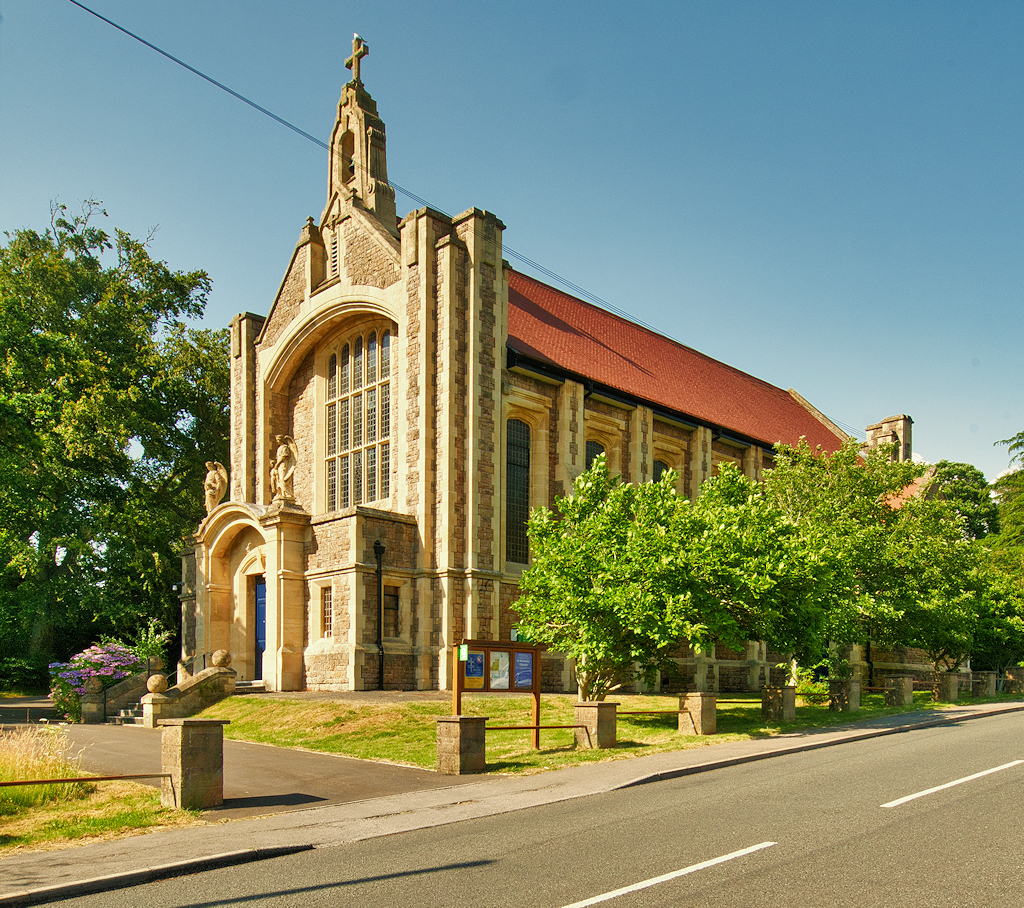
- From the top to bottom-right, Portishead Marina and Port Marine, The Seafront, Town Centre, Black Nore Lighthouse, St Nicholas' Church

- Location within Somerset
- Population: 26,366 (Parish, 2021); 26,355 (Built up area, 2021)
- OS grid reference: ST470764
- Civil parish: Portishead
- Unitary authority: North Somerset
- Ceremonial county: Somerset
- Region: South West
- Country: England
- Sovereign state: United Kingdom
- Post town: BRISTOL
- Postcode district: BS20
- Dialling code: 01275
- Police: Avon and Somerset
- Fire: Avon
- Ambulance: South Western
- UK Parliament: North Somerset

Portishead (/ˈpɔːrtɪshɛd/ PORT-iss-hed) is a town and civil parish in the North Somerset unitary authority area, in the county of Somerset, England. With a population of 26,366 at the 2021 Census, the town is located on the Severn Estuary opposite Cardiff and Newport in Wales. The town is 8 miles (13 km) to the west of Bristol and 18 miles northeast of Weston-super-Mare and approximately 110 miles (180 km) west of London.

Portishead has a long history as a fishing port. As a royal manor it expanded rapidly during the early 19th century around the docks, with supporting transport infrastructure. A power station and chemical works were added in the 20th century, but the dock and industrial facilities have since closed and have been redeveloped into a marina and residential areas. Portishead was also the telephone control centre used by British Telecom (BT) for non-direct dialled calls to maritime vessels, a service known as Portishead Radio. The headquarters of both Avon and Somerset Constabulary and Avon Fire and Rescue Service are in Portishead. Portishead Lifeboat Station is situated close to the marina. Run solely by local Royal National Lifeboat Institution (RNLI) volunteers, it serves the waters of the Severn estuary and inland waterways into the city of Bristol.

== History ==
The name Portishead derives from the "port at the head of the river". It has been called 'Portshead' and 'Portschute' at times in its history and Portesheve in the Domesday Book, and was locally known as Posset.

The town's recorded history dates back to Roman times, although there is also evidence of prehistoric settlement, including polished flint axe heads. There were also Iron Age settlements in the area, of which Cadbury Camp was the largest. Other sites that have been identified include a 1,200 by 600 feet (370 by 180 m) site that was successively occupied by the Romans, Britons and Danes. There is some evidence that it may have been the western end of the Wansdyke, an early medieval or possibly Roman boundary with a series of defensive linear earthworks extending to the Savernake Forest near Marlborough in Wiltshire.

After the Norman conquest the manor was held by the Bishop of Coutances and later reverted to the Crown, after which William II gave it to a merchant from Bristol known as Harding and then to his son Robert Fitzharding, who became Lord of Berkeley. The Berkeley family held it for generations until it passed by marriage to the Cokes of Holkham in Norfolk. In the 14th century it belonged to Everard le Frenshe. In 1621 the Bristol Corporation purchased large portions of land in Portishead and revived the Manor Court. The rights of the corporation over the manor were disputed, but they held it until 1836, when they sold it for £8,050. The parish of Portishead was part of the Portbury Hundred.

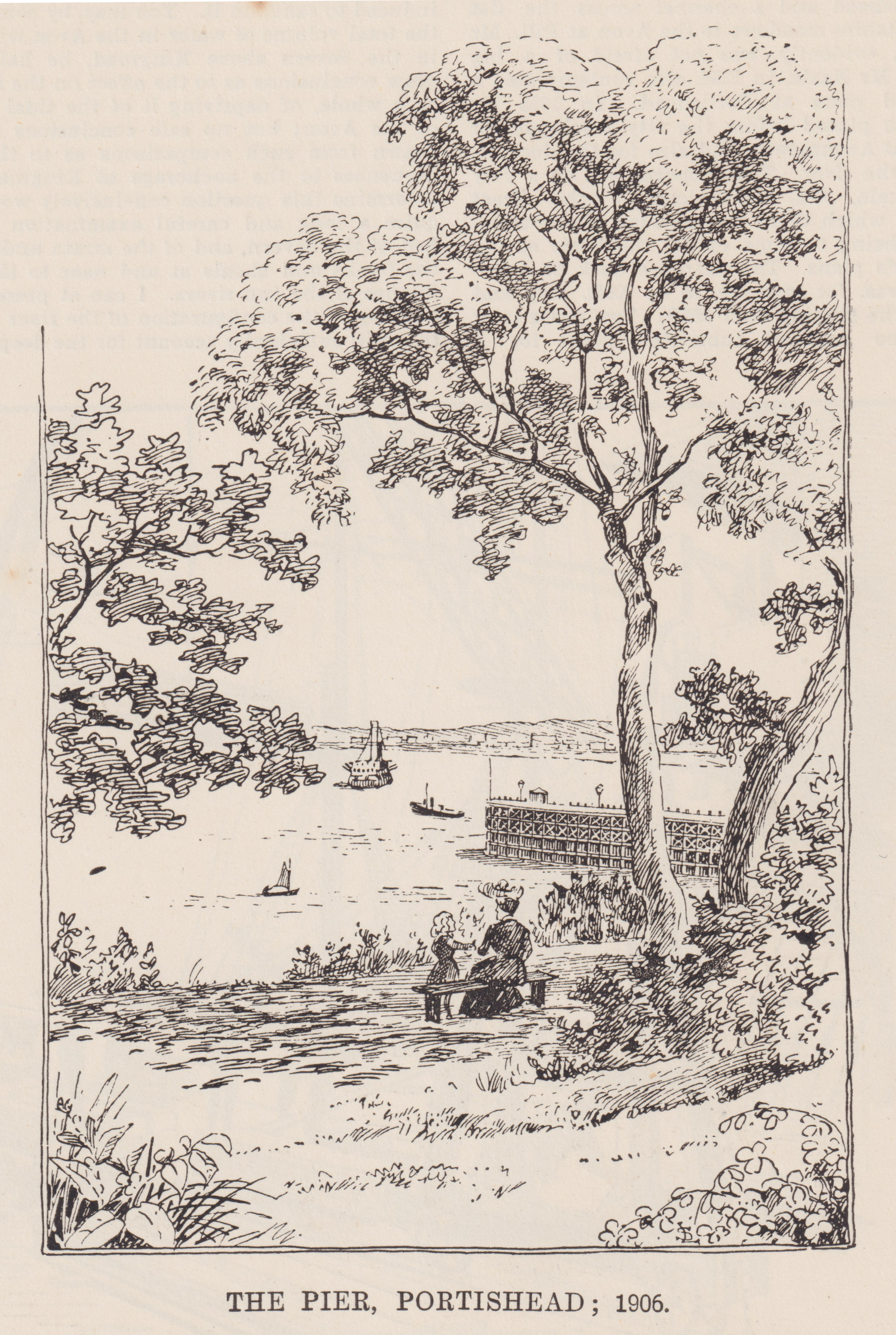
Portishead Pier, 1906

The town was built at the mouth of a small tributary of the Severn Estuary near the mouth of the River Avon. The old pill or jetty provided protection for craft against the Bristol Channel's large tidal range, and iron rings can be seen in the high street at which fishing boats used to moor. Its position meant Portishead was used to guard the "King Road", as the waters around the headland are called. In 1497 it was the departure point for John Cabot on the Matthew. A fort was built on Battery Point, and was used during the English Civil War when the town supported the Royalists, but surrendered to Fairfax in 1645. Guns were also placed at Battery Point during World War II. The King Road was the site of a naval action in 1758 when HMS Antelope captured Belliqueux, one of a French squadron returning from Quebec.

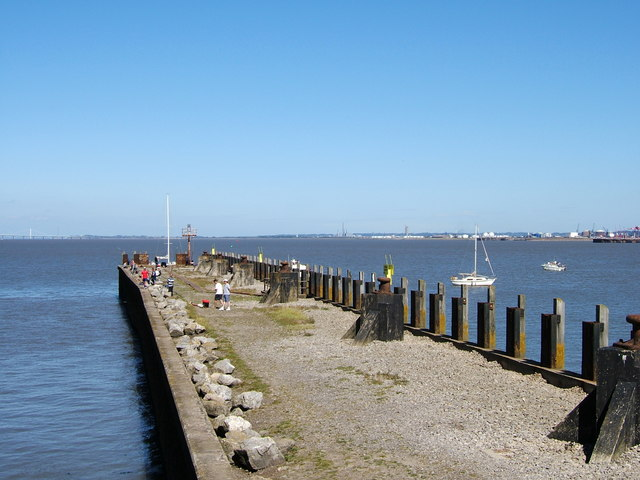
The steamer pier from the Royal Hotel

A mill was built on Welhay stream but this was replaced by tidal mills. In the 17th century the City of Bristol bought the manors of North Weston and Portishead for access to the channel and as a place to stay outside of the city and, in the 19th century, as a seaside resort. An outer sea wall was built, allowing the local marshes to be drained and increasing the land available for farming. The dominant architecture is early Victorian, with some buildings maintaining their original features. The expansion in residential property coincided with the construction of the dock, pier and the rail link to Bristol. The Royal Hotel by the pier was built in a Tudor Gothic style in 1830, to provide accommodation and catering for travellers on the steamers from Bristol, Wales and Ireland.

=== Portishead dock ===
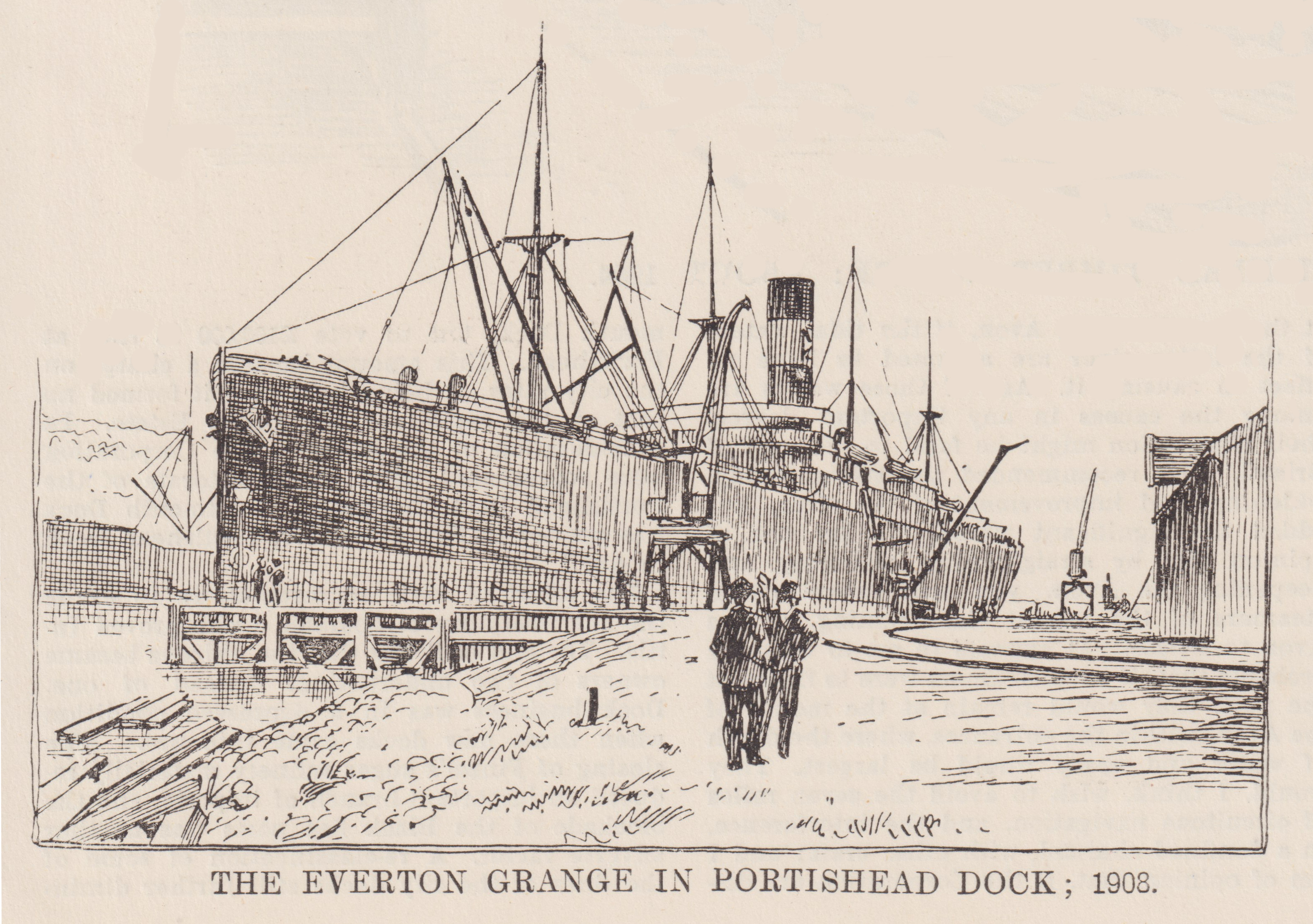
Portishead Dock, 1908

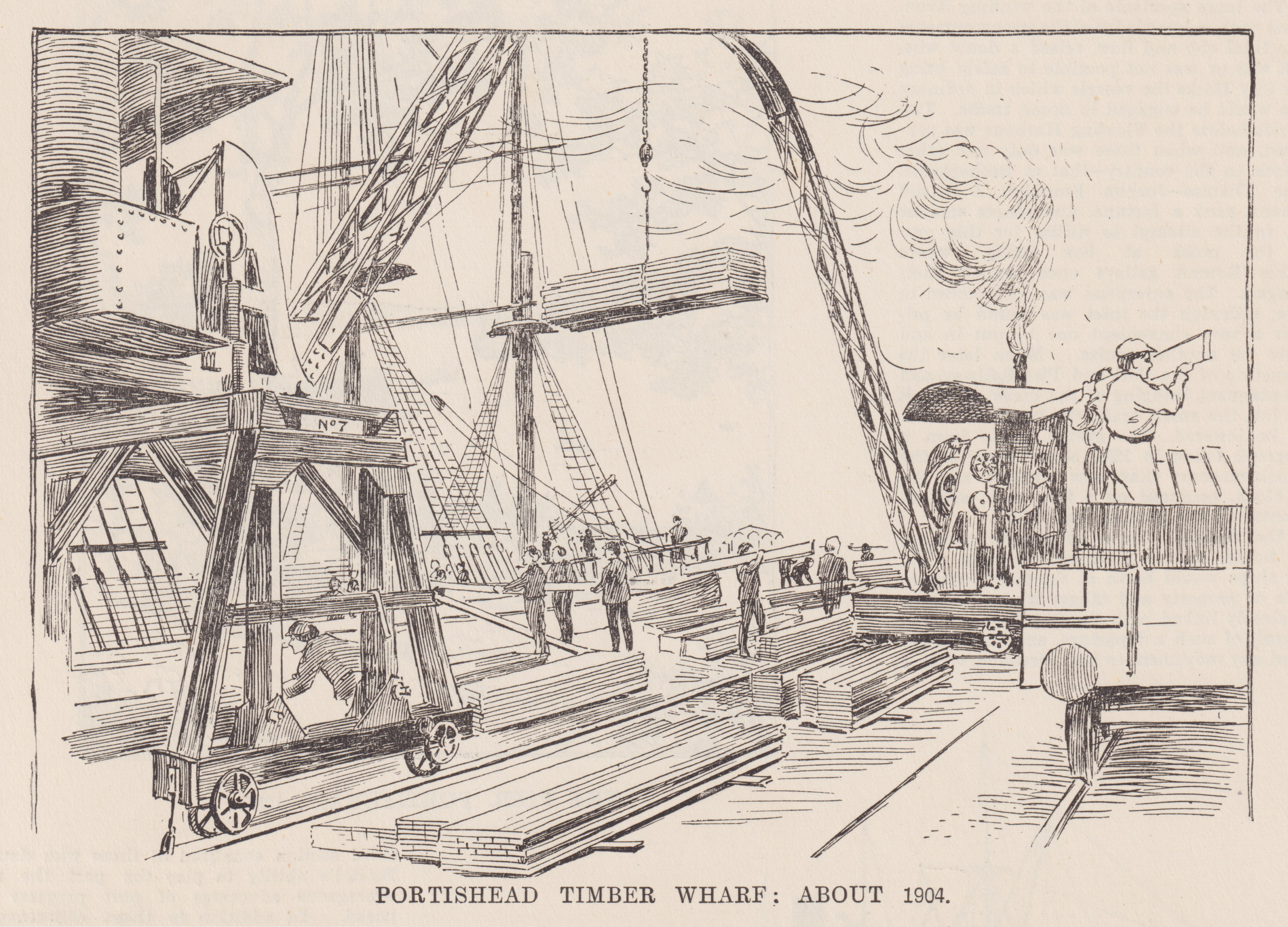
Portishead Timber Wharf, 1904

The act of Parliament governing the enclosure of Portishead was passed in 1814, and stipulated the right to a public wharf, although there is historical evidence of nautical connections dating back to the Patent Rolls of 1331. Around the 1860s, at the height of the iron and steel era, a pier and a deep-water dock were built by the Bristol & Portishead Pier and Railway to accommodate the large ships that had difficulty in reaching Bristol Harbour. They brought valuable cargoes from across the globe and exported local products overseas. Ships carrying coal were commonplace in Portishead Docks.

In the 1880s Portishead Dock was acquired by Bristol Corporation, and was subsequently managed as part of the Port of Bristol until its closure.

=== Portishead power stations ===
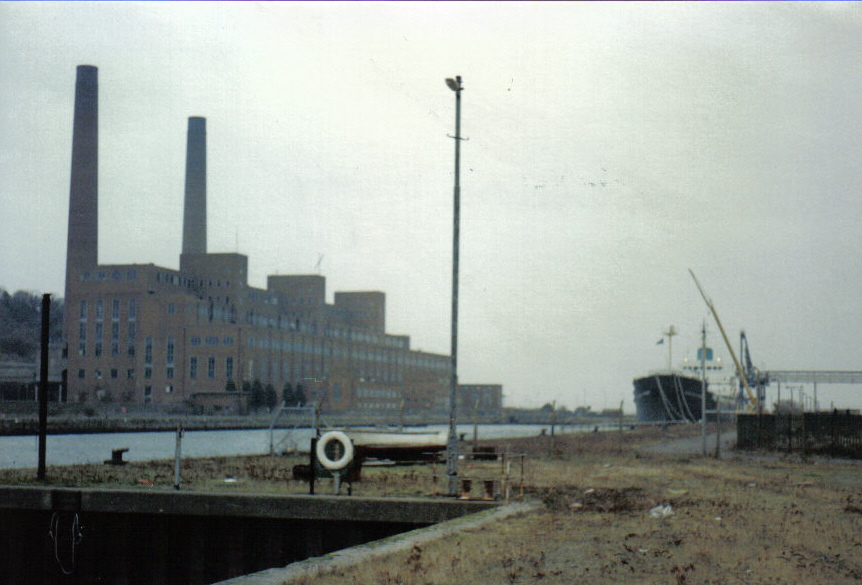
Portishead B power station in 1989

The Portishead power stations were coal-fed power stations built next to the dock. Construction work started on Portishead "A" power station in 1926. It began generating electricity in 1929 for the Bristol Corporation's Electricity Department. In 1937 its original six short chimney stacks were replaced by a 350 ft (110 m) high stack. A second 350 ft (110 m) stack was added when the power station was expanded in 1948.

Construction of Portishead "B" power station began in 1949; it became operational in 1955. The power stations became part of the nationalised electricity industry after 1949, and were operated in turn by the British Electricity Authority, the Central Electricity Authority and the CEGB. They used some local coal produced in the Somerset coalfield, which was delivered by train along the Portishead branch of the Great Western Railway (GWR). The line had opened on 12 April 1867 as the Bristol and Portishead Pier and Railway Company; it opened to the dock on 5 July 1879. The main supply of coal was imported by boat from Newport and Ely in South Wales; it was carried by Osborn & Wallis of Bristol.

=== Railways ===
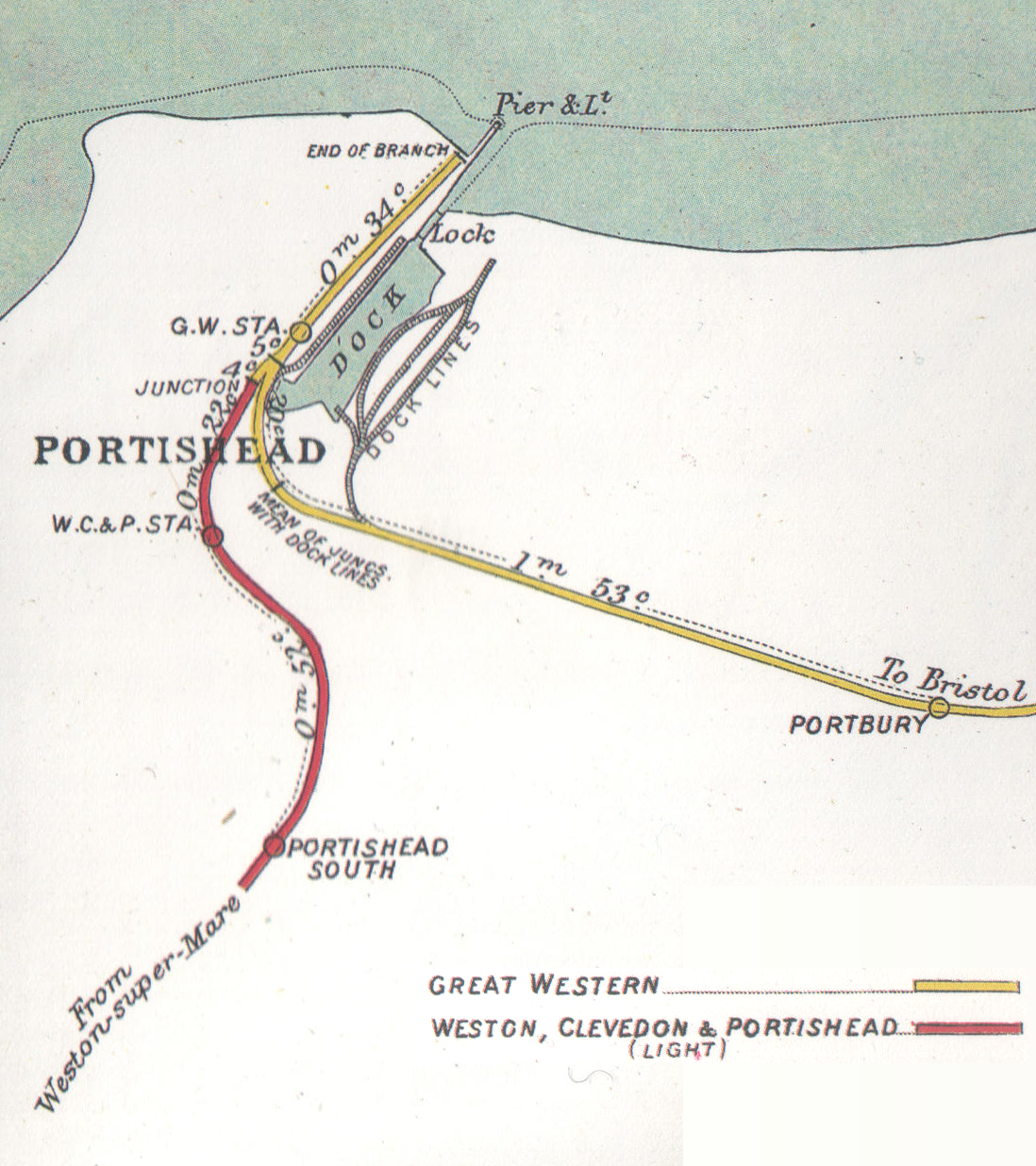
Railway map from 1914

Portishead had two passenger stations on the GWR's Portishead branch line. The main station was near the centre of the village of Portishead, as it was then; the other was at the pier. The construction of Portishead "B" power station caused the original railway station to be demolished and a replacement station was opened in the High Street on 2 January 1954. The new station closed on 7 September 1964.

The majority of the line was reopened in 2002, to transport goods from the Royal Portbury Dock. A new junction was created, 3 miles (5 km) from Portishead station, and a new goods line built from there to the Royal Portbury Dock. There is a campaign group aimed at reopening the station and the short stretch of unopened line. The campaign was successful and the go-ahead was given in 2025. The re-opening of the line is expected to be in 2028.

Portishead also had a second, short-lived, railway line: the Weston, Clevedon and Portishead Railway. It ran between Weston-super-Mare and Clevedon as a standard railway line, and between Clevedon and Portishead as a light railway. The Clevedon to Portishead extension opened on 7 August 1907. The line closed on 19 May 1940 and was then dismantled by the GWR.

=== Albright and Wilson ===
In 1951, Albright and Wilson built a chemical works on the opposite side of the dock from the power stations. The chemical works produced white phosphorus from phosphate rock imported, through the docks, into the UK. Phosphate rock was stored in concrete silos on the dockside until it was required. Electricity provided by the local power stations was used to run six 7.5 megawatt electric arc furnaces (45 MW total) that reduced the phosphate rock. The phosphorus was then moved in sealed railway tanks to Oldbury and to Kirkby. After the closure of the factory the decontamination included the removal of yellow (spontaneously combustible) and red allotropes of phosphorus. The site is now home to Portishead volunteer coastguard.

=== Closure of the dock and associated facilities ===
The onset of new generating capacity at Pembroke (oil-fired) and Didcot (coal-fired) in the mid-1970s brought about the closure of the older, less efficient "A" Station. One generator (500 MW) of four at each of the new power stations had almost the same output of both Portishead Stations combined ("A" Station 200 MW, "B" Station 360 MW).

The newer of the two power stations ("B" Station) was converted to burn oil when the Somerset coalfields closed. The two Radstock pits ceased production in September 1973 and the last train load of coal departed on 16 November 1973. The price of oil rose steeply in the 1970s (see 1973 oil crisis and 1979 oil crisis) and the two power stations were little used after these events.

Portishead "A" power station was closed in 1976; and the first of its two chimney stacks, a landmark, was demolished in September 1981, followed by the second in August 1982. Portishead "B" power station closed in 1982 and both of its 383 feet (117 m) stacks were demolished in October 1992.

Industrial activities ceased at the dock with the closure of the power stations. The Port of Bristol Authority finally closed the dock in 1992.

=== Modern marina development ===
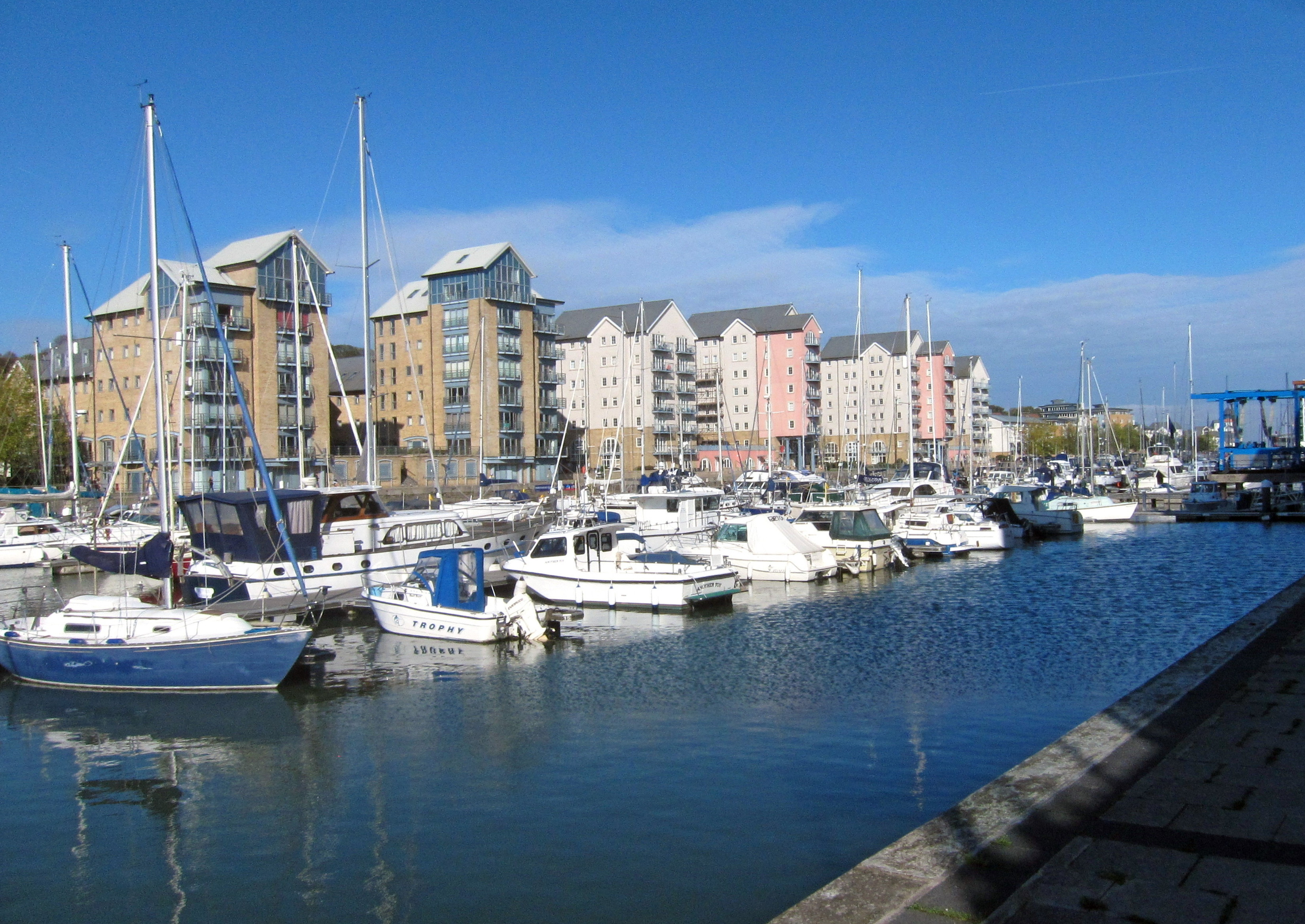
Portishead Marina

Much of the growth of Portishead's population can be attributed to the development of the former docks. The former deep-water dock, used to supply coal and goods to the power stations, has been fully redeveloped into a modern marina with 250 pontoon berths.

The areas on each side of the marina, formerly occupied by the two power stations and chemical plant, have been redeveloped to provide a wide range of housing, from town houses to social housing to exclusive flats. Development has also completed on the Portbury Ashlands to the east of the harbour (so-called because they were the dumping ground for power station waste) extending the area of the town further towards Portbury. Next to the Ashlands development lies Portbury Ashlands Nature Reserve.

This waterfront development is known as Port Marine. The area has varied styles of houses and apartments, including an area built in the style of a fishing village, which is modelled on the Cornish seaside town of Polperro with narrow streets and multi-coloured properties.

At the top of the marina sits a new RNLI lifeboat station, opened in 2015 and run by around 40 local volunteer crew. An RNLI shop, open daily, is attached to the lifeboat station.

=== Portishead Radio ===
Portishead was previously the telephone control centre used by British Telecom (BT) for non-direct dialled calls to maritime vessels, a service known as "Portishead Radio". This has now been largely replaced by INMARSAT, which permits directly dialled calls made from any BT landline in the UK. The radio station had separate transmitting and receiving stations. They were constructed by the Marconi Wireless Telegraph Company and operated by the General Post Office (GPO). By 1936, the station had a staff of 60 radio officers who handled over 3 million words of radio traffic per year. Following the privatisation of the GPO's telephone network in 1981, the station was operated by British Telecommunications PLC (now known as BT Group PLC). The main transmitting station, which was remotely operated, originally consisted of a large array of radio masts at nearby Portishead Downs but was replaced by a single radio mast at Clevedon. It was used until the 1970s. The receiving station's control centre and radio masts were located at Highbridge, near Burnham-on-Sea.

The radio station played a vital role during the Second World War in maintaining communications with the British merchant navy and with patrol aircraft in the North Atlantic. During the war, all communications with ships were one-way in order to avoid revealing the ships' locations to the enemy. The station was short-staffed because many were on secondments to various government services, such as operating other radio stations and training new radio officers to work in naval convoys. In 1943, the workload was so great that a Royal Navy officer and 18 telegraphists were brought in from HMS Flowerdown, a Naval Shore Wireless Service station near Winchester.

By the end of the 1980s, satellite communications had started to take an increasing share of the station's business, and a programme of severe rationalisation began, leading to the closure of two transmitting sites at Leafield and Ongar. In the radio station's penultimate year to March 1999, there were on average, per month, 571 radio telegrams, 533 radio telephone calls and 4,001 radio telex calls. In 1998, British Telecom Maritime Radio Services announced its planned closure of Portishead Radio. The long-range services (HF bands 3–30 MHz) ceased at midnight on 31 August 1999. The short-range VHF maritime band services (156–174 MHz) closed at 12:00 on Sunday 30 April 2000, and the medium-range services (MF maritime band 1.6–3.0 MHz) at 12:00 on Friday 30 June. The station closed in April 2000. The Highbridge station has been demolished. Sedgemoor District Council adopted a local development plan in September 2004 that included the site of the receiving station for future housing development. Planning permission was granted in October 2007 for a development of 190 houses and flats on the site and shortly afterwards the old radio station buildings were demolished.

== Governance ==
There are two tiers of local government covering Portishead, at parish (town) and unitary authority level: Portishead Town Council and North Somerset Council, although the area below high-water mark, including the pier, is within Bristol. The town council is based at the Folk Hall at 95 High Street.

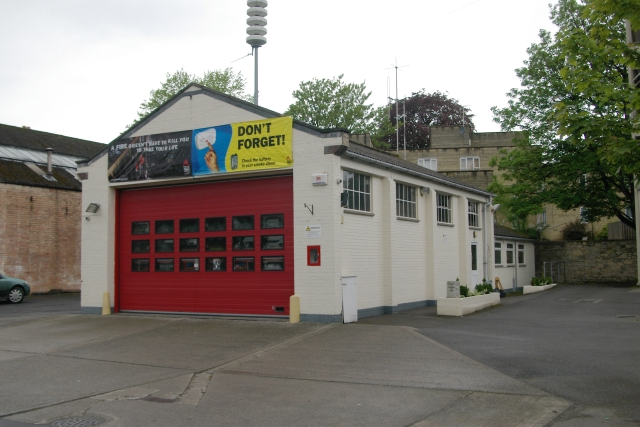
Portishead Fire Station

The police service is provided by Avon and Somerset Constabulary. Avon Fire and Rescue Service has a fire station in Portishead staffed by retained firefighters, equipped with two water tenders each holding 1,800 litres. The South Western Ambulance Service has responsibility for the area.

=== Administrative history ===
Portishead was an ancient parish. Until 1892 it was governed by its vestry. In 1892 the more built-up part of the parish was converted into a local government district, governed by a local board. Such local government districts were reconstituted as urban districts under the Local Government Act 1894, which also said that parishes could no longer straddle district boundaries. The part of the parish outside the urban district therefore became a separate parish called North Weston.

Portishead Urban District was abolished in 1974, becoming part of the Woodspring district of Avon. Woodspring subsequently became the unitary authority of North Somerset in 1996. A successor parish was created in 1974 covering the former urban district of Portishead. In 1993 North Weston was reunited with Portishead, with the enlarged parish being named "North Weston and Portishead" from the merger on 1 April 1993, with the order of the names being swapped two months later on 1 June 1993 to be "Portishead and North Weston". The parish name was changed back to just Portishead in 2011, when the parish also gained some territory from neighbouring Portbury.

=== Constituencies ===
The parish is part of the North Somerset county constituency of the House of Commons. It was represented between 1992 and 2024 by Liam Fox, a member of the Conservative Party, who was Secretary of State for Defence and Secretary of State for International Trade. Since 2024 it has been represented by Sadik Al-Hassan.

Prior to Brexit in 2020, it was in the South West England constituency of the European Parliament.

== Geography ==
=== Physical geography ===
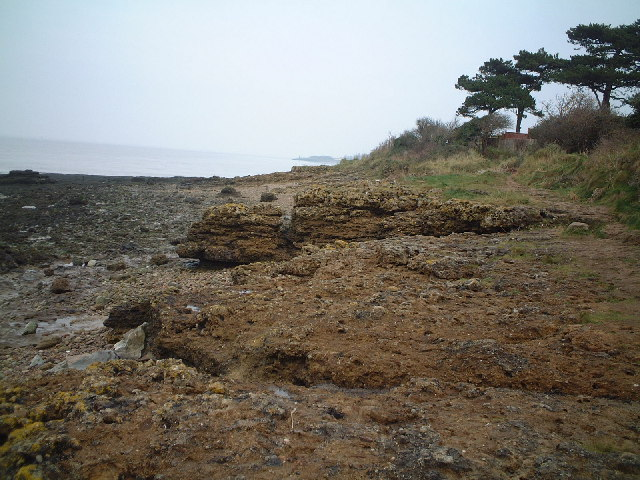
Black Nore

Portishead is a coastal town on the Severn Estuary. It lies north east of Clevedon and immediately south west of Avonmouth just across the River Avon, which forms the boundary between Somerset and Bristol. The city of Bristol is 6 miles (9.7 km) to the east and Portishead is approximately 110 miles (180 km) west of London. On clear days, Wales can be seen across the Severn Estuary from the town. The Eastwood area has been designated as a local nature reserve. It consists broadleaf woodland on a coastal limestone ridge which leads to Battery Point which had a defensive gun position and Portishead Point Lighthouse is on the promontory. There is also geological interest in the fossils, folds and faults found in the area.

The area immediately inland includes the Gordano Valley, which has been designated as a national nature reserve. The valley runs roughly north-east to south-west, between Carboniferous limestone ridges extending along the coastline between Clevedon and Portishead, and another ridge extending between Clevedon and Easton in Gordano. The area includes the villages of Clapton in Gordano, Weston in Gordano, Easton in Gordano, Walton in Gordano, Portbury and Sheepway. The M5 motorway runs along the south side of the valley, splitting briefly into two levels – the south-west-bound level running above the north-east-bound carriageway. The Gordano motorway service station is at the eastern end of the valley, near the Royal Portbury Dock and the Avonmouth Bridge. There is no river Gordano – much of the valley is reclaimed land barely above sea level, drained by ditches (known locally as "rhynes"). The rhynes previously managed by the now amalgamated Gordano Valley Internal Drainage Board are now the responsibility of the North Somerset Internal Drainage Board. An area comprising a total of 400 acres (160 ha) has been designated as a biological and geological Site of Special Scientific Interest, for ornithological, entomological and stratigraphic interest, notification originally having taken place in 1971. Several sites in the valley are managed by the Avon Wildlife Trust as nature reserves. These include Weston Big Wood, Clapton Moor, Weston Moor and Walton Common. The name Gordano comes from Old English and is descriptive of the triangular shape of the whole valley from Clevedon to Portishead, being the ablative singular of the Latinised form of Gorden meaning muddy valley.

Denny Island is a small rocky island of 0.6 acres (0.2 ha), with scrub vegetation, approximately three miles north of Portishead. Its rocky southern foreshore marks the boundary between England and Wales, but the island itself is reckoned administratively to Monmouthshire, Wales. The tidal rise and fall in the Severn Estuary and Bristol Channel can be as great as 49 ft (15 m), second only to Bay of Fundy in Eastern Canada. There has been concern about pollution levels from industrial areas in Wales and at the eastern end of the Bristol Channel; however, this tends to be diluted by the Atlantic waters. There are measurable levels of chemical pollutants, but little is known about their effects. Of particular concern are the levels of cadmium and to a lesser degree residual pesticides and hydrocarbons.

Portishead Pier to Black Nore SSSI is a 177-acre (72 ha) geological Site of Special Scientific Interest notified in 1952. The Portishead Pier Section is made up of alluvial sandstones, the best exposure of Upper Carboniferous rocks in the Avonmouth Coalfield. The cliff and foreshore exposures around Portishead Point provide important exposures of geological structures formed during the Variscan mountain building episode in the Carboniferous Period of geological history. Also included are important exposures of the Devonian sequence that yield several species of fossil fish. Holoptychius scales are the most abundant fossils, but teeth scales of other species are also relatively common. Notably amongst the collection from this bed are plates of arthrodires, including Groenlandaspis. Eastwood and Battery Point Local Nature Reserve is a 9 hectares (22 acres) woodland containing Yew, Maple, Dogs mercury and beech.

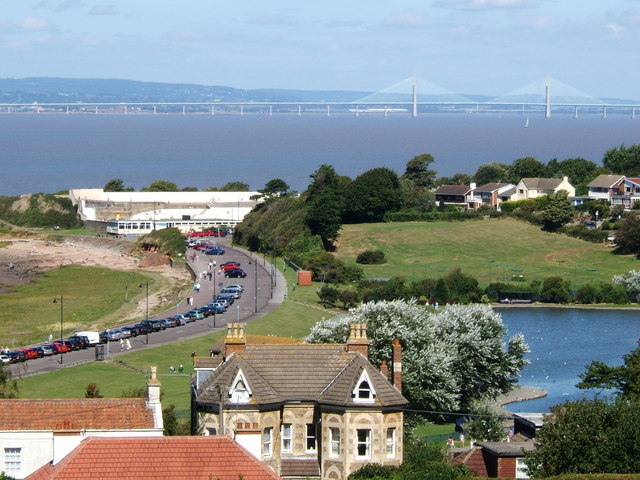
Artificial lake (right) and outdoor swimming pools (left) in the foreground, with Severn Estuary and Second Severn Crossing in background

The Lake Grounds area, built in the early 20th century around an artificial lake, is the town's main park. Adjacent to the beach and esplanade is a 100-year-old artificial lake, and a cricket pitch surrounded by sloping lawns interspersed with specimen trees. Portishead Open Air Pool, one of the UK's few surviving outdoor swimming pools, is situated on the shore next to the lake grounds and is open during the summer months. In 2009, the outdoor pool was renovated by a team filming for the American TV programme Ty Pennington's Great British Adventure. Above the lake grounds is Battery Point, where a gun battery was sited to protect the Severn Estuary from invasion.

=== Climate ===
Along with the rest of South West England, Portishead has a temperate climate generally wetter and milder than the rest of England. The annual mean temperature is about 10 °C (50 °F) with seasonal and diurnal variations, but the modifying effect of the sea restricts the range to less than that in most other parts of the United Kingdom. January is the coldest month, with mean minimum temperatures between 1 °C (34 °F) and 2 °C (36 °F). July and August are the warmest, with mean daily maxima around 21 °C (70 °F). In general, December is the dullest month and June the sunniest. The south-west of England enjoys a favoured location, particularly in summer, when the Azores High extends its influence north-eastwards towards the UK.

Cloud often forms inland, especially near hills, and reduces exposure to sunshine. The average annual sunshine is about 1,600 hours. Rainfall tends to be associated with Atlantic depressions or with convection. In summer, convection caused by solar surface heating sometimes forms shower clouds and a large proportion of the annual precipitation falls from showers and thunderstorms at this time of year. Average rainfall is around 800–900 mm (31–35 in). About 8–15 days of snowfall is typical. November to March have the highest mean wind speeds, with June to August having the lightest; the prevailing wind direction is from the south-west.

== Demography ==
Portishead had a population of 22,000 in 2016, an increase of over 3,000 since the figure of 17,130 recorded in the 2001 census, with a growth rate of 40 per cent; which is considerably in excess of surrounding towns. As the result of a housebuilding programme, a further 8,000 people are expected to settle in the area by 2026, making Portishead one of the largest towns in North Somerset.

== Landmarks ==
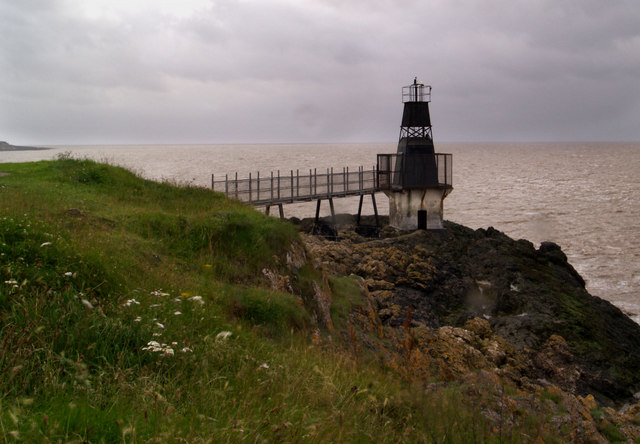
Portishead Point Lighthouse also known as Battery Point lighthouse

Court House Farmhouse dates from the medieval period but was remodelled in the 17th and 19th centuries. The Grade II* listed building is owned by Bristol City Council and in 2010 protests from local residents attempted to stop its sale.

The red brick National Nautical School was built by Edward Gabriel in 1905, at a cost of £30,000. Previously it had been based on the training ship HMS Formidable and operated until 1983. It is now part of a private gated community known as Fedden Village.

The remains of a former windmill, built in 1832 but disused since 1846, were rebuilt into a two-storey house and then, in 1908, incorporated into a golf club house. The building has since been converted into a pub. A small, disused, black village pump remains in Portishead with a strapped down handle.

The 9-metre (30 ft) high Portishead Point Lighthouse was built at Battery Point in March 1931 by the Chance Brothers of Smethwick. The lighthouse is currently maintained by the Bristol Port Company. Black Nore Lighthouse was built in 1894, and was electrified in World War II. In October 2011, after it was no longer needed for navigational purposes, it was sold to a trust for preservation at a cost of £1.

The Royal Hotel in the area of Woodhill was designed and built to serve Brunel's railway line which finished a few steps away from the hotel. The original building survives as The Royal Inn pub. It was built in 1830 by the Corporation of Bristol (now known as Bristol City Council) in order to provide a hotel supporting the development of the seaside resort. It is thought to be the only seaside hotel to be built by a public authority during the nineteenth century. It is a Grade II listed building. The Royal closed during the latter half of 2022 for upgrades and building works. It is set to reopen in the summer of 2023 as a hotel once more.

== Transport ==
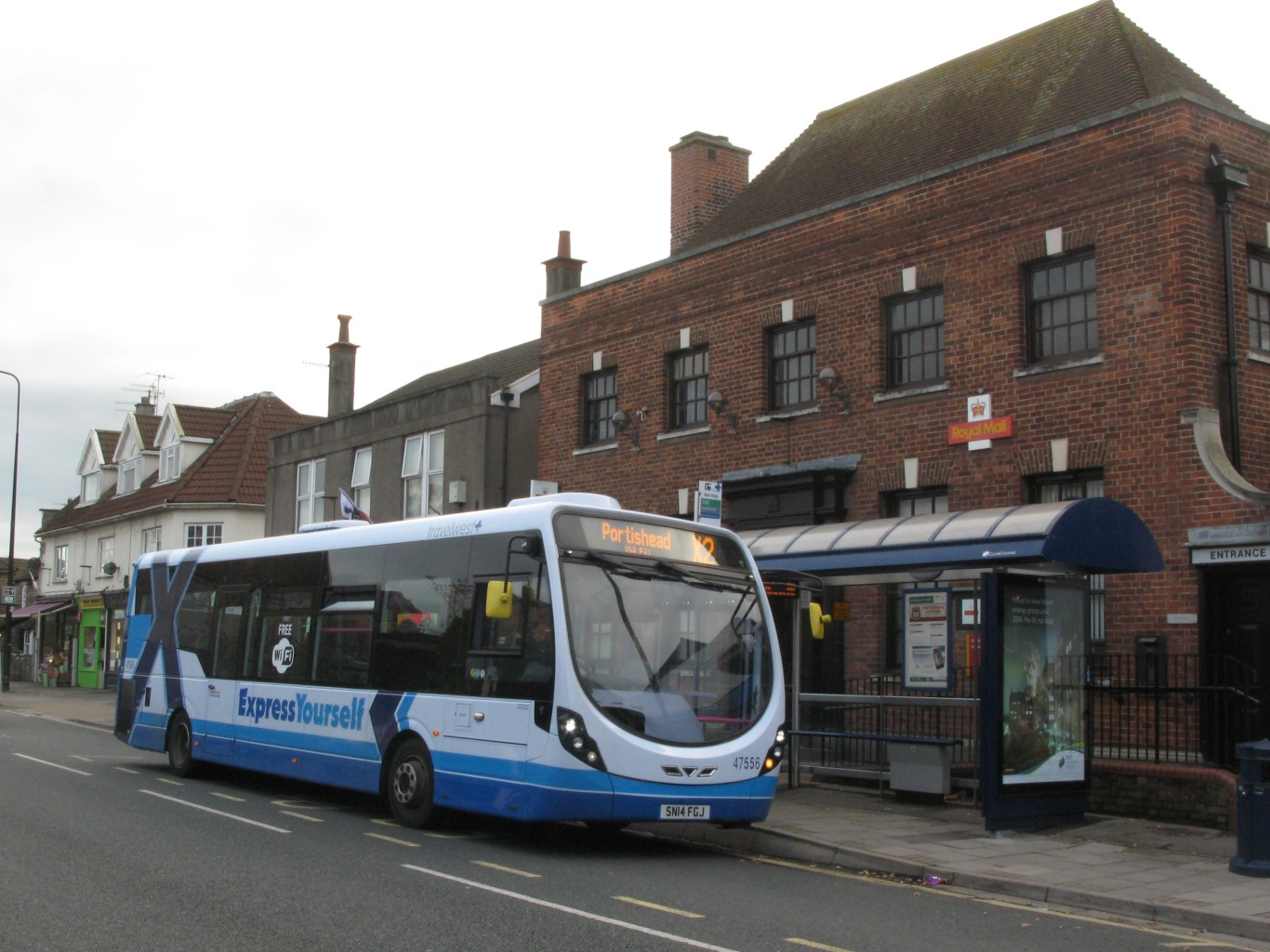
One of the Wright StreetLite buses introduced in 2014 outside the Post Office

Transport links to Bristol and beyond have long been a concern for many residents. In 2000 a group was set up to campaign for the reopening of the Portishead to Bristol railway line. In 2009 the cost was estimated at £28 million, but by 2024 this increased to £182 million. Full funding was agreed on 10 Feb 2025 by local authorities and the Department for Transport, and the line is due to open in 2027.

The main A369 road — known after the historical name for the area as "The Portbury Hundred", which links the town to the nearby M5 motorway — is prone to congestion, especially during rush hours. Major traffic-flow modifications have caused much controversy because they are widely seen as having caused queuing where none existed before. More than 4,000 residents signed a petition to North Somerset Council expressing concern at the development.

In September 2009 a trial was undertaken to turn off traffic lights in Portishead. It was conducted in association with North Somerset Council, Martin Cassini and Colin Buchanan. The change was made permanent after some journey times reportedly fell by over 50% with no measured reduction in pedestrian safety, despite greater numbers now using the route (over 2,000 vehicles and 300 pedestrians an hour).

Portishead is served by bus routes, including a half-hourly service to Bristol, an hourly service to Bristol Airport; as well as local buses to Clevedon and Weston-super-Mare. The WESTlink on-demand bus serves the town.

A lifeboat service has been operated by the Portishead Lifeboat Trust since 1996, but in 2015 this transferred to a new RNLI lifeboat station adjacent to the pier.

== Education ==
The Unitary Authority of North Somerset provides support for 78 schools, delivering education to approximately 28,000 pupils. Infant and primary schools in Portishead include: High Down Infant and Junior, Portishead Primary, St. Joseph's Catholic Primary, St. Peter's C of E Primary and Trinity Anglican Methodist Primary School. Secondary education is provided by Gordano School. In 1999, the school was awarded Specialist Schools Technology College status (see awards). Gordano School enrolls over 2000 students annually, ages 11–19. The official opening took place on 12 July 1957. The school had cost £146,000 and still needed work to the playing fields. By September of that year, pupil numbers had increased to 500 and councillors were demanding more classrooms. The increase was attributed to the "post-war bulge". In September 1975, £209,000 was allocated for new buildings. Gordano was named the "Big Experiment" as it became Somerset's first comprehensive school, with 900 students and 30 teachers. The education department forecast the school numbers would treble by 1975. In 1994, an astroturf sports playing surface was laid at a cost of £260,000. Numbers had grown to 1,589 students and 88 teachers. In 2009 the school was awarded academy status. Much redevelopment of the site has since occurred - these include a new specialised sixth-form center, an English block, a new maths building as well as extensions to the Science, Creative Arts and Design and Technology Buildings. Most recently there has been a new sports hall opened this includes a new gym and indoor sports facilities.

As of 1 September 2016 High Down Infant and Junior Schools, Gordano School, Portishead Primary School and St. Peter's C of E Primary School in the town, and St. Mary's in nearby Portbury formed a Multi Academy Trust (MAT) called The Lighthouse Partnership.

Trinity Anglican Methodist School has become part of the Bath & Wells Multi Academy Trust.

== Religious sites ==
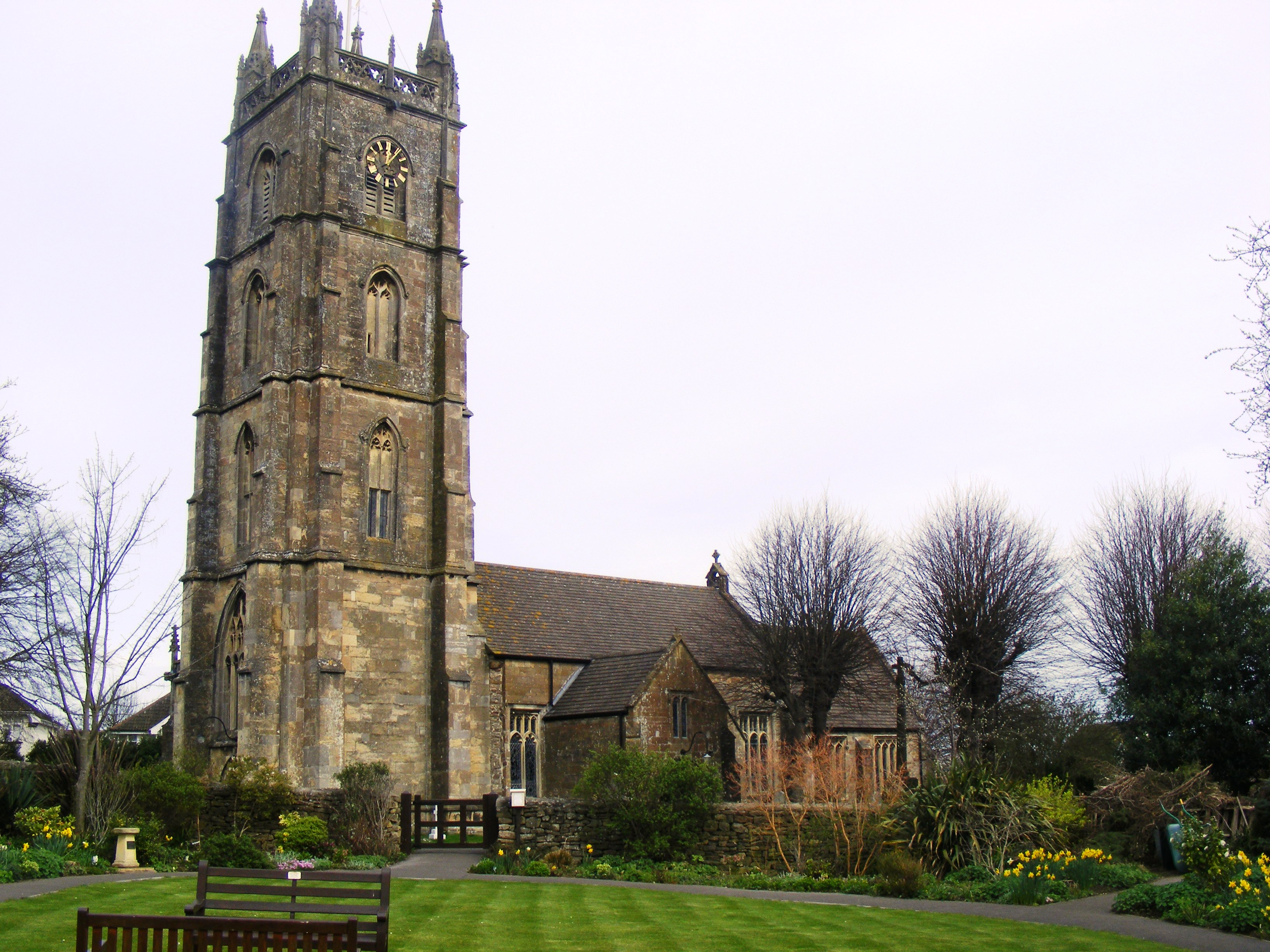
St Peter's Church and gardens

The Norman Church of St Peter (shown right) was built in 1320 and rebuilt in the 14th and 15th centuries in the Perpendicular Gothic style. In 1952 it was made a Grade I listed building. The four-stage tower is a prominent landmark, with set back buttresses and a pierced parapet. The church was altered in 1978–1979 and has a new garden developed for the Millennium.

The Chapel of Portishead National Nautical School (now The Fedden Village) on Nore Road dates back to 1911. It is dedicated to St. Nicholas and is also a listed building.

There is also a thriving URC church which dates from 6 March 1840. One of the early benefactors was Henry Overton Wills of the Wills tobacco family, who were staunch Congregationalists.

== Sport ==
Portishead has a sports and leisure complex, which was partly funded by the National Lottery as well as by funds from the Town Council and North Somerset Council. It houses a large swimming pool, leisure and play pools, indoor bowls, six badminton courts, a gymnasium, a fun room for toddlers, a cafeteria and a licensed bar. Other sporting facilities in the town include open-air tennis courts, a large outdoor swimming-pool opened in 1962 (and renovated in 2009), a boating lake, cricket ground, football and hockey pitches as well as many cycle lanes. The cricket club dates back to the 19th century.

Portishead Town F.C. played in small regional leagues for years until joining the Somerset County League in 1975. They won the Premier Division title four times in five years between 1993–94 and 1997–98. After their fourth successive runner-up campaign in the 2004–05 season, Portishead successfully applied for promotion to the Western League. In Portishead's first season of Western League football they finished in the top half of the table only to better their performance the following season. In 2006–07 Portishead achieved their highest ever finish in the history of the club, finishing runners-up to Truro City.

== Media ==
Regional TV news is provided by BBC West and ITV West Country. Television signals are received from the Mendip and the local relay transmitters.

Local radio stations are BBC Radio Bristol on 94.9 FM, Heart West on 96.3 FM, Greatest Hits Radio South West on 107.2 FM and Hits Radio Bristol & The South West on 106.5 FM.

The North Somerset Times (formerly known as Portishead Times) is the town's local weekly newspaper.

== Culture ==
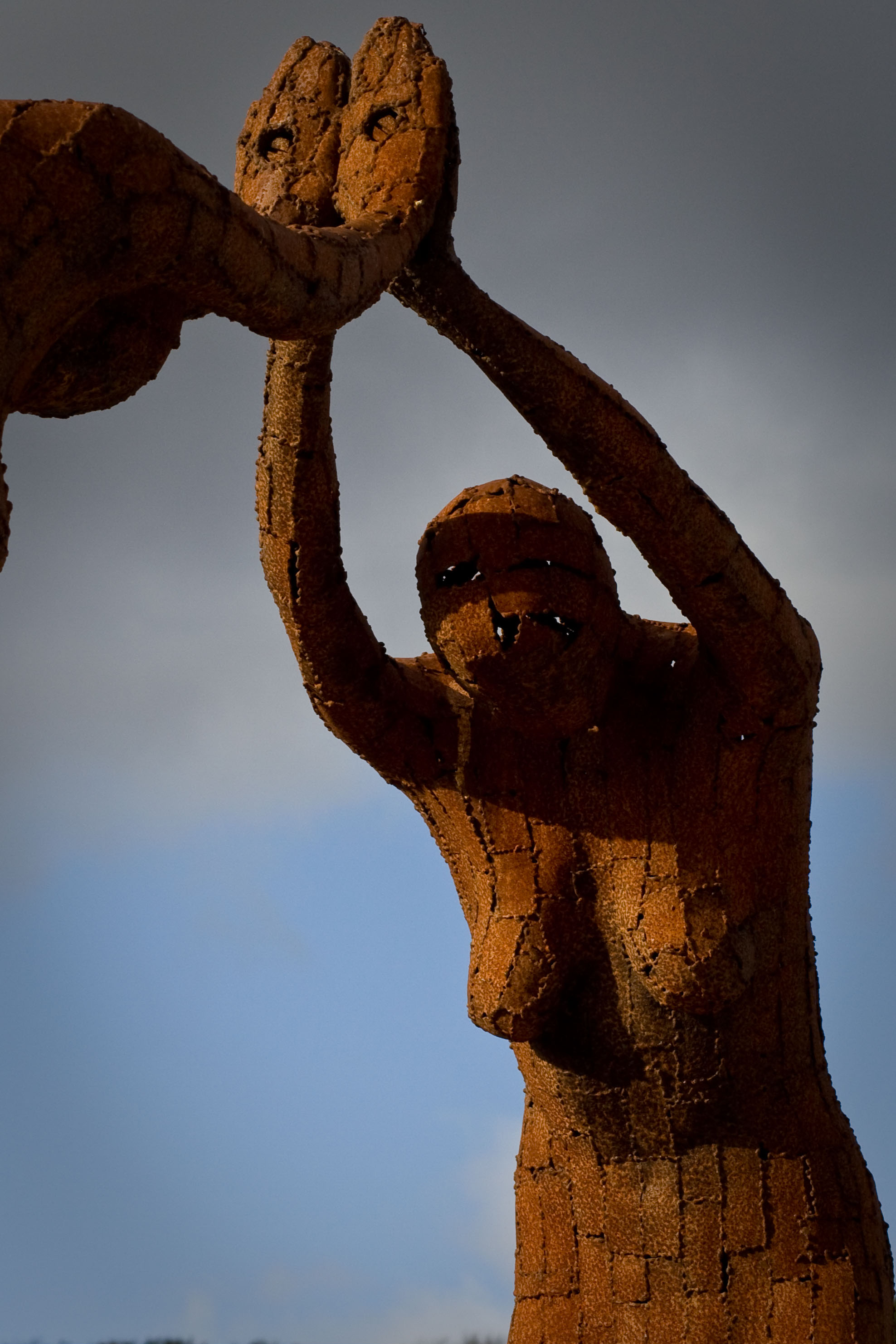
Arch by Rick Kirby, in the Ashlands development

The Bristol-based trip hop group Portishead took their name from the town, despite describing it as their "dreary home-town". Chaos UK is a punk band that was formed in Portishead in 1979. The town was also the birthplace of leading Scrumpy and Western singer Adge Cutler.

There are various groups and societies in the town, including the Gordano society that is involved in history, conservation, environment, planning and wildlife issues; a horticultural society; and the Portishead Railway Group that is campaigning for the Portishead to Bristol railway line to be re-opened. There are also church and youth organisations such as the Portishead Youth Club - a choral society, which was formed in 1955 - and an annual carnival.

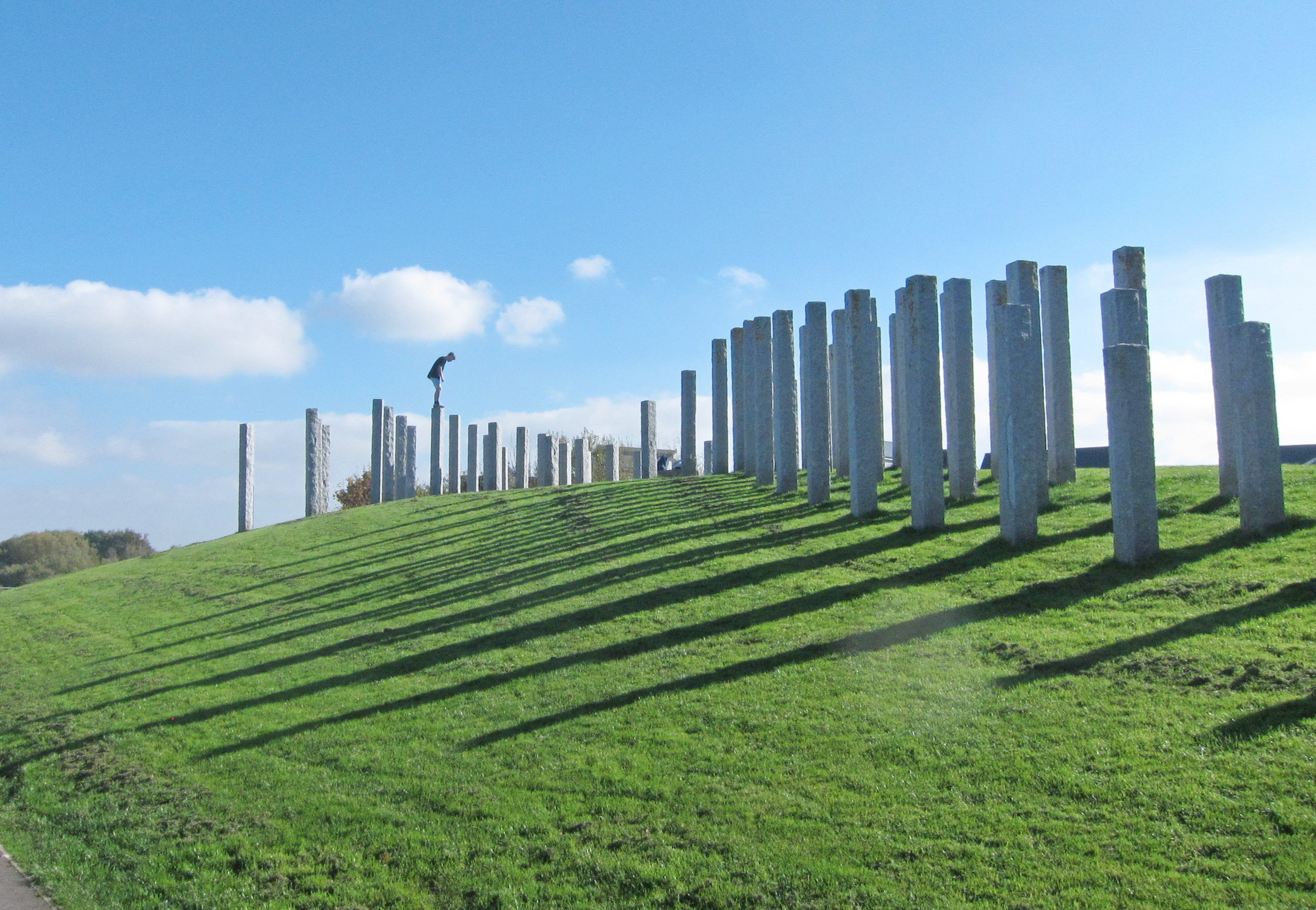
Granite sculpture by Michael Dan Archer, at Port Marine, Portishead

A public art programme started in 1999 from the marina development, as part of a planning agreement between the developers (Crest Nicholson and Persimmon Homes) and North Somerset Council. An art trail takes in 28 public art works around the marina and Ashlands development. including works by artists Jon Buck, Lucy Glendinning, Mark Merer, and Ann Christopher

== Twinned towns ==
In 1989 the town twinned with Den Dungen, a small town of approximately 6,000 inhabitants about 3 miles (4.8 km) from the city of 's-Hertogenbosch, capital of the province of North Brabant in the Netherlands. Den Dungen was a separate municipality until 1996, when it was merged with Sint-Michielsgestel.

In 1992 a further twinning arrangement was made with Schweich, the principal town in a municipality of some 20,000 people, 6 miles (9.7 km) from the Roman city of Trier. This municipality is in the Trier-Saarburg district, in Rhineland-Palatinate, Germany. It is situated on the river Moselle, about 6 miles (9.7 km) northeast of Trier. Schweich is the seat of the Verbandsgemeinde ("collective municipality") Schweich an der Römischen Weinstraße.

== Notable people ==
- George Wightwick (1802–1872), architect, died locally.
- Frederic Weatherly (1848–1929), lawyer, author, broadcaster and lyricist of Danny Boy and Roses of Picardy
- Elizabeth Rebecca Ward (1880–1978), wrote verse, religious works and works for children; pen-name Fay Inchfawn.
- Adge Cutler (1930–1974), popular singer, frontman of the comic folk band the Wurzels.
- Johnny Briggs (1935–2021), actor, lived locally.
- Eddie Large (1941–2020), comedian with Little and Large
- Chris Harris (1942–2014), pantomime dame, director and writer, lived and died locally
- Andy Rollings (born 1954) footballer, six years and 168 games with Brighton & Hove Albion.
- Carol Vorderman (born 1960), TV presenter
- Admiral Sir Tony Radakin (born 1965), naval Officer and Chief of the Defence Staff, 2021 to 2025; brought up locally.
- Geoff Barrow (born 1971), member of the band Portishead.
- Imogen Cairns (born 1989), Olympic gymnast
