= Gordano School =

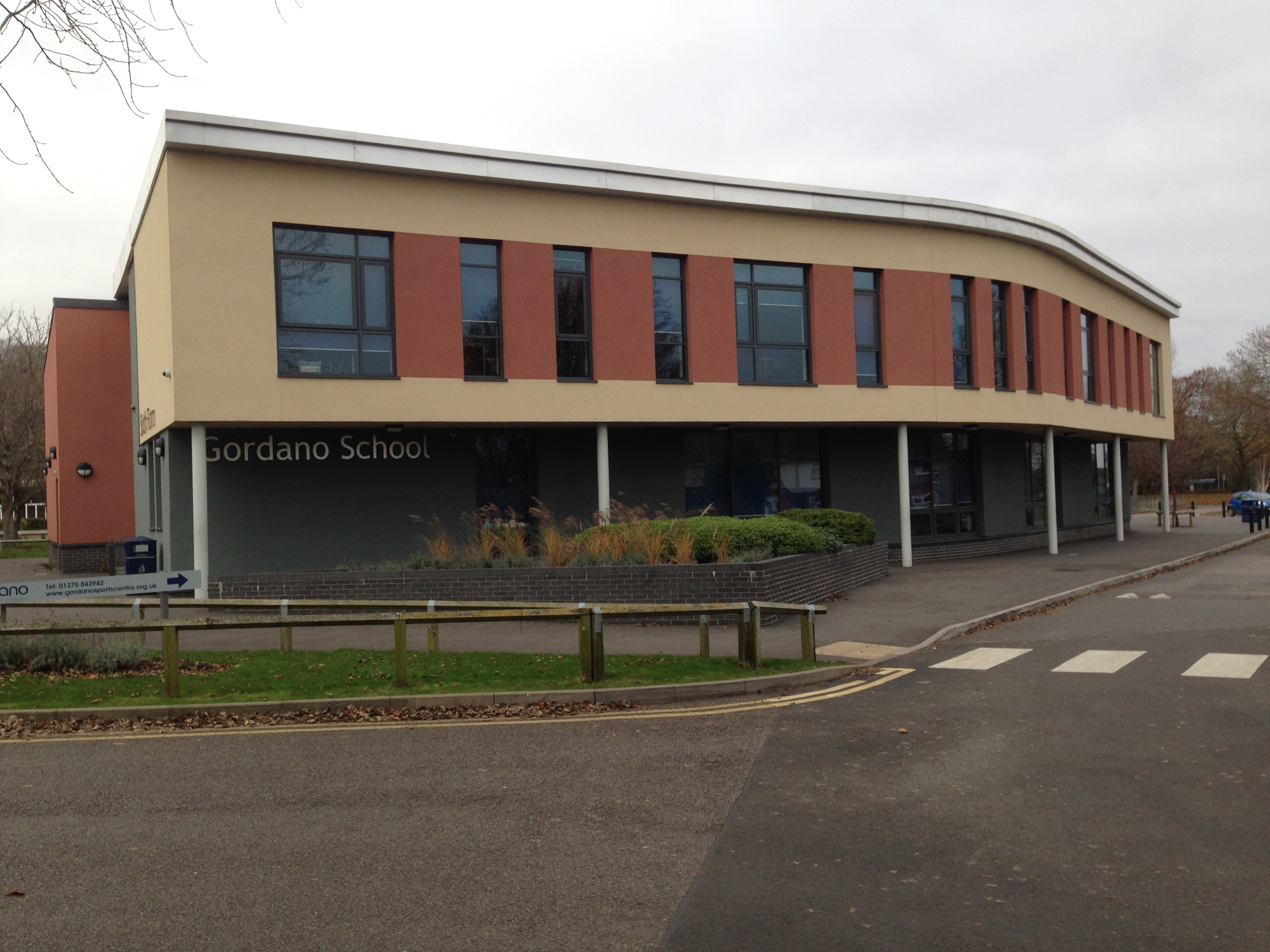

Location
- St. Mary's Road; Portishead, North Somerset, BS20 7QR; England; 51°28′31″N 2°46′12″W

Information
- Type: Academy
- Motto: Dream Big, Give Back, Do your Best
- Established: 1956
- Specialist: Technology College
- Department for Education URN: 136856 Tables
- Ofsted: Reports
- Headteacher: Louise Blundell
- Gender: Mixed
- Age: 11 to 18
- Enrolment: 2,100 pupils (as of January 2021)
- Houses: 6 Biscay, Cromarty, Fitzroy, Lundy, Portland, Shannon
- Colours: Red, Green, Orange, Purple, Yellow, Blue, plus Navy Blue for all
- Website: http://www.gordanoschool.org.uk

Gordano School (/ɡɔːrˈdeɪnoʊ/) is a comprehensive school with academy status located in Portishead, North Somerset, England. In 1999, the school was awarded Specialist schools Technology College status. Gordano School has 2,100 pupils aged 11 to 18 as of August 2024 with an Ofsted rating of good.

== History ==
The school was originally proposed in 1937, with a projected cost of £27,000. However, the project was cancelled due to the Second World War. New plans were drawn in 1952, and excavation of the site started in 1954. During excavations, the skeleton of an Iron Age man was found, who was nicknamed Septimus because he was discovered on the seventh day of the seventh month. Septimus was rumoured to have been part of former Anglo Saxon tribes and it was later discovered that he died of malaria. Roman building remains were also found in the grounds before the school opened on 17 September 1956, with 300 pupils, 18 teachers and 12 classrooms.

The official opening took place on 12 July 1957. The school had cost £146,000 and still needed work to the playing fields. By September of that year, pupil numbers had increased to 500 and councillors were demanding more classrooms. The increase was attributed to the "post-war bulge". In 1965, £209,000 was allocated for new buildings. The education department forecast the school numbers would treble by 1975. In 1994, an astroturf sports playing surface was laid at a cost of £260,000. Numbers had grown to 1,589 pupils and 88 teachers.

Since 2000 the school has undergone a £9,500,000 re-development, adding a new hall incorporating a drama room. Included in the building work was a new maths and social sciences block, music block extension, new science and technology classrooms, and a canteen extension. The Sixth Form Centre also underwent renovation. The new buildings were officially opened in December 2006. In November 2007 Gordano School became a Foundation School. Technology College status was redesignated in October 2007.

The school is also home to Gordano Valley Church as well as many local clubs and societies including the successful Portishead town band which rehearses regularly on the site.

In December 2009, it was announced that headteacher Graham Silverthorne was leaving at the end of the academic year to take up a new post in Hong Kong. Gary Lewis became the new headteacher in August 2010.

In 2017, Gary Lewis left the post to take a more senior role within The Lightouse Partnership – a Multi Academy Trust which the school is part of. He was replaced by former deputy-head Tom Inman

In 2022, Tom Inman left from his role as Headteacher. Louise Blundell was instated as Headteacher that same year.

In early 2018, work began on a new canteen building, along with new classrooms. The building opened for MFL speaking exams in July and furnishing was finished in time for the 2018–19 academic year.

== Awards ==
The school has gained the following awards:

- Training School
- Arts Mark
- Technology College
- Sport England
- Investors in People
- A Leading Edge School
- European Award for Languages
- DFE Character Award

== Houses ==
Gordano School is divided into six houses which were previously named after the house heads' surname – now each is named after shipping areas around the UK:

- Lundy (Formerly Berridge)
- Fitzroy (Formerly Smith)
- Portland (Formerly Prevett)
- Cromarty (Formerly Mckay)
- Shannon (Formerly Stanley)
- Biscay (Formerly Offer)

When the school first opened in 1956 there were four houses named: Avon, Bristol, Cadbury and Denny.

== Notable alumni ==
- Geoff Barrow – Founder of the band Portishead.
