= Black Nore Lighthouse =

Lighthouse in Somerset, England

Blacknore Point Lighthouse
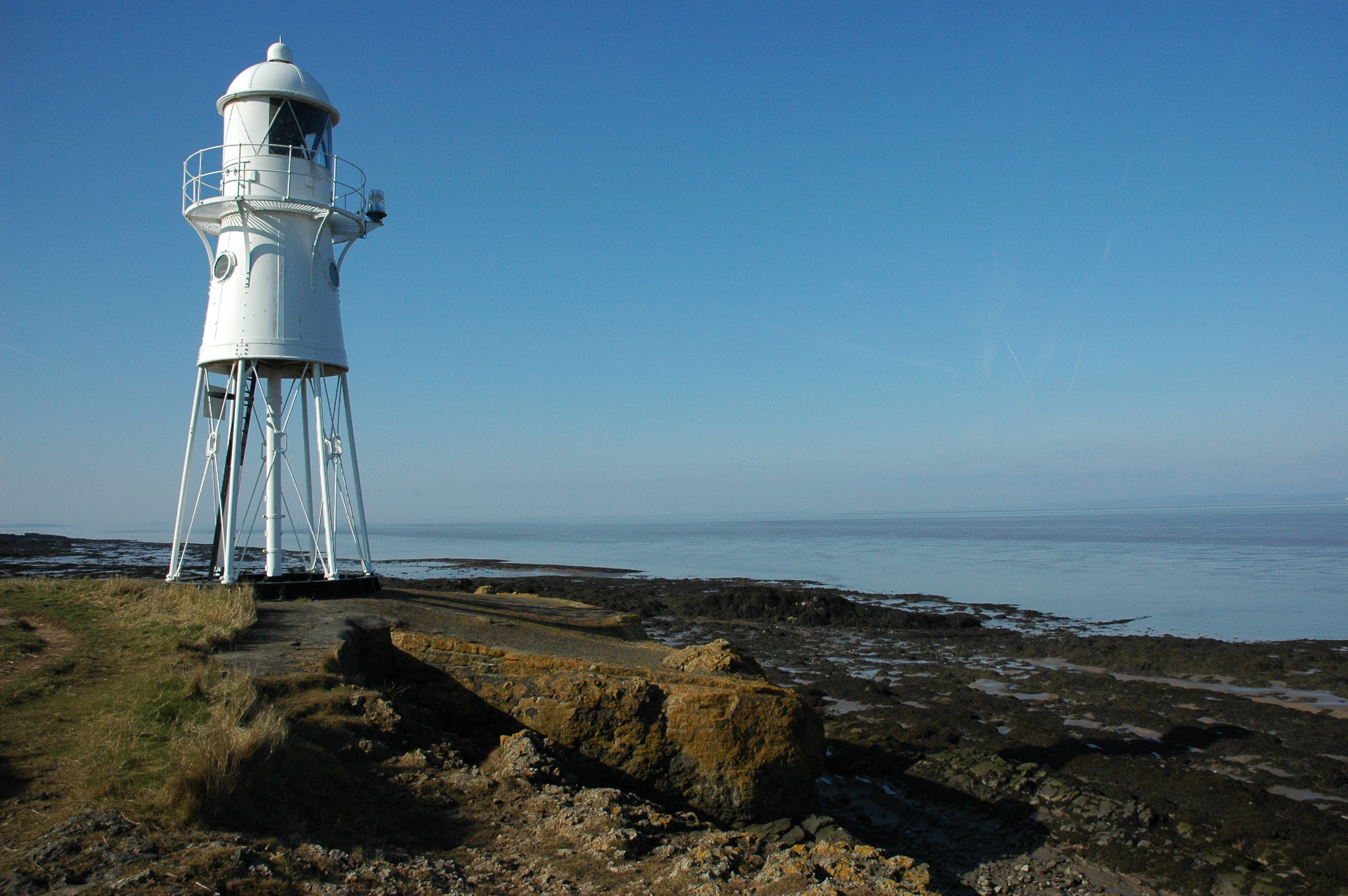
- The lighthouse in 2010
- Location: Portishead; Somerset; England
- OS grid: ST4450376499
- Coordinates: 51°29′05″N 2°48′02″W

Tower
- Constructed: 1894
- Construction: cast iron skeletal tower
- Automated: 1941
- Height: 11 metres (36 ft)
- Shape: tapered cylindrical skeletal tower with observation room, balcony and lantern
- Markings: white tower and lantern
- Operator: Trinity House (–2010)
- Heritage: Grade II listed building

Light
- Deactivated: 2010
- Lens: fourth-order 250 mm biform
- Range: 15 nautical miles (28 km; 17 mi)
- Characteristic: Fl (2) W 10 s.

Black Nore Lighthouse is a grade II listed building in Portishead, Somerset, England. The cast iron white-painted lighthouse was built in 1894 by Trinity House to guide shipping in the Severn Estuary as it made its way in and out of Bristol Harbour. It sits on a small outcrop where the estuary opens out into the Bristol Channel. Before its light was decommissioned, the lens array (a rotating fourth-order 250 mm biform optic) flashed twice every ten seconds.

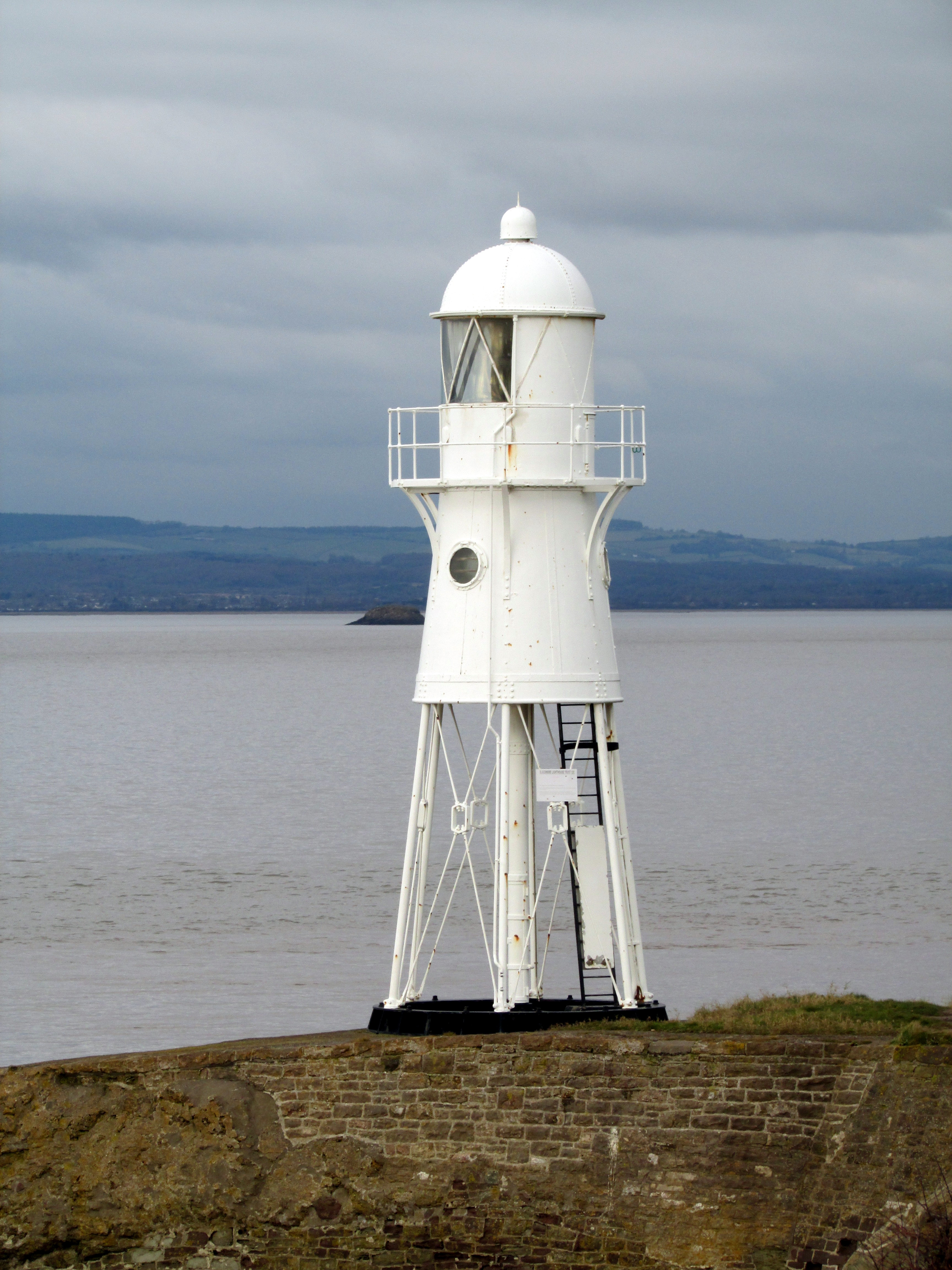
Black Nore Lighthouse, February 2015

The waters off Black Nore have one of the largest tidal ranges in the world, reaching about 14.8 metres (49 ft) at nearby Avonmouth. This produces fast tidal streams and short windows for safe navigation. Approaches are marked by shifting sandbanks, such as the Welsh Hook and the English and Welsh Grounds, where depths and channels change continuously as the seabed moves.

== History ==
The light was first operated on 19 April 1894. In December 1900, the steamship Brunswick grounded on a sandbank known as the Welsh Hook, between Black Nore and the English and Welsh Grounds Lightship, while en route from Liverpool to Bristol. The vessel later capsized and sank, and over a century later its wreck was positively identified through hydrographic surveys carried out by the Bristol Port Company.

Until World War II the lighthouse was lit by gas, supplied from the gas main and stored in tanks nearby. To begin with it displayed a light which was cut off twice in quick succession every twenty seconds, and had a range of 11 nautical miles (20 km; 13 mi). The rotating optic was installed in 1908 and flashed twice every ten seconds. Its drive mechanism was wound up daily by the Ashford family until 1941 when the light was converted to automatic operation. In 2000, the winding and drive mechanisms were replaced by electric motors.

== Decommissioning and preservation ==
After it became unneeded for navigational purposes, the lighthouse was decommissioned on 27 September 2010. The building was set for demolition, but was granted grade II listed status on 24 June 2011 by English Heritage (now Historic England), recognising its historical and architectural significance.

The lighthouse was sold for a nominal fee of £1 in October 2011 to the newly-founded Blacknore Lighthouse Trust Community Interest Company (CIC). This was incorporated in May 2011 "to preserve and maintain Blacknore Lighthouse for as long as it is practical to do so as a landmark".

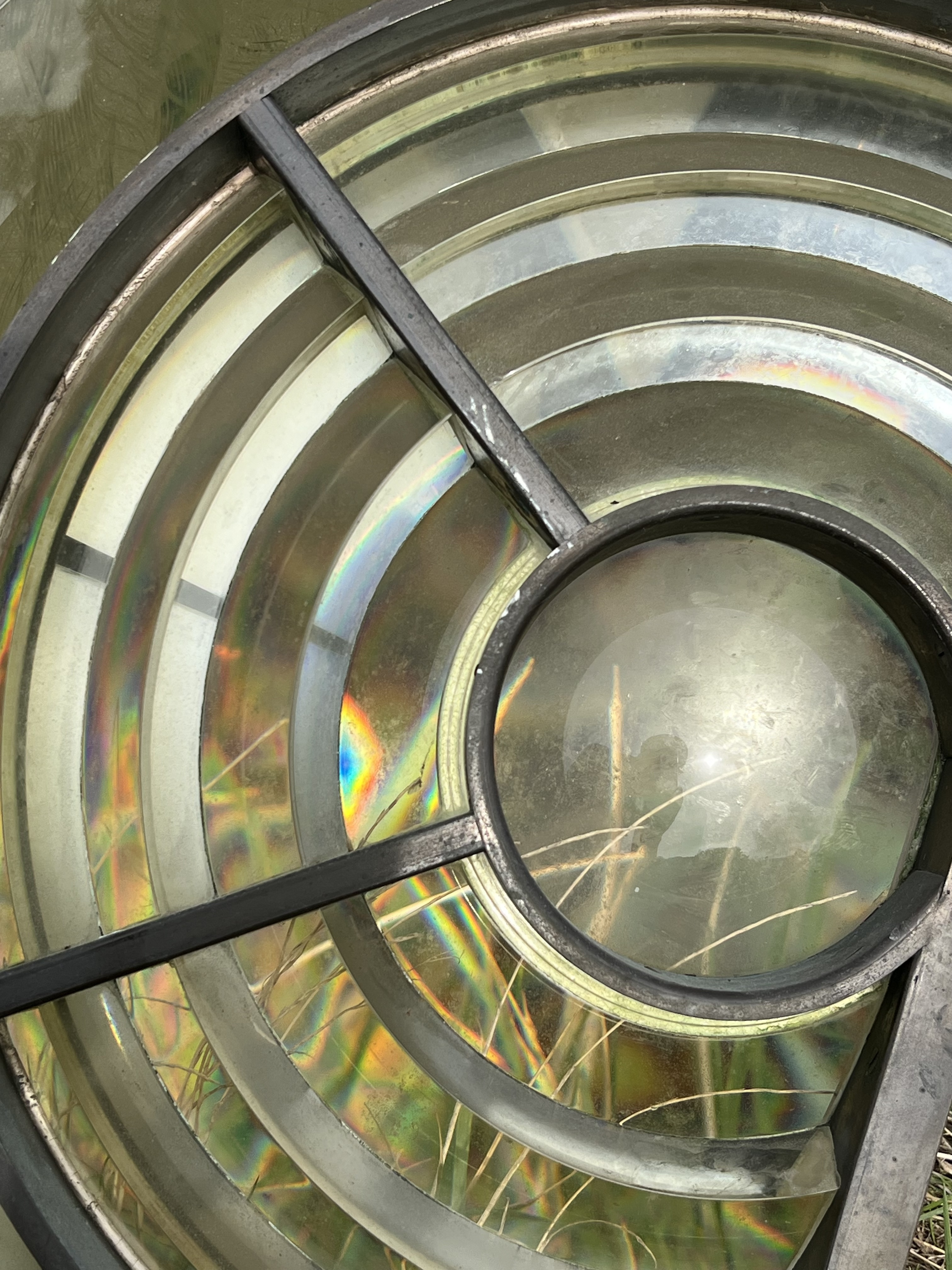
One of eight Fresnel lenses making up the optic

The official handover took place the following January, and later that year the optic was returned to the lighthouse on a ten-year loan from Trinity House. An initial small grant from the local council boosted contributions from a number of local residents. As well as insuring the building, Blacknore Lighthouse Trust CIC managed the maintenance of the building's exterior as well as it could between 2011 and 2022.

In 2025, Companies House gave notice for compulsory strike-off of the CIC. The CIC's accounts for the year ending 31 May 2023 reported assets of £856 and liabilities of £9,770, indicating that the company was operating an £8,920 deficit. Once complete, the strike-off process breaks the asset lock and the property then becomes 'bona vacantia' ('unowned property') and reverts to the Crown. A local newspaper reported in October 2025 that its future ownership is uncertain.

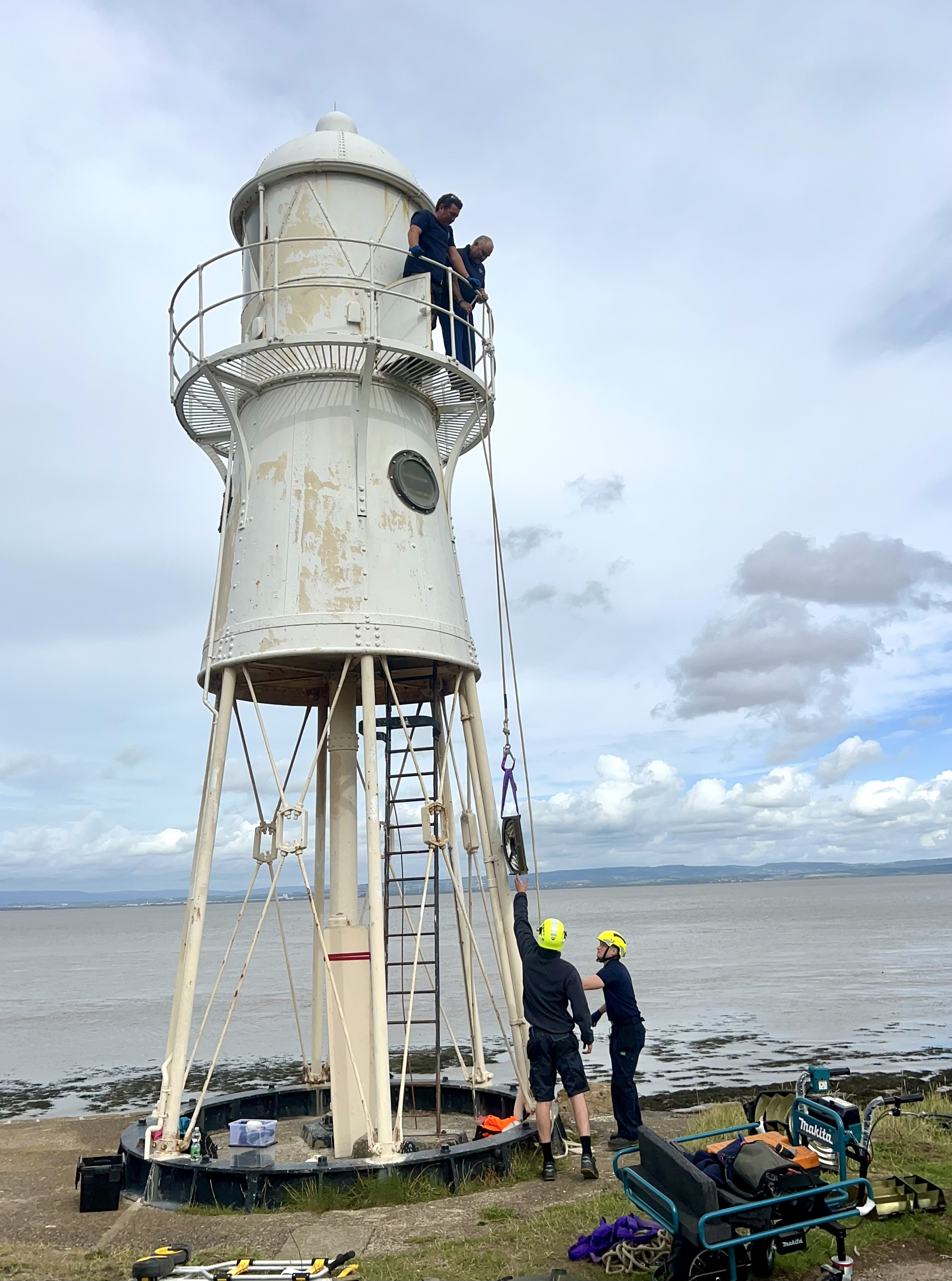
Trinity House taking back the optic they had loaned to Black Nore Lighthouse

On 9 September 2025, Trinity House dismantled the optic which had been on loan since 2011. Using a side-hatch above the gallery facing inland, they removed the eight Fresnel lens components mounted on brass as well as the bronze gear wheel which was originally used to rotate the optic via a pinion when the light was flashing.

== See also ==
- List of lighthouses in England
