= Clapton Moor =

Nature reserve in Somerset, England

Clapton Moor Nature Reserve
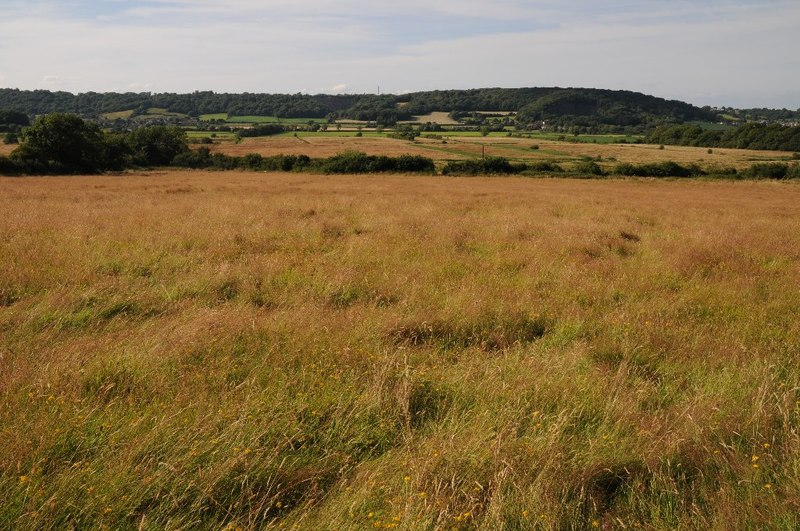
- Clapton Moor during summer

- Location within North Somerset
- Interactive map of Clapton Moor Nature Reserve
- Type: Nature Reserve
- Location: North Somerset
- Nearest town: Weston-in-Gordano
- OS grid: ST 458 735
- Coordinates: 51°27′27″N 02°46′48″W
- Area: 40 ha (99 acres)
- Manager: Avon Wildlife Trust
- Paths: The Clapton Circuit
- Designation: Site of Nature Conservation Interest
- Website: Avon Wildlife Trust

Clapton Moor is a 40-hectare (99-acre) Avon Wildlife Trust nature reserve and part of the Gordano Valley, Clapton Moor, Middle Bridge and rhynes Site of Nature Conservation Interest in Somerset, England.

Clapton Moor is located in the Gordano Valley region of North Somerset. Precisely, north of Clevedon lane, in between the villages of Weston-in-Gordano and Clapton-in-Gordano. The nature reserve lies within the borders of the Clapton-in-Gordano civil parish.

Access to the reserve is restricted for non-permit holders, but a public footpath passes through the reserve from Clapton Drove to Clevedon lane. There is a path which leads to a bird hide in the south of the reserve, and a bridge across a large rhyne near the eastern boundary.

== Name ==
Clapton Moor is almost certainly named after the village and civil parish of Clapton-in-Gordano, which was mentioned in the Domesday book as Clotune, and later became known as Clopton, from Old English clopp (hill) and -tūn (town).

"Moor" in Somerset dialect refers to clayey or peaty, usually waterlogged, low-lying expanses of land drained by many ditches, usually named after a nearby settlement, rather than the standard English definition of acidic heathered open highlands. Examples of other nearby moors in Somerset named like this include Weston Moor, Nailsea Moor, Kenn Moor, Puxton Moor, and Congresbury Moor.

== Geography ==
Clapton Moor consists of flat, peaty, low-lying fields of wet meadows with hedgerows and ditches throughout. The south-east of the moor consists of fields of rough and wet grassland which is often grazed by cattle. The grassland of the moor is kept wet by several rhynes, some of which are deep and steep, some of the rhynes are filled with dense reed beds. There is tall grassland along the boundaries of the southern fields. A large rhyne runs along the northern boundary of the reserve.

Sluices and culverts in the rhynes are used to artificially change water levels to provide attractive conditions for various species, a high water table is maintained during summer, and the moor is intentionally flooded during winter to attract wildfowl and waders.

== Geology ==
The bedrock geology of Clapton Moor consists of sedimentary mudstone and Halitestone belonging to the Mercia Mudstone Group formed during the Triassic period.

Clapton moor is covered with extensive superficial alluvial deposits which extend towards Avonmouth.

The Gordano Valley (including Clapton Moor) may have historically been an estuary of the River Severn.

== History ==
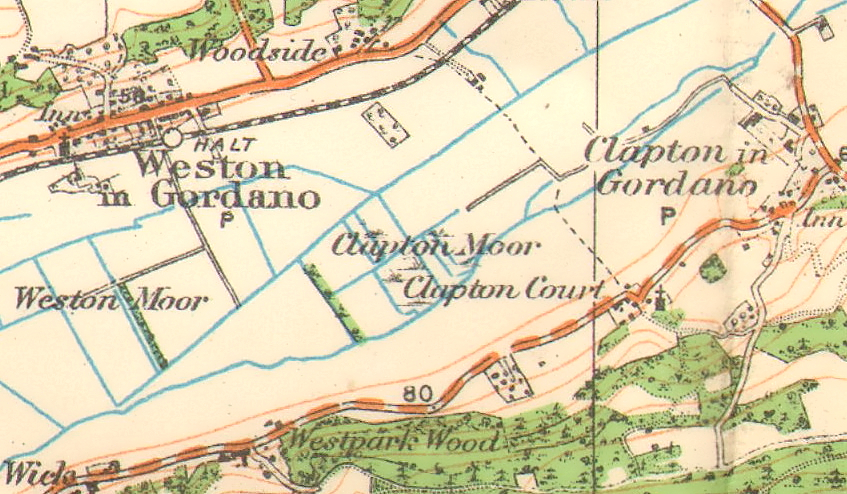
Detail of Ordnance Survey sheet 110, published in 1919, showing Clapton Moor and surrounding features

Although Clapton Moor is located near ancient sites like Cadbury Camp, and Clapton-in-Gordano (in which a hoard of Roman coins dated 253-270 AD were discovered), the moor itself was of very low importance, being unmentioned in literature up until the 18th century.

In the 1700s, trapping of wildfowl took place at Clapton Moor, indicated by a duck decoy constructed in the northern part of the moor.

=== Avon Wildlife Trust management ===
The land making up the nature reserve was purchased in the late 1990s by the Avon Wildlife Trust, with funding and support from various trusts, charities, and donations from the general public.

In 1998, a planning application to dredge the rhynes and to construct the sluices and culverts in the reserve was accepted by the North Somerset Council.

At around 2000, a bird hide was erected at Clapton Moor.

==== Biodiversity Action Plan for the Greater Water Parsnip ====
In 2003, in partnership with Bristol Zoo Gardens, the Avon Wildlife Trust launched a conservation project to re-introduce the nationally scarce greater water parsnip to Clapton Moor, its former stronghold, via planting manually pollinated seeds acquired from other native water parsnip populations across England.

The initial project which took place in 2003 was unsuccessful, failing to re-introduce the water parsnip to Clapton Moor, with the seeds taken from Southlake Moor failing to germinate.

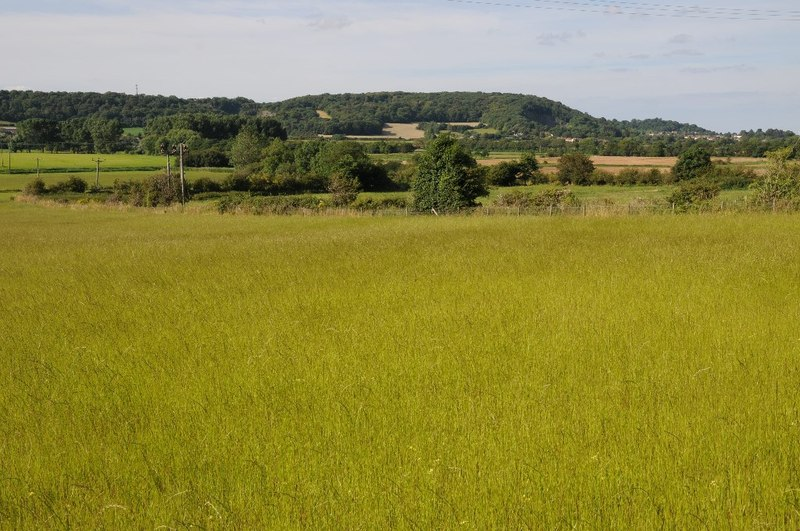
Clapton Moor during summer, pictured from Clevedon Lane

In 2005, with cooperation from the Norfolk Greater Water Parsnips Biodiversity Action Plan team, the Bristol Zoo horticulture team managed to germinate seeds which were collected from Cantley Marsh. In 2006, 60 greater water parsnip seeds were prepared for re-introduction to Clapton Moor.

"The reasons for the rapid population decline and failure to produce seed are not clear. It might be changes in weather, in rhyne management, or modern agricultural practices reducing the number of insect pollinators." -Tim McGrath, Head of Nature Reserves of the AWT

It is not clear whether the Greater Water Parsnip has been successfully reintroduced to Clapton Moor.

==== Conflict of interest with the Avon Model Aero Radio Club (AMARC) ====
On 25 January 2005, The Avon Model Aero Radio Club (AMARC) made a planning application to the North Somerset Council to create a site for flying model aircraft on the territory of a former dumping ground off Weston Drove (51.459264°N 2.791017°W), 160 metres (520 ft) from the Clapton Moor Nature Reserve. The club intended to convert a footpath to a road which would lead to a car park with a capacity of 25 vehicles, and to perform landscaping for a garage and 2 "mobile structures". The application was withdrawn by the club on 20 April 2005.

After the withdrawal of the original application, a new one was made on the 1st of December 2005, the club planned to station 2 caravans, one for facilities and the other for storage, as well as a garage for the secure storage of equipment.

On 17 May 2006, the Weston Mercury published an article reporting that the Avon Wildlife Trust had strongly objected to AMARC's plans, claiming that the model aircraft, with their resemblance to birds of prey would disturb nesting birds and frighten others away from the area.

The Weston Mercury writes that the Avon Model Aero Radio Club, which had already been using the site for 3 years prior, replied saying that the club only flies model aircraft within the boundaries of their own site, and not over the nature reserve. Stating that the club also said that they would be happy with one year of planning permission, and for a study to be carried out to see if there would be an impact on wading birds. Weston Mercury also states that North Somerset Council planning officers recommended a one-year planning consent to be agreed under certain conditions, such as not allowing more than 4 aircraft to fly at one time, and for restrictions on the weight and wingspan of the aircraft.

On 13 April 2006, the North Area Committee deferred the planning application for a meeting to take on the 27th between the neighbours, parish council, Avon Wildlife Trust, and the club applicant. The exact outcome or evidence of the meeting taking place is not clear.

On 18 May 2006, the North Somerset Council approved the club's planning application with the condition that if an independent investigation which had already been submitted by the council, were to conclude that the club's operations would in fact disturb wildlife, that the site would be returned to its previous condition.

As of January 2024, AMARC continues to use the site off Weston Drove, with strict conditions concerning the nearby wildlife at the Clapton and Weston Moors. Satellite imagery from May 2023 show various structures and facilities present on the site.

==== North Somerset Levels and Moors Restoration Project ====
In April 2018, with funding from a Biffa Award grant, the AWT started a project to begin work on Clapton moor and Weston moor to restore wetland habitat for Lapwing, the population of which had decreased by ~90% in the area. The project would in-turn also create habitat for other wildlife.

“Where once we’d see and hear the unique call of lapwings above us in this landscape, these wading birds are now rarely seen. We’re now working hard on our Weston Moor and Clapton Moor nature reserves to create the habitat that will not only bring them back, but will also benefit other plants and wildlife which flourish in wetland areas.” - Eric Heath, AWT Head of Land Management.

the work included: cooperation with a local farmer to manage grass height, digging of shallow dips in the grassland to provide a place for lapwings to nest, hedge-laying, removal of trees to increase visibility of the landscape and to reduce perching sites for potential predators.

== Flora and fauna ==
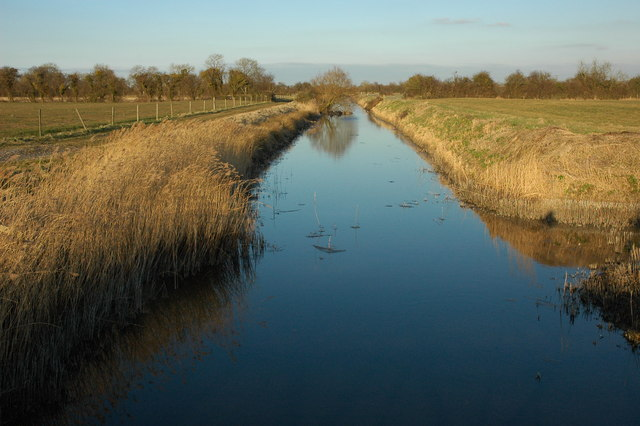
A rhyne running through the reserve

The several rhynes which run through the site serve as an important habitat for many species of bird, such as wintering wildfowl and breeding waders. northern lapwing, common redshank, and common snipe arrive to the reserve during spring and summer to breed.

Rare plant species can be found growing in the rhynes, such as Hydrocharis morsus-ranae, Ranunculus lingua, and Potamogeton coloratus.

Buzzard, peregrine and hobby have been observed at the reserve, often seen chasing Swallows and Swift that also live off the moor. Barn Owls have been observed on the site as well, hunting small rodents in the tall grass near the southern boundary of the reserve.

Clapton Moor is also noted for its dragonflies, such as the Sympetrum sanguineum, and Brachytron pratense species.

== The Clapton Circuit ==
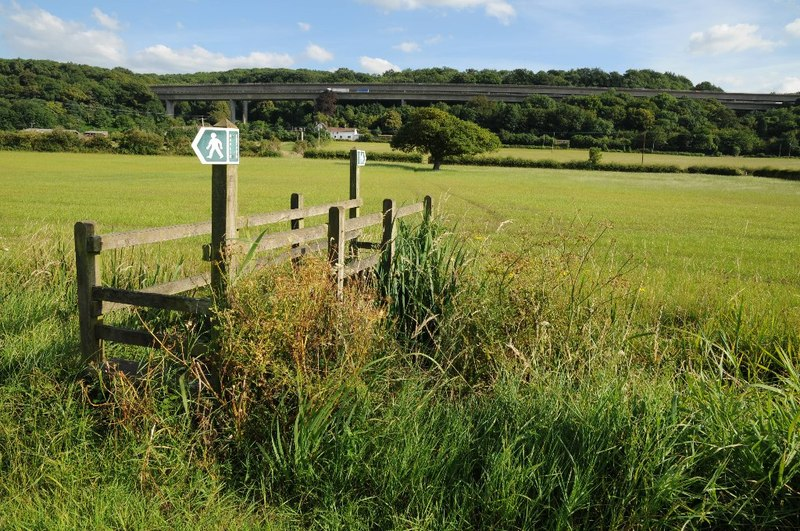
A public footbridge constructed across a rhyne at Clapton Moor

The Clapton Circuit, created by the Avon Wildlife Trust, is a 3.4-mile (5.5 km) recreational circular walk offering panoramic views and passing various points of interest in and around Clapton-in-Gordano. Starting and ending at the Black Horse Pub in the village, the walk features Clapton Moor as it runs along the eastern boundary of the nature reserve and past a path leading to a bird hide overlooking the moor.

The route is maintained by volunteers of the Gordano Valley Conservation Group wing of the Avon Wildlife trust, and is supported by YANSEC and the North Somerset Council.

== See also ==
- List of Avon Wildlife Trust nature reserves
- List of Wildlife Trust nature reserves
- Gordano Valley
