= Weston-in-Gordano SSSI =

Geological site in North Somerset, England

Weston-in-Gordano
- Site of Special Scientific Interest
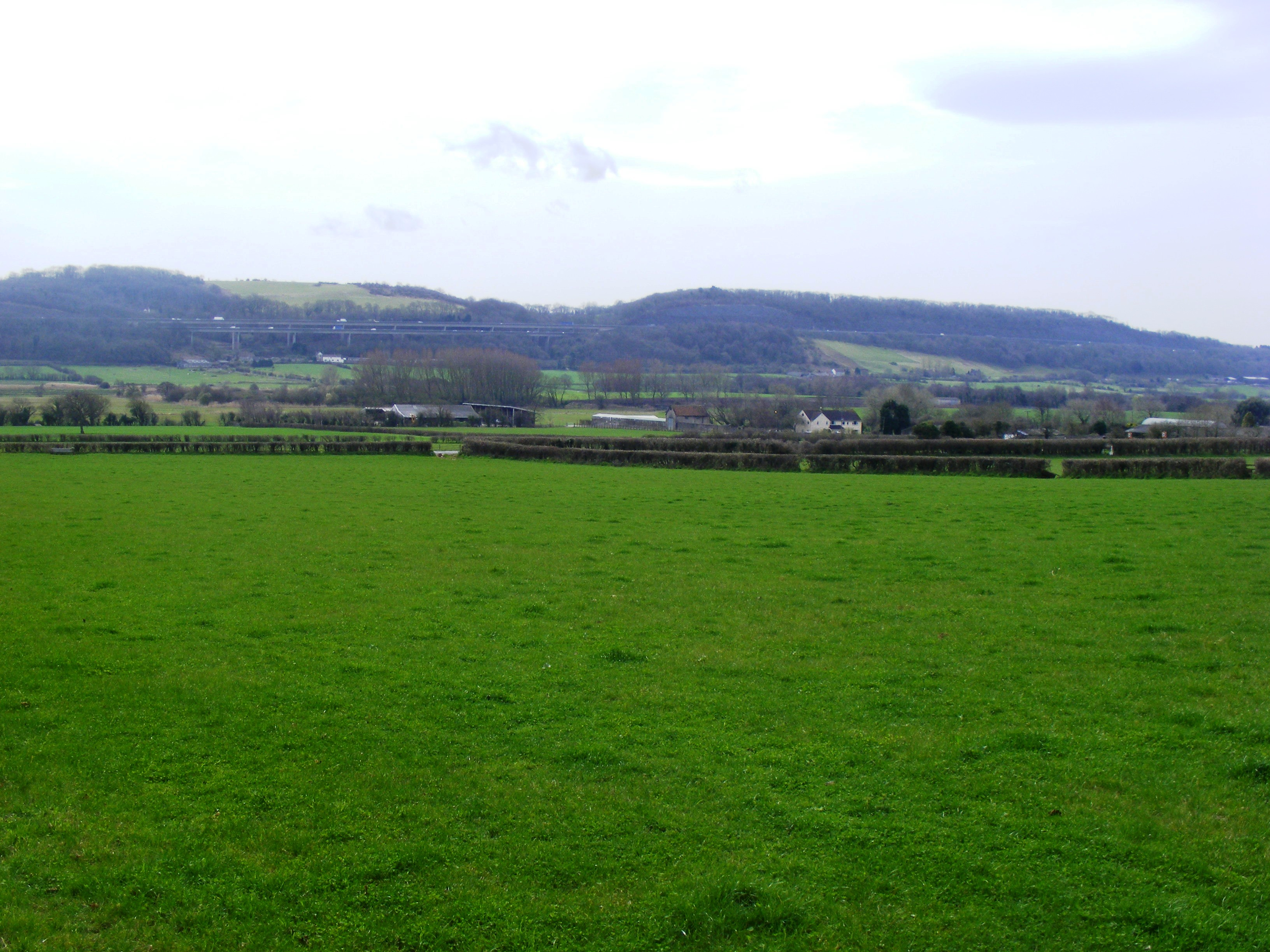

- Location within Somerset
- Location of Weston-in-Gordano.
- Area of search: Avon
- Grid reference: ST452744
- Coordinates: 51.46590°N 2.79027°W
- Interest: Geological
- Area: 12.55 hectares (0.1255 km^{2}; 0.0485 sq mi)
- Notification date: 1993

Weston-in-Gordano SSSI (grid reference ST452744) is a 12.55 hectare geological Site of Special Scientific Interest near the village of Weston in Gordano, North Somerset, notified in 1993.

Note that there is also a separate biological and geological SSSI covering the Gordano Valley.

This is a Geological Conservation Review site because temporary exposures here have shown Pleistocene sediments, including interglacial fluvial sands and marine gravels and cold-stage fluvial gravels. Rich molluscan faunas have been reported from the section. The presence of freshwater and marine interglacial deposits gives it great potential importance for the understanding of the Quaternary sequence of the Vale of Gordano and Avonmouth lowlands.
