= Portbury Ashlands =

Nature Reserve in Somerset

Coordinates: 51°29′24″N 2°44′44″W

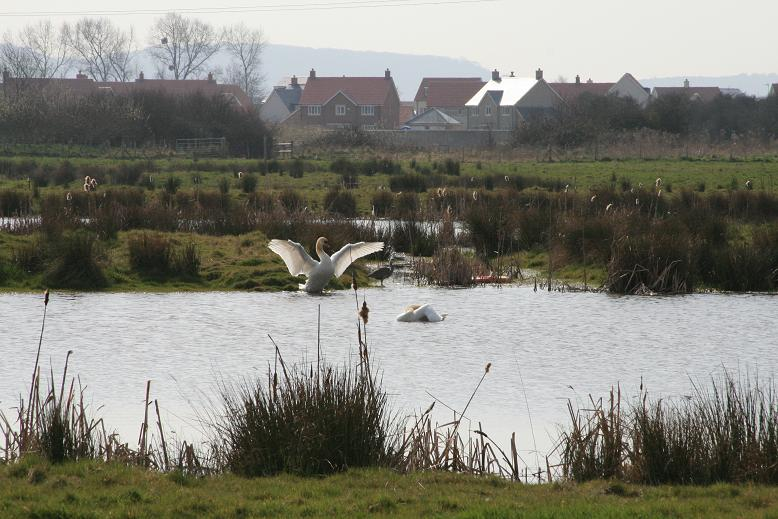
One of the ponds

Portbury Ashlands which is now known as Portbury Wharf Nature Reserve is a nature reserve between Portishead and the Royal Portbury Dock in Somerset, England. It was formed from the redevelopment of the area of Portishead formerly occupied by two power stations. To the east of the harbour, an area known as "the Ashlands" was used for over 50 years to get rid of power station waste which was dumped into lagoons on the site.

The Portishead power stations were coal-fed electric power stations. Construction work started on Portishead "A" power station in 1926. It began generating electricity in 1929 for the Bristol Corporation's Electricity Department. Construction of Portishead "B" power station began in 1949; it became operational in 1955. The stations used some local coal produced in the Somerset coalfield, which was delivered by train along the Portishead branch of the Great Western Railway (GWR). The main supply of coal was brought from South Wales, from Newport and Ely, Cardiff by boat into the dock; it was carried by Osborn & Wallis of Bristol.

Avon Wildlife Trust have taken over management of the area, which covers around 100 acres (40 ha), from the developers Persimmon plc. It was implemented as ecological mitigation for the housing development and included the introduction of a public access network. In 2015 the North Somerset council decided to take over management of the reserve and that residents of the housing development would no longer need to pay the £50 per annum levy for the upkeep. Some local residents are worried that the council does not have the expertise required to take over from the wildlife trust and for the longer term implications for the site.

The site includes two large pools, several ponds, rhynes, grazing marsh, hay meadows and hedgerows. It provides a habitat for a wide range of plants and animals. Great crested newts (Triturus cristatus), water voles (Arvicola amphibius), grass snakes (Natrix natrix) and brown hares (Lepus europaeus) have been seen and there is evidence that otters (Lutra lutra) are moving in. A wide variety of birds are making their homes on the site, including barn owls (Tyto alba), and it is visited by large number of migratory birds which use the Severn Estuary on their journeys. These include: curlew (Numenius arquatus), dunlin (Calidris alpina), redshank (Tringa totanus) and shelduck (Tadorna tadorna). The tidal range results in the estuary having one of the most extensive intertidal wildlife habitats in the UK, comprising mudflats, sandflats, rocky platforms and islands. These form a basis for plant and animal communities typical of extreme physical conditions of liquid mud and tide-swept sand and rock. The estuary is recognised as a wetland area of international importance and is designated as a Ramsar site. Parts of the estuary have also been designated a Site of Special Scientific Interest. The SSSI includes most of the foreshore upstream from Cardiff and Brean Down and most of the upper estuary as far as Sharpness. The Ashlands also provides a green link between the estuary and the Gordano Valley which has been designated as a national nature reserve.
