= Biddle Street, Yatton =

Protected area in Somerset, England

- Site of Special Scientific Interest
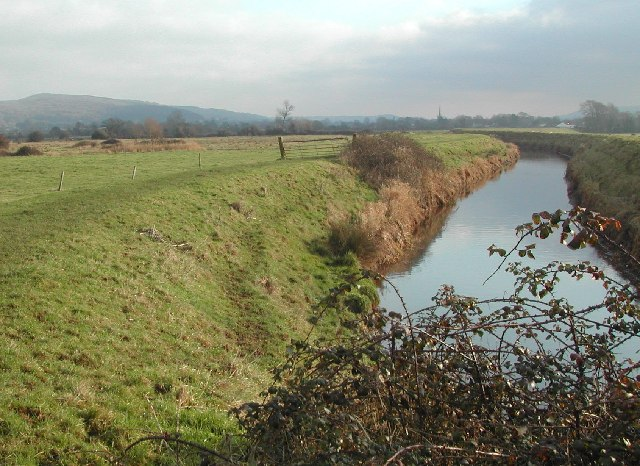

- Location within Somerset
- Location of Biddle Street, Yatton.
- Area of search: Avon
- Grid reference: ST423648
- Coordinates: 51.37930°N 2.83044°W
- Interest: Biological
- Area: 110.7 acres (0.448 km^{2}; 0.1730 sq mi)
- Notification date: 1994

Biddle Street, Yatton (grid reference ST423648) is a 44.8 hectare biological Site of Special Scientific Interest (SSSI) near the village of Yatton in North Somerset, notified in 1994.

Management practices and the variation in the soils has resulted in the watercourses supporting a wide range of aquatic plant communities. Where open water occurs plants such as Common Water-starwort (Callitriche stagnalis), European Frogbit (Hydrocharis morsusranae), Fan-leaved water-crowfoot (Ranunculus circinatus). The calcareous influence of the underlying Compton soils also encourages Whorled Water-milfoil (Myriophyllum verticillatum) and Stonewort (Chara sp). Also present are the nationally scarce Rootless Duckweed (Wolffia arrhiza) and Hairlike Pondweed (Potamogeton trichoides).

A rich invertebrate fauna is also associated with the rhynes and ditches including aquatic beetles including populations of two nationally rare species, Hydacticus transversalis and Britain's largest water beetle, the Great Silver Water Beetle (Hydrophilus piceus). A number of dragonflies and damselflies are also found in the watercourses including the nationally scarce Variable Damselfly (Coenagrion pulchellum). Strong populations of the Common Freshwater Mussel occur as does the nationally rare Pea Mussel (Pisidium pseudosphaerium).

== See also ==
- Puxton Moor and Tickenham, Nailsea and Kenn Moors, two other similar SSSIs on the North Somerset Levels.
