= Church of St Peter and St Paul, Weston in Gordano =

Church in Somerset, England

Church of SS Peter & Paul
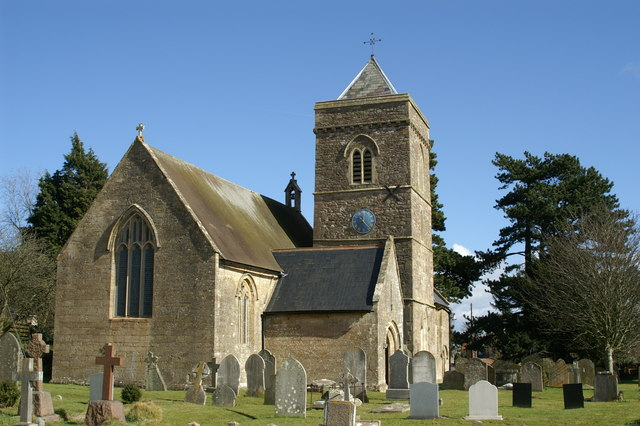

- Location within Somerset

General information
- Location: Weston in Gordano, England
- Coordinates: 51.4642°N 2.8020°W
- Completed: 15th century

The Anglican Church of SS Peter & Paul, Weston in Gordano, Somerset, England, has been designated as a Grade I listed building.

The tower and porch were built around 1300, while the rest of the building is from the 15th century, with the work being funded by Sir Richard Percivale who died in 1483 and whose tomb is in the north isle of the nave.

It has a four-bay nave, chancel and south chapel. The four stage tower is at the southern end of the church.

The interior of the church includes the original Norman font and a stone pulpit from the 13th century, there is also a Jacobean pulpit on the north side. The misericords date back to the 14th century, although some suggest they may be from the 12th and transferred from Portbury Priory.

The parish is part of the benefice of East Clevedon with Clapton in Gordano, Walton Clevedon, Walton in Gordano and Weston in Gordano within the Portishead deanery.

== See also ==
- Grade I listed buildings in North Somerset
- List of Somerset towers
- List of ecclesiastical parishes in the Diocese of Bath and Wells
