= Gordano Valley =

Nature reserve in Somerset, England

- Site of Special Scientific Interest
- Location within Somerset
- Location of Gordano Valley.
- Area of search: Avon
- Grid reference: ST435730
- Coordinates: 51.45315°N 2.81451°W
- Interest: Geological and Biological
- Area: 161.68 hectares (399.5 acres)
- Notification date: 1971

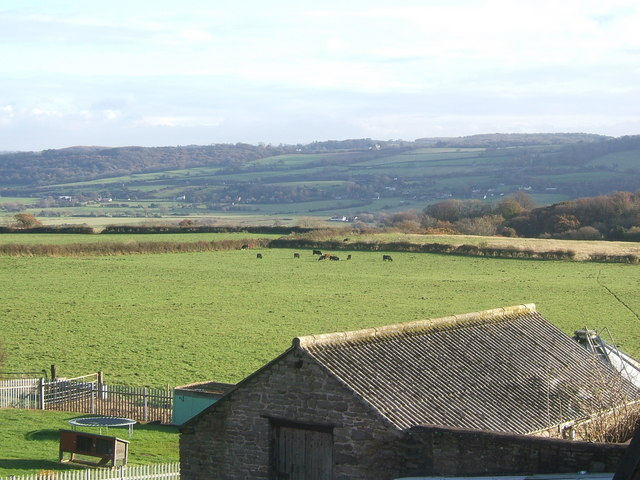
Gordano Valley from Hill Top.

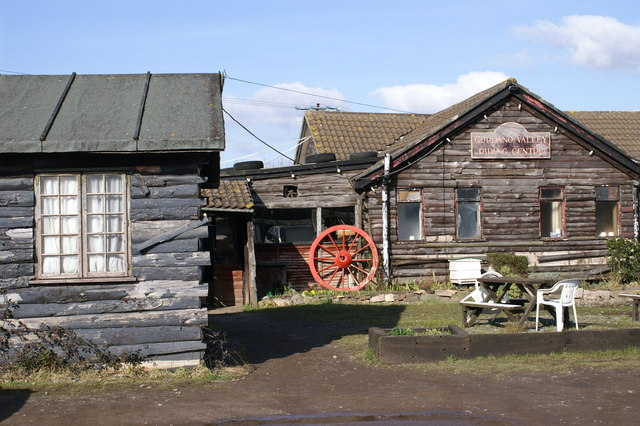
Gordano Valley Riding Centre.

Gordano (or the Gordano Valley; /ɡɔːrˈdeɪnoʊ/) is an area of North Somerset, in England. It has been designated as a National Nature Reserve.

The name Gordano comes from Old English and is descriptive of the triangular shape of the whole valley from Clevedon to Portishead, being the ablative singular of the Latinised form of Gorden meaning muddy valley.

The valley runs roughly north-east to south-west, between Carboniferous limestone ridges extending along the coastline between Clevedon and Portishead, and another ridge extending between Clevedon and Easton in Gordano. The area includes the villages of Clapton in Gordano, Weston in Gordano, Easton in Gordano, Walton in Gordano, Portbury and Sheepway. The M5 motorway runs along the south side of the valley, splitting briefly into two levels - the south-west-bound level running above the north-east-bound carriageway. The Gordano motorway service station is at the eastern end of the valley, near the Royal Portbury Dock and the Avonmouth Bridge. There is no river Gordano - much of the valley is reclaimed land barely above sea level, and it is drained by ditches (known in the area as "rhynes"). The rhynes previously managed by the now amalgamated Gordano Valley Internal Drainage Board are now the responsibility of the North Somerset Internal Drainage Board.

An area comprising a total of 161.68 hectares (399.5 acres) has been designated as a biological and geological Site of Special Scientific Interest, for ornithological, entomological and stratigraphic interest, notification originally having taken place in 1971. Several sites in the valley are managed by the Avon Wildlife Trust as nature reserves. These include; Weston Big Wood, Clapton Moor, Weston Moor and Walton Common.

The unimproved wet-meadow communities largely consist of variants of the nationally rare Blunt-flowered Rush–Marsh Thistle (Juncus subnodulosus–Cirsium palustre), Soft/Sharp Flowered Rush–Marsh Bedstraw (Juncus effusus/acutiflorus–Galium palustre), Purple Moorgrass–Meadow Thistle (Molinia caerulea–Cirsium dissectum) and Crested Dog’s-tail–Common Knapweed )Cynosurus cristatus–Centaurea nigra) community types. In total over 130 species of flowering plant have been recorded including 3 species of orchids, 21 grasses and 14 sedges. The extensive system of rhynes and field ditches contains a rich flora which includes three nationally scarce species: Water Parsnip (Sium latafolium), Whorled Water Milfoil (Myriophyllum verticillatum) and Fen Pondweed (Potamogeton coloratus). The site is now connected to the Severn Estuary by the Portbury Ashlands nature reserve.
