= Hundred of Portbury =

Historical Hundred of Somerset, England

Portbury Hundred
- Area
- 23,980 acres (9,700 ha)
- Status: Hundred
  - HQ: Portbury
- Subdivisions
  - Type: Parishes
  - Units: Abbots Leigh, Bourton, Clapton, Clevedon, Easton in Gordano, Nailsea, Portbury, Portishead, Tickenham, Walton, Weston in Gordano, and Wraxall

The Hundred of Portbury is one of the 40 historical Hundreds in the ceremonial county of Somerset, England, dating from before the Norman conquest during the Anglo-Saxon era although exact dates are unknown. Each hundred had a 'fyrd', which acted as the local defence force and a court which was responsible for the maintenance of the frankpledge system. They also formed a unit for the collection of taxes. The role of the hundred court was described in the Dooms (laws) of King Edgar. The name of the hundred was normally that of its meeting-place.

The Hundred was recorded in the Domesday Book it was recorded as containing 86.5 hides. 63 of these paid rent to the King with the rest being held by barons.

The Hundred of Portbury consisted of the ancient parishes of: Abbots Leigh, Bourton, Clapton, Clevedon, Easton in Gordano, Nailsea, Portbury, Portishead, Tickenham, Walton, Weston in Gordano, and Wraxall. It covered an area of 23,980 acres (9,700 ha).

The importance of the hundred courts declined from the seventeenth century. By the 19th century several different single-purpose subdivisions of counties, such as poor law unions, sanitary districts, and highway districts sprang up, filling the administrative role previously played by parishes and hundreds. Although the Hundreds have never been formally abolished, their functions ended with the establishment of county courts in 1867 and the introduction of districts by the Local Government Act 1894.

The name the Portbury Hundreds is still used for the main road which connects Portishead to the M5 motorway.
