= Puxton Moor =

Protected area in Somerset, England

- Site of Special Scientific Interest
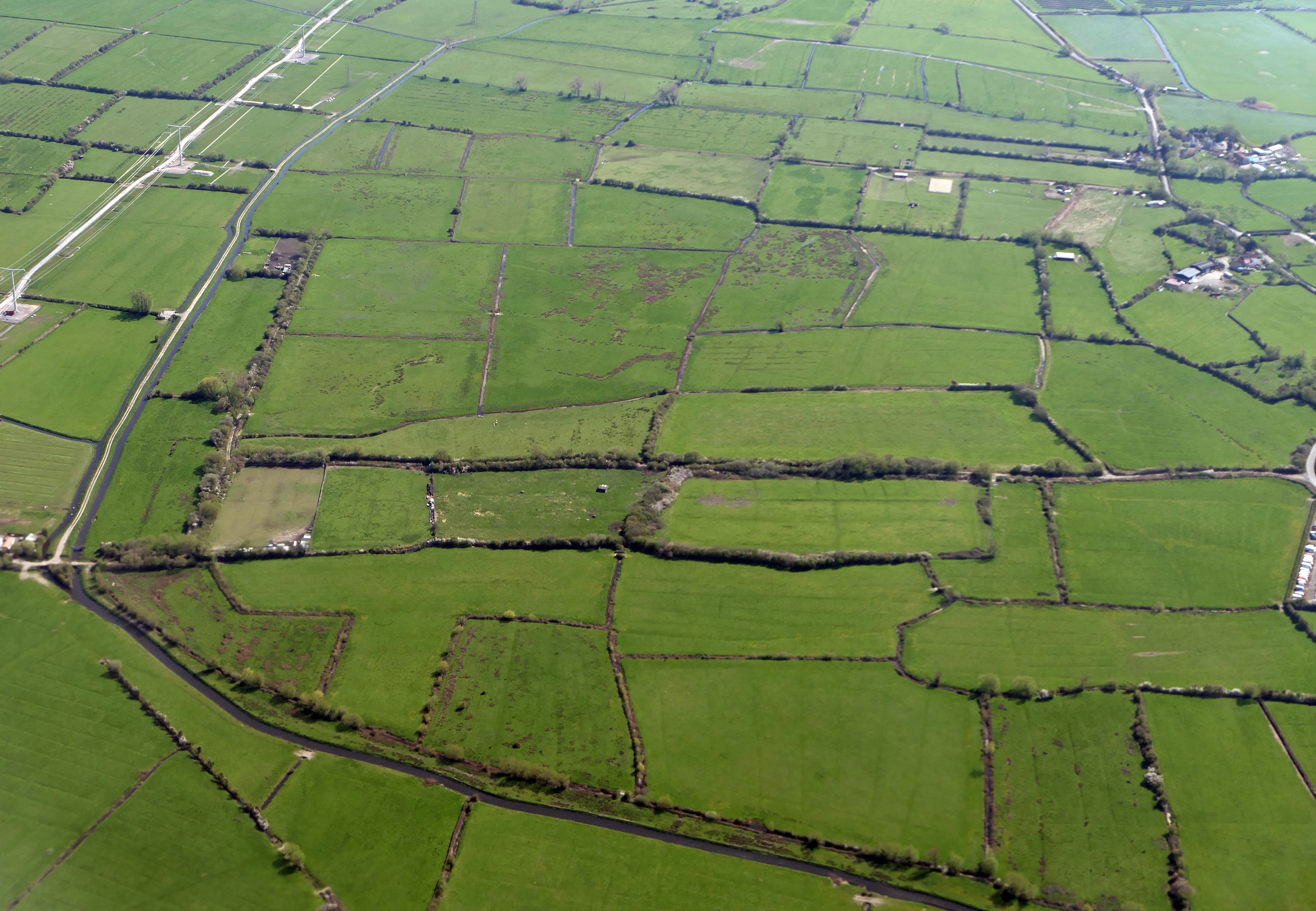

- Location within Somerset
- Location of Puxton Moor.
- Area of search: Avon
- Grid reference: ST412630
- Coordinates: 51.36301°N 2.84595°W
- Interest: Biological
- Area: 31.07 hectares (0.3107 km^{2}; 0.1200 sq mi)
- Notification date: 1994

Puxton Moor (grid reference ST412630) is a 31.07 ha (76.8 acres) biological Site of Special Scientific Interest on the North Somerset Levels, near Puxton, North Somerset, notified in 1994. It is a large area of pasture land networked with species-rich rhynes, now owned and managed as a nature reserve by Avon Wildlife Trust.

The rhynes contain rare plants such as frogbit and rootless duckweed, along with many scarce invertebrates such as the hairy dragonfly and water scorpion. Birds seen at the site include; skylark, reed and sedge warblers, Eurasian whimbrel, whitethroat and reed bunting.

The site also contains a relict Roman landscape which is evident in many of the fields; Medieval earthworks are also present.

== See also ==
- Biddle Street, Yatton and Tickenham, Nailsea and Kenn Moors, two other similar SSSIs on the North Somerset Levels.
