= Nightingale Valley =

- Site of Special Scientific Interest
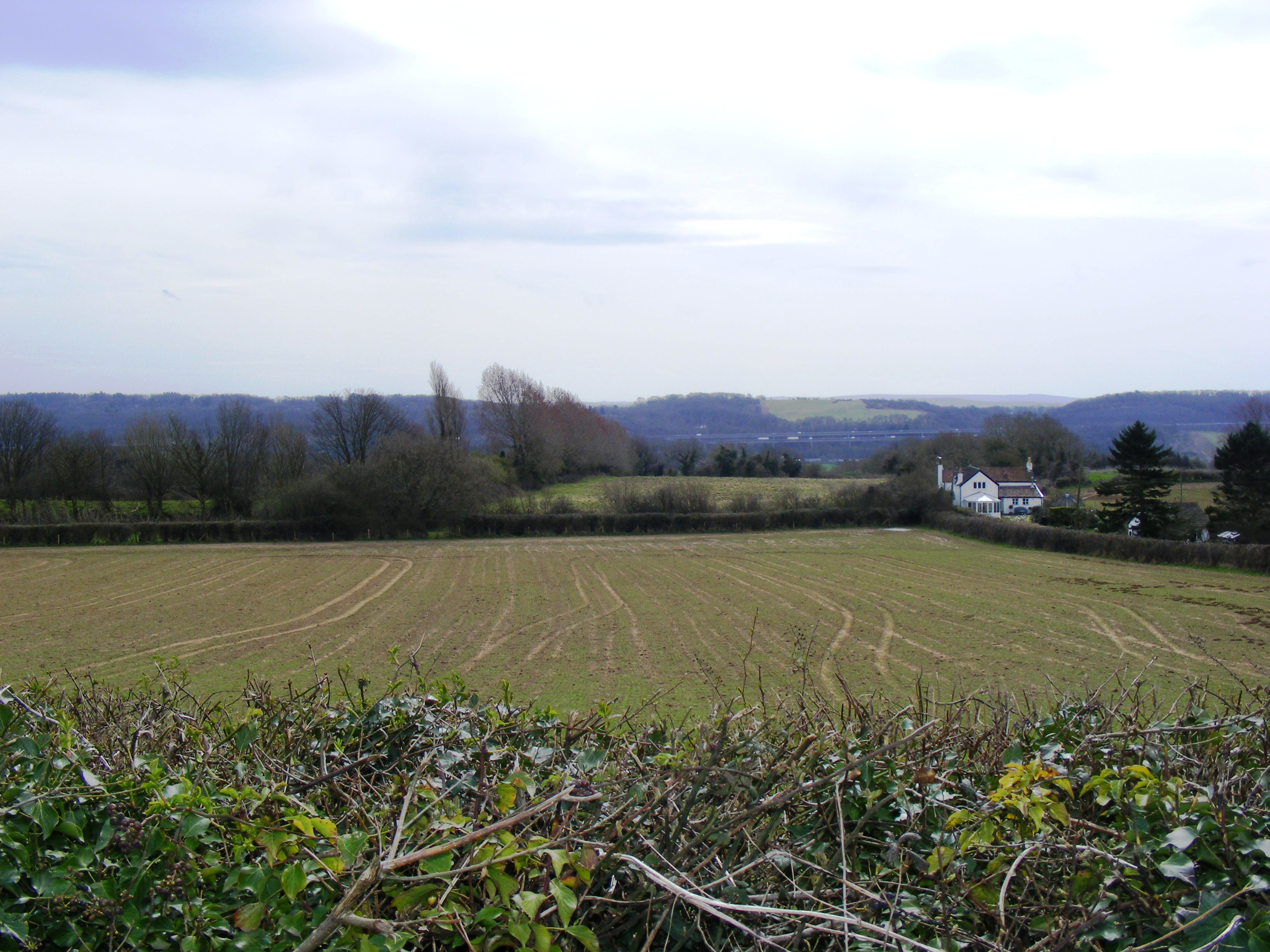

- Location within Somerset
- Location of Nightingale Valley.
- Area of search: Avon
- Grid reference: ST449751
- Coordinates: 51.47217°N 2.79469°W
- Interest: Geological
- Area: 5.4 hectares (0.054 km^{2}; 0.021 sq mi)
- Notification date: 1989

Nightingale Valley (grid reference ST449751) is a 5.4 hectare geological Site of Special Scientific Interest near the town of Portishead, North Somerset, notified in 1989.

This site in the Vale of Gordano is listed because of Pleistocene ‘plateau-deposits’ which include ‘cannon-shot’ gravels, fine sandy gravels and silty gravels with a wide range of erratic lithologies.
