= Walton Common banjo enclosure =

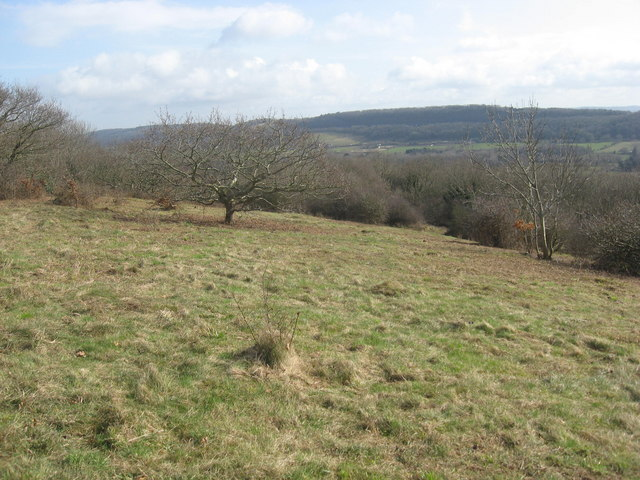
- Walton Common looking towards the banjo enclosure from the south west

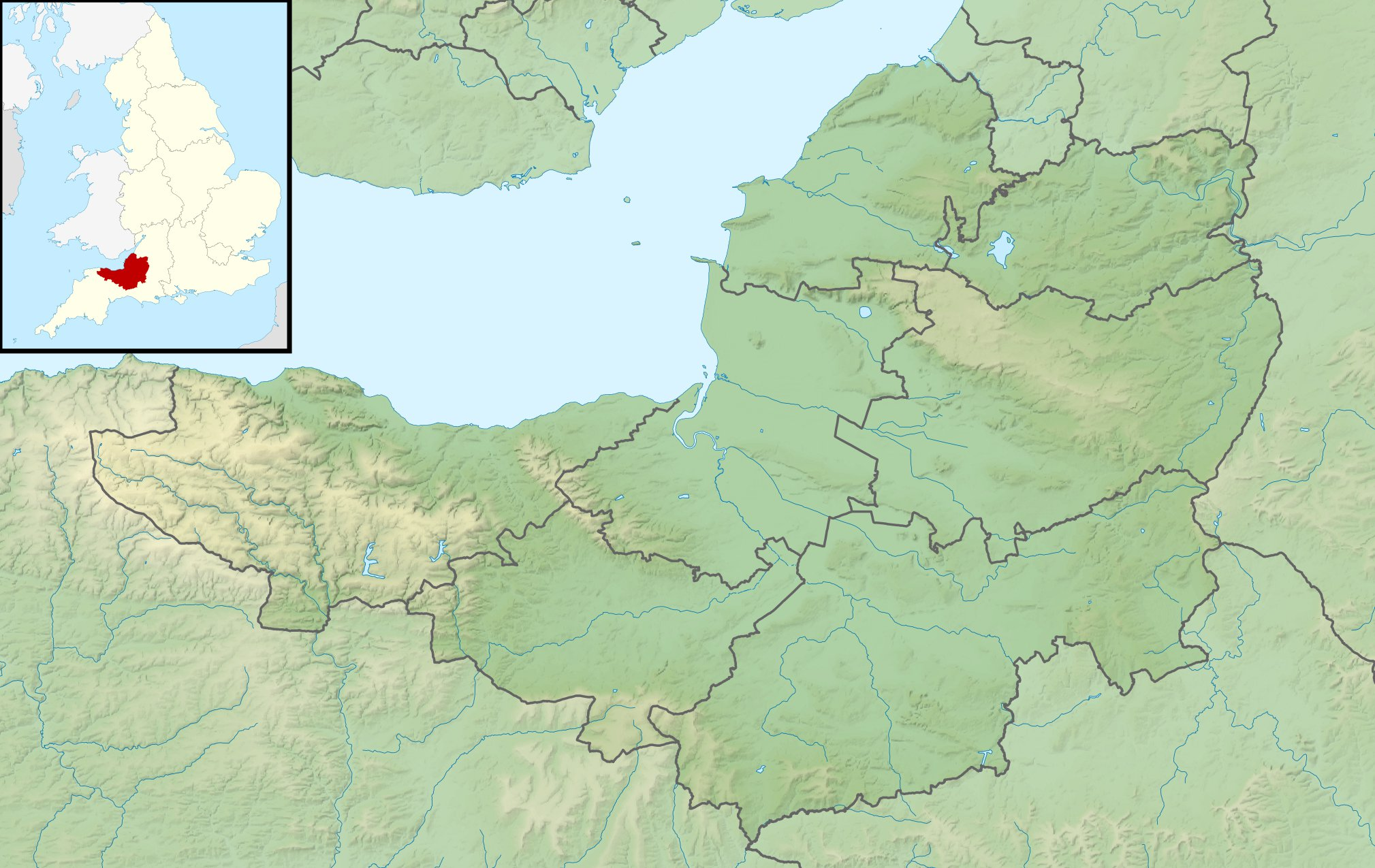
- Location in Somerset
- 51.459645°N 2.824126°W
- Type: Banjo enclosure
- Location: Walton in Gordano
- Region: Somerset

History
- Built: Iron age

Site notes
- Material: Earth

The Walton Common banjo enclosure is a banjo enclosure on Walton Common, to the north of Walton in Gordano, Somerset, England. It appears to date to the late Iron Age, and may have been a high-status settlement. The term "banjo" refers to the shape. It is a round enclosure approached by a straight avenue, with the enclosure and avenue bounded by banks and ditches. The banks have been worn down and the ditches filled in over time, so it is scarcely noticeable from the ground. It showed up on photographs from the air taken in 1930 and 1946. Since then the site has become more overgrown and is hard to detect even from the air.

== Location ==
The enclosure is on the Walton Down at ST 4289 7377, to the northeast of village of Walton in Gordano. The earthwork banks and ditch were detected from aerial photographs from 1930 and 1946. Since then many of the features have been hidden by encroaching vegetation. The earthworks are obscured by gorse, scrub, brambles and small bushes. They have been affected by ant hills, which often are found on former pastures, and by a rabbit warren from the Middle Ages. Two round Bronze Age barrows were found in a 1931 field survey on Walton Down near to the banjo enclosure.

Similar banjo enclosures elsewhere have been dated to the middle and late Iron Age. The enclosure may have been used to hold livestock or for a seasonal pastoral settlement. Earthworks of this form found in Ireland were used as sheep pens. However, recent research suggests that most banjo enclosures were settlement sites, and may have been occupied by people of high status.

The enclosure is one of just four that have been noted in Somerset by English Heritage, and is the easiest to see from the ground since the land has not been farmed for many years. It can be accessed by a medieval pathway that crosses the site.

== Description ==
The enclosure is oval, about 100 metres (330 ft) along the WSW-ENE axis and 88 metres (289 ft) along the NNW-SSE axis. It contains an area of about 7,000 square metres (75,000 sq ft). The enclosure is surrounded by a rampart of limestone blocks, mainly less than 2.5 feet (0.76 m) high. The inner bank is from 2 to 3 metres (6 ft 7 in to 9 ft 10 in) wide, with an outer ditch from 1 to 2 metres (3 ft 3 in to 6 ft 7 in) wide. The ditch is now about 9 inches (230 mm) deep and the banks now average 0.3 metres (1 ft 0 in) in height.

There are entrances on the south and north east sides, approached by paths between parallel banks. Two parallel banks extend 150 metres (490 ft) in a WSW-ENE direction from the ENE side. They are both about 2 metres (6 ft 7 in) wide, and are 8.5 to 9 metres (28 to 30 ft) apart. A linear NE-SW earth bank crosses the end of the avenue formed by these bank at right angles, with a 4 metres (13 ft) gap in the centre. It is about 3 metres (9.8 ft) wide and 81 metres (266 ft) long. The 1946 photograph shows what is probably a bomb crater in the ENE avenue.

There is a rhomboidal enclosure about 46 by 30 metres (151 by 98 ft) of earth banks and ditches about 70 metres (230 ft) southwest of the centre of the banjo enclosure, at ST 4295 7373.

== Sources ==
- Banjo Enclosures, Historic England
- Crowther, Stephen; Dickson, Amanda (2008), Severn Estuary Rapid Coastal Zone Assessment Survey, English Heritage NMR Services
- "Monument No. 195425", Historic England
- "Walton-in-Gordano Banjo Enclosure", Megalithic Portal
