= Dolebury Warren =

Hillfort in North Somerset

- Dolebury Camp
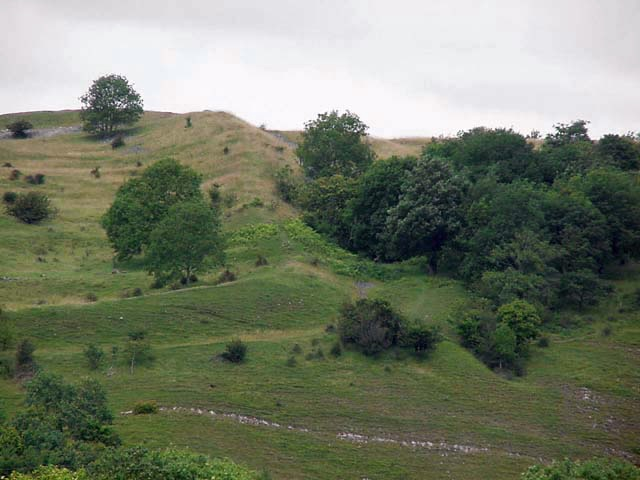

- Location within Somerset
- 51°19′39″N 2°47′01″W
- Location: Churchill, Somerset

Site notes
- Governing body: Avon Wildlife Trust
- Owner: National Trust

Scheduled monument
- Official name: Dolebury Camp
- Designated: 19 December 1929
- Reference no.: 1008184

Dolebury Warren (also known as Dolebury Camp) is a 90.6-hectare (224-acre) biological Site of Special Scientific Interest (SSSI) and ancient monument near the villages of Churchill and Rowberrow in North Somerset, part of South West England. It is owned by the National Trust, who acquired the freehold in 1983, and managed by the Avon Wildlife Trust.

Standing on a limestone ridge on the northern edge of the Mendip Hills, it was made into a hill fort during the Iron Age and was occupied into the Roman period. The extensive fort covers 9.1 hectares (22 acres) with single or double defensive ramparts around it. The name Dolebury Warren comes from its use during the medieval or post medieval periods as a rabbit warren. The topography and differing soil types provide a habitat for an unusually wide range of plants, attracting a variety of insects, including several species of butterfly.

== Geology and location ==
The site is at the top of a Carboniferous Limestone ridge on the northern edge of the Mendip Hills. It forms part of the Black Down Pericline where the limestone has been exposed because of erosion of the overlying Triassic dolomitic conglomerate. The soil depth varies considerably, owing to the slope within the site and the effects of its exposure to the wind.

Dolebury Warren overlooks the villages of Churchill and Rowberrow and provides good visibility across the surrounding lower lying areas as far as the Bristol Channel. The highest point, at the eastern end of the site is 183 metres (600 ft) OD, with the hillfort being up to 50 metres (160 ft) below this. It is the starting point for the Limestone Link, a 36-mile (58 km) long-distance footpath which ends at Cold Ashton in Gloucestershire.

== Description ==
The fort covers an area of 9.1 hectares (22 acres) and commands views over the surrounding countryside. The hill fort is bivallate on three sides and a single rampart on the southern side which is protected by a steep slope. It is almost rectangular with the longest axis from east to west being 487 metres (1,598 ft) long and 200 metres (660 ft) from north to south, surrounded by a rampart which is around 4 metres (13 ft) high and 12 metres (39 ft) wide. It was protected by a limestone rampart with a ditch and counterscarp on all sides but the south. There is an inturned entrance on the west and an annexe of 0.4 hectares (0.99 acres) protecting the easier eastern approach.

== History ==
=== Etymology ===
The name Dolebury may mean the idol hill from the Old English dwol and beorg.

=== Early ===
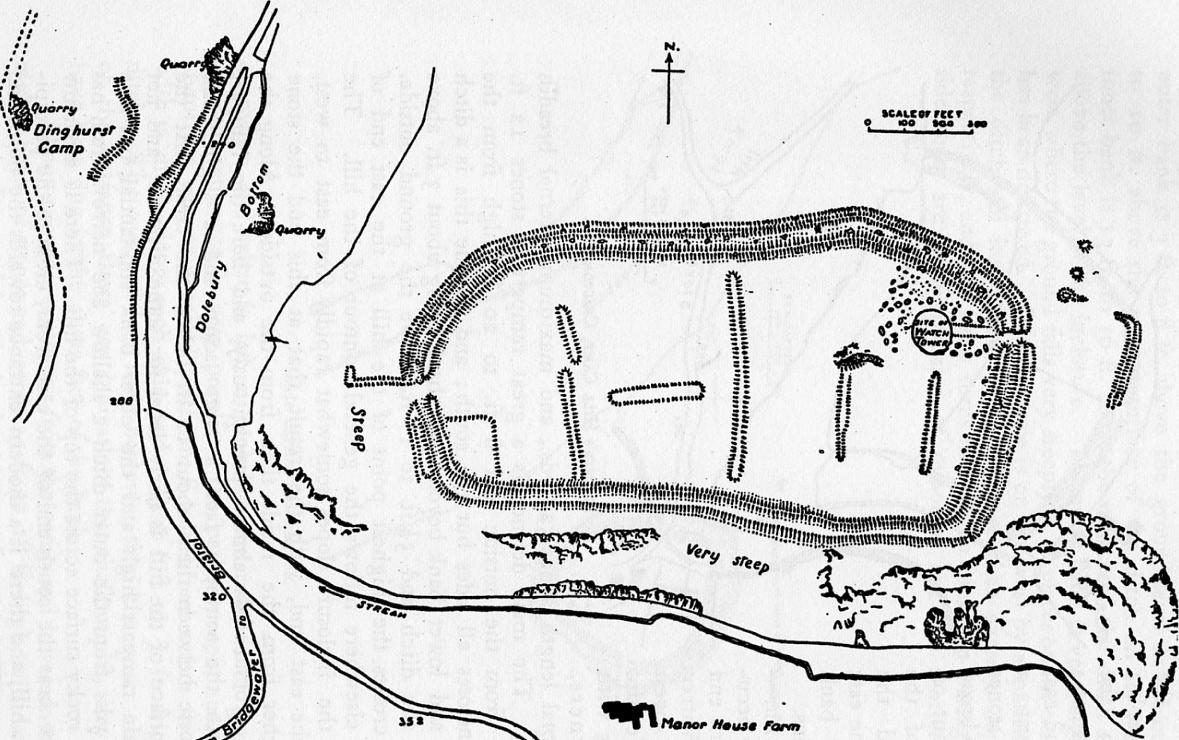
Earthworks at Dolebury Warren

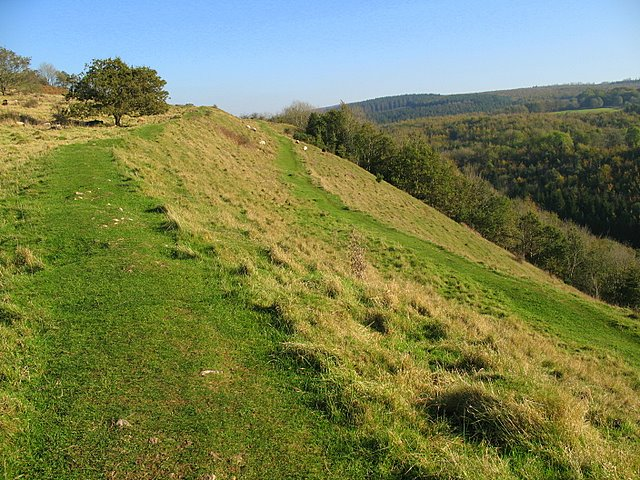
The southern ramparts

Various artefacts have been uncovered representing the long period of occupation of the site at Dolebury Warren. These include flintwork from the Palaeolithic, bronze spearheads, Bronze Age pottery, and Roman pottery and coins. There is evidence of occupation of the site during the Iron Age. The defences and Celtic field systems there date back to the 7th century−3rd century BCE, though they might mask earlier developments. The hillfort was occupied until approximately 100BC, though it is possible that it was reoccupied in the Roman and post-Roman periods. The archeological consultant Peter Leach has suggested there may even have been a Roman Temple built within the hillfort, while aerial photographs suggest the probable remains of an Iron Age or Roman coaxial field system. Local historian Robin Atthill also suggests that Dolebury may have re-emerged as an important centre of population in the 5th century.

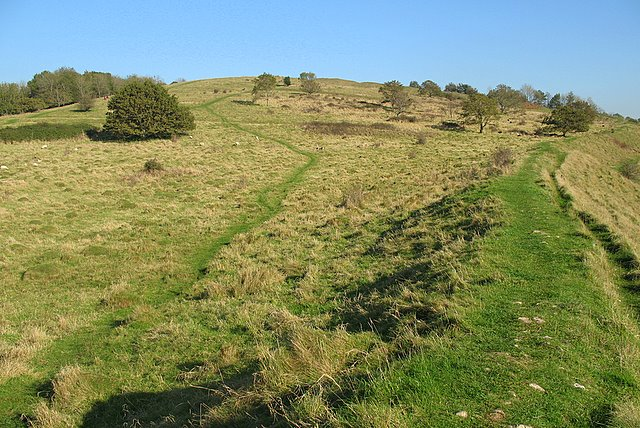
Looking east towards the highest point

=== Medieval ===
In the medieval or post-medieval period, the remains of the hillfort were used as a rabbit warren which was used to breed rabbits, providing valuable meat and fur. Many warrens were surrounded by banks or walls to prevent the rabbits from escaping; escaped rabbits caused damage to nearby farmland and meant a loss in profit. The warren at Dolebury is completely enclosed by the substantial ramparts of the Iron Age hill fort and thus provided an ideal location to breed rabbits. The presence of pillow mounds and vermin traps demonstrate management of the site for husbandry. Ridge and furrow agriculture has also been identified, from aerial photographs, within the fort. Some of these structures, along with earlier Iron Age features, have been damaged by subsequent quarrying which may have been for lead, ochre or calamine. The site was described by John Leland in the 16th century. A three-storey building, believed to be the warrener's house and possibly a watch tower, surrounded by a garden, was in ruins by 1830.

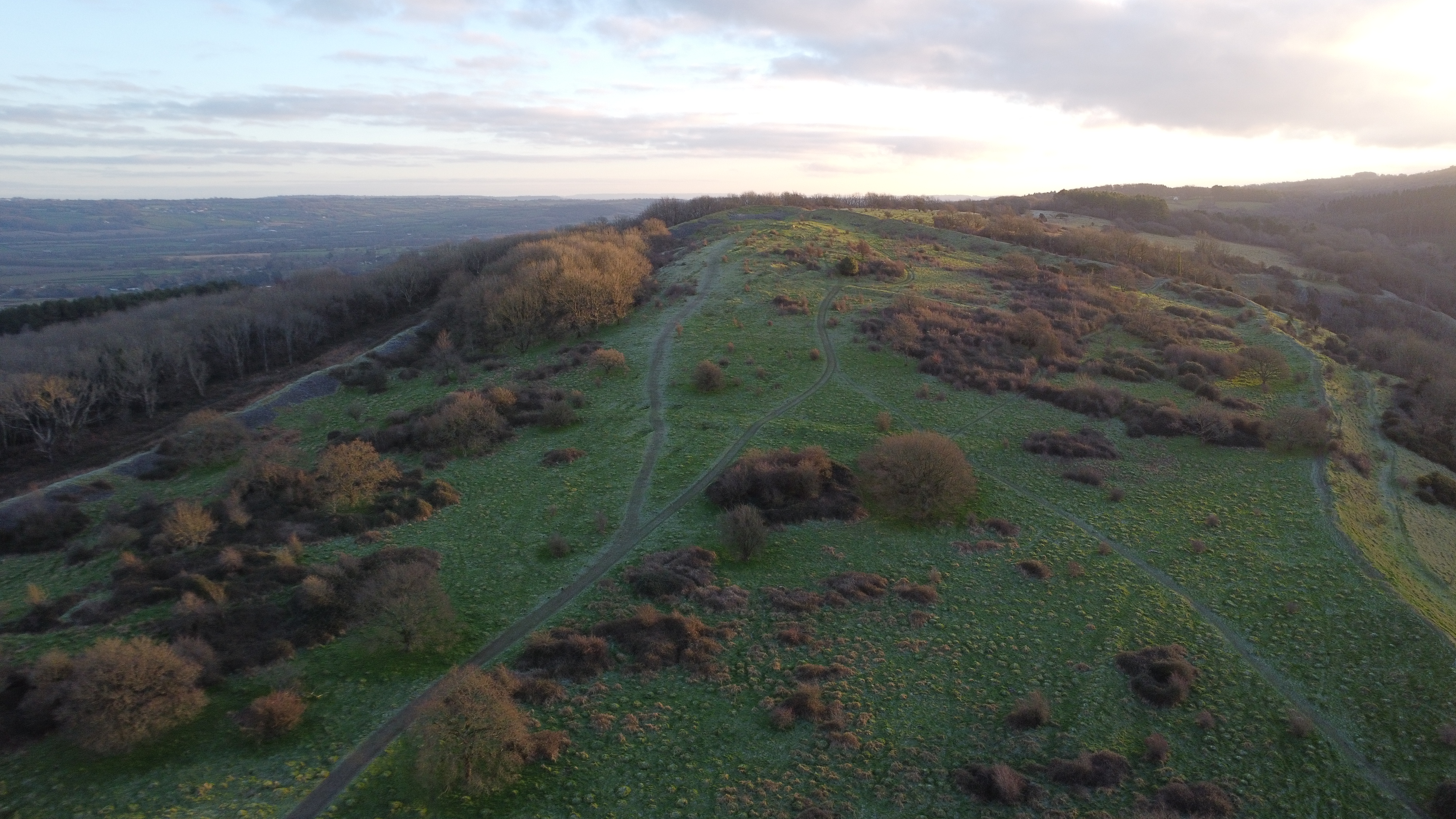
Dolebury Warren 30 minutes after sunrise looking east by northeast showing the northern, eastern, and southern ramparts. Photograph taken January 2024.

=== 19th and 20th centuries ===
The site was visited in the early 19th century by John Skinner and surveyed in 1872 by Charles William Dymond. In 1906 the Mendip Lodge Estate, which included Dolebury Warren, was sold. It was first scheduled as an ancient monument in 1929. In 1935 Dolebury Camp was bought by Miss V. Wills of the W.D. & H.O. Wills tobacco company to prevent development. Dolebury Warren was notified as a Site of Special Scientific Interest in 1952. The freehold of 92.657 hectares (228.96 acres) was acquired by the National Trust in 1983 from A. G. Gosling, D. F. Gosling and J. M. Kent, and is managed by the Avon Wildlife Trust.

== Ecology ==
Dolebury Warren
- Site of Special Scientific Interest
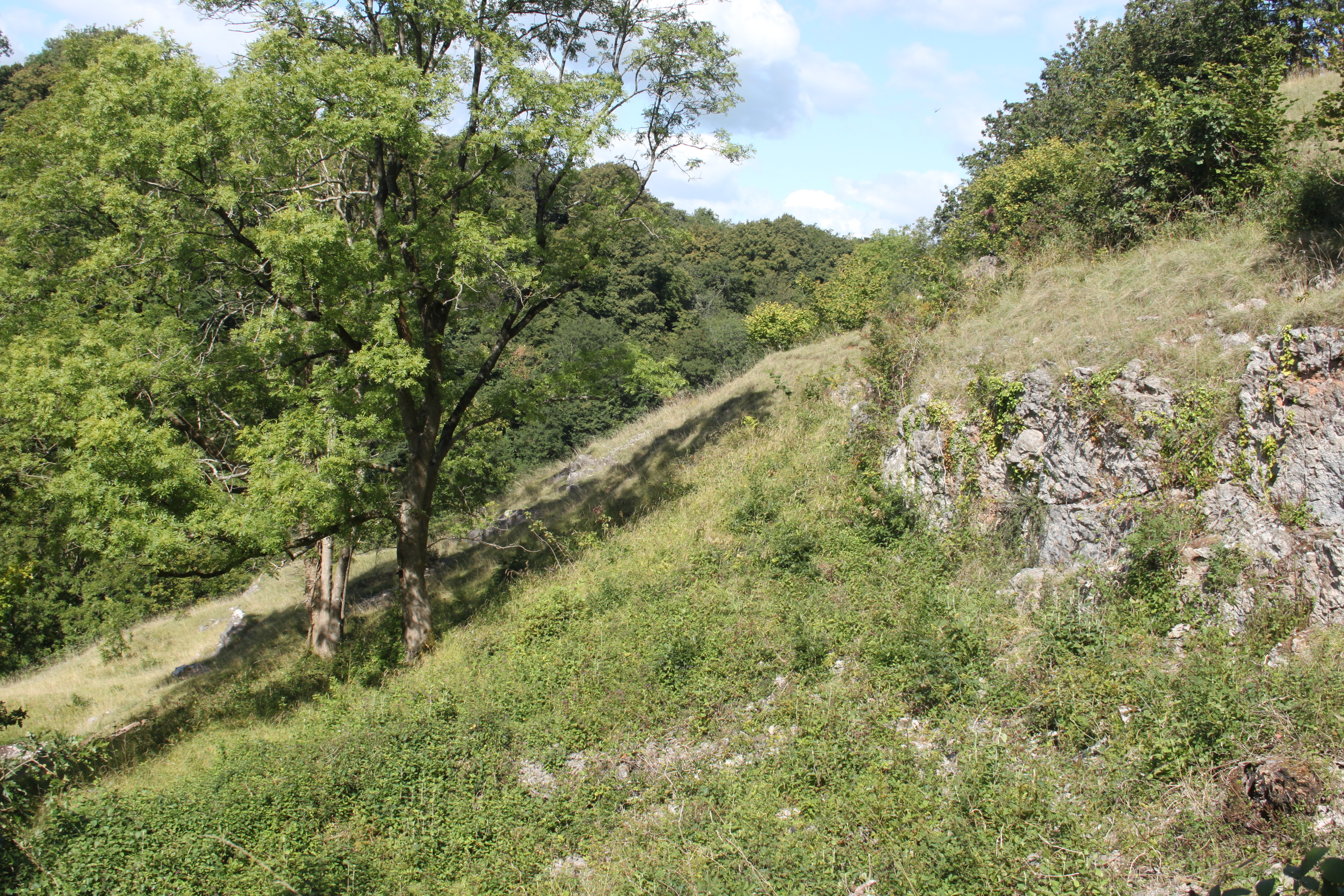
- Location of Dolebury Warren.
- Area of search: Avon
- Interest: Biological
- Area: 90.6 hectares (0.906 km^{2}; 0.350 sq mi)
- Notification date: 1952

The site of the fort and warren is now grassy slopes which attract a wide range of wild flowers and butterflies. The differing soil types provide suitable habitats for both acid- and lime-loving plants. Kidney vetch (Anthyllis vulneraria), harebell (Campanula rotundifolia) and woolly thistle (Cirsium eriophorum) thrive on the dry stony soils. Heath bedstraw (Galium saxatile) and wood sage (Teucrium scorodonia) are found in more acidic areas. The higher areas support bell heather (Erica cinerea), western gorse (Ulex gallii) and common heather (Calluna vulgaris). Trees and shrubs include the wayfaring tree (Viburnum lantana), guelder rose (Viburnum opulus), whitebeam (Sorbus aria), privet (Ligustrum vulgare) and dogwood (Cornus sanguinea).

Scarce plants found at the warren include knotted pearlwort (Sagina nodosa), and slender bedstraw (Galium pumilum). Butterflies recorded here include the small blue (Cupido minimus), marbled white (Melanargia galathea), dingy skipper (Erynnis tages), grizzled skipper (Pyrgus malvae), small pearl-bordered fritillary (Boloria selene), and wall brown (Lasiommata megera).

== See also ==
- List of hillforts and ancient settlements in Somerset

== Bibliography ==
- Aston, Michael; Burrow, Ian (1991). The Archaeology of Somerset. Somerset County Council. ISBN 978-0-86183-028-2.
- Atthill, Robin (1976). Mendip A New Study. David & Charles. ISBN 0-7153-7297-1.
- Bowden, Mark (2009). "Dolebury Hillfort, Churchill, North Somerset: Analytical Earthwork Survey" (PDF). Research Department Report Series. English Heritage. ISSN 1749-8775. Archived from the original (PDF) on 26 August 2014.
- Dyer, James (2001). Discovering Prehistoric England. Osprey Publishing. ISBN 978-0-7478-0507-6.
- Farrant, Andy (2008). A walkers' Guide to the Geology and Landscape of Western Mendip. British Geological Survey. ISBN 978-0-85272-576-4.
- Leach, Peter (2001). Roman Somerset. Dovecote Press. ISBN 1-874336-93-8.
- Myles, Sarah (2000). The Flora of the Bristol Region. ISBN 1-874357-18-8.
- Payne, Andrew; Corney, Mark; Cunliffe, Barry (2007), The Wessex Hillforts Project: Extensive Survey of Hillfort Interiors in Central Southern England, English Heritage, p. 1, ISBN 978-1-873592-85-4
- Sharples, Niall M (1991), English Heritage Book of Maiden Castle, London: B. T. Batsford, ISBN 0-7134-6083-0
- Williamson, Tom (2006). The Archaeology of Rabbit Warrens. Shire Publications. ISBN 978-0-7478-0616-5.
