= Bristol power stations =

Avonbank Feeder Road power station
- Country: England
- Location: Bristol
- Coordinates: 51°27′00″N 02°34′00″W
- Status: Decommissioned and demolished
- Commission date: 1902
- Decommission date: 1959
- Owners: Bristol Corporation (1893–1948), British Electricity Authority (1948–55), Central Electricity Authority (1955–57), Central Electricity Generating Board (1958–59)
- Operators: Bristol Corporation (1893–1948), British Electricity Authority (1948–55), Central Electricity Authority (1955–57), Central Electricity Generating Board (1958–59)

Thermal power station
- Primary fuel: Coal
- Turbine technology: Reciprocating engines and steam turbines
- Cooling source: Canal water and cooling tower

Power generation
- Units operational: see text
- Nameplate capacity: 25,890 kW (1923)
- Annual net output: 48,116 MWh (1923)

Bristol power stations supplied electricity to the City of Bristol and the surrounding area from 1893 to 1959. Temple Back and Avonbank (Feeder Road) power stations were built by the Bristol Corporation which operated them up to the nationalisation of the British electricity supply industry in 1948.

Refer to article on Portishead power station for details about that station.

== History ==
Bristol Corporation applied in 1883 for a provisional order under the Electric Lighting Acts to generate and supply electricity to the City of Bristol. An Order was granted by the Board of Trade and was confirmed by Parliament through the Electric Lighting Orders Confirmation (No. 9) Act 1883 (46 & 47 Vict. c. ccxxi). A power station was eventually built in Temple Back south of St Philip's bridge, and was commissioned on 20 August 1893. The electricity plant installed had a generating capacity of 700 kW. The corporation charged 6d. and 4d./kWh and had 814 customers in 1898. By 1898 the generating capacity was 1,972 kW, the maximum load was 1,010 kW, and the plant generated a total of 1,163 MWh in 1898. In 1900 a special power tariff of 1 1/2 d./kWh was introduced, and in 1902 a cooker tariff of 1d./kWh.

The generating station at Temple Back was extended with new plant as demand for electricity grew. However, by 1900 the station was filled to capacity with 18 generators. A new power station, Avonbank, was constructed in Feeder Road (51°27′00″N 02°34′00″W) this was commissioned in 1902. It originally had two 745 kW generating sets. The station's name was changed from Avonbank to Feeder Road in 1916.

Bristol tramways had an independent electricity generating station in Temple Back north of St Philip's bridge.

The Central Electricity Board built the first stages of the National Grid between 1927 and 1933. Bristol power stations were connected to the electricity grid. Bristol was part of a major 132 kV North–South line from Kilmarnock to Carlisle, Lancaster, Stoke, Bristol and Hayle. A new power station at Portishead was commissioned in 1929. This was connected to the Feeder Road station through 33 kV cables.

The British electricity supply industry was nationalised in 1948 under the provisions of the Electricity Act 1947 (10 & 11 Geo. 6. c. 54). The Bristol electricity undertaking was abolished, ownership of Bristol power stations were vested in the British Electricity Authority, and subsequently the Central Electricity Authority and the Central Electricity Generating Board (CEGB). At the same time the electricity distribution and sales responsibilities of the Bristol electricity undertaking were transferred to the South Western Electricity Board (SWEB).

Following nationalisation Bristol Feeder Road power station became part of the Bristol electricity supply district.

Feeder Road power station was closed in 1959.

== Equipment specification ==
By 1898 the plant in the original Temple Back power station was rated at 1,972 kW and comprised Willans engines coupled directly to Siemens alternators.

=== Plant in 1923 ===
By 1923 the plant at Temple Back comprised boilers delivering a total of 53,000 lb/h (6.68 kg/s) of steam to:

- 1 × 400 kW reciprocating engine generating alternating current (AC).
- 2 × 165 kW reciprocating engines generating direct current (DC)
- 3 × 210 kW reciprocating engines generating DC
- 1 × 400 kW reciprocating engine generating DC

The total generating capacity was 2,300 kW

By 1923 the plant at Feeder Road comprised boilers delivering a total of 432,000 lb/h (54.4 kg/s) of steam to:

- 1 × 600 kW turbine driven alternator generating AC
- 2 × 750 kW reciprocating engine driven alternators generating AC
- 3 × 750 kW turbine driven alternators generating AC
- 1 × 2,000 kW turbine driven alternator generating AC
- 3 × 3,000 kW turbine driven alternators generating AC
- 1 × 4,000 kW turbine driven alternator generating AC
- 1 × 6,000 kW turbine driven alternator generating AC
- 2 × 165 kW reciprocating engine driven generators generating DC
- 1 × 210 kW reciprocating engine driven generator generating DC

The total generating capacity was 25,890 kW.

The following electricity supplies were available to consumers:

- 365 & 210 Volts, 3-phase, 50 Hz AC
- 210 & 105 Volts, 1-phase, 93 Hz AC
- 500 & 250 Volts DC

=== Plant in 1954 ===
By 1954 the plant at Feeder Road comprised:

- Boilers:
  - 2 × Vickers 35,000 lb/h (4.41 kg/s) boilers
  - 1 × Vickers 80,000 lb/h (10.08 kg/s) boiler

Total evaporative capacity 150,000 lb/h (18.9 kg/s), steam conditions were 200 psi and 570 °F (13.8 bar and 300 °C), steam was supplied to:

- Generators:
  - 3 × 7.0 MW Vickers turbo-alternators, 3-phase, 50 Hz, 6,600 volts
  - 1 × 4.15 MW Vickers turbo-alternator, 3-phase, 50 Hz, 6,600 volts

The total installed capacity was 25.15 MW.

Condenser water was abstracted from the canal, supplemented by a wooden cooling tower.

== Operations ==
In 1897 Temple Back power station sold 376,490 kWh of electricity, the maximum load was 404 kW.

In 1911 there were 3,600 customers and the maximum demand was 6,000 kW.

=== Operating data 1921–1923 ===
The electricity supply data for the period 1921–23 was:

Bristol power stations supply data 1921–1923 (Quantities in MWh)
Electricity Use	Year		
Electricity Use	1921	1922	1923
Lighting and domestic	10,346	5,908	7,314
Public lighting	1,249	1,132	1,392
Traction	0	0	0
Power	20,585	28,701	33,223
Bulk supply	1,347	1,338	1,287
Total use	33,529	37,079	48,116

Electricity loads on the system were:

Year		1921	1922	1923
Maximum load	kW	14,301	14,812	17,840
Total connections	kW	37,905	44,335	47,253
Load factor	Per cent	32.5	33.9	32.7

Revenue from the sale of current (in 1923) was £336,335; the surplus of revenue over expenses was £132,729.

=== Operating data 1946 ===
In 1946 Bristol (Feeder Road) power station supplied 31,078 MWh of electricity; the maximum output load was 29,750 kW.

=== Operating data 1954–1958 ===
Operating data for the period 1954–58 was:

Bristol power station operating data, 1954–1958
Year	Running hours	Max output capacity (MW)	Electricity supplied (MWh)	Thermal efficiency (per cent)
1954	1,049	28	9,002	7.89
1955	1,630	25	18,152	8.66
1956	1,588	25	15,382	8.62
1957	1,219	25	8,574	7.34
1958	215	25	91	0.52

== Bristol Electricity District ==
Following nationalisation in 1948 Bristol power stations including Portishead became part of the Bristol electricity supply district, covering 125.6 square miles (325.3 km^{2}) with a population of 538,300 in 1958. The number of consumers and electricity sold in the Bristol district was:

Year	1955	1956	1957
Number of consumers	165,305	170,634	175,148
Electricity sold GWh	606.41	665.6	743.6

In 1957 the number of units sold to categories of consumers was:

Type of consumer	No. of consumers	Electricity sold GWh
Household	159,093	234.1
Shops and Offices	17,172	187.0
Factories	1,818	309.5
Farms	491	3.4
Traction	0	0
Public lighting	17	9.6
Total	178,511	743.6

== Demolition and reuse ==
The power station building in Temple Back has been converted to offices. The power station in Feeder Road was demolished and the site is now used for industrial and commercial premises. A National Grid sub-station is extant to the south of the site.

== See also ==
- Portishead power station
- Bristol tramways
- Timeline of the UK electricity supply industry
- List of power stations in England
