= Avon Wildlife Trust =

Wildlife conservation charity

- Formation: 1981
- Type: Registered charity
- Headquarters: Great George Street, Bristol, BS1 5QT
- Members: 18,000
- Chief Executive: Leah McNally
- Website: www.avonwildlifetrust.org.uk

The Avon Wildlife Trust aims to protect and promote wildlife in the area of the former county of Avon – now Bath and North East Somerset, Bristol, North Somerset and South Gloucestershire, in England. It has its headquarters in Bristol and runs wildlife centres at Folly Farm, Somerset and Grow Wilder, Frenchay, North Bristol.

The trust was formed in 1980, has 17,500 members, and manages 35 nature reserves, ranging from salt marshes and reedbeds to wildflower meadows and ancient woodlands, covering a total of 7 square kilometres (3 sq mi) including 12 Sites of Special Scientific Interest. The trust also provides advice to local authorities and landowners on land management and conservation, and provides educational visits for school children and lifelong learning for adults.

The Avon Wildlife Trust is part of the Wildlife Trusts partnership of 46 wildlife trusts in the United Kingdom, and carries out its work through a network of staff and over 500 volunteers.

== History ==
The first development following the formation of the trust in 1980 was the establishment of England's first urban nature reserve at Brandon Hill, bringing hay meadows, wildlife ponds and butterfly gardens into a formal city park. In 1981 Stockwood Open Space came under the trust's management to encourage a range of wildlife and have been particularly successful with common spotted orchids. Other early work in the 1980s included taking over the management of Littleton Brick Pits near Littleton-upon-Severn, an artificial lagoon once the site of clay extraction for brick making, and reintroducing reedbeds close to the Severn Estuary, as a feeding and resting place for migrating birds.

Since the 1980s the trust has campaigned to save wetlands in the Gordano Valley in North Somerset where Clapton Moor (40 hectares of grassland) near Clapton in Gordano, Weston Big Wood, (38 hectares of ancient woodland), and Weston Moor (59 hectares of wet grassland) near Weston in Gordano and Walton Common north east of Walton in Gordano are now rich in birdlife. The installation of sluice gates in the 1990s raised the water levels and encouraged lapwing to breed.

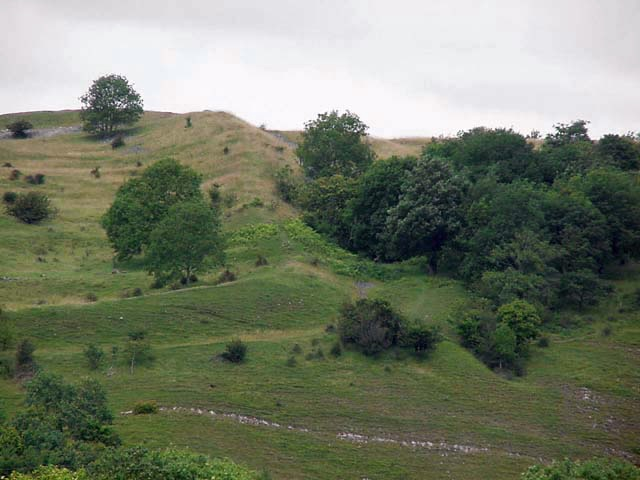
Dolebury Warren

At Dolebury Warren Iron Age hillfort, special grassland and rare butterflies have been encouraged by the trust's scrub clearance work.

In 1987 the 250-acre (1.0 km^{2}) Folly Farm was purchased from the Strachey family to be developed as a nature reserve with traditional farm operations. The purchase was made possible by an anonymous donation of £250,000, which was followed by grants and donations from the South West of England Regional Development Agency, and Biffaward supplementing local fund-raising efforts with the centre finally opening in April 2008.

The trust was one of the first to carry out garden wildlife surveys. One of these revealed the astonishingly rich flora that existed in Narroways, St Werburghs, an inner area of Bristol, and was used as part of a campaign against the use of 5 acres (20,000 m^{2}) of the hill as a storage depot for heavy equipment and lorry access for construction of the Avon Tramway.

In 1991 campaigns to save Royate Hill in Bristol from development resulted in the first compulsory purchase of a wildlife site in England. In another Bristol campaign, the trust fought Bristol City Council against the extension of the quarry next to Ashton Court. In 1997 the trust bought Puxton Moor to prevent it being converted into a golf course and holiday resort. Other campaign have included preserving breeding space for skylarks at Hengrove Park.

The oldest greater horseshoe bat ever recorded in Britain, "Boris", was discovered at Brown's Folly in January 2000. The mines themselves are of great speleological and historical interest. They are extremely well decorated and contain many delicate stalactites and examples of gull formation (caves features formed by landslippage). The mine provided stone for the facade of Buckingham palace. In 2000 access was unilaterally withdrawn pending the results of a mine inspectors report on the safety of the mines. This report was required because of the health and safety at work act which affects employees/volunteers of the trust who might have to enter the mine to count the bats. These legal requirements do not affect leisure access by cavers. Prior to 2000 access to the mine was controlled by the CSCC and cavers had coexisted with a thriving bat population with voluntary restrictions on the access during the bat roosting season. There is no evidence of caving activity adversely affecting the bat population.

Since 2000 the trust has been a leading partner in the Avon Biodiversity Partnership which aims to create "A landscape rich in wildlife, where species and habitats are part of healthy, functioning ecosystems that are well-managed and valued by everyone; where conservation of biodiversity is integrated with social, cultural and economic activities".

Each winter since 2000/2001 the trust has organised a birdwatch. Between 2000 and 2007 this demonstrated falls in the starling and sparrow populations, with great spotted woodpeckers and jackdaws on the increase within the area.

In 2008 a successful bid to the Heritage Lottery Fund resulted in an award of £396,000 for the new 'Wildlife – it's all about us!' project which will offer a variety of ways for people to get active in their own neighbourhoods through talks, walks, and events, including wildlife gardening workshops and practical volunteering work.

At its Portbury reserve, nearby residents pay a levy of £70 a year to the trust for the reserve's upkeep; this has generated some criticisms over the trust's transparency, with some residents saying that the trust has not told them what it spends the money on.

On 25 April 2022, Avon Wildlife Trust announced the relocation of its headquarters from 32, Jacobs well road to 17, Great George Street (51.45363°N 2.60375°W). The former headquarters was listed in June of the same year, and eventually sold at auction in February 2023 for £850,00.

== Nature reserves ==
Avon Wildlife Trust's newest nature reserve, Bennett's Patch and White's Paddock will see a 12-acre neglected former sports facility transformed into a wildlife haven of wildflower meadows, native woodland, hedgerows and ponds in time for Bristol as European Green Capital 2015. Once open, the plan is to use the new Bennett's Patch and White's Paddock Reserve to encourage people to create new homes for wildlife in their own gardens.
The Nature Reserves include: (* = Reserves designated as Sites of Special Scientific Interest)

- Ashton Court Meadow
- Bathampton Meadow
- Bennett's Patch and White's Paddock
- Blake's Pools near Kingston Seymour
- Brandon Hill
- Brown's Folly*
- Burledge Hill*
- Charfield Meadow
- Chew Valley Lake*
- Clapton Moor
- Cleeve Heronry
- Coombe Brook Valley
- Dolebury Warren*
- Folly Farm, Somerset*
- Goblin Combe*
- Hellenge Hill
- Lawrence Weston Moor
- Littleton Brick Pits
- Lower Woods*
- Max Bog*
- Netcott's Meadow
- Pill Paddock
- Portbury Wharf
- Prior's Wood
- Priory Farm
- Purn Hill*
- Puxton Moor*
- Royate Hill
- Stephen's Vale
- Stockwood Open Space
- Tickenham Hill
- Walborough
- Walton Common*
- Weston Big Wood*
- Weston Moor
- Willsbridge Mill & Valley

Avon Wildlife Trust also run Grow Wilder a wildlife-friendly food growing project.
