= Portishead power station =

Series of two coal and oil-fired power stations

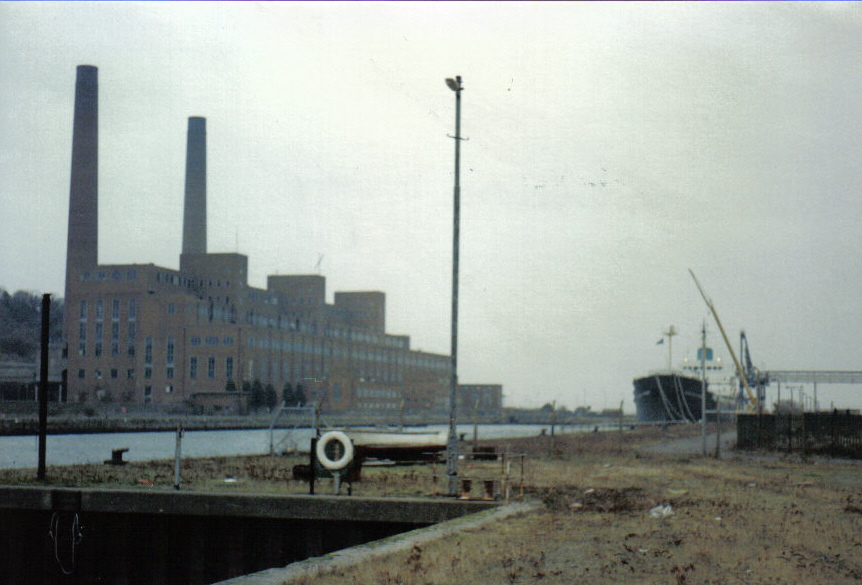
- Portishead B Power Station awaiting demolition in 1989.
- Country: England
- Location: Somerset, South West England
- Coordinates: 51.4912°N 2.7551°W
- Status: Decommissioned and demolished
- Construction began: A: 1926, B: 1949
- Commission date: A: 1929, B: 1955
- Decommission date: A: 1976, B: 1982
- Owner: As operator
- Operators: Bristol Corporation Electricity Dept. (1926–1948); British Electricity Authority (1948–1955); Central Electricity Authority (1955–1957); Central Electricity Generating Board (1958–1982)

Thermal power station
- Primary fuel: Coal
- Tertiary fuel: Oil-fired
- Chimneys: 2
- Cooling towers: None
- Cooling source: Seawater

Power generation
- Units operational: B: 6 × 60 MW
- Make and model: B: Metropolitan-Vickers
- Units decommissioned: All units decommissioned
- Nameplate capacity: A: 240 MW, B: 339 MW
- Annual net output: B: 26.874 GWh (1980–81)

External links
- Commons: Related media on Commons

Portishead Power Station refers to a series of two coal and oil-fired power stations which operated in the dock area of Portishead in Somerset, South West England, between 1929 and 1982.

The original coal-fired Portishead power station was built by Bristol Corporation's Electricity Department and started generating in 1929. It was later expanded, and renamed Portishead A Power Station after Portishead B Power Station opened in the early 1950s. The newer station had one-third of its boilers oil-fired and two-thirds coal-fired. Both power stations were later converted to fully oil-fired operation.

They closed in the late 1970s and early 1980s respectively, and the buildings and dock area were demolished and cleared. The site of the two power stations is now occupied by housing and the dock has become a marina.

== Portishead A power station ==
The first Portishead power station was built by Bristol Corporation's Electricity Department, as their earlier power stations in Bristol – the first at Temple Back (opened 1891) and the second at the Feeder Canal – became inadequate to meet demand. Construction at Portishead Dock started in 1926 and the station began generating electricity in 1929 containing 2 x 20,000 kW turbo alternators.

With the creation of the Central Electricity Board (CEB) in 1926 and the establishment of the 132 kV National Grid, Portishead Power station, when it opened, remained under the day-to-day control of Bristol Corporation but was also subject to control by the CEB. It supplied power to the grid and in 1931 its installed capacity was advertised as being in excess of 100,000 horsepower (75 MW). In 1937 its original six short chimney stacks were replaced by a 350 feet (110 m) high stack.

In 1948, the British Electricity Authority (BEA) was established, with the nationalisation of the UK's electricity supply industry, through the authority of the Electricity Act 1947. The BEA took over the operations of over 600 private power companies and local council power stations to form 14 area boards. Portishead Power Station ceased to be owned by Bristol Corporation and was now operated by the BEA. Generating capacity was increased in 1948 and a second 350 feet (110 m) stack was added. When building work on the new Portishead B Power Station began in 1949, the original station was renamed Portishead A.

By 1949 the station could generate 240 MW of electricity. In 1972 it had three 55 MW and one 54 MW generating sets giving a capacity of 219 MW; the boilers delivered 1,600,000 lb/h (201.6 kg/s) of steam at 300 psi (20.7 bar) and 427 °C. In that year the A station sent out 276.5 GWh of electricity (and the B station 1899 GWh).

== Portishead B power station ==
The BEA started building the Portishead "B" power station in 1949 on part of the site of the Great Western Railway's original Portishead railway station, which was closed on 4 January 1954 and demolished. A replacement railway station was opened some 400 metres nearer the centre of Portishead.

The B power station was built with twelve Mitchell Engineering Ltd 300,000 lb/hr steam boilers: eight coal/oil fired and four oil-fired. The boilers were rated to deliver 456 kg/s of steam at 62.1 bar and 482 °C. There were six Metropolitan-Vickers 60 MW turbo-alternators giving the station a gross rated output of 363 MW.The station needed a very deep cooling water system due to the high tidal range of the River Severn at this location. The new power station began generating in 1955; however, in 1954 the British Electricity Authority was replaced by the Central Electricity Authority (CEA). The CEA itself was abolished in 1957 and both power stations came under the control of the Central Electricity Generating Board (CEGB). The generating capacity, electricity output, load factor and thermal efficiency were as shown in the table.

Year	Net capability, MW	Generation, GWh	Load as per cent of capability, %	Thermal efficiency, %
1960	366	2281.8	75	29.74
1961	390	2131.1	66.5	29.77
1962	366	1950.5	60.8	29.77
1963	366	1891.4	59.0	29.97
1967	396	1789.9	54.9	30.17
1972	397	1899.0	58.0	29.81
1979	363	521.8	17.6	26.70
1981	363	26.9	0.9	17.00
1982	363	4.1	–	–

The stations remained under the control of the CEGB until their closure and demolition.

== Operations ==
The power stations took coal from the Somerset coalfield and from the South Wales coalfields. After 1966, Lower Writhlington and Kilmersdon pits – both served by the Bristol and North Somerset Railway – were the only remaining working pits in the Somerset coalfield, with Portishead power stations as their main customer. Coal transported to the power stations by train entered the site along the Portishead Railway. Opened on 12 April 1867 as the Bristol and Portishead Pier and Railway Company, the line had been extended to the dock on 5 July 1879.

Welsh coal was also brought across the Bristol Channel from the South Wales coalfield by a fleet of boats. The Dock Master reported that 2,000 tonne per day was imported from South Wales for the A station through Portishead Dock, and that this was expected to increase to about 5,000 tonne per day when the B station came into operation.

Condensing water was taken from the Bristol Channel.

== Rundown ==
The CEGB fully converted the two power stations to burn oil after collieries in the Somerset coalfield closed. The two Radstock pits ceased production in September 1973 and the last trainload of coal arrived at the station on 16 November 1973. The price of oil rose steeply in the 1970s (see 1973 oil crisis and 1979 oil crisis) and the two power stations were little used thereafter. By this time Hinkley Point A nuclear power station and Hinkley Point B nuclear power station had come into operation, reducing demand for electricity produced from burning coal.

== Closure and demolition ==
Portishead A Power Station ceased generating electricity on 15 March 1976. By this time its generating capacity had fallen to 96 MW. The first of its two chimneys was demolished in September 1981 and the second in August 1982. The B Station closed in 1982. Its two 383 feet (117 m) chimneys were demolished in October 1992.

An area between the site of the power stations and Royal Portbury Dock which was used to dump the waste from burning coal has been turned into a nature reserve known as Portbury Ashlands.

== See also ==
- Bristol power stations
