= Tickenham, Nailsea and Kenn Moors SSSI =

Site on the North Somerset Levels, UK

Tickenham, Nailsea and Kenn Moors
- Site of Special Scientific Interest
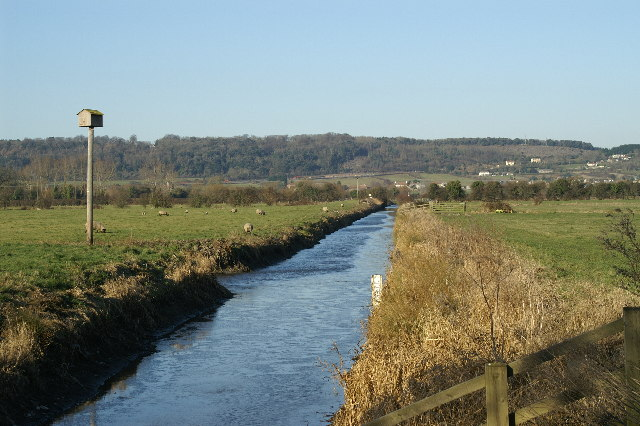

- Location within Somerset
- Location of Tickenham, Nailsea and Kenn Moors.
- Area of search: Avon
- Grid reference: ST440700
- Coordinates: 51.42623°N 2.80684°W
- Interest: Biological
- Area: 129.4 hectares (1.294 km^{2}; 0.500 sq mi)
- Notification date: 1995

Tickenham, Nailsea and Kenn Moors SSSI (grid reference ST440700) is a 129.4 hectare biological Site of Special Scientific Interest between Tickenham, Nailsea and Kenn on the North Somerset Levels, notified in 1995.

The soils in the area include both clays of the Allerton and Wentloog Series and peat soils of the Sedgemoor and Godney Series, which are drained by a network of large rhynes and smaller field ditches, which support exceptionally rich plant and invertebrate fauna communities. Exceptional populations of Coleoptera occur with at least 12 nationally scarce species and two nationally rare species, including Britain's largest water beetle the Great Silver Water Beetle (Hydrophilus piceus).

== See also ==
- Biddle Street, Yatton and Puxton Moor, two other similar SSSIs on the North Somerset Levels.
