= Weston Big Wood =

Woodland near Portishead, England

- Site of Special Scientific Interest
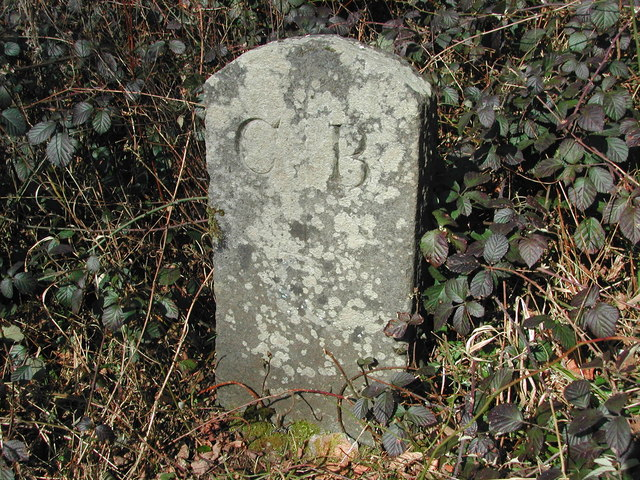
- One of the "CB" boundary markers found in the wood

- Location within Somerset
- Location of Weston Big Wood.
- Area of search: Avon
- Grid reference: ST455750
- Coordinates: 51.47133°N 2.78604°W
- Interest: Biological
- Area: 37.48 hectares (0.3748 km^{2}; 0.1447 sq mi)
- Notification date: 1971

Weston Big Wood (grid reference ST455750) is a 37.48 hectare woodland west of the town of Portishead, North Somerset, England. It is a nature reserve and biological Site of Special Scientific Interest, notified in 1971. The wood takes its name from the nearby village of Weston-in-Gordano.

== History ==
The wood itself dates at least from Iron Age times, with some evidence that there has been woodland here since trees began to recolonise after the last ice age some 10,000 years ago. Some of its internal features e.g. old stones, ditches and banks are thought to be medieval boundaries, dating from the Middle Ages and used to divide the wood into sectors.

More recently, after the manor of North Weston was sold to the City of Bristol in 1637, marker stones were placed to mark a boundary across the woodland. These stones, marked with C.B. (City of Bristol), remain in place and can be found by looking at the old OS maps of the 19th century.

Adjacent to the wood on its southern side is the dis-used Black Rock quarry. On the western side of the woodland, adjacent to Valley Road which runs through the Nightingale Valley, sits another disused quarry which now is the site for the local civic amenity site.

The woodland sits on a ridge of Carboniferous limestone.

== Flora ==
Slopes within the woodland are covered with small-leaved lime trees; oak and hazel are more common on flatter hilltop areas. Rare whitebeams are also dotted throughout the wood.

The rare plant purple gromwell is found at the site. Other flowers include; wood anemones, violets and bluebells. The presence of other plants such as herb paris and yellow archangel together with the purple gromwell, show that this wood is ancient.

== Fauna ==
There is a wide coppiced open area inside the wood, created as a butterfly feature as part of the reserve management work, called "The Ride". Butterflies such as the orange tip, speckled wood and purple hairstreak can be seen in the area in summer.

The birds commonly seen, include woodpecker, nuthatch, and tawny owl. Bats also roost in the trees, and the presence of many setts indicates a large badger population.

== Access and management ==
There are four main entry points to the woodland.

The first (at 51.471456,-2.790383) is from a minor road which leads north from the Portishead to Weston in Gordano road; just past the civic amenity site. It enters the north west side of the wood and leads up a set of steps to the main circular path through the woods. The second entrance (at 51.467293,-2.783898) leads past the old quarries along a pathway which leads along the south eastern side of the wood. The third entrance is off Underwood Road in Portishead (at 51.472967,-2.777782) and enters the eastern side of the wood. The final entrance (at 51.4750278, -2.7835127) is from the fields adjacent to the northern side of the woods. A circular walk has been marked out inside the wood.

An area of 38 hectares is managed as a nature reserve by Avon Wildlife Trust, and purchased with support from the Heritage Lottery Fund, the Countryside Agency, and donations from members and local people.

== Bibliography ==
- Myles, Sarah (2000) The Flora of the Bristol Region ISBN 1-874357-18-8
