= Walton in Gordano =

Village in Somerset, England

Coordinates: 51.4545°N 2.8283°W

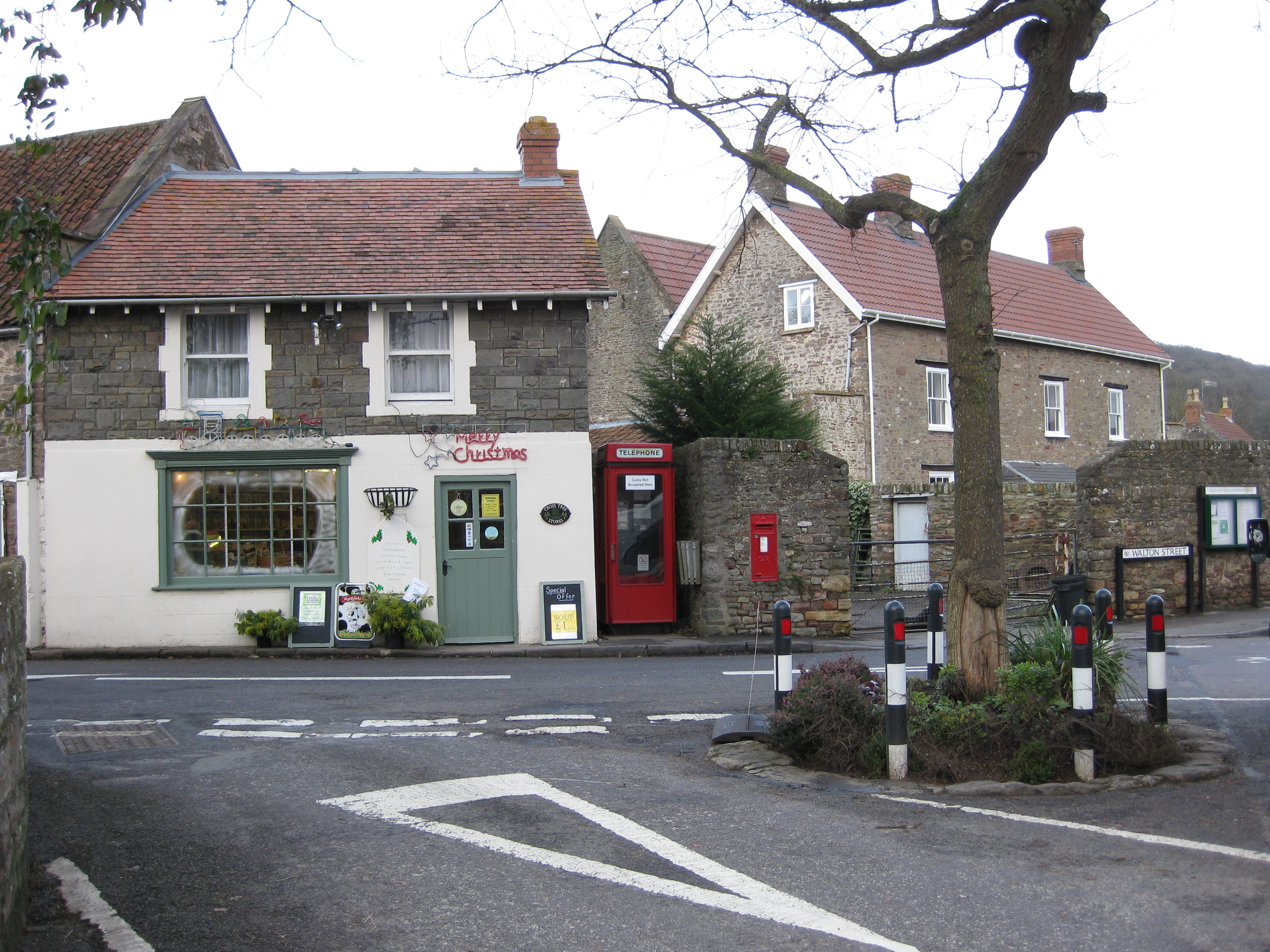
- The village shop and main road junction in Walton in Gordano

- Location within Somerset
- Population: 273
- OS grid reference: ST430730
- Civil parish: Walton-in-Gordano
- Unitary authority: North Somerset
- Ceremonial county: Somerset
- Region: South West
- Country: England
- Sovereign state: United Kingdom
- Post town: CLEVEDON
- Postcode district: BS21
- Dialling code: 01275
- Police: Avon and Somerset
- Fire: Avon
- Ambulance: South Western
- UK Parliament: North Somerset

Walton in Gordano is a village and civil parish in the North Somerset district, in the ceremonial county of Somerset, England. It is situated in a small valley at the side of the south-western end of the Gordano Valley, about a mile from Clevedon. In 2011 the parish had a population of 273.

== History ==
The parish of Walton was part of the Portbury Hundred.

== Governance ==
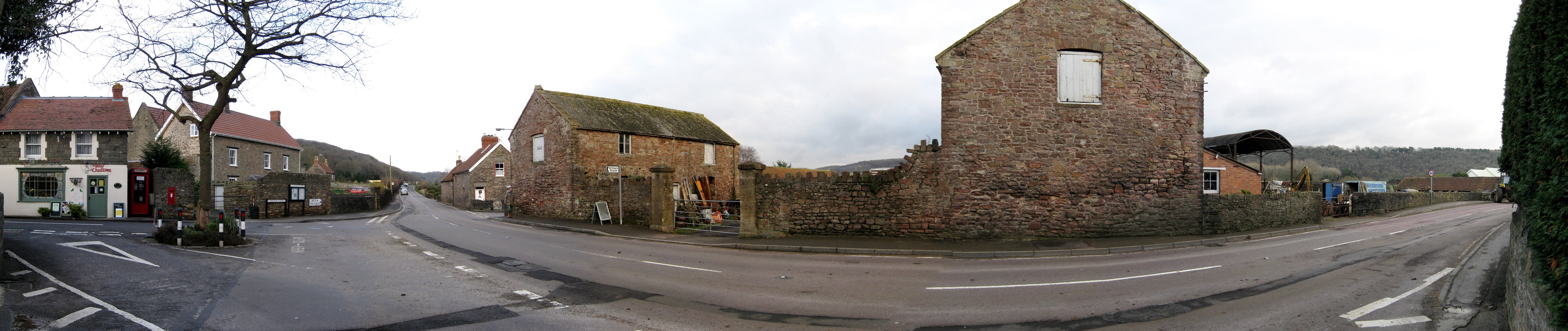
Panoramic view of the centre of the village

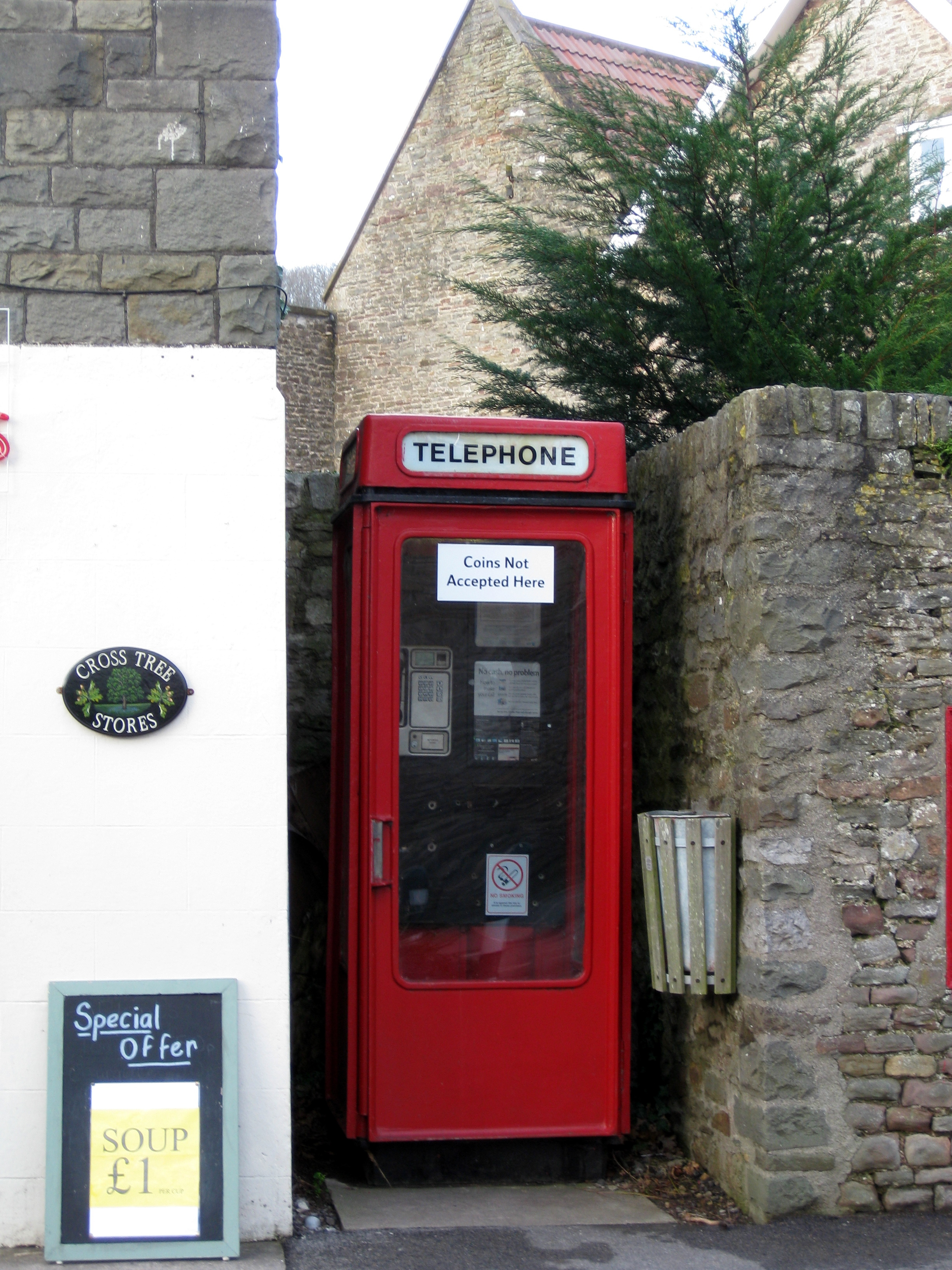
A rare K8 telephone box (removed as of March 2021)

The parish council has responsibility for local issues, including setting an annual precept (local rate) to cover the council's operating costs and producing annual accounts for public scrutiny. The parish council evaluates local planning applications and works with the local police, district council officers, and neighbourhood watch groups on matters of crime, security, and traffic. The parish council's role also includes initiating projects for the maintenance and repair of parish facilities, such as the village hall or community centre, playing fields and playgrounds, as well as consulting with the district council on the maintenance, repair, and improvement of highways, drainage, footpaths, public transport, and street cleaning. Conservation matters (including trees and listed buildings) and environmental issues are also of interest to the council.

The parish falls within the unitary authority of North Somerset which was created in 1996, as established by the Local Government Act 1992. It provides a single tier of local government with responsibility for almost all local government functions within its area including local planning and building control, local roads, council housing, environmental health, markets and fairs, refuse collection, recycling, cemeteries, crematoria, leisure services, parks, and tourism. It is also responsible for education, social services, libraries, main roads, public transport, Trading Standards, waste disposal and strategic planning, although fire, police and ambulance services are provided jointly with other authorities through the Avon Fire and Rescue Service, Avon and Somerset Constabulary and the South Western Ambulance Service.

North Somerset's area covers part of the ceremonial county of Somerset but it is administered independently of the non-metropolitan county. Its administrative headquarters is in the town hall in Weston-super-Mare. Between 1 April 1974 and 1 April 1996, it was the Woodspring district of the county of Avon. Before 1974 that the parish was part of the Long Ashton Rural District. The parish is represented in the House of Commons of the Parliament of the United Kingdom as part of the North Somerset constituency. It elects one member of parliament by the first past the post system of election, currently Sadik Al-Hassan of the Labour Party, since 4th July 2024.

== Landmarks ==
On the hill to the south-west between Walton and Clevedon is Walton Castle, a hunting lodge, dating from the fifteenth century. It is privately owned but available for hire for weddings and conferences. Clevedon Court is approximately 2 miles away and is owned by the National Trust. It has been designated by English Heritage as a Grade I listed building.

The manor house dates from around 1700.

== Geography ==
On the hill to the north-east is Walton Common, a nature reserve managed by the Avon Wildlife Trust. The Common is both a Scheduled Ancient Monument and a biological Site of Special Scientific Interest. It contains the Walton Common banjo enclosure, built in the Iron Age. The Common is covered by a Countryside Stewardship agreement with the Countryside Agency. It remains in private ownership and the Avon Wildlife Trust has a 10-year lease to manage it as a nature reserve.

Wildflowers found on the common include thyme, marjoram, rock-rose, St John's wort, autumn gentian and violets. Butterflies are particularly notable including common blue, brown argus, grizzled and dingy skipper, green and purple hairstreak, and dark green fritillary. Other insects such as grasshoppers, glow-worms and moths are abundant. Birds identified at the site include; blackcap, whitethroat, buzzard, kestrel and sparrowhawk.

== Religious sites ==
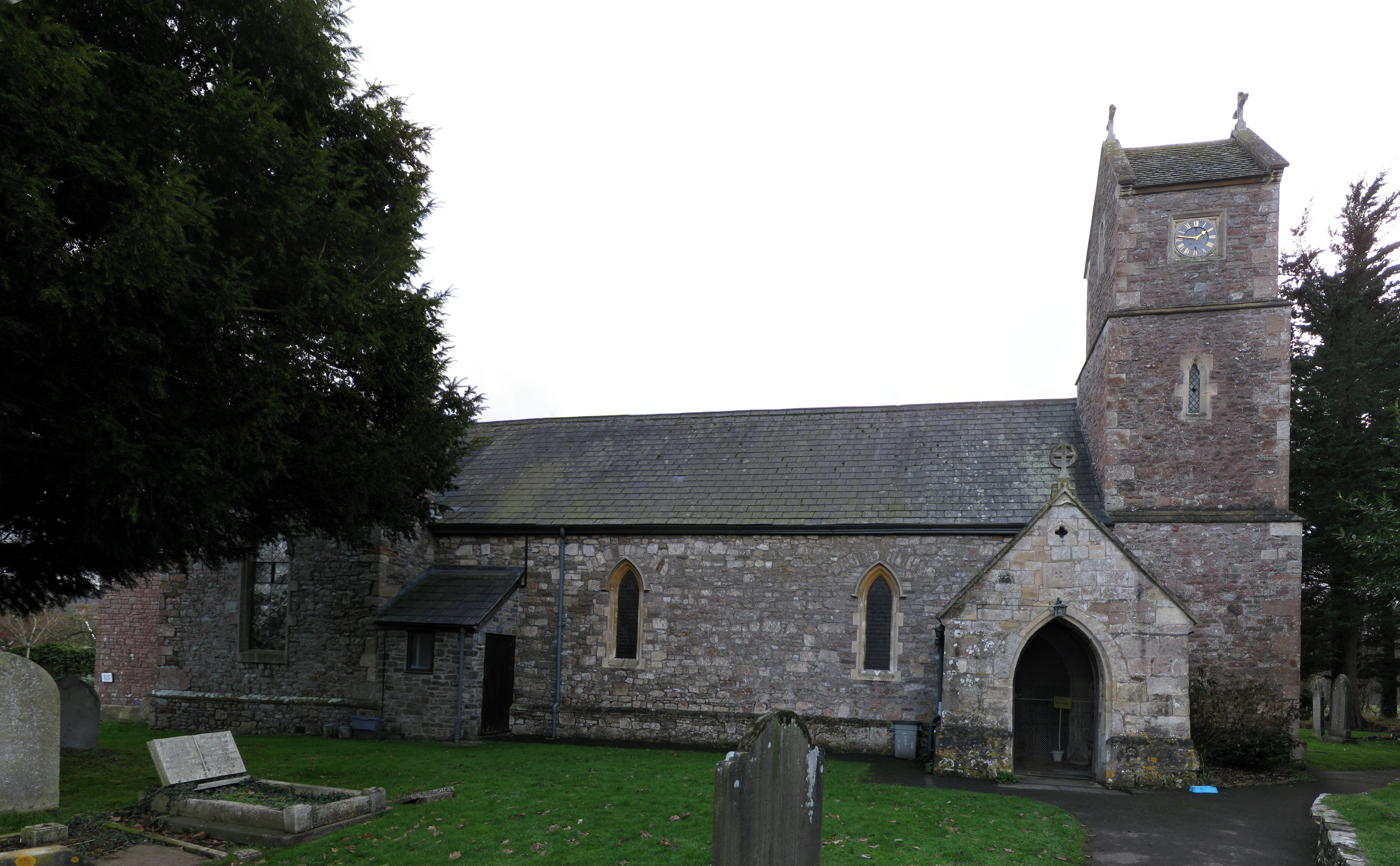
Church of St Paul, Walton in Gordano

The Church of SS Peter & Paul Weston in Gordano, a nearby village, has been designated as a Grade I listed building. The tower and porch were built around 1300, while the rest of the building is from the 15th century, with the work being funded by Sir Richard Percival who died in 1483 and whose tomb is in the north isle of the nave.

The parish church of Walton in Gordano is dedicated to St. Paul. It was built in 1839 on the site of a previous church.

== Notable people ==
Geoff Barrow from the influential and critically acclaimed trip hop group Portishead was born in Walton in Gordano and lived there until he was 11 when he moved to nearby Portishead.
