= Clapton in Gordano =

Village in Somerset, England

Coordinates: 51.462°N 2.758°W

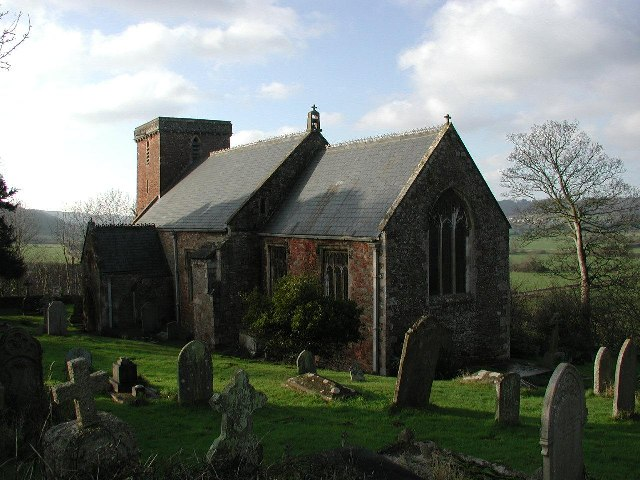
- St Michael's Church

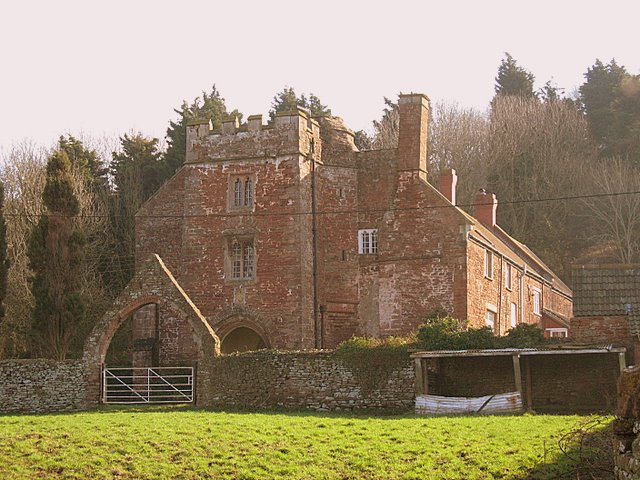
- Clapton Court

- Location within Somerset
- Population: 348 (2011)
- OS grid reference: ST475740
- Unitary authority: North Somerset
- Ceremonial county: Somerset
- Region: South West
- Country: England
- Sovereign state: United Kingdom
- Post town: BRISTOL
- Postcode district: BS20
- Dialling code: 01275
- Police: Avon and Somerset
- Fire: Avon
- Ambulance: South Western
- UK Parliament: North Somerset

Clapton in Gordano is a village and civil parish in Somerset, England. It is situated within the unitary authority of North Somerset on the southern side of the Gordano Valley, immediately adjacent to the M5 motorway. The parish has a population of 348. There is a village football club, Clapton in Gordano FC. They currently run two sides with a view to continue progressing throughout the leagues. Their home ground is currently Clapton Lane, Portishead.

== History ==
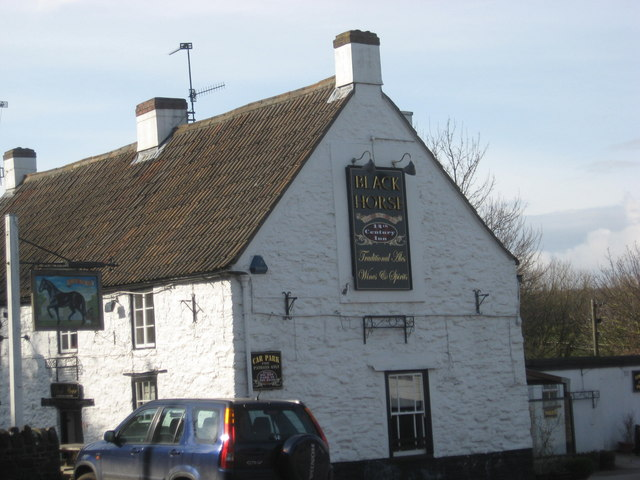
The Black Horse Inn.

The name Gordano comes from Old English and is descriptive of the triangular shape of the whole valley from Clevedon to Portishead, being the ablative singular of the Latinised form of Gorden meaning muddy valley.

Roman coin hoards have been discovered in Clapton. The first discovery was in 1891 when 35 'third bras' coins were found at the top of Tickenham Hill. The second hoard of about 3500 bronze coins was discovered between 1922 and 1924 in a field between the church and the rectory. Some of the coins are in the Museum of Somerset while the majority were sold to the Nicholson Museum in Australia in 1949.

The parish of Clapton was part of the Portbury Hundred.

Coal was mined in the area in the 17th and 18th centuries.

Half a mile west of the village is a manor house (now a farm). Another notable historic building in the village is The Black Horse pub, a 17th-century inn and former magistrate's jail.

Sperrings Farm with its 500-year-old listed farmhouse is situated on the outskirts of the village.

== Governance ==
The parish council has responsibility for local issues, including setting an annual precept (local rate) to cover the council’s operating costs and producing annual accounts for public scrutiny. The parish council evaluates local planning applications and works with the local police, district council officers, and neighbourhood watch groups on matters of crime, security, and traffic. The parish council's role also includes initiating projects for the maintenance and repair of parish facilities, such as playgrounds and dog fouling, as well as consulting with the district council on the maintenance, repair, and improvement of highways, drainage, footpaths, public transport, and street cleaning. Conservation matters (including trees and listed buildings) and environmental issues are also of interest to the council.

The parish falls within the unitary authority of North Somerset which was created in 1996, as established by the Local Government Act 1992. It provides a single tier of local government with responsibility for almost all local government functions within its area including local planning and building control, local roads, council housing, environmental health, markets and fairs, refuse collection, recycling, cemeteries, crematoria, leisure services, parks, and tourism. It is also responsible for education, social services, libraries, main roads, public transport, trading standards, waste disposal and strategic planning, although fire, police and ambulance services are provided jointly with other authorities through the Avon Fire and Rescue Service, Avon and Somerset Constabulary and the South Western Ambulance Service.

North Somerset's area covers part of the ceremonial county of Somerset but it is administered independently of the non-metropolitan county. Its administrative headquarters are in the town hall in Weston-super-Mare. Between 1 April 1974 and 1 April 1996, it was the Woodspring district of the county of Avon. Before 1974 that the parish was part of the Long Ashton Rural District.

The village falls in 'Gordano' electoral ward. The ward stretches from the east side of Portishead through Clapton in Gordano to Tickenham. The total ward population taken at the 2011 census was 4,315.

The parish is represented in the House of Commons of the Parliament of the United Kingdom as part of the North Somerset constituency. It elects one Member of Parliament (MP) by the first past the post system of election, currently Liam Fox of the Conservative Party. It was also part of the South West England constituency of the European Parliament prior to Britain leaving the European Union in January 2020, which elected seven MEPs using the d'Hondt method of party-list proportional representation.

== Geography ==
Near the village is Clapton Moor, 40 hectares of grassland owned and managed by the Avon Wildlife Trust.

== Religious sites ==
The 13th century church is dedicated to St Michael.

== Landmarks ==
Clapton court was a mansion house and then a farmhouse. The northern elevation dates from the 15th century with the rest of the building dating from the 17th and 19th centuries. It has been designated as a Grade II listed building. In 2009 planning permission was gained to demolish some of the farm buildings and convert others into holiday homes and offices.

== Notable residents ==
- Sir Edward Payson Wills, 1st Baronet (1834–1910), Tobacco manufacturer and a director of W.D. & H.O. Wills Tobacco Company, whose country seat was Clapton Court, and was a church warden of Saint Michael's Church.
