= Weston in Gordano =

Village in Somerset, England

Coordinates: 51.4640°N 2.7911°W

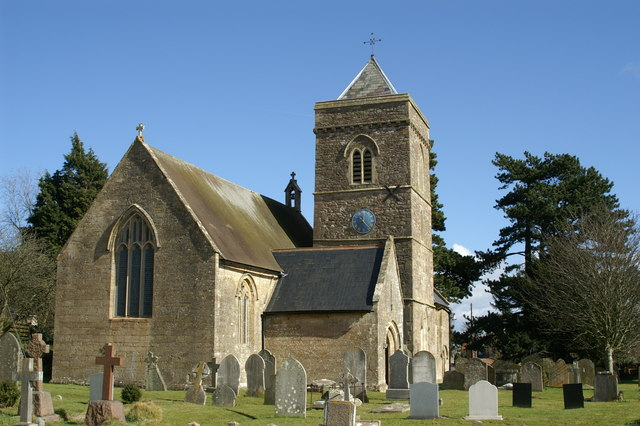
- Church of SS Peter & Paul, Weston in Gordano

- Location within Somerset
- Population: 301 (2011)
- OS grid reference: ST450742
- Civil parish: Weston-in-Gordano
- Unitary authority: North Somerset
- Ceremonial county: Somerset
- Region: South West
- Country: England
- Sovereign state: United Kingdom
- Post town: BRISTOL
- Postcode district: BS20
- Dialling code: 01275
- Police: Avon and Somerset
- Fire: Avon
- Ambulance: South Western
- UK Parliament: North Somerset

Weston in Gordano is a village and civil parish in the North Somerset district, in the ceremonial county of Somerset, England. It is situated in the middle of the Gordano valley on the north side, and in the Unitary Authority of North Somerset, on the road between Clevedon and Portishead. In 2011 the parish had a population of 301.

It is the largest village in the valley, with a public house, the 18th century White Hart, and a garage.

== History ==
The parish of Weston was part of the Portbury hundred.

== Governance ==
The parish council has responsibility for local issues, including setting an annual precept (local rate) to cover the council's operating costs and producing annual accounts for public scrutiny. The parish council evaluates local planning applications and works with the local police, district council officers, and neighbourhood watch groups on matters of crime, security, and traffic. The parish council's role also includes initiating projects for the maintenance and repair of parish facilities, such as the village hall or community centre, playing fields and playgrounds, as well as consulting with the district council on the maintenance, repair, and improvement of highways, drainage, footpaths, public transport, and street cleaning. Conservation matters (including trees and listed buildings) and environmental issues are also of interest to the council.

The parish falls within the unitary authority area of North Somerset which became a unitary authority in 1996, as established by the Local Government Act 1992. It provides a single tier of local government with responsibility for almost all local government functions within its area including local planning and building control, local roads, council housing, environmental health, markets and fairs, refuse collection, recycling, cemeteries, crematoria, leisure services, parks, and tourism. It is also responsible for education, social services, libraries, main roads, public transport, Trading Standards, waste disposal and strategic planning, although fire, police and ambulance services are provided jointly with other authorities through the Avon Fire and Rescue Service, Avon and Somerset Constabulary and the South Western Ambulance Service.

North Somerset's area covers part of the ceremonial county of Somerset but it is administered independently of the non-metropolitan county. Between 1 April 1974 and 1 April 1996, it was the Woodspring district of the county of Avon which was renamed North Somerset in 1996. Before 1974 that the parish was part of the Long Ashton Rural District.

The parish is represented in the House of Commons of the Parliament of the United Kingdom as part of the North Somerset constituency. It elects one Member of Parliament (MP) by the first past the post system of election, currently Liam Fox of the Conservative Party. It was also part of the South West England constituency of the European Parliament prior to Britain leaving the European Union in January 2020, which elected seven MEPs using the d'Hondt method of party-list proportional representation.

== Geography ==
There are two nearby nature reserves, both owned and managed by the Avon Wildlife Trust. Weston Big Wood is 38 hectares of ancient woodland, and Weston Moor is 59 hectares of wet grassland. Weston Big Wood falls within a wider biological Site of Special Scientific Interest. The wood itself dates at least from Iron Age times, with some evidence that there has been woodland here since trees began to recolonise after the last ice age some 10,000 years ago. Some of its internal features e.g. old stones, ditches and banks are thought to be medieval boundaries, dating from the Middle Ages and used to divide the wood into sectors. Adjacent to the wood on its southern side is a large quarry. The woodland sits on a ridge of Carboniferous Limestone, and its slopes are covered with small-leaved lime trees; oak and hazel are more common on flatter hilltop areas. Rare whitebeams are also dotted throughout the wood. The rare plant purple gromwell is found at the site. Other flowers include; wood anemones, violets and bluebells. The presence of other plants such as herb paris and yellow archangel together with the purple gromwell, show that this wood is ancient. There is a wide coppiced open area inside the wood, created as a butterfly feature as part of the reserve management work, called "The Ride". Butterflies such as the orange tip, speckled wood and purple hairstreak can be seen in the area in summer. The birds commonly seen, include woodpecker, nuthatch, and tawny owl. Bats also roost in the trees, and the presence of many setts indicates a large badger population. Middle Hill Common is an area of grassland and wild flower meadow, which supports invertebrates and butterflies.

Weston-in-Gordano SSSI is a geological Site of Special Scientific Interest and Geological Conservation Review site because temporary exposures here have shown Pleistocene sediments, including interglacial fluvial sands and marine gravels and cold-stage fluvial gravels. Rich molluscan faunas have been reported from the section. The presence of freshwater and marine interglacial deposits gives it great potential importance for the understanding of the Quaternary sequence of the Vale of Gordano and Avonmouth lowlands.

== Religious sites ==
The parish Church of SS Peter & Paul has a tower and porch which were built around 1300, while the rest of the building is from the 15th century. It has been designated as a Grade I listed building.
