= Walton Common =

Protected area in Somerset, England

- Site of Special Scientific Interest
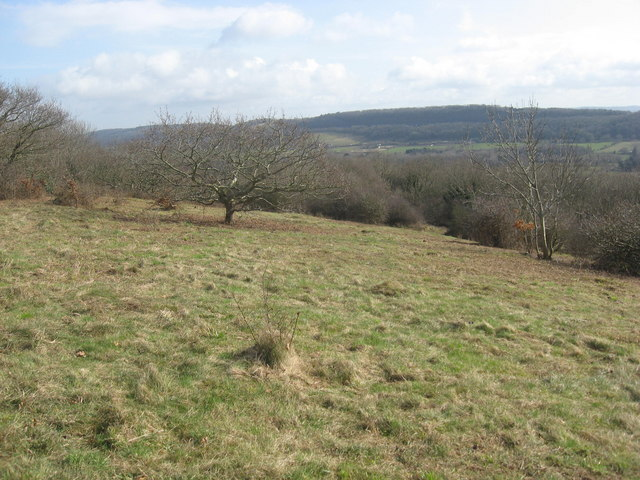

- Location within Somerset
- Location of Walton Common.
- Area of search: Avon
- Grid reference: ST428738
- Coordinates: 51.46027°N 2.82471°W
- Interest: Biological
- Area: 25.5 hectares (0.255 km^{2}; 0.098 sq mi)
- Notification date: 1991

Walton Common (grid reference ST428738) is a 25.5 hectare biological Site of Special Scientific Interest (SSSI) near the village of Walton in Gordano, North Somerset, notified in 1991.

The common, which is both a Scheduled Ancient Monument and an SSSI, is covered by a Countryside Stewardship agreement with the Countryside Agency. It remains in private ownership, but the Avon Wildlife Trust has a 10-year lease to manage it as a nature reserve. The site has two saucer-shaped round barrows from the Bronze Age, and the Walton Common banjo enclosure, a banjo enclosure from the late Iron Age that may be a univallate hillfort, with associated fields.

Wildflowers found on the common include thyme, marjoram, rock-rose, St John's wort, autumn gentian and violets. Butterflies are particularly notable including common blue, brown argus, grizzled and dingy skipper, green and purple hairstreak, and dark green fritillary. Other insects such as grasshoppers, glow-worms and moths are abundant. Birds identified at the site include; blackcap, whitethroat, buzzard, kestrel and sparrowhawk.
