= Rhyne =

Drainage ditch

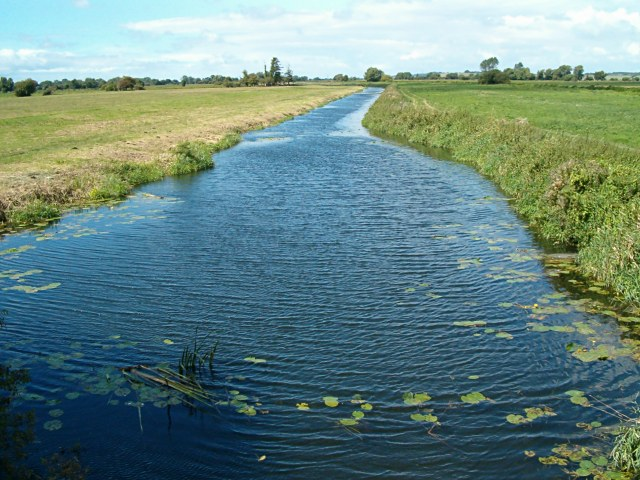
Langacre Rhyne near West End, North Somerset.

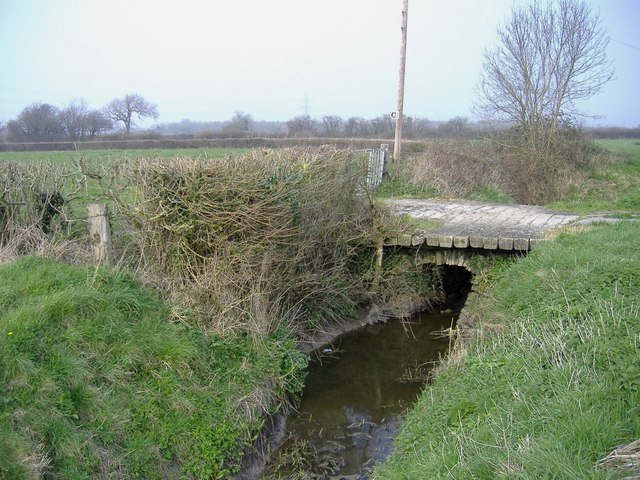
Olveston Drainage Rhine near Pilning, South Gloucestershire.

A rhyne (Somerset), rhine/rhyne (Gloucestershire), or reen (South Wales) (all pronounced /ˈriːn/ "reen"; from Old English ryne or Welsh rhewyn or rhewin "ditch") is a drainage ditch, or canal, used to turn areas of wetland close to sea level into useful pasture. Water levels will usually be controlled by a system of sluice gates and pumps. Rhynes have been used extensively in the United Kingdom.

== Etymology ==
The spelling of the term varies, though all terms are pronounced /ˈriːn/, which comes from terms for ditch in Old English (ryne) or Welsh (rhewyn or rhewin). The term is rhyne in Somerset, rhine or rhyne in Gloucestershire, and reen in South Wales. The etymology of the name is unclear. Some sources claim that rhyne is derived from the Irish word rathin, a diminutive of rath —a circular mound or entrenchment. The word rhewyn is attested in Welsh from the 1400s onwards.

== Description ==
=== Purpose of rhyne ===
A rhyne is a drainage ditch, or canal, used to turn areas of wetland close to sea level into useful pasture.

=== Water level control ===
Water levels (and hence the level of the water table) will usually be controlled by a system of sluice gates and pumps, allowing the land to become wetter at times of the year when this will improve grass growth. Rhynes represent an early method of swamp or marsh drainage. Large sections of swampland were surrounded by trenches deep enough to drain the water from the encircled mound and leave the land relatively dry. Regular clearing and dredging is necessary to keep the rhynes clear of debris so that they flow freely.

== Examples of rhynes ==
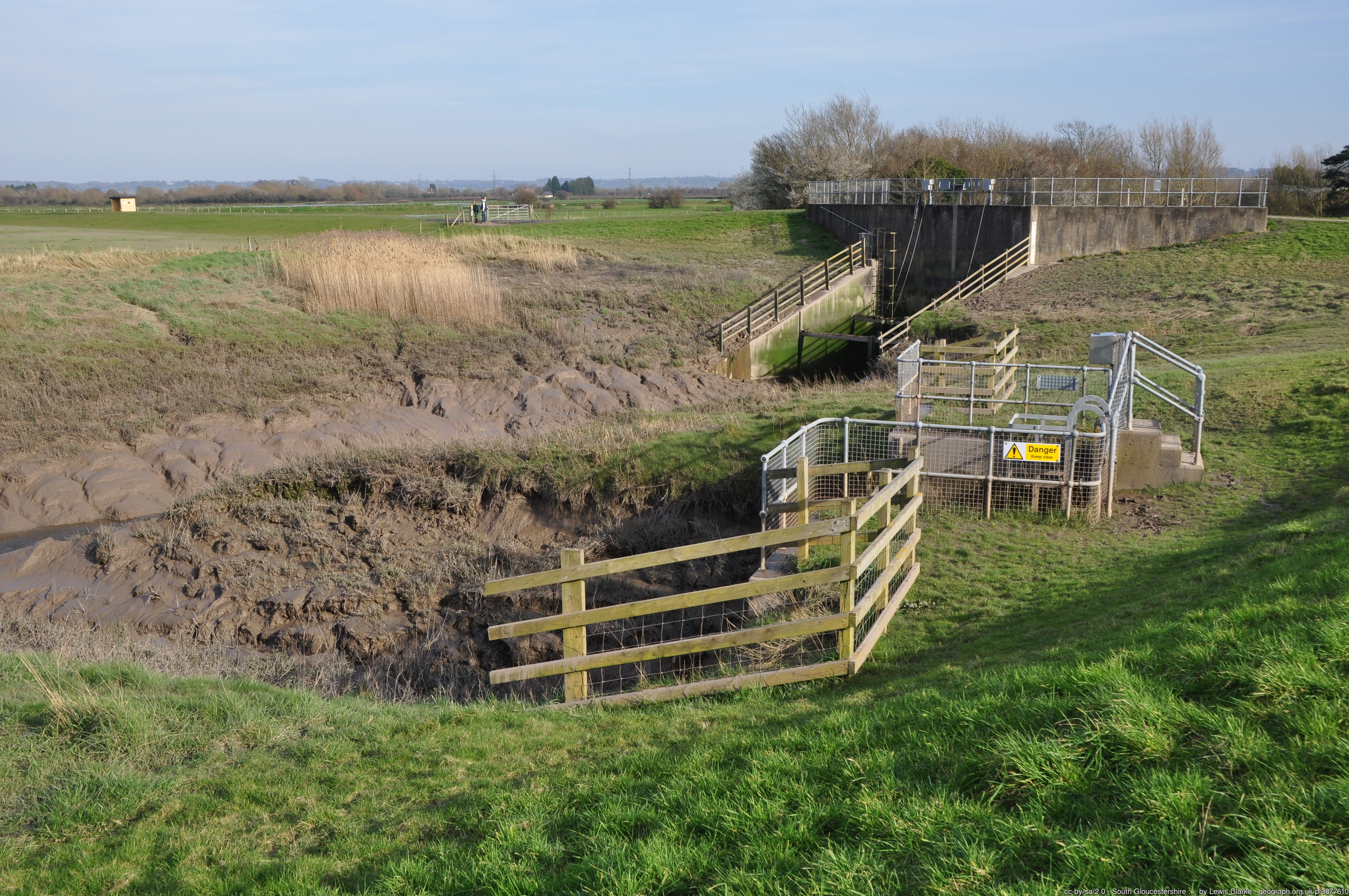
A sluice used to manage the Chessell Pill where it drains into the Severn Estuary near New Passage, South Gloucestershire.

Rhynes have been used extensively in the United Kingdom, especially on marshy coastal areas such as the Somerset Levels, and the North Somerset Levels. Other examples in England exist in the Framilode and Saul area of Gloucestershire, where they drain into either the River Severn or Sharpness Canal, and the Pilning Levels alongside the Severn Estuary in South Gloucestershire between Avonmouth and Aust. In southeast Wales, they can be found on the Caldicot and Wentloog Levels. Many of them are still in use today.

Many rhynes in England and Wales are maintained as part of the water resource management operations of internal drainage boards. The rhynes near Wembdon village have some early references, including Fichet's rhyne in 1579 and the Great or Wildmarsh rhyne in 1705.

== See also ==
- Water channels
  - Canal
  - Ditch
  - List of canals by country
- Hydraulic engineering
  - Gatehouse (waterworks) – An (elaborate) structure to house a sluice gate
  - Floodgate
  - Water locks
    - Lock
    - Control lock
