= Adam baronets of Hankelow Court (1917) =

Forbes Adam baronets
- Escutcheon of the Adam baronets of Hankelow Court
- Creation date: 1917
- Status: extant
- Motto: Crux Mihi Grata Quies (The cross gives me welcome rest)
- Arms: Argent a mullet pierced between three cross crosslets fitchee Gules a chief of the last thereon a pale Or charged with a rose of the second barbed and seeded Proper
- Crest: A cubit arm Argent holding in the hand a cross crosslet fitchee in bend sinister and charged on the wrist with a rose both as in the arms

The Adam, later Forbes Adam baronetcy, of Hankelow Court in the County of Chester, was created in the Baronetage of the United Kingdom on 15 February 1917 for the industrialist and banker Frank Adam.

His eldest son the 2nd Baronet was a General in the British Army. He was succeeded by his nephew the 3rd Baronet, son of Eric Forbes Adam, second son of the 1st Baronet. The 4th Baronet was the eldest son of Colin Forbes Adam, third son of the 1st Baronet.

== Adam, later Forbes Adam baronets of Hankelow Court (1917) ==
- Sir Frank Forbes Adam, 1st Baronet (1846–1926)
- Sir Ronald Forbes Adam, 2nd Baronet (1885–1982)
- Sir Christopher Eric Forbes Adam, 3rd Baronet (1920–2009)
- The Revd Sir (Stephen) Timothy Forbes Adam, 4th Baronet (1923–2019)
- Sir Nigel Colin Forbes Adam, 5th Baronet (1930–2022)
- Sir Charles David Forbes Adam, 6th Baronet (born 1957)

The heir apparent is the present holder's son Crispin Beilby Forbes Adam (born 1987).
