= Ronald Adam (British Army officer) =

British Army general (1885–1982)

General Sir Ronald Adam Bt GCB DSO OBE
- 1940 portrait
- Born: 30 October 1885; Bombay, India
- Died: 26 December 1982 (aged 97); Faygate, Sussex, England
- Burial place: Rusper, Sussex, England
- Military career
- Allegiance: United Kingdom
- Branch: British Army
- Service years: 1905–1946
- Rank: General
- Nickname: "Bill"
- Service number: 1632
- Units: Royal Field Artillery; Royal Artillery
- Commands: Northern Command; III Corps; Staff College, Camberley
- Conflicts: First World War: Western Front; Italian Front; Second World War: Battle of France
- Awards: Knight Grand Cross of the Order of the Bath; Companion of the Distinguished Service Order; Officer of the Order of the British Empire; Mentioned in Despatches (4); Legion of Merit (US)

General Sir Ronald Forbes Adam, 2nd Baronet, GCB, DSO, OBE (30 October 1885 – 26 December 1982) was a senior British Army officer. He had an important influence on the conduct of the British Army during the Second World War as a result of his long tenure as Adjutant-General, responsible for the army's organisation and personnel, from June 1941 until the end of the war, and as a close confidant of Field Marshal Sir Alan Brooke, the Chief of the Imperial General Staff (CIGS), the professional head of the British Army.

A graduate of Eton College and the Royal Military Academy Woolwich, Adam was commissioned on 27 July 1905 into the Royal Artillery. After a posting to India with the Royal Horse Artillery, he served on the Western Front and the Italian Front during the First World War. After the war he attended the Staff College, Camberley, and held successively senior staff postings at the War Office. He was an instructor at the Staff College between 1932 and 1935, and was briefly its commandant in 1937. When Lord Gort became CIGS, Adam was made Deputy Chief of the Imperial General Staff (DCIGS). In October 1939, he was appointed commander of III Corps. When, in late May 1940, the BEF was ordered to evacuate France, Adam was given the task of organising the Dunkirk perimeter. Following his return from France on 31 May 1940, Adam was appointed General Officer Commanding-in-Chief Northern Command, responsible for the defence of the coastline from The Wash to the Scottish border.

In June 1941 he was appointed Adjutant-General. The role was of particular importance during the war years because of the need for the army to adapt its practices to meet the needs of a conscript army led by non-career officers. He set up a personnel selection department that drew up aptitude tests to establish recruits' psychological stability, combatant temperament, technical aptitudes and leadership potential. Under Adam's guidance, officer selection was no longer based on a simple interview by commanding officers, but carried out through a War Office Selection Board ("Wozbee") whose members, advised by psychiatrists and psychologists, oversaw various tests, especially those aimed at showing a man's initiative potential. Adam did not accept the traditional view that there was an officer-producing class, but believed that men and women of ability could be found in all parts of the community. Both these innovations met resistance.

So too did Adam's proposal to create a Corps of Infantry. This alarmed traditionalists at the War Office, who blocked it. However, Adam managed to then push through another reform creating the General Service Corps (GSC). All recruits—some 710,000 between July 1942 and May 1945— were initially posted to the GSC for the period of their basic training, after which they were sent to a training centre for specialised training. Even more controversial was Adam's championing of the Army Bureau of Current Affairs (ABCA), which produced fortnightly pamphlets on current developments to provide officers with material for compulsory discussion groups with their men. He and other senior officers believed that a citizen army had to be encouraged into battle, not just ordered. The leftward swing in British public opinion during the war years that resulted in a landslide win for the Labour Party in the 1945 general election was blamed on the ABCA. As the end of the war approached, Adam instituted a demobilisation system based on the "first in, first out" principle, and he resisted attempts to repeat the practice in 1918–19 of giving priority to the needs of the economy, which had led to mutinies by long-serving men. After the war he retired from the Army in October 1946, and was the chairman of several bodies involved in adult education.

== Early life ==
Ronald Forbes Adam was born in Bombay, India, on 30 October 1885, the eldest child of Frank Forbes Adam, a merchant, and his wife Rose Frances Kemball, the daughter of Charles Gurdon Kemball, a judge of the High Court of Bombay. His father was a prominent businessman and a member of the Bombay Legislative Council who was made a Companion of the Order of the Indian Empire in 1888, was knighted in 1890, and was created Baronet of Hankelow Court in Cheshire in 1917. He had two younger brothers, Eric Forbes Adam and Colin Forbes Adam, and a younger sister, Hetty Reay Clifford Forbes Adam. Because infant mortality was high in India, he was sent to England to live with relatives when he was three years old. The rest of the family followed the next year, settling in Hankelow Court. Adam was educated at Fonthill Preparatory School in East Grinstead, Sussex, and then at Eton College from September 1898 to December 1902. Setting his sights on a military career, he attended Adams and Millard, a cram school in Freiberg, Germany, in 1903, to study for the entrance examination to the Royal Military Academy, Woolwich. He passed, ranked 33rd out of 39, and graduated in 1905, still ranked 33rd out of 39 in his class.

Adam was commissioned as a second lieutenant in the Royal Field Artillery on 27 July 1905. A month of further instruction followed at the Royal Artillery School of Gunnery at Shoeburyness in Essex, and four more at the Ordnance College at Woolwich, after which he was posted to the 54th Battery, 39th Field Artillery Brigade, based at Shorncliffe Army Camp in Kent. After three years there, the regiment moved to Edinburgh. Parades and drill took up the mornings; in the afternoons he went horse riding, and played rugby, cricket, polo, hockey, golf and billiards. He was promoted to lieutenant on 27 July 1908. In May 1911, he embarked for India, where he joined N Troop, Royal Horse Artillery, at Ambala. Alan Brooke, "a man that would become a lifelong comrade-in-arms and friend", was a fellow officer in the troop. Although Adam was known in the Army by his nickname of "Bill", Brooke, for obscure reasons, always referred to him as "George". On home leave in 1913, he met and became engaged to Anna Dorothy Pitman, the daughter of Frederick I. Pitman, a rower and financier.

== First World War ==
Four days after Britain's declaration of war on Germany on 5 August 1914, N Troop was alerted to prepare to move to join the British Expeditionary Force in France. It sailed from Bombay on 9 September, via the Suez Canal and Marseille, and reached the front on 5 November. He was promoted to captain on 30 October 1914, and married Dorothy, who was serving with a Voluntary Aid Detachment, on 7 January 1915. Adam became second-in-command of the 41st Battery, 42nd Brigade, Royal Field Artillery in March 1915, adjutant of the 3rd Brigade, Royal Field Artillery in July, and commander of the 58th Battery, 35th Brigade, Royal Field Artillery in October. He was evacuated to England suffering with trench fever in September 1916. While convalescing, he was promoted to major on 14 November 1916.

When he recovered, he was appointed commander of the 464th Battery, 174th Brigade, Royal Field Artillery, in January 1917. He took it to the Western Front on 12 May. In November, Adam was in command of F Battery, Royal Horse Artillery when it was ordered to the Italian Front. He remained there for the rest of the war, becoming brigade major of the XIV Corps in March 1918, and then of the 23rd Division in April. He was appointed a Companion of the Distinguished Service Order in the 1918 Birthday Honours, appointed an Officer of the Order of the British Empire in the 1919 Birthday Honours, and thrice mentioned in despatches.

Adam had four children, all daughters: Barbara in 1917, Margot in 1918, and twins Bridget Islay and Isobel in 1927. The middle name "Forbes", originally a common family second name, was now used as an unhyphenated double family surname.

== Between the wars ==
After the war, Adam was posted to No. 5 District, Aldershot Command as a brigade major. In 1920, he was sent to the Staff College, Camberley. After graduating the following year, he was briefly posted to Woolwich, and then to the War Office as a General Staff Officer (Grade 3) (GSO3). He then returned to Camberley as an instructor, with the acting rank of lieutenant colonel. In March 1926, he assumed command of the 72nd Battery, 16th Brigade, Royal Artillery, which was stationed at Kirkee in India. He became a brevet lieutenant colonel in July 1926, and inherited the Baronetcy of Hankelow Court in the County of Chester as 2nd Baronet Forbes Adam on the death of his father on 22 December 1926. He was promoted to colonel on 9 October 1932, with seniority backdated to 1 July 1930. In December, he returned to the War Office as a General Staff Officer (Grade 2) (GSO2). He attended the Imperial Defence College in 1930. After nine months in command of the 13th Field Brigade at Woolwich in 1932, he served as an instructor at Camberley until 1935. Other instructors there at this time included Lord Gort, Bernard Montgomery, Philip Neame, Bernard Paget and Andrew Thorne. He was then posted back to the War Office again as a General Staff Officer (Grade 1) (GSO1) in the Directorate of Military Operations and Intelligence, becoming deputy director of Military Operations (DDMO) with the temporary rank of brigadier when the directorate was reorganised on 1 October 1936.

Adam was appointed Commander, Royal Artillery (CRA) for the 1st Division on 14 November 1936, retaining his acting rank of brigadier. The 1st Division was sent to Shanghai in 1937, but the artillery remained behind. On 24 September 1937, he received the prestigious posting of Commandant of the Staff College, Camberley, with the temporary rank of major general, vice Gort, who became Military Secretary. Both appointments were instigated by the new Secretary of State for War, Leslie Hore-Belisha, who attempted to put his stamp on the Army by appointing younger officers to key positions. To replace Field Marshal Sir Cyril Deverell as Chief of the Imperial General Staff (CIGS), Hore-Belisha considered Adam, Gort and Frederick Pile, all of whom were aged 52 or 53. He decided to appoint Gort, who had been conferred the Victoria Cross and was a Companion of the Distinguished Service Order with two bars, and would make a fine public face of the Army. He was concerned, though, about the ability of Gort, a man of action but not particularly cerebral, to push through reforms that he felt were urgently needed for a war that he felt was just around the corner. Basil Liddell Hart then suggested that he revive the post of Deputy Chief of the Imperial General Staff (DCIGS), and give it to Adam, "to be the thinking head whilst Gort provided the drive."

Adam took up the new position on 3 January 1938, with the temporary rank of lieutenant general, although he remained only a substantive colonel. This was changed when his substantive rank was made a major general, backdated to 18 December 1937. There were important differences of opinion on policy and strategy between the Army and the government concerning the nature of the war and how it would be fought. The Army staff thought in terms of a field army that could be sent to France, as in 1914. The government saw this as preparing for the last war. It considered that the French Army was invulnerable behind the Maginot Line, and therefore the Germans would most likely attempt to knock Britain out of the war by attacking its industry and commerce. The emphasis was therefore placed on building up Anti-Aircraft Command, and creating mobile units for service in the Middle East. Adam concentrated on matters of organisation, particularly of the infantry, armour, and artillery. Simple changes like getting the infantry to march in three lines instead of four to save road space encountered stiff opposition, as did proposals to mechanise the cavalry, which only got as far as combining cavalry regiments which had mechanised with the Royal Tank Corps (renamed Royal Tank Regiment) to form the Royal Armoured Corps. His efforts to prepare for amphibious warfare met grudging acceptance from the Royal Navy, which created a Combined Operations Centre at Eastney only to disband it soon after the war began. The Prime Minister, Neville Chamberlain, resisted pressure from Hore-Belisha for the introduction of conscription, but a national appeal for volunteers for the Territorial Army fell short of the numbers required, and the Auxiliary Territorial Service began recruiting women. Finally, conscription was introduced in May 1939. For his services, Adam was made a Companion of the Order of the Bath in the 1939 New Year Honours.

== Second World War ==
When Gort went to command the British Expeditionary Force (BEF), he wanted to take Adam as his chief of staff. Hore-Belisha refused the request on the grounds of maintaining continuity. However, in October 1939 Adam was appointed commander of III Corps, which by February 1940 was crossing the Channel to join the BEF. III Corps was earmarked for operations in Scandinavia, but by April the planned invasion was cancelled when Germany invaded Denmark and Norway, and the Corps remained in France. When in late May, the BEF was ordered to evacuate, Adam was given the task of organising the Dunkirk perimeter; Major General S. R. Wason took over command of III Corps. It was substantially due to Adam's leadership that the BEF was able to retreat behind a strong perimeter and carry out the Dunkirk evacuation. Ordered to leave on 26 May, Adam and Brigadier Frederick Lawson found a canvas boat on the sand dunes and rowed out to a waiting destroyer. For his part, he was mentioned in despatches a fourth time.

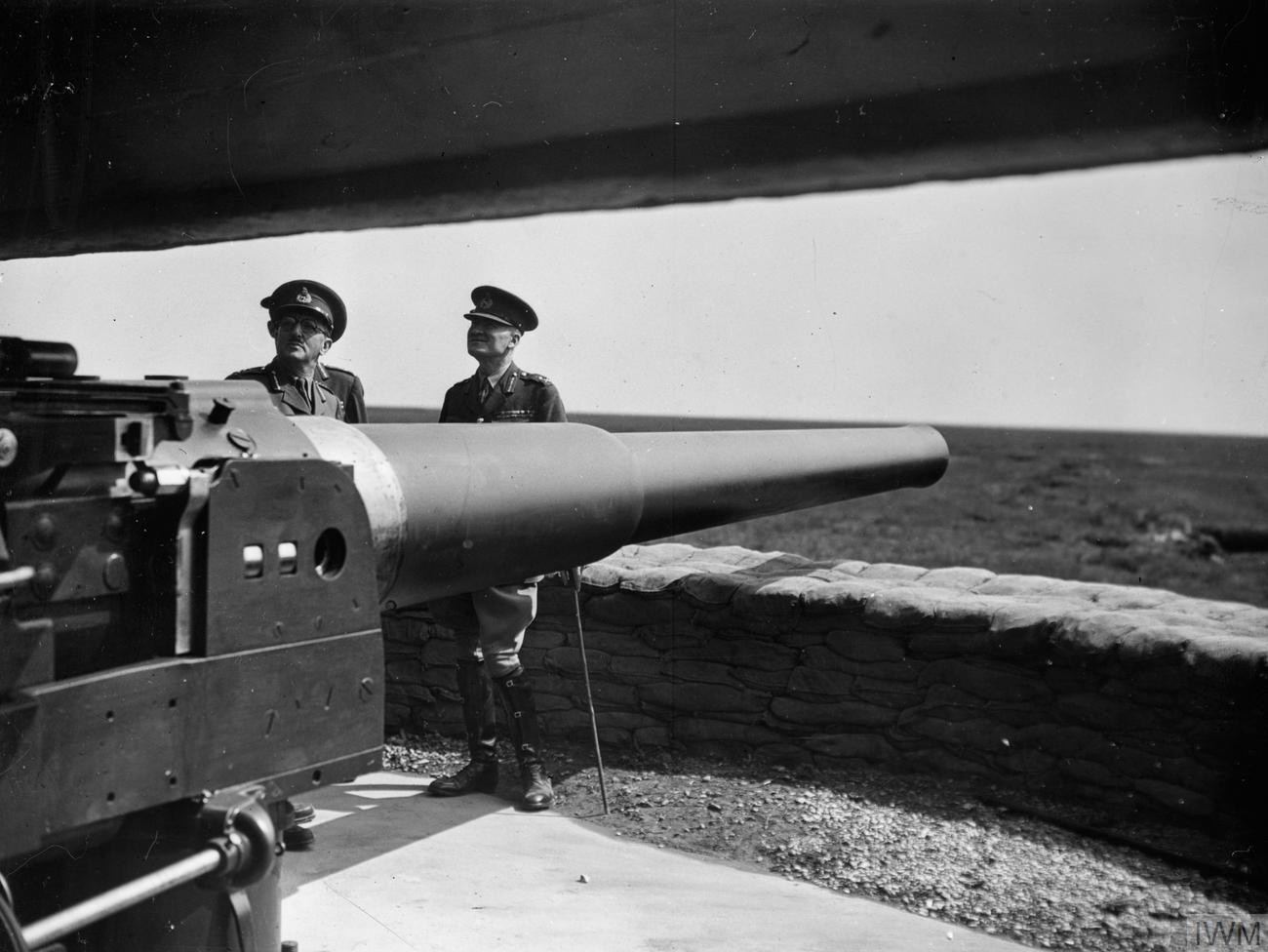
The Commander-in-Chief, Home Forces, General Sir Alan Brooke (left), during a visit to Northern Command with Adam (right), conferring around a 6-inch coastal defence gun, 6 August 1940.

Following his return from France on 31 May 1940, Adam was appointed General Officer Commanding-in-Chief Northern Command, responsible for the defence of the coastline from The Wash to the Scottish border. It was during his year with Northern Command that he concluded that the army needed both more effective selection procedures and to ensure that soldiers understood the cause for which they were fighting. On 1 June 1941 he was appointed Adjutant-General, the second military member of the Army Council and a key role with responsibility for all personnel, administration and organisational matters. The role was of particular importance during the war years because of the need for the army to adapt its practices to meet the needs of a conscript army led by non-career officers.

In peacetime, each infantry regiment conducted its own recruit training. As a result, in 1941 there were fifty-eight infantry and four machine gun training centres. In July 1941, Adam consolidated them, reducing their number to just fourteen and one. This saved 14,000 men. Adam then went further. Since battle casualties need to be replaced either by cross-posting or new recruits from training centres, he proposed creating a Corps of Infantry. Others ranks could then be routinely cross-posted; no transfer to another regiment would be required. The proposal met with alarm among traditionalists at the War Office, who blocked it. However, Adam managed to then push through another reform creating the General Service Corps (GSC) in January 1942. All recruits—some 710,000 between July 1942 and May 1945— were initially posted to the GSC for the period of their basic training, after which they were sent to a training centre for specialised training, which took from sixteen weeks for the infantry up to thirty weeks for signallers. Transfers of men from one corps to another were still needed, especially in late 1944 when thousands of men were transferred from anti-aircraft units to the infantry.

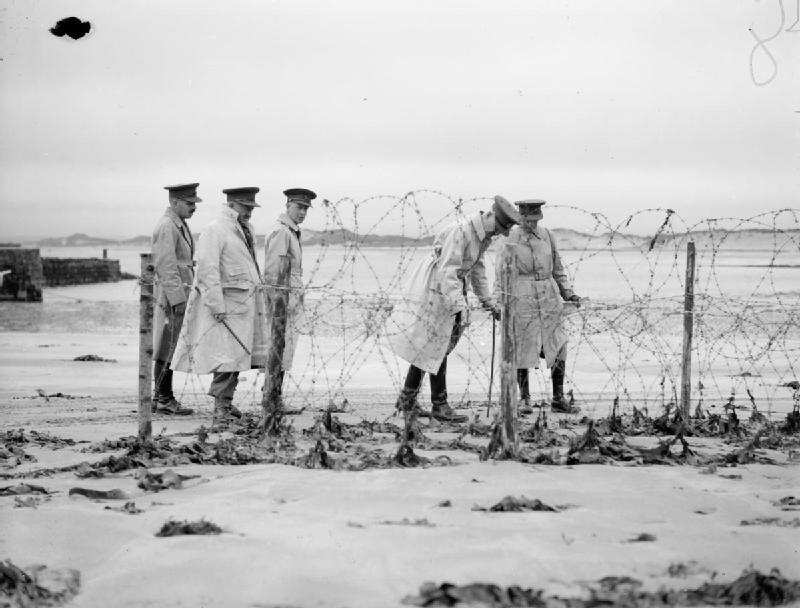
Lieutenant General Sir Ronald Adam, making a tour of inspection of some of the defences on the Northumbrian coast accompanied by Brigadier J. W. L. S. Hubert, commanding the 161st Brigade within whose area they were.

The new system gave the Army more time to assess the capabilities of recruits and how to best employ them. In 1940, the government had hastily mobilised 120 infantry battalions. By the middle of 1941, half of these had been disbanded, and their manpower transferred to other arms. In November 1941, recruiting of skilled men was halted pending investigation of 9,800 allegations of misuse of skilled personnel. Of these, 1,300 were found to be justified. Adam noted in July 1941 that the Army was "wasting its manpower in this war as badly as it did in the last." He set up a Directorate for the Selection of Personnel that drew up aptitude tests to establish recruits' psychological stability, combatant temperament, technical aptitudes and leadership potential. IQ tests were rejected as being for children. Standardised tests were developed to classify men into six grades, and nine trade groupings, which were then allocated to each arm. Under the new system the failure rate for tradesmen dropped from 16.7 to 6.7 per cent, and for drivers from 16 to 20 per cent to 3 per cent. When applied to women, the failure rate for radio operators plunged from 64 per cent to just 3 per cent.

Under Adam's guidance, this led to tackling the British Army's other major personnel problem, officer selection. As in the Great War, the classes that had traditionally provided leadership in society could not furnish the numbers of leaders that the Army needed. Those with a university education who had completed Officers' Training Corps (OTC) training were immediately commissioned. Those that had attended a public school were sent to an Officer Cadet Training Unit (OCTU) for a three-month course before being commissioned. While there were those who felt that one's parents' ability to pay for an education did not necessarily imply the possession of leadership qualities, it was considered that public school boys were imbued with good character, self-restraint, perseverance, and courage, and that participation in team sports promoted physical fitness and quick decision making—all characteristics that the Army considered desirable in its officers. This still did not provide enough officers. Commanders were ordered to furnish quotas of potential officers from their other ranks for OCTUs, but not all nominated, or could nominate, good candidates, and there was a general feeling that men with only elementary schooling, regional accents or even mildly left-wing views had no chance of nomination. Failure rates at the OCTUs were high, averaging around 30 per cent of the candidates on each course.

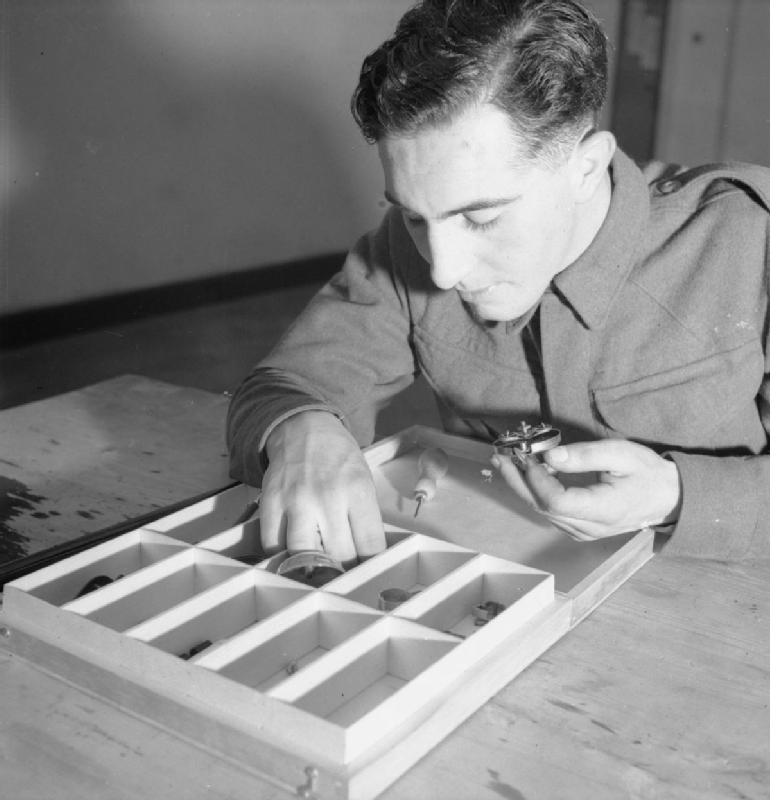
A new recruit, Bill Jones, undertakes a mechanical ability test.

Adam did not accept the traditional view that there was an "officer-producing class", but believed that men and women of innate ability could be found in all parts of the community. Both these innovations met resistance, most of which was overcome. He instituted a new system of OCTU nomination that was no longer based on a simple interview by commanding officers, but carried out through a War Office Selection Board ("Wozbee") whose members, advised by psychiatrists and psychologists, oversaw various tests, especially those aimed at showing a man's leadership potential. Psychiatrists were in short supply, and there were doubts about the value of predictive psychiatry. Wozbees were established at home starting in March 1942, and overseas by the middle of 1943. Men were sent to a country house in groups of 30 to 40, and divided to groups of about eight. They then undertook a series of tests. Adam particularly liked the one where a leaderless group was asked to bridge a stream using material lying about, which included three planks, all too short, and some rope. "The test showed", he noted, "not only who were the leaders, but also those who fitted into a team." By the end of the war, 21 per cent of the British Army's officers had elementary school education, compared with 34 per cent who had attended public schools.

Adam went even further in his search for officer candidates. In one experiment, he divided a unit into four groups—officers, junior NCOs, senior NCOs and polled an entire unit, asking all ranks to nominate potential officers. Those nominated by three out of four groups were then sent to the Wozbee. Of the 114 nominated, 56 per cent passed, which was not significantly higher than the usual 54 per cent, but 7 per cent of the unit was nominated instead of the usual 0.1 per cent, producing far more officers. Adam then wanted to expand the trial, but for his critics, it was clear evidence that he had finally crossed the line from socialism to full-blown Bolshevism. The Commander-in-Chief of Home Forces, Lieutenant General Sir Bernard Paget wrote to the Secretary of State for War, Sir James Grigg, warning him that Adam was "a serious menace to both morale and discipline." When the matter was placed before the Army Council, Brooke and Grigg, who normally protected Adam, failed to support it, and the trial did not proceed. The British Army remained short of officers. In order to supplement the British Army with junior officers, Adam helped devise the CANLOAN program in 1944; which saw 673 Canadian officers serve in British units. Just before D-Day, some 200 Canadian officers were seconded to the British 21st Army Group in Europe, and 168 Australian officers to the Fourteenth Army in Burma. The effectiveness of the Wozbees is hard to gauge. When commanding officers in the Mediterranean and the 21st Army Group were surveyed in 1943 and 1944, they considered that there was little difference between the products of the Wozbees and those nominated by earlier means, suggesting that their training was more important. George MacDonald Fraser, the author of the Harry Flashman series of novels opined that "the general view throughout the Army was that they weren't fit to select bus conductors, let alone officers."

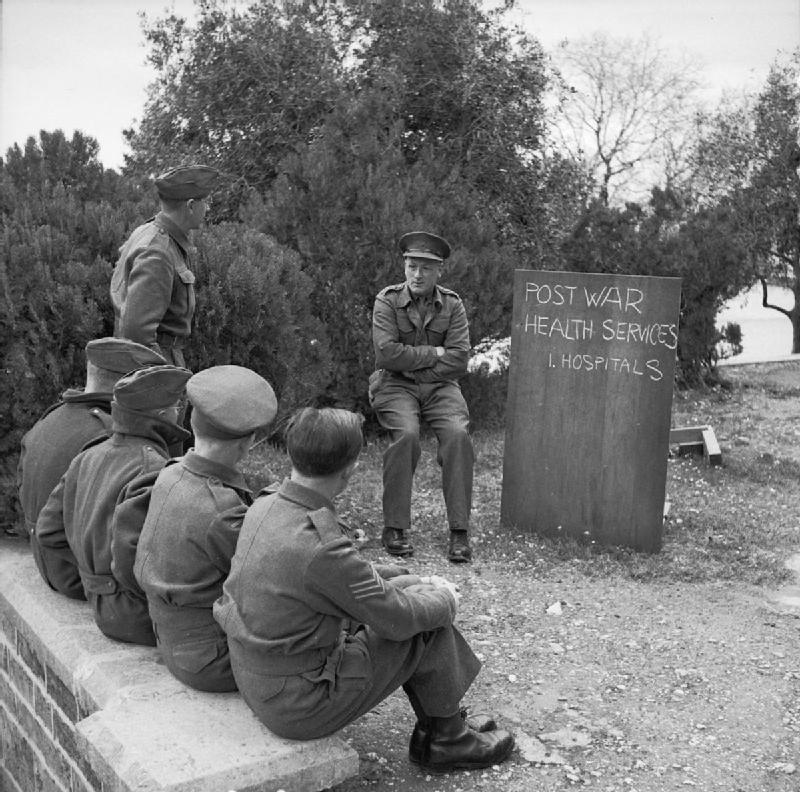
An Army Bureau of Current Affairs (ABCA) course at the American University in Beirut, for officers stationed in the Middle East. A medical officer is shown giving a lecture on plans for a post-war health service. The ABCA, which provided the opportunity for debate on current social and political affairs, was often accused of having a left-wing bias as it concentrated on progressive ideas for peace-time reconstruction.

No one was specifically responsible for morale in the Army as a whole until 1941, when it was given to Adam. He championed the Army Bureau of Current Affairs (ABCA), which produced fortnightly pamphlets on current developments to provide officers with material for compulsory discussion groups with their men. He and other senior officers recognised that the call of "King and Country", which had been so powerful in 1914, was not enough for a more sceptical generation; a citizen army had to be encouraged into battle, not just ordered. However, the "Theirs not to reason why, theirs but to do and die" attitude was still widespread almost a century after the Battle of Balaclava, and the leftward swing in British public opinion during the war years that resulted in a landslide for the Labour Party in the 1945 general election was blamed by some Conservatives on the ABCA, a charge Adam considered absurd. The ABCA discussion groups substituted the "habit of rational argument for the anarchy of the barrack-room argument", he told the British Institute of Adult Education in 1945.

On an inspection tour of the Middle East Command in November 1943, Adam, by pure chance, encountered men who had been condemned to death and penal servitude for their part in the Salerno mutiny. He immediately suspended their sentences. In a letter to General Sir Bernard Montgomery, who had not been consulted about the sentences, Adam wrote that this was "one of the worst things we have ever done." Some of the men subsequently deserted, and therefore had their sentences re-imposed. Adam appointed a psychiatrist to examine their mental state. He wanted them released, but this did not occur before the end of the war. Adam blamed the mutiny on maladministration in General Sir Harold Alexander's 15th Army Group; Montgomery was more specific, putting the blame on Lieutenant General Sir Charles Miller, Alexander's Chief Administrative Officer.

As the end of the war approached, thoughts turned to demobilisation. Adam asked for the records of the demobilisation after the Great War, and found that they had been destroyed. Information was gathered from newspapers, Hansard, journal articles, and a chapter in Winston Churchill's The World Crisis. He instituted a demobilisation system based on the "first in, first out" principle, in which the only criteria were age and length of service, and resisted attempts to repeat the practice in 1918–19 of giving priority to the needs of the economy. Employers had preferred men with recent experience to those who had been away for years, which had led to mutinies by long-serving men. Adam remembered that many men had been hurt that in the demobilisation process they had left the Army without a word of thanks for years of service. He instituted a procedure whereby an officer personally thanked each man and said "goodbye."

Adam was seen by Churchill, amongst others, as being too radical, and Adam aroused the suspicions of more conservative generals like Paget. Churchill even attempted to have him posted in early 1944 as Governor of Gibraltar but Brooke, who had been appointed CIGS at the end of 1941, and who saw him as progressive, ensured Adam continued to hold the post of Adjutant-General so long as Brooke remained CIGS, which he did until the end of the war. Adam was promoted to general on 12 April 1942. His influence on the conduct of the war was not only through his long tenure as Adjutant-General but also because he was one of Brooke's only two confidants, and the two of them lunched together regularly when both were in London.

Adam was appointed a Knight Commander of the Order of the Bath in the 1941 Birthday Honours, and a Knight Grand Cross of the Order of the Bath in the 1946 New Year Honours. He was also made a Commander of the United States Legion of Merit on 14 November 1947. He was colonel commandant of the Royal Army Dental Corps from 1945 to 1951, of the Royal Artillery from 1940 to 1950, and of the Army Educational Corps from 1940 to 1950. He retired from the Army on 15 July 1946. He was succeeded by General Sir Richard O'Connor, who hated the job, and resigned in August 1947. Few of Adam's reforms survived. The Wozbees remained, but psychologists were removed from them. Infantry training reverted to the regiments, but post-war cuts in the size of the British Army reduced the number of infantry regiments though amalgamation and disbandment from 64 in 1945 to 16 in 2012, achieving much the same result. The ABCA was abolished in 1945.

== Later life ==
In retirement, Adam's progressive record as Adjutant-General made him highly sought after by civilian organisations working in the field of adult education. He was chairman and Director General of the British Council from 1946 to 1954. He was also chairman of the National Institute of Industrial Psychology from 1947 to 1952, of the council of the Institute of Education at the University of London from 1948 until 1967, of the Library Association in 1949, and of the National Institute of Adult Education from 1949 to 1964.

He was a member, and then chairman of the executive board of the United Nations Educational, Scientific and Cultural Organisation (UNESCO), and chairman of the United Nations Association – UK from 1957 to 1960. He was also principal of the Working Men's College, and sat on the governing bodies of the University of London's Birkbeck College from 1949 to 1967, and National Institute of Adult Continuing Education from 1949 to 1964. He was awarded an honorary LLD degree by the University of Aberdeen in 1945, and made an honorary fellow of Worcester College, Oxford, in 1946. He remained a severe critic of the British educational system and in 1961 wrote that it would not be fundamentally changed until private education was ended.

Passionate about cricket, Adam was the president of the Marylebone Cricket Club from 1946 to 1947. He also served as chairman of the Linoleum Working Party in 1946, and was a member of the council of the Tavistock Clinic from 1945 to 1953, and the Miners' Welfare Commission from 1946 to 1952. With Charles Judd he published a short book produced in association with the United Nations Association, Assault at Arms: A Policy for Disarmament (1960).

His sister, Hetty, moved in to help when his wife Dorothy became ill in the late 1960s, and remained after Dorothy died in 1972, until her own death in 1977. Adam died at his home in Faygate, Sussex, on 26 December 1982, and was buried in St Mary Magdalene churchyard in Rusper, Sussex, on 5 January 1983. He was survived by three of his daughters, and succeeded in the baronetcy by his nephew, Christopher Eric Forbes Adam. His papers are in the Liddell Hart Centre for Military Archives at King's College London.

== Arms ==
Coat of arms of Ronald Adam

Crest
A cubit arm Argent holding in the hand a cross crosslet fitchee in bend sinister and charged on the wrist with a rose both as in the arms.
Escutcheon
Argent a mullet pierced between three cross crosslets fitchee Gules a chief of the last thereon a pale Or charged with a rose of the second barbed and seeded Proper.
Motto
Crux Mihi Grata Quies

== Notes ==
Military offices
Preceded by Viscount Gort	Commandant of the Staff College, Camberley; 1937–1938	Succeeded by Bernard Paget
New post	Deputy Chief of the Imperial General Staff; 1938–1939	Succeeded by Hugh Massy
New post	GOC III Corps; 1939–1940	Succeeded by James Marshall-Cornwall
Preceded by Sir William Bartholomew	GOC-in-C Northern Command; 1940–1941	Succeeded by Sir Ralph Eastwood
Preceded by Sir Colville Wemyss	Adjutant-General; 1941–1946	Succeeded by Sir Richard O'Connor
Baronetage of the United Kingdom
Preceded by Frank Forbes Adam	Baronet (of Hankelow Court); 1926–1982	Succeeded by Christopher Eric Forbes Adam
