= Frank Forbes Adam =

British banker (1846–1926)

Adam in July 1926.

Sir Frank Forbes Adam, 1st Baronet CB, CIE, DL (17 June 1846 – 22 December 1926) was a British banker who made his fortune in British India. He was President of the Bank of Bombay. He was one of the main movers of the raising of funds to support those affected by famine in India in 1897 and 1900.

He was educated at Loretto School.

He was appointed Companion of the Order of the Indian Empire (CIE) in 1888, and (Knight Bachelor) in 1890. Appointed a deputy lieutenant of Lancashire on 26 April 1904, Forbes was created Baronet of Hankelow Court, Chester in 1917 and appointed Companion of the Order of the Bath in 1919.

He married Rose Frances, daughter of Charles Gordon Kemball, a judge of the High Court of Bombay. They had three sons and a daughter:

- Sir Ronald Forbes Adam, 2nd Baronet GCB, DSO, OBE (1885–1982), British army general.
- Eric Forbes Adam CMG (1888–1925), diplomat
- Colin Gurdon Forbes Adam CSI (1889–1982), civil servant
- Hetty Reay Clifford Forbes Adam MBE (1896–1970).

Coat of arms of Frank Forbes Adam

Crest
A cubit arm Argent holding in the hand a cross crosslet fitchee in bend sinister and charged on the wrist with a rose both as in the arms.
Escutcheon
Argent a mullet pierced between three cross crosslets fitchee Gules a chief of the last thereon a pale Or charged with a rose of the second barbed and seeded Proper.
Motto
Crux Mihi Grata Quies

Baronetage of the United Kingdom
| New creation | Baronet (of Hankelow Court); 1917–1926 | Succeeded by Ronald Forbes Adam |
