= Snettisham RSPB reserve =

RSPB nature reserve in Norfolk, England

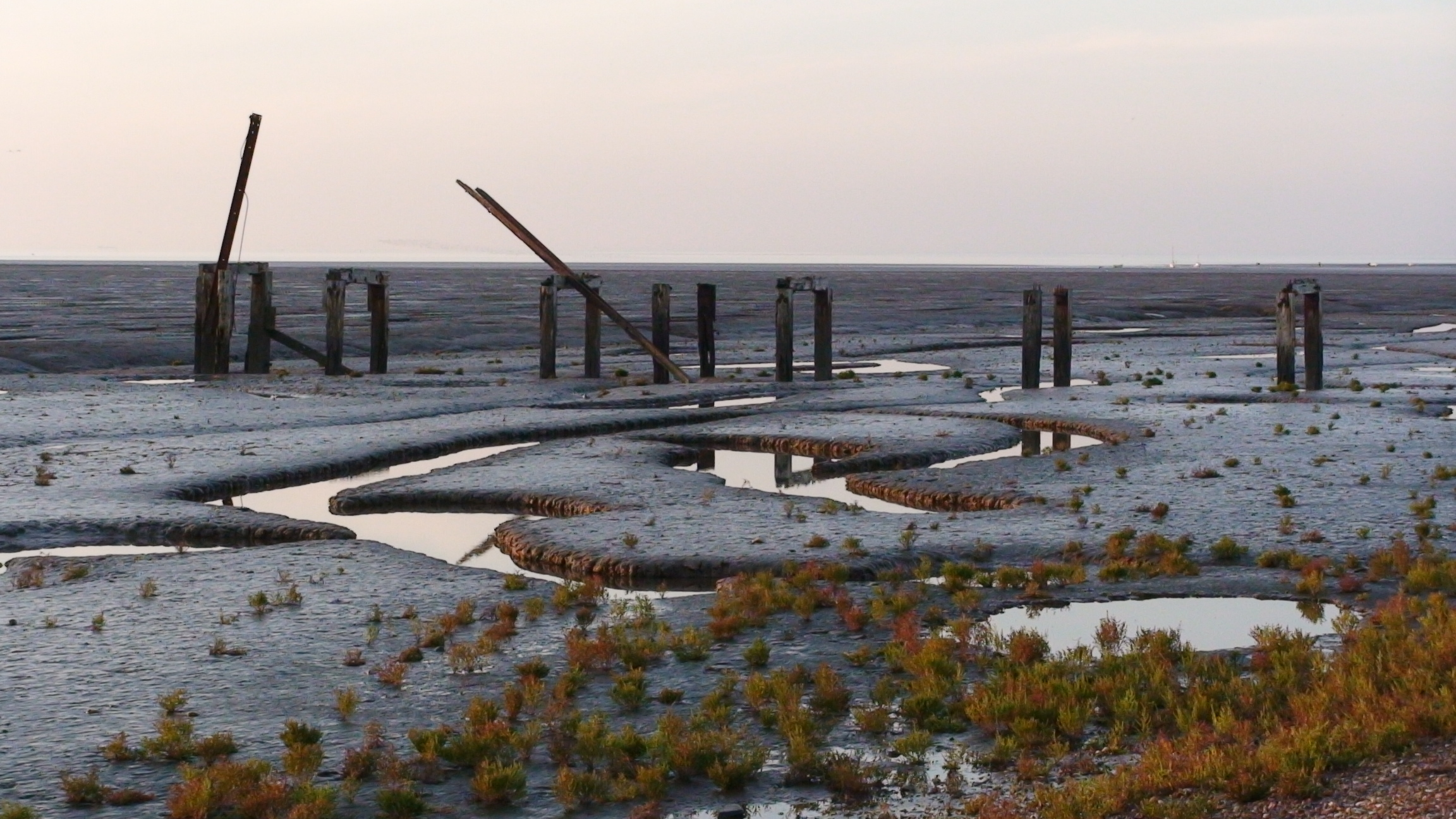
- The Jetty
- Interactive map of Snettisham RSPB reserve
- Type: Nature reserve
- Location: Norfolk, England
- Coordinates: 52.8573°N 0.4469°E
- Operator: RSPB

Snettisham RSPB reserve is a nature reserve in the care of the Royal Society for the Protection of Birds, situated near Snettisham in the county of Norfolk, England, north of King's Lynn, and close to Sandringham. It faces The Wash, a large estuary. In autumn and winter, the big tides of the Wash pushes up hundreds of thousands of wading birds onto the Norfolk coast. The nature reserve's bird lagoons provide a safe habitat for them.

Snettisham is unique in a couple of ways. It is rare in Norfolk that it is a beach facing West. However the unique geological nature of Snettisham is what attracts hundreds of thousands of migratory and transitory birds during the winter and autumn periods. High tides can push huge numbers of waders closer to where people can observe them.

During the year the bird population and diversity of what can be seen here will vary greatly, but species regularly seen here include little ringed plover, oystercatcher, golden plover, knot, bar-tailed godwit, sanderling, curlew, spotted redshank, pink-footed geese and peregrine falcon.

Snettisham pits were dug out during World War II in order to provide shingle that was used to build concrete runways as the American Bombers were too heavy to land on grass. The pits stretch for over 2.5 km and are split equally between the RSPB reserve and privately owned beach properties, including the Snettisham Beach Sailing Club.

Evidence of the operation is still visible today as the concrete roads made to transport the shingle are still used today by the residents to access their property. Whilst the roads are no longer used in the reserve, pieces of them line most of the length of the pits. One of the most distinctive landmarks left from the operation are the ruins of the jetty used to load the shingle on to boats so it could be transported across the country.

== Public Access ==
There is a 2 km (approx) path to the reserve from the car park.

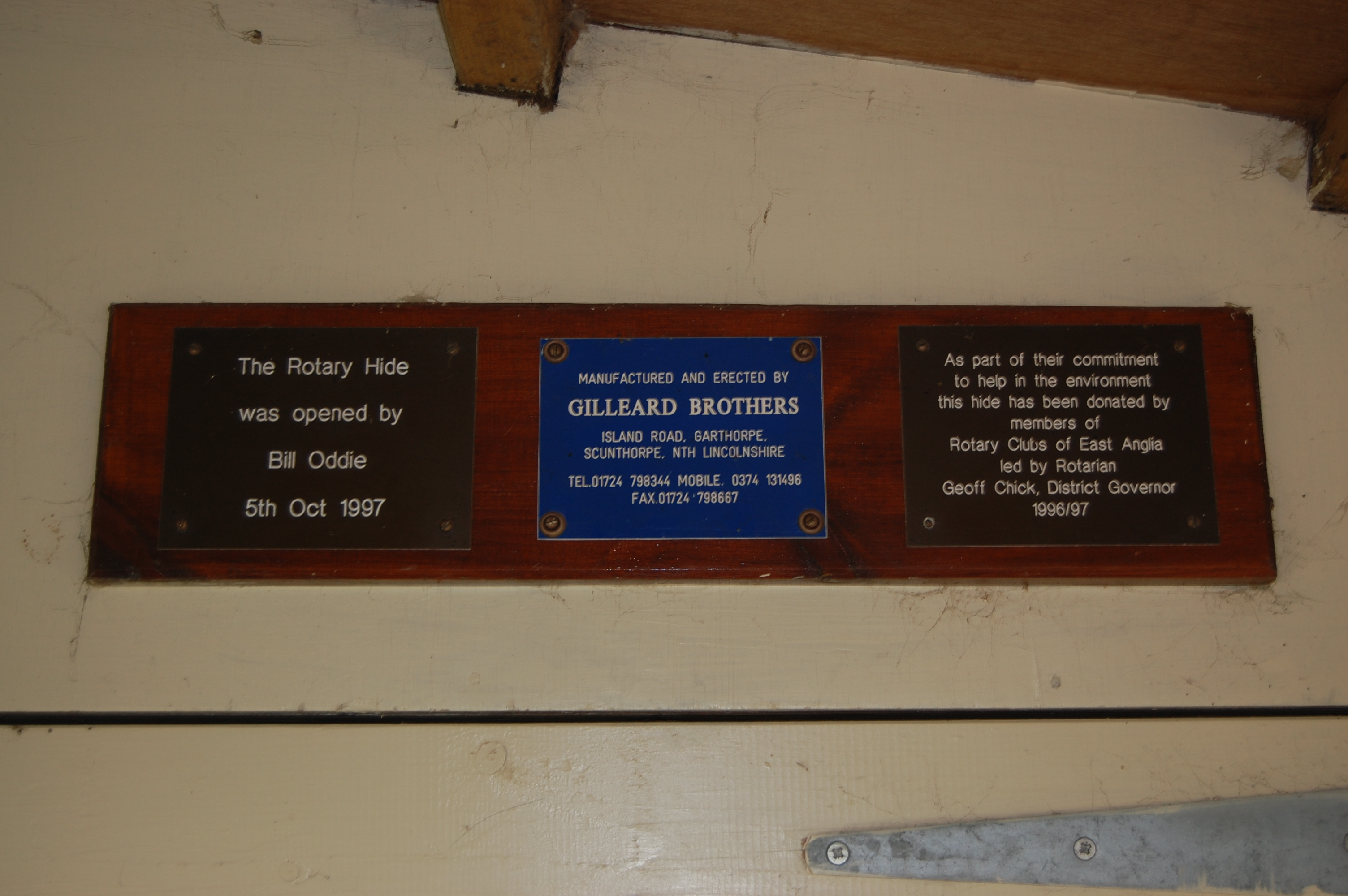
Plaques in Rotary Hide

There is a circular walk around the reserve, with three hides. One, the Rotary Hide, was donated by the Rotary Clubs of East Anglia, and opened on 5 October 1997, by Bill Oddie.

This whole area 57.627 hectares are common land. Shingle collection rights belong to the inhabitants of Snettisham.

== Pictures ==
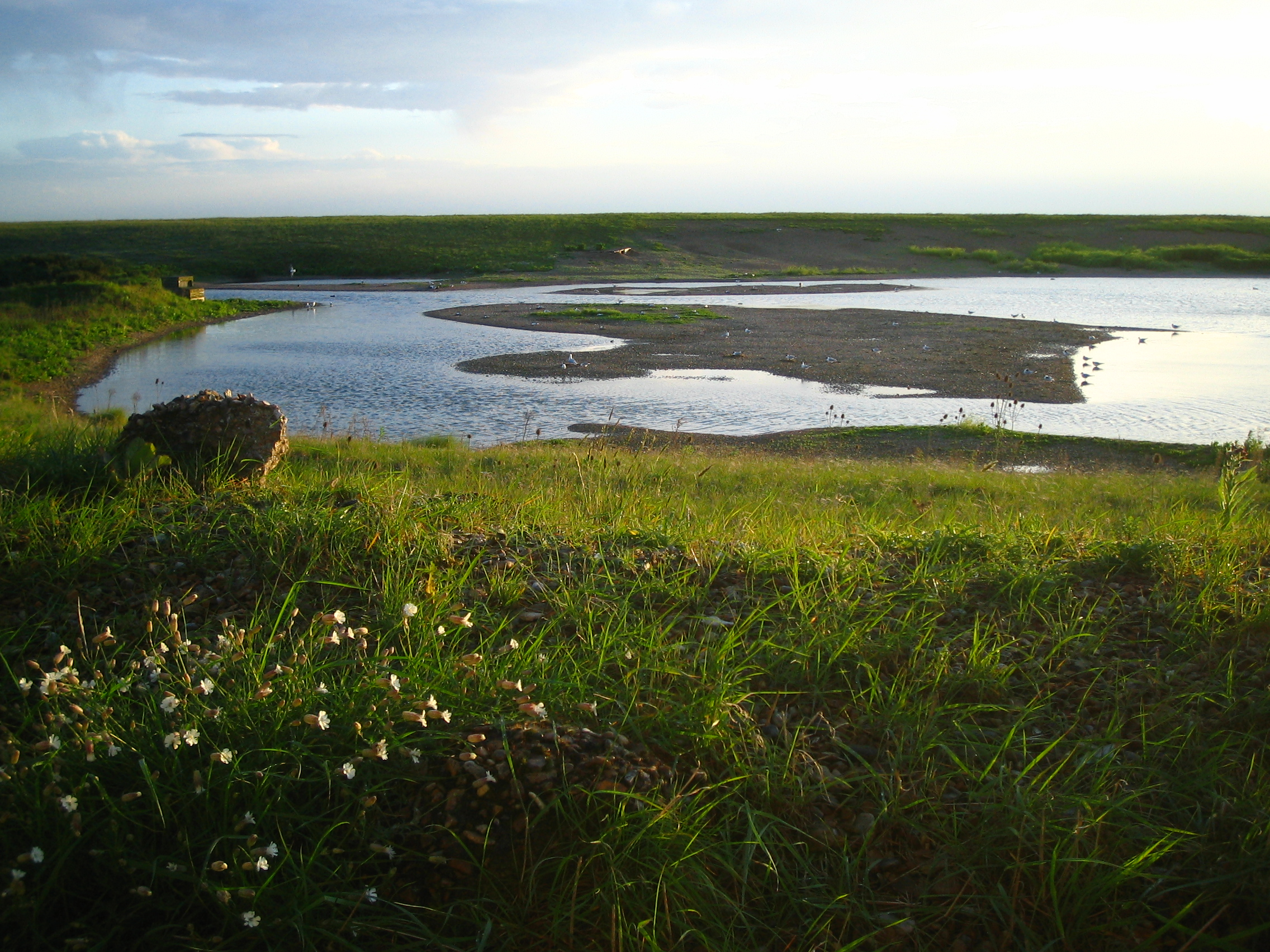
View of the pits from one of the bird hides

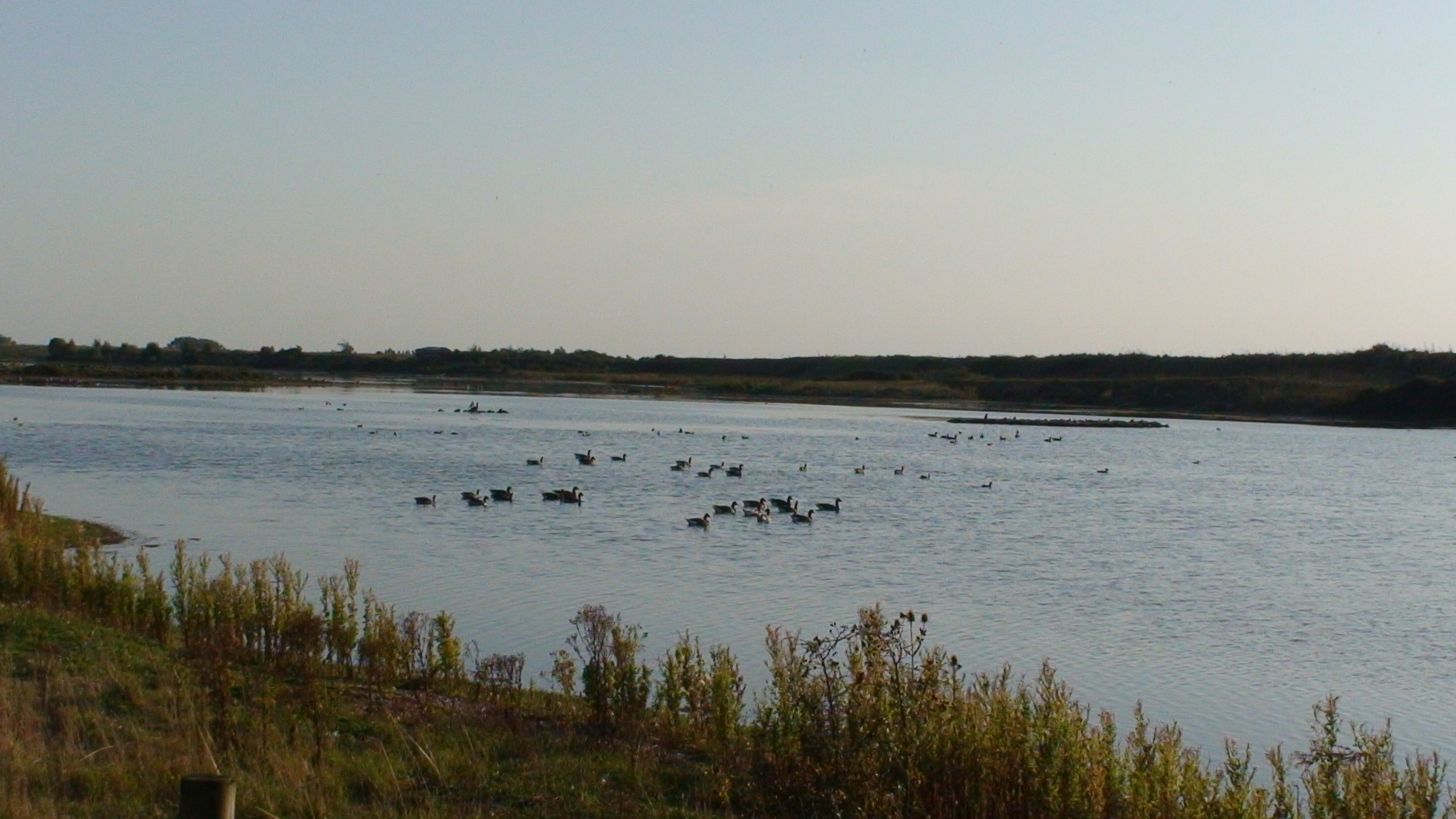
Birds swimming in the gravel pits

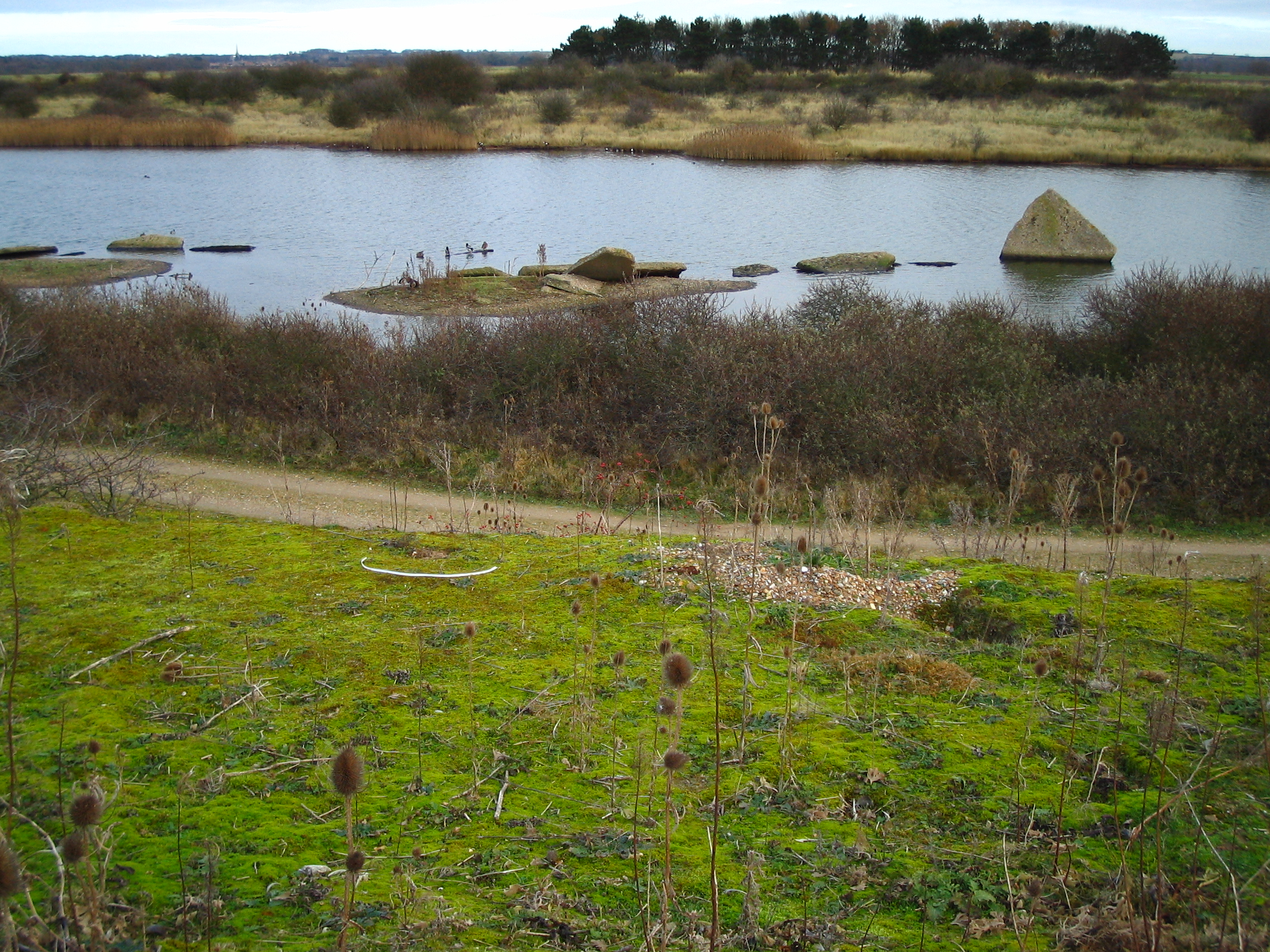
A picture of the pits showing the remains of the concrete roads laid during World War 2
