= William Marling =

Sir William Henry Marling, 2nd Baronet, JP, DL (1 July 1835 – 19 October 1919) was an English baronet.

== Early life ==
Marling was born in Stroud to Sir Samuel Marling. He was educated at Trinity College, Cambridge.

== Marriage ==
Marling married Mary Abraham in 1860: they had four sons.

== Succession ==
Marling succeeded his father as second baronet of Stanley Park and Sedbury Park in the County of Gloucester in 1883. He was succeeded by his son in 1919.

== County office ==
Marling was appointed High Sheriff of Gloucestershire in 1888.

Honorary titles
Preceded by Lionel Edward Darell	High Sheriff of Gloucestershire; 1888	Succeeded by John Skipworth Gibbons
Baronetage of the United Kingdom
Preceded by Samuel Marling	Baronet (of Stanley Park and Sedbury Hall); 1883–1919	Succeeded by Percival Marling
