= Percival Marling =

Recipient of the Victoria Cross

Sir Percival Scrope Marling, 3rd Baronet
- Born: 6 March 1861; Stanley Park, Selsley
- Died: 29 May 1936 (aged 75)
- Burial place: All Saints Church Vault, Selsley
- Military career
- Allegiance: United Kingdom
- Branch: British Army
- Rank: Colonel
- Units: King's Royal Rifle Corps
- Commands: 18th Royal Hussars
- Conflicts: First Boer War; 1882 Anglo-Egyptian War; Mahdist War; Second Boer War; First World War
- Awards: Victoria Cross; Order of the Bath

Colonel Sir Percival Scrope Marling, 3rd Baronet, VC, CB, DL (6 March 1861 – 29 May 1936) was an English British Army officer and recipient of the Victoria Cross, the highest and most prestigious award for gallantry in the face of the enemy that can be awarded to British and Commonwealth forces.

== Early life ==
Marling was born on 6 March 1861, the son of William Henry Marling. He was educated at Harrow School.

== Military career ==
Marling was commissioned a second lieutenant into the King's Royal Rifle Corps on 11 August 1880, and promoted to lieutenant on 1 July 1881.

He was 23 years old, and a lieutenant in the 3rd Battalion, The King's Royal Rifle Corps, British Army, attached Mounted Infantry during the Mahdist War when the following deed took place for which he was awarded the VC.

On 13 March 1884 at the Battle of Tamai in the Sudan during the Mahdist War, Lieutenant Marling risked his life to save that of a private of The Royal Sussex Regiment who had been shot. His citation reads:

For his conspicuous bravery at the battle of Tamai, on 13th March last, in risking his life to save that of Private Morley, Royal Sussex Regiment, who, having been shot, was lifted and placed in front of Lieutenant Marling on his horse. He fell off almost immediately, when Lieutenant Marling dismounted, and gave up his horse for the purpose of carrying off Private Morley, the enemy pressing close on to them until they succeeded in carrying him about 80 yards to a place of comparative safety.

Marling was promoted to captain on 22 December 1888 and to major on 12 August 1896.

He served in the Second Boer War (1899–1902) in South Africa, where in March 1901 he took over the command of the 18th Hussars. He was promoted to lieutenant-colonel on 19 February 1902. For his service during the war, he was mentioned in despatches (dated 8 April 1902) and appointed a Companion of the Order of the Bath (CB) in the South Africa honours list published on 26 June 1902. After the war ended in June 1902 he returned home on the SS Sicilia, which arrived at Southampton in October 1902, and he received the actual decoration of CB from King Edward VII during an investiture at Buckingham Palace on 24 October 1902.

On 20 October 1903, he was appointed a deputy lieutenant of Gloucestershire, and served in World War I, being made a general staff officer, grade 1 in May 1915.

In 1923 he was appointed high sheriff of Gloucestershire.

He later achieved the rank of colonel in February 1907 and died on 29 May 1936. He wrote an autobiography, Rifleman And Hussar (John Murray, London, 1931) detailing his military career.

== The Medal ==
His VC is on display in the Lord Ashcroft Gallery at the Imperial War Museum, London.

Honorary titles
Preceded by Edward Conder	High Sheriff of Gloucestershire; 1923	Succeeded by Sir Lionel Darell
Baronetage of the United Kingdom
Preceded by William Henry Marling	Baronet (of Stanley Park and Sedbury Hall); 1919–1936	Succeeded by John Stanley Vincent Marling
