= Mersey Barrage =

Tidal barrage proposal in North West England

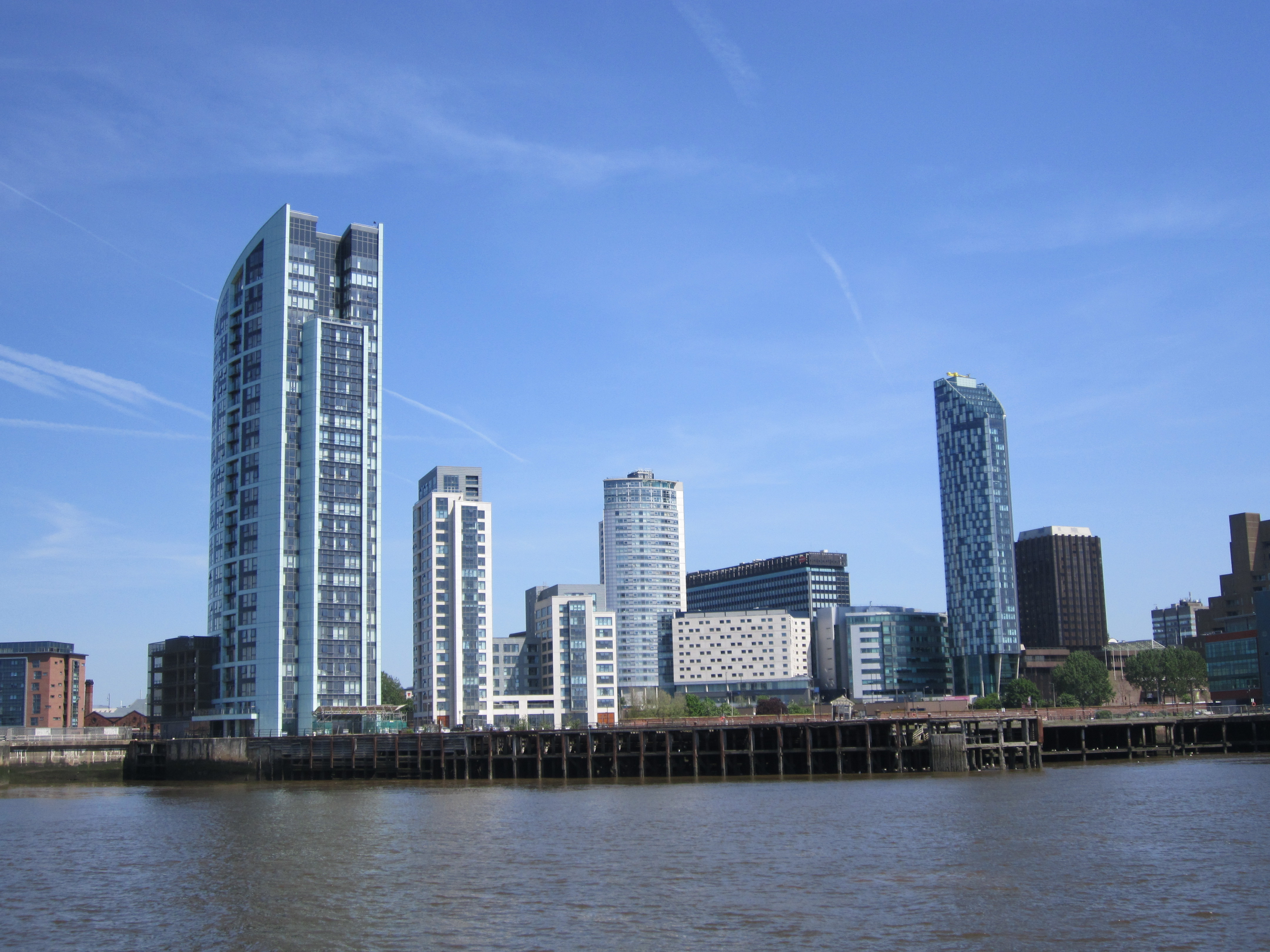
- The Mersey waterfront at Liverpool

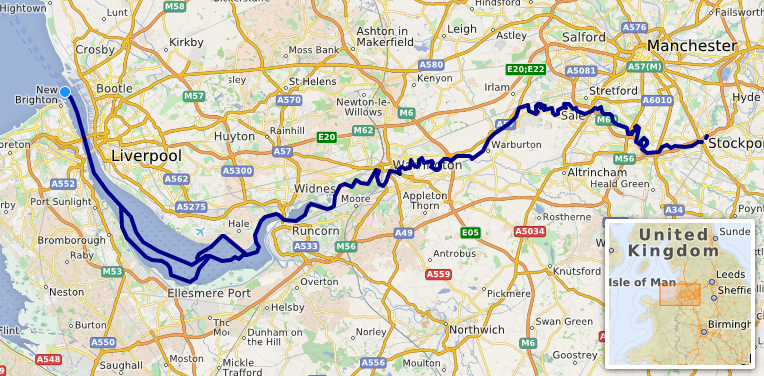
- The River Mersey is highlighted in blue interactive map Coordinates: 53.45°N 3.033°W

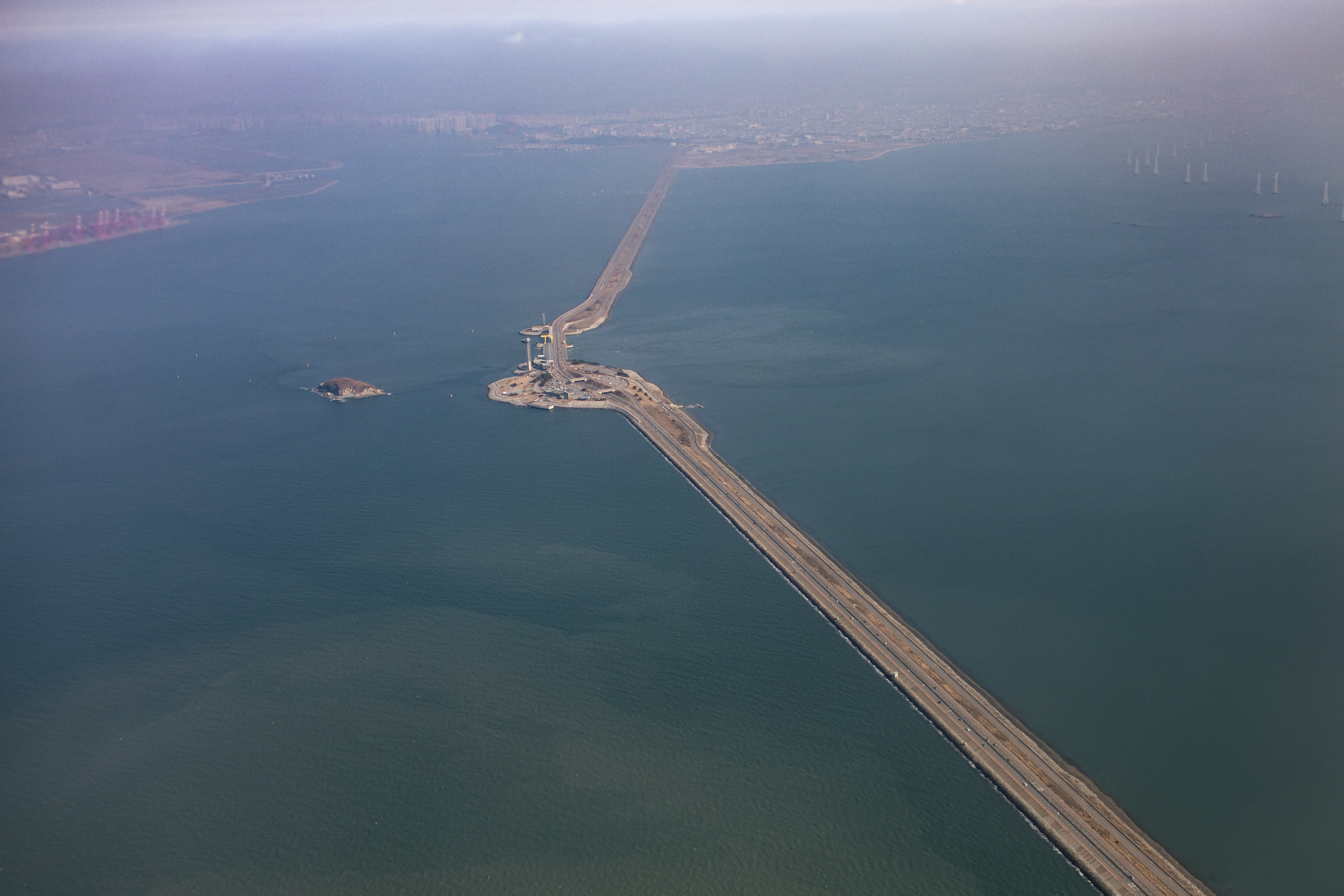
Sihwa Lake Tidal Power Station, a model for the Mersey Barrage

The Mersey Barrage is a proposed scheme for building a tidal barrage across the Mersey Estuary, between Liverpool and the Wirral Peninsula, England.

== History ==
The River Mersey is considered to be a suitable source of marine renewable energy in the United Kingdom, because of its strong current and tidal range of up to 10 m (33 ft), the second highest in the United Kingdom.

A Department of the Environment and UKAEA report in 1984 identified a site between New Brighton and Brocklebank Dock for a Mersey barrage.

A 2006 study by Peel Holdings and the North West Development Agency identified the River Mersey as having considerable potential for tidal power. A pilot project, using a water wheel to harness tidal power, was considered at Bootle docks. At the same time, a tidal barrage plan was evaluated, capable of generating 700 MW.

A barrage scheme was abandoned in 2011, following a study by Peel Energy and the North West Development Agency. This proposal involved constructing a barrage between Dingle on the Liverpool bank and New Ferry on the Wirral bank. Although the study provided valuable insight, the preferred scheme was abandoned due to the expected lack of medium-term profitability.

Steve Rotheram revived plans for a barrage as part of his 2017 election campaign. The 2018 study indicated that economics were more favourable than previously, but still fell short by 20%. In February 2020, following a year-long feasibility study, a tidal power proposal for the River Mersey was granted £2.5 million in funding to further develop the plan. In December 2022, the Liverpool City Region mayor announced an agreement between the City Region and K-water of South Korea, who built and operates the Sihwa Lake Tidal Power Station, to carry out "reciprocal visits and information sharing". The Mersey Tidal Power Project was launched as "a scoping project" in March 2024. The projected power output is not stated but it is suggested that the scheme will be able to "power a million homes".

The tidal barrage plan was put to public consultation in September 2024, starting the formal planning process. In October 2026, the Liverpool City Region Combined Authority released details of the proposed location of the barrage, a 1.5 mile stretch of the river between Bromborough and Otterspool.

== Economic impact ==
A Mersey barrage has been predicted to be capable of producing between 1.0 and 1.5 terawatt-hours of electricity per year , which is equivalent to two-thirds of Liverpool's 2017 electricity requirement.

One design has proposed that cross-river public transport infrastructure is included in the construction.

== Environmental impact ==
The estuary is designated as an internationally important protected area, for wading birds, ducks and fish. The Lancashire Wildlife Trust and the Cheshire Wildlife Trust are monitoring the progress of the proposals, and the potential impact on existing habitat and wildlife within the estuary. Following a similar scheme with the Rance Tidal Power Station in Brittany, some marine fauna initially suffered, but a new equilibrium was achieved after ten years.

== See also ==
- Cardiff Bay Barrage
- Centre Port
- Hydroelectricity in the United Kingdom
- List of tidal power stations
- Marine current power
- Marine energy
- Run-of-the-river hydroelectricity
- Severn Barrage
- Tidal power
