= Lawes baronets =

Extinct baronetcy in the Baronetage of the United Kingdom

Escutcheon of the Lawes baronets of Rothamsted

The Lawes baronetcy, of Rothamsted in the County of Hertford, was a title in the Baronetage of the United Kingdom. It was created on 19 May 1882 for the entrepreneur and agricultural scientist John Bennet Lawes.

== Lawes baronets, of Rothamsted (1882) ==
- Sir John Bennet Lawes, 1st Baronet (1814–1899)
- Sir Charles Lawes-Wittewronge, 2nd Baronet (1843–1911)
- Sir John Bennet Lawes-Wittewronge, 3rd Baronet (1872–1931)
- Sir John Claud Bennet Lawes, 4th Baronet (1898–1979)
- Sir (John) Michael Bennet Lawes, 5th Baronet (1932–2009)

On the death of the 5th baronet, the baronetcy became extinct.

== Notes ==
Baronetage of the United Kingdom
Preceded by Pease baronets	Lawes baronets of Rothamsted; 19 May 1882	Succeeded by Adam baronets
