= Outer Trial Bank =

Artificial island in the Wash

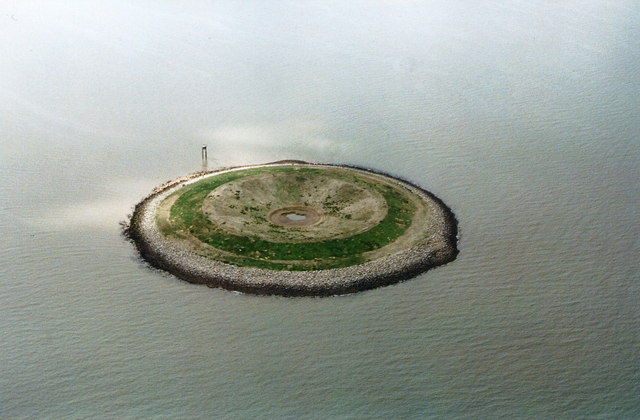
- Interactive map of Outer Trial Bank
- Type: Nature reserve
- Location: The Wash, East Anglia, England
- Coordinates: 52.8418°N 0.2431°E
- Area: 4.265 hectares (10.54 acres)

The Outer Trial Bank is a circular artificial island in the Wash, East Anglia, England. It is one of two artificial islands constructed during the 1970s for a proposed UK governmental water resources scheme.

== History ==
In 1972, the British government undertook a study to assess the feasibility of building a tidal barrage across half of the Wash. The idea was to capture the freshwater from the River Witham, River Welland, River Nene and Great Ouse, the four main rivers which flow into the Wash, in order to build a freshwater reservoir. The study also intended to establish potential improvements to the navigation of sea locks, provide recreational facilities and develop an area of land for a power station.

=== Construction of the banks ===
As part of the test, the approval to build an artificial island 2 miles (3.2 km) off the Lincolnshire coast was given in November 1974. Building work began in February 1975. The bank (known locally as "the doughnut" due to its biconcave shape) was constructed of a sand fill protected by limestone rubble. Measuring 250 metres (820 ft) in diameter, the island contained a small reservoir measuring 1 hectare (2.5 acres) in the centre.

A smaller and cruder trial bank is connected by a causeway on Terrington Marsh, Norfolk (52°49′7.05″N 0°17′15.28″E). It was constructed prior to the larger offshore version.

=== Conclusions ===
The study, which was published in 1976 as "The Wash storage scheme", found that the trial alone proved financially unfeasible (costing £3 million), and that the freshwater was too close to the tidal estuary to ensure low salinity and minimal silt levels. The trial was soon abandoned and the plans for the scheme permanently shelved.

== Present use ==
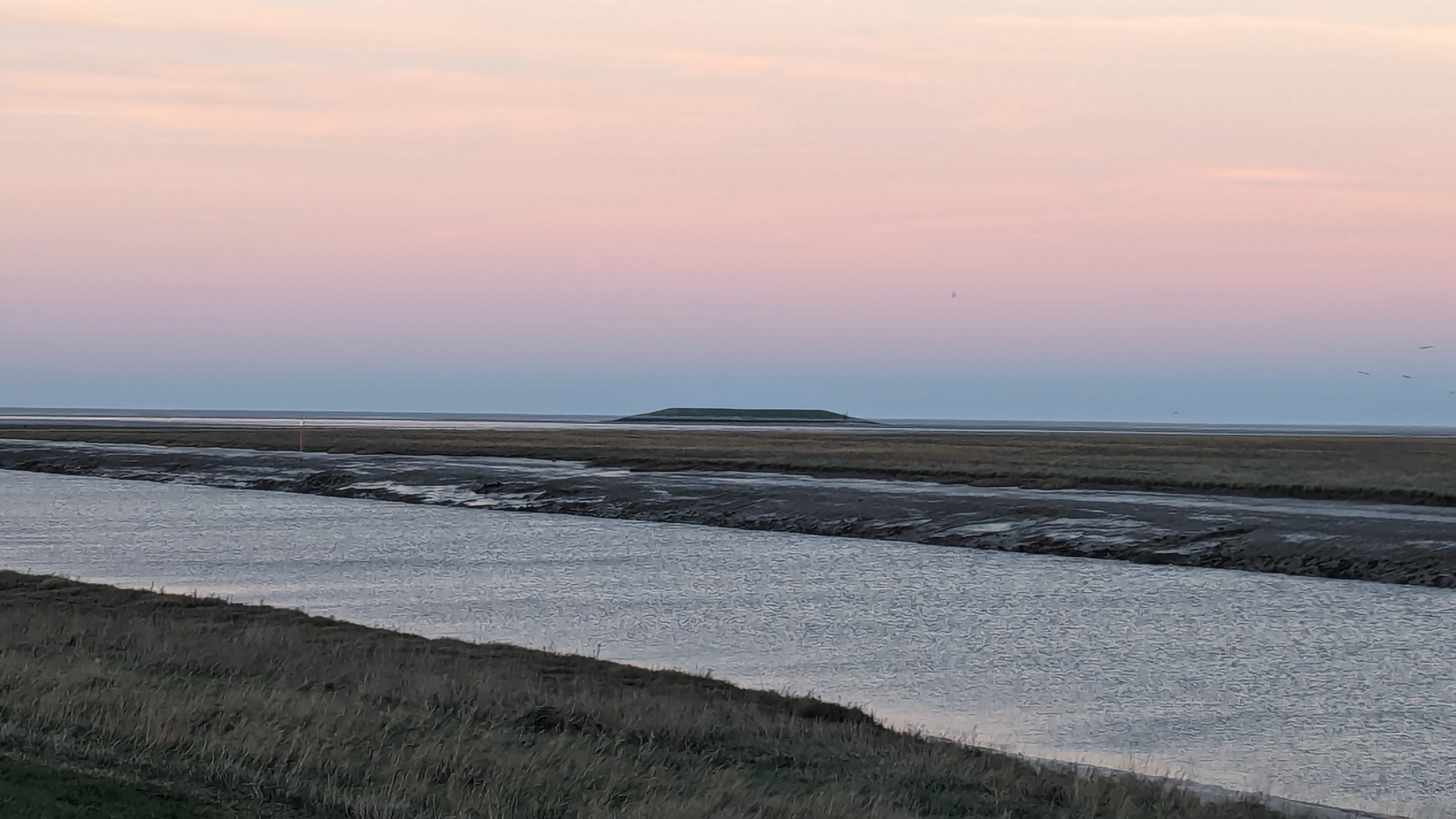
Outer Trial Bank at sunset from West Bank, Sutton Bridge

The outer bank is a nesting ground for seabirds within the national nature reserve of the Wash. In 2008, an estimated 3,000 pairs of birds nested on the island.

== See also ==
- Centre Port, a plan for a tidal barrage across The Wash
