= Colin Forbes Adam =

British civil servant

Colin Gurdon Forbes Adam CSI DL (18 December 1889 – 12 November 1982) was a British civil servant in the Indian Civil Service.

Adam was the youngest son of Sir Frank Forbes Adam, 1st Baronet. His older brothers were General Sir Ronald Forbes Adam, 2nd Baronet GCB DSO OBE and Eric Forbes Adam CMG. He was educated at Eton and King's College, Cambridge. During the First World War he served as an officer with the Indian Expeditionary Force to Mesopotamia and Palestine.

In 1920 Adam married The Hon. Irene Constance Lawley, only child of Beilby Lawley, 3rd Baron Wenlock; they had three sons and a daughter:

- Virginia Mary Forbes Adam (1922-2012), married Hugo Charteris MC.
- The Rev. Sir Stephen Timothy Beilby Forbes Adam, 4th Baronet (1923-2019)
- Desmond Francis Forbes Adam (1926-1958)
- Nigel Colin Forbes Adam, 5th Baronet (1930-2022)

Adam was appointed a Companion of the Order of the Star of India in 1924.

In 1948 Adam published Life of Lord Lloyd, a biography of George Lloyd, 1st Baron Lloyd.

Adam was a Deputy Lieutenant of Kingston-upon-Hull from 1958 to 1966.
