= Marling baronets =

Baronetcy in the Baronetage of the United Kingdom

Escutcheon of the Marling baronets of Stanley Park and Sedbury Park

The Marling baronetcy, of Stanley Park and Sedbury Park in the County of Gloucester, is a title in the Baronetage of the United Kingdom. It was created on 22 May 1882 for the cloth manufacturer and politician Samuel Marling.

The 2nd Baronet served as High Sheriff of Gloucestershire in 1888. The 3rd Baronet was an army officer and was awarded the Victoria Cross.

== Marling baronets, of Stanley Park and Sedbury Park (1882) ==
- Sir Samuel Stephens Marling, 1st Baronet (1810–1883)
- Sir William Henry Marling, 2nd Baronet (1835–1919)
- Sir Percival Scrope Marling, 3rd Baronet (1861–1936)
- Sir John Stanley Vincent Marling, 4th Baronet (1910–1977)
- Sir Charles William Somerset Marling, 5th Baronet (born 1951)

The 5th Baronet and his wife have three daughters, the third being the singer-songwriter Laura Marling. There is no heir to the title.

Baronetage of the United Kingdom
Preceded by Adam baronets of Blair Adam (1882)	Marling baronets of Stanley Park and Sedbury Park; 22 May 1882	Succeeded by Freake baronets
