= Centre Port =

Proposed development in Eastern England

Coordinates: 53.013°N 0.397°E

- The causeway road would extend from Hunstanton to Gibraltar Point
- Location: The Wash, England
- Proposer: Port Evo
- Project website: https://www.centreport.uk/ (defunct) Archived 19 April 2026 at the Wayback Machine
- Status: Proposed
- Cost estimate: £2 billion (estimated 2022 prices)
- Opponents: Greenpeace; Lincolnshire Wildlife Trust; RSPB

Centre Port was a proposal made in Nov 2022 to develop a tidal barrage across The Wash in Eastern England, which would link Norfolk and Lincolnshire by road. The plan was to link Hunstanton in Norfolk, with Gibraltar Point in Lincolnshire, creating an 11-mile (18 km) road, with a port and a railway at the midway point. Additional goals of the development were to reduce the risk of sea flooding and to generate enough electricity to power 600,000 homes from tidal power. The scheme came under widespread criticism from those living in the area and from wildlife groups. As of September 2025, the promoter intended to submit a development consent order application in October 2025.

== History ==
The Wash is a large tidal area between the counties of Lincolnshire and Norfolk on the eastern coast of England. The Wash is fed by several major watercourses, the main ones are: (anticlockwise from the north) the Steeping River, River Witham, River Welland, River Nene and the River Great Ouse, and covers an area of 237 square miles (615 km^{2}). The Nene, Ouse, Walland and Witham, collectively discharge an average flow of 1,080 cubic feet per second (30.6 m^{3}/s) (93,366,000 cubic feet (2,643,840 m^{3}) per day.) fresh water into The Wash. (Note: This data is from 2011/2012. At the time, the Steeping River did not have a measuring station at its outfall.) The sea area of The Wash is significantly smaller than it was in the 16th century, as much of the land has been reclaimed - places such as Wisbech, now far inland, were subjected to flooding such as in 1236 when hundreds died in a massive sea-storm. A large swathe of land bordered by Boston in the north, Peterborough in the west, Wisbech and Ely in the south, and King's Lynn in the east which fringes the coastline of The Wash is still below sea level. The Wash is an estuary (or embayment) which has deep channels, intertidal sandbanks and mudflats, while the coastline fringing the two counties of Lincolnshire and Norfolk has extensive saltmarshes.

The proposal to build a barrage across the wash was first mooted in the 1960s, however, the plan then was that it would involve reclaiming some 10,000 acres (4,000 ha) of land and the diversion of fresh water spilling into the wash to feed water requirements in the south-east of England, particularly for agricultural needs. This would require a sea wall some 100-foot (30 m) in depth, releasing 500,000,000 imperial gallons (2.3×10^{9} L; 600,000,000 US gal) of fresh water per day. The scheme was costed between £150 million and £287 million, saving an annual bill of £300,000 on sea wall repairs in The Wash area. The project was dropped when the approval for a large on-land reservoir (Rutland Water) passed in Parliament. (Note: The bill was passed in Parliament by 10 votes (65 against, 75 for.) The Wash project was said to not have been able to deliver what was required in the timescale laid down by the water bill.)

Plans were also announced in the 1970s with a barrage much further south in The Wash, but the consultant engineers stated that the project was beyond their technology, something with which a team of Dutch engineers agreed. However, the Wash Water Storage Scheme was developed to determine the project's feasibility, in terms of its geological, and ecological impacts. Further schemes were mooted in 2008, and again in 2019 when the Environment Agency suggested such a plan to protect flooding damage to King's Lynn.

In 2023, The Wash, and other associated wetlands in Britain which are part of the East Atlantic Flyway, were nominated for UNESCO World Heritage status. The Wash estuary has several recognised protections, notably EMS (European Marine Site), NNR, RAMSAR, SAC, SSSI, and SPA.

== The 2022 proposal ==
Centre Port plan over The Wash. Plan not to scale; final project may differ to this schematic

Developer Port Evo announced plans in November 2022 to develop a tidal barrage across The Wash. This would include a causeway with an 11-mile (18 km) road along the entire length of the barrage, and also include:

- a container port known as Centre Port, capable of handling ships carrying 23,000 twenty-foot equivalent units
- a railway linking onto the Poacher Line in Lincolnshire
- a tidal energy scheme to generate electricity for 600,000 homes
- sea flood prevention of The Wash area

The port would provide a deep-water trans-shipment point for container traffic by rail. This would feed into the line between Skegness and Nottingham, providing a quicker route into the Midlands and Northern England than the current route from the East Anglian ports. The road would be a dual-carriageway from the container port area to Wainfleet, and a single-carriage road from the port to Hunstanton in the south in what would be a 20-minute journey end-to-end. The project has an initial estimate of 2028 for completion.

=== Support ===
The energy firm Centrica announced their support and funding towards a feasibility study. The managing director of the firm said "We’re excited to help Centre Port explore their ambitious plans for The Wash. The project represents one of the largest tidal power schemes anywhere in the world and would provide a reliable source of green energy to the UK."

=== Objections ===
In November 2022, the National Trust stated "The Wash is one of the most important estuaries in the UK. Therefore, news of a potential new container terminal and tidal scheme in an area designated for its importance to wildlife, is deeply concerning." They also said: "Some bold claims are being made about ecology and we are keen to seek further information on the detailed plans and data to back these up. We are ready to scrutinise these plans and hold developers to account on their promises."

Greenpeace were similarly critical of the effect on wildlife. Their chief scientist was quoted as saying: "Greenpeace remains highly sceptical that a tidal barrage on the Wash is a useful project, and it should certainly not be a priority for government support. Given the environmental impacts, needs for port infrastructure or flood defence should be met in a more targeted way."

The RSPB is strongly opposed to proposal and labelled it "outlandish, [and] unworkable."

Both the Lincolnshire Wildlife Trust, and the Wild Ken Hill nature reserve in Norfolk object to the scheme. The latter pointed out that "...The way the Wash works is it’s quite a dynamic wilderness, so you get very complex movements of water and sediment which creates a mosaic of mudflats, salt marsh, channels, tidal streams … and that is what makes it so great for wildlife. Over 2 million birds visit a year, it hosts 50% of Europe’s common seals, and it has eels which are critically endangered globally. To interfere with those processes is highly likely to be very damaging."

== See also ==
- Cardiff Bay Barrage
- Mersey Barrage
- Outer Trial Bank - a trial for fresh water storage in The Wash in the 1970s
- Severn Barrage
