= Adam baronets =

Set index for Adam baronets

There have been two baronetcies created for persons with the surname Adam, both in the Baronetage of the United Kingdom. As of 2026 one creation is extant.

- Adam baronets of Blair Adam (1882)
- Adam baronets of Hankelow Court (1917)

== See also ==
- Adams baronets
