= Adam baronets of Blair Adam (1882) =

Escutcheon of Adam of Blair Adam

The Adam baronetcy, of Blair Adam in the County of Kinross, was created in the Baronetage of the United Kingdom on 20 May 1882 for Charles Adam, who was later Lord Lieutenant of Kinross-shire from 1909 to 1911. The title was in honour of his late father, the Liberal politician and colonial administrator William Patrick Adam, who had been intended to receive it. The latter was the son of Admiral Sir Charles Adam, son of William Adam, only surviving son of the architect John Adam, brother of architects Robert Adam and James Adam.

The 1st Baronet died childless in 1922, when the baronetcy became extinct.

== Adam baronets, of Blair Adam (1882) ==
- Sir Charles Elphinstone Adam, 1st Baronet (1859–1922)

== Extended family ==
- John Adam and Sir Frederick Adam were great-uncles of the 1st Baronet.
- The 1st Baronet's estates passed to his nephew the naval officer Charles Keith Adam, who served as Lord Lieutenant of Kinross-shire 1955 to 1956.

== Notes ==
Baronetage of the United Kingdom
Preceded by Lawes baronets	Adam baronets of Blair Adam; 20 May 1882	Succeeded by Marling baronets
