= Eric Forbes Adam =

British diplomat (1888–1925)

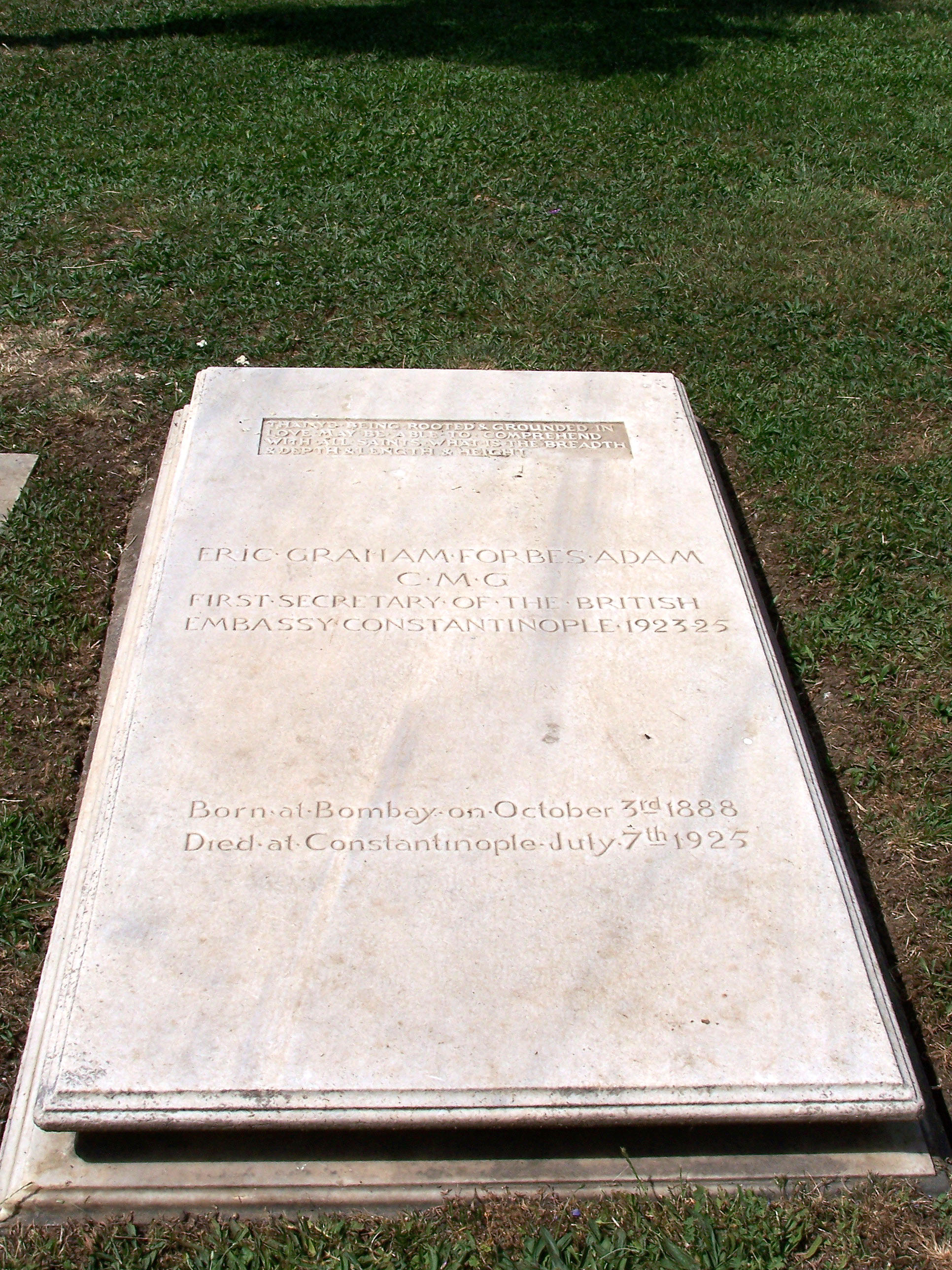
- Eric Forbes Adam's grave in Istanbul

Personal information
- Full name: Eric Graham Forbes Adam
- Born: 12 October 1888; Bombay, British India
- Died: 7 July 1925 (aged 36); Constantinople, Turkey
- Role: Batsman

Domestic team information
- Years: Team
- 1911: Cambridge University
- Only FC: 11 June 1911 Camb. Uni. v Yorks

Career statistics
Competition	First-class
Matches	1
Runs scored	27
Batting average	13.50
100s/50s	0/0
Top score	17
Catches/stumpings	1/0
- Source: CricketArchive, 28 May 2022

Eric Graham Forbes Adam CMG (3 October 1888 – 7 July 1925) was a British diplomat and First Secretary to the Foreign Office.

Adam was born in Malabar Hill, Bombay, India, the second son of Sir Frank Forbes Adam, 1st Baronet. His older brother was General Sir Ronald Forbes Adam, 2nd Baronet. He was educated at Eton and King's College, Cambridge.

While at Cambridge, Adam played one first-class cricket match for Cambridge University against Yorkshire on 1–3 June 1911 at Fenner's. He batted at number 6 in Cambridge's first innings, scoring 10 before being caught by Arthur Dolphin off the bowling of Wilfred Rhodes. During Yorkshire's first innings he gained some measure of revenge on Rhodes by catching him for 1 off the bowling of John Frederick Ireland – the only catch of his first-class career. In Cambridge's second innings he opened the batting with David Collins, scoring 17 before being bowled by Alonzo Drake. Cambridge won the match by 69 runs.

Adam married Agatha Perrin, daughter of R.W. Macan in 1918; their son was Sir Christopher Adam, 3rd Baronet (1920–2009).

Adam served as 3rd Secretary in the British Peace Delegation to the Paris Peace Conference of 1919; the London Conference of 1920 and the San Remo Conference. He was First Secretary in the British Delegation to the Lausanne Conference of 1922–1923.

Adam was made a Companion of the Order of St Michael and St George in 1923.

Adam died in Istanbul in 1925, aged 36, and is buried in Haydarpaşa Cemetery in Istanbul.
